= COVID-19 pandemic in Kerala =

Ongoing COVID-19 viral pandemic in Kerala

COVID-19 pandemic in Kerala, India
- Disease: COVID-19
- Pathogen: SARS-CoV-2
- Location: Kerala, India
- Arrival date: 30 January 2020 (6 years, 9 months, 3 weeks and 2 days)
- Confirmed cases: ▲65,34,352
- Active cases: ▼2,507
- Recovered: ▲64,62,811
- Deaths: ▲68,197 (Note: One confirmed case of a Mahe native who died in the district of Kannur is not included.)
- Fatality rate: 1.03%
- Territories: All 14 districts
- Vaccinations: >99% of adults (one dose); 90.5% (two doses); 79.8% of 15-18 year olds (one dose)

Government website
- dashboard.kerala.gov.in/covid/

The first case of the COVID-19 pandemic in Kerala (which was also the first reported case in all of India) was confirmed in Thrissur on 30 January 2020. As of 5 April 2022, there have been 65,34,352 confirmed cases, test positivity rate is at 2.04% (13.96% cumulative), with 64,62,811 (98.91%) recoveries and 68,197 (1.04%) deaths in the state.

Initially, Kerala's success in containing COVID-19 was widely praised both nationally and internationally, Following high number of cases being reported in March, Kerala had, by April 30, reduced the rate of increase of new cases to less than 0.25% per day. However, in mid-May, there was an increase or "second wave" of new cases, following the return of Keralites from other countries and other Indian states. In July, a large local group of cases was identified at the Kumarichantha fish market in Thiruvananthapuram. There was a third surge in cases post-Onam, with a high number of new cases reported in late-October in Malappuram, Kozhikode, Ernakulam and Thrissur districts. Active cases peaked at 97,525, and started to decline from November, before bouncing back to over 4,00,000 in May 2021 following the state elections. On 12 May 2021 Kerala reported the largest single day spike with 43,529 new cases. During 27–28 July Kerala reported 22,129 and 22,056 new cases respectively, accounting for more than 50% of daily new cases in India in those days. The state, however, has the low case fatality rate in India - 1.05% - compared to the national average of 1.2%.

As per the official reports from the Government of Kerala, up until September 9, 2022, there were 9,110 active COVID-19 cases, with a cumulative total of 6,767,856 confirmed cases, 6,686,948 recoveries, and 70,913 confirmed deaths. Since then, official updates have been less frequent on the government portal, with data often appearing in newspaper reports. By 2024, case numbers have fluctuated significantly, reflecting a substantial decrease in the rate of transmission within the state. However, sporadic positive cases continue to be reported, indicating that the virus has not been fully eradicated.

== Timeline of events ==
Major events in COVID-19 pandemic in Kerala
30 January	First confirmed case
20 February	All positive individuals recovered
9 March	Reported second wave of cases
10 March	Shutdown of educational institutions
12 March	Government COVID-19 Mobile App "GoK Direct" Released, developed by Startup Qkopy
22 March	Janta Curfew – Nationwide one day voluntary curfew
23 March	Announced statewide lockdown till March 31
24 March	100 confirmed cases
25 March	Nationwide lockdown imposed
28 March	First death reported
10 April	100 reported recoveries
13 April	Reported recoveries surpassed active cases
5 May	500 confirmed cases
20 May	500 reported recoveries
27 May	1000 confirmed cases

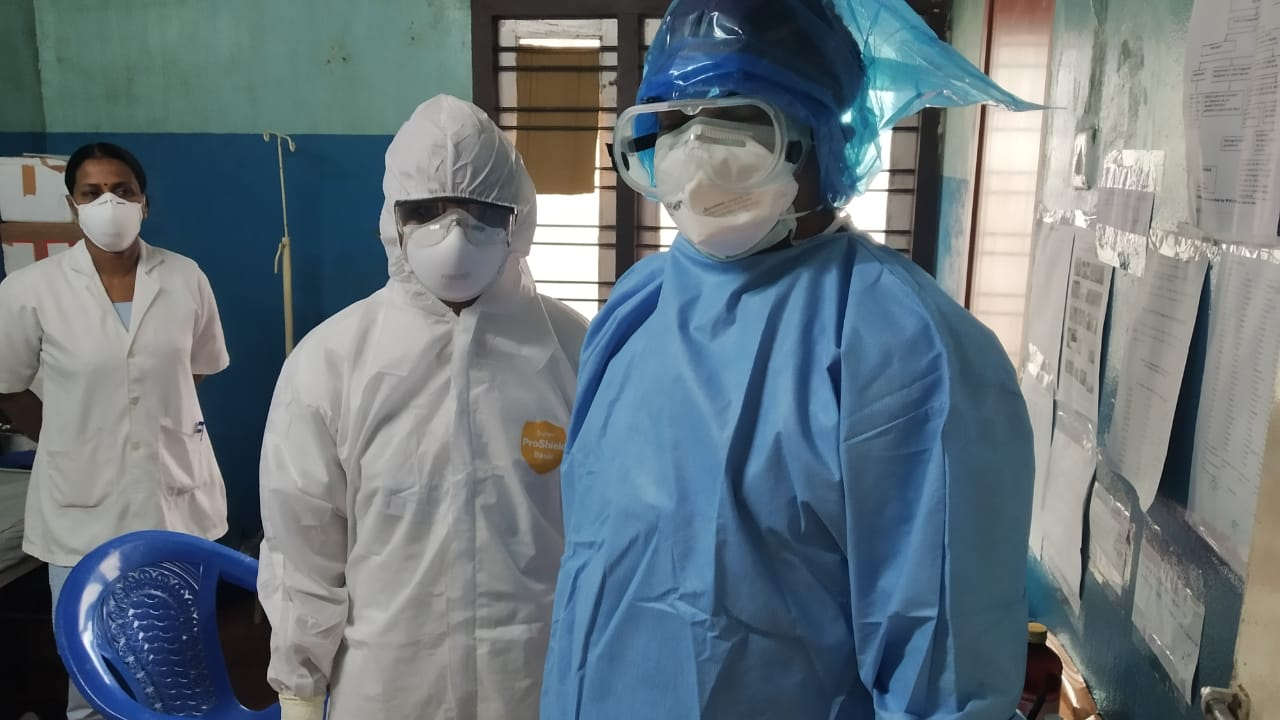
Healthcare workers wearing personal protective equipment for caregiving for a patient with coronavirus infection in a government hospital in Kerala.

COVID-19 Dashboard
Total samples tested	30,956,146
Total positive cases	39,46,307
Total active cases	1,95,279
Total deaths	20,313
Total recovered cases	37,30,198
People vaccinated 1st dose	1,95,47,235
People vaccinated 2nd dose	70,49,010
As of August 27, 2021

=== Initial cases ===
==== January 2020 ====
Starting 30 January 2020, the first positive cases of coronavirus in India were reported from three students of Kerala origin, travelling from the Wuhan province of China, which was the point of origin of the disease. They belonged to Thrissur, Alappuzha and Kasargod districts of Kerala and two of them were medical students at a university in Wuhan.

==== February ====
Following the detection of positive cases, the government of Kerala declared a 'state calamity warning' on 4 February. Over 3000 contacts of the affected individuals were placed under quarantine, out of which 45 were placed in hospital quarantine. The three positive individuals later recovered from the infection following hospital care. The 'state calamity' warning was withdrawn after 4 days, when no further cases were reported. As China was a popular country for students from Kerala to pursue medical studies, several medical students got stranded in China when the lock-down due to coronavirus was put into effect. Some of them, who were stranded in airports in China were evacuated and flown into Cochin International Airport and quarantined at isolation wards in Kochi Medical College. However, none of them later tested positive for the disease.

=== First wave ===
==== March ====
The government of Kerala declared high alert on 8 March 2020 due to coronavirus cases being reported from the state. Isolation wards with 40 beds were set up in 21 major hospitals of the state and a helpline was activated in every district. As of 9 March, more than 4000 persons are under home or hospital quarantine in Kerala. As of 4 March, 215 health care workers were deployed across Kerala and 3,646 Telephone counseling services were conducted to provide psycho-social support to families of those suspected to be infected. Despite the threat of coronavirus infection, the Kerala government decided to go ahead with Attukal pongala, a large, annual, all-women religious congregation in Thiruvananthapuram. The government also urged individuals to refrain themselves from the pongala, take precautions against disease transmission and, if possible, offer pongala at their own homes. The government of Kerala has started a YouTube channel for updating the public regarding the status of coronavirus spread in Kerala and precautions to be taken. There are three coronavirus testing centers in Kerala : National Institute of Virology Field Unit, Thiruvananthapuram Medical College, Calicut Medical College.

On 10 March, the Kerala government arranged special isolation wards in prisons across the state. On 10 March, the government of Kerala shut down all colleges and schools up to grade 7. The government also urged people to not undertake pilgrimages, attend large gatherings such as weddings and cinema shows.

The government also launched a mobile application called "GoK Direct" for users to get information and updates regarding COVID-19. It is an initiative from the Kerala Startup Mission and the Information & Public Relations Department, developed by the startup Qkopy. The app can also send text message alerts to basic phones (without internet). The app will focus on general announcements, information and updated guidelines for travellers, details about the quarantine protocol and also health and safety tips for visitors to the state.

On 15 March, the new initiative 'Break the Chain' was introduced by the Government of Kerala. (See next section for more details.)

On 19 March, Chief minister Pinarayi Vijayan announced a stimulus package of Rs 20,000 crore (€2.5 billion; $2.6 billion) to help the state overcome both the COVID-19 epidemic and economic hardship caused by it. This includes Rs. 500 crore for healthcare, Rs 2,000 crore for loans and free rations, Rs 2,000 crore for creating jobs in rural areas, Rs 1,000 crore for families with financial difficulties, and Rs 1,320 crore for paying two months pensions in advance. The government has also ordered salons and workout centers to shut down. This is in order to prevent the virus from spreading via direct contact.

On 22 March, Health minister of Kerala, K. K. Shailaja strongly warned people to follow the orders from Health department of Kerala. A citizen science initiative, Collective for Open Data Distribution - Keralam (CODD-K), by a group of technologists, academicians, and students advocating open data released first bilingual (Malayalam and English) online dashboard (March 22, 2020) for non-specialists to provide real-time analysis, and daily updates of COVID-19 cases in Kerala by leveraging publicly available data from the daily bulletins published by the department of health services (DHS), Government of Kerala, and various news outlets

On 23 March, Chief minister Pinarayi Vijayan announced a statewide lock-down until 31 March to prevent further spread of the coronavirus. This was before the central government declared a nationwide lock-down. Most strictly applied in Kasargod, necessary shops like grocery stores were allowed to open from 11am to 5pm. In the other districts, necessary shops were opened from 7 am until 5 pm with the exception of medical stores. Public transports were shut down. There was no restriction for private vehicles but district to district travels was only allowed with thorough checking.

In late March, two researchers from the University of Cambridge came up with a new mathematical model that predicts a flat 49-day countrywide lockdown or sustained lockdown with periodic relaxation extending over two months may be necessary to prevent COVID-19 resurgence in India.

==== "Break the Chain" ====
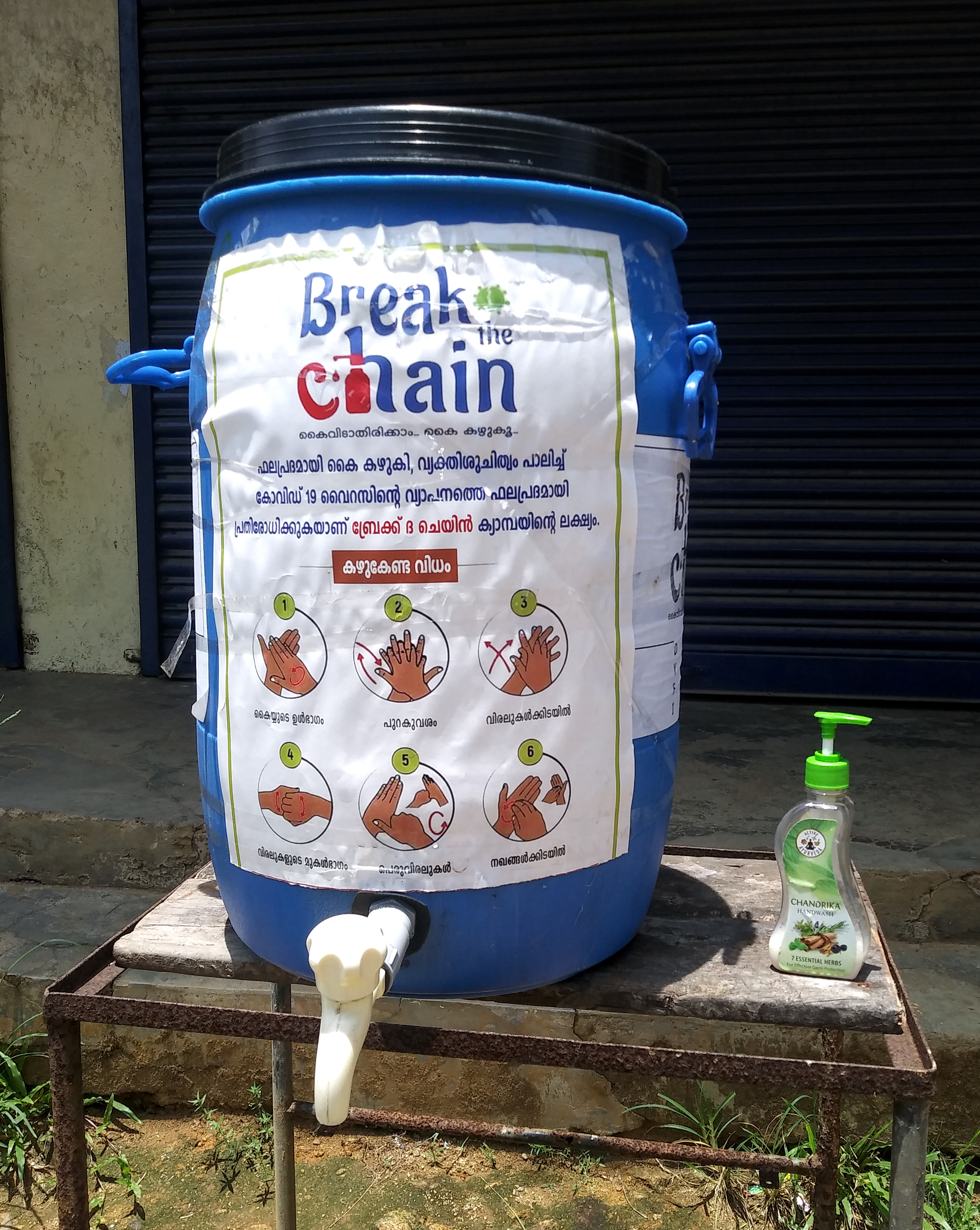
Hand washing facilities provided as part of Break the chain campaign

The Kerala government introduced a mass hand washing campaign named break the chain on March 15 to educate people about the importance of public and personal hygiene due to the spread of the novel coronavirus across the state. Health Minister of Kerala, Smt. K. K. Shailaja inaugurated the mass campaign. The government has appealed the public to promote break the chain campaign as a safety measure. During this campaign, the government has installed water taps with hand wash bottles at public spots of the railway stations and other public places.

==== April - District Classification ====
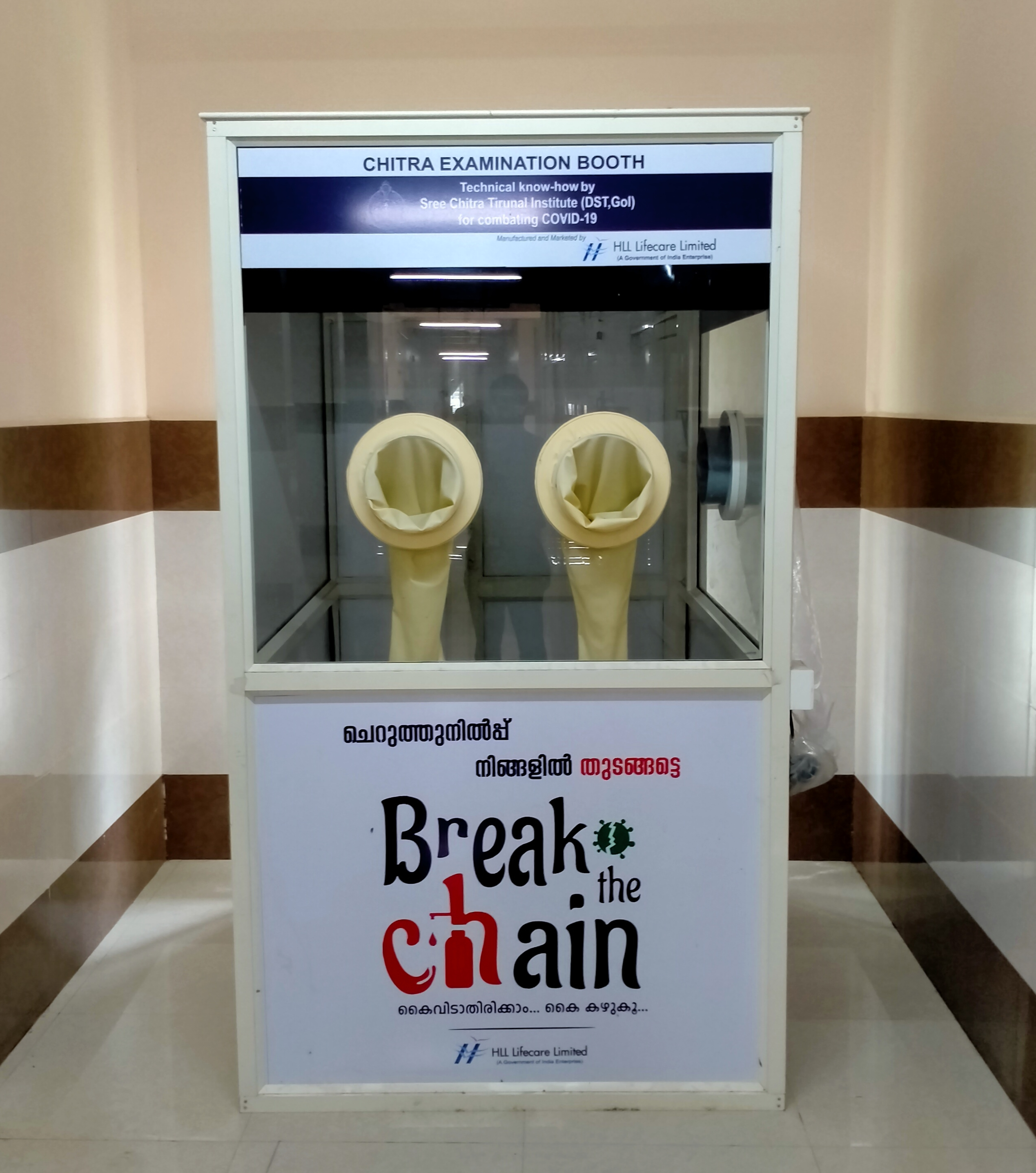
A COVID-19 testing kiosk in Kerala

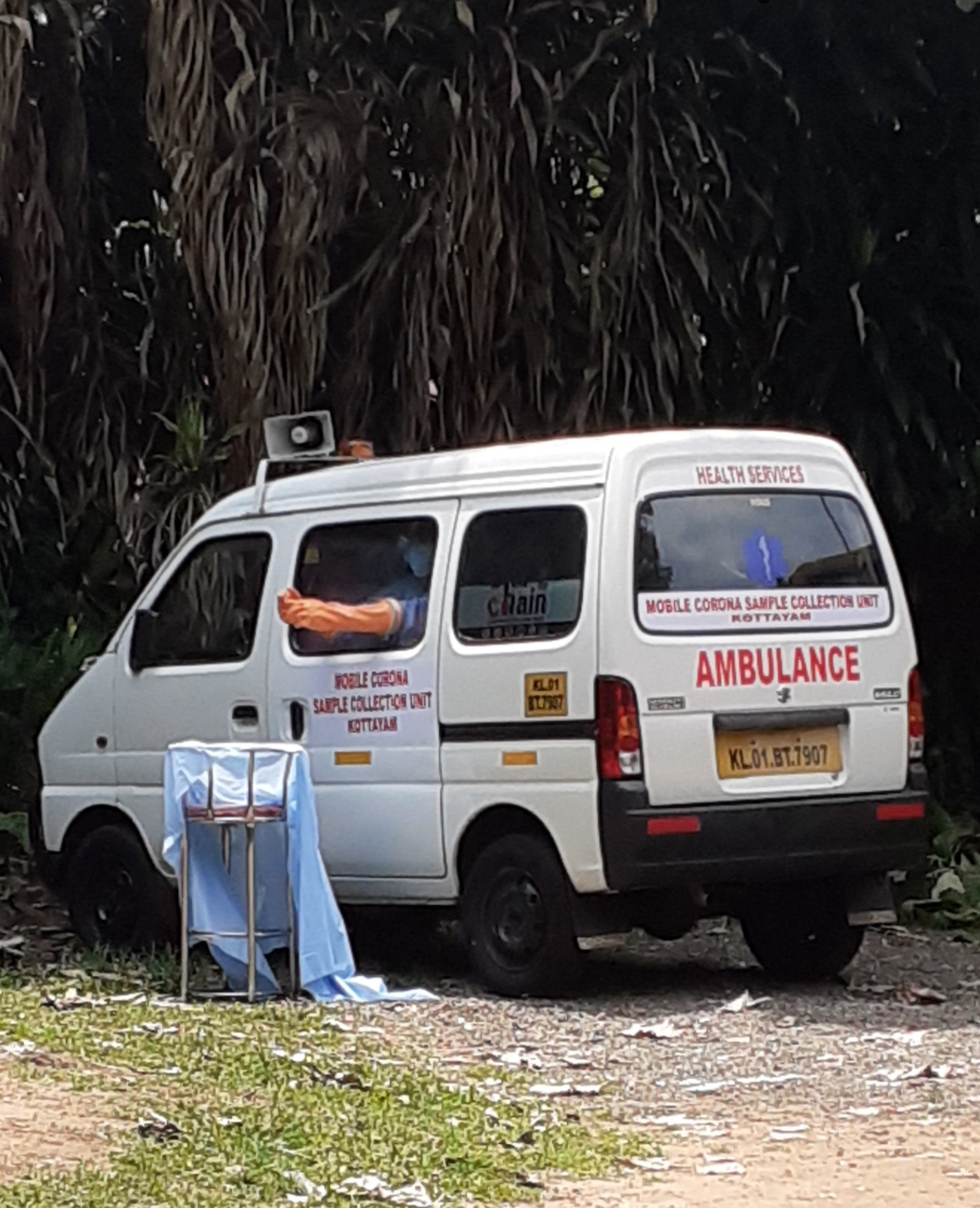
Mobile sample collection units for COVID-19 in Kerala

By 16 April, the Union Health Ministry had identified seven districts in Kerala as COVID-19 hotspots.

Finally, Kerala designated four districts – Kasargod, Kannur, Kozhikode and Malappuram – as 'Red Zone', Idukki and Kottayam as 'Green Zone' and the remaining eight districts as 'Orange Zone'. Lock-down restrictions in the Green and Orange Zones were relaxed on 20 and 24 April. Inter-state and inter-district travel would continue to be banned. People travelling outside their homes would be required to wear a mask. Every district would be given a special plan for preventive measures. According to the government's order, 13 services, including air, rail and inter-district bus services, will not be available in the zoning system throughout the lockdown.

On 23 April 2020, Pinarayi Vijayan announced that the two 'Green Zone' districts – Idukki and Kottayam – would be added to the COVID-19 Orange Zone. This followed confirmation of new positive cases in these districts. On 27 April 2020, Kottayam and Idukki districts were included in the 'Red Zone' due to rising numbers of new cases. With this, six districts are in the Red zone. State Police Chief, Lokanath Behera announced that two IPS officers have been appointed as Special Officers in the Red Zone, Idukki and Kottayam.

==== May ====
On 2 May 2020, Wayanad district was shifted to Orange Zone following the report of the COVID-19 case. Thrissur, Alappuzha and Ernakulam have been in the green zone with no new cases reported for more than 21 days. Kannur and Kottayam will remain in the red zone. Other districts are in the orange zone. The zonal classification will be changed from time to time to assess the situation in the districts. Lock-down control in hotspots in Red Zone districts has been decided to be implemented more strictly. No public transportation will be allowed, including in the Green Zone.

=== Repatriating Keralites ===
Data of 351,636 NORKA registered expatriates based on their included type:
1. Other reasons (35.8%)
2. Annual leave (20.1%)
3. Lost job (17.4%)
4. Visiting visa (11.7%)
5. Expired visiting visa (7.70%)
6. Elderly (3.20%)
7. Children (3.02%)
8. Graduated students (0.82%)
9. Prisoners (0.22%)

Details of passengers (excluding other state passengers updated up to 5 October 2020)
Travel	Total passengers	Home quarantine	Institutional quarantine	Passengers in isolation
International Airport	5,91,902	4,60,129	35,256	3,396
Seaport	1,884	514	1,101	6
Check post	3,75,584	3,67,102	8,329	153
Railway	1,00,656	97,988	1,912	156
Total	10,70,026			

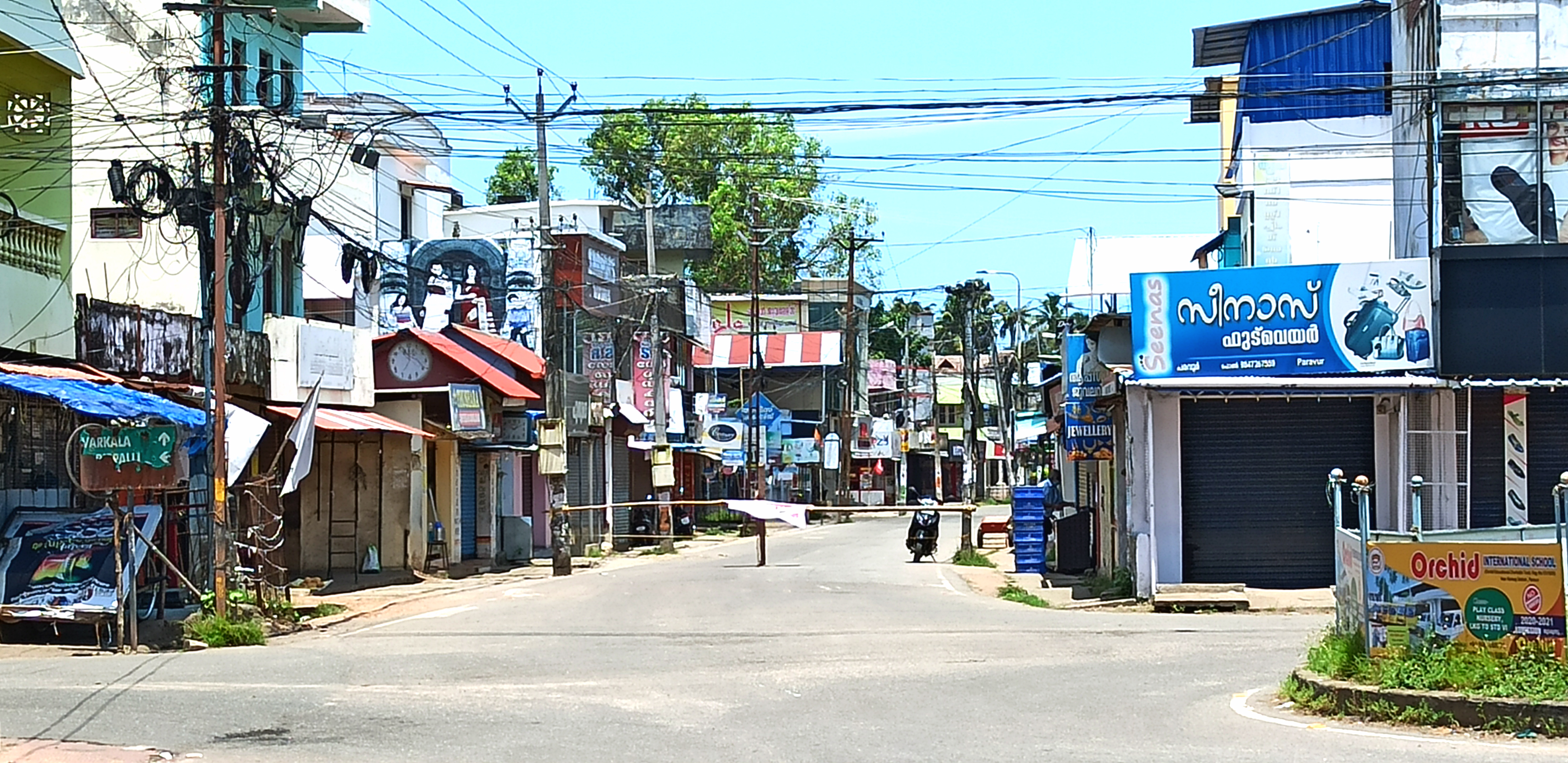
Closed Paravur-Varkala road in Kollam district due to COVID-19 spread

Following the lockdown, steps were taken to help Keralites stranded in other countries - particularly the Persian Gulf nations - return to India. At least 4.27 lakh NRKs (non-resident Keralites) had registered on the NORKA (Department of Non Resident Keralites Affairs) portal, of which about 1.69 lakh people constituted the most vulnerable sections, those who had lost their jobs or whose employment contract had not been renewed; those released from prisons and awaiting deportation, pregnant women, elderly people, students who had completed courses and whose visa had expired etc. However, it is unclear whether all these people would be allowed to travel home, considering certain conditions and priorities set by the local embassies and the centre.

For weeks, the state health department had been engaged in setting up facilities and protocols to be pushed into action when the expatriates come home. Health minister KK Shailaja said in a statement that her department was fully equipped to deal with expatriates at all four international airports – Trivandrum International Airport, Cochin International Airport, Calicut International Airport and Kannur International Airport.

==== Pre-arrival protocols ====
Initially, there would be a basic medical screening for those wishing to return home. Only those found asymptomatic were allowed to board the aircraft. Passengers inside flights were seated in a zig-zag fashion, wearing masks. 45 minutes before arrival, announcements were made inside the flight about quarantine. Those running a fever were sent to the isolation bay. Others were directed to the help desks. Each of the help desks had a doctor, staff nurse, volunteer and a data entry operator. Passengers were checked for symptoms by the doctor. Those with other symptoms were also directed to the isolation bay.

The Indian Consulate had appealed to passengers not to overcrowd the airport, maintain social distancing and follow all necessary precautions stipulated by the authorities. Air India crew members on board the repatriation flights were issued protective gear, including Personal Protective Equipment, to reduce the risk of contracting coronavirus.

==== Post-arrival protocols ====
Separate mobile health applications had been created to register and track the expatriates who arrive at three of the airports in the first phase – Kochi, Thiruvananthapuram and Kozhikode. The app to be used at Thiruvananthapuram is named 'Karuthal' (English: Precaution), the one designed for Kochi is 'Ayurraksha' (English: Life protection) and the one for Kozhikode is 'Agamanam' (English: Arrival). All the details of those who have registered on the NORKA website have been plugged into the app. Using QR codes, each of the travellers can be contacted and traced.

The passengers were home quarantined for 14 days and monitored by ward-level Vigil Committees in their residences. Those who wanted to stay in corona care homes were shifted to such centres near airports. The expatriates also had to stay in government-arranged facilities for the first seven days. On the seventh day, PCR test for coronavirus would be conducted and those who tested negative sent home. Those who test positive would be sent to hospitals. Those who were sent home would have to remain in quarantine for one more week. Antibody tests would also be widely done on overseas returnees.

==== Operation Samudra Setu ====
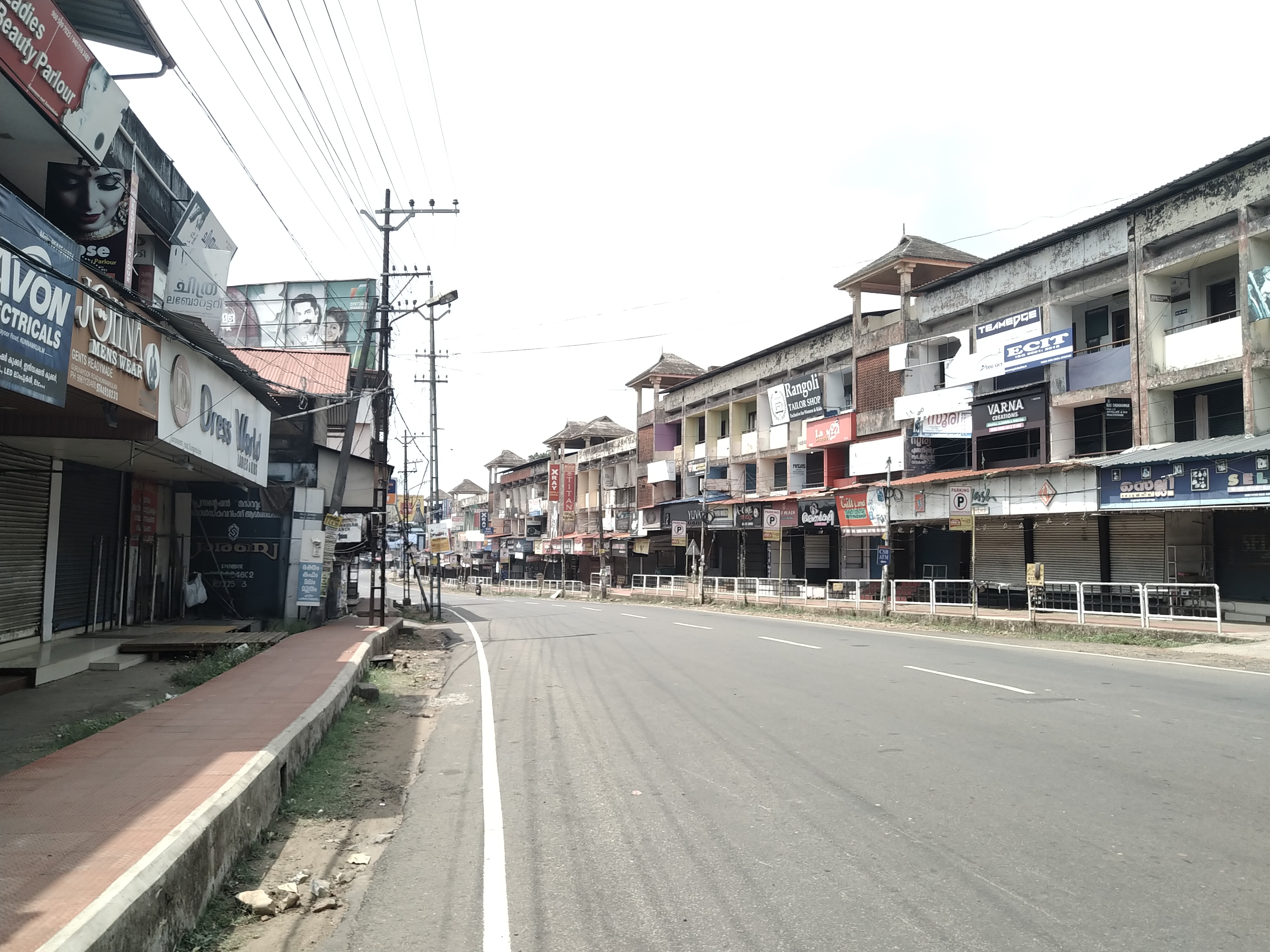
Empty Kunnamkulam town on a full lockdown Sunday

The navy named its evacuation operation as "Samudra Setu" (Sea Bridge). The repatriation exercise was conducted in keeping with a standard operating procedure (SOP) prepared by the central government. Under the first phase of Operation "Samudra Setu", INS Jalashwa brought back 750 Indians from the Maldives, followed by another 250 repatriations by INS Magar. The ships sailed to the Cochin Port port and the evacuated personnel were disembarked there.

Sources in the military said there are nearly 3,500 Indians stranded in the Maldives, a tourist destination that lies to India's south-west in the Indian Ocean. A call is yet to be taken on the repatriation of the remaining 2,500 Indians, the sources added. Meanwhile, the sources said, two other Naval ships are waiting off West Asia, which hosts the largest share of Indian citizens abroad. Since the area is also being served by the Air India repatriation flights, the sources added, the Ministry of External Affairs (MEA) has not decided which country they will need to enter to undertake the exercise.

Arrangements were made at the port to receive the ship, part of the Indian Navy's 'Operation Samudra Setu' to evacuate the stranded Indians overseas amid the COVID-19 pandemic. The movement of passengers from the ship to the terminal was held under the supervision of district administration and health department. The e-declaration of the passengers would be completed on board the ship itself. Preliminary tests would also be conducted. Those with symptoms would be allowed to disembark first and move to a separate zone earmarked on the terminal. And after completing the immigration and customs checks, they would be taken to the hospital in ambulances. The District Medical Office (DMO) would oversee this. Other passengers would be categorized into batches of 50 based on their districts and allowed to disembark next. Their immigration and customs checks will be completed at the Samudrika cruise terminal. The port health organisation will check the e-declaration of the passengers. BSNL will issue new SIM cards to passengers. Passengers will have to install Aarogya Setu app at the terminal itself. After completing the checks, passengers would be sent to various districts in buses with 30 people each. Cars will be provided depending on the need. Visitors, relatives or friends of passengers would not be allowed at the Samudrika terminal.

=== Second wave ===
The return of expatriates caused a surge in cases from May to August. During this phase, there was very little community spread as most cases were in people already in quarantine. In July, a large local group of cases was identified at the Kumarichantha fish market in Thiruvananthapuram. While the first wave had mainly affected northern Kerala, this wave was most severe in Thiruvananthapuram district.

=== Third wave ===
Lock-down restrictions were significantly relaxed for the state festival of Onam in late August. This led to a rapid spike in cases all across the state. The number of cases increased from 21,268 on 4 September to 96,310 on 11 October, before falling gradually. Following this, restrictions were not relaxed for most other festivals.

=== Fourth wave ===
Kerala held elections to all local bodies (municipalities and panchayaths) in December. This led to a minor increase in cases in December 2020 and January 2021. Active cases increased from 58,000 in mid-December to 70,000 in late-January. This period also coincides with winter in Kerala, and this may also have contributed to the rise. Following this, cases declined steadily to about 25,000 in mid-March 2021, and then stood steady in the low 20,000s.

=== Fifth Wave ===
Following local elections, elections to the State Legislature were conducted on 6 April 2021. This was controversial, as the local elections had been followed by a rise in cases. Despite strict rules on campaigning, this election was also followed by a spike. Active cases increased from 31,493 on 7 April to 4,38,913 on 14 May. This was the largest spike in active cases to date. The Thrissur Pooram festival was closed to the public due to the spike in covid cases. April also saw a massive spike in covid cases throughout India, along with shortages in vaccines, oxygen cylinders and other medicines. Kerala suffered severe shortages in vaccines, but oxygen supply was sufficient and cylinders were even sent to neighbouring states. Oxygen 'War Rooms' were announced in each district. On 6 May 2021 Kerala announced a lockdown for the second time from 8 May 2021 to 16 May 2021 to contain the massive spread of the disease. The lockdown was later extended until 30 May 2021, then to 9 June with some relaxations and then to 16 June.

After 16 June, the state-wide lock-down was replaced with four tiers based on test positivity rate. Panchayaths and municipal wards with a TPR exceeding 30% would be placed under a triple lock-down, while the prevailing rules would continue in areas with a TPR between 20% and 30%. Local bodies with a TPR between 8% and 20% would have significant relaxations, while those with a TPR below 8% would enjoy near-normal life. In all areas, agricultural and industrial activities would be allowed, and weekend lock-downs would continue. Essential shops could operate from 7:00 to 19:00 hours. Other relaxations were announced for public transport, offices, examinations and hotels. Kerala government relaxed the lockdown regulations from July 18 to 20 due to Bakrid celebration on July 21. Shops other than those selling the essential goods like textile shops, footwear shops, electronics shops and fancy shops were allowed to function up to 8 pm on these days. This was applicable to A, B and C category local self-government bodies based on test positivity rate. Maximum of 40 people with at least one dosage of immunisation was allowed in worship locations. Stores in areas under triple lockdown was permitted to reopen on Monday.

On 4 August, the TPR-based tier system of local self-government bodies was replaced with a ward-level case density based system, under which triple lockdown would be applied in wards with more than ten cases per one thousand people. Shops were allowed to open from 7 am to 9 pm, and the lock-down was limited to Sundays. However, customers at shops were required to have either a recent covid negative RT-PCR test result, at least one dose of vaccination, or successful recovery from COVID-19. Enforcement of this rule was left to the shop owners, many of whom pointed out that it was difficult to follow. In the state Assembly, the opposition said that this decision was impractical as vaccines were in short supply and only 42% of the population had received at least one dose. Initially, Veena George, the Minister of Health, refused to change the requirements. However, on 10 August, following further complaints, the requirement was waived for families in which no member could satisfy the requirements. Following the Kerala High Court's criticism of the decision to exclude Bevco outlets from these requirements, similar rules were applied there. Finally, the local lock-down was extended to all wards with more than eight cases per one thousand people.

Following decline in the test positivity rate and 75% of adults getting at least one dose of the vaccination, the Sunday lock-down and night-time restrictions were withdrawn on 7 September.

By late November, adult vaccination had crossed 95%. However, it was found that many government employees, including 2,500 - 5000 school teachers, had refused vaccinations. Considering the safety of students and the general public, unvaccinated school staff were asked to produce either a medical exemption certificate or weekly negative RT-PCR test results taken at their own expense. It was also decided that those who refused vaccinations for non-medical reasons would not be treated at state expense if they contracted COVID-19.

=== Omicron Variant ===
In early January 2022, there was a fresh rise in cases due to the fast-spreading Omicron variant. A partial night lockdown was implemented to control its spread.

Following a fall in the number of active cases, the government stopped publishing daily reports on 11 April. However, cases would continue to be recorded and monitored by the Health Department.

== Current situation ==
=== Quarantine ===
Kerala mandates 14-day home quarantine for returnees from abroad and other states and also those who have come in contact with patients.

=== Testing ===
Samples are taken from symptomatic persons (known as Routine Samples). Tests done in private labs also come under the Routine Sample heading. Apart from this, samples are also taken from priority groups like health care workers, persons with high social exposure, workers etc., known as Sentinel Surveillance Counts. The total samples tested will be the sum of all including repeated samples taken from the same person.

==== Mass Testing ====
Following the uncontrollable surge in the number of daily cases and higher test positivity rate, on 15 April 2021 the government announced that a total of 250 000 tests would be conducted in the following 2 days to identify more positive cases and contain them.

Due to the steep increase in the daily cases on 21 April 2021, the government announced mass testing for the second time and a total of 3 lakh tests would be conducted on the following 2 days. i.e. on 22nd and 23 April 2021. The decision on conducting mass testing for the second time follows criticism and opposition from Kerala Govt Medical Officers Association (KGMOA) and IMA that the mass testing would be unscientific and the delay in results will lead to a crisis. KGMOA Proposed that testing should be shortened to those people with symptoms and to those coming in the contact list also the Lab facilities should be increased. The mass vaccination campaign should also be limited because this may cause increase in spread, the IMA noted

=== Vaccination ===
4,59,893 people registered for the first phase, targeting healthcare workers and police staff. Kerala mainly used the Covishield vaccine, developed by Oxford University and manufactured in India by the Serum Institute of India in Pune. Senior citizens were vaccinated starting in March, and the vaccine was made available to all those over the age of 45 in April. The Kerala Government has announced that all people in the state will be provided vaccines free of charge. Vaccination for adults younger than 45, who had certain medical conditions, began in May.

View chart definition.

=== Genomic surveillance ===
Kerala has been one of the initial states which put together a comprehensive programme for genomic surveillance of SARS-CoV-2. This programme was a partnership between the Department of Health and the Council of Scientific and Industrial Research involving 12 Medical Colleges, State Public health laboratory as well as units in Mahatma Gandhi University, Kerala and the Central University of Kerala. The pilot study suggested the major clusters in Kerala came from inter-state introductions rather than international introductions. The sequencing is performed at the Institute of Genomics and Integrative Biology which also maintains a comprehensive resource of the genomes. The data is also incorporated in the national surveillance dashboard. The programme has been instrumental in providing inputs on the spread and emergence of SARS-CoV-2 variants in the state including ones with immune escape property. The systematic surveillance also resulted in one of the earliest reports on the genomics of COVID-19 vaccine breakthrough infections

== Statistics ==
=== Type of transmission ===
- T – Overseas travel-related
- PTP – Person-to-person or contact transmission

List of confirmed patients in Kerala
Date (2020)	District(s)	Origin	Cases		Type of transmission	Source(s)
Date (2020)	District(s)	Origin	New	Total	Type of transmission	Source(s)
Jan-30	Thrissur	Wuhan	1	1	T	
Feb-2	Alappuzha	Wuhan	1	2	T	
Feb-3	Kasargod	Wuhan	1	3	T	
Mar-9	Pathanamthitta	Italy	3	8	T	
Mar-9	Pathanamthitta	Italy	2	8	PTP	
Mar-9	Ernakulam	Italy	1	9	T	
Mar-10	Pathanamthitta (4), Kottayam (2)	Italy	6	17	PTP	
Mar-10	Ernakulam	Italy	2	17	T	
Mar-12	Kannur, Thrissur	Qatar, UAE	2	19	T	
Mar-13	Thiruvananthapuram	Spain, UK	3	22	T	
Mar-15	Thiruvananthapuram, Idukki	None	2	24	PTP	
Mar-16	Kasargod (1), Malappuram (2)	Saudi Arabia, UAE	3	27	T	
Mar-19	Kasargod	None	1	28	PTP	
Mar-20	Ernakulam (6), Kasargod (6)	Middle East	12	40	PTP	
Mar-21	Ernakulam (3), Kannur (3), Kasargod (6)	Middle East	12	52	T	
Mar-22	Ernakulam (2), Malappuram (2), Kannur (4), Kasargod (5), Kozhikode (2)	Middle East	15	67	T	
Mar-23	Ernakulam (2), Kannur (5), Kasargod (19), Pathanamthitta (1), Thrissur (1)	UAE	25	95	T	
Mar-23	Ernakulam (2), Kannur (5), Kasargod (19), Pathanamthitta (1), Thrissur (1)	UAE	3	95	PTP	
Mar-24	Alappuzha (1), Ernakulam (1), Kasargod (6), Kottayam (1), Kozhikode (2), Malappuram (1), Palakkad (1), Thiruvananthapuram (1)	Qatar, UAE, UK	12	109	T	
Mar-24	Alappuzha (1), Ernakulam (1), Kasargod (6), Kottayam (1), Kozhikode (2), Malappuram (1), Palakkad (1), Thiruvananthapuram (1)	None	2	109	PTP	
Mar-25	Ernakulam (3), Idukki (1), Kozhikode (1), Palakkad (2), Pathanamthitta (2)	UAE, UK, France	6	118	T	
Mar-25	Ernakulam (3), Idukki (1), Kozhikode (1), Palakkad (2), Pathanamthitta (2)	None	3	118	PTP	
Mar-26	Idukki (1), Kasargod (3), Malappuram (3), Thrissur (2), Wayanad (1)	Middle East	10	137	PTP	
Mar-26	Kannur	UAE	9	137	T	
Mar-27	Kasargod (34), Kannur (2), Kollam (1), Kozhikode (1), Thrissur (1)	UAE	25	176	T	
Mar-27	Kasargod (34), Kannur (2), Kollam (1), Kozhikode (1), Thrissur (1)	None	14	176	PTP	
Mar-28	Kasargod (1), Kollam (1), Palakkad (1), Malappuram (1), Thiruvananthapuram (2)	None	6	182	PTP	
Mar-29	Ernakulam (1), Kannur (8), Kasargod (7), Malappuram (1), Palakkad (1), Thrissur (1), Thiruvananthapuram (1)	UAE	18	202	T	
Mar-29	Ernakulam (1), Kannur (8), Kasargod (7), Malappuram (1), Palakkad (1), Thrissur (1), Thiruvananthapuram (1)	None	2	202	PTP	
Mar-30	Idukki (2), Kannur (11), Kasargod (17), Wayanad (2),	Middle East	17	234	T	
Mar-30	Idukki (2), Kannur (11), Kasargod (17), Wayanad (2),	None	15	234	PTP	
Mar-31	Kannur (1), Kasargod (2), Kollam (1), Thiruvananthapuram (2), Thrissur (1)	None	7	241	PTP	
Apr-1	Kasargod (12), Ernakulam (3), Thiruvananthapuram (2), Thrissur (2), Malappuram (2), Kannur (2), Palakkad (1)	Middle East	9	265	T	
Apr-1	Kasargod (12), Ernakulam (3), Thiruvananthapuram (2), Thrissur (2), Malappuram (2), Kannur (2), Palakkad (1)	None	15	265	PTP	
Apr-2	Idukki (5), Kannur (1), Kasargod (8), Kollam (2), Kozhikode (1), Malappuram (1), Pathanamthitta (1), Thiruvananthapuram (1), Thrissur (1)	Qatar, UAE	12	286	T	
Apr-2	Idukki (5), Kannur (1), Kasargod (8), Kollam (2), Kozhikode (1), Malappuram (1), Pathanamthitta (1), Thiruvananthapuram (1), Thrissur (1)	None	9	286	PTP	
Apr-3	Kannur (1), Kasargod (7), Thrissur (1)	None	9	295	PTP	
Apr-4	Alappuzha (1), Ernakulam (1), Kannur (1), Kasargod (6), Kollam (1), Palakkad (1)	UAE	5	306	T	
Apr-4	Alappuzha (1), Ernakulam (1), Kannur (1), Kasargod (6), Kollam (1), Palakkad (1)	Delhi (3), Nagpur (1)	4	306	PTP	
Apr-4	Alappuzha (1), Ernakulam (1), Kannur (1), Kasargod (6), Kollam (1), Palakkad (1)	None	2	306	PTP	
Apr-5	Kozhikode (5), Pathanamthitta (1)	UAE	1	314	T	
Apr-5	Kozhikode (5), Pathanamthitta (1)	Delhi	4	314	PTP	
Apr-5	Kannur (1), Kasargod (1)	None	3	314	PTP	
Apr-6	Kasargod (6), Pathanamthitta (1)	Abroad	7	327	T	
Apr-6	Malappuram (2), Kollam (1)	Delhi	3	327	PTP	
Apr-6	Kasargod	None	3	327	PTP	
Apr-7	Kannur (3), Kasargod (4), Kollam (1), Malappuram (1)	Overseas	4	336	T	
Apr-7	Kannur (3), Kasargod (4), Kollam (1), Malappuram (1)	Delhi	2	336	PTP	
Apr-7	Kannur (3), Kasargod (4), Kollam (1), Malappuram (1)	None	3	336	PTP	
Apr-8	Kannur (4), Alappuzha (2), Pathanamthitta (1), Thrissur (1), Kasargod (1)	Overseas	4	345	T	
Apr-8	Kannur (4), Alappuzha (2), Pathanamthitta (1), Thrissur (1), Kasargod (1)	Delhi	2	345	PTP	
Apr-8	Kannur (4), Alappuzha (2), Pathanamthitta (1), Thrissur (1), Kasargod (1)	None	3	345	PTP	
Apr-9	Kannur (4), Kasargod (4), Kollam (1), Malappuram (2), Thiruvananthapuram (1)	None	11	357	PTP	
Apr-9	Kannur (4), Kasargod (4), Kollam (1), Malappuram (2), Thiruvananthapuram (1)	UAE	1	357	T	
Apr-10	Kannur (2), Kasargod (3), Malappuram (2)	Delhi	2	364	PTP	
Apr-10	Kannur (2), Kasargod (3), Malappuram (2)	None	5	364	PTP	
Apr-11	Kannur (7), Kasargod (2), Kozhikode (1)	Overseas	3	373	T	
Apr-11	Kannur (7), Kasargod (2), Kozhikode (1)	None	7	373	PTP	
Apr-12	Kannur (1), Pathanamthitta (1)	UAE	2	375	T	
Apr-13	Kannur (2), Palakkad (1)	None	2	378	PTP	
Apr-13	Kannur (2), Palakkad (1)	Overseas	1	378	T	
Apr-14	Kannur (4), Kasargod (1), Kozhikode (3)	UAE	5	386	T	
Apr-14	Kannur (4), Kasargod (1), Kozhikode (3)	None	3	386	PTP	
Apr-15	Kannur	None	1	387	PTP	
16-Apr	Kannur (2), Kasargod (1), Kozhikode (2)	Overseas	5	394	T	
16-Apr	Kannur	None	2	394	PTP	
17-Apr	Kozhikode	None	1	395	PTP	
18-Apr	Kannur (2), Kozhikode (1)	UAE	3	399	T	
18-Apr	Kannur	None	1	399	PTP	
19-Apr	Kannur (1), Kasargod (1)	UAE	2	401	T	
20-Apr	Kannur	UAE	5	407	T	
20-Apr	Kannur	None	1	407	PTP	
21-Apr	Kasargod (3), Kannur (9)	UAE	12	426	T	
21-Apr	Kollam (1), Malappuram (1), Palakkad (4)	Tamil Nadu	5	426	T	
21-Apr	Kannur	None	1	426	PTP	
22-Apr	Kannur (7), Kozhikode (2), Malappuram (1)	UAE	4	437	T	
22-Apr	Kannur (7), Kozhikode (2), Malappuram (1)	None	6	437	PTP	
22-Apr	Kottayam	Australia	1	437	T	
23-Apr	Idukki (4), Kollam (1), Kottayam (2), Kozhikode (2), Thiruvananthapuram (1)	None	4	447	PTP	
23-Apr	Idukki (4), Kollam (1), Kottayam (2), Kozhikode (2), Thiruvananthapuram (1)	Tamil Nadu	4	447	T	
23-Apr	Idukki (4), Kollam (1), Kottayam (2), Kozhikode (2), Thiruvananthapuram (1)	UAE	2	447	T	
24-Apr	Kasargod	None	3	450	PTP	
25-Apr	Kannur (1), Kollam (3), Kottayam (3)	None	7	457	PTP	
26-Apr	Idukki (3), Kottayam (5)	None	8	468	PTP	
26-Apr	Idukki	Spain	1	468	T	
26-Apr	Idukki	Tamil Nadu	2	468	T	
27-Apr	Idukki (4), Kannur (1), Kottayam (6), Malappuram (1), Palakkad (1)	Tamil Nadu	5	481	T	
27-Apr	Idukki (4), Kannur (1), Kottayam (6), Malappuram (1), Palakkad (1)	None	7	481	PTP	
27-Apr	Idukki (4), Kannur (1), Kottayam (6), Malappuram (1), Palakkad (1)	Overseas	1	481	T	
Apr-28	Kannur (3), Kasargod (1)	Overseas	2	485	T	
Apr-28	Kannur (3), Kasargod (1)	None	2	485	PTP	
Apr-29	Kasargod (2), Kollam (5)	None	7	495	PTP	
Apr-29	Thiruvananthapuram	Tamil Nadu	1	495	T	
Apr-29	Kollam, Thiruvananthapuram	Overseas	2	495	T	
Apr-30	Malappuram	Maharashtra	1	497	T	
Apr-30	Kasargod	None	1	497	PTP	
May-2	Kannur (1), Wayanad (1)	None	2	499	PTP	
May-8	Ernakulam	Tamil Nadu	1	503	T	
May-9	Malappuram	UAE	2	505	T	
May-10	Ernakulam (1), Wayanad (2)	None	3	512	PTP	
May-10	Malappuram (1), Thrissur (2)	UAE	3	512	T	
May-10	Wayanad	Tamil Nadu	1	512	T	
May-11	Kasargod	Maharashtra	4	519	T	
May-11	Palakkad	Tamil Nadu	1	519	T	
May-11	Malappuram	Kuwait	1	519	T	
May-11	Wayanad	None	1	519	PTP	
May-12	Kottayam (1), Malappuram (3), Pathanamthitta (1)	UAE	4	524	T	
May-12	Kottayam (1), Malappuram (3), Pathanamthitta (1)	Tamil Nadu	1	524	T	
May-13	Kannur (1), Kottayam (1), Kozhikode (1), Malappuram (3), Palakkad (2), Wayanad (2)	UAE	4	534	T	
May-13	Kannur (1), Kottayam (1), Kozhikode (1), Malappuram (3), Palakkad (2), Wayanad (2)	Kuwait	4	534	T	
May-13	Kannur (1), Kottayam (1), Kozhikode (1), Malappuram (3), Palakkad (2), Wayanad (2)	None	4	534	PTP	
May-13	Kannur (1), Kottayam (1), Kozhikode (1), Malappuram (3), Palakkad (2), Wayanad (2)	Tamil Nadu	2	534	T	
May-14	Kasargod (7), Palakkad (1), Wayanad (3)	None	11	560	PTP	
May-14	Kannur (2), Kasargod (3), Kozhikode (1), Malappuram (5), Palakkad (2), Pathanamthitta (1)	Kuwait	7	560	T	
May-14	Kannur (2), Kasargod (3), Kozhikode (1), Malappuram (5), Palakkad (2), Pathanamthitta (1)	Saudi Arabia	7	560	T	
May-14	Kannur (2), Kasargod (3), Kozhikode (1), Malappuram (5), Palakkad (2), Pathanamthitta (1)	UAE	7	560	T	
May-14	Kannur (2), Kasargod (3), Kozhikode (1), Malappuram (5), Palakkad (2), Pathanamthitta (1)	Maharashtra	4	560	T	
May-14	Kannur (2), Kasargod (3), Kozhikode (1), Malappuram (5), Palakkad (2), Pathanamthitta (1)	Tamil Nadu	2	560	T	
May-14	Kannur (2), Kasargod (3), Kozhikode (1), Malappuram (5), Palakkad (2), Pathanamthitta (1)	Karnataka	1	560	T	
May-14	Idukki	Sentinel Survey	1	560	T	
May-15	Alappuzha (2), Kasargod (1), Kollam (1), Kozhikode (2), Malappuram (4), Palakkad (1), Wayanad (5)	Overseas	7	576	T	
May-15	Alappuzha (2), Kasargod (1), Kollam (1), Kozhikode (2), Malappuram (4), Palakkad (1), Wayanad (5)	Tamil Nadu	4	576	T	
May-15	Alappuzha (2), Kasargod (1), Kollam (1), Kozhikode (2), Malappuram (4), Palakkad (1), Wayanad (5)	Maharashtra	2	576	T	
May-15	Alappuzha (2), Kasargod (1), Kollam (1), Kozhikode (2), Malappuram (4), Palakkad (1), Wayanad (5)	None	3	576	PTP	
May-16	Kozhikode (3), Malappuram (2), Palakkad (2), Thrissur (4)	Overseas	7	587	T	
May-16	Kozhikode (3), Malappuram (2), Palakkad (2), Thrissur (4)	Tamil Nadu	2	587	T	
May-16	Kozhikode (3), Malappuram (2), Palakkad (2), Thrissur (4)	Maharashtra	2	587	T	
May-17	Kannur (2), Kasargod (1), Malappuram (4), Palakkad (2), Thrissur (1)	Tamil Nadu	7	601	T	
May-17	Kannur (2), Kasargod (1), Malappuram (4), Palakkad (2), Thrissur (1)	Maharashtra	3	601	T	
May-17	Kozhikode	Kuwait	2	601	T	
May-17	Kozhikode	UAE	2	601	T	
May-17	Ernakulam (Uttar Pradesh native)	Maldives	1	601	T	
May-17	Kollam	None	1	601	PTP	
May-18	Alappuzha (2), Ernakulam (1), Kannur (2), Kasargod (2), Kollam (6), Kottayam (2), Kozhikode (2), Malappuram (1), Palakkad (1), Pathanamthitta (2), Thiruvananthapuram (3), Thrissur (4)	Overseas	21	630	T	
May-18	Alappuzha (2), Ernakulam (1), Kannur (2), Kasargod (2), Kollam (6), Kottayam (2), Kozhikode (2), Malappuram (1), Palakkad (1), Pathanamthitta (2), Thiruvananthapuram (3), Thrissur (4)	Other states	7	630	T	
May-18	Kannur	None	1	630	PTP	
May-19	Alappuzha (1), Kannur (5), Malappuram (3), Palakkad (1), Pathanamthitta (1), Thrissur (1)	Maharashtra	6	642	T	
May-19	Alappuzha (1), Kannur (5), Malappuram (3), Palakkad (1), Pathanamthitta (1), Thrissur (1)	Overseas	4	642	T	
May-19	Alappuzha (1), Kannur (5), Malappuram (3), Palakkad (1), Pathanamthitta (1), Thrissur (1)	Gujarat	1	642	T	
May-19	Alappuzha (1), Kannur (5), Malappuram (3), Palakkad (1), Pathanamthitta (1), Thrissur (1)	Tamil Nadu	1	642	T	
May-20	Alappuzha (1), Ernakulam (1), Kannur (2), Kasargod (1), Kozhikode (1), Malappuram (4), Palakkad (7), Pathanamthitta (2), Thiruvananthapuram (2), Thrissur (2)	Overseas	12	666	T	
May-20	Alappuzha (1), Ernakulam (1), Kannur (2), Kasargod (1), Kozhikode (1), Malappuram (4), Palakkad (7), Pathanamthitta (2), Thiruvananthapuram (2), Thrissur (2)	Maharashtra	8	666	T	
May-20	Alappuzha (1), Ernakulam (1), Kannur (2), Kasargod (1), Kozhikode (1), Malappuram (4), Palakkad (7), Pathanamthitta (2), Thiruvananthapuram (2), Thrissur (2)	Tamil Nadu	3	666	T	
May-20	Kannur	None	1	666	PTP	
May-21	Alappuzha (2), Idukki(1), Kannur (4), Kasargod (1), Kollam (2), Kottayam (3), Malappuram (5), Palakkad (1), Thiruvananthapuram (2), Thrissur (3)	Overseas	14	690	T	
May-21	Alappuzha (2), Idukki(1), Kannur (4), Kasargod (1), Kollam (2), Kottayam (3), Malappuram (5), Palakkad (1), Thiruvananthapuram (2), Thrissur (3)	Maharashtra	5	690	T	
May-21	Alappuzha (2), Idukki(1), Kannur (4), Kasargod (1), Kollam (2), Kottayam (3), Malappuram (5), Palakkad (1), Thiruvananthapuram (2), Thrissur (3)	Tamil Nadu	3	690	T	
May-21	Alappuzha (2), Idukki(1), Kannur (4), Kasargod (1), Kollam (2), Kottayam (3), Malappuram (5), Palakkad (1), Thiruvananthapuram (2), Thrissur (3)	Andhra Pradesh	1	690	T	
May-21	Alappuzha (2), Idukki(1), Kannur (4), Kasargod (1), Kollam (2), Kottayam (3), Malappuram (5), Palakkad (1), Thiruvananthapuram (2), Thrissur (3)	Gujarat	1	690	T	
May-22	Kannur (12), Kasargod (7), Kollam (1), Kottayam (2), Kozhikode (5), Malappuram (4), Palakkad (5), Pathanamthitta (1), Thrissur (4), Wayanad (1)	Maharashtra	21	732	T	
May-22	Kannur (12), Kasargod (7), Kollam (1), Kottayam (2), Kozhikode (5), Malappuram (4), Palakkad (5), Pathanamthitta (1), Thrissur (4), Wayanad (1)	Overseas	17	732	T	
May-22	Kannur (12), Kasargod (7), Kollam (1), Kottayam (2), Kozhikode (5), Malappuram (4), Palakkad (5), Pathanamthitta (1), Thrissur (4), Wayanad (1)	None	2	732	PTP	
May-22	Kannur (12), Kasargod (7), Kollam (1), Kottayam (2), Kozhikode (5), Malappuram (4), Palakkad (5), Pathanamthitta (1), Thrissur (4), Wayanad (1)	Andhra Pradesh	1	732	T	
May-22	Kannur (12), Kasargod (7), Kollam (1), Kottayam (2), Kozhikode (5), Malappuram (4), Palakkad (5), Pathanamthitta (1), Thrissur (4), Wayanad (1)	Tamil Nadu	1	732	T	
May-23	Alappuzha (5), Kannur (16), Kasargod (4), Kollam (3), Kottayam (2), Kozhikode (4), Malappuram (8), Palakkad (19), Wayanad (1)	Overseas	18	794	T	
May-23	Alappuzha (5), Kannur (16), Kasargod (4), Kollam (3), Kottayam (2), Kozhikode (4), Malappuram (8), Palakkad (19), Wayanad (1)	None	13	794	PTP	
May-23	Alappuzha (5), Kannur (16), Kasargod (4), Kollam (3), Kottayam (2), Kozhikode (4), Malappuram (8), Palakkad (19), Wayanad (1)	Maharashtra	13	794	T	
May-23	Alappuzha (5), Kannur (16), Kasargod (4), Kollam (3), Kottayam (2), Kozhikode (4), Malappuram (8), Palakkad (19), Wayanad (1)	Tamil Nadu	12	794	T	
May-23	Alappuzha (5), Kannur (16), Kasargod (4), Kollam (3), Kottayam (2), Kozhikode (4), Malappuram (8), Palakkad (19), Wayanad (1)	Gujarat	2	794	T	
May-23	Alappuzha (5), Kannur (16), Kasargod (4), Kollam (3), Kottayam (2), Kozhikode (4), Malappuram (8), Palakkad (19), Wayanad (1)	Karnataka	2	794	T	
May-23	Alappuzha (5), Kannur (16), Kasargod (4), Kollam (3), Kottayam (2), Kozhikode (4), Malappuram (8), Palakkad (19), Wayanad (1)	New Delhi	1	794	T	
May-23	Alappuzha (5), Kannur (16), Kasargod (4), Kollam (3), Kottayam (2), Kozhikode (4), Malappuram (8), Palakkad (19), Wayanad (1)	Uttar Pradesh	1	794	T	
May-24	Alappuzha (4), Ernakulam (4), Kannur (12), Kasargod (5), Kollam (3), Kozhikode (1), Malappuram (5), Palakkad (4), Pathanamthitta (5), Thiruvananthapuram (12)	Maharashtra	19	847	T	
May-24	Alappuzha (4), Ernakulam (4), Kannur (12), Kasargod (5), Kollam (3), Kozhikode (1), Malappuram (5), Palakkad (4), Pathanamthitta (5), Thiruvananthapuram (12)	Overseas	18	847	T	
May-24	Alappuzha (4), Ernakulam (4), Kannur (12), Kasargod (5), Kollam (3), Kozhikode (1), Malappuram (5), Palakkad (4), Pathanamthitta (5), Thiruvananthapuram (12)	Gujarat	5	847	T	
May-24	Alappuzha (4), Ernakulam (4), Kannur (12), Kasargod (5), Kollam (3), Kozhikode (1), Malappuram (5), Palakkad (4), Pathanamthitta (5), Thiruvananthapuram (12)	None	5	847	PTP	
May-24	Alappuzha (4), Ernakulam (4), Kannur (12), Kasargod (5), Kollam (3), Kozhikode (1), Malappuram (5), Palakkad (4), Pathanamthitta (5), Thiruvananthapuram (12)	Tamil Nadu	4	847	T	
May-24	Alappuzha (4), Ernakulam (4), Kannur (12), Kasargod (5), Kollam (3), Kozhikode (1), Malappuram (5), Palakkad (4), Pathanamthitta (5), Thiruvananthapuram (12)	Madhya Pradesh	1	847	T	
May-24	Alappuzha (4), Ernakulam (4), Kannur (12), Kasargod (5), Kollam (3), Kozhikode (1), Malappuram (5), Palakkad (4), Pathanamthitta (5), Thiruvananthapuram (12)	New Delhi	1	847	T	
May-25	Alappuzha (3), Idukki (1), Kannur (10), Kasargod (14), Kollam (2), Kottayam (2), Kozhikode (4), Palakkad (5), Pathanamthitta (3), Thiruvananthapuram (5)	Maharashtra	25	896	T	
May-25	Alappuzha (3), Idukki (1), Kannur (10), Kasargod (14), Kollam (2), Kottayam (2), Kozhikode (4), Palakkad (5), Pathanamthitta (3), Thiruvananthapuram (5)	Overseas	18	896	T	
May-25	Alappuzha (3), Idukki (1), Kannur (10), Kasargod (14), Kollam (2), Kottayam (2), Kozhikode (4), Palakkad (5), Pathanamthitta (3), Thiruvananthapuram (5)	None	6	896	PTP	
May-26	Alappuzha (3), Ernakulam (5), Kasargod (3), Kannur (8), Kollam (4), Kottayam (6), Malappuram (5), Palakkad (29), Thrissur (4)	Overseas	27	963	T	
May-26	Alappuzha (3), Ernakulam (5), Kasargod (3), Kannur (8), Kollam (4), Kottayam (6), Malappuram (5), Palakkad (29), Thrissur (4)	Maharashtra	15	963	T	
May-26	Alappuzha (3), Ernakulam (5), Kasargod (3), Kannur (8), Kollam (4), Kottayam (6), Malappuram (5), Palakkad (29), Thrissur (4)	Tamil Nadu	9	963	T	
May-26	Alappuzha (3), Ernakulam (5), Kasargod (3), Kannur (8), Kollam (4), Kottayam (6), Malappuram (5), Palakkad (29), Thrissur (4)	None	7	963	PTP	
May-26	Alappuzha (3), Ernakulam (5), Kasargod (3), Kannur (8), Kollam (4), Kottayam (6), Malappuram (5), Palakkad (29), Thrissur (4)	Gujarat	5	963	T	
May-26	Alappuzha (3), Ernakulam (5), Kasargod (3), Kannur (8), Kollam (4), Kottayam (6), Malappuram (5), Palakkad (29), Thrissur (4)	Karnataka	2	963	T	
May-27	Alappuzha (7), Ernakulam (2), Kasargod (10), Kannur (1), Kollam (4), Kozhikode (2), Palakkad (8), Pathanamthitta (3), Wayanad (3)	Maharashtra	16	1,003	T	
May-27	Alappuzha (7), Ernakulam (2), Kasargod (10), Kannur (1), Kollam (4), Kozhikode (2), Palakkad (8), Pathanamthitta (3), Wayanad (3)	Overseas	9	1,003	T	
May-27	Alappuzha (7), Ernakulam (2), Kasargod (10), Kannur (1), Kollam (4), Kozhikode (2), Palakkad (8), Pathanamthitta (3), Wayanad (3)	Tamil Nadu	5	1,003	T	
May-27	Alappuzha (7), Ernakulam (2), Kasargod (10), Kannur (1), Kollam (4), Kozhikode (2), Palakkad (8), Pathanamthitta (3), Wayanad (3)	New Delhi	3	1,003	T	
May-27	Alappuzha (7), Ernakulam (2), Kasargod (10), Kannur (1), Kollam (4), Kozhikode (2), Palakkad (8), Pathanamthitta (3), Wayanad (3)	None	3	1,003	PTP	
May-27	Alappuzha (7), Ernakulam (2), Kasargod (10), Kannur (1), Kollam (4), Kozhikode (2), Palakkad (8), Pathanamthitta (3), Wayanad (3)	Andhra Pradesh	1	1,003	T	
May-27	Alappuzha (7), Ernakulam (2), Kasargod (10), Kannur (1), Kollam (4), Kozhikode (2), Palakkad (8), Pathanamthitta (3), Wayanad (3)	Karnataka	1	1,003	T	
May-27	Alappuzha (7), Ernakulam (2), Kasargod (10), Kannur (1), Kollam (4), Kozhikode (2), Palakkad (8), Pathanamthitta (3), Wayanad (3)	Telangana	1	1,003	T	
May-27	Alappuzha (7), Ernakulam (2), Kasargod (10), Kannur (1), Kollam (4), Kozhikode (2), Palakkad (8), Pathanamthitta (3), Wayanad (3)	Uttar Pradesh	1	1,003	T	
May-28	Alappuzha (1), Idukki (1), Kasargod (18), Kannur (10), Malappuram (8), Kollam (1), Kottayam (3), Kozhikode (6), Palakkad (16), Pathanamthitta (6), Thiruvananthapuram (7), Thrissur (7)	Overseas	31	1,088	T	
May-28	Alappuzha (1), Idukki (1), Kasargod (18), Kannur (10), Malappuram (8), Kollam (1), Kottayam (3), Kozhikode (6), Palakkad (16), Pathanamthitta (6), Thiruvananthapuram (7), Thrissur (7)	Maharashtra	31	1,088	T	
May-28	Alappuzha (1), Idukki (1), Kasargod (18), Kannur (10), Malappuram (8), Kollam (1), Kottayam (3), Kozhikode (6), Palakkad (16), Pathanamthitta (6), Thiruvananthapuram (7), Thrissur (7)	Tamil Nadu	9	1,088	T	
May-28	Alappuzha (1), Idukki (1), Kasargod (18), Kannur (10), Malappuram (8), Kollam (1), Kottayam (3), Kozhikode (6), Palakkad (16), Pathanamthitta (6), Thiruvananthapuram (7), Thrissur (7)	None	5	1,088	PTP	
May-28	Alappuzha (1), Idukki (1), Kasargod (18), Kannur (10), Malappuram (8), Kollam (1), Kottayam (3), Kozhikode (6), Palakkad (16), Pathanamthitta (6), Thiruvananthapuram (7), Thrissur (7)	Karnataka	3	1,088	T	
May-28	Alappuzha (1), Idukki (1), Kasargod (18), Kannur (10), Malappuram (8), Kollam (1), Kottayam (3), Kozhikode (6), Palakkad (16), Pathanamthitta (6), Thiruvananthapuram (7), Thrissur (7)	Gujarat	2	1,088	T	
May-28	Alappuzha (1), Idukki (1), Kasargod (18), Kannur (10), Malappuram (8), Kollam (1), Kottayam (3), Kozhikode (6), Palakkad (16), Pathanamthitta (6), Thiruvananthapuram (7), Thrissur (7)	New Delhi	2	1,088	T	
May-28	Alappuzha (1), Idukki (1), Kasargod (18), Kannur (10), Malappuram (8), Kollam (1), Kottayam (3), Kozhikode (6), Palakkad (16), Pathanamthitta (6), Thiruvananthapuram (7), Thrissur (7)	Andhra Pradesh	1	1,088	T	
May-29	Alappuzha (3), Ernakulam (4), Idukki (1), Kasargod (4), Kannur (7), Malappuram (5), Kollam (2), Kottayam (3), Kozhikode (1), Palakkad (14), Pathanamthitta (5), Thiruvananthapuram (5), Thrissur (6), Wayanad (2)	Overseas	33	1,150	T	
May-29	Alappuzha (3), Ernakulam (4), Idukki (1), Kasargod (4), Kannur (7), Malappuram (5), Kollam (2), Kottayam (3), Kozhikode (1), Palakkad (14), Pathanamthitta (5), Thiruvananthapuram (5), Thrissur (6), Wayanad (2)	Maharashtra	10	1,150	T	
May-29	Alappuzha (3), Ernakulam (4), Idukki (1), Kasargod (4), Kannur (7), Malappuram (5), Kollam (2), Kottayam (3), Kozhikode (1), Palakkad (14), Pathanamthitta (5), Thiruvananthapuram (5), Thrissur (6), Wayanad (2)	Tamil Nadu	10	1,150	T	
May-29	Alappuzha (3), Ernakulam (4), Idukki (1), Kasargod (4), Kannur (7), Malappuram (5), Kollam (2), Kottayam (3), Kozhikode (1), Palakkad (14), Pathanamthitta (5), Thiruvananthapuram (5), Thrissur (6), Wayanad (2)	None	6	1,150	PTP	
May-29	Alappuzha (3), Ernakulam (4), Idukki (1), Kasargod (4), Kannur (7), Malappuram (5), Kollam (2), Kottayam (3), Kozhikode (1), Palakkad (14), Pathanamthitta (5), Thiruvananthapuram (5), Thrissur (6), Wayanad (2)	Karnataka	1	1,150	T	
May-29	Alappuzha (3), Ernakulam (4), Idukki (1), Kasargod (4), Kannur (7), Malappuram (5), Kollam (2), Kottayam (3), Kozhikode (1), Palakkad (14), Pathanamthitta (5), Thiruvananthapuram (5), Thrissur (6), Wayanad (2)	New Delhi	1	1,150	T	
May-30	Alappuzha (2), Ernakulam (4), Idukki (4), Kasargod (3), Kannur (8), Kollam (4), Kottayam (1), Kozhikode (4), Palakkad (9), Thiruvananthapuram (2), Thrissur (10), Others - Air India cabin crew (7)	Maharashtra	19	1,208	T	
May-30	Alappuzha (2), Ernakulam (4), Idukki (4), Kasargod (3), Kannur (8), Kollam (4), Kottayam (1), Kozhikode (4), Palakkad (9), Thiruvananthapuram (2), Thrissur (10), Others - Air India cabin crew (7)	Overseas	12	1,208	T	
May-30	Alappuzha (2), Ernakulam (4), Idukki (4), Kasargod (3), Kannur (8), Kollam (4), Kottayam (1), Kozhikode (4), Palakkad (9), Thiruvananthapuram (2), Thrissur (10), Others - Air India cabin crew (7)	None	10	1,208	PTP	
May-30	Alappuzha (2), Ernakulam (4), Idukki (4), Kasargod (3), Kannur (8), Kollam (4), Kottayam (1), Kozhikode (4), Palakkad (9), Thiruvananthapuram (2), Thrissur (10), Others - Air India cabin crew (7)	Tamil Nadu	9	1,208	T	
May-30	Alappuzha (2), Ernakulam (4), Idukki (4), Kasargod (3), Kannur (8), Kollam (4), Kottayam (1), Kozhikode (4), Palakkad (9), Thiruvananthapuram (2), Thrissur (10), Others - Air India cabin crew (7)	Karnataka	1	1,208	T	
May-30	Alappuzha (2), Ernakulam (4), Idukki (4), Kasargod (3), Kannur (8), Kollam (4), Kottayam (1), Kozhikode (4), Palakkad (9), Thiruvananthapuram (2), Thrissur (10), Others - Air India cabin crew (7)	New Delhi	1	1,208	T	
May-30	Alappuzha (2), Ernakulam (4), Idukki (4), Kasargod (3), Kannur (8), Kollam (4), Kottayam (1), Kozhikode (4), Palakkad (9), Thiruvananthapuram (2), Thrissur (10), Others - Air India cabin crew (7)	Telangana	1	1,208	T	
May-31	Alappuzha (6), Ernakulam (1), Kasargod (10), Kannur (7), Kollam (6), Kozhikode (2), Malappuram (3), Palakkad (12), Pathanamthitta (4), Thiruvananthapuram (4), Thrissur (3), Wayanad (3)	Maharashtra	20	1,269	T	
May-31	Alappuzha (6), Ernakulam (1), Kasargod (10), Kannur (7), Kollam (6), Kozhikode (2), Malappuram (3), Palakkad (12), Pathanamthitta (4), Thiruvananthapuram (4), Thrissur (3), Wayanad (3)	Overseas	20	1,269	T	
May-31	Alappuzha (6), Ernakulam (1), Kasargod (10), Kannur (7), Kollam (6), Kozhikode (2), Malappuram (3), Palakkad (12), Pathanamthitta (4), Thiruvananthapuram (4), Thrissur (3), Wayanad (3)	Tamil Nadu	6	1,269	T	
May-31	Alappuzha (6), Ernakulam (1), Kasargod (10), Kannur (7), Kollam (6), Kozhikode (2), Malappuram (3), Palakkad (12), Pathanamthitta (4), Thiruvananthapuram (4), Thrissur (3), Wayanad (3)	New Delhi	5	1,269	T	
May-31	Alappuzha (6), Ernakulam (1), Kasargod (10), Kannur (7), Kollam (6), Kozhikode (2), Malappuram (3), Palakkad (12), Pathanamthitta (4), Thiruvananthapuram (4), Thrissur (3), Wayanad (3)	Karnataka	4	1,269	T	
May-31	Alappuzha (6), Ernakulam (1), Kasargod (10), Kannur (7), Kollam (6), Kozhikode (2), Malappuram (3), Palakkad (12), Pathanamthitta (4), Thiruvananthapuram (4), Thrissur (3), Wayanad (3)	None	4	1,269	PTP	
May-31	Alappuzha (6), Ernakulam (1), Kasargod (10), Kannur (7), Kollam (6), Kozhikode (2), Malappuram (3), Palakkad (12), Pathanamthitta (4), Thiruvananthapuram (4), Thrissur (3), Wayanad (3)	Gujarat	1	1,269	T	
June-1	Alappuzha (2), Ernakulam (3), Idukki (1), Kasargod (14), Kollam (5), Malappuram (14), Palakkad (2), Pathanamthitta (4), Thiruvananthapuram (3), Thrissur (9), Primary Contact (1), Air India Crew (1)	Overseas	27	1,326	T	
June-1	Alappuzha (2), Ernakulam (3), Idukki (1), Kasargod (14), Kollam (5), Malappuram (14), Palakkad (2), Pathanamthitta (4), Thiruvananthapuram (3), Thrissur (9), Primary Contact (1), Air India Crew (1)	Other states	28	1,326	T	
June-1	Alappuzha (2), Ernakulam (3), Idukki (1), Kasargod (14), Kollam (5), Malappuram (14), Palakkad (2), Pathanamthitta (4), Thiruvananthapuram (3), Thrissur (9), Primary Contact (1), Air India Crew (1)	None	2	1,326	PTP	
June-2	Alappuzha (10), Ernakulam (3), Kannur (5), Kasargod (9), Kollam (8), Kottayam (6), Kozhikode (5), Malappuram (15), Palakkad (5), Pathanamthitta (1), Thiruvananthapuram (7), Thrissur (6), Wayanad (6)	Overseas	46	1,412	T	
June-2	Alappuzha (10), Ernakulam (3), Kannur (5), Kasargod (9), Kollam (8), Kottayam (6), Kozhikode (5), Malappuram (15), Palakkad (5), Pathanamthitta (1), Thiruvananthapuram (7), Thrissur (6), Wayanad (6)	None	12	1,412	PTP	
June-2	Alappuzha (10), Ernakulam (3), Kannur (5), Kasargod (9), Kollam (8), Kottayam (6), Kozhikode (5), Malappuram (15), Palakkad (5), Pathanamthitta (1), Thiruvananthapuram (7), Thrissur (6), Wayanad (6)	Maharashtra	9	1,412	T	
June-2	Alappuzha (10), Ernakulam (3), Kannur (5), Kasargod (9), Kollam (8), Kottayam (6), Kozhikode (5), Malappuram (15), Palakkad (5), Pathanamthitta (1), Thiruvananthapuram (7), Thrissur (6), Wayanad (6)	Tamil Nadu	7	1,412	T	
June-2	Alappuzha (10), Ernakulam (3), Kannur (5), Kasargod (9), Kollam (8), Kottayam (6), Kozhikode (5), Malappuram (15), Palakkad (5), Pathanamthitta (1), Thiruvananthapuram (7), Thrissur (6), Wayanad (6)	Karnataka	5	1,412	T	
June-2	Alappuzha (10), Ernakulam (3), Kannur (5), Kasargod (9), Kollam (8), Kottayam (6), Kozhikode (5), Malappuram (15), Palakkad (5), Pathanamthitta (1), Thiruvananthapuram (7), Thrissur (6), Wayanad (6)	Delhi	3	1,412	T	
June-3	Alappuzha (7), Ernakulam (5), Idukki (9), Kannur (2), Kasargod (3), Kollam (5), Kottayam (8), Kozhikode (7), Malappuram (11), Palakkad (5), Pathanamthitta (2), Thiruvananthapuram (14), Thrissur (4)	Overseas	53	1,494	T	
June-3	Alappuzha (7), Ernakulam (5), Idukki (9), Kannur (2), Kasargod (3), Kollam (5), Kottayam (8), Kozhikode (7), Malappuram (11), Palakkad (5), Pathanamthitta (2), Thiruvananthapuram (14), Thrissur (4)	Other states	19	1,494	T	
June-3	Alappuzha (7), Ernakulam (5), Idukki (9), Kannur (2), Kasargod (3), Kollam (5), Kottayam (8), Kozhikode (7), Malappuram (11), Palakkad (5), Pathanamthitta (2), Thiruvananthapuram (14), Thrissur (4)	None	10	1,494	PTP	
June-4	Alappuzha (8), Ernakulam (2), Kannur (6), Kasargod (12), Kollam (11), Kottayam (5), Kozhikode (10), Malappuram (8), Palakkad (7), Pathanamthitta (14), Thiruvananthapuram (5), Thrissur (4), Wayanad (2)	Overseas	47	1,588	T	
June-4	Alappuzha (8), Ernakulam (2), Kannur (6), Kasargod (12), Kollam (11), Kottayam (5), Kozhikode (10), Malappuram (8), Palakkad (7), Pathanamthitta (14), Thiruvananthapuram (5), Thrissur (4), Wayanad (2)	Maharashtra	23	1,588	T	
June-4	Alappuzha (8), Ernakulam (2), Kannur (6), Kasargod (12), Kollam (11), Kottayam (5), Kozhikode (10), Malappuram (8), Palakkad (7), Pathanamthitta (14), Thiruvananthapuram (5), Thrissur (4), Wayanad (2)	None	7	1,588	PTP	
June-4	Alappuzha (8), Ernakulam (2), Kannur (6), Kasargod (12), Kollam (11), Kottayam (5), Kozhikode (10), Malappuram (8), Palakkad (7), Pathanamthitta (14), Thiruvananthapuram (5), Thrissur (4), Wayanad (2)	Tamil Nadu	8	1,588	T	
June-4	Alappuzha (8), Ernakulam (2), Kannur (6), Kasargod (12), Kollam (11), Kottayam (5), Kozhikode (10), Malappuram (8), Palakkad (7), Pathanamthitta (14), Thiruvananthapuram (5), Thrissur (4), Wayanad (2)	Delhi	3	1,588	T	
June-4	Alappuzha (8), Ernakulam (2), Kannur (6), Kasargod (12), Kollam (11), Kottayam (5), Kozhikode (10), Malappuram (8), Palakkad (7), Pathanamthitta (14), Thiruvananthapuram (5), Thrissur (4), Wayanad (2)	Gujarat	2	1,588	T	
June-4	Alappuzha (8), Ernakulam (2), Kannur (6), Kasargod (12), Kollam (11), Kottayam (5), Kozhikode (10), Malappuram (8), Palakkad (7), Pathanamthitta (14), Thiruvananthapuram (5), Thrissur (4), Wayanad (2)	Rajasthan	1	1,588	T	
June-5	Alappuzha (5), Ernakulam (10), Idukki (3), Kasargod (1), Kollam (2), Kottayam (1), Kozhikode (4), Malappuram (18), Palakkad (40), Pathanamthitta (11), Thiruvananthapuram (5), Thrissur (8), Wayanad (3)	Overseas	50	1,699	T	
June-5	Alappuzha (5), Ernakulam (10), Idukki (3), Kasargod (1), Kollam (2), Kottayam (1), Kozhikode (4), Malappuram (18), Palakkad (40), Pathanamthitta (11), Thiruvananthapuram (5), Thrissur (8), Wayanad (3)	Other states	48	1,699	T	
June-5	Alappuzha (5), Ernakulam (10), Idukki (3), Kasargod (1), Kollam (2), Kottayam (1), Kozhikode (4), Malappuram (18), Palakkad (40), Pathanamthitta (11), Thiruvananthapuram (5), Thrissur (8), Wayanad (3)	None	10	1,699	PTP	
June-6	Alappuzha (4), Ernakulam (3), Idukki (3), Kannur (12), Kasargod (10), Kollam (19), Kottayam (2), Kozhikode (4), Malappuram (12), Palakkad (11), Pathanamthitta (9), Thiruvananthapuram (3), Thrissur (16)	UAE	28	1,807	T	
June-6	Alappuzha (4), Ernakulam (3), Idukki (3), Kannur (12), Kasargod (10), Kollam (19), Kottayam (2), Kozhikode (4), Malappuram (12), Palakkad (11), Pathanamthitta (9), Thiruvananthapuram (3), Thrissur (16)	Maharashtra	15	1,807	T	
June-6	Alappuzha (4), Ernakulam (3), Idukki (3), Kannur (12), Kasargod (10), Kollam (19), Kottayam (2), Kozhikode (4), Malappuram (12), Palakkad (11), Pathanamthitta (9), Thiruvananthapuram (3), Thrissur (16)	Kuwait	14	1,807	T	
June-6	Alappuzha (4), Ernakulam (3), Idukki (3), Kannur (12), Kasargod (10), Kollam (19), Kottayam (2), Kozhikode (4), Malappuram (12), Palakkad (11), Pathanamthitta (9), Thiruvananthapuram (3), Thrissur (16)	Tajikistan	13	1,807	T	
June-6	Alappuzha (4), Ernakulam (3), Idukki (3), Kannur (12), Kasargod (10), Kollam (19), Kottayam (2), Kozhikode (4), Malappuram (12), Palakkad (11), Pathanamthitta (9), Thiruvananthapuram (3), Thrissur (16)	None	10	1,807	PTP	
June-6	Alappuzha (4), Ernakulam (3), Idukki (3), Kannur (12), Kasargod (10), Kollam (19), Kottayam (2), Kozhikode (4), Malappuram (12), Palakkad (11), Pathanamthitta (9), Thiruvananthapuram (3), Thrissur (16)	Delhi	8	1,807	T	
June-6	Alappuzha (4), Ernakulam (3), Idukki (3), Kannur (12), Kasargod (10), Kollam (19), Kottayam (2), Kozhikode (4), Malappuram (12), Palakkad (11), Pathanamthitta (9), Thiruvananthapuram (3), Thrissur (16)	Tamil Nadu	5	1,807	T	
June-6	Alappuzha (4), Ernakulam (3), Idukki (3), Kannur (12), Kasargod (10), Kollam (19), Kottayam (2), Kozhikode (4), Malappuram (12), Palakkad (11), Pathanamthitta (9), Thiruvananthapuram (3), Thrissur (16)	Gujarat	4	1,807	T	
June-6	Alappuzha (4), Ernakulam (3), Idukki (3), Kannur (12), Kasargod (10), Kollam (19), Kottayam (2), Kozhikode (4), Malappuram (12), Palakkad (11), Pathanamthitta (9), Thiruvananthapuram (3), Thrissur (16)	Saudi Arabia	4	1,807	T	
June-6	Alappuzha (4), Ernakulam (3), Idukki (3), Kannur (12), Kasargod (10), Kollam (19), Kottayam (2), Kozhikode (4), Malappuram (12), Palakkad (11), Pathanamthitta (9), Thiruvananthapuram (3), Thrissur (16)	Nigeria	3	1,807	T	
June-6	Alappuzha (4), Ernakulam (3), Idukki (3), Kannur (12), Kasargod (10), Kollam (19), Kottayam (2), Kozhikode (4), Malappuram (12), Palakkad (11), Pathanamthitta (9), Thiruvananthapuram (3), Thrissur (16)	Andhra Pradesh	1	1,807	T	
June-6	Alappuzha (4), Ernakulam (3), Idukki (3), Kannur (12), Kasargod (10), Kollam (19), Kottayam (2), Kozhikode (4), Malappuram (12), Palakkad (11), Pathanamthitta (9), Thiruvananthapuram (3), Thrissur (16)	Ireland	1	1,807	T	
June-6	Alappuzha (4), Ernakulam (3), Idukki (3), Kannur (12), Kasargod (10), Kollam (19), Kottayam (2), Kozhikode (4), Malappuram (12), Palakkad (11), Pathanamthitta (9), Thiruvananthapuram (3), Thrissur (16)	Madhya Pradesh	1	1,807	T	
June-6	Alappuzha (4), Ernakulam (3), Idukki (3), Kannur (12), Kasargod (10), Kollam (19), Kottayam (2), Kozhikode (4), Malappuram (12), Palakkad (11), Pathanamthitta (9), Thiruvananthapuram (3), Thrissur (16)	Oman	1	1,807	T	
June-7	Alappuzha (7), Idukki (1), Kannur (1), Kasargod (3), Kollam (9), Kottayam (3), Kozhikode (6), Malappuram (27), Palakkad (6), Pathanamthitta (13), Thiruvananthapuram (4), Thrissur (26)	UAE	39	1,914	T	
June-7	Alappuzha (7), Idukki (1), Kannur (1), Kasargod (3), Kollam (9), Kottayam (3), Kozhikode (6), Malappuram (27), Palakkad (6), Pathanamthitta (13), Thiruvananthapuram (4), Thrissur (26)	Kuwait	21	1,914	T	
June-7	Alappuzha (7), Idukki (1), Kannur (1), Kasargod (3), Kollam (9), Kottayam (3), Kozhikode (6), Malappuram (27), Palakkad (6), Pathanamthitta (13), Thiruvananthapuram (4), Thrissur (26)	Maharashtra	15	1,914	T	
June-7	Alappuzha (7), Idukki (1), Kannur (1), Kasargod (3), Kollam (9), Kottayam (3), Kozhikode (6), Malappuram (27), Palakkad (6), Pathanamthitta (13), Thiruvananthapuram (4), Thrissur (26)	None	8	1,914	PTP	
June-7	Alappuzha (7), Idukki (1), Kannur (1), Kasargod (3), Kollam (9), Kottayam (3), Kozhikode (6), Malappuram (27), Palakkad (6), Pathanamthitta (13), Thiruvananthapuram (4), Thrissur (26)	Tamil Nadu	7	1,914	T	
June-7	Alappuzha (7), Idukki (1), Kannur (1), Kasargod (3), Kollam (9), Kottayam (3), Kozhikode (6), Malappuram (27), Palakkad (6), Pathanamthitta (13), Thiruvananthapuram (4), Thrissur (26)	Delhi	4	1,914	T	
June-7	Alappuzha (7), Idukki (1), Kannur (1), Kasargod (3), Kollam (9), Kottayam (3), Kozhikode (6), Malappuram (27), Palakkad (6), Pathanamthitta (13), Thiruvananthapuram (4), Thrissur (26)	Saudi Arabia	4	1,914	T	
June-7	Alappuzha (7), Idukki (1), Kannur (1), Kasargod (3), Kollam (9), Kottayam (3), Kozhikode (6), Malappuram (27), Palakkad (6), Pathanamthitta (13), Thiruvananthapuram (4), Thrissur (26)	Russia	2	1,914	T	
June-7	Alappuzha (7), Idukki (1), Kannur (1), Kasargod (3), Kollam (9), Kottayam (3), Kozhikode (6), Malappuram (27), Palakkad (6), Pathanamthitta (13), Thiruvananthapuram (4), Thrissur (26)	Tajikistan	2	1,914	T	
June-7	Alappuzha (7), Idukki (1), Kannur (1), Kasargod (3), Kollam (9), Kottayam (3), Kozhikode (6), Malappuram (27), Palakkad (6), Pathanamthitta (13), Thiruvananthapuram (4), Thrissur (26)	Italy	1	1,914	T	
June-7	Alappuzha (7), Idukki (1), Kannur (1), Kasargod (3), Kollam (9), Kottayam (3), Kozhikode (6), Malappuram (27), Palakkad (6), Pathanamthitta (13), Thiruvananthapuram (4), Thrissur (26)	Gujarat	1	1,914	T	
June-7	Alappuzha (7), Idukki (1), Kannur (1), Kasargod (3), Kollam (9), Kottayam (3), Kozhikode (6), Malappuram (27), Palakkad (6), Pathanamthitta (13), Thiruvananthapuram (4), Thrissur (26)	Oman	1	1,914	T	
June-7	Alappuzha (7), Idukki (1), Kannur (1), Kasargod (3), Kollam (9), Kottayam (3), Kozhikode (6), Malappuram (27), Palakkad (6), Pathanamthitta (13), Thiruvananthapuram (4), Thrissur (26)	Qatar	1	1,914	T	
June-7	Alappuzha (7), Idukki (1), Kannur (1), Kasargod (3), Kollam (9), Kottayam (3), Kozhikode (6), Malappuram (27), Palakkad (6), Pathanamthitta (13), Thiruvananthapuram (4), Thrissur (26)	Telangana	1	1,914	T	
June-8	Alappuzha (5), Ernakulam (3), Kannur (4), Kasargod (8), Kollam (5), Kottayam (3), Kozhikode (13), Malappuram (14), Palakkad (1), Pathanamthitta (3), Thiruvananthapuram (3), Thrissur (27), Wayanad (2)	UAE	42	2,005	T	
June-8	Alappuzha (5), Ernakulam (3), Kannur (4), Kasargod (8), Kollam (5), Kottayam (3), Kozhikode (13), Malappuram (14), Palakkad (1), Pathanamthitta (3), Thiruvananthapuram (3), Thrissur (27), Wayanad (2)	Kuwait	15	2,005	T	
June-8	Alappuzha (5), Ernakulam (3), Kannur (4), Kasargod (8), Kollam (5), Kottayam (3), Kozhikode (13), Malappuram (14), Palakkad (1), Pathanamthitta (3), Thiruvananthapuram (3), Thrissur (27), Wayanad (2)	Maharashtra	6	2,005	T	
June-8	Alappuzha (5), Ernakulam (3), Kannur (4), Kasargod (8), Kollam (5), Kottayam (3), Kozhikode (13), Malappuram (14), Palakkad (1), Pathanamthitta (3), Thiruvananthapuram (3), Thrissur (27), Wayanad (2)	Tamil Nadu	6	2,005	T	
June-8	Alappuzha (5), Ernakulam (3), Kannur (4), Kasargod (8), Kollam (5), Kottayam (3), Kozhikode (13), Malappuram (14), Palakkad (1), Pathanamthitta (3), Thiruvananthapuram (3), Thrissur (27), Wayanad (2)	Oman	5	2,005	T	
June-8	Alappuzha (5), Ernakulam (3), Kannur (4), Kasargod (8), Kollam (5), Kottayam (3), Kozhikode (13), Malappuram (14), Palakkad (1), Pathanamthitta (3), Thiruvananthapuram (3), Thrissur (27), Wayanad (2)	Russia	4	2,005	T	
June-8	Alappuzha (5), Ernakulam (3), Kannur (4), Kasargod (8), Kollam (5), Kottayam (3), Kozhikode (13), Malappuram (14), Palakkad (1), Pathanamthitta (3), Thiruvananthapuram (3), Thrissur (27), Wayanad (2)	Nigeria	3	2,005	T	
June-8	Alappuzha (5), Ernakulam (3), Kannur (4), Kasargod (8), Kollam (5), Kottayam (3), Kozhikode (13), Malappuram (14), Palakkad (1), Pathanamthitta (3), Thiruvananthapuram (3), Thrissur (27), Wayanad (2)	None	3	2,005	PTP	
June-8	Alappuzha (5), Ernakulam (3), Kannur (4), Kasargod (8), Kollam (5), Kottayam (3), Kozhikode (13), Malappuram (14), Palakkad (1), Pathanamthitta (3), Thiruvananthapuram (3), Thrissur (27), Wayanad (2)	Delhi	2	2,005	T	
June-8	Alappuzha (5), Ernakulam (3), Kannur (4), Kasargod (8), Kollam (5), Kottayam (3), Kozhikode (13), Malappuram (14), Palakkad (1), Pathanamthitta (3), Thiruvananthapuram (3), Thrissur (27), Wayanad (2)	Saudi Arabia	2	2,005	T	
June-8	Alappuzha (5), Ernakulam (3), Kannur (4), Kasargod (8), Kollam (5), Kottayam (3), Kozhikode (13), Malappuram (14), Palakkad (1), Pathanamthitta (3), Thiruvananthapuram (3), Thrissur (27), Wayanad (2)	Karnataka	1	2,005	T	
June-8	Alappuzha (5), Ernakulam (3), Kannur (4), Kasargod (8), Kollam (5), Kottayam (3), Kozhikode (13), Malappuram (14), Palakkad (1), Pathanamthitta (3), Thiruvananthapuram (3), Thrissur (27), Wayanad (2)	Italy	1	2,005	T	
June-8	Alappuzha (5), Ernakulam (3), Kannur (4), Kasargod (8), Kollam (5), Kottayam (3), Kozhikode (13), Malappuram (14), Palakkad (1), Pathanamthitta (3), Thiruvananthapuram (3), Thrissur (27), Wayanad (2)	Jordan	1	2,005	T	
June-9	Alappuzha (11), Ernakulam (4), Kannur (5), Kasargod (2), Kollam (5), Kottayam (8), Kozhikode (7), Malappuram (6), Palakkad (14), Pathanamthitta (7), Thiruvananthapuram (10), Thrissur (6), Wayanad (6)	UAE	30	2,096	T	
June-9	Alappuzha (11), Ernakulam (4), Kannur (5), Kasargod (2), Kollam (5), Kottayam (8), Kozhikode (7), Malappuram (6), Palakkad (14), Pathanamthitta (7), Thiruvananthapuram (10), Thrissur (6), Wayanad (6)	Maharashtra	14	2,096	T	
June-9	Alappuzha (11), Ernakulam (4), Kannur (5), Kasargod (2), Kollam (5), Kottayam (8), Kozhikode (7), Malappuram (6), Palakkad (14), Pathanamthitta (7), Thiruvananthapuram (10), Thrissur (6), Wayanad (6)	Kuwait	10	2,096	T	
June-9	Alappuzha (11), Ernakulam (4), Kannur (5), Kasargod (2), Kollam (5), Kottayam (8), Kozhikode (7), Malappuram (6), Palakkad (14), Pathanamthitta (7), Thiruvananthapuram (10), Thrissur (6), Wayanad (6)	None	10	2,096	PTP	
June-9	Alappuzha (11), Ernakulam (4), Kannur (5), Kasargod (2), Kollam (5), Kottayam (8), Kozhikode (7), Malappuram (6), Palakkad (14), Pathanamthitta (7), Thiruvananthapuram (10), Thrissur (6), Wayanad (6)	Delhi	5	2,096	T	
June-9	Alappuzha (11), Ernakulam (4), Kannur (5), Kasargod (2), Kollam (5), Kottayam (8), Kozhikode (7), Malappuram (6), Palakkad (14), Pathanamthitta (7), Thiruvananthapuram (10), Thrissur (6), Wayanad (6)	Tamil Nadu	5	2,096	T	
June-9	Alappuzha (11), Ernakulam (4), Kannur (5), Kasargod (2), Kollam (5), Kottayam (8), Kozhikode (7), Malappuram (6), Palakkad (14), Pathanamthitta (7), Thiruvananthapuram (10), Thrissur (6), Wayanad (6)	Nigeria	4	2,096	T	
June-9	Alappuzha (11), Ernakulam (4), Kannur (5), Kasargod (2), Kollam (5), Kottayam (8), Kozhikode (7), Malappuram (6), Palakkad (14), Pathanamthitta (7), Thiruvananthapuram (10), Thrissur (6), Wayanad (6)	Tajikistan	4	2,096	T	
June-9	Alappuzha (11), Ernakulam (4), Kannur (5), Kasargod (2), Kollam (5), Kottayam (8), Kozhikode (7), Malappuram (6), Palakkad (14), Pathanamthitta (7), Thiruvananthapuram (10), Thrissur (6), Wayanad (6)	Russia	3	2,096	T	
June-9	Alappuzha (11), Ernakulam (4), Kannur (5), Kasargod (2), Kollam (5), Kottayam (8), Kozhikode (7), Malappuram (6), Palakkad (14), Pathanamthitta (7), Thiruvananthapuram (10), Thrissur (6), Wayanad (6)	Karnataka	2	2,096	T	
June-9	Alappuzha (11), Ernakulam (4), Kannur (5), Kasargod (2), Kollam (5), Kottayam (8), Kozhikode (7), Malappuram (6), Palakkad (14), Pathanamthitta (7), Thiruvananthapuram (10), Thrissur (6), Wayanad (6)	Saudi Arabia	2	2,096	T	
June-9	Alappuzha (11), Ernakulam (4), Kannur (5), Kasargod (2), Kollam (5), Kottayam (8), Kozhikode (7), Malappuram (6), Palakkad (14), Pathanamthitta (7), Thiruvananthapuram (10), Thrissur (6), Wayanad (6)	Andhra Pradesh	1	2,096	T	
June-10	Alappuzha (1), Ernakulam (4), Idukki (4), Kannur (4), Kollam (4), Kottayam (3), Kozhikode (10), Malappuram (7), Palakkad (6), Pathanamthitta (3), Thiruvananthapuram (6), Thrissur (9), Wayanad (4)	UAE	22	2,161	T	
June-10	Alappuzha (1), Ernakulam (4), Idukki (4), Kannur (4), Kollam (4), Kottayam (3), Kozhikode (10), Malappuram (7), Palakkad (6), Pathanamthitta (3), Thiruvananthapuram (6), Thrissur (9), Wayanad (4)	Maharashtra	9	2,161	T	
June-10	Alappuzha (1), Ernakulam (4), Idukki (4), Kannur (4), Kollam (4), Kottayam (3), Kozhikode (10), Malappuram (7), Palakkad (6), Pathanamthitta (3), Thiruvananthapuram (6), Thrissur (9), Wayanad (4)	Tamil Nadu	9	2,161	T	
June-10	Alappuzha (1), Ernakulam (4), Idukki (4), Kannur (4), Kollam (4), Kottayam (3), Kozhikode (10), Malappuram (7), Palakkad (6), Pathanamthitta (3), Thiruvananthapuram (6), Thrissur (9), Wayanad (4)	None	5	2,161	PTP	
June-10	Alappuzha (1), Ernakulam (4), Idukki (4), Kannur (4), Kollam (4), Kottayam (3), Kozhikode (10), Malappuram (7), Palakkad (6), Pathanamthitta (3), Thiruvananthapuram (6), Thrissur (9), Wayanad (4)	Kuwait	4	2,161	T	
June-10	Alappuzha (1), Ernakulam (4), Idukki (4), Kannur (4), Kollam (4), Kottayam (3), Kozhikode (10), Malappuram (7), Palakkad (6), Pathanamthitta (3), Thiruvananthapuram (6), Thrissur (9), Wayanad (4)	Delhi	3	2,161	T	
June-10	Alappuzha (1), Ernakulam (4), Idukki (4), Kannur (4), Kollam (4), Kottayam (3), Kozhikode (10), Malappuram (7), Palakkad (6), Pathanamthitta (3), Thiruvananthapuram (6), Thrissur (9), Wayanad (4)	Oman	3	2,161	T	
June-10	Alappuzha (1), Ernakulam (4), Idukki (4), Kannur (4), Kollam (4), Kottayam (3), Kozhikode (10), Malappuram (7), Palakkad (6), Pathanamthitta (3), Thiruvananthapuram (6), Thrissur (9), Wayanad (4)	Nigeria	2	2,161	T	
June-10	Alappuzha (1), Ernakulam (4), Idukki (4), Kannur (4), Kollam (4), Kottayam (3), Kozhikode (10), Malappuram (7), Palakkad (6), Pathanamthitta (3), Thiruvananthapuram (6), Thrissur (9), Wayanad (4)	Russia	2	2,161	T	
June-10	Alappuzha (1), Ernakulam (4), Idukki (4), Kannur (4), Kollam (4), Kottayam (3), Kozhikode (10), Malappuram (7), Palakkad (6), Pathanamthitta (3), Thiruvananthapuram (6), Thrissur (9), Wayanad (4)	Arunachal Pradesh	1	2,161	T	
June-10	Alappuzha (1), Ernakulam (4), Idukki (4), Kannur (4), Kollam (4), Kottayam (3), Kozhikode (10), Malappuram (7), Palakkad (6), Pathanamthitta (3), Thiruvananthapuram (6), Thrissur (9), Wayanad (4)	Gujarat	1	2,161	T	
June-10	Alappuzha (1), Ernakulam (4), Idukki (4), Kannur (4), Kollam (4), Kottayam (3), Kozhikode (10), Malappuram (7), Palakkad (6), Pathanamthitta (3), Thiruvananthapuram (6), Thrissur (9), Wayanad (4)	Karnataka	1	2,161	T	
June-10	Alappuzha (1), Ernakulam (4), Idukki (4), Kannur (4), Kollam (4), Kottayam (3), Kozhikode (10), Malappuram (7), Palakkad (6), Pathanamthitta (3), Thiruvananthapuram (6), Thrissur (9), Wayanad (4)	Saudi Arabia	1	2,161	T	
June-10	Alappuzha (1), Ernakulam (4), Idukki (4), Kannur (4), Kollam (4), Kottayam (3), Kozhikode (10), Malappuram (7), Palakkad (6), Pathanamthitta (3), Thiruvananthapuram (6), Thrissur (9), Wayanad (4)	Uttar Pradesh	1	2,161	T	
June-11	Ernakulam (2), Idukki (4), Kannur (7), Kasargod (10), Kollam (8), Kottayam (2), Kozhikode (1), Malappuram (10), Palakkad (13), Pathanamthitta (5), Thrissur (25)	Overseas	27	2,244	T	
June-11	Ernakulam (2), Idukki (4), Kannur (7), Kasargod (10), Kollam (8), Kottayam (2), Kozhikode (1), Malappuram (10), Palakkad (13), Pathanamthitta (5), Thrissur (25)	Maharashtra	20	2,244	T	
June-11	Ernakulam (2), Idukki (4), Kannur (7), Kasargod (10), Kollam (8), Kottayam (2), Kozhikode (1), Malappuram (10), Palakkad (13), Pathanamthitta (5), Thrissur (25)	None	19	2,244	PTP	
June-11	Ernakulam (2), Idukki (4), Kannur (7), Kasargod (10), Kollam (8), Kottayam (2), Kozhikode (1), Malappuram (10), Palakkad (13), Pathanamthitta (5), Thrissur (25)	Delhi	7	2,244	T	
June-11	Ernakulam (2), Idukki (4), Kannur (7), Kasargod (10), Kollam (8), Kottayam (2), Kozhikode (1), Malappuram (10), Palakkad (13), Pathanamthitta (5), Thrissur (25)	Karnataka	4	2,244	T	
June-11	Ernakulam (2), Idukki (4), Kannur (7), Kasargod (10), Kollam (8), Kottayam (2), Kozhikode (1), Malappuram (10), Palakkad (13), Pathanamthitta (5), Thrissur (25)	Tamil Nadu	4	2,244	T	
June-11	Ernakulam (2), Idukki (4), Kannur (7), Kasargod (10), Kollam (8), Kottayam (2), Kozhikode (1), Malappuram (10), Palakkad (13), Pathanamthitta (5), Thrissur (25)	Madhya Pradesh	1	2,244	T	
June-11	Ernakulam (2), Idukki (4), Kannur (7), Kasargod (10), Kollam (8), Kottayam (2), Kozhikode (1), Malappuram (10), Palakkad (13), Pathanamthitta (5), Thrissur (25)	West Bengal	1	2,244	T	
June-12	Alappuzha (13), Ernakulam (5), Idukki (1), Kannur (3), Kasargod (4), Kollam (4), Kottayam (3), Kozhikode (4), Malappuram (14), Palakkad (5), Pathanamthitta (7), Thiruvananthapuram (1), Thrissur (14)	UAE	17	2,244	T	
June-12	Alappuzha (13), Ernakulam (5), Idukki (1), Kannur (3), Kasargod (4), Kollam (4), Kottayam (3), Kozhikode (4), Malappuram (14), Palakkad (5), Pathanamthitta (7), Thiruvananthapuram (1), Thrissur (14)	Maharashtra	16	2,244	T	
June-12	Alappuzha (13), Ernakulam (5), Idukki (1), Kannur (3), Kasargod (4), Kollam (4), Kottayam (3), Kozhikode (4), Malappuram (14), Palakkad (5), Pathanamthitta (7), Thiruvananthapuram (1), Thrissur (14)	Kuwait	12	2,244	T	
June-12	Alappuzha (13), Ernakulam (5), Idukki (1), Kannur (3), Kasargod (4), Kollam (4), Kottayam (3), Kozhikode (4), Malappuram (14), Palakkad (5), Pathanamthitta (7), Thiruvananthapuram (1), Thrissur (14)	None	10	2,244	PTP	
June-12	Alappuzha (13), Ernakulam (5), Idukki (1), Kannur (3), Kasargod (4), Kollam (4), Kottayam (3), Kozhikode (4), Malappuram (14), Palakkad (5), Pathanamthitta (7), Thiruvananthapuram (1), Thrissur (14)	Delhi	7	2,244	T	
June-12	Alappuzha (13), Ernakulam (5), Idukki (1), Kannur (3), Kasargod (4), Kollam (4), Kottayam (3), Kozhikode (4), Malappuram (14), Palakkad (5), Pathanamthitta (7), Thiruvananthapuram (1), Thrissur (14)	Saudi Arabia	4	2,244	T	
June-12	Alappuzha (13), Ernakulam (5), Idukki (1), Kannur (3), Kasargod (4), Kollam (4), Kottayam (3), Kozhikode (4), Malappuram (14), Palakkad (5), Pathanamthitta (7), Thiruvananthapuram (1), Thrissur (14)	Tamil Nadu	3	2,244	T	
June-12	Alappuzha (13), Ernakulam (5), Idukki (1), Kannur (3), Kasargod (4), Kollam (4), Kottayam (3), Kozhikode (4), Malappuram (14), Palakkad (5), Pathanamthitta (7), Thiruvananthapuram (1), Thrissur (14)	Karnataka	2	2,244	T	
June-12	Alappuzha (13), Ernakulam (5), Idukki (1), Kannur (3), Kasargod (4), Kollam (4), Kottayam (3), Kozhikode (4), Malappuram (14), Palakkad (5), Pathanamthitta (7), Thiruvananthapuram (1), Thrissur (14)	Oman	2	2,244	T	
June-12	Alappuzha (13), Ernakulam (5), Idukki (1), Kannur (3), Kasargod (4), Kollam (4), Kottayam (3), Kozhikode (4), Malappuram (14), Palakkad (5), Pathanamthitta (7), Thiruvananthapuram (1), Thrissur (14)	Andhra Pradesh	1	2,244	T	
June-12	Alappuzha (13), Ernakulam (5), Idukki (1), Kannur (3), Kasargod (4), Kollam (4), Kottayam (3), Kozhikode (4), Malappuram (14), Palakkad (5), Pathanamthitta (7), Thiruvananthapuram (1), Thrissur (14)	Maldives	1	2,244	T	
June-13	Alappuzha (9), Ernakulam (7), Idukki (4), Kannur (14), Kasargod (9), Kottayam (1), Kozhikode (12), Malappuram (15), Palakkad (8), Pathanamthitta (1), Thrissur (4), Wayanad (1)	Kuwait	21	2,407	T	
June-13	Alappuzha (9), Ernakulam (7), Idukki (4), Kannur (14), Kasargod (9), Kottayam (1), Kozhikode (12), Malappuram (15), Palakkad (8), Pathanamthitta (1), Thrissur (4), Wayanad (1)	UAE	16	2,407	T	
June-13	Alappuzha (9), Ernakulam (7), Idukki (4), Kannur (14), Kasargod (9), Kottayam (1), Kozhikode (12), Malappuram (15), Palakkad (8), Pathanamthitta (1), Thrissur (4), Wayanad (1)	None	10	2,407	PTP	
June-13	Alappuzha (9), Ernakulam (7), Idukki (4), Kannur (14), Kasargod (9), Kottayam (1), Kozhikode (12), Malappuram (15), Palakkad (8), Pathanamthitta (1), Thrissur (4), Wayanad (1)	Saudi Arabia	7	2,407	T	
June-13	Alappuzha (9), Ernakulam (7), Idukki (4), Kannur (14), Kasargod (9), Kottayam (1), Kozhikode (12), Malappuram (15), Palakkad (8), Pathanamthitta (1), Thrissur (4), Wayanad (1)	Maharashtra	6	2,407	T	
June-13	Alappuzha (9), Ernakulam (7), Idukki (4), Kannur (14), Kasargod (9), Kottayam (1), Kozhikode (12), Malappuram (15), Palakkad (8), Pathanamthitta (1), Thrissur (4), Wayanad (1)	Tamil Nadu	5	2,407	T	
June-13	Alappuzha (9), Ernakulam (7), Idukki (4), Kannur (14), Kasargod (9), Kottayam (1), Kozhikode (12), Malappuram (15), Palakkad (8), Pathanamthitta (1), Thrissur (4), Wayanad (1)	Dehi	4	2,407	T	
June-13	Alappuzha (9), Ernakulam (7), Idukki (4), Kannur (14), Kasargod (9), Kottayam (1), Kozhikode (12), Malappuram (15), Palakkad (8), Pathanamthitta (1), Thrissur (4), Wayanad (1)	Oman	4	2,407	T	
June-13	Alappuzha (9), Ernakulam (7), Idukki (4), Kannur (14), Kasargod (9), Kottayam (1), Kozhikode (12), Malappuram (15), Palakkad (8), Pathanamthitta (1), Thrissur (4), Wayanad (1)	Nigeria	3	2,407	T	
June-13	Alappuzha (9), Ernakulam (7), Idukki (4), Kannur (14), Kasargod (9), Kottayam (1), Kozhikode (12), Malappuram (15), Palakkad (8), Pathanamthitta (1), Thrissur (4), Wayanad (1)	Russia	2	2,407	T	
June-13	Alappuzha (9), Ernakulam (7), Idukki (4), Kannur (14), Kasargod (9), Kottayam (1), Kozhikode (12), Malappuram (15), Palakkad (8), Pathanamthitta (1), Thrissur (4), Wayanad (1)	Rajasthan	1	2,407	T	
June-13	Alappuzha (9), Ernakulam (7), Idukki (4), Kannur (14), Kasargod (9), Kottayam (1), Kozhikode (12), Malappuram (15), Palakkad (8), Pathanamthitta (1), Thrissur (4), Wayanad (1)	West Bengal	1	2,407	T	
June-14	Ernakulam (7), Idukki (2), Kannur (4), Kasargod (6), Kollam (1), Kottayam (2), Kozhikode (8), Malappuram (2), Palakkad (6), Pathanamthitta (2), Thiruvananthapuram (4), Thrissur (7), Wayanad (1)	UAE	13	2,461	T	
June-14	Ernakulam (7), Idukki (2), Kannur (4), Kasargod (6), Kollam (1), Kottayam (2), Kozhikode (8), Malappuram (2), Palakkad (6), Pathanamthitta (2), Thiruvananthapuram (4), Thrissur (7), Wayanad (1)	Maharashtra	13	2,461	T	
June-14	Ernakulam (7), Idukki (2), Kannur (4), Kasargod (6), Kollam (1), Kottayam (2), Kozhikode (8), Malappuram (2), Palakkad (6), Pathanamthitta (2), Thiruvananthapuram (4), Thrissur (7), Wayanad (1)	Tamil Nadu	9	2,461	T	
June-14	Ernakulam (7), Idukki (2), Kannur (4), Kasargod (6), Kollam (1), Kottayam (2), Kozhikode (8), Malappuram (2), Palakkad (6), Pathanamthitta (2), Thiruvananthapuram (4), Thrissur (7), Wayanad (1)	None	6	2,461	PTP	
June-14	Ernakulam (7), Idukki (2), Kannur (4), Kasargod (6), Kollam (1), Kottayam (2), Kozhikode (8), Malappuram (2), Palakkad (6), Pathanamthitta (2), Thiruvananthapuram (4), Thrissur (7), Wayanad (1)	Saudi Arabia	5	2,461	T	
June-14	Ernakulam (7), Idukki (2), Kannur (4), Kasargod (6), Kollam (1), Kottayam (2), Kozhikode (8), Malappuram (2), Palakkad (6), Pathanamthitta (2), Thiruvananthapuram (4), Thrissur (7), Wayanad (1)	Nigeria	3	2,461	T	
June-14	Ernakulam (7), Idukki (2), Kannur (4), Kasargod (6), Kollam (1), Kottayam (2), Kozhikode (8), Malappuram (2), Palakkad (6), Pathanamthitta (2), Thiruvananthapuram (4), Thrissur (7), Wayanad (1)	Kuwait	2	2,461	T	
June-14	Ernakulam (7), Idukki (2), Kannur (4), Kasargod (6), Kollam (1), Kottayam (2), Kozhikode (8), Malappuram (2), Palakkad (6), Pathanamthitta (2), Thiruvananthapuram (4), Thrissur (7), Wayanad (1)	Delhi	1	2,461	T	
June-14	Ernakulam (7), Idukki (2), Kannur (4), Kasargod (6), Kollam (1), Kottayam (2), Kozhikode (8), Malappuram (2), Palakkad (6), Pathanamthitta (2), Thiruvananthapuram (4), Thrissur (7), Wayanad (1)	Haryana	1	2,461	T	
June-14	Ernakulam (7), Idukki (2), Kannur (4), Kasargod (6), Kollam (1), Kottayam (2), Kozhikode (8), Malappuram (2), Palakkad (6), Pathanamthitta (2), Thiruvananthapuram (4), Thrissur (7), Wayanad (1)	Karnataka	1	2,461	T	
June-15	Alappuzha (5), Ernakulam (13), Idukki (2), Kannur (10), Kasargod (3), Kollam (4), Kottayam (10), Kozhikode (6), Malappuram (6), Palakkad (7), Pathanamthitta (11), Thiruvananthapuram (1), Thrissur (3), Wayanad (1)	UAE	19	2,543	T	
June-15	Alappuzha (5), Ernakulam (13), Idukki (2), Kannur (10), Kasargod (3), Kollam (4), Kottayam (10), Kozhikode (6), Malappuram (6), Palakkad (7), Pathanamthitta (11), Thiruvananthapuram (1), Thrissur (3), Wayanad (1)	Maharashtra	13	2,543	T	
June-15	Alappuzha (5), Ernakulam (13), Idukki (2), Kannur (10), Kasargod (3), Kollam (4), Kottayam (10), Kozhikode (6), Malappuram (6), Palakkad (7), Pathanamthitta (11), Thiruvananthapuram (1), Thrissur (3), Wayanad (1)	Kuwait	12	2,543	T	
June-15	Alappuzha (5), Ernakulam (13), Idukki (2), Kannur (10), Kasargod (3), Kollam (4), Kottayam (10), Kozhikode (6), Malappuram (6), Palakkad (7), Pathanamthitta (11), Thiruvananthapuram (1), Thrissur (3), Wayanad (1)	None	9	2,543	PTP	
June-15	Alappuzha (5), Ernakulam (13), Idukki (2), Kannur (10), Kasargod (3), Kollam (4), Kottayam (10), Kozhikode (6), Malappuram (6), Palakkad (7), Pathanamthitta (11), Thiruvananthapuram (1), Thrissur (3), Wayanad (1)	Saudi Arabia	9	2,543	T	
June-15	Alappuzha (5), Ernakulam (13), Idukki (2), Kannur (10), Kasargod (3), Kollam (4), Kottayam (10), Kozhikode (6), Malappuram (6), Palakkad (7), Pathanamthitta (11), Thiruvananthapuram (1), Thrissur (3), Wayanad (1)	Qatar	5	2,543	T	
June-15	Alappuzha (5), Ernakulam (13), Idukki (2), Kannur (10), Kasargod (3), Kollam (4), Kottayam (10), Kozhikode (6), Malappuram (6), Palakkad (7), Pathanamthitta (11), Thiruvananthapuram (1), Thrissur (3), Wayanad (1)	Tamil Nadu	4	2,543	T	
June-15	Alappuzha (5), Ernakulam (13), Idukki (2), Kannur (10), Kasargod (3), Kollam (4), Kottayam (10), Kozhikode (6), Malappuram (6), Palakkad (7), Pathanamthitta (11), Thiruvananthapuram (1), Thrissur (3), Wayanad (1)	Delhi	3	2,543	T	
June-15	Alappuzha (5), Ernakulam (13), Idukki (2), Kannur (10), Kasargod (3), Kollam (4), Kottayam (10), Kozhikode (6), Malappuram (6), Palakkad (7), Pathanamthitta (11), Thiruvananthapuram (1), Thrissur (3), Wayanad (1)	Nigeria	2	2,543	T	
June-15	Alappuzha (5), Ernakulam (13), Idukki (2), Kannur (10), Kasargod (3), Kollam (4), Kottayam (10), Kozhikode (6), Malappuram (6), Palakkad (7), Pathanamthitta (11), Thiruvananthapuram (1), Thrissur (3), Wayanad (1)	Oman	2	2,543	T	
June-15	Alappuzha (5), Ernakulam (13), Idukki (2), Kannur (10), Kasargod (3), Kollam (4), Kottayam (10), Kozhikode (6), Malappuram (6), Palakkad (7), Pathanamthitta (11), Thiruvananthapuram (1), Thrissur (3), Wayanad (1)	Rajasthan	1	2,543	T	
June-15	Alappuzha (5), Ernakulam (13), Idukki (2), Kannur (10), Kasargod (3), Kollam (4), Kottayam (10), Kozhikode (6), Malappuram (6), Palakkad (7), Pathanamthitta (11), Thiruvananthapuram (1), Thrissur (3), Wayanad (1)	Telangana	1	2,543	T	
June-15	Alappuzha (5), Ernakulam (13), Idukki (2), Kannur (10), Kasargod (3), Kollam (4), Kottayam (10), Kozhikode (6), Malappuram (6), Palakkad (7), Pathanamthitta (11), Thiruvananthapuram (1), Thrissur (3), Wayanad (1)	West Bengal	1	2,543	T	
June-16	Alappuzha (7), Ernakulam (13), Kannur (7), Kasargod (2), Kollam (4), Kottayam (4), Kozhikode (6), Malappuram (15), Palakkad (6), Pathanamthitta (6), Thiruvananthapuram (4), Thrissur (7)	Kuwait	23	2,622	T	
June-16	Alappuzha (7), Ernakulam (13), Kannur (7), Kasargod (2), Kollam (4), Kottayam (4), Kozhikode (6), Malappuram (15), Palakkad (6), Pathanamthitta (6), Thiruvananthapuram (4), Thrissur (7)	Maharashtra	13	2,622	T	
June-16	Alappuzha (7), Ernakulam (13), Kannur (7), Kasargod (2), Kollam (4), Kottayam (4), Kozhikode (6), Malappuram (15), Palakkad (6), Pathanamthitta (6), Thiruvananthapuram (4), Thrissur (7)	UAE	12	2,622	T	
June-16	Alappuzha (7), Ernakulam (13), Kannur (7), Kasargod (2), Kollam (4), Kottayam (4), Kozhikode (6), Malappuram (15), Palakkad (6), Pathanamthitta (6), Thiruvananthapuram (4), Thrissur (7)	None	6	2,622	PTP	
June-16	Alappuzha (7), Ernakulam (13), Kannur (7), Kasargod (2), Kollam (4), Kottayam (4), Kozhikode (6), Malappuram (15), Palakkad (6), Pathanamthitta (6), Thiruvananthapuram (4), Thrissur (7)	Qatar	5	2,622	T	
June-16	Alappuzha (7), Ernakulam (13), Kannur (7), Kasargod (2), Kollam (4), Kottayam (4), Kozhikode (6), Malappuram (15), Palakkad (6), Pathanamthitta (6), Thiruvananthapuram (4), Thrissur (7)	Tamil Nadu	4	2,622	T	
June-16	Alappuzha (7), Ernakulam (13), Kannur (7), Kasargod (2), Kollam (4), Kottayam (4), Kozhikode (6), Malappuram (15), Palakkad (6), Pathanamthitta (6), Thiruvananthapuram (4), Thrissur (7)	Delhi	3	2,622	T	
June-16	Alappuzha (7), Ernakulam (13), Kannur (7), Kasargod (2), Kollam (4), Kottayam (4), Kozhikode (6), Malappuram (15), Palakkad (6), Pathanamthitta (6), Thiruvananthapuram (4), Thrissur (7)	Oman	3	2,622	T	
June-16	Alappuzha (7), Ernakulam (13), Kannur (7), Kasargod (2), Kollam (4), Kottayam (4), Kozhikode (6), Malappuram (15), Palakkad (6), Pathanamthitta (6), Thiruvananthapuram (4), Thrissur (7)	Saudi Arabia	2	2,622	T	
June-16	Alappuzha (7), Ernakulam (13), Kannur (7), Kasargod (2), Kollam (4), Kottayam (4), Kozhikode (6), Malappuram (15), Palakkad (6), Pathanamthitta (6), Thiruvananthapuram (4), Thrissur (7)	West Bengal	2	2,622	T	
June-16	Alappuzha (7), Ernakulam (13), Kannur (7), Kasargod (2), Kollam (4), Kottayam (4), Kozhikode (6), Malappuram (15), Palakkad (6), Pathanamthitta (6), Thiruvananthapuram (4), Thrissur (7)	Bahrain	1	2,622	T	
June-16	Alappuzha (7), Ernakulam (13), Kannur (7), Kasargod (2), Kollam (4), Kottayam (4), Kozhikode (6), Malappuram (15), Palakkad (6), Pathanamthitta (6), Thiruvananthapuram (4), Thrissur (7)	Gujarat	1	2,622	T	
June-16	Alappuzha (7), Ernakulam (13), Kannur (7), Kasargod (2), Kollam (4), Kottayam (4), Kozhikode (6), Malappuram (15), Palakkad (6), Pathanamthitta (6), Thiruvananthapuram (4), Thrissur (7)	Karnataka	1	2,622	T	
June-16	Alappuzha (7), Ernakulam (13), Kannur (7), Kasargod (2), Kollam (4), Kottayam (4), Kozhikode (6), Malappuram (15), Palakkad (6), Pathanamthitta (6), Thiruvananthapuram (4), Thrissur (7)	Odisha	1	2,622	T	
June-16	Alappuzha (7), Ernakulam (13), Kannur (7), Kasargod (2), Kollam (4), Kottayam (4), Kozhikode (6), Malappuram (15), Palakkad (6), Pathanamthitta (6), Thiruvananthapuram (4), Thrissur (7)	Tajikistan	1	2,622	T	
June-17	Alappuzha (1), Ernakulam (5), Kannur (4), Kasargod (9), Kollam (14), Kottayam (4), Kozhikode (6), Malappuram (11), Palakkad (6), Pathanamthitta (1), Thiruvananthapuram (3), Thrissur (8), Wayanad (3)	Overseas	53	2,697	T	
June-17	Alappuzha (1), Ernakulam (5), Kannur (4), Kasargod (9), Kollam (14), Kottayam (4), Kozhikode (6), Malappuram (11), Palakkad (6), Pathanamthitta (1), Thiruvananthapuram (3), Thrissur (8), Wayanad (3)	Maharashtra	8	2,697	T	
June-17	Alappuzha (1), Ernakulam (5), Kannur (4), Kasargod (9), Kollam (14), Kottayam (4), Kozhikode (6), Malappuram (11), Palakkad (6), Pathanamthitta (1), Thiruvananthapuram (3), Thrissur (8), Wayanad (3)	Tamil Nadu	4	2,697	T	
June-17	Alappuzha (1), Ernakulam (5), Kannur (4), Kasargod (9), Kollam (14), Kottayam (4), Kozhikode (6), Malappuram (11), Palakkad (6), Pathanamthitta (1), Thiruvananthapuram (3), Thrissur (8), Wayanad (3)	None	3	2,697	PTP	
June-17	Alappuzha (1), Ernakulam (5), Kannur (4), Kasargod (9), Kollam (14), Kottayam (4), Kozhikode (6), Malappuram (11), Palakkad (6), Pathanamthitta (1), Thiruvananthapuram (3), Thrissur (8), Wayanad (3)	Delhi	5	2,697	T	
June-17	Alappuzha (1), Ernakulam (5), Kannur (4), Kasargod (9), Kollam (14), Kottayam (4), Kozhikode (6), Malappuram (11), Palakkad (6), Pathanamthitta (1), Thiruvananthapuram (3), Thrissur (8), Wayanad (3)	Andhra Pradesh	1	2,697	T	
June-17	Alappuzha (1), Ernakulam (5), Kannur (4), Kasargod (9), Kollam (14), Kottayam (4), Kozhikode (6), Malappuram (11), Palakkad (6), Pathanamthitta (1), Thiruvananthapuram (3), Thrissur (8), Wayanad (3)	Gujarat	1	2,697	T	
June-18	Alappuzha (9), Ernakulam (6), Idukki (6), Kannur (4), Kollam (13), Kottayam (11), Kozhikode (5), Malappuram (4), Palakkad (14), Pathanamthitta (11), Thiruvananthapuram (5), Thrissur (6)	Overseas	65	2,794	T	
June-18	Alappuzha (9), Ernakulam (6), Idukki (6), Kannur (4), Kollam (13), Kottayam (11), Kozhikode (5), Malappuram (4), Palakkad (14), Pathanamthitta (11), Thiruvananthapuram (5), Thrissur (6)	Other states	29	2,794	T	
June-18	Alappuzha (9), Ernakulam (6), Idukki (6), Kannur (4), Kollam (13), Kottayam (11), Kozhikode (5), Malappuram (4), Palakkad (14), Pathanamthitta (11), Thiruvananthapuram (5), Thrissur (6)	None	3	2,794	PTP	
June-19	Alappuzha (13), Ernakulam (11), Idukki (2), Kannur (8), Kasargod (4), Kollam (17), Kottayam (7), Kozhikode (6), Malappuram (18), Palakkad (10), Pathanamthitta (9), Thiruvananthapuram (8), Thrissur (1), Wayanad (4)	Overseas	67	2,794	T	
June-19	Alappuzha (13), Ernakulam (11), Idukki (2), Kannur (8), Kasargod (4), Kollam (17), Kottayam (7), Kozhikode (6), Malappuram (18), Palakkad (10), Pathanamthitta (9), Thiruvananthapuram (8), Thrissur (1), Wayanad (4)	Other states	45	2,794	T	
June-19	Alappuzha (13), Ernakulam (11), Idukki (2), Kannur (8), Kasargod (4), Kollam (17), Kottayam (7), Kozhikode (6), Malappuram (18), Palakkad (10), Pathanamthitta (9), Thiruvananthapuram (8), Thrissur (1), Wayanad (4)	None	6	2,794	PTP	
June-20	Alappuzha (4), Ernakulam (3), Idukki (1), Kannur (4), Kasargod (7), Kollam (24), Kottayam (11), Kozhikode (12), Malappuram (5), Palakkad (23), Pathanamthitta (17), Thiruvananthapuram (5), Thrissur (6), Wayanad (5)	Overseas	87	3,039	T	
June-20	Alappuzha (4), Ernakulam (3), Idukki (1), Kannur (4), Kasargod (7), Kollam (24), Kottayam (11), Kozhikode (12), Malappuram (5), Palakkad (23), Pathanamthitta (17), Thiruvananthapuram (5), Thrissur (6), Wayanad (5)	Other states	36	3,039	T	
June-20	Alappuzha (4), Ernakulam (3), Idukki (1), Kannur (4), Kasargod (7), Kollam (24), Kottayam (11), Kozhikode (12), Malappuram (5), Palakkad (23), Pathanamthitta (17), Thiruvananthapuram (5), Thrissur (6), Wayanad (5)	None	3	3,039	PTP	
June-21	Alappuzha (10), Ernakulam (5), Idukki (11), Kannur (10), Kasargod (6), Kollam (13), Kottayam (10), Kozhikode (10), Malappuram (10), Palakkad (15), Pathanamthitta (8), Thiruvananthapuram (9), Thrissur (16)	Kuwait	35	3,172	T	
June-21	Alappuzha (10), Ernakulam (5), Idukki (11), Kannur (10), Kasargod (6), Kollam (13), Kottayam (10), Kozhikode (10), Malappuram (10), Palakkad (15), Pathanamthitta (8), Thiruvananthapuram (9), Thrissur (16)	Saudi Arabia	18	3,172	T	
June-21	Alappuzha (10), Ernakulam (5), Idukki (11), Kannur (10), Kasargod (6), Kollam (13), Kottayam (10), Kozhikode (10), Malappuram (10), Palakkad (15), Pathanamthitta (8), Thiruvananthapuram (9), Thrissur (16)	Tamil Nadu	17	3,172	T	
June-21	Alappuzha (10), Ernakulam (5), Idukki (11), Kannur (10), Kasargod (6), Kollam (13), Kottayam (10), Kozhikode (10), Malappuram (10), Palakkad (15), Pathanamthitta (8), Thiruvananthapuram (9), Thrissur (16)	Maharashtra	16	3,172	T	
June-21	Alappuzha (10), Ernakulam (5), Idukki (11), Kannur (10), Kasargod (6), Kollam (13), Kottayam (10), Kozhikode (10), Malappuram (10), Palakkad (15), Pathanamthitta (8), Thiruvananthapuram (9), Thrissur (16)	UAE	13	3,172	T	
June-21	Alappuzha (10), Ernakulam (5), Idukki (11), Kannur (10), Kasargod (6), Kollam (13), Kottayam (10), Kozhikode (10), Malappuram (10), Palakkad (15), Pathanamthitta (8), Thiruvananthapuram (9), Thrissur (16)	None	10	3,172	PTP	
June-21	Alappuzha (10), Ernakulam (5), Idukki (11), Kannur (10), Kasargod (6), Kollam (13), Kottayam (10), Kozhikode (10), Malappuram (10), Palakkad (15), Pathanamthitta (8), Thiruvananthapuram (9), Thrissur (16)	Bahrain	5	3,172	T	
June-21	Alappuzha (10), Ernakulam (5), Idukki (11), Kannur (10), Kasargod (6), Kollam (13), Kottayam (10), Kozhikode (10), Malappuram (10), Palakkad (15), Pathanamthitta (8), Thiruvananthapuram (9), Thrissur (16)	Oman	5	3,172	T	
June-21	Alappuzha (10), Ernakulam (5), Idukki (11), Kannur (10), Kasargod (6), Kollam (13), Kottayam (10), Kozhikode (10), Malappuram (10), Palakkad (15), Pathanamthitta (8), Thiruvananthapuram (9), Thrissur (16)	Delhi	3	3,172	T	
June-21	Alappuzha (10), Ernakulam (5), Idukki (11), Kannur (10), Kasargod (6), Kollam (13), Kottayam (10), Kozhikode (10), Malappuram (10), Palakkad (15), Pathanamthitta (8), Thiruvananthapuram (9), Thrissur (16)	Gujarat	2	3,172	T	
June-21	Alappuzha (10), Ernakulam (5), Idukki (11), Kannur (10), Kasargod (6), Kollam (13), Kottayam (10), Kozhikode (10), Malappuram (10), Palakkad (15), Pathanamthitta (8), Thiruvananthapuram (9), Thrissur (16)	Uttar Pradesh	2	3,172	T	
June-21	Alappuzha (10), Ernakulam (5), Idukki (11), Kannur (10), Kasargod (6), Kollam (13), Kottayam (10), Kozhikode (10), Malappuram (10), Palakkad (15), Pathanamthitta (8), Thiruvananthapuram (9), Thrissur (16)	Qatar	2	3,172	T	
June-21	Alappuzha (10), Ernakulam (5), Idukki (11), Kannur (10), Kasargod (6), Kollam (13), Kottayam (10), Kozhikode (10), Malappuram (10), Palakkad (15), Pathanamthitta (8), Thiruvananthapuram (9), Thrissur (16)	West Bengal	2	3,172	T	
June-21	Alappuzha (10), Ernakulam (5), Idukki (11), Kannur (10), Kasargod (6), Kollam (13), Kottayam (10), Kozhikode (10), Malappuram (10), Palakkad (15), Pathanamthitta (8), Thiruvananthapuram (9), Thrissur (16)	Djibouti	1	3,172	T	
June-21	Alappuzha (10), Ernakulam (5), Idukki (11), Kannur (10), Kasargod (6), Kollam (13), Kottayam (10), Kozhikode (10), Malappuram (10), Palakkad (15), Pathanamthitta (8), Thiruvananthapuram (9), Thrissur (16)	Egypt	1	3,172	T	
June-21	Alappuzha (10), Ernakulam (5), Idukki (11), Kannur (10), Kasargod (6), Kollam (13), Kottayam (10), Kozhikode (10), Malappuram (10), Palakkad (15), Pathanamthitta (8), Thiruvananthapuram (9), Thrissur (16)	Haryana	1	3,172	T	
June-22	Alappuzha (12), Ernakulam (14), Idukki (4), Kannur (3), Kasargod (9), Kollam (13), Kottayam (13), Kozhikode (5), Malappuram (17), Palakkad (16), Pathanamthitta (4), Thiruvananthapuram (11), Thrissur (12), Wayanad (5)	Kuwait	43	3,310	T	
June-22	Alappuzha (12), Ernakulam (14), Idukki (4), Kannur (3), Kasargod (9), Kollam (13), Kottayam (13), Kozhikode (5), Malappuram (17), Palakkad (16), Pathanamthitta (4), Thiruvananthapuram (11), Thrissur (12), Wayanad (5)	Maharashtra	18	3,310	T	
June-22	Alappuzha (12), Ernakulam (14), Idukki (4), Kannur (3), Kasargod (9), Kollam (13), Kottayam (13), Kozhikode (5), Malappuram (17), Palakkad (16), Pathanamthitta (4), Thiruvananthapuram (11), Thrissur (12), Wayanad (5)	Qatar	14	3,310	T	
June-22	Alappuzha (12), Ernakulam (14), Idukki (4), Kannur (3), Kasargod (9), Kollam (13), Kottayam (13), Kozhikode (5), Malappuram (17), Palakkad (16), Pathanamthitta (4), Thiruvananthapuram (11), Thrissur (12), Wayanad (5)	UAE	14	3,310	T	
June-22	Alappuzha (12), Ernakulam (14), Idukki (4), Kannur (3), Kasargod (9), Kollam (13), Kottayam (13), Kozhikode (5), Malappuram (17), Palakkad (16), Pathanamthitta (4), Thiruvananthapuram (11), Thrissur (12), Wayanad (5)	Tamil Nadu	12	3,310	T	
June-22	Alappuzha (12), Ernakulam (14), Idukki (4), Kannur (3), Kasargod (9), Kollam (13), Kottayam (13), Kozhikode (5), Malappuram (17), Palakkad (16), Pathanamthitta (4), Thiruvananthapuram (11), Thrissur (12), Wayanad (5)	Delhi	10	3,310	T	
June-22	Alappuzha (12), Ernakulam (14), Idukki (4), Kannur (3), Kasargod (9), Kollam (13), Kottayam (13), Kozhikode (5), Malappuram (17), Palakkad (16), Pathanamthitta (4), Thiruvananthapuram (11), Thrissur (12), Wayanad (5)	Saudi Arabia	9	3,310	T	
June-22	Alappuzha (12), Ernakulam (14), Idukki (4), Kannur (3), Kasargod (9), Kollam (13), Kottayam (13), Kozhikode (5), Malappuram (17), Palakkad (16), Pathanamthitta (4), Thiruvananthapuram (11), Thrissur (12), Wayanad (5)	None	4	3,310	PTP	
June-22	Alappuzha (12), Ernakulam (14), Idukki (4), Kannur (3), Kasargod (9), Kollam (13), Kottayam (13), Kozhikode (5), Malappuram (17), Palakkad (16), Pathanamthitta (4), Thiruvananthapuram (11), Thrissur (12), Wayanad (5)	Oman	4	3,310	T	
June-22	Alappuzha (12), Ernakulam (14), Idukki (4), Kannur (3), Kasargod (9), Kollam (13), Kottayam (13), Kozhikode (5), Malappuram (17), Palakkad (16), Pathanamthitta (4), Thiruvananthapuram (11), Thrissur (12), Wayanad (5)	Uttar Pradesh	2	3,310	T	
June-22	Alappuzha (12), Ernakulam (14), Idukki (4), Kannur (3), Kasargod (9), Kollam (13), Kottayam (13), Kozhikode (5), Malappuram (17), Palakkad (16), Pathanamthitta (4), Thiruvananthapuram (11), Thrissur (12), Wayanad (5)	West Bengal	2	3,310	T	
June-22	Alappuzha (12), Ernakulam (14), Idukki (4), Kannur (3), Kasargod (9), Kollam (13), Kottayam (13), Kozhikode (5), Malappuram (17), Palakkad (16), Pathanamthitta (4), Thiruvananthapuram (11), Thrissur (12), Wayanad (5)	Andhra Pradesh	1	3,310	T	
June-22	Alappuzha (12), Ernakulam (14), Idukki (4), Kannur (3), Kasargod (9), Kollam (13), Kottayam (13), Kozhikode (5), Malappuram (17), Palakkad (16), Pathanamthitta (4), Thiruvananthapuram (11), Thrissur (12), Wayanad (5)	Bahrain	1	3,310	T	
June-22	Alappuzha (12), Ernakulam (14), Idukki (4), Kannur (3), Kasargod (9), Kollam (13), Kottayam (13), Kozhikode (5), Malappuram (17), Palakkad (16), Pathanamthitta (4), Thiruvananthapuram (11), Thrissur (12), Wayanad (5)	Karnataka	2	3,310	T	
June-22	Alappuzha (12), Ernakulam (14), Idukki (4), Kannur (3), Kasargod (9), Kollam (13), Kottayam (13), Kozhikode (5), Malappuram (17), Palakkad (16), Pathanamthitta (4), Thiruvananthapuram (11), Thrissur (12), Wayanad (5)	Nigeria	1	3,310	T	
June-22	Alappuzha (12), Ernakulam (14), Idukki (4), Kannur (3), Kasargod (9), Kollam (13), Kottayam (13), Kozhikode (5), Malappuram (17), Palakkad (16), Pathanamthitta (4), Thiruvananthapuram (11), Thrissur (12), Wayanad (5)	Punjab	1	3,310	T	
June-22	Alappuzha (12), Ernakulam (14), Idukki (4), Kannur (3), Kasargod (9), Kollam (13), Kottayam (13), Kozhikode (5), Malappuram (17), Palakkad (16), Pathanamthitta (4), Thiruvananthapuram (11), Thrissur (12), Wayanad (5)	Russia	1	3,310	T	
June-23	Alappuzha (19), Ernakulam (13), Idukki (2), Kannur (6), Kollam (4), Kottayam (8), Kozhikode (6), Malappuram (11), Palakkad (27), Pathanamthitta (27), Thiruvananthapuram (4), Thrissur (14), Wayanad (2)	Overseas	79	3,451	T	
June-23	Alappuzha (19), Ernakulam (13), Idukki (2), Kannur (6), Kollam (4), Kottayam (8), Kozhikode (6), Malappuram (11), Palakkad (27), Pathanamthitta (27), Thiruvananthapuram (4), Thrissur (14), Wayanad (2)	Other states	52	3,451	T	
June-23	Alappuzha (19), Ernakulam (13), Idukki (2), Kannur (6), Kollam (4), Kottayam (8), Kozhikode (6), Malappuram (11), Palakkad (27), Pathanamthitta (27), Thiruvananthapuram (4), Thrissur (14), Wayanad (2)	None	10	3,451	PTP	
June-24	Alappuzha (15), Ernakulam (8), Idukki (6), Kannur (17), Kasargod (6), Kollam (18), Kottayam (7), Kozhikode (3), Malappuram (10), Palakkad (16), Pathanamthitta (25), Thiruvananthapuram (4), Thrissur (15), Wayanad (2)	Overseas	98	3,603	T	
June-24	Alappuzha (15), Ernakulam (8), Idukki (6), Kannur (17), Kasargod (6), Kollam (18), Kottayam (7), Kozhikode (3), Malappuram (10), Palakkad (16), Pathanamthitta (25), Thiruvananthapuram (4), Thrissur (15), Wayanad (2)	Other states	46	3,603	T	
June-24	Alappuzha (15), Ernakulam (8), Idukki (6), Kannur (17), Kasargod (6), Kollam (18), Kottayam (7), Kozhikode (3), Malappuram (10), Palakkad (16), Pathanamthitta (25), Thiruvananthapuram (4), Thrissur (15), Wayanad (2)	None	8	3,603	PTP	
June-25	Alappuzha (18), Ernakulam (10), Idukki (3), Kannur (9), Kasargod (4), Kollam (13), Kottayam (2), Kozhikode (7), Malappuram (6), Palakkad (24), Pathanamthitta (13), Thiruvananthapuram (2), Thrissur (9), Wayanad (2)	Overseas	84	3,726	T	
June-25	Alappuzha (18), Ernakulam (10), Idukki (3), Kannur (9), Kasargod (4), Kollam (13), Kottayam (2), Kozhikode (7), Malappuram (6), Palakkad (24), Pathanamthitta (13), Thiruvananthapuram (2), Thrissur (9), Wayanad (2)	Other states	33	3,726	T	
June-25	Alappuzha (18), Ernakulam (10), Idukki (3), Kannur (9), Kasargod (4), Kollam (13), Kottayam (2), Kozhikode (7), Malappuram (6), Palakkad (24), Pathanamthitta (13), Thiruvananthapuram (2), Thrissur (9), Wayanad (2)	None	6	3,726	PTP	
June-26	Alappuzha (21), Ernakulam (9), Idukki (2), Kannur (13), Kasargod (2), Kollam (16), Kottayam (18), Kozhikode (7), Malappuram (16), Palakkad (23), Pathanamthitta (4), Thiruvananthapuram (7), Thrissur (7), Wayanad (5)	Kuwait	50	3,876	T	
June-26	Alappuzha (21), Ernakulam (9), Idukki (2), Kannur (13), Kasargod (2), Kollam (16), Kottayam (18), Kozhikode (7), Malappuram (16), Palakkad (23), Pathanamthitta (4), Thiruvananthapuram (7), Thrissur (7), Wayanad (5)	Maharashtra	15	3,876	T	
June-26	Alappuzha (21), Ernakulam (9), Idukki (2), Kannur (13), Kasargod (2), Kollam (16), Kottayam (18), Kozhikode (7), Malappuram (16), Palakkad (23), Pathanamthitta (4), Thiruvananthapuram (7), Thrissur (7), Wayanad (5)	Saudi Arabia	14	3,876	T	
June-26	Alappuzha (21), Ernakulam (9), Idukki (2), Kannur (13), Kasargod (2), Kollam (16), Kottayam (18), Kozhikode (7), Malappuram (16), Palakkad (23), Pathanamthitta (4), Thiruvananthapuram (7), Thrissur (7), Wayanad (5)	UAE	14	3,876	T	
June-26	Alappuzha (21), Ernakulam (9), Idukki (2), Kannur (13), Kasargod (2), Kollam (16), Kottayam (18), Kozhikode (7), Malappuram (16), Palakkad (23), Pathanamthitta (4), Thiruvananthapuram (7), Thrissur (7), Wayanad (5)	Delhi	11	3,876	T	
June-26	Alappuzha (21), Ernakulam (9), Idukki (2), Kannur (13), Kasargod (2), Kollam (16), Kottayam (18), Kozhikode (7), Malappuram (16), Palakkad (23), Pathanamthitta (4), Thiruvananthapuram (7), Thrissur (7), Wayanad (5)	Tamil Nadu	10	3,876	T	
June-26	Alappuzha (21), Ernakulam (9), Idukki (2), Kannur (13), Kasargod (2), Kollam (16), Kottayam (18), Kozhikode (7), Malappuram (16), Palakkad (23), Pathanamthitta (4), Thiruvananthapuram (7), Thrissur (7), Wayanad (5)	None	10	3,876	PTP	
June-26	Alappuzha (21), Ernakulam (9), Idukki (2), Kannur (13), Kasargod (2), Kollam (16), Kottayam (18), Kozhikode (7), Malappuram (16), Palakkad (23), Pathanamthitta (4), Thiruvananthapuram (7), Thrissur (7), Wayanad (5)	Qatar	6	3,876	T	
June-26	Alappuzha (21), Ernakulam (9), Idukki (2), Kannur (13), Kasargod (2), Kollam (16), Kottayam (18), Kozhikode (7), Malappuram (16), Palakkad (23), Pathanamthitta (4), Thiruvananthapuram (7), Thrissur (7), Wayanad (5)	Sri Lanka	5	3,876	T	
June-26	Alappuzha (21), Ernakulam (9), Idukki (2), Kannur (13), Kasargod (2), Kollam (16), Kottayam (18), Kozhikode (7), Malappuram (16), Palakkad (23), Pathanamthitta (4), Thiruvananthapuram (7), Thrissur (7), Wayanad (5)	Oman	4	3,876	T	
June-26	Alappuzha (21), Ernakulam (9), Idukki (2), Kannur (13), Kasargod (2), Kollam (16), Kottayam (18), Kozhikode (7), Malappuram (16), Palakkad (23), Pathanamthitta (4), Thiruvananthapuram (7), Thrissur (7), Wayanad (5)	Karnataka	2	3,876	T	
June-26	Alappuzha (21), Ernakulam (9), Idukki (2), Kannur (13), Kasargod (2), Kollam (16), Kottayam (18), Kozhikode (7), Malappuram (16), Palakkad (23), Pathanamthitta (4), Thiruvananthapuram (7), Thrissur (7), Wayanad (5)	Italy	1	3,876	T	
June-26	Alappuzha (21), Ernakulam (9), Idukki (2), Kannur (13), Kasargod (2), Kollam (16), Kottayam (18), Kozhikode (7), Malappuram (16), Palakkad (23), Pathanamthitta (4), Thiruvananthapuram (7), Thrissur (7), Wayanad (5)	Jharkhand	1	3,876	T	
June-26	Alappuzha (21), Ernakulam (9), Idukki (2), Kannur (13), Kasargod (2), Kollam (16), Kottayam (18), Kozhikode (7), Malappuram (16), Palakkad (23), Pathanamthitta (4), Thiruvananthapuram (7), Thrissur (7), Wayanad (5)	Madhya Pradesh	1	3,876	T	
June-26	Alappuzha (21), Ernakulam (9), Idukki (2), Kannur (13), Kasargod (2), Kollam (16), Kottayam (18), Kozhikode (7), Malappuram (16), Palakkad (23), Pathanamthitta (4), Thiruvananthapuram (7), Thrissur (7), Wayanad (5)	Telangana	1	3,876	T	
June-26	Alappuzha (21), Ernakulam (9), Idukki (2), Kannur (13), Kasargod (2), Kollam (16), Kottayam (18), Kozhikode (7), Malappuram (16), Palakkad (23), Pathanamthitta (4), Thiruvananthapuram (7), Thrissur (7), Wayanad (5)	Uttar Pradesh	1	3,876	T	
June-27	Alappuzha (13), Ernakulam (14), Idukki (2), Kannur (11), Kasargod (11), Kollam (12), Kottayam (15), Kozhikode (8), Malappuram (47), Palakkad (25), Pathanamthitta (6), Thiruvananthapuram (4), Thrissur (22), Wayanad (5)	Kuwait	62	4,071	T	
June-27	Alappuzha (13), Ernakulam (14), Idukki (2), Kannur (11), Kasargod (11), Kollam (12), Kottayam (15), Kozhikode (8), Malappuram (47), Palakkad (25), Pathanamthitta (6), Thiruvananthapuram (4), Thrissur (22), Wayanad (5)	UAE	26	4,071	T	
June-27	Alappuzha (13), Ernakulam (14), Idukki (2), Kannur (11), Kasargod (11), Kollam (12), Kottayam (15), Kozhikode (8), Malappuram (47), Palakkad (25), Pathanamthitta (6), Thiruvananthapuram (4), Thrissur (22), Wayanad (5)	Tamil Nadu	19	4,071	T	
June-27	Alappuzha (13), Ernakulam (14), Idukki (2), Kannur (11), Kasargod (11), Kollam (12), Kottayam (15), Kozhikode (8), Malappuram (47), Palakkad (25), Pathanamthitta (6), Thiruvananthapuram (4), Thrissur (22), Wayanad (5)	None	15	4,071	PTP	
June-27	Alappuzha (13), Ernakulam (14), Idukki (2), Kannur (11), Kasargod (11), Kollam (12), Kottayam (15), Kozhikode (8), Malappuram (47), Palakkad (25), Pathanamthitta (6), Thiruvananthapuram (4), Thrissur (22), Wayanad (5)	Delhi	13	4,071	T	
June-27	Alappuzha (13), Ernakulam (14), Idukki (2), Kannur (11), Kasargod (11), Kollam (12), Kottayam (15), Kozhikode (8), Malappuram (47), Palakkad (25), Pathanamthitta (6), Thiruvananthapuram (4), Thrissur (22), Wayanad (5)	Maharashtra	11	4,071	T	
June-27	Alappuzha (13), Ernakulam (14), Idukki (2), Kannur (11), Kasargod (11), Kollam (12), Kottayam (15), Kozhikode (8), Malappuram (47), Palakkad (25), Pathanamthitta (6), Thiruvananthapuram (4), Thrissur (22), Wayanad (5)	Karnataka	10	4,071	T	
June-27	Alappuzha (13), Ernakulam (14), Idukki (2), Kannur (11), Kasargod (11), Kollam (12), Kottayam (15), Kozhikode (8), Malappuram (47), Palakkad (25), Pathanamthitta (6), Thiruvananthapuram (4), Thrissur (22), Wayanad (5)	Oman	8	4,071	T	
June-27	Alappuzha (13), Ernakulam (14), Idukki (2), Kannur (11), Kasargod (11), Kollam (12), Kottayam (15), Kozhikode (8), Malappuram (47), Palakkad (25), Pathanamthitta (6), Thiruvananthapuram (4), Thrissur (22), Wayanad (5)	Saudi Arabia	8	4,071	T	
June-27	Alappuzha (13), Ernakulam (14), Idukki (2), Kannur (11), Kasargod (11), Kollam (12), Kottayam (15), Kozhikode (8), Malappuram (47), Palakkad (25), Pathanamthitta (6), Thiruvananthapuram (4), Thrissur (22), Wayanad (5)	Qatar	6	4,071	T	
June-27	Alappuzha (13), Ernakulam (14), Idukki (2), Kannur (11), Kasargod (11), Kollam (12), Kottayam (15), Kozhikode (8), Malappuram (47), Palakkad (25), Pathanamthitta (6), Thiruvananthapuram (4), Thrissur (22), Wayanad (5)	Bahrain	5	4,071	T	
June-27	Alappuzha (13), Ernakulam (14), Idukki (2), Kannur (11), Kasargod (11), Kollam (12), Kottayam (15), Kozhikode (8), Malappuram (47), Palakkad (25), Pathanamthitta (6), Thiruvananthapuram (4), Thrissur (22), Wayanad (5)	Madhya Pradesh	3	4,071	T	
June-27	Alappuzha (13), Ernakulam (14), Idukki (2), Kannur (11), Kasargod (11), Kollam (12), Kottayam (15), Kozhikode (8), Malappuram (47), Palakkad (25), Pathanamthitta (6), Thiruvananthapuram (4), Thrissur (22), Wayanad (5)	West Bengal	3	4,071	T	
June-27	Alappuzha (13), Ernakulam (14), Idukki (2), Kannur (11), Kasargod (11), Kollam (12), Kottayam (15), Kozhikode (8), Malappuram (47), Palakkad (25), Pathanamthitta (6), Thiruvananthapuram (4), Thrissur (22), Wayanad (5)	Kazakhstan	2	4,071	T	
June-27	Alappuzha (13), Ernakulam (14), Idukki (2), Kannur (11), Kasargod (11), Kollam (12), Kottayam (15), Kozhikode (8), Malappuram (47), Palakkad (25), Pathanamthitta (6), Thiruvananthapuram (4), Thrissur (22), Wayanad (5)	Andhra Pradesh	1	4,071	T	
June-27	Alappuzha (13), Ernakulam (14), Idukki (2), Kannur (11), Kasargod (11), Kollam (12), Kottayam (15), Kozhikode (8), Malappuram (47), Palakkad (25), Pathanamthitta (6), Thiruvananthapuram (4), Thrissur (22), Wayanad (5)	Egypt	1	4,071	T	
June-27	Alappuzha (13), Ernakulam (14), Idukki (2), Kannur (11), Kasargod (11), Kollam (12), Kottayam (15), Kozhikode (8), Malappuram (47), Palakkad (25), Pathanamthitta (6), Thiruvananthapuram (4), Thrissur (22), Wayanad (5)	Telangana	1	4,071	T	
June-27	Alappuzha (13), Ernakulam (14), Idukki (2), Kannur (11), Kasargod (11), Kollam (12), Kottayam (15), Kozhikode (8), Malappuram (47), Palakkad (25), Pathanamthitta (6), Thiruvananthapuram (4), Thrissur (22), Wayanad (5)	Jammu and Kashmir	1	4,071	T	
June-28	Alappuzha (10), Ernakulam (7), Idukki (4), Kannur (26), Kasargod (6), Kollam (10), Kottayam (5), Kozhikode (7), Malappuram (5), Palakkad (4), Pathanamthitta (3), Thiruvananthapuram (9), Thrissur (17), Wayanad (5)	Kuwait	19	4,189	T	
June-28	Alappuzha (10), Ernakulam (7), Idukki (4), Kannur (26), Kasargod (6), Kollam (10), Kottayam (5), Kozhikode (7), Malappuram (5), Palakkad (4), Pathanamthitta (3), Thiruvananthapuram (9), Thrissur (17), Wayanad (5)	UAE	15	4,189	T	
June-28	Alappuzha (10), Ernakulam (7), Idukki (4), Kannur (26), Kasargod (6), Kollam (10), Kottayam (5), Kozhikode (7), Malappuram (5), Palakkad (4), Pathanamthitta (3), Thiruvananthapuram (9), Thrissur (17), Wayanad (5)	None	14	4,189	PTP	
June-28	Alappuzha (10), Ernakulam (7), Idukki (4), Kannur (26), Kasargod (6), Kollam (10), Kottayam (5), Kozhikode (7), Malappuram (5), Palakkad (4), Pathanamthitta (3), Thiruvananthapuram (9), Thrissur (17), Wayanad (5)	Oman	13	4,189	T	
June-28	Alappuzha (10), Ernakulam (7), Idukki (4), Kannur (26), Kasargod (6), Kollam (10), Kottayam (5), Kozhikode (7), Malappuram (5), Palakkad (4), Pathanamthitta (3), Thiruvananthapuram (9), Thrissur (17), Wayanad (5)	Karnataka	10	4,189	T	
June-28	Alappuzha (10), Ernakulam (7), Idukki (4), Kannur (26), Kasargod (6), Kollam (10), Kottayam (5), Kozhikode (7), Malappuram (5), Palakkad (4), Pathanamthitta (3), Thiruvananthapuram (9), Thrissur (17), Wayanad (5)	Saudi Arabia	10	4,189	T	
June-28	Alappuzha (10), Ernakulam (7), Idukki (4), Kannur (26), Kasargod (6), Kollam (10), Kottayam (5), Kozhikode (7), Malappuram (5), Palakkad (4), Pathanamthitta (3), Thiruvananthapuram (9), Thrissur (17), Wayanad (5)	Delhi	7	4,189	T	
June-28	Alappuzha (10), Ernakulam (7), Idukki (4), Kannur (26), Kasargod (6), Kollam (10), Kottayam (5), Kozhikode (7), Malappuram (5), Palakkad (4), Pathanamthitta (3), Thiruvananthapuram (9), Thrissur (17), Wayanad (5)	Maharashtra	7	4,189	T	
June-28	Alappuzha (10), Ernakulam (7), Idukki (4), Kannur (26), Kasargod (6), Kollam (10), Kottayam (5), Kozhikode (7), Malappuram (5), Palakkad (4), Pathanamthitta (3), Thiruvananthapuram (9), Thrissur (17), Wayanad (5)	Tamil Nadu	5	4,189	T	
June-28	Alappuzha (10), Ernakulam (7), Idukki (4), Kannur (26), Kasargod (6), Kollam (10), Kottayam (5), Kozhikode (7), Malappuram (5), Palakkad (4), Pathanamthitta (3), Thiruvananthapuram (9), Thrissur (17), Wayanad (5)	Bahrain	4	4,189	T	
June-28	Alappuzha (10), Ernakulam (7), Idukki (4), Kannur (26), Kasargod (6), Kollam (10), Kottayam (5), Kozhikode (7), Malappuram (5), Palakkad (4), Pathanamthitta (3), Thiruvananthapuram (9), Thrissur (17), Wayanad (5)	Qatar	4	4,189	T	
June-28	Alappuzha (10), Ernakulam (7), Idukki (4), Kannur (26), Kasargod (6), Kollam (10), Kottayam (5), Kozhikode (7), Malappuram (5), Palakkad (4), Pathanamthitta (3), Thiruvananthapuram (9), Thrissur (17), Wayanad (5)	Chhattisgarh	2	4,189	T	
June-28	Alappuzha (10), Ernakulam (7), Idukki (4), Kannur (26), Kasargod (6), Kollam (10), Kottayam (5), Kozhikode (7), Malappuram (5), Palakkad (4), Pathanamthitta (3), Thiruvananthapuram (9), Thrissur (17), Wayanad (5)	Nigeria	2	4,189	T	
June-28	Alappuzha (10), Ernakulam (7), Idukki (4), Kannur (26), Kasargod (6), Kollam (10), Kottayam (5), Kozhikode (7), Malappuram (5), Palakkad (4), Pathanamthitta (3), Thiruvananthapuram (9), Thrissur (17), Wayanad (5)	Telangana	2	4,189	T	
June-28	Alappuzha (10), Ernakulam (7), Idukki (4), Kannur (26), Kasargod (6), Kollam (10), Kottayam (5), Kozhikode (7), Malappuram (5), Palakkad (4), Pathanamthitta (3), Thiruvananthapuram (9), Thrissur (17), Wayanad (5)	Ghana	1	4,189	T	
June-28	Alappuzha (10), Ernakulam (7), Idukki (4), Kannur (26), Kasargod (6), Kollam (10), Kottayam (5), Kozhikode (7), Malappuram (5), Palakkad (4), Pathanamthitta (3), Thiruvananthapuram (9), Thrissur (17), Wayanad (5)	Gujarat	1	4,189	T	
June-28	Alappuzha (10), Ernakulam (7), Idukki (4), Kannur (26), Kasargod (6), Kollam (10), Kottayam (5), Kozhikode (7), Malappuram (5), Palakkad (4), Pathanamthitta (3), Thiruvananthapuram (9), Thrissur (17), Wayanad (5)	Jammu and Kashmir	1	4,189	T	
June-28	Alappuzha (10), Ernakulam (7), Idukki (4), Kannur (26), Kasargod (6), Kollam (10), Kottayam (5), Kozhikode (7), Malappuram (5), Palakkad (4), Pathanamthitta (3), Thiruvananthapuram (9), Thrissur (17), Wayanad (5)	Rajasthan	1	4,189	T	
June-29	Alappuzha (5), Ernakulam (5), Idukki (5), Kannur (14), Kasargod (4), Kollam (11), Kottayam (8), Kozhikode (9), Malappuram (14), Palakkad (12), Pathanamthitta (13), Thiruvananthapuram (4), Thrissur (26), Wayanad (2)	Overseas	78	4,311	T	
June-29	Alappuzha (5), Ernakulam (5), Idukki (5), Kannur (14), Kasargod (4), Kollam (11), Kottayam (8), Kozhikode (9), Malappuram (14), Palakkad (12), Pathanamthitta (13), Thiruvananthapuram (4), Thrissur (26), Wayanad (2)	Other states	27	4,311	T	
June-29	Alappuzha (5), Ernakulam (5), Idukki (5), Kannur (14), Kasargod (4), Kollam (11), Kottayam (8), Kozhikode (9), Malappuram (14), Palakkad (12), Pathanamthitta (13), Thiruvananthapuram (4), Thrissur (26), Wayanad (2)	None	17	4,311	PTP	
June-30	Alappuzha (9), Ernakulam (10), Kannur (26), Kasargod (8), Kollam (12), Kottayam (3), Kozhikode (4), Malappuram (32), Palakkad (17), Pathanamthitta (1), Thiruvananthapuram (5), Thrissur (4)	KUW	25	4,442	T	
June-30	Alappuzha (9), Ernakulam (10), Kannur (26), Kasargod (8), Kollam (12), Kottayam (3), Kozhikode (4), Malappuram (32), Palakkad (17), Pathanamthitta (1), Thiruvananthapuram (5), Thrissur (4)	Tamil Nadu	13	4,442	T	
June-30	Alappuzha (9), Ernakulam (10), Kannur (26), Kasargod (8), Kollam (12), Kottayam (3), Kozhikode (4), Malappuram (32), Palakkad (17), Pathanamthitta (1), Thiruvananthapuram (5), Thrissur (4)	UAE	12	4,442	T	
June-30	Alappuzha (9), Ernakulam (10), Kannur (26), Kasargod (8), Kollam (12), Kottayam (3), Kozhikode (4), Malappuram (32), Palakkad (17), Pathanamthitta (1), Thiruvananthapuram (5), Thrissur (4)	Saudi Arabia	11	4,442	T	
June-30	Alappuzha (9), Ernakulam (10), Kannur (26), Kasargod (8), Kollam (12), Kottayam (3), Kozhikode (4), Malappuram (32), Palakkad (17), Pathanamthitta (1), Thiruvananthapuram (5), Thrissur (4)	Maharashtra	10	4,442	T	
June-30	Alappuzha (9), Ernakulam (10), Kannur (26), Kasargod (8), Kollam (12), Kottayam (3), Kozhikode (4), Malappuram (32), Palakkad (17), Pathanamthitta (1), Thiruvananthapuram (5), Thrissur (4)	None	10	4,442	PTP	
June-30	Alappuzha (9), Ernakulam (10), Kannur (26), Kasargod (8), Kollam (12), Kottayam (3), Kozhikode (4), Malappuram (32), Palakkad (17), Pathanamthitta (1), Thiruvananthapuram (5), Thrissur (4)	Oman	6	4,442	T	
June-30	Alappuzha (9), Ernakulam (10), Kannur (26), Kasargod (8), Kollam (12), Kottayam (3), Kozhikode (4), Malappuram (32), Palakkad (17), Pathanamthitta (1), Thiruvananthapuram (5), Thrissur (4)	Qatar	6	4,442	T	
June-30	Alappuzha (9), Ernakulam (10), Kannur (26), Kasargod (8), Kollam (12), Kottayam (3), Kozhikode (4), Malappuram (32), Palakkad (17), Pathanamthitta (1), Thiruvananthapuram (5), Thrissur (4)	Delhi	5	4,442	T	
June-30	Alappuzha (9), Ernakulam (10), Kannur (26), Kasargod (8), Kollam (12), Kottayam (3), Kozhikode (4), Malappuram (32), Palakkad (17), Pathanamthitta (1), Thiruvananthapuram (5), Thrissur (4)	Uttar Pradesh	5	4,442	T	
June-30	Alappuzha (9), Ernakulam (10), Kannur (26), Kasargod (8), Kollam (12), Kottayam (3), Kozhikode (4), Malappuram (32), Palakkad (17), Pathanamthitta (1), Thiruvananthapuram (5), Thrissur (4)	Karnataka	4	4,442	T	
June-30	Alappuzha (9), Ernakulam (10), Kannur (26), Kasargod (8), Kollam (12), Kottayam (3), Kozhikode (4), Malappuram (32), Palakkad (17), Pathanamthitta (1), Thiruvananthapuram (5), Thrissur (4)	Bihar	2	4,442	T	
June-30	Alappuzha (9), Ernakulam (10), Kannur (26), Kasargod (8), Kollam (12), Kottayam (3), Kozhikode (4), Malappuram (32), Palakkad (17), Pathanamthitta (1), Thiruvananthapuram (5), Thrissur (4)	Rajasthan	2	4,442	T	
June-30	Alappuzha (9), Ernakulam (10), Kannur (26), Kasargod (8), Kollam (12), Kottayam (3), Kozhikode (4), Malappuram (32), Palakkad (17), Pathanamthitta (1), Thiruvananthapuram (5), Thrissur (4)	Arunachal Pradesh	1	4,442	T	
June-30	Alappuzha (9), Ernakulam (10), Kannur (26), Kasargod (8), Kollam (12), Kottayam (3), Kozhikode (4), Malappuram (32), Palakkad (17), Pathanamthitta (1), Thiruvananthapuram (5), Thrissur (4)	Bahrain	1	4,442	T	
June-30	Alappuzha (9), Ernakulam (10), Kannur (26), Kasargod (8), Kollam (12), Kottayam (3), Kozhikode (4), Malappuram (32), Palakkad (17), Pathanamthitta (1), Thiruvananthapuram (5), Thrissur (4)	Ethiopia	1	4,442	T	
June-30	Alappuzha (9), Ernakulam (10), Kannur (26), Kasargod (8), Kollam (12), Kottayam (3), Kozhikode (4), Malappuram (32), Palakkad (17), Pathanamthitta (1), Thiruvananthapuram (5), Thrissur (4)	Haryana	1	4,442	T	
June-30	Alappuzha (9), Ernakulam (10), Kannur (26), Kasargod (8), Kollam (12), Kottayam (3), Kozhikode (4), Malappuram (32), Palakkad (17), Pathanamthitta (1), Thiruvananthapuram (5), Thrissur (4)	Himachal Pradesh	1	4,442	T	
June-30	Alappuzha (9), Ernakulam (10), Kannur (26), Kasargod (8), Kollam (12), Kottayam (3), Kozhikode (4), Malappuram (32), Palakkad (17), Pathanamthitta (1), Thiruvananthapuram (5), Thrissur (4)	Kazakhstan	1	4,442	T	
June-30	Alappuzha (9), Ernakulam (10), Kannur (26), Kasargod (8), Kollam (12), Kottayam (3), Kozhikode (4), Malappuram (32), Palakkad (17), Pathanamthitta (1), Thiruvananthapuram (5), Thrissur (4)	Moldova	1	4,442	T	
June-30	Alappuzha (9), Ernakulam (10), Kannur (26), Kasargod (8), Kollam (12), Kottayam (3), Kozhikode (4), Malappuram (32), Palakkad (17), Pathanamthitta (1), Thiruvananthapuram (5), Thrissur (4)	Punjab	1	4,442	T	
June-30	Alappuzha (9), Ernakulam (10), Kannur (26), Kasargod (8), Kollam (12), Kottayam (3), Kozhikode (4), Malappuram (32), Palakkad (17), Pathanamthitta (1), Thiruvananthapuram (5), Thrissur (4)	South Africa	1	4,442	T	
June-30	Alappuzha (9), Ernakulam (10), Kannur (26), Kasargod (8), Kollam (12), Kottayam (3), Kozhikode (4), Malappuram (32), Palakkad (17), Pathanamthitta (1), Thiruvananthapuram (5), Thrissur (4)	Uttarakhand	1	4,442	T	
July-01	Alappuzha (8), Ernakulam (12), Idukki (1), Kannur (27), Kasargod (10), Kollam (3), Kottayam (4), Kozhikode (6), Malappuram (34), Palakkad (17), Pathanamthitta (6), Thiruvananthapuram (4), Thrissur (18), Wayanad (3)	Overseas	86	4,593	T	
July-01	Alappuzha (8), Ernakulam (12), Idukki (1), Kannur (27), Kasargod (10), Kollam (3), Kottayam (4), Kozhikode (6), Malappuram (34), Palakkad (17), Pathanamthitta (6), Thiruvananthapuram (4), Thrissur (18), Wayanad (3)	Other states	51	4,593	T	
July-01	Alappuzha (8), Ernakulam (12), Idukki (1), Kannur (27), Kasargod (10), Kollam (3), Kottayam (4), Kozhikode (6), Malappuram (34), Palakkad (17), Pathanamthitta (6), Thiruvananthapuram (4), Thrissur (18), Wayanad (3)	None	14	4,593	PTP	
July-02	Alappuzha (16), Ernakulam (9), Idukki (8), Kannur (9), Kasargod (5), Kollam (9), Kottayam (9), Kozhikode (7), Malappuram (24), Palakkad (18), Pathanamthitta (27), Thiruvananthapuram (9), Thrissur (9), Wayanad (1)	UAE	27	4,753	T	
July-02	Alappuzha (16), Ernakulam (9), Idukki (8), Kannur (9), Kasargod (5), Kollam (9), Kottayam (9), Kozhikode (7), Malappuram (24), Palakkad (18), Pathanamthitta (27), Thiruvananthapuram (9), Thrissur (9), Wayanad (1)	Kuwait	21	4,753	T	
July-02	Alappuzha (16), Ernakulam (9), Idukki (8), Kannur (9), Kasargod (5), Kollam (9), Kottayam (9), Kozhikode (7), Malappuram (24), Palakkad (18), Pathanamthitta (27), Thiruvananthapuram (9), Thrissur (9), Wayanad (1)	Oman	21	4,753	T	
July-02	Alappuzha (16), Ernakulam (9), Idukki (8), Kannur (9), Kasargod (5), Kollam (9), Kottayam (9), Kozhikode (7), Malappuram (24), Palakkad (18), Pathanamthitta (27), Thiruvananthapuram (9), Thrissur (9), Wayanad (1)	Qatar	16	4,753	T	
July-02	Alappuzha (16), Ernakulam (9), Idukki (8), Kannur (9), Kasargod (5), Kollam (9), Kottayam (9), Kozhikode (7), Malappuram (24), Palakkad (18), Pathanamthitta (27), Thiruvananthapuram (9), Thrissur (9), Wayanad (1)	Saudi Arabia	15	4,753	T	
July-02	Alappuzha (16), Ernakulam (9), Idukki (8), Kannur (9), Kasargod (5), Kollam (9), Kottayam (9), Kozhikode (7), Malappuram (24), Palakkad (18), Pathanamthitta (27), Thiruvananthapuram (9), Thrissur (9), Wayanad (1)	None	14	4,753	PTP	
July-02	Alappuzha (16), Ernakulam (9), Idukki (8), Kannur (9), Kasargod (5), Kollam (9), Kottayam (9), Kozhikode (7), Malappuram (24), Palakkad (18), Pathanamthitta (27), Thiruvananthapuram (9), Thrissur (9), Wayanad (1)	Delhi	13	4,753	T	
July-02	Alappuzha (16), Ernakulam (9), Idukki (8), Kannur (9), Kasargod (5), Kollam (9), Kottayam (9), Kozhikode (7), Malappuram (24), Palakkad (18), Pathanamthitta (27), Thiruvananthapuram (9), Thrissur (9), Wayanad (1)	Maharashtra	10	4,753	T	
July-02	Alappuzha (16), Ernakulam (9), Idukki (8), Kannur (9), Kasargod (5), Kollam (9), Kottayam (9), Kozhikode (7), Malappuram (24), Palakkad (18), Pathanamthitta (27), Thiruvananthapuram (9), Thrissur (9), Wayanad (1)	Tamil Nadu	8	4,753	T	
July-02	Alappuzha (16), Ernakulam (9), Idukki (8), Kannur (9), Kasargod (5), Kollam (9), Kottayam (9), Kozhikode (7), Malappuram (24), Palakkad (18), Pathanamthitta (27), Thiruvananthapuram (9), Thrissur (9), Wayanad (1)	Karnataka	4	4,753	T	
July-02	Alappuzha (16), Ernakulam (9), Idukki (8), Kannur (9), Kasargod (5), Kollam (9), Kottayam (9), Kozhikode (7), Malappuram (24), Palakkad (18), Pathanamthitta (27), Thiruvananthapuram (9), Thrissur (9), Wayanad (1)	Bahrain	4	4,753	T	
July-02	Alappuzha (16), Ernakulam (9), Idukki (8), Kannur (9), Kasargod (5), Kollam (9), Kottayam (9), Kozhikode (7), Malappuram (24), Palakkad (18), Pathanamthitta (27), Thiruvananthapuram (9), Thrissur (9), Wayanad (1)	Ivory Coast	1	4,753	T	
July-02	Alappuzha (16), Ernakulam (9), Idukki (8), Kannur (9), Kasargod (5), Kollam (9), Kottayam (9), Kozhikode (7), Malappuram (24), Palakkad (18), Pathanamthitta (27), Thiruvananthapuram (9), Thrissur (9), Wayanad (1)	Gujarat	1	4,753	T	
July-02	Alappuzha (16), Ernakulam (9), Idukki (8), Kannur (9), Kasargod (5), Kollam (9), Kottayam (9), Kozhikode (7), Malappuram (24), Palakkad (18), Pathanamthitta (27), Thiruvananthapuram (9), Thrissur (9), Wayanad (1)	Moldova	1	4,753	T	
July-02	Alappuzha (16), Ernakulam (9), Idukki (8), Kannur (9), Kasargod (5), Kollam (9), Kottayam (9), Kozhikode (7), Malappuram (24), Palakkad (18), Pathanamthitta (27), Thiruvananthapuram (9), Thrissur (9), Wayanad (1)	Punjab	1	4,753	T	
July-02	Alappuzha (16), Ernakulam (9), Idukki (8), Kannur (9), Kasargod (5), Kollam (9), Kottayam (9), Kozhikode (7), Malappuram (24), Palakkad (18), Pathanamthitta (27), Thiruvananthapuram (9), Thrissur (9), Wayanad (1)	West Bengal	1	4,753	T	
July-03	Alappuzha (21), Ernakulam (17), Idukki (2), Kannur (18), Kasargod (7), Kollam (23), Kottayam (14), Kozhikode (14), Malappuram (35), Palakkad (14), Pathanamthitta (7), Thiruvananthapuram (17), Thrissur (21), Wayanad (1)	Overseas	138	4,964	T	
July-03	Alappuzha (21), Ernakulam (17), Idukki (2), Kannur (18), Kasargod (7), Kollam (23), Kottayam (14), Kozhikode (14), Malappuram (35), Palakkad (14), Pathanamthitta (7), Thiruvananthapuram (17), Thrissur (21), Wayanad (1)	Other states	39	4,964	T	
July-03	Alappuzha (21), Ernakulam (17), Idukki (2), Kannur (18), Kasargod (7), Kollam (23), Kottayam (14), Kozhikode (14), Malappuram (35), Palakkad (14), Pathanamthitta (7), Thiruvananthapuram (17), Thrissur (21), Wayanad (1)	None	27	4,964	PTP	
July-04	Alappuzha (20), Ernakulam (13), Idukki (2), Kannur (35), Kasargod (14), Kollam (16), Kottayam (6), Kozhikode (8), Malappuram (37), Palakkad (29), Pathanamthitta (22), Thiruvananthapuram (16), Thrissur (20), Wayanad (2)	Overseas	152	5,204	T	
July-04	Alappuzha (20), Ernakulam (13), Idukki (2), Kannur (35), Kasargod (14), Kollam (16), Kottayam (6), Kozhikode (8), Malappuram (37), Palakkad (29), Pathanamthitta (22), Thiruvananthapuram (16), Thrissur (20), Wayanad (2)	Other states	52	5,204	T	
July-04	Alappuzha (20), Ernakulam (13), Idukki (2), Kannur (35), Kasargod (14), Kollam (16), Kottayam (6), Kozhikode (8), Malappuram (37), Palakkad (29), Pathanamthitta (22), Thiruvananthapuram (16), Thrissur (20), Wayanad (2)	None	36	5,204	PTP	
July-05	Alappuzha (13), Ernakulam (12), Idukki (6), Kannur (25), Kasargod (28), Kollam (10), Kottayam (8), Kozhikode (20), Malappuram (26), Palakkad (29), Pathanamthitta (3), Thiruvananthapuram (27), Thrissur (12), Wayanad (6)	Overseas	117	5,429	T	
July-05	Alappuzha (13), Ernakulam (12), Idukki (6), Kannur (25), Kasargod (28), Kollam (10), Kottayam (8), Kozhikode (20), Malappuram (26), Palakkad (29), Pathanamthitta (3), Thiruvananthapuram (27), Thrissur (12), Wayanad (6)	Other states	57	5,429	T	
July-05	Alappuzha (13), Ernakulam (12), Idukki (6), Kannur (25), Kasargod (28), Kollam (10), Kottayam (8), Kozhikode (20), Malappuram (26), Palakkad (29), Pathanamthitta (3), Thiruvananthapuram (27), Thrissur (12), Wayanad (6)	None	51	5,429	PTP	
July-06	Alappuzha (15), Ernakulam (25), Idukki (6), Kannur (11), Kasargod (6), Kollam (11), Kottayam (6), Kozhikode (15), Malappuram (35), Palakkad (8), Pathanamthitta (26), Thiruvananthapuram (7), Thrissur (14), Wayanad (8)	Overseas	92	5,622	T	
July-06	Alappuzha (15), Ernakulam (25), Idukki (6), Kannur (11), Kasargod (6), Kollam (11), Kottayam (6), Kozhikode (15), Malappuram (35), Palakkad (8), Pathanamthitta (26), Thiruvananthapuram (7), Thrissur (14), Wayanad (8)	Other states	65	5,622	T	
July-06	Alappuzha (15), Ernakulam (25), Idukki (6), Kannur (11), Kasargod (6), Kollam (11), Kottayam (6), Kozhikode (15), Malappuram (35), Palakkad (8), Pathanamthitta (26), Thiruvananthapuram (7), Thrissur (14), Wayanad (8)	None	35	5,622	PTP	
July-07	Alappuzha (18), Ernakulam (21), Idukki (1), Kannur (19), Kasargod (13), Kollam (11), Kottayam (3), Kozhikode (15), Malappuram (63), Palakkad (29), Pathanamthitta (12), Thiruvananthapuram (54), Thrissur (10), Wayanad (3)	Overseas	157	5,894	T	
July-07	Alappuzha (18), Ernakulam (21), Idukki (1), Kannur (19), Kasargod (13), Kollam (11), Kottayam (3), Kozhikode (15), Malappuram (63), Palakkad (29), Pathanamthitta (12), Thiruvananthapuram (54), Thrissur (10), Wayanad (3)	None	68	5,894	PTP	
July-07	Alappuzha (18), Ernakulam (21), Idukki (1), Kannur (19), Kasargod (13), Kollam (11), Kottayam (3), Kozhikode (15), Malappuram (63), Palakkad (29), Pathanamthitta (12), Thiruvananthapuram (54), Thrissur (10), Wayanad (3)	Other states	38	5,894	T	
July-08	Alappuzha (18), Ernakulam (16), Idukki (20), Kannur (22), Kasargod (4), Kollam (8), Kottayam (17), Kozhikode (15), Malappuram (46), Palakkad (25), Pathanamthitta (7), Thiruvananthapuram (64), Thrissur (25), Wayanad (14)	None	110	6,195	PTP	
July-08	Alappuzha (18), Ernakulam (16), Idukki (20), Kannur (22), Kasargod (4), Kollam (8), Kottayam (17), Kozhikode (15), Malappuram (46), Palakkad (25), Pathanamthitta (7), Thiruvananthapuram (64), Thrissur (25), Wayanad (14)	Overseas	99	6,195	T	
July-08	Alappuzha (18), Ernakulam (16), Idukki (20), Kannur (22), Kasargod (4), Kollam (8), Kottayam (17), Kozhikode (15), Malappuram (46), Palakkad (25), Pathanamthitta (7), Thiruvananthapuram (64), Thrissur (25), Wayanad (14)	Other states	95	6,195	T	
July-09	Alappuzha (22), Ernakulam (12), Idukki (20), Kannur (8), Kasargod (11), Kollam (10), Kottayam (7), Kozhikode (8), Malappuram (55), Palakkad (50), Pathanamthitta (7), Thiruvananthapuram (95), Thrissur (27), Wayanad (7)	None	148	6,534	PTP	
July-09	Alappuzha (22), Ernakulam (12), Idukki (20), Kannur (8), Kasargod (11), Kollam (10), Kottayam (7), Kozhikode (8), Malappuram (55), Palakkad (50), Pathanamthitta (7), Thiruvananthapuram (95), Thrissur (27), Wayanad (7)	Overseas	117	6,534	T	
July-09	Alappuzha (22), Ernakulam (12), Idukki (20), Kannur (8), Kasargod (11), Kollam (10), Kottayam (7), Kozhikode (8), Malappuram (55), Palakkad (50), Pathanamthitta (7), Thiruvananthapuram (95), Thrissur (27), Wayanad (7)	Other states	74	6,534	T	
July-10	Alappuzha (50), Ernakulam (20), Idukki (12), Kannur (23), Kasargod (17), Kollam (28), Kottayam (7), Kozhikode (12), Malappuram (41), Palakkad (28), Pathanamthitta (32), Thiruvananthapuram (129), Thrissur (17)	None	242	6,950	PTP	
July-10	Alappuzha (50), Ernakulam (20), Idukki (12), Kannur (23), Kasargod (17), Kollam (28), Kottayam (7), Kozhikode (12), Malappuram (41), Palakkad (28), Pathanamthitta (32), Thiruvananthapuram (129), Thrissur (17)	Overseas	123	6,950	T	
July-10	Alappuzha (50), Ernakulam (20), Idukki (12), Kannur (23), Kasargod (17), Kollam (28), Kottayam (7), Kozhikode (12), Malappuram (41), Palakkad (28), Pathanamthitta (32), Thiruvananthapuram (129), Thrissur (17)	Other states	51	6,950	T	
July-11	Alappuzha (87), Ernakulam (47), Idukki (5), Kannur (19), Kasargod (18), Kollam (18), Kottayam (15), Kozhikode (17), Malappuram (51), Palakkad (48), Pathanamthitta (54), Thiruvananthapuram (69), Thrissur (29), Wayanad (11)	None	234	7,438	PTP	
July-11	Alappuzha (87), Ernakulam (47), Idukki (5), Kannur (19), Kasargod (18), Kollam (18), Kottayam (15), Kozhikode (17), Malappuram (51), Palakkad (48), Pathanamthitta (54), Thiruvananthapuram (69), Thrissur (29), Wayanad (11)	Overseas	167	7,438	T	
July-11	Alappuzha (87), Ernakulam (47), Idukki (5), Kannur (19), Kasargod (18), Kollam (18), Kottayam (15), Kozhikode (17), Malappuram (51), Palakkad (48), Pathanamthitta (54), Thiruvananthapuram (69), Thrissur (29), Wayanad (11)	Other states	76	7,438	T	
July-12	Alappuzha (57), Ernakulam (50), Idukki (16), Kannur (17), Kasargod (56), Kollam (5), Kottayam (12), Kozhikode (4), Malappuram (42), Palakkad (59), Pathanamthitta (39), Thiruvananthapuram (40), Thrissur (19), Wayanad (19)	None	220	7,873	PTP	
July-12	Alappuzha (57), Ernakulam (50), Idukki (16), Kannur (17), Kasargod (56), Kollam (5), Kottayam (12), Kozhikode (4), Malappuram (42), Palakkad (59), Pathanamthitta (39), Thiruvananthapuram (40), Thrissur (19), Wayanad (19)	Overseas	128	7,873	T	
July-12	Alappuzha (57), Ernakulam (50), Idukki (16), Kannur (17), Kasargod (56), Kollam (5), Kottayam (12), Kozhikode (4), Malappuram (42), Palakkad (59), Pathanamthitta (39), Thiruvananthapuram (40), Thrissur (19), Wayanad (19)	Other states	87	7,873	T	
July-13	Alappuzha (119), Ernakulam (15), Idukki (4), Kannur (44), Kasargod (9), Kollam (33), Kottayam (10), Kozhikode (16), Malappuram (47), Palakkad (19), Pathanamthitta (47), Thiruvananthapuram (63), Thrissur (9), Wayanad (14)	None	245	8,322	PTP	
July-13	Alappuzha (119), Ernakulam (15), Idukki (4), Kannur (44), Kasargod (9), Kollam (33), Kottayam (10), Kozhikode (16), Malappuram (47), Palakkad (19), Pathanamthitta (47), Thiruvananthapuram (63), Thrissur (9), Wayanad (14)	Overseas	140	8,322	T	
July-13	Alappuzha (119), Ernakulam (15), Idukki (4), Kannur (44), Kasargod (9), Kollam (33), Kottayam (10), Kozhikode (16), Malappuram (47), Palakkad (19), Pathanamthitta (47), Thiruvananthapuram (63), Thrissur (9), Wayanad (14)	Other states	64	8,322	T	
July-14	Alappuzha (34), Ernakulam (70), Kannur (12), Kasargod (44), Kollam (23), Kottayam (25), Kozhikode (58), Malappuram (58), Palakkad (26), Pathanamthitta (3), Thiruvananthapuram (201), Thrissur (42), Wayanad (12)	None	410	8,930	PTP	
July-14	Alappuzha (34), Ernakulam (70), Kannur (12), Kasargod (44), Kollam (23), Kottayam (25), Kozhikode (58), Malappuram (58), Palakkad (26), Pathanamthitta (3), Thiruvananthapuram (201), Thrissur (42), Wayanad (12)	Overseas	130	8,930	T	
July-14	Alappuzha (34), Ernakulam (70), Kannur (12), Kasargod (44), Kollam (23), Kottayam (25), Kozhikode (58), Malappuram (58), Palakkad (26), Pathanamthitta (3), Thiruvananthapuram (201), Thrissur (42), Wayanad (12)	Other states	68	8,930	T	
July-15	Alappuzha (20), Ernakulam (72), Idukki (55), Kannur (35), Kasargod (74), Kollam (11), Kottayam (25), Kozhikode (64), Malappuram (18), Palakkad (19), Pathanamthitta (64), Thiruvananthapuram (157), Thrissur (5), Wayanad (4)	None	451	9,553	PTP	
July-15	Alappuzha (20), Ernakulam (72), Idukki (55), Kannur (35), Kasargod (74), Kollam (11), Kottayam (25), Kozhikode (64), Malappuram (18), Palakkad (19), Pathanamthitta (64), Thiruvananthapuram (157), Thrissur (5), Wayanad (4)	Overseas	96	9,553	T	
July-15	Alappuzha (20), Ernakulam (72), Idukki (55), Kannur (35), Kasargod (74), Kollam (11), Kottayam (25), Kozhikode (64), Malappuram (18), Palakkad (19), Pathanamthitta (64), Thiruvananthapuram (157), Thrissur (5), Wayanad (4)	Other states	76	9,553	T	
July-16	Alappuzha (20), Ernakulam (57), Idukki (26), Kannur (23), Kasargod (18), Kollam (42), Kottayam (13), Kozhikode (33), Malappuram (42), Palakkad (25), Pathanamthitta (39), Thiruvananthapuram (339), Thrissur (32), Wayanad (13)	None	501	10,275	PTP	
July-16	Alappuzha (20), Ernakulam (57), Idukki (26), Kannur (23), Kasargod (18), Kollam (42), Kottayam (13), Kozhikode (33), Malappuram (42), Palakkad (25), Pathanamthitta (39), Thiruvananthapuram (339), Thrissur (32), Wayanad (13)	Overseas	157	10,275	T	
July-16	Alappuzha (20), Ernakulam (57), Idukki (26), Kannur (23), Kasargod (18), Kollam (42), Kottayam (13), Kozhikode (33), Malappuram (42), Palakkad (25), Pathanamthitta (39), Thiruvananthapuram (339), Thrissur (32), Wayanad (13)	Other states	62	10,275	T	
July-17	Alappuzha (57), Ernakulam (115), Idukki (11), Kannur (9), Kasargod (32), Kollam (47), Kottayam (39), Kozhikode (32), Malappuram (25), Palakkad (31), Pathanamthitta (87), Thiruvananthapuram (246), Thrissur (32), Wayanad (28)	None	556	11,066	PTP	
July-17	Alappuzha (57), Ernakulam (115), Idukki (11), Kannur (9), Kasargod (32), Kollam (47), Kottayam (39), Kozhikode (32), Malappuram (25), Palakkad (31), Pathanamthitta (87), Thiruvananthapuram (246), Thrissur (32), Wayanad (28)	Overseas	135	11,066	T	
July-17	Alappuzha (57), Ernakulam (115), Idukki (11), Kannur (9), Kasargod (32), Kollam (47), Kottayam (39), Kozhikode (32), Malappuram (25), Palakkad (31), Pathanamthitta (87), Thiruvananthapuram (246), Thrissur (32), Wayanad (28)	Other states	98	11,066	T	
July-18	Alappuzha (42), Ernakulam (44), Idukki (28), Kannur (39), Kasargod (29), Kollam (53), Kottayam (16), Kozhikode (26), Malappuram (19), Palakkad (49), Pathanamthitta (28), Thiruvananthapuram (173), Thrissur (21), Wayanad (26)	None	387	11,659	PTP	
July-18	Alappuzha (42), Ernakulam (44), Idukki (28), Kannur (39), Kasargod (29), Kollam (53), Kottayam (16), Kozhikode (26), Malappuram (19), Palakkad (49), Pathanamthitta (28), Thiruvananthapuram (173), Thrissur (21), Wayanad (26)	Overseas	116	11,659	T	
July-18	Alappuzha (42), Ernakulam (44), Idukki (28), Kannur (39), Kasargod (29), Kollam (53), Kottayam (16), Kozhikode (26), Malappuram (19), Palakkad (49), Pathanamthitta (28), Thiruvananthapuram (173), Thrissur (21), Wayanad (26)	Other states	90	11,659	T	
July-19	Alappuzha (52), Ernakulam (98), Idukki (49), Kannur (13), Kasargod (57), Kollam (75), Kottayam (20), Kozhikode (32), Malappuram (25), Palakkad (81), Pathanamthitta (35), Thiruvananthapuram (222), Thrissur (61), Wayanad (1)	None	629	12,480	PTP	
July-19	Alappuzha (52), Ernakulam (98), Idukki (49), Kannur (13), Kasargod (57), Kollam (75), Kottayam (20), Kozhikode (32), Malappuram (25), Palakkad (81), Pathanamthitta (35), Thiruvananthapuram (222), Thrissur (61), Wayanad (1)	Overseas	110	12,480	T	
July-19	Alappuzha (52), Ernakulam (98), Idukki (49), Kannur (13), Kasargod (57), Kollam (75), Kottayam (20), Kozhikode (32), Malappuram (25), Palakkad (81), Pathanamthitta (35), Thiruvananthapuram (222), Thrissur (61), Wayanad (1)	Other states	69	12,480	T	
July-20	Alappuzha (53), Ernakulam (72), Idukki (24), Kannur (48), Kasargod (28), Kollam (79), Kottayam (46), Kozhikode (92), Malappuram (50), Palakkad (49), Pathanamthitta (3), Thiruvananthapuram (182), Thrissur (42), Wayanad (26)	None	541	13,274	PTP	
July-20	Alappuzha (53), Ernakulam (72), Idukki (24), Kannur (48), Kasargod (28), Kollam (79), Kottayam (46), Kozhikode (92), Malappuram (50), Palakkad (49), Pathanamthitta (3), Thiruvananthapuram (182), Thrissur (42), Wayanad (26)	Overseas	148	13,274	T	
July-20	Alappuzha (53), Ernakulam (72), Idukki (24), Kannur (48), Kasargod (28), Kollam (79), Kottayam (46), Kozhikode (92), Malappuram (50), Palakkad (49), Pathanamthitta (3), Thiruvananthapuram (182), Thrissur (42), Wayanad (26)	Other states	105	13,274	T	
July-21	Alappuzha (46), Ernakulam (80), Kannur (57), Kasargod (40), Kollam (85), Kottayam (39), Kozhikode (39), Malappuram (61), Palakkad (46), Pathanamthitta (40), Thiruvananthapuram (151), Thrissur (19), Wayanad (17)	None	584	13,994	PTP	
July-21	Alappuzha (46), Ernakulam (80), Kannur (57), Kasargod (40), Kollam (85), Kottayam (39), Kozhikode (39), Malappuram (61), Palakkad (46), Pathanamthitta (40), Thiruvananthapuram (151), Thrissur (19), Wayanad (17)	Overseas	82	13,994	T	
July-21	Alappuzha (46), Ernakulam (80), Kannur (57), Kasargod (40), Kollam (85), Kottayam (39), Kozhikode (39), Malappuram (61), Palakkad (46), Pathanamthitta (40), Thiruvananthapuram (151), Thrissur (19), Wayanad (17)	Other states	54	13,994	T	
July-22	Alappuzha (120), Ernakulam (92), Idukki (43), Kannur (43), Kasargod (101), Kollam (133), Kottayam (51), Kozhikode (25), Malappuram (61), Palakkad (34), Pathanamthitta (49), Thiruvananthapuram (226), Thrissur (56), Wayanad (4)	None	842	15,032	PTP	
July-22	Alappuzha (120), Ernakulam (92), Idukki (43), Kannur (43), Kasargod (101), Kollam (133), Kottayam (51), Kozhikode (25), Malappuram (61), Palakkad (34), Pathanamthitta (49), Thiruvananthapuram (226), Thrissur (56), Wayanad (4)	Other states	87	15,032	T	
July-22	Alappuzha (120), Ernakulam (92), Idukki (43), Kannur (43), Kasargod (101), Kollam (133), Kottayam (51), Kozhikode (25), Malappuram (61), Palakkad (34), Pathanamthitta (49), Thiruvananthapuram (226), Thrissur (56), Wayanad (4)	Overseas	109	15,032	T	
July-23	Alappuzha (82), Ernakulam (100), Idukki (63), Kannur (5), Kasargod (47), Kollam (106), Kottayam (80), Kozhikode (6), Malappuram (89), Palakkad (51), Pathanamthitta (27), Thiruvananthapuram (222), Thrissur (83), Wayanad (10)	None	859	16,100	PTP	
July-23	Alappuzha (82), Ernakulam (100), Idukki (63), Kannur (5), Kasargod (47), Kollam (106), Kottayam (80), Kozhikode (6), Malappuram (89), Palakkad (51), Pathanamthitta (27), Thiruvananthapuram (222), Thrissur (83), Wayanad (10)	Other states	115	16,100	T	
July-23	Alappuzha (82), Ernakulam (100), Idukki (63), Kannur (5), Kasargod (47), Kollam (106), Kottayam (80), Kozhikode (6), Malappuram (89), Palakkad (51), Pathanamthitta (27), Thiruvananthapuram (222), Thrissur (83), Wayanad (10)	Overseas	104	16,100	T	
July-24	Alappuzha (44), Ernakulam (69), Idukki (29), Kannur (18), Kasargod (106), Kollam (133), Kottayam (50), Kozhikode (82), Malappuram (58), Palakkad (58), Pathanamthitta (23), Thiruvananthapuram (167), Thrissur (33), Wayanad (15)	None	753	16,995	PTP	
July-24	Alappuzha (44), Ernakulam (69), Idukki (29), Kannur (18), Kasargod (106), Kollam (133), Kottayam (50), Kozhikode (82), Malappuram (58), Palakkad (58), Pathanamthitta (23), Thiruvananthapuram (167), Thrissur (33), Wayanad (15)	Other states	68	16,995	T	
July-24	Alappuzha (44), Ernakulam (69), Idukki (29), Kannur (18), Kasargod (106), Kollam (133), Kottayam (50), Kozhikode (82), Malappuram (58), Palakkad (58), Pathanamthitta (23), Thiruvananthapuram (167), Thrissur (33), Wayanad (15)	Overseas	64	16,995	T	
July-25	Alappuzha (102), Ernakulam (79), Idukki (40), Kannur (62), Kasargod (105), Kollam (80), Kottayam (77), Kozhikode (110), Malappuram (68), Palakkad (35), Pathanamthitta (52), Thiruvananthapuram (240), Thrissur (36), Wayanad (17)	None	878	18,098	PTP	
July-25	Alappuzha (102), Ernakulam (79), Idukki (40), Kannur (62), Kasargod (105), Kollam (80), Kottayam (77), Kozhikode (110), Malappuram (68), Palakkad (35), Pathanamthitta (52), Thiruvananthapuram (240), Thrissur (36), Wayanad (17)	Overseas	119	18,098	T	
July-25	Alappuzha (102), Ernakulam (79), Idukki (40), Kannur (62), Kasargod (105), Kollam (80), Kottayam (77), Kozhikode (110), Malappuram (68), Palakkad (35), Pathanamthitta (52), Thiruvananthapuram (240), Thrissur (36), Wayanad (17)	Other states	106	18,098	T	
July-26	Alappuzha (46), Ernakulam (61), Idukki (48), Kannur (47), Kasargod (107), Kollam (74), Kottayam (54), Kozhikode (57), Malappuram (56), Palakkad (42), Pathanamthitta (91), Thiruvananthapuram (175), Thrissur (41), Wayanad (42)	None	760	19,025	PTP	
July-26	Alappuzha (46), Ernakulam (61), Idukki (48), Kannur (47), Kasargod (107), Kollam (74), Kottayam (54), Kozhikode (57), Malappuram (56), Palakkad (42), Pathanamthitta (91), Thiruvananthapuram (175), Thrissur (41), Wayanad (42)	Other states	91	19,025	T	
July-26	Alappuzha (46), Ernakulam (61), Idukki (48), Kannur (47), Kasargod (107), Kollam (74), Kottayam (54), Kozhikode (57), Malappuram (56), Palakkad (42), Pathanamthitta (91), Thiruvananthapuram (175), Thrissur (41), Wayanad (42)	Overseas	76	19,025	T	
July-27	Alappuzha (30), Ernakulam (15), Idukki (70), Kannur (38), Kasargod (38), Kollam (22), Kottayam (59), Kozhikode (68), Malappuram (86), Palakkad (41), Pathanamthitta (17), Thiruvananthapuram (161), Thrissur (40), Wayanad (17)	None	536	19,727	PTP	
July-27	Alappuzha (30), Ernakulam (15), Idukki (70), Kannur (38), Kasargod (38), Kollam (22), Kottayam (59), Kozhikode (68), Malappuram (86), Palakkad (41), Pathanamthitta (17), Thiruvananthapuram (161), Thrissur (40), Wayanad (17)	Other states	91	19,727	T	
July-27	Alappuzha (30), Ernakulam (15), Idukki (70), Kannur (38), Kasargod (38), Kollam (22), Kottayam (59), Kozhikode (68), Malappuram (86), Palakkad (41), Pathanamthitta (17), Thiruvananthapuram (161), Thrissur (40), Wayanad (17)	Overseas	75	19,727	T	
July-28	Alappuzha (84), Ernakulam (70), Idukki (7), Kannur (43), Kasargod (38), Kollam (95), Kottayam (118), Kozhikode (67), Malappuram (112), Palakkad (86), Pathanamthitta (63), Thiruvananthapuram (227), Thrissur (109), Wayanad (53)	None	949	20,894	PTP	
July-28	Alappuzha (84), Ernakulam (70), Idukki (7), Kannur (43), Kasargod (38), Kollam (95), Kottayam (118), Kozhikode (67), Malappuram (112), Palakkad (86), Pathanamthitta (63), Thiruvananthapuram (227), Thrissur (109), Wayanad (53)	Overseas	122	20,894	T	
July-28	Alappuzha (84), Ernakulam (70), Idukki (7), Kannur (43), Kasargod (38), Kollam (95), Kottayam (118), Kozhikode (67), Malappuram (112), Palakkad (86), Pathanamthitta (63), Thiruvananthapuram (227), Thrissur (109), Wayanad (53)	Other states	96	20,894	T	
July-29	Alappuzha (38), Ernakulam (83), Idukki (34), Kannur (42), Kasargod (49), Kollam (84), Kottayam (29), Kozhikode (67), Malappuram (87), Palakkad (49), Pathanamthitta (54), Thiruvananthapuram (213), Thrissur (31), Wayanad (43)	None	742	21,797	PTP	
July-29	Alappuzha (38), Ernakulam (83), Idukki (34), Kannur (42), Kasargod (49), Kollam (84), Kottayam (29), Kozhikode (67), Malappuram (87), Palakkad (49), Pathanamthitta (54), Thiruvananthapuram (213), Thrissur (31), Wayanad (43)	Overseas	90	21,797	T	
July-29	Alappuzha (38), Ernakulam (83), Idukki (34), Kannur (42), Kasargod (49), Kollam (84), Kottayam (29), Kozhikode (67), Malappuram (87), Palakkad (49), Pathanamthitta (54), Thiruvananthapuram (213), Thrissur (31), Wayanad (43)	Other states	71	21,797	T	
July-30	Alappuzha (55), Ernakulam (34), Idukki (6), Kannur (39), Kasargod (28), Kollam (22), Kottayam (29), Kozhikode (42), Malappuram (32), Palakkad (4), Pathanamthitta (59), Thiruvananthapuram (70), Thrissur (83), Wayanad (3)	None	435	22,303	PTP	
July-30	Alappuzha (55), Ernakulam (34), Idukki (6), Kannur (39), Kasargod (28), Kollam (22), Kottayam (29), Kozhikode (42), Malappuram (32), Palakkad (4), Pathanamthitta (59), Thiruvananthapuram (70), Thrissur (83), Wayanad (3)	Other states	40	22,303	T	
July-30	Alappuzha (55), Ernakulam (34), Idukki (6), Kannur (39), Kasargod (28), Kollam (22), Kottayam (29), Kozhikode (42), Malappuram (32), Palakkad (4), Pathanamthitta (59), Thiruvananthapuram (70), Thrissur (83), Wayanad (3)	Overseas	31	22,303	T	
July-31	Alappuzha (35), Ernakulam (132), Idukki (59), Kannur (14), Kasargod (52), Kollam (53), Kottayam (89), Kozhikode (84), Malappuram (73), Palakkad (83), Pathanamthitta (130), Thiruvananthapuram (320), Thrissur (60), Wayanad (124)	None	1208	23,612	PTP	
July-31	Alappuzha (35), Ernakulam (132), Idukki (59), Kannur (14), Kasargod (52), Kollam (53), Kottayam (89), Kozhikode (84), Malappuram (73), Palakkad (83), Pathanamthitta (130), Thiruvananthapuram (320), Thrissur (60), Wayanad (124)	Other states	54	23,612	T	
July-31	Alappuzha (35), Ernakulam (132), Idukki (59), Kannur (14), Kasargod (52), Kollam (53), Kottayam (89), Kozhikode (84), Malappuram (73), Palakkad (83), Pathanamthitta (130), Thiruvananthapuram (320), Thrissur (60), Wayanad (124)	Overseas	48	23,612	T	
August-1	Alappuzha (67), Ernakulam (59), Idukki (14), Kannur (5), Kasargod (153), Kollam (35), Kottayam (89), Kozhikode (95), Malappuram (141), Palakkad (47), Pathanamthitta (85), Thiruvananthapuram (259), Thrissur (76), Wayanad (46)	None	926	24,742	PTP	
August-1	Alappuzha (67), Ernakulam (59), Idukki (14), Kannur (5), Kasargod (153), Kollam (35), Kottayam (89), Kozhikode (95), Malappuram (141), Palakkad (47), Pathanamthitta (85), Thiruvananthapuram (259), Thrissur (76), Wayanad (46)	Other states	114	24,742	T	
August-1	Alappuzha (67), Ernakulam (59), Idukki (14), Kannur (5), Kasargod (153), Kollam (35), Kottayam (89), Kozhikode (95), Malappuram (141), Palakkad (47), Pathanamthitta (85), Thiruvananthapuram (259), Thrissur (76), Wayanad (46)	Overseas	89	24,742	T	
August-2	Alappuzha (38), Ernakulam (128), Idukki (42), Kannur (16), Kasargod (113), Kollam (69), Kottayam (70), Kozhikode (50), Malappuram (126), Palakkad (38), Pathanamthitta (25), Thiruvananthapuram (377), Thrissur (58), Wayanad (19)	None	1031	25,911	PTP	
August-2	Alappuzha (38), Ernakulam (128), Idukki (42), Kannur (16), Kasargod (113), Kollam (69), Kottayam (70), Kozhikode (50), Malappuram (126), Palakkad (38), Pathanamthitta (25), Thiruvananthapuram (377), Thrissur (58), Wayanad (19)	Other states	95	25,911	T	
August-2	Alappuzha (38), Ernakulam (128), Idukki (42), Kannur (16), Kasargod (113), Kollam (69), Kottayam (70), Kozhikode (50), Malappuram (126), Palakkad (38), Pathanamthitta (25), Thiruvananthapuram (377), Thrissur (58), Wayanad (19)	Overseas	43	25,911	T	
August-3	Alappuzha (101), Ernakulam (106), Idukki (26), Kannur (37), Kasargod (66), Kollam (57), Kottayam (35), Kozhikode (33), Malappuram (85), Palakkad (59), Pathanamthitta (36), Thiruvananthapuram (205), Thrissur (85), Wayanad (31)	None	822	26,873	PTP	
August-3	Alappuzha (101), Ernakulam (106), Idukki (26), Kannur (37), Kasargod (66), Kollam (57), Kottayam (35), Kozhikode (33), Malappuram (85), Palakkad (59), Pathanamthitta (36), Thiruvananthapuram (205), Thrissur (85), Wayanad (31)	Other states	85	26,873	T	
August-3	Alappuzha (101), Ernakulam (106), Idukki (26), Kannur (37), Kasargod (66), Kollam (57), Kottayam (35), Kozhikode (33), Malappuram (85), Palakkad (59), Pathanamthitta (36), Thiruvananthapuram (205), Thrissur (85), Wayanad (31)	Overseas	55	26,873	T	
August-4	Alappuzha (126), Ernakulam (135), Kannur (37), Kasargod (91), Kollam (30), Kottayam (23), Kozhikode (97), Malappuram (131), Palakkad (50), Pathanamthitta (32), Thiruvananthapuram (242), Thrissur (72), Wayanad (17)	None	968	27,956	PTP	
August-4	Alappuzha (126), Ernakulam (135), Kannur (37), Kasargod (91), Kollam (30), Kottayam (23), Kozhikode (97), Malappuram (131), Palakkad (50), Pathanamthitta (32), Thiruvananthapuram (242), Thrissur (72), Wayanad (17)	Other states	64	27,956	T	
August-4	Alappuzha (126), Ernakulam (135), Kannur (37), Kasargod (91), Kollam (30), Kottayam (23), Kozhikode (97), Malappuram (131), Palakkad (50), Pathanamthitta (32), Thiruvananthapuram (242), Thrissur (72), Wayanad (17)	Overseas	51	27,956	T	
August-5	Alappuzha (108), Ernakulam (120), Idukki (39), Kannur (61), Kasargod (128), Kollam (30), Kottayam (51), Kozhikode (39), Malappuram (167), Palakkad (41), Pathanamthitta (37), Thiruvananthapuram (274), Thrissur (86), Wayanad (14)	None	1004	29,151	PTP	
August-5	Alappuzha (108), Ernakulam (120), Idukki (39), Kannur (61), Kasargod (128), Kollam (30), Kottayam (51), Kozhikode (39), Malappuram (167), Palakkad (41), Pathanamthitta (37), Thiruvananthapuram (274), Thrissur (86), Wayanad (14)	Other states	125	29,151	T	
August-5	Alappuzha (108), Ernakulam (120), Idukki (39), Kannur (61), Kasargod (128), Kollam (30), Kottayam (51), Kozhikode (39), Malappuram (167), Palakkad (41), Pathanamthitta (37), Thiruvananthapuram (274), Thrissur (86), Wayanad (14)	Overseas	66	29,151	T	
August-6	Alappuzha (99), Ernakulam (73), Idukki (58), Kannur (33), Kasargod (153), Kollam (31), Kottayam (40), Kozhikode (174), Malappuram (129), Palakkad (136), Pathanamthitta (33), Thiruvananthapuram (219), Thrissur (74), Wayanad (46)	None	1050	30,449	PTP	
August-6	Alappuzha (99), Ernakulam (73), Idukki (58), Kannur (33), Kasargod (153), Kollam (31), Kottayam (40), Kozhikode (174), Malappuram (129), Palakkad (136), Pathanamthitta (33), Thiruvananthapuram (219), Thrissur (74), Wayanad (46)	Other states	170	30,449	T	
August-6	Alappuzha (99), Ernakulam (73), Idukki (58), Kannur (33), Kasargod (153), Kollam (31), Kottayam (40), Kozhikode (174), Malappuram (129), Palakkad (136), Pathanamthitta (33), Thiruvananthapuram (219), Thrissur (74), Wayanad (46)	Overseas	78	30,449	T	
August-7	Alappuzha (61), Ernakulam (82), Idukki (23), Kannur (13), Kasargod (168), Kollam (36), Kottayam (37), Kozhikode (149), Malappuram (143), Palakkad (123), Pathanamthitta (39), Thiruvananthapuram (289), Thrissur (33), Wayanad (55)	None	1080	31,699	PTP	
August-7	Alappuzha (61), Ernakulam (82), Idukki (23), Kannur (13), Kasargod (168), Kollam (36), Kottayam (37), Kozhikode (149), Malappuram (143), Palakkad (123), Pathanamthitta (39), Thiruvananthapuram (289), Thrissur (33), Wayanad (55)	Other states	94	31,699	T	
August-7	Alappuzha (61), Ernakulam (82), Idukki (23), Kannur (13), Kasargod (168), Kollam (36), Kottayam (37), Kozhikode (149), Malappuram (143), Palakkad (123), Pathanamthitta (39), Thiruvananthapuram (289), Thrissur (33), Wayanad (55)	Overseas	77	31,699	T	
August-8	Alappuzha (169), Ernakulam (101), Idukki (41), Kannur (57), Kasargod (73), Kollam (41), Kottayam (15), Kozhikode (173), Malappuram (114), Palakkad (39), Pathanamthitta (38), Thiruvananthapuram (485), Thrissur (64), Wayanad (10)	None	1252	33,120	PTP	
August-8	Alappuzha (169), Ernakulam (101), Idukki (41), Kannur (57), Kasargod (73), Kollam (41), Kottayam (15), Kozhikode (173), Malappuram (114), Palakkad (39), Pathanamthitta (38), Thiruvananthapuram (485), Thrissur (64), Wayanad (10)	Other states	108	33,120	T	
August-8	Alappuzha (169), Ernakulam (101), Idukki (41), Kannur (57), Kasargod (73), Kollam (41), Kottayam (15), Kozhikode (173), Malappuram (114), Palakkad (39), Pathanamthitta (38), Thiruvananthapuram (485), Thrissur (64), Wayanad (10)	Overseas	60	33,120	T	
August-9	Alappuzha (110), Ernakulam (54), Idukki (17), Kannur (41), Kasargod (56), Kollam (106), Kottayam (139), Kozhikode (69), Malappuram (170), Palakkad (78), Pathanamthitta (30), Thiruvananthapuram (292), Thrissur (24), Wayanad (25)	None	1057	34,331	PTP	
August-9	Alappuzha (110), Ernakulam (54), Idukki (17), Kannur (41), Kasargod (56), Kollam (106), Kottayam (139), Kozhikode (69), Malappuram (170), Palakkad (78), Pathanamthitta (30), Thiruvananthapuram (292), Thrissur (24), Wayanad (25)	Other states	78	34,331	T	
August-9	Alappuzha (110), Ernakulam (54), Idukki (17), Kannur (41), Kasargod (56), Kollam (106), Kottayam (139), Kozhikode (69), Malappuram (170), Palakkad (78), Pathanamthitta (30), Thiruvananthapuram (292), Thrissur (24), Wayanad (25)	Overseas	76	34,331	T	
August-10	Alappuzha (30), Ernakulam (101), Idukki (10), Kannur (63), Kasargod (146), Kollam (41), Kottayam (40), Kozhikode (66), Malappuram (255), Palakkad (147), Pathanamthitta (4), Thiruvananthapuram (200), Thrissur (40), Wayanad (33)	None	1005	35,514	PTP	
August-10	Alappuzha (30), Ernakulam (101), Idukki (10), Kannur (63), Kasargod (146), Kollam (41), Kottayam (40), Kozhikode (66), Malappuram (255), Palakkad (147), Pathanamthitta (4), Thiruvananthapuram (200), Thrissur (40), Wayanad (33)	Overseas	106	35,514	T	
August-10	Alappuzha (30), Ernakulam (101), Idukki (10), Kannur (63), Kasargod (146), Kollam (41), Kottayam (40), Kozhikode (66), Malappuram (255), Palakkad (147), Pathanamthitta (4), Thiruvananthapuram (200), Thrissur (40), Wayanad (33)	Other states	73	35,514	T	
August-11	Alappuzha (146), Ernakulam (133), Idukki (4), Kannur (30), Kasargod (147), Kollam (25), Kottayam (24), Kozhikode (158), Malappuram (242), Palakkad (141), Pathanamthitta (20), Thiruvananthapuram (297), Thrissur (32), Wayanad (18)	None	1283	36,931	PTP	
August-11	Alappuzha (146), Ernakulam (133), Idukki (4), Kannur (30), Kasargod (147), Kollam (25), Kottayam (24), Kozhikode (158), Malappuram (242), Palakkad (141), Pathanamthitta (20), Thiruvananthapuram (297), Thrissur (32), Wayanad (18)	Other states	72	36,931	T	
August-11	Alappuzha (146), Ernakulam (133), Idukki (4), Kannur (30), Kasargod (147), Kollam (25), Kottayam (24), Kozhikode (158), Malappuram (242), Palakkad (141), Pathanamthitta (20), Thiruvananthapuram (297), Thrissur (32), Wayanad (18)	Overseas	62	36,931	T	
August-12	Alappuzha (118), Ernakulam (121), Idukki (42), Kannur (31), Kasargod (68), Kollam (5), Kottayam (76), Kozhikode (93), Malappuram (261), Palakkad (81), Pathanamthitta (19), Thiruvananthapuram (266), Thrissur (19), Wayanad (12)	None	1097	38,144	PTP	
August-12	Alappuzha (118), Ernakulam (121), Idukki (42), Kannur (31), Kasargod (68), Kollam (5), Kottayam (76), Kozhikode (93), Malappuram (261), Palakkad (81), Pathanamthitta (19), Thiruvananthapuram (266), Thrissur (19), Wayanad (12)	Other states	64	38,144	T	
August-12	Alappuzha (118), Ernakulam (121), Idukki (42), Kannur (31), Kasargod (68), Kollam (5), Kottayam (76), Kozhikode (93), Malappuram (261), Palakkad (81), Pathanamthitta (19), Thiruvananthapuram (266), Thrissur (19), Wayanad (12)	Overseas	51	38,144	T	
August-13	Alappuzha (72), Ernakulam (115), Idukki (31), Kannur (27), Kasargod (79), Kollam (74), Kottayam (53), Kozhikode (98), Malappuram (202), Palakkad (202), Pathanamthitta (75), Thiruvananthapuram (434), Thrissur (75), Wayanad (27)	None	1404	39,708	PTP	
August-13	Alappuzha (72), Ernakulam (115), Idukki (31), Kannur (27), Kasargod (79), Kollam (74), Kottayam (53), Kozhikode (98), Malappuram (202), Palakkad (202), Pathanamthitta (75), Thiruvananthapuram (434), Thrissur (75), Wayanad (27)	Other states	100	39,708	T	
August-13	Alappuzha (72), Ernakulam (115), Idukki (31), Kannur (27), Kasargod (79), Kollam (74), Kottayam (53), Kozhikode (98), Malappuram (202), Palakkad (202), Pathanamthitta (75), Thiruvananthapuram (434), Thrissur (75), Wayanad (27)	Overseas	60	39,708	T	
August-14	Alappuzha (113), Ernakulam (114), Idukki (58), Kannur (95), Kasargod (49), Kollam (75), Kottayam (101), Kozhikode (99), Malappuram (198), Palakkad (180), Pathanamthitta (40), Thiruvananthapuram (310), Thrissur (80), Wayanad (57)	None	1381	41,277	PTP	
August-14	Alappuzha (113), Ernakulam (114), Idukki (58), Kannur (95), Kasargod (49), Kollam (75), Kottayam (101), Kozhikode (99), Malappuram (198), Palakkad (180), Pathanamthitta (40), Thiruvananthapuram (310), Thrissur (80), Wayanad (57)	Other states	132	41,277	T	
August-14	Alappuzha (113), Ernakulam (114), Idukki (58), Kannur (95), Kasargod (49), Kollam (75), Kottayam (101), Kozhikode (99), Malappuram (198), Palakkad (180), Pathanamthitta (40), Thiruvananthapuram (310), Thrissur (80), Wayanad (57)	Overseas	56	41,277	T	
August-15	Alappuzha (118), Ernakulam (106), Idukki (31), Kannur (52), Kasargod (81), Kollam (91), Kottayam (39), Kozhikode (151), Malappuram (362), Palakkad (74), Pathanamthitta (49), Thiruvananthapuram (321), Thrissur (85), Wayanad (48)	None	1444	42,885	PTP	
August-15	Alappuzha (118), Ernakulam (106), Idukki (31), Kannur (52), Kasargod (81), Kollam (91), Kottayam (39), Kozhikode (151), Malappuram (362), Palakkad (74), Pathanamthitta (49), Thiruvananthapuram (321), Thrissur (85), Wayanad (48)	Other states	90	42,885	T	
August-15	Alappuzha (118), Ernakulam (106), Idukki (31), Kannur (52), Kasargod (81), Kollam (91), Kottayam (39), Kozhikode (151), Malappuram (362), Palakkad (74), Pathanamthitta (49), Thiruvananthapuram (321), Thrissur (85), Wayanad (48)	Overseas	74	42,885	T	
August-16	Alappuzha (86), Ernakulam (123), Idukki (30), Kannur (52), Kasargod (48), Kollam (81), Kottayam (100), Kozhikode (118), Malappuram (221), Palakkad (29), Pathanamthitta (44), Thiruvananthapuram (519), Thrissur (30), Wayanad (49)	None	1404	44,415	PTP	
August-16	Alappuzha (86), Ernakulam (123), Idukki (30), Kannur (52), Kasargod (48), Kollam (81), Kottayam (100), Kozhikode (118), Malappuram (221), Palakkad (29), Pathanamthitta (44), Thiruvananthapuram (519), Thrissur (30), Wayanad (49)	Other states	89	44,415	T	
August-16	Alappuzha (86), Ernakulam (123), Idukki (30), Kannur (52), Kasargod (48), Kollam (81), Kottayam (100), Kozhikode (118), Malappuram (221), Palakkad (29), Pathanamthitta (44), Thiruvananthapuram (519), Thrissur (30), Wayanad (49)	Overseas	37	44,415	T	
August-17	Alappuzha (139), Ernakulam (129), Idukki (23), Kannur (77), Kasargod (97), Kollam (48), Kottayam (89), Kozhikode (46), Malappuram (306), Palakkad (137), Pathanamthitta (2), Thiruvananthapuram (461), Thrissur (156), Wayanad (15)	None	1605	46,140	PTP	
August-17	Alappuzha (139), Ernakulam (129), Idukki (23), Kannur (77), Kasargod (97), Kollam (48), Kottayam (89), Kozhikode (46), Malappuram (306), Palakkad (137), Pathanamthitta (2), Thiruvananthapuram (461), Thrissur (156), Wayanad (15)	Other states	75	46,140	T	
August-17	Alappuzha (139), Ernakulam (129), Idukki (23), Kannur (77), Kasargod (97), Kollam (48), Kottayam (89), Kozhikode (46), Malappuram (306), Palakkad (137), Pathanamthitta (2), Thiruvananthapuram (461), Thrissur (156), Wayanad (15)	Overseas	45	46,140	T	
August-18	Alappuzha (126), Ernakulam (192), Idukki (5), Kannur (123), Kasargod (42), Kollam (88), Kottayam (93), Kozhikode (147), Malappuram (242), Palakkad (51), Pathanamthitta (65), Thiruvananthapuram (489), Thrissur (48), Wayanad (47)	None	1677	47,898	PTP	
August-18	Alappuzha (126), Ernakulam (192), Idukki (5), Kannur (123), Kasargod (42), Kollam (88), Kottayam (93), Kozhikode (147), Malappuram (242), Palakkad (51), Pathanamthitta (65), Thiruvananthapuram (489), Thrissur (48), Wayanad (47)	Other states	42	47,898	T	
August-18	Alappuzha (126), Ernakulam (192), Idukki (5), Kannur (123), Kasargod (42), Kollam (88), Kottayam (93), Kozhikode (147), Malappuram (242), Palakkad (51), Pathanamthitta (65), Thiruvananthapuram (489), Thrissur (48), Wayanad (47)	Overseas	39	47,898	T	
August-19	Alappuzha (253), Ernakulam (230), Idukki (64), Kannur (126), Kasargod (174), Kollam (77), Kottayam (203), Kozhikode (78), Malappuram (322), Palakkad (65), Pathanamthitta (87), Thiruvananthapuram (540), Thrissur (97), Wayanad (17)	None	2175	50,231	PTP	
August-19	Alappuzha (253), Ernakulam (230), Idukki (64), Kannur (126), Kasargod (174), Kollam (77), Kottayam (203), Kozhikode (78), Malappuram (322), Palakkad (65), Pathanamthitta (87), Thiruvananthapuram (540), Thrissur (97), Wayanad (17)	Other states	98	50,231	T	
August-19	Alappuzha (253), Ernakulam (230), Idukki (64), Kannur (126), Kasargod (174), Kollam (77), Kottayam (203), Kozhikode (78), Malappuram (322), Palakkad (65), Pathanamthitta (87), Thiruvananthapuram (540), Thrissur (97), Wayanad (17)	Overseas	60	50,231	T	
August-20	Alappuzha (198), Ernakulam (150), Idukki (35), Kannur (78), Kasargod (91), Kollam (86), Kottayam (124), Kozhikode (130), Malappuram (356), Palakkad (65), Pathanamthitta (119), Thiruvananthapuram (429), Thrissur (72), Wayanad (35)	None	1788	52,199	PTP	
August-20	Alappuzha (198), Ernakulam (150), Idukki (35), Kannur (78), Kasargod (91), Kollam (86), Kottayam (124), Kozhikode (130), Malappuram (356), Palakkad (65), Pathanamthitta (119), Thiruvananthapuram (429), Thrissur (72), Wayanad (35)	Other states	109	52,199	T	
August-20	Alappuzha (198), Ernakulam (150), Idukki (35), Kannur (78), Kasargod (91), Kollam (86), Kottayam (124), Kozhikode (130), Malappuram (356), Palakkad (65), Pathanamthitta (119), Thiruvananthapuram (429), Thrissur (72), Wayanad (35)	Overseas	71	52,199	T	
August-21	Alappuzha (155), Ernakulam (165), Idukki (34), Kannur (78), Kasargod (105), Kollam (82), Kottayam (136), Kozhikode (158), Malappuram (335), Palakkad (83), Pathanamthitta (78), Thiruvananthapuram (429), Thrissur (119), Wayanad (26)	None	1830	54,182	PTP	
August-21	Alappuzha (155), Ernakulam (165), Idukki (34), Kannur (78), Kasargod (105), Kollam (82), Kottayam (136), Kozhikode (158), Malappuram (335), Palakkad (83), Pathanamthitta (78), Thiruvananthapuram (429), Thrissur (119), Wayanad (26)	Other states	99	54,182	T	
August-21	Alappuzha (155), Ernakulam (165), Idukki (34), Kannur (78), Kasargod (105), Kollam (82), Kottayam (136), Kozhikode (158), Malappuram (335), Palakkad (83), Pathanamthitta (78), Thiruvananthapuram (429), Thrissur (119), Wayanad (26)	Overseas	64	54,182	T	
August-22	Alappuzha (87), Ernakulam (114), Idukki (37), Kannur (62), Kasargod (119), Kollam (77), Kottayam (104), Kozhikode (232), Malappuram (395), Palakkad (184), Pathanamthitta (93), Thiruvananthapuram (464), Thrissur (179), Wayanad (25)	None	2018	56,354	PTP	
August-22	Alappuzha (87), Ernakulam (114), Idukki (37), Kannur (62), Kasargod (119), Kollam (77), Kottayam (104), Kozhikode (232), Malappuram (395), Palakkad (184), Pathanamthitta (93), Thiruvananthapuram (464), Thrissur (179), Wayanad (25)	Other states	102	56,354	T	
August-22	Alappuzha (87), Ernakulam (114), Idukki (37), Kannur (62), Kasargod (119), Kollam (77), Kottayam (104), Kozhikode (232), Malappuram (395), Palakkad (184), Pathanamthitta (93), Thiruvananthapuram (464), Thrissur (179), Wayanad (25)	Overseas	52	56,354	T	
August-23	Alappuzha (241), Ernakulam (200), Idukki (29), Kannur (143), Kasargod (85), Kollam (133), Kottayam (106), Kozhikode (119), Malappuram (186), Palakkad (39), Pathanamthitta (104), Thiruvananthapuram (397), Thrissur (116), Wayanad (10)	None	2018	58,262	PTP	
August-23	Alappuzha (241), Ernakulam (200), Idukki (29), Kannur (143), Kasargod (85), Kollam (133), Kottayam (106), Kozhikode (119), Malappuram (186), Palakkad (39), Pathanamthitta (104), Thiruvananthapuram (397), Thrissur (116), Wayanad (10)	Other states	105	58,262	T	
August-23	Alappuzha (241), Ernakulam (200), Idukki (29), Kannur (143), Kasargod (85), Kollam (133), Kottayam (106), Kozhikode (119), Malappuram (186), Palakkad (39), Pathanamthitta (104), Thiruvananthapuram (397), Thrissur (116), Wayanad (10)	Overseas	35	58,262	T	
August-24	Alappuzha (60), Ernakulam (165), Idukki (19), Kannur (76), Kasargod (118), Kollam (112), Kottayam (89), Kozhikode (81), Malappuram (169), Palakkad (99), Pathanamthitta (6), Thiruvananthapuram (182), Thrissur (46), Wayanad (20)	None	1115	59,504	PTP	
August-24	Alappuzha (60), Ernakulam (165), Idukki (19), Kannur (76), Kasargod (118), Kollam (112), Kottayam (89), Kozhikode (81), Malappuram (169), Palakkad (99), Pathanamthitta (6), Thiruvananthapuram (182), Thrissur (46), Wayanad (20)	Other states	88	59,504	T	
August-24	Alappuzha (60), Ernakulam (165), Idukki (19), Kannur (76), Kasargod (118), Kollam (112), Kottayam (89), Kozhikode (81), Malappuram (169), Palakkad (99), Pathanamthitta (6), Thiruvananthapuram (182), Thrissur (46), Wayanad (20)	Overseas	39	59,504	T	
August-25	Alappuzha (170), Ernakulam (163), Idukki (6), Kannur (150), Kasargod (99), Kollam (87), Kottayam (86), Kozhikode (260), Malappuram (454), Palakkad (152), Pathanamthitta (93), Thiruvananthapuram (391), Thrissur (227), Wayanad (37)	None	2196	61,879	PTP	
August-25	Alappuzha (170), Ernakulam (163), Idukki (6), Kannur (150), Kasargod (99), Kollam (87), Kottayam (86), Kozhikode (260), Malappuram (454), Palakkad (152), Pathanamthitta (93), Thiruvananthapuram (391), Thrissur (227), Wayanad (37)	Other states	118	61,879	T	
August-25	Alappuzha (170), Ernakulam (163), Idukki (6), Kannur (150), Kasargod (99), Kollam (87), Kottayam (86), Kozhikode (260), Malappuram (454), Palakkad (152), Pathanamthitta (93), Thiruvananthapuram (391), Thrissur (227), Wayanad (37)	Overseas	61	61,879	T	
August-26	Alappuzha (193), Ernakulam (193), Idukki (63), Kannur (128), Kasargod (101), Kollam (133), Kottayam (137), Kozhikode (215), Malappuram (352), Palakkad (86), Pathanamthitta (180), Thiruvananthapuram (461), Thrissur (204), Wayanad (30)	None	2313	64,355	PTP	
August-26	Alappuzha (193), Ernakulam (193), Idukki (63), Kannur (128), Kasargod (101), Kollam (133), Kottayam (137), Kozhikode (215), Malappuram (352), Palakkad (86), Pathanamthitta (180), Thiruvananthapuram (461), Thrissur (204), Wayanad (30)	Other states	99	64,355	T	
August-26	Alappuzha (193), Ernakulam (193), Idukki (63), Kannur (128), Kasargod (101), Kollam (133), Kottayam (137), Kozhikode (215), Malappuram (352), Palakkad (86), Pathanamthitta (180), Thiruvananthapuram (461), Thrissur (204), Wayanad (30)	Overseas	64	64,355	T	
August-27	Alappuzha (172), Ernakulam (140), Idukki (27), Kannur (102), Kasargod (231), Kollam (176), Kottayam (189), Kozhikode (238), Malappuram (230), Palakkad (195), Pathanamthitta (167), Thiruvananthapuram (352), Thrissur (162), Wayanad (25)	None	2226	66,761	PTP	
August-27	Alappuzha (172), Ernakulam (140), Idukki (27), Kannur (102), Kasargod (231), Kollam (176), Kottayam (189), Kozhikode (238), Malappuram (230), Palakkad (195), Pathanamthitta (167), Thiruvananthapuram (352), Thrissur (162), Wayanad (25)	Other states	121	66,761	T	
August-27	Alappuzha (172), Ernakulam (140), Idukki (27), Kannur (102), Kasargod (231), Kollam (176), Kottayam (189), Kozhikode (238), Malappuram (230), Palakkad (195), Pathanamthitta (167), Thiruvananthapuram (352), Thrissur (162), Wayanad (25)	Overseas	59	66,761	T	
August-28	Alappuzha (286), Ernakulam (207), Idukki (49), Kannur (135), Kasargod (157), Kollam (156), Kottayam (126), Kozhikode (174), Malappuram (298), Palakkad (127), Pathanamthitta (88), Thiruvananthapuram (532), Thrissur (189), Wayanad (19)	None	2312	69,304	PTP	
August-28	Alappuzha (286), Ernakulam (207), Idukki (49), Kannur (135), Kasargod (157), Kollam (156), Kottayam (126), Kozhikode (174), Malappuram (298), Palakkad (127), Pathanamthitta (88), Thiruvananthapuram (532), Thrissur (189), Wayanad (19)	Other states	156	69,304	T	
August-28	Alappuzha (286), Ernakulam (207), Idukki (49), Kannur (135), Kasargod (157), Kollam (156), Kottayam (126), Kozhikode (174), Malappuram (298), Palakkad (127), Pathanamthitta (88), Thiruvananthapuram (532), Thrissur (189), Wayanad (19)	Overseas	75	69,304	T	
August-29	Alappuzha (175), Ernakulam (136), Idukki (27), Kannur (95), Kasargod (198), Kollam (234), Kottayam (139), Kozhikode (152), Malappuram (379), Palakkad (133), Pathanamthitta (75), Thiruvananthapuram (408), Thrissur (225), Wayanad (21)	None	2203	71,701	PTP	
August-29	Alappuzha (175), Ernakulam (136), Idukki (27), Kannur (95), Kasargod (198), Kollam (234), Kottayam (139), Kozhikode (152), Malappuram (379), Palakkad (133), Pathanamthitta (75), Thiruvananthapuram (408), Thrissur (225), Wayanad (21)	Other states	156	71,701	T	
August-29	Alappuzha (175), Ernakulam (136), Idukki (27), Kannur (95), Kasargod (198), Kollam (234), Kottayam (139), Kozhikode (152), Malappuram (379), Palakkad (133), Pathanamthitta (75), Thiruvananthapuram (408), Thrissur (225), Wayanad (21)	Overseas	75	71,701	T	
August-30	Alappuzha (92), Ernakulam (231), Idukki (35), Kannur (112), Kasargod (159), Kollam (151), Kottayam (223), Kozhikode (304), Malappuram (195), Palakkad (45), Pathanamthitta (133), Thiruvananthapuram (310), Thrissur (151), Wayanad (13)	None	1995	73,855	PTP	
August-30	Alappuzha (92), Ernakulam (231), Idukki (35), Kannur (112), Kasargod (159), Kollam (151), Kottayam (223), Kozhikode (304), Malappuram (195), Palakkad (45), Pathanamthitta (133), Thiruvananthapuram (310), Thrissur (151), Wayanad (13)	Other states	110	73,855	T	
August-30	Alappuzha (92), Ernakulam (231), Idukki (35), Kannur (112), Kasargod (159), Kollam (151), Kottayam (223), Kozhikode (304), Malappuram (195), Palakkad (45), Pathanamthitta (133), Thiruvananthapuram (310), Thrissur (151), Wayanad (13)	Overseas	49	73,855	T	
August-31	Alappuzha (137), Ernakulam (210), Idukki (15), Kannur (74), Kasargod (103), Kollam (131), Kottayam (86), Kozhikode (117), Malappuram (177), Palakkad (42), Pathanamthitta (107), Thiruvananthapuram (221), Thrissur (85), Wayanad (25)	None	1396	75,385	PTP	
August-31	Alappuzha (137), Ernakulam (210), Idukki (15), Kannur (74), Kasargod (103), Kollam (131), Kottayam (86), Kozhikode (117), Malappuram (177), Palakkad (42), Pathanamthitta (107), Thiruvananthapuram (221), Thrissur (85), Wayanad (25)	Other states	80	75,385	T	
August-31	Alappuzha (137), Ernakulam (210), Idukki (15), Kannur (74), Kasargod (103), Kollam (131), Kottayam (86), Kozhikode (117), Malappuram (177), Palakkad (42), Pathanamthitta (107), Thiruvananthapuram (221), Thrissur (85), Wayanad (25)	Overseas	54	75,385	T	
September-1	Alappuzha (32), Ernakulam (161), Kannur (77), Kasargod (15), Kollam (25), Kottayam (62), Kozhikode (155), Malappuram (191), Palakkad (42), Pathanamthitta (12), Thiruvananthapuram (227), Thrissur (133), Wayanad (8)	None	1090	76,525	PTP	
September-1	Alappuzha (32), Ernakulam (161), Kannur (77), Kasargod (15), Kollam (25), Kottayam (62), Kozhikode (155), Malappuram (191), Palakkad (42), Pathanamthitta (12), Thiruvananthapuram (227), Thrissur (133), Wayanad (8)	Other states	36	76,525	T	
September-1	Alappuzha (32), Ernakulam (161), Kannur (77), Kasargod (15), Kollam (25), Kottayam (62), Kozhikode (155), Malappuram (191), Palakkad (42), Pathanamthitta (12), Thiruvananthapuram (227), Thrissur (133), Wayanad (8)	Overseas	14	76,525	T	
September-2	Alappuzha (159), Ernakulam (136), Idukki (12), Kannur (142), Kasargod (88), Kollam (81), Kottayam (145), Kozhikode (204), Malappuram (146), Palakkad (30), Pathanamthitta (17), Thiruvananthapuram (228), Thrissur (121), Wayanad (38)	None	1461	78,072	PTP	
September-2	Alappuzha (159), Ernakulam (136), Idukki (12), Kannur (142), Kasargod (88), Kollam (81), Kottayam (145), Kozhikode (204), Malappuram (146), Palakkad (30), Pathanamthitta (17), Thiruvananthapuram (228), Thrissur (121), Wayanad (38)	Other states	65	78,072	T	
September-2	Alappuzha (159), Ernakulam (136), Idukki (12), Kannur (142), Kasargod (88), Kollam (81), Kottayam (145), Kozhikode (204), Malappuram (146), Palakkad (30), Pathanamthitta (17), Thiruvananthapuram (228), Thrissur (121), Wayanad (38)	Overseas	21	78,072	T	
September-3	Alappuzha (87), Ernakulam (164), Idukki (44), Kannur (74), Kasargod (133), Kollam (65), Kottayam (160), Kozhikode (131), Malappuram (91), Palakkad (58), Pathanamthitta (118), Thiruvananthapuram (317), Thrissur (93), Wayanad (18)	None	1435	79,625	PTP	
September-3	Alappuzha (87), Ernakulam (164), Idukki (44), Kannur (74), Kasargod (133), Kollam (65), Kottayam (160), Kozhikode (131), Malappuram (91), Palakkad (58), Pathanamthitta (118), Thiruvananthapuram (317), Thrissur (93), Wayanad (18)	Other states	90	79,625	T	
September-3	Alappuzha (87), Ernakulam (164), Idukki (44), Kannur (74), Kasargod (133), Kollam (65), Kottayam (160), Kozhikode (131), Malappuram (91), Palakkad (58), Pathanamthitta (118), Thiruvananthapuram (317), Thrissur (93), Wayanad (18)	Overseas	28	79,625	T	
September-4	Alappuzha (106), Ernakulam (274), Idukki (29), Kannur (115), Kasargod (236), Kollam (248), Kottayam (178), Kozhikode (167), Malappuram (178), Palakkad (42), Pathanamthitta (141), Thiruvananthapuram (477), Thrissur (204), Wayanad (84)	None	2349	82,104	PTP	
September-4	Alappuzha (106), Ernakulam (274), Idukki (29), Kannur (115), Kasargod (236), Kollam (248), Kottayam (178), Kozhikode (167), Malappuram (178), Palakkad (42), Pathanamthitta (141), Thiruvananthapuram (477), Thrissur (204), Wayanad (84)	Other states	71	82,104	T	
September-4	Alappuzha (106), Ernakulam (274), Idukki (29), Kannur (115), Kasargod (236), Kollam (248), Kottayam (178), Kozhikode (167), Malappuram (178), Palakkad (42), Pathanamthitta (141), Thiruvananthapuram (477), Thrissur (204), Wayanad (84)	Overseas	59	82,104	T	
September-5	Alappuzha (131), Ernakulam (186), Idukki (31), Kannur (222), Kasargod (276), Kollam (170), Kottayam (119), Kozhikode (244), Malappuram (249), Palakkad (100), Pathanamthitta (148), Thiruvananthapuram (590), Thrissur (169), Wayanad (20)	None	2503	84,759	PTP	
September-5	Alappuzha (131), Ernakulam (186), Idukki (31), Kannur (222), Kasargod (276), Kollam (170), Kottayam (119), Kozhikode (244), Malappuram (249), Palakkad (100), Pathanamthitta (148), Thiruvananthapuram (590), Thrissur (169), Wayanad (20)	Other states	114	84,759	T	
September-5	Alappuzha (131), Ernakulam (186), Idukki (31), Kannur (222), Kasargod (276), Kollam (170), Kottayam (119), Kozhikode (244), Malappuram (249), Palakkad (100), Pathanamthitta (148), Thiruvananthapuram (590), Thrissur (169), Wayanad (20)	Overseas	38	84,759	T	
September-6	Alappuzha (221), Ernakulam (281), Idukki (39), Kannur (200), Kasargod (218), Kollam (328), Kottayam (195), Kozhikode (264), Malappuram (324), Palakkad (162), Pathanamthitta (113), Thiruvananthapuram (528), Thrissur (169), Wayanad (40)	None	2894	87,841	PTP	
September-6	Alappuzha (221), Ernakulam (281), Idukki (39), Kannur (200), Kasargod (218), Kollam (328), Kottayam (195), Kozhikode (264), Malappuram (324), Palakkad (162), Pathanamthitta (113), Thiruvananthapuram (528), Thrissur (169), Wayanad (40)	Other states	132	87,841	T	
September-6	Alappuzha (221), Ernakulam (281), Idukki (39), Kannur (200), Kasargod (218), Kollam (328), Kottayam (195), Kozhikode (264), Malappuram (324), Palakkad (162), Pathanamthitta (113), Thiruvananthapuram (528), Thrissur (169), Wayanad (40)	Overseas	56	87,841	T	
September-7	Alappuzha (78), Ernakulam (130), Idukki (4), Kannur (260), Kasargod (134), Kollam (71), Kottayam (154), Kozhikode (103), Malappuram (187), Palakkad (118), Pathanamthitta (24), Thiruvananthapuram (253), Thrissur (128), Wayanad (4)	None	1565	87,841	PTP	
September-7	Alappuzha (78), Ernakulam (130), Idukki (4), Kannur (260), Kasargod (134), Kollam (71), Kottayam (154), Kozhikode (103), Malappuram (187), Palakkad (118), Pathanamthitta (24), Thiruvananthapuram (253), Thrissur (128), Wayanad (4)	Other states	54	87,841	T	
September-7	Alappuzha (78), Ernakulam (130), Idukki (4), Kannur (260), Kasargod (134), Kollam (71), Kottayam (154), Kozhikode (103), Malappuram (187), Palakkad (118), Pathanamthitta (24), Thiruvananthapuram (253), Thrissur (128), Wayanad (4)	Overseas	29	87,841	T	
September-8	Alappuzha (217), Ernakulam (318), Idukki (85), Kannur (158), Kasargod (166), Kollam (209), Kottayam (168), Kozhikode (246), Malappuram (358), Palakkad (226), Pathanamthitta (160), Thiruvananthapuram (562), Thrissur (129), Wayanad (24)	None	2814	92,515	PTP	
September-8	Alappuzha (217), Ernakulam (318), Idukki (85), Kannur (158), Kasargod (166), Kollam (209), Kottayam (168), Kozhikode (246), Malappuram (358), Palakkad (226), Pathanamthitta (160), Thiruvananthapuram (562), Thrissur (129), Wayanad (24)	Other states	163	92,515	T	
September-8	Alappuzha (217), Ernakulam (318), Idukki (85), Kannur (158), Kasargod (166), Kollam (209), Kottayam (168), Kozhikode (246), Malappuram (358), Palakkad (226), Pathanamthitta (160), Thiruvananthapuram (562), Thrissur (129), Wayanad (24)	Overseas	49	92,515	T	
September-9	Alappuzha (240), Ernakulam (276), Idukki (24), Kannur (251), Kasargod (270), Kollam (362), Kottayam (196), Kozhikode (330), Malappuram (201), Palakkad (131), Pathanamthitta (190), Thiruvananthapuram (531), Thrissur (323), Wayanad (77)	None	3223	95,917	PTP	
September-9	Alappuzha (240), Ernakulam (276), Idukki (24), Kannur (251), Kasargod (270), Kollam (362), Kottayam (196), Kozhikode (330), Malappuram (201), Palakkad (131), Pathanamthitta (190), Thiruvananthapuram (531), Thrissur (323), Wayanad (77)	Other states	133	95,917	T	
September-9	Alappuzha (240), Ernakulam (276), Idukki (24), Kannur (251), Kasargod (270), Kollam (362), Kottayam (196), Kozhikode (330), Malappuram (201), Palakkad (131), Pathanamthitta (190), Thiruvananthapuram (531), Thrissur (323), Wayanad (77)	Overseas	46	95,917	T	
September-10	Alappuzha (267), Ernakulam (227), Idukki (105), Kannur (276), Kasargod (140), Kollam (244), Kottayam (217), Kozhikode (261), Malappuram (330), Palakkad (194), Pathanamthitta (135), Thiruvananthapuram (558), Thrissur (300), Wayanad (95)	None	3134	99,266	PTP	
September-10	Alappuzha (267), Ernakulam (227), Idukki (105), Kannur (276), Kasargod (140), Kollam (244), Kottayam (217), Kozhikode (261), Malappuram (330), Palakkad (194), Pathanamthitta (135), Thiruvananthapuram (558), Thrissur (300), Wayanad (95)	Other states	165	99,266	T	
September-10	Alappuzha (267), Ernakulam (227), Idukki (105), Kannur (276), Kasargod (140), Kollam (244), Kottayam (217), Kozhikode (261), Malappuram (330), Palakkad (194), Pathanamthitta (135), Thiruvananthapuram (558), Thrissur (300), Wayanad (95)	Overseas	50	99,266	T	
September-11	Alappuzha (200), Ernakulam (295), Idukki (28), Kannur (256), Kasargod (102), Kollam (303), Kottayam (221), Kozhikode (261), Malappuram (390), Palakkad (109), Pathanamthitta (93), Thiruvananthapuram (494), Thrissur (184), Wayanad (52)	None	2809	1,02,254	PTP	
September-11	Alappuzha (200), Ernakulam (295), Idukki (28), Kannur (256), Kasargod (102), Kollam (303), Kottayam (221), Kozhikode (261), Malappuram (390), Palakkad (109), Pathanamthitta (93), Thiruvananthapuram (494), Thrissur (184), Wayanad (52)	Other states	134	1,02,254	T	
September-11	Alappuzha (200), Ernakulam (295), Idukki (28), Kannur (256), Kasargod (102), Kollam (303), Kottayam (221), Kozhikode (261), Malappuram (390), Palakkad (109), Pathanamthitta (93), Thiruvananthapuram (494), Thrissur (184), Wayanad (52)	Overseas	45	1,02,254	T	
September-12	Alappuzha (163), Ernakulam (188), Idukki (86), Kannur (207), Kasargod (150), Kollam (265), Kottayam (166), Kozhikode (286), Malappuram (310), Palakkad (184), Pathanamthitta (88), Thiruvananthapuram (566), Thrissur (172), Wayanad (54)	None	2706	1,05,139	PTP	
September-12	Alappuzha (163), Ernakulam (188), Idukki (86), Kannur (207), Kasargod (150), Kollam (265), Kottayam (166), Kozhikode (286), Malappuram (310), Palakkad (184), Pathanamthitta (88), Thiruvananthapuram (566), Thrissur (172), Wayanad (54)	Other states	137	1,05,139	T	
September-12	Alappuzha (163), Ernakulam (188), Idukki (86), Kannur (207), Kasargod (150), Kollam (265), Kottayam (166), Kozhikode (286), Malappuram (310), Palakkad (184), Pathanamthitta (88), Thiruvananthapuram (566), Thrissur (172), Wayanad (54)	Overseas	42	1,05,139	T	
September-13	Alappuzha (252), Ernakulam (326), Idukki (40), Kannur (234), Kasargod (124), Kollam (205), Kottayam (196), Kozhikode (399), Malappuram (378), Palakkad (233), Pathanamthitta (102), Thiruvananthapuram (412), Thrissur (182), Wayanad (56)	None	2977	1,08,278	PTP	
September-13	Alappuzha (252), Ernakulam (326), Idukki (40), Kannur (234), Kasargod (124), Kollam (205), Kottayam (196), Kozhikode (399), Malappuram (378), Palakkad (233), Pathanamthitta (102), Thiruvananthapuram (412), Thrissur (182), Wayanad (56)	Other states	126	1,08,278	T	
September-13	Alappuzha (252), Ernakulam (326), Idukki (40), Kannur (234), Kasargod (124), Kollam (205), Kottayam (196), Kozhikode (399), Malappuram (378), Palakkad (233), Pathanamthitta (102), Thiruvananthapuram (412), Thrissur (182), Wayanad (56)	Overseas	36	1,08,278	T	
September-14	Alappuzha (107), Ernakulam (255), Idukki (58), Kannur (232), Kasargod (56), Kollam (142), Kottayam (122), Kozhikode (382), Malappuram (482), Palakkad (175), Pathanamthitta (16), Thiruvananthapuram (332), Thrissur (161), Wayanad (20)	None	2433	1,10,818	PTP	
September-14	Alappuzha (107), Ernakulam (255), Idukki (58), Kannur (232), Kasargod (56), Kollam (142), Kottayam (122), Kozhikode (382), Malappuram (482), Palakkad (175), Pathanamthitta (16), Thiruvananthapuram (332), Thrissur (161), Wayanad (20)	Other states	73	1,10,818	T	
September-14	Alappuzha (107), Ernakulam (255), Idukki (58), Kannur (232), Kasargod (56), Kollam (142), Kottayam (122), Kozhikode (382), Malappuram (482), Palakkad (175), Pathanamthitta (16), Thiruvananthapuram (332), Thrissur (161), Wayanad (20)	Overseas	34	1,10,818	T	
September-15	Alappuzha (338), Ernakulam (239), Idukki (29), Kannur (213), Kasargod (172), Kollam (234), Kottayam (192), Kozhikode (260), Malappuram (348), Palakkad (136), Pathanamthitta (146), Thiruvananthapuram (656), Thrissur (188), Wayanad (64)	None	3102	1,14,033	PTP	
September-15	Alappuzha (338), Ernakulam (239), Idukki (29), Kannur (213), Kasargod (172), Kollam (234), Kottayam (192), Kozhikode (260), Malappuram (348), Palakkad (136), Pathanamthitta (146), Thiruvananthapuram (656), Thrissur (188), Wayanad (64)	Other states	70	1,14,033	T	
September-15	Alappuzha (338), Ernakulam (239), Idukki (29), Kannur (213), Kasargod (172), Kollam (234), Kottayam (192), Kozhikode (260), Malappuram (348), Palakkad (136), Pathanamthitta (146), Thiruvananthapuram (656), Thrissur (188), Wayanad (64)	Overseas	43	1,14,033	T	
September-16	Alappuzha (323), Ernakulam (319), Idukki (76), Kannur (247), Kasargod (119), Kollam (300), Kottayam (187), Kozhikode (468), Malappuram (298), Palakkad (220), Pathanamthitta (236), Thiruvananthapuram (675), Thrissur (263), Wayanad (99)	None	3628	1,17,863	PTP	
September-16	Alappuzha (323), Ernakulam (319), Idukki (76), Kannur (247), Kasargod (119), Kollam (300), Kottayam (187), Kozhikode (468), Malappuram (298), Palakkad (220), Pathanamthitta (236), Thiruvananthapuram (675), Thrissur (263), Wayanad (99)	Other states	153	1,17,863	T	
September-16	Alappuzha (323), Ernakulam (319), Idukki (76), Kannur (247), Kasargod (119), Kollam (300), Kottayam (187), Kozhikode (468), Malappuram (298), Palakkad (220), Pathanamthitta (236), Thiruvananthapuram (675), Thrissur (263), Wayanad (99)	Overseas	49	1,17,863	T	
September-17	Alappuzha (367), Ernakulam (383), Idukki (104), Kannur (260), Kasargod (319), Kollam (218), Kottayam (204), Kozhikode (545), Malappuram (351), Palakkad (241), Pathanamthitta (136), Thiruvananthapuram (820), Thrissur (296), Wayanad (107)	None	4333	1,22,394	PTP	
September-17	Alappuzha (367), Ernakulam (383), Idukki (104), Kannur (260), Kasargod (319), Kollam (218), Kottayam (204), Kozhikode (545), Malappuram (351), Palakkad (241), Pathanamthitta (136), Thiruvananthapuram (820), Thrissur (296), Wayanad (107)	Other states	141	1,22,394	T	
September-17	Alappuzha (367), Ernakulam (383), Idukki (104), Kannur (260), Kasargod (319), Kollam (218), Kottayam (204), Kozhikode (545), Malappuram (351), Palakkad (241), Pathanamthitta (136), Thiruvananthapuram (820), Thrissur (296), Wayanad (107)	Overseas	57	1,22,394	T	
September-18	Alappuzha (274), Ernakulam (348), Idukki (100), Kannur (330), Kasargod (145), Kollam (355), Kottayam (225), Kozhikode (404), Malappuram (297), Palakkad (268), Pathanamthitta (101), Thiruvananthapuram (926), Thrissur (326), Wayanad (68)	None	3954	1,26,561	PTP	
September-18	Alappuzha (274), Ernakulam (348), Idukki (100), Kannur (330), Kasargod (145), Kollam (355), Kottayam (225), Kozhikode (404), Malappuram (297), Palakkad (268), Pathanamthitta (101), Thiruvananthapuram (926), Thrissur (326), Wayanad (68)	Other states	165	1,26,561	T	
September-18	Alappuzha (274), Ernakulam (348), Idukki (100), Kannur (330), Kasargod (145), Kollam (355), Kottayam (225), Kozhikode (404), Malappuram (297), Palakkad (268), Pathanamthitta (101), Thiruvananthapuram (926), Thrissur (326), Wayanad (68)	Overseas	48	1,26,561	T	
September-19	Alappuzha (348), Ernakulam (351), Idukki (47), Kannur (222), Kasargod (191), Kollam (436), Kottayam (263), Kozhikode (412), Malappuram (534), Palakkad (349), Pathanamthitta (221), Thiruvananthapuram (824), Thrissur (351), Wayanad (95)	None	4379	1,31,205	PTP	
September-19	Alappuzha (348), Ernakulam (351), Idukki (47), Kannur (222), Kasargod (191), Kollam (436), Kottayam (263), Kozhikode (412), Malappuram (534), Palakkad (349), Pathanamthitta (221), Thiruvananthapuram (824), Thrissur (351), Wayanad (95)	Other states	229	1,31,205	T	
September-19	Alappuzha (348), Ernakulam (351), Idukki (47), Kannur (222), Kasargod (191), Kollam (436), Kottayam (263), Kozhikode (412), Malappuram (534), Palakkad (349), Pathanamthitta (221), Thiruvananthapuram (824), Thrissur (351), Wayanad (95)	Overseas	36	1,31,205	T	
September-20	Alappuzha (219), Ernakulam (537), Idukki (77), Kannur (242), Kasargod (208), Kollam (330), Kottayam (274), Kozhikode (536), Malappuram (483), Palakkad (289), Pathanamthitta (190), Thiruvananthapuram (892), Thrissur (322), Wayanad (97)	None	4515	1,35,901	PTP	
September-20	Alappuzha (219), Ernakulam (537), Idukki (77), Kannur (242), Kasargod (208), Kollam (330), Kottayam (274), Kozhikode (536), Malappuram (483), Palakkad (289), Pathanamthitta (190), Thiruvananthapuram (892), Thrissur (322), Wayanad (97)	Other states	137	1,35,901	T	
September-20	Alappuzha (219), Ernakulam (537), Idukki (77), Kannur (242), Kasargod (208), Kollam (330), Kottayam (274), Kozhikode (536), Malappuram (483), Palakkad (289), Pathanamthitta (190), Thiruvananthapuram (892), Thrissur (322), Wayanad (97)	Overseas	44	1,35,901	T	
September-21	Alappuzha (112), Ernakulam (299), Idukki (82), Kannur (314), Kasargod (110), Kollam (195), Kottayam (156), Kozhikode (376), Malappuram (349), Palakkad (167), Pathanamthitta (18), Thiruvananthapuram (533), Thrissur (183), Wayanad (18)	None	2741	1,38,811	PTP	
September-21	Alappuzha (112), Ernakulam (299), Idukki (82), Kannur (314), Kasargod (110), Kollam (195), Kottayam (156), Kozhikode (376), Malappuram (349), Palakkad (167), Pathanamthitta (18), Thiruvananthapuram (533), Thrissur (183), Wayanad (18)	Other states	133	1,38,811	T	
September-21	Alappuzha (112), Ernakulam (299), Idukki (82), Kannur (314), Kasargod (110), Kollam (195), Kottayam (156), Kozhikode (376), Malappuram (349), Palakkad (167), Pathanamthitta (18), Thiruvananthapuram (533), Thrissur (183), Wayanad (18)	Overseas	36	1,38,811	T	
September-22	Alappuzha (403), Ernakulam (406), Idukki (42), Kannur (143), Kasargod (197), Kollam (347), Kottayam (169), Kozhikode (394), Malappuram (444), Palakkad (242), Pathanamthitta (207), Thiruvananthapuram (681), Thrissur (369), Wayanad (81)	None	3970	1,42,936	PTP	
September-22	Alappuzha (403), Ernakulam (406), Idukki (42), Kannur (143), Kasargod (197), Kollam (347), Kottayam (169), Kozhikode (394), Malappuram (444), Palakkad (242), Pathanamthitta (207), Thiruvananthapuram (681), Thrissur (369), Wayanad (81)	Other states	122	1,42,936	T	
September-22	Alappuzha (403), Ernakulam (406), Idukki (42), Kannur (143), Kasargod (197), Kollam (347), Kottayam (169), Kozhikode (394), Malappuram (444), Palakkad (242), Pathanamthitta (207), Thiruvananthapuram (681), Thrissur (369), Wayanad (81)	Overseas	33	1,42,936	T	
September-23	Alappuzha (501), Ernakulam (624), Idukki (79), Kannur (365), Kasargod (136), Kollam (503), Kottayam (262), Kozhikode (504), Malappuram (512), Palakkad (278), Pathanamthitta (223), Thiruvananthapuram (852), Thrissur (478), Wayanad (59)	None	5172	1,48,132	PTP	
September-23	Alappuzha (501), Ernakulam (624), Idukki (79), Kannur (365), Kasargod (136), Kollam (503), Kottayam (262), Kozhikode (504), Malappuram (512), Palakkad (278), Pathanamthitta (223), Thiruvananthapuram (852), Thrissur (478), Wayanad (59)	Other states	140	1,48,132	T	
September-23	Alappuzha (501), Ernakulam (624), Idukki (79), Kannur (365), Kasargod (136), Kollam (503), Kottayam (262), Kozhikode (504), Malappuram (512), Palakkad (278), Pathanamthitta (223), Thiruvananthapuram (852), Thrissur (478), Wayanad (59)	Overseas	64	1,48,132	T	
September-24	Alappuzha (453), Ernakulam (590), Idukki (151), Kannur (406), Kasargod (300), Kollam (440), Kottayam (341), Kozhikode (883), Malappuram (763), Palakkad (353), Pathanamthitta (189), Thiruvananthapuram (875), Thrissur (474), Wayanad (106)	None	6054	1,54,636	PTP	
September-24	Alappuzha (453), Ernakulam (590), Idukki (151), Kannur (406), Kasargod (300), Kollam (440), Kottayam (341), Kozhikode (883), Malappuram (763), Palakkad (353), Pathanamthitta (189), Thiruvananthapuram (875), Thrissur (474), Wayanad (106)	Other states	226	1,54,636	T	
September-24	Alappuzha (453), Ernakulam (590), Idukki (151), Kannur (406), Kasargod (300), Kollam (440), Kottayam (341), Kozhikode (883), Malappuram (763), Palakkad (353), Pathanamthitta (189), Thiruvananthapuram (875), Thrissur (474), Wayanad (106)	Overseas	44	1,54,636	T	
September-25	Alappuzha (551), Ernakulam (655), Idukki (114), Kannur (419), Kasargod (268), Kollam (569), Kottayam (322), Kozhikode (690), Malappuram (784), Palakkad (353), Pathanamthitta (191), Thiruvananthapuram (814), Thrissur (607), Wayanad (74)	None	6221	1,61,113	PTP	
September-25	Alappuzha (551), Ernakulam (655), Idukki (114), Kannur (419), Kasargod (268), Kollam (569), Kottayam (322), Kozhikode (690), Malappuram (784), Palakkad (353), Pathanamthitta (191), Thiruvananthapuram (814), Thrissur (607), Wayanad (74)	Other states	198	1,61,113	T	
September-25	Alappuzha (551), Ernakulam (655), Idukki (114), Kannur (419), Kasargod (268), Kollam (569), Kottayam (322), Kozhikode (690), Malappuram (784), Palakkad (353), Pathanamthitta (191), Thiruvananthapuram (814), Thrissur (607), Wayanad (74)	Overseas	58	1,61,113	T	
September-26	Alappuzha (414), Ernakulam (729), Idukki (107), Kannur (435), Kasargod (224), Kollam (389), Kottayam (322), Kozhikode (684), Malappuram (826), Palakkad (547), Pathanamthitta (329), Thiruvananthapuram (1050), Thrissur (594), Wayanad (89)	None	6761	1,68,119	PTP	
September-26	Alappuzha (414), Ernakulam (729), Idukki (107), Kannur (435), Kasargod (224), Kollam (389), Kottayam (322), Kozhikode (684), Malappuram (826), Palakkad (547), Pathanamthitta (329), Thiruvananthapuram (1050), Thrissur (594), Wayanad (89)	Other states	177	1,68,119	T	
September-26	Alappuzha (414), Ernakulam (729), Idukki (107), Kannur (435), Kasargod (224), Kollam (389), Kottayam (322), Kozhikode (684), Malappuram (826), Palakkad (547), Pathanamthitta (329), Thiruvananthapuram (1050), Thrissur (594), Wayanad (89)	Overseas	68	1,68,119	T	
September-27	Alappuzha (476), Ernakulam (924), Idukki (125), Kannur (332), Kasargod (252), Kollam (690), Kottayam (426), Kozhikode (956), Malappuram (915), Palakkad (488), Pathanamthitta (263), Thiruvananthapuram (853), Thrissur (573), Wayanad (175)	None	7074	1,75,384	PTP	
September-27	Alappuzha (476), Ernakulam (924), Idukki (125), Kannur (332), Kasargod (252), Kollam (690), Kottayam (426), Kozhikode (956), Malappuram (915), Palakkad (488), Pathanamthitta (263), Thiruvananthapuram (853), Thrissur (573), Wayanad (175)	Other states	309	1,75,384	T	
September-27	Alappuzha (476), Ernakulam (924), Idukki (125), Kannur (332), Kasargod (252), Kollam (690), Kottayam (426), Kozhikode (956), Malappuram (915), Palakkad (488), Pathanamthitta (263), Thiruvananthapuram (853), Thrissur (573), Wayanad (175)	Overseas	62	1,75,384	T	
September-28	Alappuzha (249), Ernakulam (537), Idukki (114), Kannur (310), Kasargod (122), Kollam (341), Kottayam (213), Kozhikode (918), Malappuram (405), Palakkad (378), Pathanamthitta (38), Thiruvananthapuram (486), Thrissur (383), Wayanad (44)	None	4325	1,79,922	PTP	
September-28	Alappuzha (249), Ernakulam (537), Idukki (114), Kannur (310), Kasargod (122), Kollam (341), Kottayam (213), Kozhikode (918), Malappuram (405), Palakkad (378), Pathanamthitta (38), Thiruvananthapuram (486), Thrissur (383), Wayanad (44)	Other states	166	1,79,922	T	
September-28	Alappuzha (249), Ernakulam (537), Idukki (114), Kannur (310), Kasargod (122), Kollam (341), Kottayam (213), Kozhikode (918), Malappuram (405), Palakkad (378), Pathanamthitta (38), Thiruvananthapuram (486), Thrissur (383), Wayanad (44)	Overseas	47	1,79,922	T	
September-29	Alappuzha (524), Ernakulam (859), Idukki (57), Kannur (432), Kasargod (453), Kollam (583), Kottayam (336), Kozhikode (837), Malappuram (1040), Palakkad (374), Pathanamthitta (271), Thiruvananthapuram (935), Thrissur (484), Wayanad (169)	None	7166	1,87,276	PTP	
September-29	Alappuzha (524), Ernakulam (859), Idukki (57), Kannur (432), Kasargod (453), Kollam (583), Kottayam (336), Kozhikode (837), Malappuram (1040), Palakkad (374), Pathanamthitta (271), Thiruvananthapuram (935), Thrissur (484), Wayanad (169)	Other states	130	1,87,276	T	
September-29	Alappuzha (524), Ernakulam (859), Idukki (57), Kannur (432), Kasargod (453), Kollam (583), Kottayam (336), Kozhikode (837), Malappuram (1040), Palakkad (374), Pathanamthitta (271), Thiruvananthapuram (935), Thrissur (484), Wayanad (169)	Overseas	58	1,87,276	T	
September-30	Alappuzha (679), Ernakulam (1056), Idukki (157), Kannur (519), Kasargod (321), Kollam (812), Kottayam (442), Kozhikode (942), Malappuram (977), Palakkad (631), Pathanamthitta (286), Thiruvananthapuram (986), Thrissur (808), Wayanad (214)	None	8608	1,96,106	PTP	
September-30	Alappuzha (679), Ernakulam (1056), Idukki (157), Kannur (519), Kasargod (321), Kollam (812), Kottayam (442), Kozhikode (942), Malappuram (977), Palakkad (631), Pathanamthitta (286), Thiruvananthapuram (986), Thrissur (808), Wayanad (214)	Other states	164	1,96,106	T	
September-30	Alappuzha (679), Ernakulam (1056), Idukki (157), Kannur (519), Kasargod (321), Kollam (812), Kottayam (442), Kozhikode (942), Malappuram (977), Palakkad (631), Pathanamthitta (286), Thiruvananthapuram (986), Thrissur (808), Wayanad (214)	Overseas	58	1,96,106	T	
October-1	Alappuzha (804), Ernakulam (934), Idukki (130), Kannur (435), Kasargod (471), Kollam (633), Kottayam (340), Kozhikode (1072), Malappuram (968), Palakkad (513), Pathanamthitta (223), Thiruvananthapuram (856), Thrissur (613), Wayanad (143)	None	7013	2,04,241	PTP	
October-1	Alappuzha (804), Ernakulam (934), Idukki (130), Kannur (435), Kasargod (471), Kollam (633), Kottayam (340), Kozhikode (1072), Malappuram (968), Palakkad (513), Pathanamthitta (223), Thiruvananthapuram (856), Thrissur (613), Wayanad (143)	Other states	218	2,04,241	T	
October-1	Alappuzha (804), Ernakulam (934), Idukki (130), Kannur (435), Kasargod (471), Kollam (633), Kottayam (340), Kozhikode (1072), Malappuram (968), Palakkad (513), Pathanamthitta (223), Thiruvananthapuram (856), Thrissur (613), Wayanad (143)	Overseas	67	2,04,241	T	
October-2	Alappuzha (605), Ernakulam (1042), Idukki (136), Kannur (625), Kasargod (476), Kollam (892), Kottayam (432), Kozhikode (1146), Malappuram (1016), Palakkad (633), Pathanamthitta (239), Thiruvananthapuram (1096), Thrissur (812), Wayanad (108)	None	8274	2,13,499	PTP	
October-2	Alappuzha (605), Ernakulam (1042), Idukki (136), Kannur (625), Kasargod (476), Kollam (892), Kottayam (432), Kozhikode (1146), Malappuram (1016), Palakkad (633), Pathanamthitta (239), Thiruvananthapuram (1096), Thrissur (812), Wayanad (108)	Other states	184	2,13,499	T	
October-2	Alappuzha (605), Ernakulam (1042), Idukki (136), Kannur (625), Kasargod (476), Kollam (892), Kottayam (432), Kozhikode (1146), Malappuram (1016), Palakkad (633), Pathanamthitta (239), Thiruvananthapuram (1096), Thrissur (812), Wayanad (108)	Overseas	47	2,13,499	T	
October-3	Alappuzha (633), Ernakulam (925), Idukki (106), Kannur (423), Kasargod (257), Kollam (534), Kottayam (342), Kozhikode (941), Malappuram (973), Palakkad (496), Pathanamthitta (296), Thiruvananthapuram (1049), Thrissur (778), Wayanad (81)	None	6850	2,21,333	PTP	
October-3	Alappuzha (633), Ernakulam (925), Idukki (106), Kannur (423), Kasargod (257), Kollam (534), Kottayam (342), Kozhikode (941), Malappuram (973), Palakkad (496), Pathanamthitta (296), Thiruvananthapuram (1049), Thrissur (778), Wayanad (81)	Other states	187	2,21,333	T	
October-3	Alappuzha (633), Ernakulam (925), Idukki (106), Kannur (423), Kasargod (257), Kollam (534), Kottayam (342), Kozhikode (941), Malappuram (973), Palakkad (496), Pathanamthitta (296), Thiruvananthapuram (1049), Thrissur (778), Wayanad (81)	Overseas	49	2,21,333	T	
October-4	Alappuzha (544), Ernakulam (952), Idukki (96), Kannur (555), Kasargod (278), Kollam (866), Kottayam (474), Kozhikode (1164), Malappuram (792), Palakkad (496), Pathanamthitta (315), Thiruvananthapuram (1119), Thrissur (793), Wayanad (109)	None	8342	2,29,886	PTP	
October-4	Alappuzha (544), Ernakulam (952), Idukki (96), Kannur (555), Kasargod (278), Kollam (866), Kottayam (474), Kozhikode (1164), Malappuram (792), Palakkad (496), Pathanamthitta (315), Thiruvananthapuram (1119), Thrissur (793), Wayanad (109)	Other states	181	2,29,886	T	
October-4	Alappuzha (544), Ernakulam (952), Idukki (96), Kannur (555), Kasargod (278), Kollam (866), Kottayam (474), Kozhikode (1164), Malappuram (792), Palakkad (496), Pathanamthitta (315), Thiruvananthapuram (1119), Thrissur (793), Wayanad (109)	Overseas	30	2,29,886	T	
October-5	Alappuzha (199), Ernakulam (705), Idukki (71), Kannur (339), Kasargod (207), Kollam (458), Kottayam (354), Kozhikode (641), Malappuram (606), Palakkad (281), Pathanamthitta (25), Thiruvananthapuram (700), Thrissur (425), Wayanad (31)	None	4338	2,34,928	PTP	
October-5	Alappuzha (199), Ernakulam (705), Idukki (71), Kannur (339), Kasargod (207), Kollam (458), Kottayam (354), Kozhikode (641), Malappuram (606), Palakkad (281), Pathanamthitta (25), Thiruvananthapuram (700), Thrissur (425), Wayanad (31)	Other states	102	2,34,928	T	
October-5	Alappuzha (199), Ernakulam (705), Idukki (71), Kannur (339), Kasargod (207), Kollam (458), Kottayam (354), Kozhikode (641), Malappuram (606), Palakkad (281), Pathanamthitta (25), Thiruvananthapuram (700), Thrissur (425), Wayanad (31)	Overseas	29	2,34,928	T	
October-6	Alappuzha (424), Ernakulam (837), Idukki (56), Kannur (545), Kasargod (416), Kollam (845), Kottayam (427), Kozhikode (736), Malappuram (854), Palakkad (520), Pathanamthitta (330), Thiruvananthapuram (989), Thrissur (757), Wayanad (135)	None	6910	2,42,799	PTP	
October-6	Alappuzha (424), Ernakulam (837), Idukki (56), Kannur (545), Kasargod (416), Kollam (845), Kottayam (427), Kozhikode (736), Malappuram (854), Palakkad (520), Pathanamthitta (330), Thiruvananthapuram (989), Thrissur (757), Wayanad (135)	Other states	146	2,42,799	T	
October-6	Alappuzha (424), Ernakulam (837), Idukki (56), Kannur (545), Kasargod (416), Kollam (845), Kottayam (427), Kozhikode (736), Malappuram (854), Palakkad (520), Pathanamthitta (330), Thiruvananthapuram (989), Thrissur (757), Wayanad (135)	Overseas	54	2,42,799	T	
October-7	Alappuzha (672), Ernakulam (1201), Idukki (120), Kannur (602), Kasargod (432), Kollam (852), Kottayam (490), Kozhikode (1576), Malappuram (1350), Palakkad (650), Pathanamthitta (393), Thiruvananthapuram (1182), Thrissur (948), Wayanad (138)	None	9542	2,53,405	PTP	
October-7	Alappuzha (672), Ernakulam (1201), Idukki (120), Kannur (602), Kasargod (432), Kollam (852), Kottayam (490), Kozhikode (1576), Malappuram (1350), Palakkad (650), Pathanamthitta (393), Thiruvananthapuram (1182), Thrissur (948), Wayanad (138)	Other states	164	2,53,405	T	
October-7	Alappuzha (672), Ernakulam (1201), Idukki (120), Kannur (602), Kasargod (432), Kollam (852), Kottayam (490), Kozhikode (1576), Malappuram (1350), Palakkad (650), Pathanamthitta (393), Thiruvananthapuram (1182), Thrissur (948), Wayanad (138)	Overseas	55	2,53,405	T	
October-8	Alappuzha (317), Ernakulam (391), Idukki (121), Kannur (377), Kasargod (236), Kollam (497), Kottayam (231), Kozhikode (688), Malappuram (1024), Palakkad (285), Pathanamthitta (295), Thiruvananthapuram (467), Thrissur (385), Wayanad (131)	None	4616	2,58,850	PTP	
October-8	Alappuzha (317), Ernakulam (391), Idukki (121), Kannur (377), Kasargod (236), Kollam (497), Kottayam (231), Kozhikode (688), Malappuram (1024), Palakkad (285), Pathanamthitta (295), Thiruvananthapuram (467), Thrissur (385), Wayanad (131)	Other states	195	2,58,850	T	
October-8	Alappuzha (317), Ernakulam (391), Idukki (121), Kannur (377), Kasargod (236), Kollam (497), Kottayam (231), Kozhikode (688), Malappuram (1024), Palakkad (285), Pathanamthitta (295), Thiruvananthapuram (467), Thrissur (385), Wayanad (131)	Overseas	55	2,58,850	T	
October-9	Alappuzha (793), Ernakulam (911), Idukki (153), Kannur (556), Kasargod (366), Kollam (714), Kottayam (522), Kozhikode (1205), Malappuram (1174), Palakkad (672), Pathanamthitta (290), Thiruvananthapuram (1012), Thrissur (755), Wayanad (127)	None	8215	2,68,100	PTP	
October-9	Alappuzha (793), Ernakulam (911), Idukki (153), Kannur (556), Kasargod (366), Kollam (714), Kottayam (522), Kozhikode (1205), Malappuram (1174), Palakkad (672), Pathanamthitta (290), Thiruvananthapuram (1012), Thrissur (755), Wayanad (127)	Other states	143	2,68,100	T	
October-9	Alappuzha (793), Ernakulam (911), Idukki (153), Kannur (556), Kasargod (366), Kollam (714), Kottayam (522), Kozhikode (1205), Malappuram (1174), Palakkad (672), Pathanamthitta (290), Thiruvananthapuram (1012), Thrissur (755), Wayanad (127)	Overseas	24	2,68,100	T	
October-10	Alappuzha (843), Ernakulam (1191), Idukki (139), Kannur (727), Kasargod (539), Kollam (1107), Kottayam (523), Kozhikode (1324), Malappuram (1632), Palakkad (677), Pathanamthitta (348), Thiruvananthapuram (1310), Thrissur (1208), Wayanad (187)	None	10471	2,79,855	PTP	
October-10	Alappuzha (843), Ernakulam (1191), Idukki (139), Kannur (727), Kasargod (539), Kollam (1107), Kottayam (523), Kozhikode (1324), Malappuram (1632), Palakkad (677), Pathanamthitta (348), Thiruvananthapuram (1310), Thrissur (1208), Wayanad (187)	Other states	169	2,79,855	T	
October-10	Alappuzha (843), Ernakulam (1191), Idukki (139), Kannur (727), Kasargod (539), Kollam (1107), Kottayam (523), Kozhikode (1324), Malappuram (1632), Palakkad (677), Pathanamthitta (348), Thiruvananthapuram (1310), Thrissur (1208), Wayanad (187)	Overseas	40	2,79,855	T	
October-11	Alappuzha (619), Ernakulam (1228), Idukki (123), Kannur (413), Kasargod (242), Kollam (712), Kottayam (417), Kozhikode (1219), Malappuram (1451), Palakkad (640), Pathanamthitta (378), Thiruvananthapuram (797), Thrissur (960), Wayanad (148)	None	8216	2,89,202	PTP	
October-11	Alappuzha (619), Ernakulam (1228), Idukki (123), Kannur (413), Kasargod (242), Kollam (712), Kottayam (417), Kozhikode (1219), Malappuram (1451), Palakkad (640), Pathanamthitta (378), Thiruvananthapuram (797), Thrissur (960), Wayanad (148)	Other states	155	2,89,202	T	
October-11	Alappuzha (619), Ernakulam (1228), Idukki (123), Kannur (413), Kasargod (242), Kollam (712), Kottayam (417), Kozhikode (1219), Malappuram (1451), Palakkad (640), Pathanamthitta (378), Thiruvananthapuram (797), Thrissur (960), Wayanad (148)	Overseas	46	2,89,202	T	
October-12	Alappuzha (618), Ernakulam (480), Idukki (94), Kannur (274), Kasargod (295), Kollam (343), Kottayam (382), Kozhikode (869), Malappuram (740), Palakkad (288), Pathanamthitta (186), Thiruvananthapuram (629), Thrissur (697), Wayanad (35)	None	4767	2,95,132	PTP	
October-12	Alappuzha (618), Ernakulam (480), Idukki (94), Kannur (274), Kasargod (295), Kollam (343), Kottayam (382), Kozhikode (869), Malappuram (740), Palakkad (288), Pathanamthitta (186), Thiruvananthapuram (629), Thrissur (697), Wayanad (35)	Other states	86	2,95,132	T	
October-12	Alappuzha (618), Ernakulam (480), Idukki (94), Kannur (274), Kasargod (295), Kollam (343), Kottayam (382), Kozhikode (869), Malappuram (740), Palakkad (288), Pathanamthitta (186), Thiruvananthapuram (629), Thrissur (697), Wayanad (35)	Overseas	48	2,95,132	T	
October-13	Alappuzha (488), Ernakulam (1122), Idukki (79), Kannur (370), Kasargod (323), Kollam (907), Kottayam (476), Kozhikode (1113), Malappuram (1139), Palakkad (606), Pathanamthitta (244), Thiruvananthapuram (777), Thrissur (1010), Wayanad (110)	None	8039	3,03,896	PTP	
October-13	Alappuzha (488), Ernakulam (1122), Idukki (79), Kannur (370), Kasargod (323), Kollam (907), Kottayam (476), Kozhikode (1113), Malappuram (1139), Palakkad (606), Pathanamthitta (244), Thiruvananthapuram (777), Thrissur (1010), Wayanad (110)	Other states	85	3,03,896	T	
October-13	Alappuzha (488), Ernakulam (1122), Idukki (79), Kannur (370), Kasargod (323), Kollam (907), Kottayam (476), Kozhikode (1113), Malappuram (1139), Palakkad (606), Pathanamthitta (244), Thiruvananthapuram (777), Thrissur (1010), Wayanad (110)	Overseas	36	3,03,896	T	
October-14	Alappuzha (456), Ernakulam (793), Idukki (114), Kannur (303), Kasargod (224), Kollam (551), Kottayam (350), Kozhikode (661), Malappuram (1013), Palakkad (364), Pathanamthitta (169), Thiruvananthapuram (581), Thrissur (581), Wayanad (84)	None	5745	3,03,896	PTP	
October-14	Alappuzha (456), Ernakulam (793), Idukki (114), Kannur (303), Kasargod (224), Kollam (551), Kottayam (350), Kozhikode (661), Malappuram (1013), Palakkad (364), Pathanamthitta (169), Thiruvananthapuram (581), Thrissur (581), Wayanad (84)	Other states	81	3,03,896	T	
October-14	Alappuzha (456), Ernakulam (793), Idukki (114), Kannur (303), Kasargod (224), Kollam (551), Kottayam (350), Kozhikode (661), Malappuram (1013), Palakkad (364), Pathanamthitta (169), Thiruvananthapuram (581), Thrissur (581), Wayanad (84)	Overseas	18	3,03,896	T	
October-15	Alappuzha (521), Ernakulam (1209), Idukki (143), Kannur (557), Kasargod (311), Kollam (551), Kottayam (495), Kozhikode (1264), Malappuram (447), Palakkad (354), Pathanamthitta (248), Thiruvananthapuram (679), Thrissur (867), Wayanad (143)	None	6486	3,17,929	PTP	
October-15	Alappuzha (521), Ernakulam (1209), Idukki (143), Kannur (557), Kasargod (311), Kollam (551), Kottayam (495), Kozhikode (1264), Malappuram (447), Palakkad (354), Pathanamthitta (248), Thiruvananthapuram (679), Thrissur (867), Wayanad (143)	Other states	-	3,17,929	T	
October-15	Alappuzha (521), Ernakulam (1209), Idukki (143), Kannur (557), Kasargod (311), Kollam (551), Kottayam (495), Kozhikode (1264), Malappuram (447), Palakkad (354), Pathanamthitta (248), Thiruvananthapuram (679), Thrissur (867), Wayanad (143)	Overseas	-	3,17,929	T	
October-16	Alappuzha (563), Ernakulam (606), Idukki (124), Kannur (405), Kasargod (234), Kollam (418), Kottayam (432), Kozhikode (970), Malappuram (1025), Palakkad (648), Pathanamthitta (296), Thiruvananthapuram (595), Thrissur (809), Wayanad (158)	None	5731	3,25,212	PTP	
October-16	Alappuzha (563), Ernakulam (606), Idukki (124), Kannur (405), Kasargod (234), Kollam (418), Kottayam (432), Kozhikode (970), Malappuram (1025), Palakkad (648), Pathanamthitta (296), Thiruvananthapuram (595), Thrissur (809), Wayanad (158)	Other states	144	3,25,212	T	
October-16	Alappuzha (563), Ernakulam (606), Idukki (124), Kannur (405), Kasargod (234), Kollam (418), Kottayam (432), Kozhikode (970), Malappuram (1025), Palakkad (648), Pathanamthitta (296), Thiruvananthapuram (595), Thrissur (809), Wayanad (158)	Overseas	-	3,25,212	T	
October-17	Alappuzha (629), Ernakulam (1022), Idukki (140), Kannur (464), Kasargod (280), Kollam (656), Kottayam (411), Kozhikode (926), Malappuram (1519), Palakkad (688), Pathanamthitta (203), Thiruvananthapuram (848), Thrissur (1109), Wayanad (121)	None	7464	3,34,228	PTP	
October-17	Alappuzha (629), Ernakulam (1022), Idukki (140), Kannur (464), Kasargod (280), Kollam (656), Kottayam (411), Kozhikode (926), Malappuram (1519), Palakkad (688), Pathanamthitta (203), Thiruvananthapuram (848), Thrissur (1109), Wayanad (121)	Import	127	3,34,228	T	
October-18	Alappuzha (385), Ernakulam (730), Idukki (162), Kannur (462), Kasargod (251), Kollam (540), Kottayam (514), Kozhikode (976), Malappuram (1399), Palakkad (342), Pathanamthitta (179), Thiruvananthapuram (685), Thrissur (862), Wayanad (144)	None	6685	3,34,228	PTP	
October-18	Alappuzha (385), Ernakulam (730), Idukki (162), Kannur (462), Kasargod (251), Kollam (540), Kottayam (514), Kozhikode (976), Malappuram (1399), Palakkad (342), Pathanamthitta (179), Thiruvananthapuram (685), Thrissur (862), Wayanad (144)	Import	160	3,34,228	T	
October-19	Alappuzha (340), Ernakulam (598), Idukki (28), Kannur (293), Kasargod (120), Kollam (378), Kottayam (180), Kozhikode (772), Malappuram (910), Palakkad (271), Pathanamthitta (32), Thiruvananthapuram (516), Thrissur (533), Wayanad (51)	None	4257	3,46,881	PTP	
October-19	Alappuzha (340), Ernakulam (598), Idukki (28), Kannur (293), Kasargod (120), Kollam (378), Kottayam (180), Kozhikode (772), Malappuram (910), Palakkad (271), Pathanamthitta (32), Thiruvananthapuram (516), Thrissur (533), Wayanad (51)	Import	-	3,46,881	T	
October-20	Alappuzha (592), Ernakulam (644), Idukki (72), Kannur (400), Kasargod (145), Kollam (569), Kottayam (473), Kozhikode (806), Malappuram (786), Palakkad (403), Pathanamthitta (248), Thiruvananthapuram (470), Thrissur (896), Wayanad (87)	None	5717	3,53,472	PTP	
October-20	Alappuzha (592), Ernakulam (644), Idukki (72), Kannur (400), Kasargod (145), Kollam (569), Kottayam (473), Kozhikode (806), Malappuram (786), Palakkad (403), Pathanamthitta (248), Thiruvananthapuram (470), Thrissur (896), Wayanad (87)	Import	105	3,53,472	T	
October-21	Alappuzha (820), Ernakulam (1190), Idukki (100), Kannur (566), Kasargod (200), Kollam (742), Kottayam (526), Kozhikode (1158), Malappuram (668), Palakkad (417), Pathanamthitta (247), Thiruvananthapuram (657), Thrissur (946), Wayanad (132)	None	7262	3,61,841	PTP	
October-21	Alappuzha (820), Ernakulam (1190), Idukki (100), Kannur (566), Kasargod (200), Kollam (742), Kottayam (526), Kozhikode (1158), Malappuram (668), Palakkad (417), Pathanamthitta (247), Thiruvananthapuram (657), Thrissur (946), Wayanad (132)	Import	160	3,61,841	T	
October-23	Alappuzha (716), Ernakulam (874), Idukki (140), Kannur (497), Kasargod (189), Kollam (671), Kottayam (426), Kozhikode (751), Malappuram (1375), Palakkad (531), Pathanamthitta (285), Thiruvananthapuram (890), Thrissur (1020), Wayanad (146)	None	7269	3,77,834	PTP	
October-23	Alappuzha (716), Ernakulam (874), Idukki (140), Kannur (497), Kasargod (189), Kollam (671), Kottayam (426), Kozhikode (751), Malappuram (1375), Palakkad (531), Pathanamthitta (285), Thiruvananthapuram (890), Thrissur (1020), Wayanad (146)	Import	148	3,77,834	T	
October-24	Alappuzha (706), Ernakulam (1170), Idukki (201), Kannur (430), Kasargod (200), Kollam (737), Kottayam (458), Kozhikode (770), Malappuram (719), Palakkad (457), Pathanamthitta (331), Thiruvananthapuram (909), Thrissur (1086), Wayanad (79)	None	7084	3,86,087	PTP	
October-24	Alappuzha (706), Ernakulam (1170), Idukki (201), Kannur (430), Kasargod (200), Kollam (737), Kottayam (458), Kozhikode (770), Malappuram (719), Palakkad (457), Pathanamthitta (331), Thiruvananthapuram (909), Thrissur (1086), Wayanad (79)	Import	163	3,86,087	T	
October-25	Alappuzha (542), Ernakulam (816), Idukki (152), Kannur (274), Kasargod (137), Kollam (527), Kottayam (386), Kozhikode (869), Malappuram (653), Palakkad (374), Pathanamthitta (303), Thiruvananthapuram (712), Thrissur (1011), Wayanad (87)	None	5694	3,92,930	PTP	
October-25	Alappuzha (542), Ernakulam (816), Idukki (152), Kannur (274), Kasargod (137), Kollam (527), Kottayam (386), Kozhikode (869), Malappuram (653), Palakkad (374), Pathanamthitta (303), Thiruvananthapuram (712), Thrissur (1011), Wayanad (87)	Import	159	3,92,930	T	
October-26	Alappuzha (332), Ernakulam (457), Idukki (79), Kannur (174), Kasargod (64), Kollam (316), Kottayam (194), Kozhikode (497), Malappuram (853), Palakkad (276), Pathanamthitta (24), Thiruvananthapuram (513), Thrissur (480), Wayanad (28)	None	3711	3,97,217	PTP	
October-26	Alappuzha (332), Ernakulam (457), Idukki (79), Kannur (174), Kasargod (64), Kollam (316), Kottayam (194), Kozhikode (497), Malappuram (853), Palakkad (276), Pathanamthitta (24), Thiruvananthapuram (513), Thrissur (480), Wayanad (28)	Import	52	3,97,217	T	
October-27	Alappuzha (647), Ernakulam (716), Idukki (49), Kannur (258), Kasargod (65), Kollam (329), Kottayam (395), Kozhikode (597), Malappuram (706), Palakkad (337), Pathanamthitta (112), Thiruvananthapuram (413), Thrissur (730), Wayanad (103)	None	4702	4,02,674	PTP	
October-27	Alappuzha (647), Ernakulam (716), Idukki (49), Kannur (258), Kasargod (65), Kollam (329), Kottayam (395), Kozhikode (597), Malappuram (706), Palakkad (337), Pathanamthitta (112), Thiruvananthapuram (413), Thrissur (730), Wayanad (103)	Import	88	4,02,674	T	
October-28	Alappuzha (790), Ernakulam (1250), Idukki (115), Kannur (506), Kasargod (203), Kollam (935), Kottayam (594), Kozhikode (1149), Malappuram (548), Palakkad (449), Pathanamthitta (260), Thiruvananthapuram (785), Thrissur (1018), Wayanad (188)	None	7646	4,11,464	PTP	
October-28	Alappuzha (790), Ernakulam (1250), Idukki (115), Kannur (506), Kasargod (203), Kollam (935), Kottayam (594), Kozhikode (1149), Malappuram (548), Palakkad (449), Pathanamthitta (260), Thiruvananthapuram (785), Thrissur (1018), Wayanad (188)	Import	178	4,11,464	T	
October-29	Alappuzha (788), Ernakulam (802), Idukki (168), Kannur (419), Kasargod (187), Kollam (482), Kottayam (389), Kozhikode (692), Malappuram (589), Palakkad (369), Pathanamthitta (270), Thiruvananthapuram (789), Thrissur (983), Wayanad (93)	None	6037	4,18,484	PTP	
October-29	Alappuzha (788), Ernakulam (802), Idukki (168), Kannur (419), Kasargod (187), Kollam (482), Kottayam (389), Kozhikode (692), Malappuram (589), Palakkad (369), Pathanamthitta (270), Thiruvananthapuram (789), Thrissur (983), Wayanad (93)	Import	168	4,18,484	T	
October-30	Alappuzha (664), Ernakulam (674), Idukki (76), Kannur (341), Kasargod (133), Kollam (482), Kottayam (367), Kozhikode (722), Malappuram (761), Palakkad (482), Pathanamthitta (163), Thiruvananthapuram (587), Thrissur (1096), Wayanad (90)	None	5789	4,25,122	PTP	
October-30	Alappuzha (664), Ernakulam (674), Idukki (76), Kannur (341), Kasargod (133), Kollam (482), Kottayam (367), Kozhikode (722), Malappuram (761), Palakkad (482), Pathanamthitta (163), Thiruvananthapuram (587), Thrissur (1096), Wayanad (90)	Import	85	4,25,122	T	
October-31	Alappuzha (645), Ernakulam (1114), Idukki (57), Kannur (337), Kasargod (156), Kollam (741), Kottayam (584), Kozhikode (834), Malappuram (769), Palakkad (496), Pathanamthitta (203), Thiruvananthapuram (790), Thrissur (1112), Wayanad (145)	None	7049	4,33,105	PTP	
October-31	Alappuzha (645), Ernakulam (1114), Idukki (57), Kannur (337), Kasargod (156), Kollam (741), Kottayam (584), Kozhikode (834), Malappuram (769), Palakkad (496), Pathanamthitta (203), Thiruvananthapuram (790), Thrissur (1112), Wayanad (145)	Import	-	4,33,105	T	
November-1	Alappuzha (616), Ernakulam (1042), Idukki (148), Kannur (306), Kasargod (143), Kollam (711), Kottayam (434), Kozhikode (888), Malappuram (522), Palakkad (435), Pathanamthitta (160), Thiruvananthapuram (591), Thrissur (943), Wayanad (86)	None	7049	4,33,105	PTP	
November-1	Alappuzha (616), Ernakulam (1042), Idukki (148), Kannur (306), Kasargod (143), Kollam (711), Kottayam (434), Kozhikode (888), Malappuram (522), Palakkad (435), Pathanamthitta (160), Thiruvananthapuram (591), Thrissur (943), Wayanad (86)	Import	-	4,33,105	T	
November-2	Alappuzha (498), Ernakulam (518), Idukki (60), Kannur (195), Kasargod (58), Kollam (350), Kottayam (246), Kozhikode (576), Malappuram (467), Palakkad (286), Pathanamthitta (44), Thiruvananthapuram (361), Thrissur (433), Wayanad (46)	None	3599	4,44,268	PTP	
November-2	Alappuzha (498), Ernakulam (518), Idukki (60), Kannur (195), Kasargod (58), Kollam (350), Kottayam (246), Kozhikode (576), Malappuram (467), Palakkad (286), Pathanamthitta (44), Thiruvananthapuram (361), Thrissur (433), Wayanad (46)	Import	-	4,44,268	T	
November-3	Alappuzha (760), Ernakulam (850), Idukki (67), Kannur (335), Kasargod (147), Kollam (583), Kottayam (507), Kozhikode (842), Malappuram (467), Palakkad (431), Pathanamthitta (245), Thiruvananthapuram (654), Thrissur (856), Wayanad (118)	None	5899	4,51,130	PTP	
November-3	Alappuzha (760), Ernakulam (850), Idukki (67), Kannur (335), Kasargod (147), Kollam (583), Kottayam (507), Kozhikode (842), Malappuram (467), Palakkad (431), Pathanamthitta (245), Thiruvananthapuram (654), Thrissur (856), Wayanad (118)	Import	-	4,51,130	T	
November-4	Alappuzha (765), Ernakulam (1197), Idukki (204), Kannur (370), Kasargod (182), Kollam (937), Kottayam (571), Kozhikode (951), Malappuram (784), Palakkad (453), Pathanamthitta (186), Thiruvananthapuram (651), Thrissur (1114), Wayanad (151)	None	7473	4,59,646	PTP	
November-4	Alappuzha (765), Ernakulam (1197), Idukki (204), Kannur (370), Kasargod (182), Kollam (937), Kottayam (571), Kozhikode (951), Malappuram (784), Palakkad (453), Pathanamthitta (186), Thiruvananthapuram (651), Thrissur (1114), Wayanad (151)	Import	97	4,59,646	T	
November-5	Alappuzha (660), Ernakulam (749), Idukki (116), Kannur (329), Kasargod (155), Kollam (523), Kottayam (479), Kozhikode (828), Malappuram (627), Palakkad (372), Pathanamthitta (212), Thiruvananthapuram (756), Thrissur (900), Wayanad (114)	None	5935	4,66,466	PTP	
November-5	Alappuzha (660), Ernakulam (749), Idukki (116), Kannur (329), Kasargod (155), Kollam (523), Kottayam (479), Kozhikode (828), Malappuram (627), Palakkad (372), Pathanamthitta (212), Thiruvananthapuram (756), Thrissur (900), Wayanad (114)	Import	95	4,66,466	T	
November-6	Alappuzha (643), Ernakulam (673), Idukki (157), Kannur (354), Kasargod (137), Kollam (671), Kottayam (461), Kozhikode (763), Malappuram (761), Palakkad (464), Pathanamthitta (183), Thiruvananthapuram (617), Thrissur (951), Wayanad (167)	None	6192	4,73,468	PTP	
November-6	Alappuzha (643), Ernakulam (673), Idukki (157), Kannur (354), Kasargod (137), Kollam (671), Kottayam (461), Kozhikode (763), Malappuram (761), Palakkad (464), Pathanamthitta (183), Thiruvananthapuram (617), Thrissur (951), Wayanad (167)	Import	-	4,73,468	T	
November-7	Alappuzha (696), Ernakulam (1042), Idukki (108), Kannur (266), Kasargod (94), Kollam (574), Kottayam (500), Kozhikode (971), Malappuram (642), Palakkad (465), Pathanamthitta (147), Thiruvananthapuram (719), Thrissur (864), Wayanad (113)	None	6316	4,80,669	PTP	
November-7	Alappuzha (696), Ernakulam (1042), Idukki (108), Kannur (266), Kasargod (94), Kollam (574), Kottayam (500), Kozhikode (971), Malappuram (642), Palakkad (465), Pathanamthitta (147), Thiruvananthapuram (719), Thrissur (864), Wayanad (113)	Import	-	4,80,669	T	
November-8	Alappuzha (479), Ernakulam (644), Idukki (179), Kannur (344), Kasargod (159), Kollam (488), Kottayam (406), Kozhikode (575), Malappuram (540), Palakkad (306), Pathanamthitta (153), Thiruvananthapuram (421), Thrissur (641), Wayanad (105)	None	4699	4,78,908	PTP	
November-8	Alappuzha (479), Ernakulam (644), Idukki (179), Kannur (344), Kasargod (159), Kollam (488), Kottayam (406), Kozhikode (575), Malappuram (540), Palakkad (306), Pathanamthitta (153), Thiruvananthapuram (421), Thrissur (641), Wayanad (105)	Import	-	4,78,908	T	
November-9	Alappuzha (353), Ernakulam (433), Idukki (42), Kannur (152), Kasargod (75), Kollam (236), Kottayam (203), Kozhikode (479), Malappuram (548), Palakkad (225), Pathanamthitta (43), Thiruvananthapuram (324), Thrissur (430), Wayanad (50)	None	3070	4,89,702	PTP	
November-9	Alappuzha (353), Ernakulam (433), Idukki (42), Kannur (152), Kasargod (75), Kollam (236), Kottayam (203), Kozhikode (479), Malappuram (548), Palakkad (225), Pathanamthitta (43), Thiruvananthapuram (324), Thrissur (430), Wayanad (50)	Import	61	4,89,702	T	
November-10	Alappuzha (641), Ernakulam (583), Idukki (89), Kannur (301), Kasargod (81), Kollam (431), Kottayam (426), Kozhikode (807), Malappuram (685), Palakkad (342), Pathanamthitta (234), Thiruvananthapuram (567), Thrissur (711), Wayanad (112)	None	5188	4,95,712	PTP	
November-10	Alappuzha (641), Ernakulam (583), Idukki (89), Kannur (301), Kasargod (81), Kollam (431), Kottayam (426), Kozhikode (807), Malappuram (685), Palakkad (342), Pathanamthitta (234), Thiruvananthapuram (567), Thrissur (711), Wayanad (112)	Import	-	4,95,712	T	
November-11	Alappuzha (521), Ernakulam (977), Idukki (225), Kannur (264), Kasargod (141), Kollam (679), Kottayam (580), Kozhikode (830), Malappuram (527), Palakkad (424), Pathanamthitta (230), Thiruvananthapuram (484), Thrissur (966), Wayanad (159)	None	6152	5,02,719	PTP	
November-11	Alappuzha (521), Ernakulam (977), Idukki (225), Kannur (264), Kasargod (141), Kollam (679), Kottayam (580), Kozhikode (830), Malappuram (527), Palakkad (424), Pathanamthitta (230), Thiruvananthapuram (484), Thrissur (966), Wayanad (159)	Import	86	5,02,719	T	
November-12	Alappuzha (568), Ernakulam (489), Idukki (185), Kannur (346), Kasargod (108), Kollam (399), Kottayam (344), Kozhikode (696), Malappuram (617), Palakkad (434), Pathanamthitta (138), Thiruvananthapuram (386), Thrissur (727), Wayanad (100)	None	4683	5,08,256	PTP	
November-12	Alappuzha (568), Ernakulam (489), Idukki (185), Kannur (346), Kasargod (108), Kollam (399), Kottayam (344), Kozhikode (696), Malappuram (617), Palakkad (434), Pathanamthitta (138), Thiruvananthapuram (386), Thrissur (727), Wayanad (100)	Import	140	5,08,256	T	
November-13	Alappuzha (468), Ernakulam (756), Idukki (187), Kannur (240), Kasargod (81), Kollam (489), Kottayam (347), Kozhikode (799), Malappuram (588), Palakkad (438), Pathanamthitta (189), Thiruvananthapuram (439), Thrissur (677), Wayanad (106)	None	4988	5,14,060	PTP	
November-13	Alappuzha (468), Ernakulam (756), Idukki (187), Kannur (240), Kasargod (81), Kollam (489), Kottayam (347), Kozhikode (799), Malappuram (588), Palakkad (438), Pathanamthitta (189), Thiruvananthapuram (439), Thrissur (677), Wayanad (106)	Import	118	5,14,060	T	
November-14	Alappuzha (542), Ernakulam (860), Idukki (107), Kannur (363), Kasargod (139), Kollam (530), Kottayam (425), Kozhikode (710), Malappuram (673), Palakkad (467), Pathanamthitta (143), Thiruvananthapuram (468), Thrissur (759), Wayanad (171)	None	5542	5,20,417	PTP	
November-14	Alappuzha (542), Ernakulam (860), Idukki (107), Kannur (363), Kasargod (139), Kollam (530), Kottayam (425), Kozhikode (710), Malappuram (673), Palakkad (467), Pathanamthitta (143), Thiruvananthapuram (468), Thrissur (759), Wayanad (171)	Import	107	5,20,417	T	
November-15	Alappuzha (496), Ernakulam (489), Idukki (165), Kannur (203), Kasargod (62), Kollam (341), Kottayam (266), Kozhikode (574), Malappuram (558), Palakkad (416), Pathanamthitta (171), Thiruvananthapuram (314), Thrissur (425), Wayanad (101)	None	3920	5,24,998	PTP	
November-15	Alappuzha (496), Ernakulam (489), Idukki (165), Kannur (203), Kasargod (62), Kollam (341), Kottayam (266), Kozhikode (574), Malappuram (558), Palakkad (416), Pathanamthitta (171), Thiruvananthapuram (314), Thrissur (425), Wayanad (101)	Import	85	5,24,998	T	
November-16	Alappuzha (226), Ernakulam (279), Idukki (83), Kannur (110), Kasargod (64), Kollam (191), Kottayam (165), Kozhikode (402), Malappuram (496), Palakkad (185), Pathanamthitta (40), Thiruvananthapuram (204), Thrissur (228), Wayanad (37)	None	2347	5,27,708	PTP	
November-16	Alappuzha (226), Ernakulam (279), Idukki (83), Kannur (110), Kasargod (64), Kollam (191), Kottayam (165), Kozhikode (402), Malappuram (496), Palakkad (185), Pathanamthitta (40), Thiruvananthapuram (204), Thrissur (228), Wayanad (37)	Import	-	5,27,708	T	
November-19	Alappuzha (527), Ernakulam (423), Idukki (276), Kannur (337), Kasargod (145), Kollam (338), Kottayam (342), Kozhikode (575), Malappuram (862), Palakkad (496), Pathanamthitta (200), Thiruvananthapuram (456), Thrissur (631), Wayanad (114)	None	4904	5,45,641	PTP	
November-19	Alappuzha (527), Ernakulam (423), Idukki (276), Kannur (337), Kasargod (145), Kollam (338), Kottayam (342), Kozhikode (575), Malappuram (862), Palakkad (496), Pathanamthitta (200), Thiruvananthapuram (456), Thrissur (631), Wayanad (114)	Import	-	5,45,641	T	
November-20	Alappuzha (395), Ernakulam (554), Idukki (85), Kannur (337), Kasargod (138), Kollam (509), Kottayam (423), Kozhikode (691), Malappuram (1054), Palakkad (573), Pathanamthitta (174), Thiruvananthapuram (393), Thrissur (653), Wayanad (135)	None	5213	5,51,669	PTP	
November-20	Alappuzha (395), Ernakulam (554), Idukki (85), Kannur (337), Kasargod (138), Kollam (509), Kottayam (423), Kozhikode (691), Malappuram (1054), Palakkad (573), Pathanamthitta (174), Thiruvananthapuram (393), Thrissur (653), Wayanad (135)	Import	-	5,51,669	T	

=== COVID-19 testing in Kerala as on 11.11.2020 ===
Total tested	Total positive	Routine samples sent	Routine result awaiting
5249865	502719	1693485	-
Type of testing
Routine testing	1693485	Augmented testing	-
Sentinel	4414	Pooled sentinel	0
CB-NAAT	25732	True NAAT	207785
CLIA	1479	Antigen assay	3245241
Airport surveillance	77231	ICMR study	1193

== Charts ==
=== COVID-19 daily graph by total number of cases, recoveries and deaths ===
Total diagnosed cases Active cases Recoveries Deaths

View source data.
View source data.

=== COVID-19 daily graph by source of infection ===
Person-to-person/contact transmission Travel/import cases

View source data.

=== Daily new cases ===
New cases per day

View source data.

=== Active cases ===
Active cases

View source data.

=== COVID-19 daily graph by number of recoveries ===
Total no. of recoveries

View source data.

=== COVID-19 daily graph by number of deaths ===
Total no. of deaths

View source data.

=== COVID-19 daily graph of new cases vs active cases ===
New cases as percentage of active cases 7-day moving average of new cases as percentage of active cases 7-day moving CAGR of active cases

View source data.

=== COVID-19 cases by district ===
View source data.

=== COVID-19 total cases by district ===
==== North Kerala ====
View source data.

=== COVID-19 daily number of testing data ===
View source data.

== Misinformation and conspiracy theories regarding coronavirus ==
Following the reports of coronavirus infection in Kerala, fake news regarding prevention, transmission and cure for coronavirus infection started circulating on the internet, particularly on the social media platform WhatsApp.

One fake message claiming to be an advisory from UNICEF asks people to avoid ice creams to ensure that coronavirus cannot spread in temperatures over 27 degrees.

T. P. Senkumar, former Kerala DGP, posted on social media that the virus cannot survive in the hot and humid conditions in Kerala because the average summer temperature there exceeds 27 °C. Another fake news recommends intake of Vitamin C and drinking frequent sips of water as a preventive measure for coronavirus infection.

Indian National Congress leader and Member of Parliament from Vatakara constituency, K. Muraleedharan claimed that the SARS Cov-2 virus cannot survive temperatures exceeding 30 °C.

Indian Union Muslim League MLA and medical graduate, M. K. Muneer, claimed in the Kerala Assembly that Indians have a special and tough immune system due to living amidst filth and pollution, and were relatively safe from the virus infection.

A post on Facebook claimed falsely that if someone takes a deep breath and holds their breath for more than 10 seconds without coughing, without discomfort, stiffness or tightness, it proves there is no fibrosis in the lungs caused by COVID-19, therefore indicating no infection.

The claim that the vibration generated by clapping together during Janata curfew will kill the virus was debunked by the media. One viral message says that the lifetime of coronavirus is only 12 hours and staying home for 14 hours during Janata curfew break the chain of transmission. Another message claimed that observing Janata curfew will result in the reduction of coronavirus cases by 40%.

== Economic loss ==
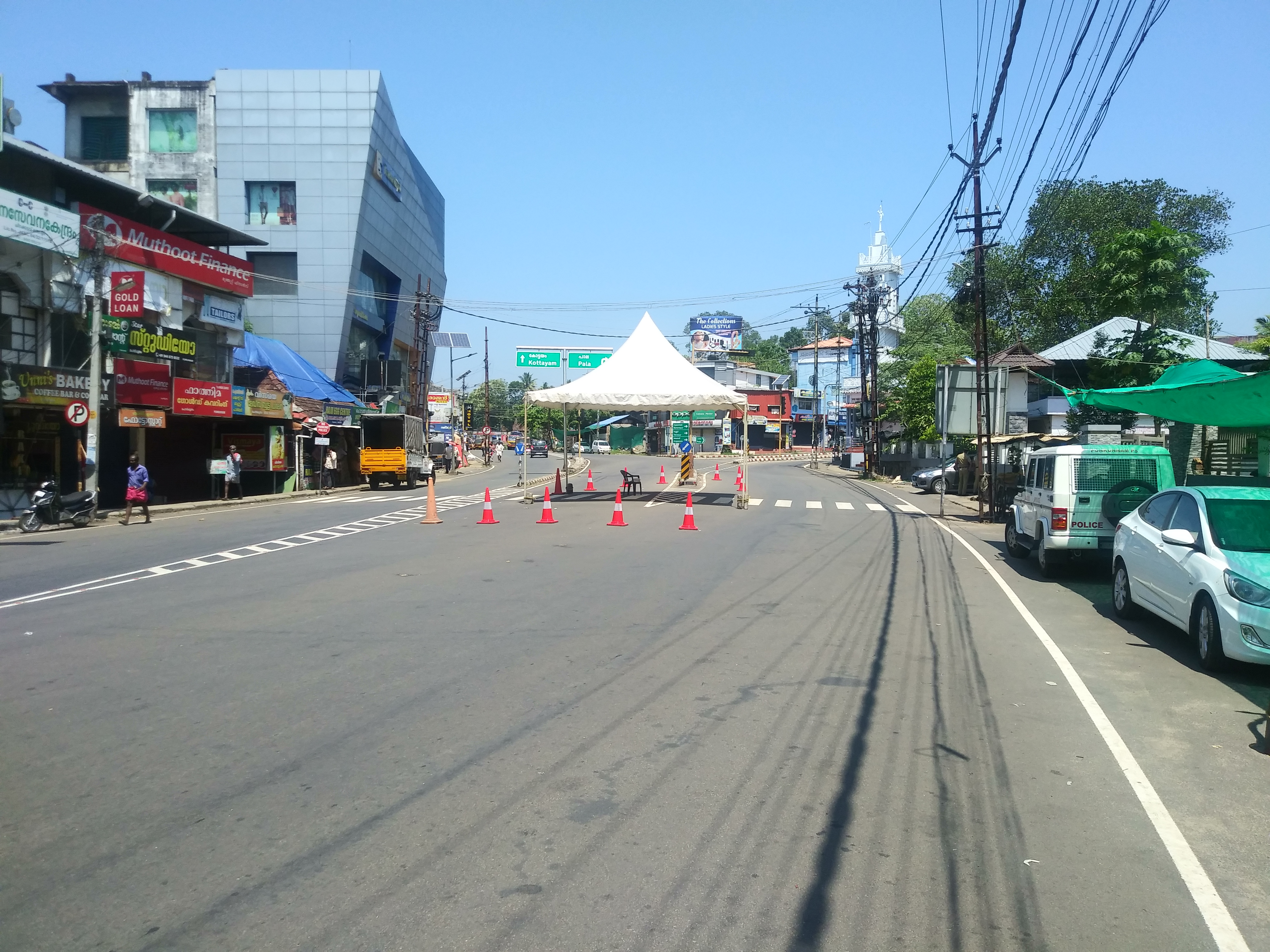
Deserted streets, temporary police checkpoint in Kerala during the lockdown

Tourism is a major contributor to the state's economy. Following coronavirus confirmation in Kerala, there were waves of cancellations of hotel bookings and tour packages. Liquor sales in Kerala is a public sector undertaking, through which the government earns a significant revenue. However, following the outbreak, the sales have gone down, directly hitting the economy. The state's economy is largely dependent on NRI remittances and the economic slowdown of affected Gulf countries is expected to have a direct impact. KSRTC, Kerala's state-owned public transport system has reported losses worth crores due to reduced number of travelers. The practice of social distancing has also brought down the numbers of those who go out on weekends or do shopping, thus affecting local traders and vendors.

== See also ==
- COVID-19 pandemic in India
- COVID-19 pandemic
