= Raiwind Ijtema =

Annual congregation in Lahore

Coordinates: 31.2726097°N 74.1995774°E

Raiwind Ijtema رائے ونڈ اجتماع
- Status: Active
- Genre: Religious Gathering
- Frequency: Annually
- Venue: Raiwind Markaz
- Location: Lahore
- Country: Pakistan
- Years active: 10 April 1954 till today
- Inaugurated: 10 April 1954
- Previous event: 3 - 6 November 2023 (first phase); 10 - 13 November 2023 (second phase)
- Next event: 1 - 3 November 2024 (first phase); 8 - 10 November 2024 (second phase)
- Leader: Maulana Nazar-ur-Rehman

Raiwind Ijtema (Urdu: رائے ونڈ اجتماع) is an annual three-day congregation held at Raiwind Markaz, Lahore, Pakistan.

The congregation is attended by thousands of people from across the world every year. After Dua of last day, groups (Tablighi Jamaat) are formed that go to different parts of the world to preach, and the process continues until the next Ijtema.

Birth : 24 November 1941 - 4 Zilqada 1360 Monday

== History ==
The ijtema, is held at Raiwind Markaz. A typical ijtema starts on a Thursday afternoon and continues for the next three days and ends with an exceptionally long prayer. These gatherings are considered moments of intense blessings by Tabligh Jamaat members and are known to attract members in excess of 2 million in Pakistan. The last day of Ijtema may often see several million people, including devoted celebrities, political and administrative brass of Pakistan. The Pakistani Ijtema is the largest of annual Tablighi Ijtemas after Bangladesh. In 2011 Pakistan divided the Ijtema into two parts and total 1 million People attended each of the two Ijtema.

This gathering lasts for 3 days and then groups of 10 to 15 people in a "Jamaat" (Muslim Group) are made to go around the world to preach the message of Allah. Hundreds of thousands of people attend this religious gathering yearly. Presently the Ameer (principal) of Raiwind Center is Maulana Nazar-ur-Rehman. Since 2007, this congregation has been held semiannually in Pakistan. A few Muslim scholars come from India, and the majority comes from Pakistan. The central theme of the sermons of Ulema is that the success in this life and the hereafter lies in the commandments of Allah and ways of Muhammad. Maulana Tariq Jameel is a scholar who delivers lectures during this annual convention which in Pakistan is called ijtema.

Tabligh Jamaat encourages its followers to follow the pattern of spending "an evening, one night, three days, a week, or forty days, 40 continuous days a year, and ultimately 120 days at least once in their lives engaged in tabligh missions". During the course of these tours, members are generally seen dressed in simple, loose-clothing. The Jamaat's walking on streets can be identified by its members carrying sleeping bags and packs of bare minimum cookery on their backs and walking in a straight line along the pathways and footpaths, when they are aiming to arrive at a destination by foot. These members use mosques as their base during their stays but particular mosques, due to more frequent tablighi activities, have come to be specifically associated with this organisation. These mosques generally hold the periodic, smaller scale convocations for neighbourhood members.

During their stay in mosques, these jamaats conduct a daily gasht, which involves visiting local neighbourhoods, preferably with the help of a local guide. They invite people to attend the Maghrib prayer at their mosque and those who attend are delivered a sermon after the prayers, which essentially outlines the Six Principles. They urge the attendees to spend time in tabligh for self reformation and the propagation of Islam. Also the regular activities like eating, sleeping etc. are also carried out in the mosques.

Generally, the assumed role of these jamaat members cycle in a way that they may be engaged as a preacher, a cook or as a cleaner at other times. Among Tabligh Jamaat members, this is generally referred to as khidmat which essentially connotes to serving their companions and freeing them for tablighi engagements. The members of the Jamaat are assigned these roles based on the day's mashwara. The markaz keeps records of each jamaat and its members, the identity of whom is verified from their respective mosques. Mosques are used to assist the tablighi activities of individual jamaats that voluntarily undertake preaching missions. Members of a jamaat, ideally, pay expenses themselves so as to avoid financial dependence on anyone. However, reverent members may at times also sponsor expenses of some of their "brothers" who might be devoted members but without necessary financial means.

In 2011 the congregation divided into two phases due to administrative and security reasons.

== See also ==
- Bishwa Ijtema
