= Kakrail =

Kakrail কাকরাইল
- Neighbourhood
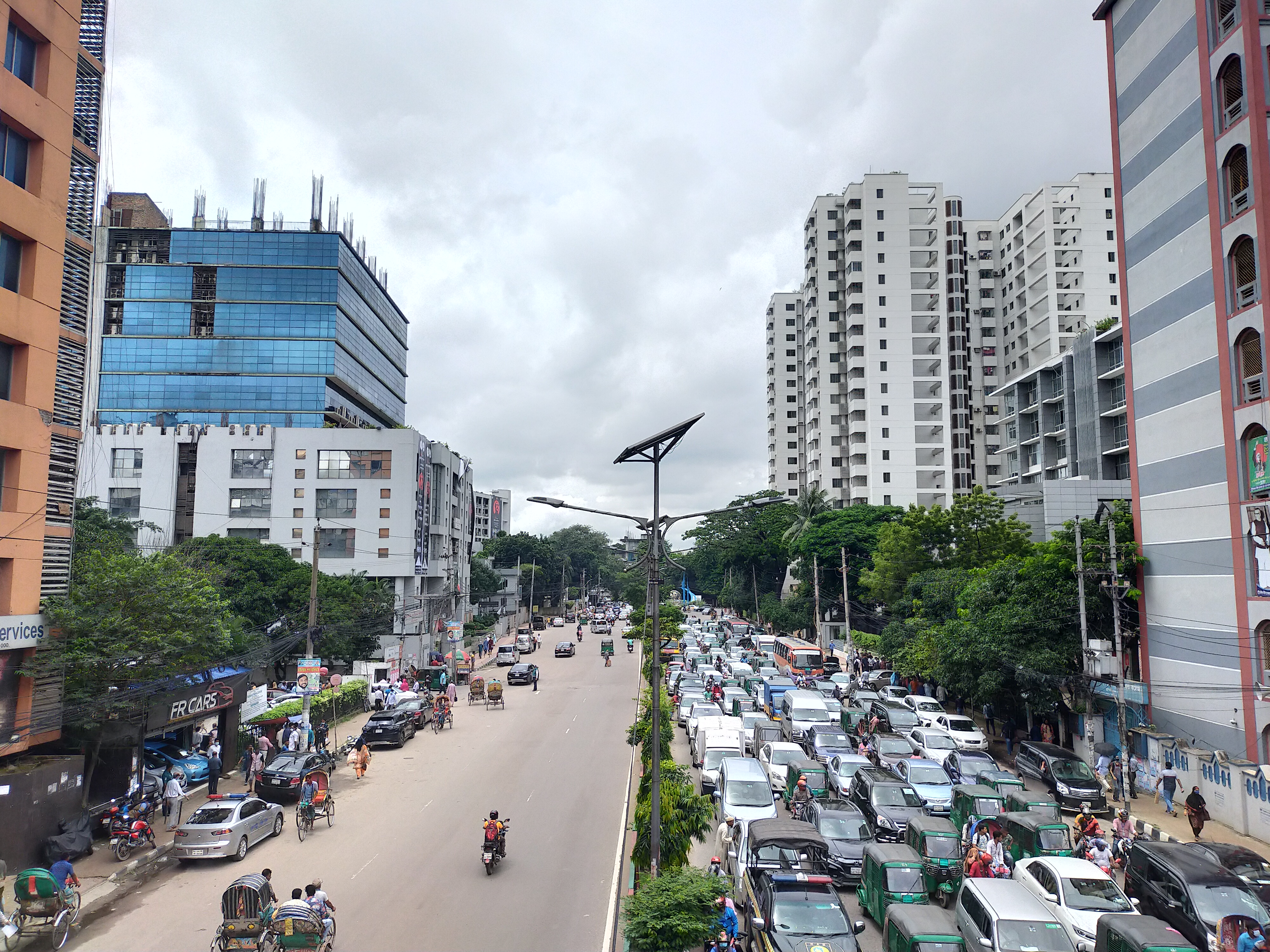
- Skyline of Kakrail
- Interactive map of Kakrail
- Coordinates: 23°44′20″N 90°24′27″E
- Country: Bangladesh
- Division: Dhaka Division
- District: Dhaka District
- Time zone: UTC+6 (BST)
- Postal Code: 1000

Kakrail (Bengali: কাকরাইল) is a neighbourhood in Dhaka. It is under Ramna Thana and falls under the jurisdiction of Dhaka South City Corporation. Over time, Kakrail has grown into a mostly residential area, with apartment plots and schools, but subsequently, several NGOs and government offices have been set up there.

== Etymology ==
Historian Muntassir Mamoon theorized that Kakrail may be named after a British commissioner to Dacca, Cockerell. The name "Kakrail" could be a Bengali corruption of his name.

== History ==
As Dhaka expanded after the 1947 Partition of Bengal, Kakrail became a residential colony.

A mosque in the area, the Kakrail Mosque, became the markaz (headquarters) of the Tablighi Jamaat in East Bengal. Their Bishwa Ijtema was held there annually starting in 1954. The gathering was moved to Tongi in 1966 when it outgrew the Kakrail Mosque.

Kakrail has become part of Dhaka's main central business district. It became an early site of hotel-centered prostitution. By 2005, it was also one of the main places in the city for streetwalking.

A posterwallah interviewed by anthropologist Lotte Hoek named Kakrail as the second best place in the city for putting up film posters. A large number of potential moviegoers pass through its densely choked streets, and are forced to do so slowly enough that they ha

ve an opportunity to take in the posters.

== Geography ==
Kakrail is located in south central Dhaka. To the north of Kakrail lies Siddheswari. Shantinagar of Paltan Thana is to the east and northeast of Kakrail. Kakrail touches Shahbag Thana to the south via Segunbagicha. Ramna Park lies to Kakrail's west.
