= Haji Abdul Wahab =

Islamic preacher of Pakistan

Muhammad Abdul Wahhab حاجی محمد عبد الوہاب

3rd Amir of Tablighi Jamaat in Pakistan
- In office 1992 – 18 November 2018
- Preceded by: Haji Muhammad Bashir
- Succeeded by: Maulana Nazar-ur-Rehman

Personal life
- Born: 1 January 1923 Delhi, British India
- Died: 18 November 2018 (aged 95) Lahore, Pakistan
- Main interest: Dawah
- Education: Islamia College
- Occupation: Islamic preacher

Religious life
- Religion: Islam
- Denomination: Sunni
- Jurisprudence: Hanafi
- Movement: Tablighi Jamaat

Muslim leader
- Influenced by: Abdul Qadir Raipuri; Muhammad Ilyas Kandhlawi; Muhammad Yusuf Kandhlawi; Zakariyya Kandhlawi; Inamul Hasan Kandhlawi

Haji Abdul Wahhab (Urdu: حاجی عبد الوہاب, 1 January 1923 – 18 November 2018) was an Islamic preacher and the emir of Tablighi Jamaat in Pakistan.

== Early life and education ==
Muhammad Abdul Wahhab was born in Delhi, British India, in 1923 into a Rajput family originally from Saharanpur in Uttar Pradesh.

The family moved to Lahore following the 1947 partition, where he graduated from the Islamia College and became a government employee.

After graduation he worked as a tehsildar in pre-partition India. In his youth he also worked for Majlis-e-Ahrar-e-Islam, and was influenced by Abdul Qadir Raipuri (1878–1962). He was the president of Majlis-e-Ahrar Burewala.

== Career ==
=== Tabligh Jamaat ===
Abdul Wahhab joined the Tabligh Jamaat during the life of its founder, Muhammad Ilyas Kandhlawi. He arrived at Nizamuddin markaz on 1 January 1944. He got the sohbah of Maulana Ilyas for six months. He left his job to devote his time and effort to the Jamaat, and he was one of the first five people in Pakistan who offered their entire life for doing Tabligh work. He was a direct companion of Maulana Muhammad Ilyas Kandhlawi, Yusuf Kandhlawi, and Inamul Hasan Kandhlawi.

Muhammad Shafi Quraishi (1903–1971) was the first regular amir of the Tablighi Jamaat in Pakistan; he was succeeded by Haji Muhammad Bashir (1919–1992). Abdul Wahhab succeeded Bashir as the third regular amir for Pakistan. He was based at Raiwind Markaz, the movement's headquarters in the country, where he headed a shura (council). He was also a member of the movement's alami shura (world council) based in Nizamuddin, Delhi, India.

He was also related with the Qadiriyah Sufi order through his mentor, Shaykh Abdul Qadir Raipuri.

=== Negotiations with Pakistani Taliban ===
In October 2013 it was reported that the name of Haji Abdul Wahhab was suggested to head a Loya Jirga in preparation for peace talks with the Pakistani Taliban. In February 2014 it was reported that during consultations with a committee, TTP commanders of different factions recommended that the names of Haji Abdul Wahhab, Maulana Sami'ul Haq, Dr. Abdul Qadeer Khan, and other leaders be added in the government peace committee.

== Reception ==
As of the 2014/2015 issue, he was ranked #10 in The Muslim 500, a list of the 500 most influential Muslims in the world, due to his leadership of the Tablighi Jamaat.

== Death and funeral ==
Haji Abdul Wahab died on 18 November 2018. He was buried in a graveyard adjacent to Tableeghi Markaz (Headquarter) at Raiwind the same day.

== See also ==
- List of Deobandis
