= Bishwa Ijtema =

Worldwide Muslim gathering in Bangladesh

Coordinates: 23.8914722°N 90.3968637°E

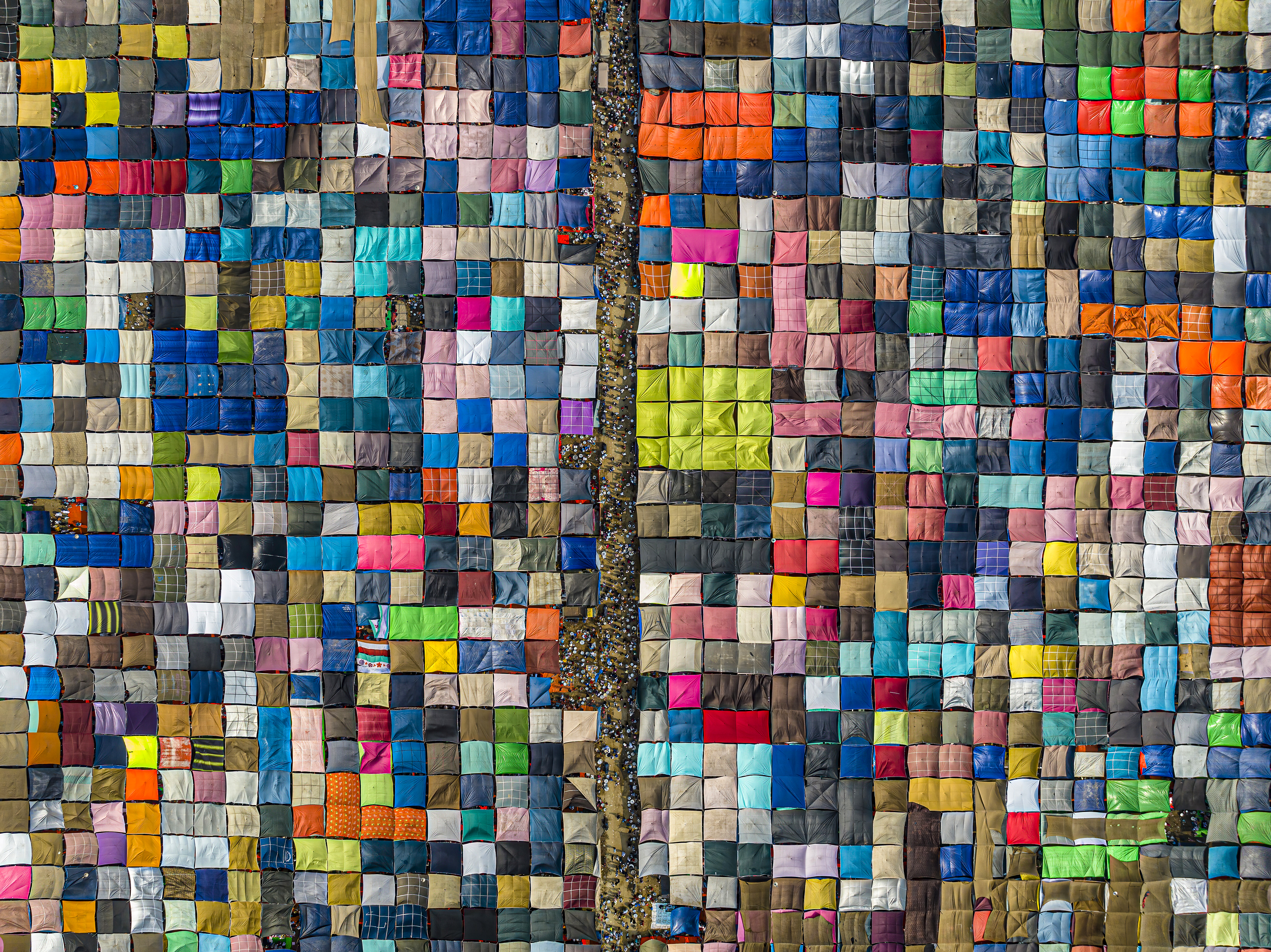
- An aerial view of the multi-colored Ijtema tents on the banks of the Turag in Tongi in 2023
- Native name: বিশ্ব ইজতেমা
- English name: 'Global congregation'
- Date: 1969 to present
- Venue: Bishwa Ijtema Ground, Tongi, Gazipur, Bangladesh
- Also known as: Tablighi Ijtema تبلیغی اجتماع; Ālmi Ijtema عالمی اجتماع (If organised worldwide)
- Cause: To congregate the followers of Tablighi Jamaat annually; Islamic revivalism
- Patron: Muhammad Ilyas Kandhlawi
- Organised by: Tablighi Jamaat and other associated muslim organisations and madrassahs with the help of the Government of Bangladesh

The Bishwa Ijtema (Bengali: বিশ্ব ইজতেমা, lit. 'Global congregation') is an annual gathering of Muslims in Tongi, by the banks of the River Turag, in the outskirts of Dhaka, Bangladesh. The Ijtema, organized by the Bangladeshi branch of the Tablighi Jamaat, is considered a demonstration of Muslim unity, solidarity, and mutual love and respect and an opportunity to reiterate their commitment to Islamic values. It is the biggest festival by population in Bengali culture, one of the largest peaceful gatherings in the world, and the second-largest Muslim gathering, with 5 million adherents, after the Arba'in pilgrimage's 15–20 million attendees in Iraq, both surpassing the 2–3 million worshipers who participate in the Hajj, considered to be one of the five pillars of Islam, in Saudi Arabia. Bishwa Ijtema is a modern event in which Muslim participation is voluntary.

The Ijtema is a three-day congregation during which devotees perform daily prayers and listen to scholars reciting and interpreting verses from the Quran, the central religious text. Speakers include Islamic scholars from various countries. It culminates in the Akheri Munajat (concluding supplication or final prayer), in which millions of devotees raise their hands and pray to God (Allah) for world peace. Al-Quds Al-Arabi compared Ijtema with Kaaba to the poor people of the region.

The Ijtema is non-political, and draws people of all persuasions. It is attended by devotees from 150 countries. The majority of its devotees come from across Bangladesh, the world's third-largest Muslim majority country. Despite being larger than Hajj, the obligatory Muslim pilgrimage, the voluntary Bishwa Ijtema remains largely unknown and underreported in the West. During the Ijtema, free meals and accommodation are provided by volunteers.

== Etymology ==
The phrase Bishwa Ijtema is made up from the words of two different languages, Bishwa from Bengali and Ijtema from Arabic. Bishwa means "world" or "global" in Bengali. Ijtema (Arabic: اجتماع) means "public gathering" or "conference" in Arabic. Ijtema is a type of voluntary Islamic congregation organised by Islamic organisations in association with a large number of Muslims.

Together it translates "world conference" or "global congregation".

== Organization ==
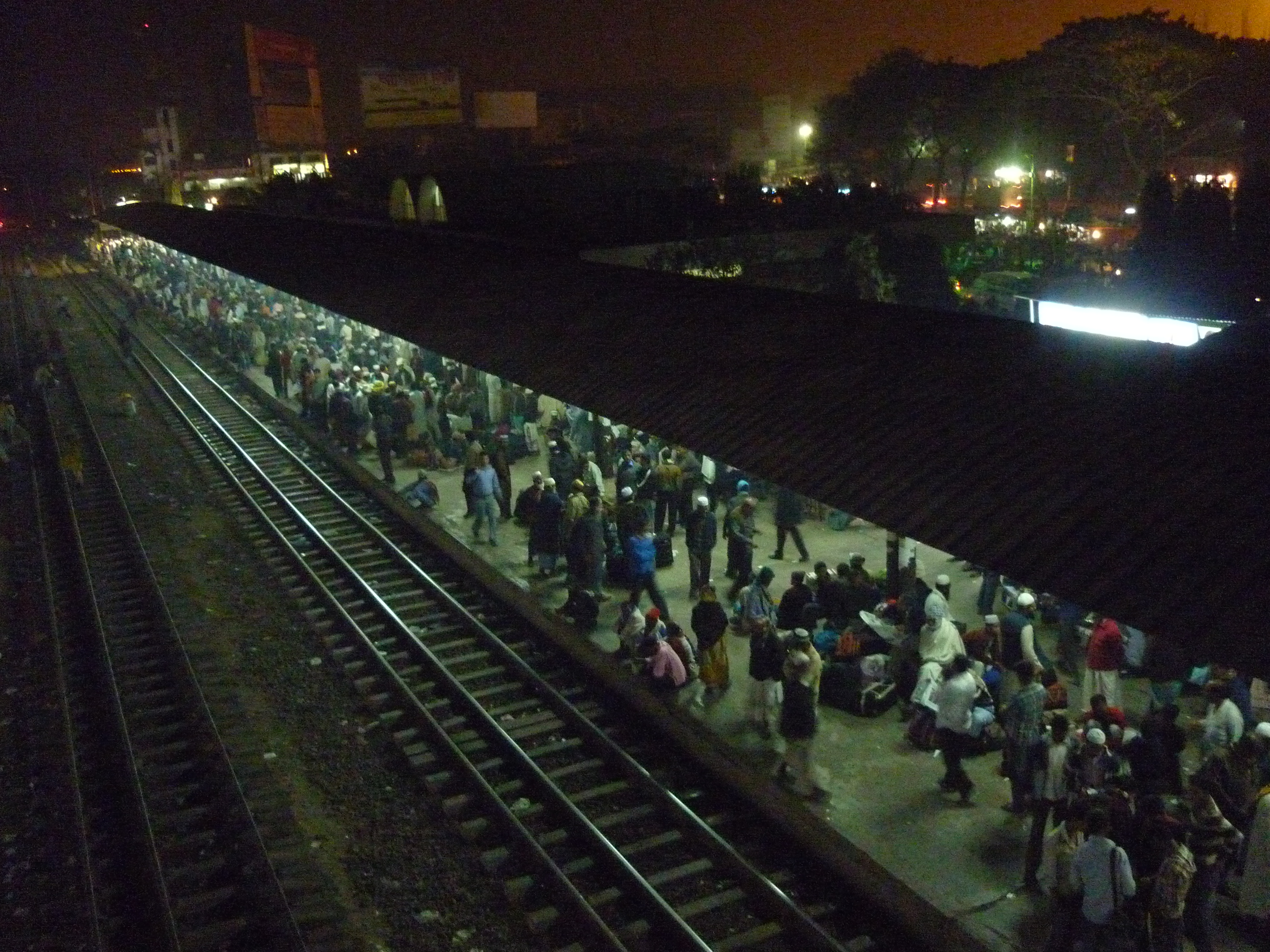
Devotees at Dhaka Airport railway station

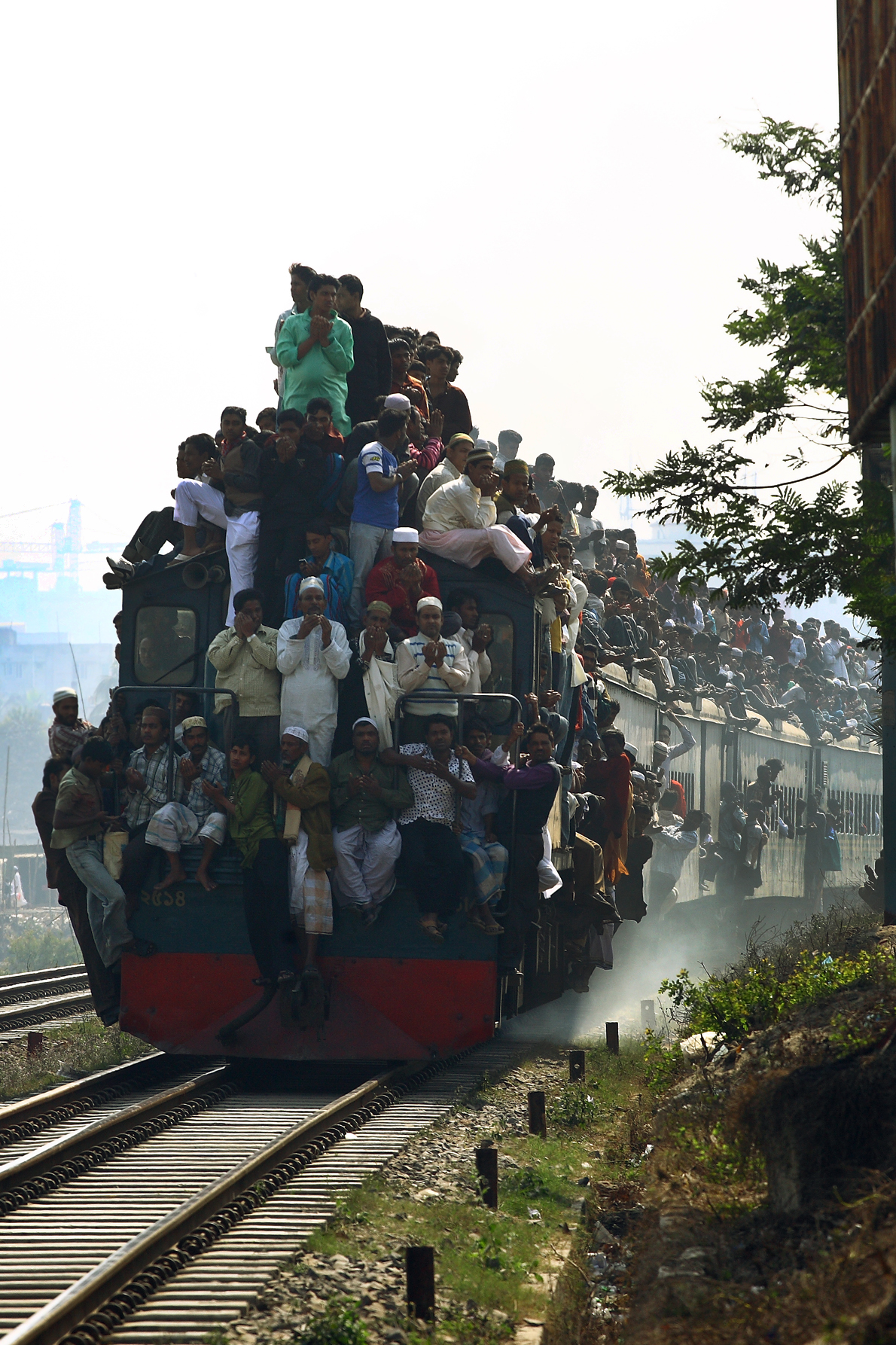
Devotees supplicating Akheri Munajat travelling on a train

The event is organized generally in January, occasionally in February, by the Bangladeshi branch of the Tablighi Jamaat, a Deobandi movement.

The congregation takes place in an area which spans over five square kilometers in Tongi, an outer suburb north of Dhaka. An extensive tent is created in the area with the help of the Government of Bangladesh. Transport is provided by state-run companies, including Biman Bangladesh Airlines, the Bangladesh Railway and the Bangladesh Road Transport Corporation (BRTC). The Bangladesh Armed Forces assists by arranging infrastructure. Law enforcement agencies such as Bangladesh Police and Rapid Action Battalion (RAB) are responsible for ensuring the safety and security at the Ijtema ground and the surrounding vicinity. Despite the large number of devotees living within a confined space, generally there are very few problems of sanitation, cooking, and internal movements. It is believed to be possible because of the minimalist approach adopted by the devotees. Devotees reduce their own requirements and develop a respect for others' requirements. During the Final Prayer, huge crowds stretch from the Ijtema ground in Tongi into the Dhaka metropolitan area. Schools and offices are declared closed on the occasion.

== Process ==
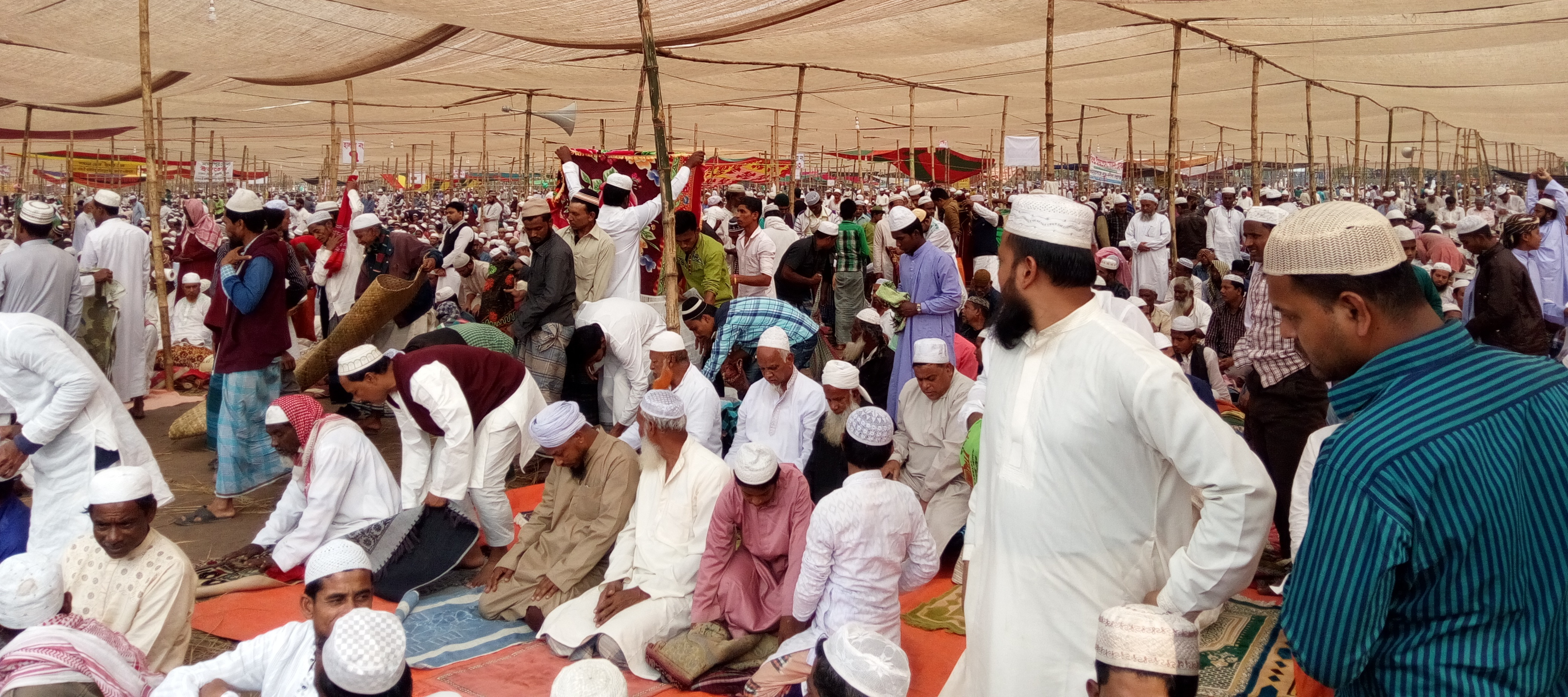
Inside view of khitta

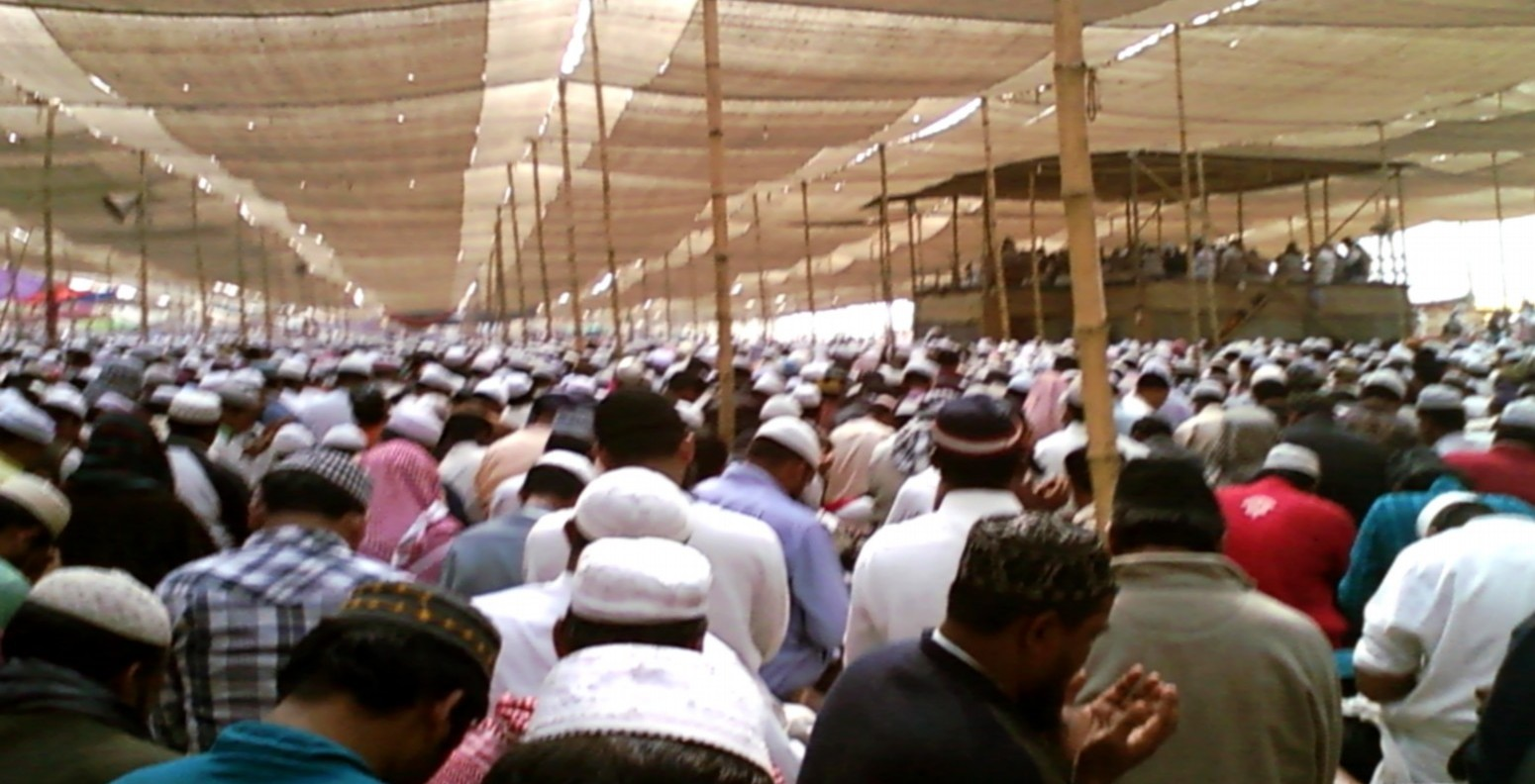
Devotees praying the Akheri Munajat

The whole gathering place is an open field, which is prepared for the gathering with canopies fixed on bamboo poles. Tin canopies and tin fences are provided for foreign guests only. The gathering place is divided first by khitta and then by pole number. Participants identify their location with khitta number and pole number. There is a separate secured area for foreign visitors, where volunteers ensure strict security, no armed forces are allowed to enter.

Usually a phrase of Ijtema last for at least three days, usually from Friday to Sunday. It starts with Ambayan (opening sermon) after the Jumua prayers and ends with Akheri Munajat (closing prayer). Many ordinary Muslims do not spend the three days in Ijtema, but only attend the Friday prayer or the last prayer; However, most people participate in the last prayer. The Prime Minister, President, Leader of Opposition and other leaders of Bangladesh participate in Akheri Munajat separately. The worshipers participated in the last prayer with intense devotion and pray to Allah for forgiveness. During Akhiri Munajat, the banks of the Turag River turn into a tide of worshippers. Akheri Munajat is generally delivered in Urdu, but since 2018, was given in Bengali, Bangladesh‘s official language, for the first time since 1980.

== History ==
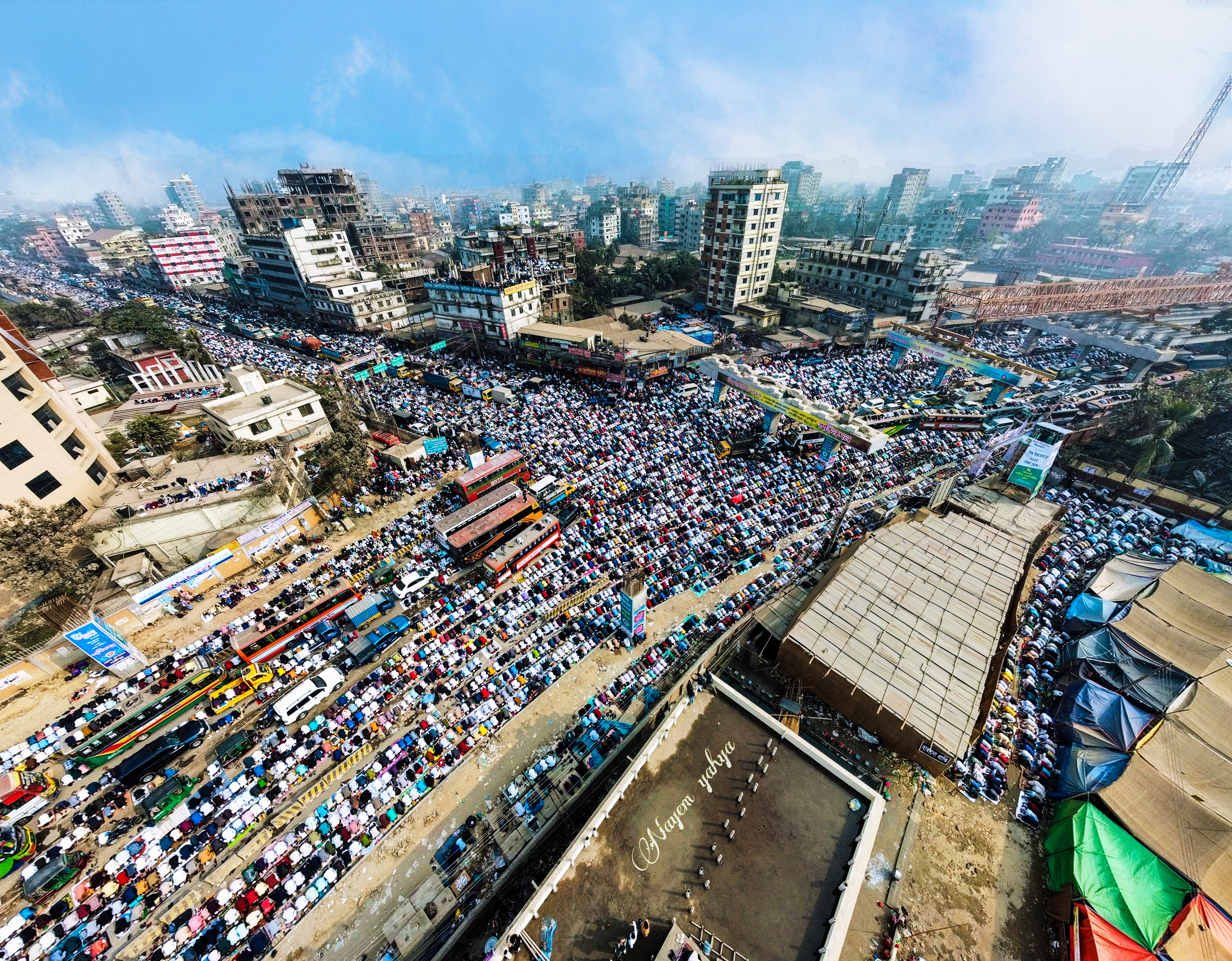
A drone view of 2023 Ijtema

In 1946, the first annual conference of Tablighi Jamaat or Ijtema in the region what today called Bangladesh was held at Kakrail Mosque near Ramna Park in Dhaka. In 1954, after the Bengali Tabhlighi Jamaat movement officially started their activities in Dhaka, East Bengal, the first Ijtemas were organized by them at Haji Camp in Chittagong (1954) and in Siddhirganj, Narayanganj (1958), followed by Ijtemas at the old venue of Ramna Race Course in Dhaka in 1960, 1962 and 1965. In 1967, Due to the increasing numbers of participants, the government of East Pakistan allowed organizers to schedule the event annually in the current venue at Pagar village field in Tongi by the River Turag. Since then, the event became known as the "Bishwa Ijtema", attendees from different countries of the world took part. Before this, the it was simply called "Ijtema". From 1972 onwards, the Bishwa Ijtema is being held in the large open field of 160 acre, along the north-eastern bank of the River Turag (Qahar Darya), allotted by the Government of Bangladesh.

Since 2012, due to the accommodation demands, the Tablighi Jamaat authorities has bifurcated the Ijtema into two phases in order to better manage the growing number of participants.

The Bishwa Ijtema in 2024 was held in two phases to accommodate the vast number of attendees. The first phase took place from February 2nd to 4th, and the second phase from February 9th to 11th. The opening sermon for the first phase was delivered by Maulana Ahmad Buttullah of Pakistan. The event featured sermons and educational discourses by prominent Islamic scholars such as Maulana Ziaul Haq from Pakistan and Maulana Kari Jobayer. Maulana Saad Kandhalvi's eldest son, Yusuf bin Saad Kandhalvi, delivered the Jummah sermon during the second phase. The second phase of the Bishwa Ijtema saw hundreds of thousands of Muslims from home and abroad, including attendees from around 56 countries, gathering for Jummah prayers along the banks of the Turag River in Tongi, Gazipur.

It was reported that during the first phase of the Ijtema, 14 elderly devotees died at the venue.

In December 2024, clashes broke out at the venue between the factions of Tablighi Jamaat headed by Maulana Zubair Ahmed, imam of the Kakrail mosque & Maulana Muhammad Saad Kandhalvi, which lead to the death of 8 & injuring 50 others. The venue had to be emptied by the police & military personnel. Followers of Ahmed have demanded that the interim government declare the followers of Kandhalvi to be a 'terrorist organisation'.

Biswa Ijtema 2026 is scheduled to happen in India in January, 2026. Biswa Ijtema 2026 (Indian version) is scheduled to happen in Puinan village of Dadpur Police Station area of Hooghly District of the State of West Bengal from 2nd January to 5th January, 2026 and in Bangladesh in March, 2026 (tentative).

== Number of devotees ==
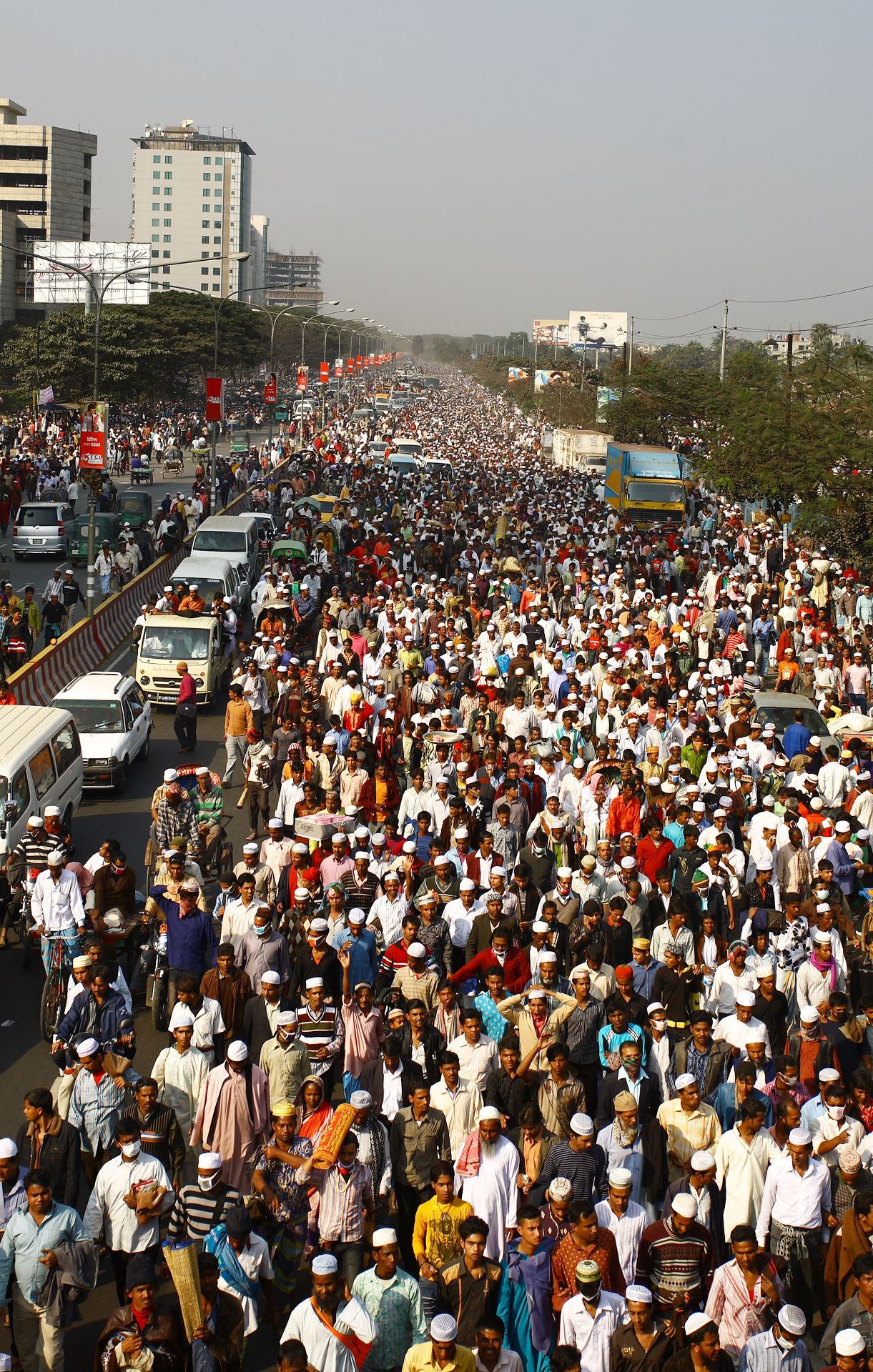
Devotees in the Dhaka metropolitan area

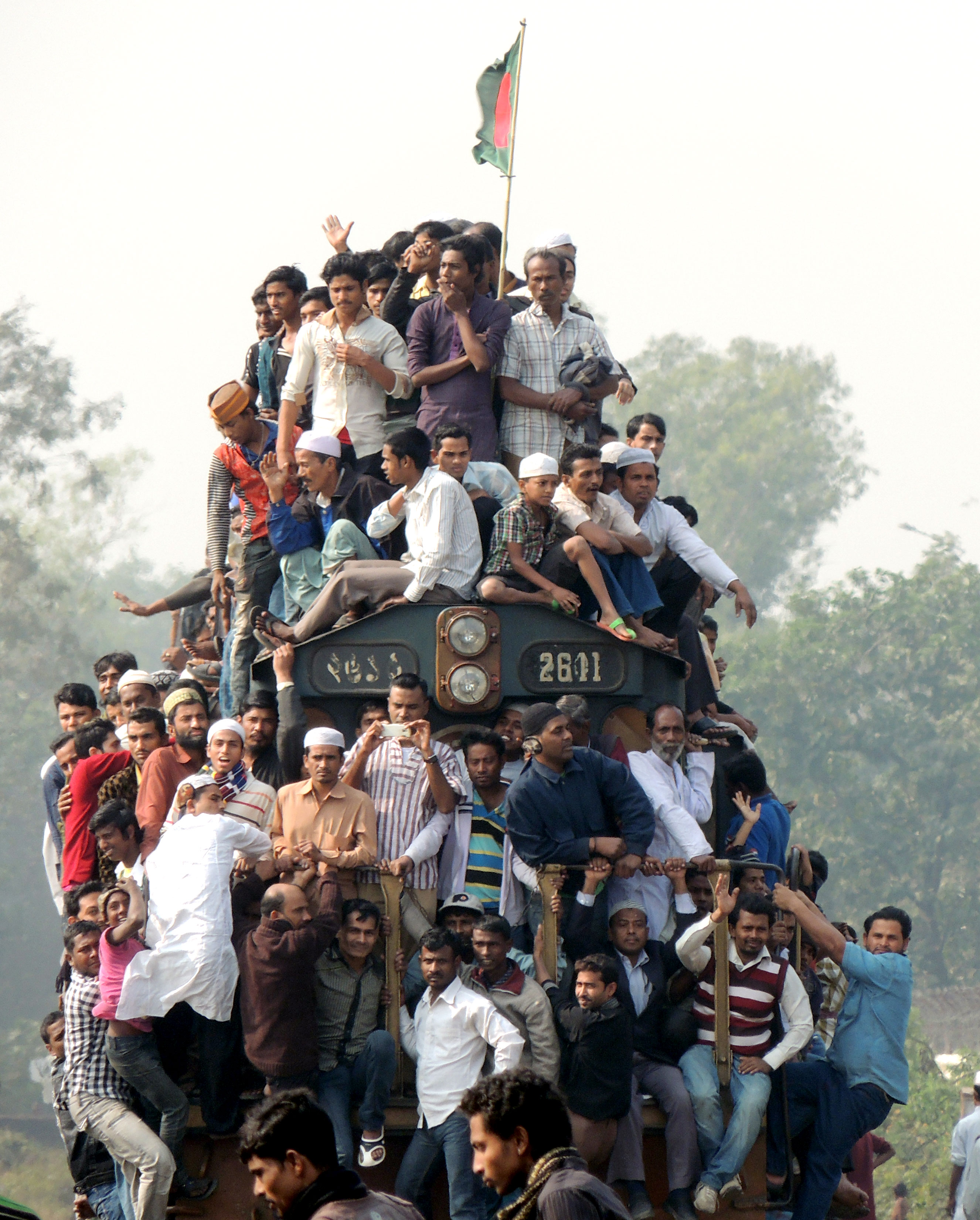
People returning home in train from Ijtema 2013

In 2001, the number of attendees was 2 million. In 2010, the number was 5 million. However, number declined to 2 million in 2018, but increased to 4 million in 2023.

=== Foreign devotees ===
Between 20,000 and 50,000 foreign devotees from various regions, including the South Asian subcontinent, Russia and Central Asia, Europe, Southeast Asia, the Middle East, North Africa and the United States, were estimated to attend in 2007.

== Overcrowding and weather ==
Due to increasing overcrowding, the Ijtema was divided into two segments with an interval of seven days from 2010. Attendants from 32 designated Bangladeshi districts are permitted in the first phase. The second phase allows devotees from the remaining districts of the country. Foreign devotees are allowed in both phases.

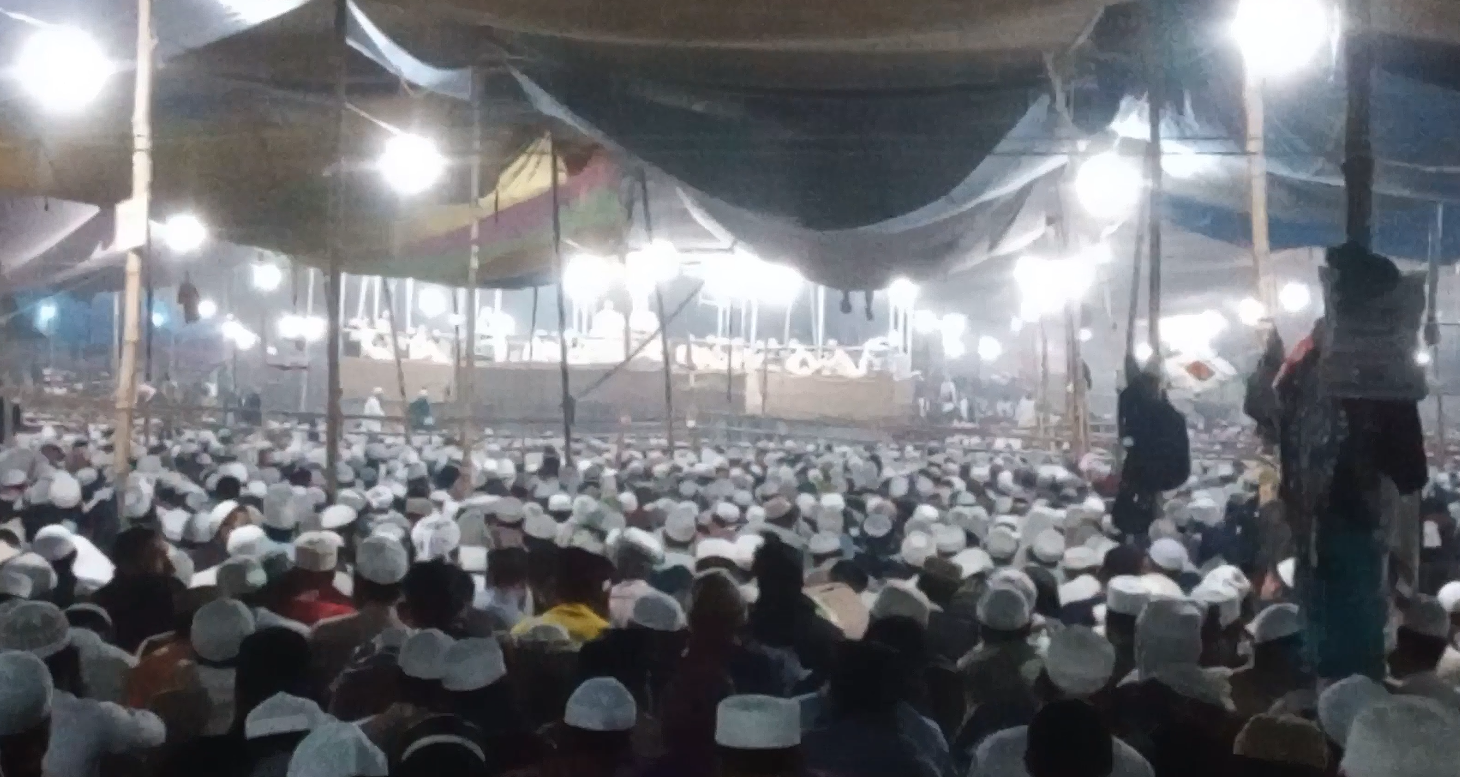
Main stage of Bishwa Ijtema

Due to increasing overcrowding, the Ijtema was further divided into four segments from 2015. The first phase is for devotees from 16 designated Bangladeshi districts. The second phase allows devotees from another 16 designated Bangladeshi districts. Devotees from the remaining 32 districts of the country were to join the following year.

In 2008, the event had to be cut short to only one day due to rain and cold weather which left three attendees dead.

== See also ==
- Raiwind Ijtima
- Dawah
- Spread of islam
- Islamization
- Darul Uloom Deoband
- Nerul Aalami Markaz
- Kakrail Mosque
- Raiwind Markaz
