= Raiwind Markaz =

Mosque in Punjab, Pakistan

- تبلیغی مرکز رائے ونڈ
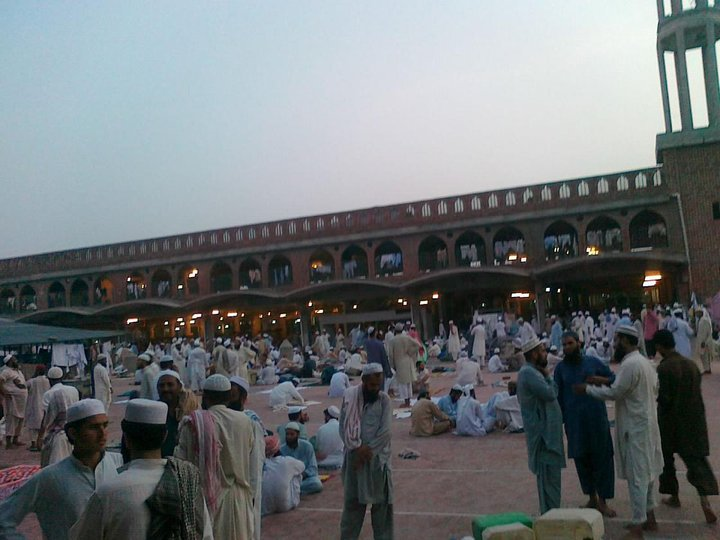

- Location within Pakistan

Religion
- Affiliation: Sunni Islam (Deobandi)
- District: Lahore
- Province: Punjab
- Ecclesiastical or organisational status: Mosque, Darul uloom
- Leadership: Nazar-ur-Rehman

Location
- Location: Lahore, Pakistan
- Country: Pakistan
- Coordinates: 31.1524°N 74.1320°E

Architecture
- Type: Mosque
- Style: Islamic Modern
- Founder: Muhammad Abdul Wahhab
- Completed: 2006

Specifications
- Capacity: 150,000
- Length: 500
- Width: 410
- Minaret: 2
- Minaret height: 40 m

Raiwind Markaz (Punjabi: مرکز رائےونڈ ) is a complex consisting of a main mosque, Islamic madrasa, and residential areas located in Raiwind city, near Lahore, Pakistan, and is the home of the Tablighi Jamaat in Pakistan. It attracts many people to its yearly gathering, including international visitors.

== Annual gathering (Ijtema) ==
It is hosted in the Ijitimah Gah near to the Markaz (5 km from Markaz). It is among the biggest gatherings of Muslims in Pakistan in a single location. More than 2 million Muslims from Pakistan and all over the world come to this place, which is planned and managed by the Raiwind Markaz. Because of large number of people participating it is divided now into four parts, each year two parts and remaining two parts next year will be held, each part lasting three days, and on the last day Special Prayer is held. There is no restriction for foreigners to come to any part of the Raiwind Markaz Ijtima. Scholars of different countries are invited on these days.

The ijtema is for all sects of Muslims. The only purpose of this annual gathering is to make one ummah and to strongly believe in Allah (الله دی ذات نال سب کجھ ہوں دا یقین ) "Allah di zaat naal sub kujh hon da yaqqeen". The great Muslim scholars from India and Pakistan as well as from other parts of the Muslim world also deliver speeches. There is a separate place for foreigners who have a translator alongside them.

== See also ==
- Tablighi Jamaat
- Nerul Markaz
- Darul Uloom Deoband
- Kakrail Mosque
