= Tariq Jamil =

Pakistani Islamic cleric, preacher (born 1953)

Maulana Tariq Jamil PP
- طارق جمیل

Personal life
- Born: Mian Channu, Punjab, Pakistan
- Education: Madrassah Arabiyyah, Raiwind, Lahore
- Occupation: Islamic scholar
- Website: tariqjamilofficial.com

Religious life
- Religion: Islam
- Denomination: Sunni
- Jurisprudence: Hanafi
- Movement: Deobandi

Muslim leader
- Awards: Pride of Performance
- Tariq Jamil delivering a religious sermon Maulana Tariq Jamil delivering a religious sermon while describing one of the background of Day of Resurrection (Yawm al-qiyāmah), quoted from Hadith (in Urdu)

YouTube information
- Channel: Tariq Jamil
- Years active: 2017–present
- Genre: Islamic
- Subscribers: 8.82 million
- Views: 880 million
- Last updated: 19 March 2025

Tariq Jamil (Punjabi, Urdu: طارق جمیل, romanized: Ṭāriq Jamīl; Punjabi pronunciation: [t̪aːɾɪk d͡ʒəmil]) is a Pakistani Islamic cleric, preacher and member of the Tablighi Jama'at. The recipient of the Pride of Performance award, Tariq Jamil has been named in The 500 Most Influential Muslims year since 2012. In the 2024 edition of the publication, he was ranked 34th most influential Muslim alive and topped YouGov polls in 2018 and 2020 for Pakistan’s most admired man.

== Early life and education ==
Tariq Jamil was born in early 1950s in Mian Channu, Multan district (at the time) Punjab and belongs to a well-off Punjabi Rajput family of large landholders descending from Prithviraj Chauhan, a 12th-century ruler. His family ruled Tulamba, a town close to Mian Channu, during the reign of Sher Shah Suri in the 16th century, who also distributed the lands around Tulamba. His younger brother Dr. Muhammad Tahir Kamal Sahu is a well-known cardiologist, working at the Punjab Institute of Cardiology in Lahore.

Jamil completed his primary education at Central Model School, Lahore. He is an alumnus of Government College University, Lahore, and received his Islamic education from Jamia Arabia, Raiwind, where he studied the Qur’an, hadiths, Sufism, logic and Islamic jurisprudence.

Jamil enrolled in King Edward Medical College, Lahore after finishing a pre-medical education from Government College Lahore, but he left the college without completing his MBBS when he decided to pursue religious education.

== Career ==
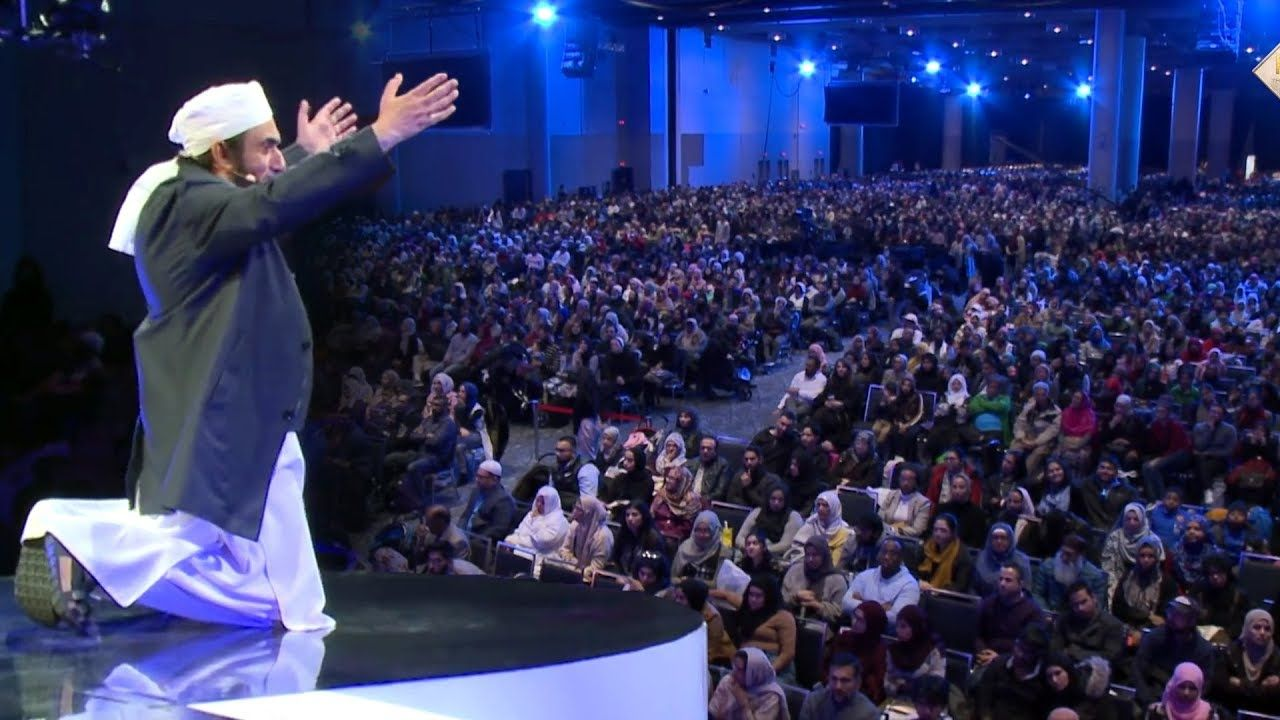
Tariq jamil at RIS conference in Toronto, Canada

Jamil has delivered religious sermons internationally and comes from a school of thought called Deoband. He supports ethnic and sectarian harmony.

Jamil's sermons focus on "self-purification, avoidance of violence, observance of Allah's orders and pursuing the way of Prophet Muhammad".

Jamil has been named as one as of The 500 Most Influential Muslims in the world by the Royal Aal al-Bayt Institute for Islamic Thought in Jordan every year since 2012.

== Views on COVID ==
In April 2020, he blamed God's wrath at dishonesty in society and the immodesty of women for the outbreak and spread of COVID-19. Besides praying for the welfare of the country and an end to vice, he said: "when a Muslim's daughter practices immodesty and the youth (boys) indulges in immorality, then Allah’s torment is unto such a nation."

Human rights proponents and other members of Pakistani society condemned the remarks. Human Rights Minister Shireen Mazari responded by saying "misogynistic' and 'ignorant' comments blaming women and youth for the ongoing coronavirus crisis were 'absolutely unacceptable".

== Business affairs ==
Jamil launched his flagship clothing brand named MTJ Brand. It was launched in March 2021. Its headquarters are located in Karachi. It is claimed the revenue from the business is used to fund his madressahs, and build schools and hospitals in the country. Jamil also launched the Maulana Tariq Jamil Foundation, which is a non-profit organization in Tulamba, Khanewal. It is a project that gathers funds for social work, health, and education to serve the people of Pakistan.

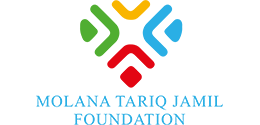
MTJ Foundation

== Awards ==
Year	Award	Category	Result	Note	Ref.
2020	Pride of Performance	Education (religion)	Won	Awarded by Arif Alvi, president of Pakistan	

== Bibliography ==
- Jamil, Tariq (2014). مجموعہ بیاناتِ جمیل [Majmua Bayanat-e-Jameel] (in Urdu). ISBN 978-9691199361.
- ————— (2014). ہمارے مسائل کا حل [Hamare Masail Ka Hal] (in Urdu). HarperCollins. ISBN 978-9697378951.
- ————— (2018). گلدستۂ اہل بیت [Guldasta-e-Ahle Bayt] (in Urdu). Pakistan Daily.
