= Ijtema =

South Asian Islamic congregation

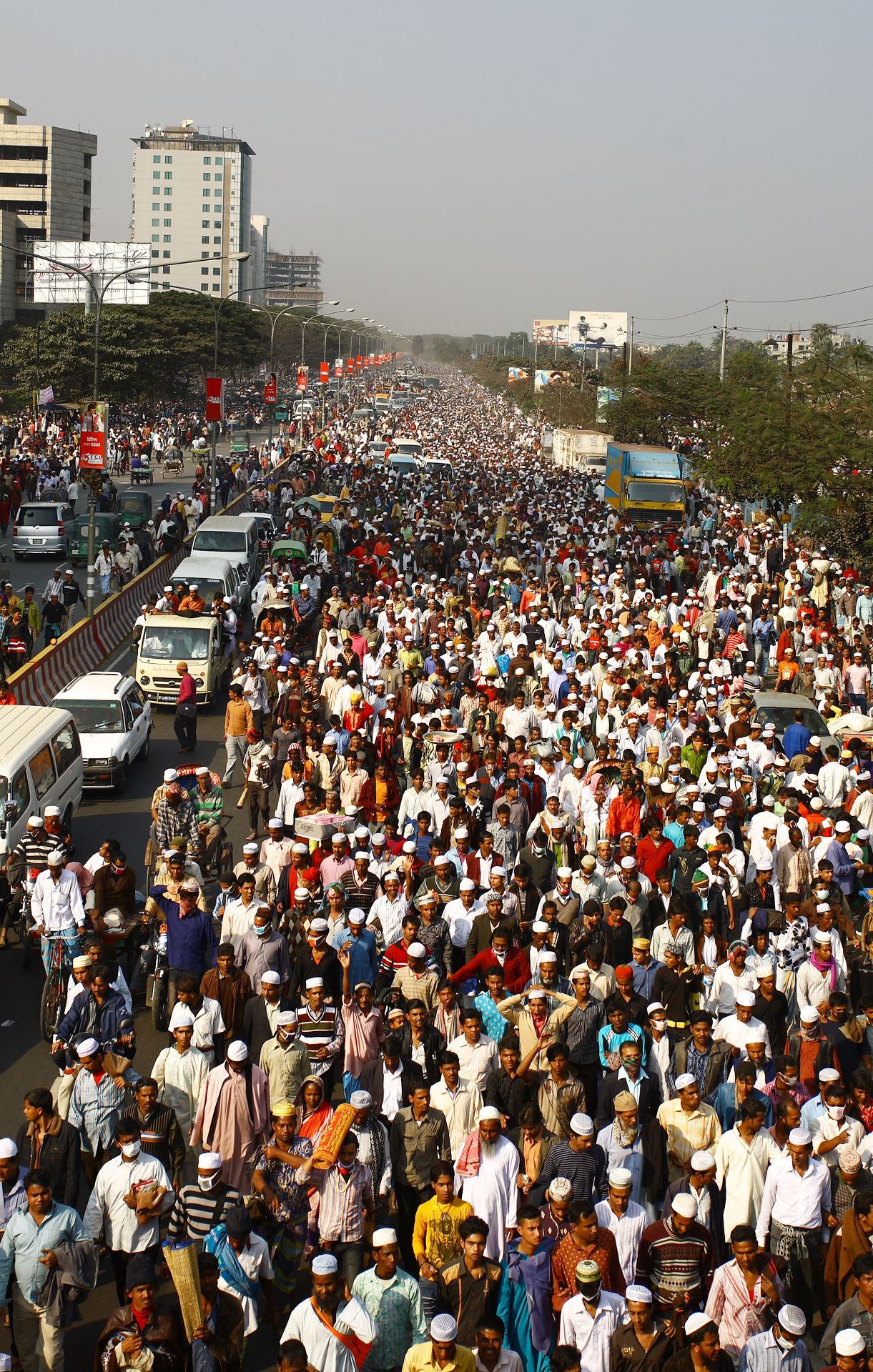
- Bishwa ijtema, world's second largest Islamic congregation
- Arabic: اجتماع
- Romanization: ijtimāʿ
- Literal meaning: "conference"/"congregation"

Ijtema (Arabic: اجتماع) is an Islamic congregation organised by Islamic organisations in association with millions of Muslims. It is an essential part of the Tablighi Jamaat around the world as it plays a significant role on the lives of Muslims, and a huge number of people engage in Ijtema. Many countries celebrate this event in a similar way. According to Bulbul Siddiqi, participation in Ijtema increases religious authority, status and empowerment, and contributes on the Muslim identity through the idea of brotherhood and ummah.

== Introduction ==
Ijtema is the annual three-day congregation of Tablighi Jamaat (TJ). It has a strong appeal to South Asian Muslims and its diaspora. The immediate concern of TJ is the moral reform of individuals and purification of the self, often described as ‘making Muslims true Muslims’: they say Muslims should go back to the basic principles of their faith to follow strictly the commandments of Islam in their personal lives and in their dealings with others. On the other side, this is a faith renewal movement. TJ gets the attention of the wider world through its annual three-day congregational gathering that is Ijtema, with millions of people. Ijtema has become a symbol of the TJ movement.

Ijtema is popular among the TJ activists and to the larger number of people who do not actively engage with it. However, hajj is a farz, compulsory for a financially solvent Muslim. Because of a large number of participating people, ijtema in countries like India, Bangladesh, Pakistan become a desirable pilgrimage event for the global Tablighi Jamaat activists. However, no evidence of anthropological research can be found on ijtema in Bangladesh. This is one of the main reasons to choose Bangladesh as the case of study. The European Journal of Economic and Political Studies shows that participation in Ijtema increases religious authority and status, which acts as the means of religious empowerment in society.

== Bangladesh research ==
Ethnographic method has been used in this research to provide an in-depth understanding of the current notion of Ijtema in Bangladesh. Participant observation, which is the main tool of ethnographic approach, provided a deep insight into the movement and challenged some of the more homogeneous accounts of Islamisation portrayed in Bangladesh. This study adopted multi-sited ethnographic method to explore TJ movement. Here, it would not be possible to understand this movement conducting traditional single site fieldwork, because the basic principle of Tablighi Jamaat is to move in various places, so I had to move with them in different sites and location to get the holistic perspectives of the movement. The total length of the fieldwork was ten months in Bangladesh with an interval of five months. Apart from this day-to-day participant observation I used case studies, in-depth interviews, focus group discussions (FGDs), and informal discussion to gain a holistic perspectives of the movement. In-depth interviews has conducted among selected TJ followers both male and female, religious leaders, leaders of other leading Islamic movements, people from the different social class and TJ organisers at local, national and transnational level.

== History ==
=== Early history ===
The tradition of Ijtema was initiated Muhammad Ilyas al-Kandhlawi, an Indian savant, and began as a small group of religious-minded individuals gathering at a local mosque. For 41 years Tongi has been the chosen location, although similar programs are held on a lesser scale in other countries. These days India has also been considered a very popular place for organising such congregations. The Ijtema is non-political, and therefore it draws people of all persuasion. Prayer is held for the spiritual adulation, exaltation and welfare of the Muslims community. This immensely popular program gives the people of the different countries an opportunity to interact with Muslims from other countries and is commonly attended by prominent political figures.

Around 1927, TJ entered in the Bengal region. The first Bengal provincial Tablighi committee formed under the secretaryship of Moulvi Abul Hayat with Moulvi Aftabuddin, who was sub- editor of The Light (De, 1998). However, this movement found its inroad into East Pakistan (now Bangladesh) just after the partition of Indian subcontinent in 1947 (Sikand, 2002). During this period, three Ijtema centres developed in three parts of the subcontinent; they are Bhopal in India, Raiwind in Pakistan and Dhaka in East Pakistan (now Bangladesh). TJ was able to recruit people from various backgrounds during this time. In this early stage of TJ in East Pakistan, many people in the professional class and students were involved with TJ.

Moulana Abul Hasan Ali Nadvi mentioned in a biography of Moulana Ilyas that, in the 1930s, they used to have the annual ijtema at Mewat and they had a fixed place for ijtema. Moulana Ilyas used to take part in these ijtemas regularly. The biggest ijtema was held at Nuh of the district of Gourgano from 28 to 30 November 1941 (Nadvi, 2006:118). That was the notable Ijtema in terms of participating number of devotees. According to Nadvi (2006), there were about 20-25 thousand people in that ijtema. This ijtema was successful in many ways; one of them are to be able to send many jamaats to the various places in India such as Khorza, Aligarh, Agra, Buland city, Mirath, Panipath, Sonipath etc. In April 1943, they had sent a jamaat in Karachi (a major city of Pakistan). The first Ijtema held in East Pakistan (now Bangladesh) was in 1954 in Dhaka, the capital of Bangladesh. Later that year they had organised another massive ijtema in Khulna, a south-west district of Bangladesh. Since then they have been organising ijtema every year in a regular basis. During this time, the centre of TJ in Bangladesh was based on the Lalbagh Shahi Mosque. Due to limitation of space, they had to move to the current location at Kakrail. Background of TJ in Bangladesh, In 1954 there were about 15-20 thousands participants took part in the first ijtema. However, by 1965 even Kakrail had become too small for the ijtema. Therefore, they had to think about a new place for the ijtema. In the same year, they had to shift the venue at Tongi near Dhaka. Since then, TJ has been regularly organising ijtema at Tongi.
