= Nazar-ur-Rehman =

Pakistani Islamic preacher (1929–2026)

Maulana Haji Nazar-ur-Rehman مولانا حاجی نذر الرحمن

4th Amir of Tablighi Jamaat in Pakistan
- In office 16 November 2012 – 16 November 2026
- Preceded by: Muhammad Abdul Wahhab
- Succeeded by: Maulana Ahmed Batla

Personal life
- Born: 31 August 1929 Rawalpindi, Punjab Province, British India
- Died: 16 November 2026 (aged 97)
- Main interest: Dawah
- Occupation: Islamic preacher

Religious life
- Religion: Islam
- Denomination: Sunni
- Jurisprudence: Hanafi
- Movement: Tablighi and Deobandi

Maulana Nazar-ur-Rehman (Urdu: مولانا نذر الرحمن; 31 August 1929 – 16 November 2026) was a Pakistani Islamic preacher who served as the Amir (Head) of Tablighi Jamaat.

Nazar-ur-Rehman was consistently ranked among the top 50 from the 2020 edition through the 2027 edition of The 500 Most Influential Muslims.

== Early life and education ==
Maulana Nazar-ur-Rehman was born in 1929 in the village of Bilawal, Rawalpindi district, Punjab. His father, Hafiz Ghulam Mohiuddin, was a devout follower of Pir Meher Ali Shah, regularly journeying to Golra Sharif on foot. Maulana Nazar-ur-Rehman and his brothers Haji Hafiz Fazl Hussain and Hafiz Muhammad Siddique were known locally as the "Bamsami" brothers.

According to Hamad Nazir Ranjha's History and Tazikra of Khanqah Sirajiya Naqshbandiyya Mujadiya, Maulana Nazar-ur-Rehman received his early education from Maulana Abdul Khaliq in Mauza Bhatral, Rawalpindi district, and subsequently from Mufti Abdul Hai Qureshi and Darul Uloom Rabbaniyya in Bhuigad. He pursued higher Islamic studies with Maulana Fariduddin Qureshi and completed his Daora Hadith (Hadith and Tafseer studies) from Sheikh Al-Hadith Maulana Sultan Mahmood, a disciple of Sheikh Al-Hind Maulana Mahmood Hasan Deobandi, at Madrasah Khadim Uloom Nabubuat, Kathiala Sheikhan, Gujarat, in 1949-1950.

After completing his studies, he returned to Bilawal village from 1950 to 1955, assuming the position of Imam at the local mosque, succeeding his elder brother Haji Hafiz Fazl Hussain, who then led prayers in Jatli village mosque near Gujar Khan.

== Joining the Tablighi Mission ==
On 14 February 1997, After spending four years in Bilawal, he moved to Buigarh and then served at mosques in Taxila and DM Textile Mills in Dhok Hasu, Rawalpindi. Subsequently, he devoted ten years to preaching at Zakaria Masjid, Rawalpindi. Eventually, Maulana Nazar-ur-Rehman assumed significant responsibilities at the World Tablighi Mission Center in Raiwind, Lahore, becoming one of Pakistan's initial twenty members of the Tablighi Jamaat and serving alongside Haji Abdul Wahab. In his will dated 17 November 2015, Haji Abdul Wahab specified Maulana Nazar-ur-Rehman as a preferred successor and requested him to lead his funeral prayers. Following Haji Abdul Wahab's death on 20 November 2018, Maulana Nazar-ur-Rehman assumed leadership of the Pakistani Tablighi Jamaat.

== Death ==
Nazar-ur-Rehman died on 16 November 2026, at the age of 97.
