= Kakrail Mosque =

Mosque in Dhaka, Bangladesh

Kakrail Mosque (Malwali Mosque)
- কাকরাইল মারকাজ (মালওয়ালী মসজিদ)
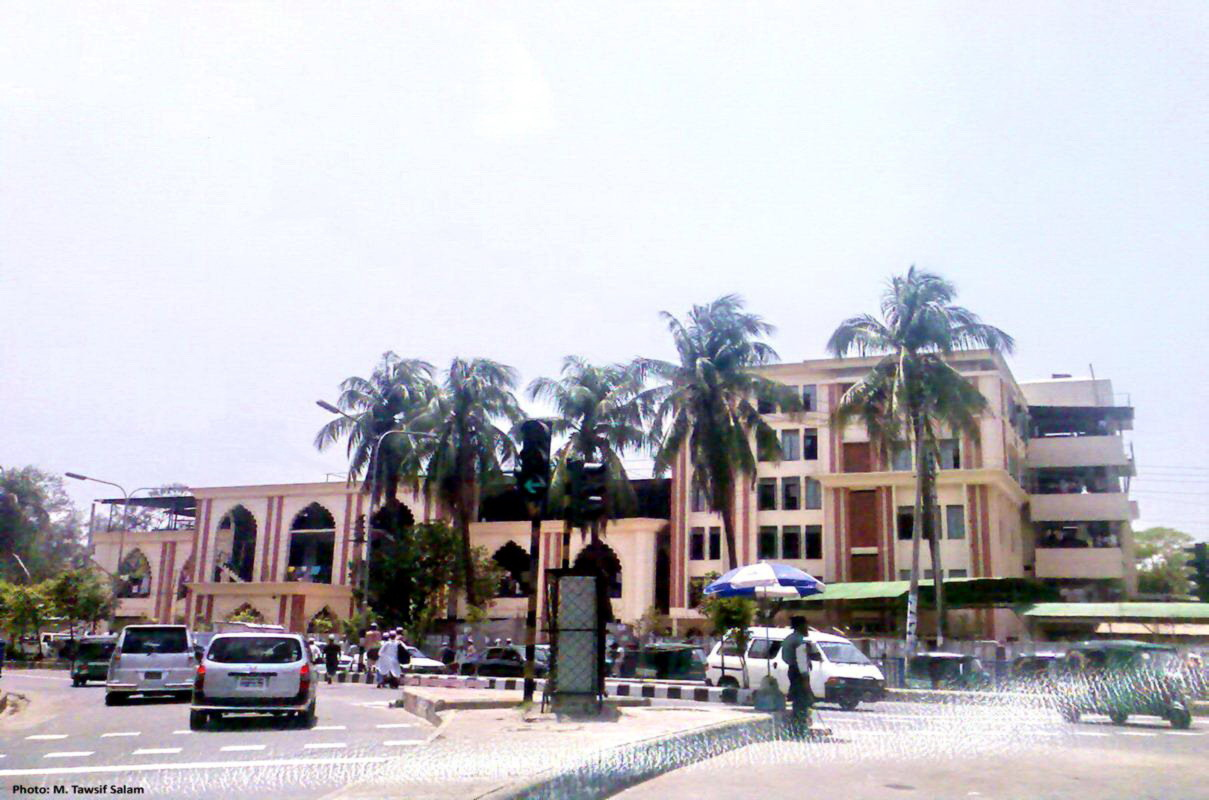

- Location of the mosque in Dhaka

Religion
- Affiliation: Sunni Islam
- Sect: Tablighi Jamaat (Deobandi movement)
- Ecclesiastical or organizational status: Mosque
- Status: Active

Location
- Location: Kakrail, Ramna, Dhaka South City Corporation, Dhaka
- Country: Bangladesh
- Interactive map of Kakrail Mosque (Malwali Mosque)
- Coordinates: 23°44′13″N 90°24′13″E

Architecture
- Architect: Haji Abdul Mukit Saheb RH.
- Type: Mosque architecture
- Founder: 2nd Hazratji Maulana Mohammad Yousuf Shaheb Kandhlawi (RH.); 2nd Aamir of World Tablighi Jamat

The Kakrail Mosque, also known as the Malwali Mosque (Bengali: মালওয়ালী মসজিদ) or as the Kakrail Markaz (Bengali: কাকরাইল মারকাজ), is a Tabligh Jamat mosque in the Kakrail neighbourhood of Ramna, Dhaka, Bangladesh. Located near Ramna Park, it is the centre of the Tabligh Jamat in Bangladesh.

== Leadership ==
The mosque is being managed by two disputed groups of Tablighi Jaamat. Followers of Aalami Sura

== History ==
There is disagreement as to when and by whom the mosque was first built. However, it is seemingly the case that a previous mosque existed in the premises prior to Tablighi administration. Some claim that the original mosque was made of tin and built by the gardeners (known as Malis) of nearby Ramna Park. It was known as Malwali Masjid (Bengali: মালওয়ালি মসজিদ). It is known from the senior attendants that a mosque was established here by a member of the Nawab family of Dhaka about 300 years ago, along with other installations by the family. In the beginning, the mosque was quite small and had a small pond in front.

In 1952, the Tablighi Jamaat movement in Bangladesh relocated their headquarters from Khan Mohammad Mridha Mosque, and declared the Kakrail Mosque as its Markaz (centre). The three-storey mosque was rebuilt under the supervision of Haji Abdul Muqit, an architect belonging to the Tablighi Jamaat.

Maulana Zubair Ahmed was an imam of this mosque in 2020.

== Architecture ==
The present mosque was designed by engineer Haji Abdul Muqit. Adjacent to the roof of the mosque are triangular carvings. The pillars of the mosque are square in shape. The west wall of the mosque is rippling. The mosque also has wide verandas on three sides. On the south and north sides there are two pond-like houses for Wudu rituals and can serve hundreds of people at once. There are also more modern arrangements for performing Wudu outside of the mosque building. A short distance north of the mosque is a two-storey building for toilets and bathrooms. There are no entrance doors and so it is open day and night.

== See also ==
- Islam in Bangladesh
- List of mosques in Bangladesh
