= Tablighi Jamaat =

International Islamic movement

Total population
- 12 to 80 million

Founder
- Muhammad Ilyas Kandhlawi

Religions
- Islam (Deobandism)

Scriptures
- Quran, and Hadith, Fada'il series, Hayat al-Sahaba

Tablighi Jamaat (Urdu: تبلیغی جماعت, lit. 'Society of Preachers', also translated as "propagation party" or "preaching party") is an international Islamic religious movement. It focuses on exhorting Muslims to be more religiously observant and encourages fellow members to return to practise their religion according to the teachings of the Islamic prophet Muhammad, and secondarily give dawah (calling) to non-Muslims. "One of the most widespread Sunni" islah (reform) and called "one of the most influential religious movements in 20th-century Islam," the organisation is estimated to have between 12 and 80 million adherents worldwide, spread over 150 countries, with the majority living in South Asia.

The group encourages its followers to undertake short-term preaching tours, known as khuruj, lasting from a few days to a few months. During these tours, members remind one another of the core teachings of Prophet Muhammad and encourage attendance at mosque prayers and sermons. Members travel, eat, and pray together. Established in 1926 by Muhammad Ilyas Kandhlawi, in the Mewat region of British India, it has roots in the revivalist tradition of the Deobandi school, and developed as a response to the deterioration of moral values and the neglect of aspects of Islam. The movement aims for the spiritual reformation of Islam by working at the grassroots level. The teachings of Tabligh Jamaat are expressed in "Six Principles": Kalimah (Declaration of faith), Salah (Prayer), Ilm-o-Zikr (Reading and Remembrance), Ikraam-e-Muslim (Respect for Muslims), Ikhlas-e-Niyyat (Sincerity of intention), and Dawat-o-Tableegh (Proselytisation).

Tablighi Jamaat denies any political affiliation, involvement in debate over political or Islamic doctrine such as fiqh. It maintains its focus on the study of the sacred scriptures of Islam: the Quran and the Hadith, as well as the lifetimes of those who accompanied the prophet, and that personal spiritual renewal that results will lead to reformation of society.

== History ==
The emergence of Tablighi Jamaat also coincided closely with the rise of various Hindu revivalist movements such as Shuddhi (purification) and Sanghatan (consolidation) launched in the early twentieth century to reconvert Hindus who had converted to Islam and Tablighi Jamaat has been called a "missionary offshoot" of the revivalist Deobandi movement of India.

=== Origin ===
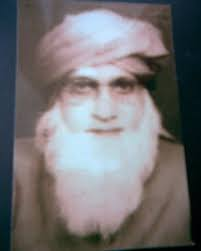
Muhammad Ilyas Kandhlawi

Muhammad Ilyas Kandhlawi, the founder of Tablighi Jamaat, wanted to create a movement that would enjoin good and forbid evil as the Quran decreed, as his teacher Rasheed Ahmad Gangohi dreamed of doing. The inspiration for this came to Ilyas in a dream during his second pilgrimage to Mecca in 1926.

Ilyas abandoned his teaching post at Madrasah Mazahir Uloom in Saharanpur and became a missionary for reforming Muslims (but he did not advocate preaching to non-Muslims). He relocated near Dargah Hazrat Nizamuddin in Delhi, where this movement was formally launched in 1926, or 1927. When setting the guidelines for the movement, he sought inspiration from the practices adopted by Muhammad at the dawn of Islam. Muhammad Ilyas put forward the slogan, Urdu: "!اﮮ مسلمانو! مسلمان بنو", "O Muslims, become [true] Muslims!". This expressed the central focus of Tablighi Jamaat: their aim to renew Muslims by socially by trying to unite them in embracing the lifestyle of Muhammad. The movement gained a following in a relatively short period and nearly 25,000 people attended the annual conference in November 1941.

At the time, some Muslim Indian leaders feared that Muslims were losing their religious identity and were heedless of Islamic rituals. The movement was never given any name officially, but Ilyas called it Tahrik-i Imaan. Muhammad Ilyas died in 1945 and he himself is buried in the Nizām Ad-Dīn Mosque.

The Mewat region where Tablighi Jamaat started near Delhi was inhabited by the Meos, an ethnic group native to the region, most of whom had converted to Islam, and then had adopted Hindu traditions and attitudes when Muslim political power declined in the region, lacking the necessary acumen (according to one author, Roger Ballard) required to resist the cultural and religious influence of majority Hindus, prior to the arrival of Tablighi Jamaat.

=== Expansion ===
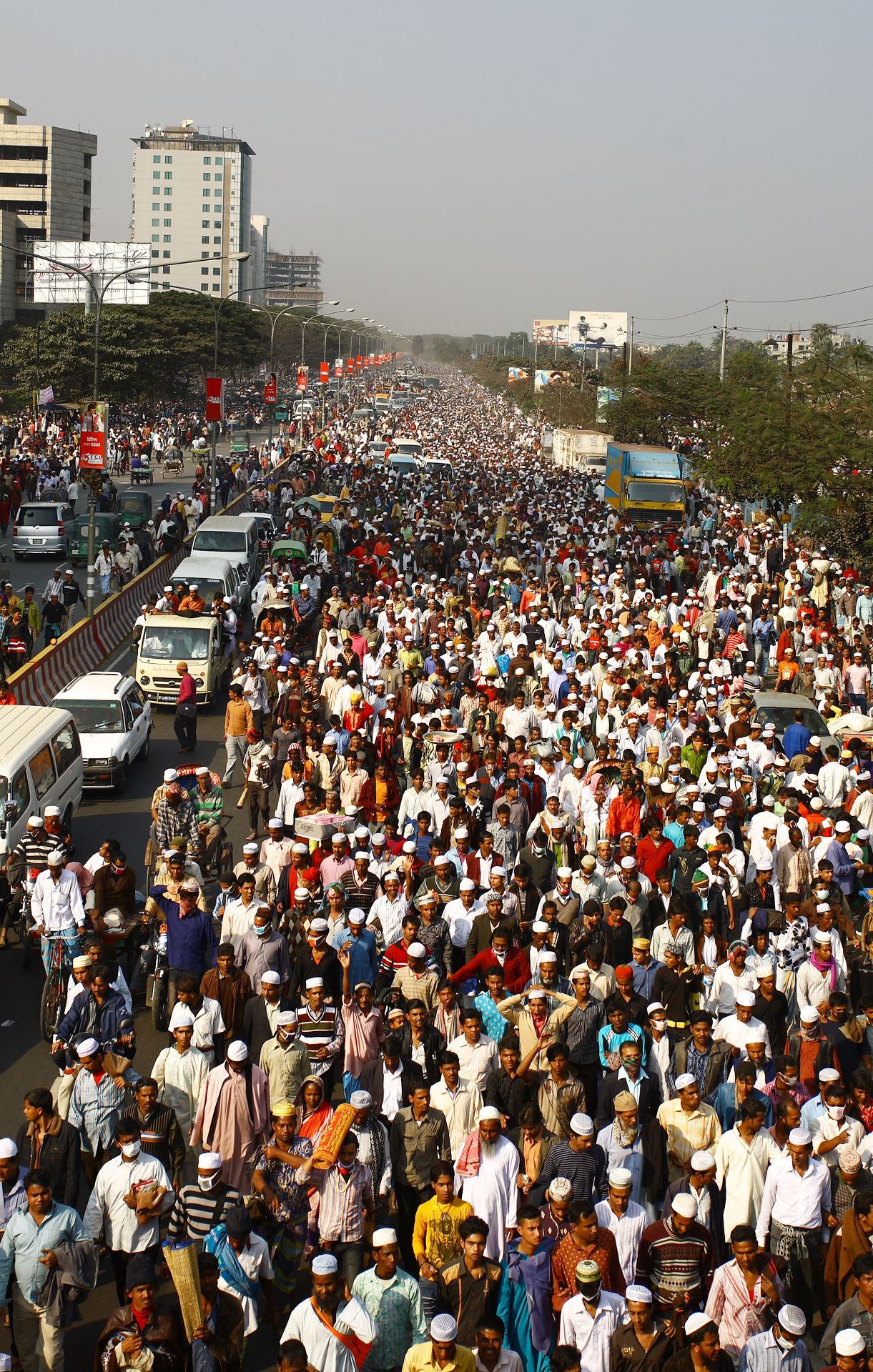
Bishwa Ijtema in Bangladesh

The group began to expand its activities in 1946. The initial expansion within South Asia happened immediately after the partition of India in 1947, when the Pakistan Chapter was established in the hinterlands of Raiwind town near Lahore, Pakistan. The Pakistan Chapter remained the largest until Bangladesh became independent from Pakistan in 1971. Today, the largest Chapter is Bangladesh followed by the second largest in Pakistan. Within two decades of its establishment, the group reached Southwest and Southeast Asia, Africa, Europe, and North America. The Tablighi Jamaat's aversion to politics, and also its lack of any direct and practical economic-political-social viewpoints, helped it enter and operate in societies, especially western countries and societies where politically active religious groups faced restrictions.

=== Foreign missions ===
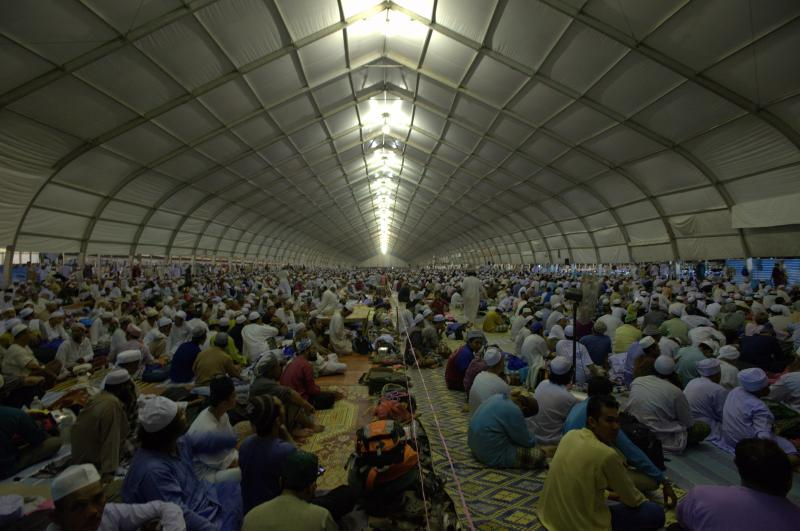
2009 Annual Congregation of Tablighi Jamaat in Sepang District, Selangor, Malaysia

The first foreign missions were sent to the Hejaz (western Saudi Arabia) and Britain in 1946. The United States followed and during the 1970s and 1980s the Tablighi Jamaat also established a large presence in continental Europe. In France it was introduced in the 1960s, and grew significantly in the two decades following 1970.

In France, as of 2004, it was represented on the French Council of the Muslim Faith. During the first half-decade of the 21st century Tablighi Jamaat went through a major revival in France, reaching 100,000 followers by 2006. However, the United Kingdom is the current focus of the movement in Europe, primarily due to the large South Asian population that began to arrive there in the 1960s. By 2007, Tablighi Jamaat members were situated at 600 of Britain's 1,350 mosques.

After the collapse of the Soviet Union in 1991, the movement made inroads into Central Asia. As of 2007, it was estimated that 10,000 Tablighi Jamaat members could be found in Kyrgyzstan.

Pew Research Center estimates there are between 12 and 80 million adherents, spread across more than 150 countries. The majority of the followers of the Tablighi Jamaat live in South Asia. It is estimated that nearly 50,000 members of Tablighi Jamaat are active in the United States.

== Beliefs and objectives ==
Members of Tabligh Jamat are allowed to follow their own fiqh as long as it does not deviate from Sunni Islam. Tablighi Jamaat defines its objective with reference to the concept of Dawah, the proselytising or preaching of Islam. Tablighi Jamaat interprets Dawah as enjoining good and forbidding evil only and defines its objective within the framework of two particular Qur'anic verses which refer to this mission. Those two verses are:

And whose words are better than someone who calls ˹others˺ to Allah, does good, and says, "I am truly one of those who submit."?

— Surah Fussilat 41:33

Let there be a group among you who call ˹others˺ to goodness, encourage what is good, and forbid what is evil—it is they who will be successful.

— Surah Al Imran 3:104

=== Six Attributes (Sifāt) ===
Six Principles of Tabligh Jamaat

When Tablighi Jamaat visits a village or neighborhood, it invites the local Muslims to assemble in the mosque to hear their message in the form of "Six Attributes". These six Attributes were derived from the lives of the companions of Muhammad, since Muslims believe Sahabah (companions) are the best human beings after Muhammad—It is stated in one hadith, "My Sahabah (companions) are like [guiding] stars, whosoever follows [any] one of them will be guided." The Six Sifāt are basically a discussion about six special Attributes that when achieved, will just make it easy to follow the entire Dīn. These objectives are:

1. Kalimah (ʾImān'i Sifāt) — T.J Believes, to achieve it, One must have to strive. To make his iman into Yaqeen. That, Creation cannot do anything without the will of Allah, but Allah can & Peace-Happiness, Success is lying only in the way that Muhammad shows, not in any other worldly ways.
2. Salah (Namaz) — T.J Believes, One must have to try to achieve the sahaba standard salah. in both the inward and outward manners, that the Companions learnt from Muhammad. Have to make a Yaqeen that, by doing so one can become direct recipients from the vast Treasuries of Allah.
3. Ilm with Zikr (Knowledge and Remembrance of Allah) — T.J Believes, One must have to try to know what Allah desires from us at any particular time and condition. know to differentiate halal-Haram. so that he can act accordingly in the way Muhammad taught. Try to achieve, the consciousness and remembrance of Allah in every action, at each moment in one's worldly existence. these two are combined because only through the quality of Zikr, A'mal can be done with the full consciousness and remembrance of Allah. T.J Believes, the benefits of ilm should be learned in Taleem programs & ilm Maslaha from Ulama. The knowledge and remembrance of Allah conducted individually and in sessions where the congregation listens to preaching by the emir, performs prayers, recites the Quran and reads Hadith. The congregation will also use these sessions to eat meals together, thus fostering a sense of community and identity.
4. Ikram al-Muslim (Honoring Muslims; Ikram Sifāt) — Treating fellow Muslims "with honor and deference". T.J Believes, One must have to try to act Iḥsān (in the best possible way, with excellence and perfection), toward every Creation. One should invariably fulfil the obligations towards other human beings as commanded by Allah, & as taught by Muhammad. One should be prepared to sacrifice one's own rights, for which one will be rewarded in the hereafter. The other aspect of this sifat is, Akhlaq and Haqooq Ul Ibad encompassing rights of the Muslims as well as mankind. It is through these moral values, character building and showing sympathy to Muslims and non Muslims like poor, sick, elderly and other needy Islamic teachings could be practically disseminated.
5. Ikhlas-i-Niyyah (Purity, Sincerity of Intention; Ikhlāṣ Sifāt) — T.J Believes, One must have to try to be pure, sincere when making an intention. every action is to be undertaken with no other end in view but to please Allah, & to reform oneself. Any slightest deviation from this set path is bound to generate the wrath, anger of Allah instead as it tantamont to admitting partner in that deed. Whether it be ibadat or mu'amalat, Allah accepts only such deeds which are offered purely with an intention to gain his pleasure only. A small act with purity in intention is great, considered acceptable and fully reward-able by Allah, compared to a big one where a slightest corruption in intention is present.
6. Dawah and Tabligh (Invitation and Conveyance, Preach; Dāʿī Sifāt), also Tafrigh-i-Waqt (sparing time in the path of Allah; Missionary tours;) — T.J Believes, As there are no more prophets to come, the responsibility for the effort of Da'wah now falls upon the Ummah. So, One should spent his life, wealth & time in the way of Allah. so that he can learn the proper use of these three, which was actually borrowed from Allah. Should follow the footsteps of Muhammad, by taking His message door to door. He should make an effort so that everyone can gets closer to Allah, & also withdraw himself from worldly engagements to go forth in missionary groups. spend one night a week, one weekend a month, 40 continuous days a year, and ultimately 120 days at least once in their lives. Women would work among other women or travel occasionally, with their men folk on longer tours. Only in an atmosphere free of worldly thoughts can be there a true receptivity to the message concerned.

== Activities, traditions, methodology ==
Dry-dock parable:
Man is a ship in trouble in tumultuous sea. It is impossible to repair it without taking it away from the high seas where the waves of ignorance and the temptations of temporal life assail it. Its only chance is to come back to land to be dry-docked. The dry-dock is the mosque of the jamaat.

— from the book Travellers in Faith

The activism of Tablighi Jamaat can be characterised by the last of the Six Principles. This principle, Tafrigh-i-Waqt (English: sparing of time) justifies the withdrawal from World, though temporarily, for travelling. Travel has been adopted as the most effective method of personal reform and has become an emblematic feature of organisation. They describe the purpose of this retreat as to patch the damages caused by the worldly indulgence and occasionally use the dry-dock parable to explain this.

These individual jamaats, each led by an ameer, are sent from each markaz across the city or country to remind people to persist on the path of God. The duration of the work depends on the discretion of each jamaat. A trip can take an evening, a couple of days or a prolonged duration.

=== Khurūj (proselytising tour) ===
Preaching tours hold an important position in the Tablighi Da'wah methodology that they may be referred as 'travelers in faith' Tabligh Jamaat encourages its followers to follow the pattern of spending "one night a week, one weekend a month, 40 continuous days a year, and ultimately 120 days at least once in their lives engaged in tabligh missions". During the course of these tours, members are generally seen dressed in simple, white, loose-clothing, carrying sleeping bags on their backs. These members use mosques as their base during this travel but particular mosques, due to more frequent tablighiyat activities, have come to be specifically associated with this organisation. These mosques generally hold the periodic, smaller scale convocations for neighbourhood members.

During their stay in mosques, these jamaats conduct a daily gasht, which involves visiting local neighbourhoods, preferably with the help of a guide called as rehbar. They invite people to attend the Maghrib prayer at their mosque and those who attend are delivered a sermon after the prayers, which essentially outlines the Six Principles. They urge the attendees to spend time in tabligh for self reformation and the propagation of Islam.

Generally, the assumed role of these jamaat members cycle in a way that they may be engaged as a preacher, a cook or as a cleaner at other times. Among Tabligh Jamaat members, this is generally referred to as khidmat which essentially connotes to serving their companions and freeing them for tablighi engagements. The members of the Jamaat are assigned these roles based on the day's mashwara. The markaz keeps records of each jamaat and its members, the identity of whom is verified from their respective mosques. Mosques are used to assist the tablighi activities of individual jamaats that voluntarily undertake preaching missions. Members of a jamaat, ideally, pay expenses themselves so as to avoid financial dependence on anyone.

=== Ijtema (annual gathering) ===
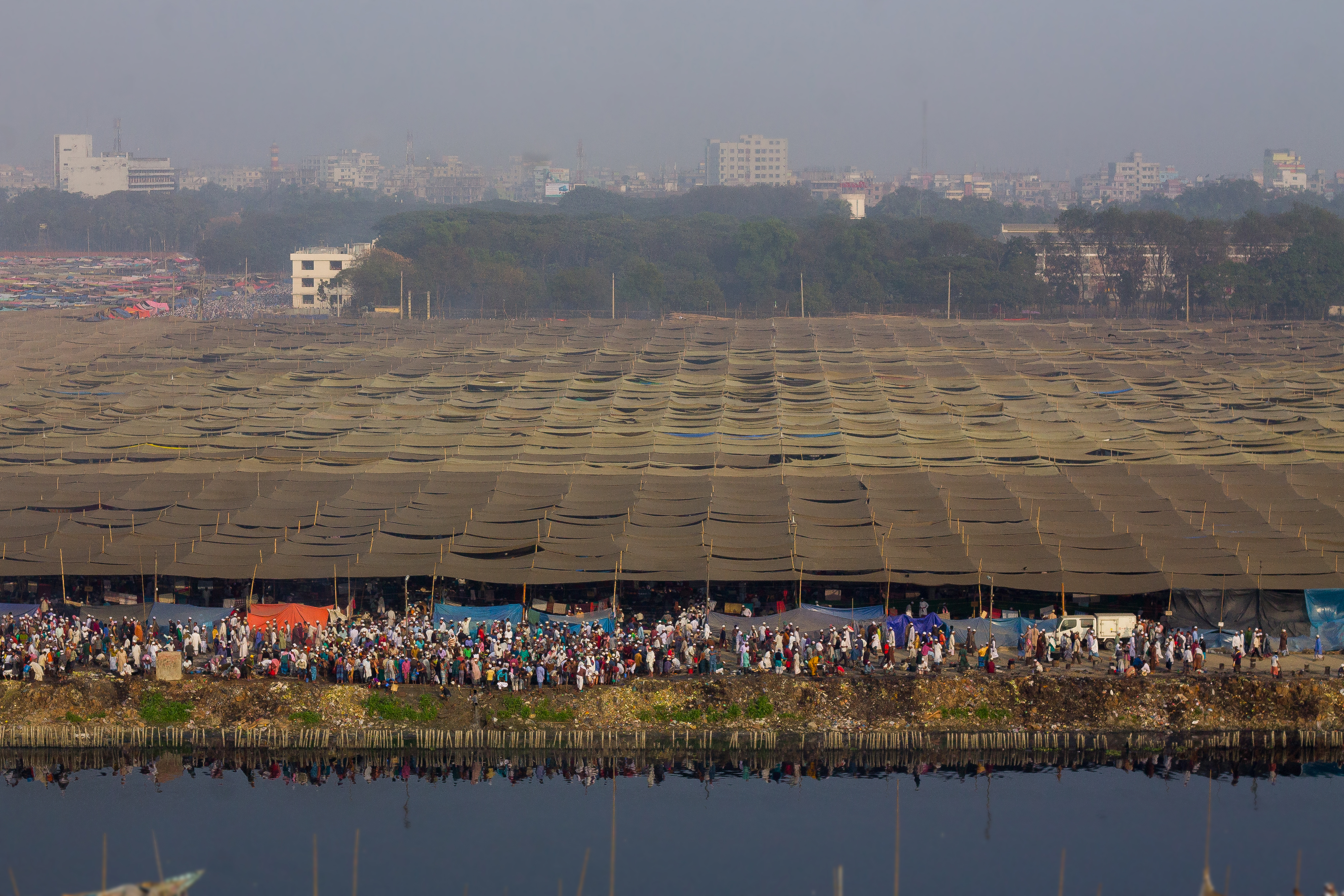
Bishwa Ijtema (World Gathering) of Muslims at Tongi, Bangladesh

An annual gathering of followers, called ijtema, is summoned at headquarters of the respective countries. A typical ijtema continues for three days and ends with an exceptionally long prayer. These gatherings are considered moments of intense blessings by Tabligh Jamaat members and are known to attract members in excess of 2 million in some countries. The oldest ijtema of the World started in Bhopal, capital city of Madhya Pradesh, India. It attracts people from all over the world. Almost 2 million people gather for this annual gathering. One of the largest of such annual gatherings is held in Bangladesh. The Bengali gathering, called Bishwa Ijtema (World Gathering), converges followers from around the world in Tongi near Dhaka, Bangladesh, with an attendance exceeding 2 million people. The second largest Tabligh Jamaat gathering takes place in Raiwind, Pakistan which was attended by approximately 1.5 million people in 2004. In 2011 Pakistan divided the Ijtema into two parts and a total of 1 million people attended each of the two Ijtema.

=== Methodology ===
The method adopted by Muhammad Ilyas was to organise units (called jamaats, Arabic: جماعاتِ meaning Assembly) of at least ten persons and send them to various villages or neighborhoods to preach. These outings, Dawah tours (see below), are now organised by Tablighi Jamaat leaders. In these tours, emphasis is laid on "A hadith about virtues of action" (imitating Muhammad). In the ahadith (reported sayings of Muhammad) of fazail (virtues) these has been called Eemaan (faith) and Ihtisab (for the sake of Allah) and Tablighi Jamaat believes this is the most vital deriving force for reward in akhirah (afterlife). The Tablighi Jamaat founder Ilyas preached that knowledge of virtues and A'amalu-Saliha (Good Deeds and Actions) takes precedence over the knowledge of Masa'il (jurisprudence). Knowing jurisprudence detail (Fara'id (mandates) and Sunan (traditions) of Salat) is useful only if a person is ready to perform rituals such as offering Salat. They insist that the best way of learning is teaching and encouraging others, with the books prescribed by Tabligi Jamaat Movement in the light of Quran and Hadith stories of Prophets, Sahaba (Companions of Prophet) and Awlia Allah ("Friends of Allah"). (Note: In this background Tablighi Jamaat suggest a series of books comprising Riyadus Saliheen, Muntakhab Ahadith (Collection of authentic Ahadith without commentary), Hayatus Sahaba and Fadhaa'il A'maal Vol 1 & 2 and other books.' etc.) A collection of books, usually referred as Tablighi Nisaab (Tablighi Curriculum), is recommended by Tabligh Jamaat elders for general reading. This set includes four books namely (Hayatus Sahabah, Fazail-e-Amaal, Fazail-e-Sadqaat and Muntakhab Ahadith).

In its early days and in South Asia, the Tabligh movement aimed to return to orthodoxy and "purify" the Muslim religio-cultural identity of heterodox or "borderline" Muslims who still practised customs and religious rites connected with Hinduism. Especially to counteract the efforts of Hindu proselytising movements who targeted these often recently converts from Hinduism. Unlike common proselytising movements, Tablighi Jamaat has mostly focused on making Muslims 'better and purer' and ideally "religiously perfect", rather than preaching to the non-Muslims. This is because (it believes) dawah to non-Muslims will only be effective (or will be much more effective) when a Muslim reaches "perfection".

== Organisation ==
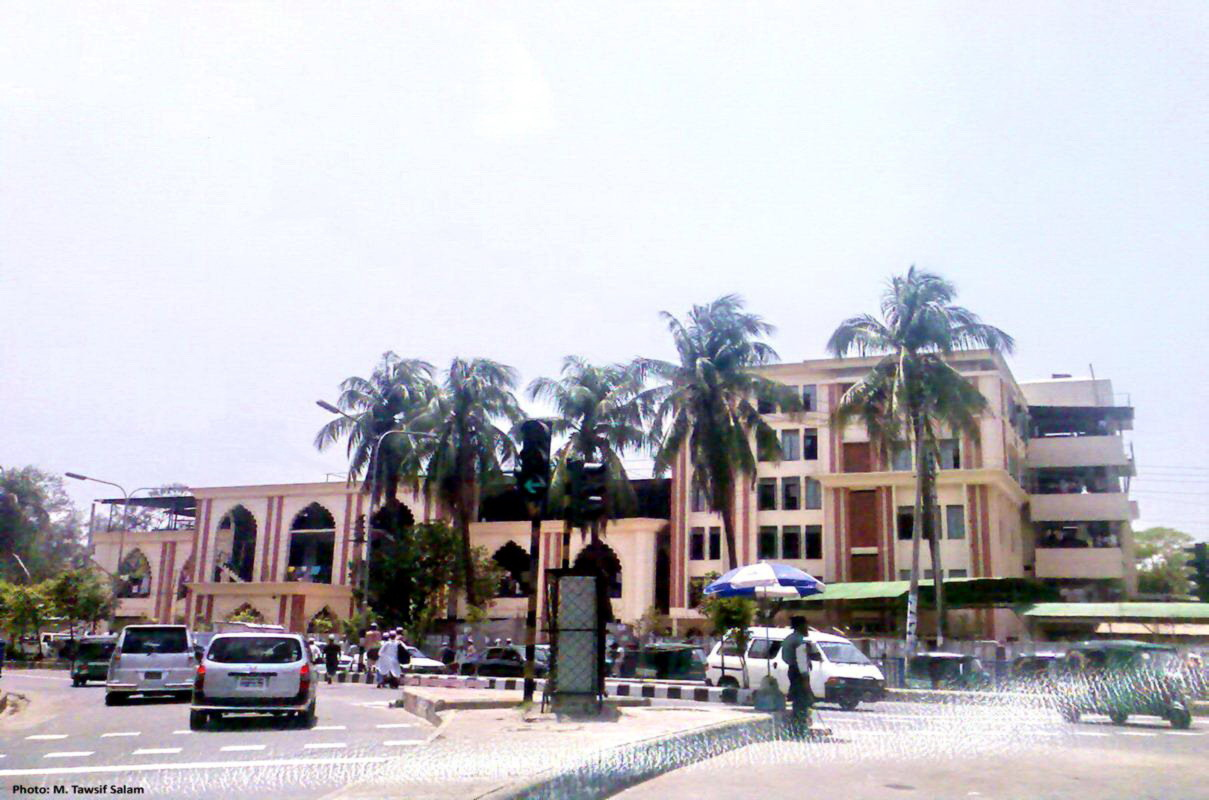
Kakrail Mosque, Dhaka. The Tablighi Jamaat movement in Bangladesh is mostly based here.

Tablighi Jamaat follows an informal organisational structure and keeps an introverted institutional profile. It has been described as "a free-floating religious movement with minimal dependence on hierarchy, leadership positions, and decision-making procedures." It keeps its distance from the mass media and avoids publishing details about its activities and membership. The group also exercises complete abstinence from expressing opinions on political and controversial issues, mainly to avoid the disputes that would accompany these endorsements. As an organisation, Tabligh Jamaat does not seek donations and is not funded by anyone; in fact, members have to bear their own expenditures. Since there is no formal registration process and no official membership count has ever been taken, the exact membership statistics remain unknown. The movement discourages interviews with its elders and has never officially released texts, although there are publications associated with the movement (usually referred to as Tablighi Nisaab [Tablighi Curriculum]). The emphasis has never been on book learning but rather on first-hand personal communication.

The organisation's activities are coordinated through centers called Markaz. It also has country-wise centers in over 200 countries to coordinate its activities. These centers organise volunteer, self-funding people in groups (called jamaats), averaging ten to twelve people, to remind Muslims to remain steadfast on the path of Allah. These jamaats and preaching missions are self-funded by their respective members.

Ameer is the title of supervisor (doyen) in the Tabligh Jamaat, and the attribute largely sought is the quality of faith rather than the worldly rank. The ameer of Tabligh Jamaat is appointed for life by a central consultative council (shura) and elders of the Tabligh Jamaat. The first emir was Muhammad Ilyas Kandhalawi, later succeeded by his son Maulana Muhammad Yusuf Kandhalawi and then by Inamul Hasan Kandhlawi. After Inamul Hasan's death in 1995, the movement's affairs were run through the shura system he had set up. Whether Muhammad Saad Kandhlawi is the current emir is disputed: his supporters regard him as emir, while the Aalami Shura holds that the movement should be led collectively by a shura without a single emir. Sometime in 1992, 3 years before the time of his demise, Inamul Hasan Kandhlawi formed a 10-member advisory committee to appoint an emir (ameer). This 10-member advisory committee consisted of Saeed Ahmed Khan, Mufti Zainul Abideen, Muhammad Umar Palanpuri, Izhar-ul-Hasan Kandhlawi, Zubair-ul-Hassan Kandhlawi, Miyaji Mehraab, Haji Abdul Wahhab, Haji Abdul Muqeet, Haji Afzal, Muhammad Saad Kandhlawi, and Khalid Siddiqui Aligarhi.

Since 2016, Tableeghi Jamat has functioned as two groups after a bitter division, one led by Maulana Saad Kandhelvi with headquarters in India, and the other led by a collective Shura with headquarters in Punjab, Pakistan and Bangladesh. There have been at least three violent clashes, one in Delhi, India and two in Bangladesh.

The division followed a meeting at Raiwind on 16 November 2015, at which senior members reconstituted the world shura with 13 members and resolved that the movement would continue under the shura system without a particular emir. Saad Kandhlawi did not accept these resolutions, refused to sign them, and reportedly declared himself emir. His supporters maintain that his leadership had been settled years earlier and describe the dispute as one between Nizamuddin and "rebels". In December 2016, Darul Uloom Deoband issued a fatwa stating that Saad had strayed from the path of the majority of scholars in some of his interpretations, and in August 2017 it barred Tablighi activities on its campus until the two sides resolved their differences. The two groups are commonly called the Nizamuddin group, which follows Saad Kandhlawi, and the Aalami Shura (world council) group, associated with Haji Abdul Wahab and based at Raiwind Markaz. Mediation attempts in several countries have not resolved the split.

== Emirs of Tablighi Jamaat in India ==
- Muhammad Ilyas Kandhalawi (1920 - 1944)
- Maulana Muhammad Yusuf Kandhalawi (1944 - 1965)
- Inamul Hasan Kandhlawi (1965 - 1995)
- Zubairul Hasan Kandhlavi (Co-Emir: 1995 - 2014)
- Saad Kandhlavi (Co-Emir: 1995 - 2014; Emir: 2014 - present)

== Emirs of Tablighi Jamaat Pakistan ==
- Haji Muhammad Shafi Qureshi (1947 - 1965)
- Haji Muhammad Bashir (1965 - 1992)
- Haji Abdul Wahab (1992 - 2018)
- Maulana Nazar-ur-Rehman (2018-2026)
- Maulana Ahmad Batla (2026-present)

== Role of women ==
In Tablighi Jamaat, women are encouraged to stay at home, and to choose a life of "segregation between female and male". However they also engage in proselytising activities, discussing among themselves in small groups the basics of Tabligh and traveling with their husbands (or another mahram) on proselytising trips. Tabligh inculcates in them that dawah is also important alongside taking care of their spouses or taking care of their children.

According to a 1996 study by Barbara Metcalf, the Tablighi Jamaat has encouraged women to participate since the beginning of the movement. Some scholars objected to the participation of women, but Muhammad Ilyas slowly gained their support and the first jamaat of women was formed in Nizamuddin, Delhi. Accompanied by a close male relative, (mahram), women are encouraged to go out in jamaats and work among other women and family members while following the rules of modesty, seclusion and segregation. They observe hijab by covering their faces and hands. Jamaats of women sometimes participate in large annual meetings; otherwise, they commonly hold neighbourhood meetings.

Tablighi Jamaat tends to blur the boundaries of gender roles and both genders share a common behavioural model and their commitment to tabligh. The emphasis is on a common nature and responsibilities shared by both genders. Just as men redraw the gender roles when they wash and cook during the course of da'wa tours, women undertake the male responsibility of sustaining the household. Women do not play any role in the higher echelons of the movement, but their opinions are taken into due consideration. Women and the family members are told to learn Quran and follow 5 Amaals in everyday life, Taleem of Ahadees, Quran recitation, 6 Points muzakera, and mashwara for daily life work and fikr for the whole world as people from around the world will be coming and they are the ones who have to learn before they can teach.

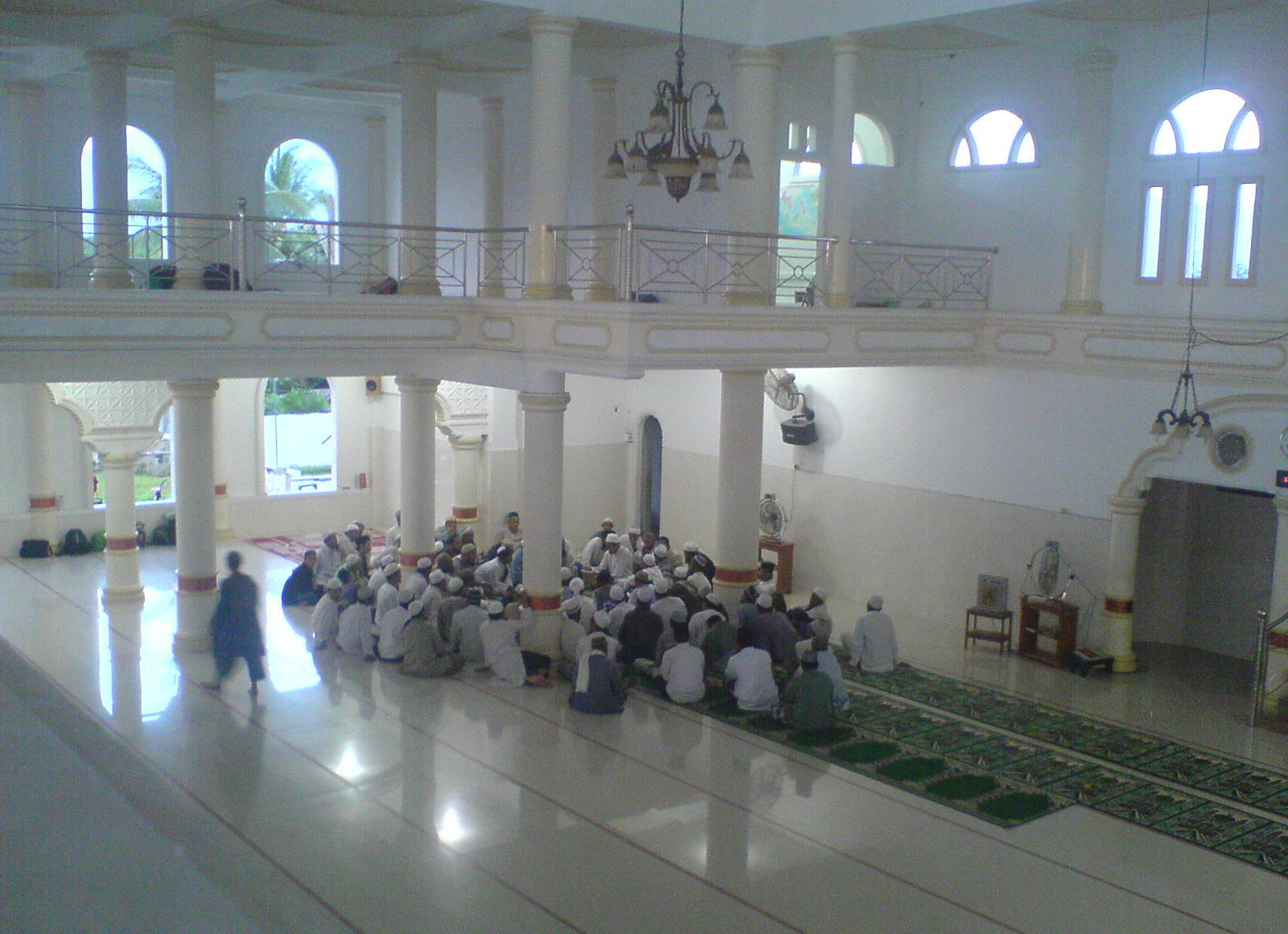
Mushawara after Bayan Subh at Tablighi Jamaat center in Cot Goh, Montasik, Aceh Besar, Aceh

== Criticism and controversy ==
=== Lack of political activism ===
Tablighi Jamaat avoids scrutiny and official ban by maintaining absolute secrecy and neutral stance towards the Political Islam by remaining neutral towards extremist Islamic groups "neither condemning nor supporting their actions" as " any overt connection with these groups is not in the best interest of the Tablighi Jamaat", thus allowing it to coexist even in modern Western world. Many analysts find this neutrality of Tablighi Jamaat towards extremist political Islamist groups sufficient to make Tablighi Jamaat culpable because Islamist militant groups often attend TJ congregations "where they hand out recruitment pamphlets". This allows those radicals to obtain the cover of Tablighi Jamaat to gain visa for overseas travel. "It is thus possible that a [extremist Islamist] flame sparked and fueled by Tabligh could begin to burn out of control."

Tabligh Jamaat has been criticised—especially by the radical islamist groups, such as Hizb ut-Tahrir and Jamaat-e-Islami, for its neutral political stance and failure to assist Islamist forces in the fight against secular or non-Islamist opponents. Specifically they criticise the Tabligh Jamaat's neutral position towards issues in South Asia such as the introduction of an Islamic constitution in Pakistan (1950s), Islam vs socialism (1969–1971), communal riots in India in the 1970s and 1980s, the Khatm-e-Nabuwwat Movement (1974), and Nizam-e-Mustafa Movement (1977). The Tablighi Jamaat, in response, states that it is only by avoiding the political debates that the Tablighi Jamaat has been successful in reawakening the spiritual conscience of the followers. The apolitical stance also helped it operate in difficult times, such as during the governments of Ayub Khan (1960s) and Indira Gandhi (1975–77), when other sociopolitical Islamic groups faced restrictions.

The difference of opinion regarding political participation also marks the fundamental difference between the Tablighi Jamaat and Islamist movements. While the Islamists believe that the acquisition of political power is the absolute requirement for the establishment of an Islamic society, the Tablighi Jamaat believes that mere political power is not enough to ensure effective organisation of the Islamic social order. The exclusive focus of the Tablighi Jamaat's attention is the individual, and members believe the reformation of society and institutions will only be effective through education and reform of individuals. It insists that nations and social systems exist by the virtue of the individuals who form them; therefore, the reform must begin at the grass-roots with individuals and not at the higher level of political structure.

Nasiruddin al-Albani in his book "Darsush Shaikhul Albani" talks about Tabligh Jamaat's aloofness from politics,

Question: The first question we were asked was about a critical issue, so may Allah reward you well, because you have done the mental labor of giving your opinion on many critical issues of Tabligh Jamaat, but here are some more critical issues related to other points of view, which are answered. We would like to know, first briefly, then in detail, may God have mercy on you: The questioner said: What do you say about a principle of the Tabligh Jamaat, in which they say: We do not talk about four things when we go out (in da'wah work), because talking about those four things causes fitna. Because of the creation, these are: politics, jurisprudence, disagreement or ikhtilaf and party differences? Answer: And we pray to Allah, may Allah guide them! Initially we agree with them (Tabligh Jamaat) on politics, but not on the whole. The way we see it, I've said it many times before. We were interrogated in Syria, and there we were questioned by the intelligence agencies, unfortunately as they do in every Muslim country: you are gathering, partying, etc. etc. And I said: This party is for reform, not for politics, and after a long discussion of more than an hour when this Baathist (Ba'ath Party or Hizbul Bas, a political party in Syria) interrogator did not find any way to be considered from a legal point of view, He said: Go then, go and give your dars (teachings), but do not talk about politics, although I explained to him: We call upon ourselves by calling for reform, that is to return to the Qur'an and the Sunnah as you have always heard and all your life. Stay, and I've explained it before, but now you go back to that: But don't get involved in politics. So this forces me to point out a few things to you. It is true that we do not engage in politics. Because getting involved in politics is not part of Islam, it is not right. Politics is part of Islam, and some Islamic scholars are familiar with Ibn Taymiyyah's book "Siyasah Shariah, Qadiman wa Hadisan" (Politics/policy of Shariah, Past and Present). The Islamic state does not fall outside politics, and what is the meaning of the word politics (siyasat)? That is: the policy of the people (siyasatun nas, b. in Arabic both policy and politics both are understood by the word siyasat) and establishing solutions to their problems, according to their present and future interests. We do not deny the need to involve ourselves in politics, but we have seen - and we have proof of this - that leaving politics is part of politics (ايّها المتأسلمون: من السياسه ترك السياسه) (Min as-Siyasah Taraqa al-Siyasah, from Politics (comes) to leave politics (the matter of)/the matter of leaving politics comes/came from politics). One has to participate in politics temporarily or temporarily, but it cannot be abandoned, otherwise how can a Muslim state be established without such politics? But those who should participate in politics must be scholars, scholars must be scholars according to the correct understanding of the Book (Qur'an) and Sunnah (ideology of the Islamic Prophet Muhammad) and according to the understanding of the Salaf al-Saliheen, etc., and that is why we agree with them (the Tabligh Jamaat) on this issue, we agree with them in general, but we do not agree with them in detail, so now we say: leaving politics is part of politics.

=== Ideological opposition ===
Tablighi Jamaat has received criticism in the Indian subcontinent from the Barelvi movement. One of the main criticisms against them is that the men neglect and ignore their families, especially by going out on da'wa tours. Tablighi Jamaat participants, in response, argue that both genders should be equally engaged in Tabligh. They further say that women, like men, are also urged to carry the responsibility of Tabligh and that men should facilitate women's participation by providing childcare.

Tablighi Jamaat has been criticised for being retrogressive. The women in the movement observe hijab for which the movement has been accused of keeping women "strictly subservient and second string".

Salafist and Wahhabi ulema in Saudi Arabia issued rulings "declaring Tablighis to be deviants and forbidding participation in Tablighi activities unless the reason for the participation is to criticise" the alleged deviancy. They also issued fatwa prohibiting Tablighi literature and preaching in that country.

=== Allegations of extremism ===
==== Denials by TJ ====
Tablighi Jamaat focuses on religion and generally avoids political activities and debates, claiming that the reformation of society will be achieved through personal spiritual renewal. It has been criticised by some Muslims for being too pacifist/quietist. Its leaders have denied any links with terrorism, denounced Al-Qaeda, but admit to not controlling its membership.

At least three western experts on Islam have testified to its apolitical, quietist and/or peaceful character:

- "peaceful and apolitical preaching-to-the-people movement" (Graham E. Fuller).
- "completely apolitical and law abiding" (Olivier Roy).
- "an apolitical, quietist movement of internal grassroots missionary renewal" (Barbara D. Metcalf).

According to the American Foreign Policy Council (AFPC), the Tablighi Jamaat teaches that jihad is "primarily as personal purification rather than as holy warfare". Because of its disavowal of violent jihad, the Tablighi activities have been banned in Saudi Arabia and some Islamist groups have accused the Tabligh of weakening support for jihad amongst Muslims. Interviews with TJ members, based on primary research, indicate that they emphasise self-reform, unity, and adherence to Islamic teachings before considering any broader struggles. Some TJ adherents describe their primary jihad as 'Tabligh'—the act of preaching and reviving faith among Muslims—arguing that external struggles are secondary to internal spiritual development. TJ followers highlight that division and lack of religious adherence within the Muslim community make any form of militant jihad ineffective and premature. Furthermore, some members view controlling one’s 'Nafs' (self) as the greatest form of jihad, placing emphasis on personal piety rather than political activism.

==== Connection between TJ and jihadism ====
Fred Burton, Scott Stewart, Mumtaz Ahmad, and Shireen Khan Burki explain the connection between TJ and jihadism by the opinions that

- TJ shares much with groups that have been accused of breeding jihadis -- Salafis, Wahhabis and other 'revivalist' Islamist movements. They share the same conservative Islamic values and lifestyle, strict Islamic belief system and rejection of secularism; they "share the same core ideology and ultimate objectives (the expansion of Dar al Islam and the establishment of a global Caliphate)". According to US officials (the U.S. Government has closely monitored Tablighi Jamaat since September 2001), though the Tablighis do not have a direct link with terrorism, the teachings and beliefs of Tablighi Jamat have been a cornerstone for joining in radical Muslim groups.
- By asking Muslims to "shun politics and public affairs", TJ leaves "a gap" in members' worldview/belief system; since "some people find they cannot ignore what is happening in the world around them, especially when that world includes wars". When jihadist groups "offer religiously sanctioned prescriptions as to how 'good Muslims' should deal with life's injustices", some TJ members listen.
- In addition, Mumtaz Ahmad notes, its "apolitical stance" has helped reassure Muslim and non-Muslim states, governments and others who put severe restrictions on politically activist Islamic groups; it allows TJ to penetrate and operate in these societies.
- Thus TJ provides "a cover, a conduit and a fertile recruiting ground for jihadi organisations such as Al Qaeda and Lashkar-i-Taiba". TJ has been said to enable Al-Qaida "by supporting recruitment in radical madrassas and fundraising at mosques all over Pakistan." Law enforcement officials says that Tablighi Jamaat's presence all around the world and its apolitical stance have been exploited by militant groups. A former homeland security employee described Tablighi Jamaat as a "trans-national Islamist network". According to Alex Alexiev, "perhaps 80% percent of the Islamist extremists have come from Tablighi ranks, prompting French intelligence officers to call Tablighi Jamaat the 'antechamber of fundamentalism.'"
- In addition, some argue Tablighi Jamaat is not as apolitical as it might first appear. According to Patrick Sukhdeo, TJ is an extremely secretive group and the core of the group does not disclose how it operates. Despite claims of being apolitical, it has ties with the political and military sector of countries such as Pakistan and Bangladesh.

The Tablighi Jamaat operates in every sense as a secret society in this country [Britain], as much as elsewhere [...] Its meetings are held behind closed doors. We don't know who attends them. How much money it has. It publishes no minutes or accounts. It doesn't talk about itself. It is extremely difficult to penetrate.

Some have compared the group's ideology to Khawarij whereas others point out that the Tablighi Jamaat takes a "traditionalist" approach to Islam in contrast to Khawarij's extremist and often heretical approach.

The Tablighi Jamaat tried to expand the Abbey Mills Mosque into the largest mosque in the United Kingdom. The plan attracted controversy, and the Tabligh was denied permission.

=== Bans on Tablighi Jamaat in several countries ===
Tablighi Jamaat has been banned in Russia as well as several Muslim nations such as Iran, Uzbekistan, Tajikistan and Kazakhstan, and Saudi Arabia. Central Asian Muslim countries which banned TJ, such as Uzbekistan, Tajikistan and Kazakhstan, view TJ's puritanical preachings as extremist. In February 2020, a counter-terrorism operation in Russia led to the arrest of seven Tablighis and dismantled the terrorist cell affiliated to the Tablighi Jamaat. According to Russian intelligence, the terrorist cell was involved in dissemination of materials and radicalisation. The Tablighi Jamaat has been banned in Russia since 2009. The Supreme Court of Russia also recommended the Tablighi Jamaat to be included into the list of terrorist groups monitored by the Kremlin. On 10 December 2021, Saudi Arabia further warned against Tablighi Jamaat, calling it a "danger to society" and "one of the gates of terrorism", while all forms of innovated Islamic preaching are already banned in the kingdom. The announcement was made by the country's Minister of Islamic Affairs, Abdullatif Al Al-Sheikh. All other Arab countries specifically Gulf Arabic countries including United Arab Emirates, Qatar, Kuwait, Bahrain and Oman have Tablighi Jamat Maraakez (centres) and many locals are openly involved in Tabligh activity.

Countrywide ban
#	Country	Banned since	Note	Reference
1	Iran			
2	Uzbekistan			
3	Turkmenistan			
4	Tajikistan	2006		
5	Kazakhstan	2013	Designated as extremist in Kazakhstan and now considered illegal.	
6	Russia	2009	Banned by Supreme Court of Russia	
7	Saudi Arabia	2021	Warned against by Ministry of Islamic Affairs of Saudi Arabia	

=== COVID-19 pandemic ===
Tablighi Jamaat attracted significant public and media attention during the COVID-19 pandemic.

==== Malaysia ====
Between 27 February and 1 March 2020, the movement organised an international mass religious gathering at the Masjid Jamek in Sri Petaling, Kuala Lumpur in Malaysia. The Tablighi Jamaat gathering has been linked to more than 620 COVID-19 cases, making it the largest-known centre of transmission of the virus in Southeast Asia. The Sri Petaling event resulted in the biggest increase in COVID-19 cases in Malaysia, with almost two thirds of the 673 confirmed cases in Malaysia linked to this event by 17 March 2020. Most of the COVID-19 cases in Brunei originated here, and other countries including Indonesia, Singapore, Thailand, Cambodia, Vietnam and the Philippines have traced their cases back to this event. By 20 May 2020, Director-General of Health Noor Hisham Abdullah confirmed that 48% of Malaysia's COVID-19 cases (3,347) had been linked to the Sri Petaling tabligh cluster.

==== Indonesia ====
Despite the outbreak, Tablighi Jamaat organised a second international mass gathering on 18 March in Gowa Regency near Makassar in South Sulawesi, Indonesia. Though the organisers initially rebuffed official directives to cancel the gathering, they subsequently complied and cancelled the gathering.

==== Pakistan ====
Yet another gathering was organised in Pakistan near Lahore at Raiwind, for 250,000 people. The event was "called off" in response to the officials' requests, but the participants had already gathered and communed together. When they returned, the virus travelled with them, including two cases in the Gaza Strip. During testing, around 40 members of the Tablighi Jamaat were found to be COVID-infected. Another 50 people including four Nigerian women, suspected to be the carriers of the virus were quarantined 50 km from Lahore. In Hyderabad, Sindh, 38 members of the organisation were found to be positive for coronavirus. Raiwind, the place where the event was held has been locked down by Pakistani authorities and the police arrested Tablighi Jamaat members from their offices in Sindh and Punjab for violating the law.

Ninety-four more Tableeghi Jamaat members tested positive for the coronavirus on 31 March 2020 in Hyderabad, in the Sindh province.

==== India ====
The Tablighi Jamaat wanted to arrange the program somewhere in Vasai, Maharashtra. After the outbreak of COVID-19 in Maharashtra, the Government of Maharashtra and Mumbai Police called off the meeting. After the rejection from the Government of Maharashtra, the Nizamuddin faction the Tablighi Jamaat held the religious congregational program (Ijtema) in Nizamuddin West, Delhi. There were also other violation of rules by foreign speakers including misuse of tourist visa for missionary activities and not taking 14-day home quarantine for travellers from abroad.

The Nizamuddin Markaz Mosque added that the officials there"met the Ld. DM and apprised him of the stranded visitors and once again sought permission for the vehicles arranged by us," to clear the Markaz premises and take the devotees back home.

"Under such compelling circumstances there was no option for Markaz Nizamuddin but to accommodate the stranded visitors with prescribed medical precautions till such time that situation becomes conducive for their movement or arrangements are made by the authorities," the Tablighi Jamaat HQ said.

On 21 March the Markaz directed everyone "not to venture out until 9 PM as desired by the Prime Minister of India, therefore the plans to move back to their native places by way of means other than railways also did not materialise."

At least 24 of the attendees had tested positive for the virus among the 300 who showed symptoms by 31 March 2020. It is believed that the sources of infection were preachers from Indonesia. Many had returned to their states and also housed foreign devotees without the knowledge of local governments. and eventually started local transmissions especially in Tamil Nadu, Telangana, Karnataka, Jammu and Kashmir and Assam. The entire Nizamuddin West area has been cordoned off by the police as of 30 March, and medical camps have been set up. After evacuation from the markaz, of the scores of jamaat attendees, 167 of them were quarantined in a railway facility in south east Delhi amid concerns over their safety and transmission of the virus. The Tablighi Jamaat gathering emerged as one of India's major coronavirus hotspots in India, after 1445 out of 4067 cases were linked to attendees according to the Health Ministry. On 18 April 2020, Central Government said that 4,291 cases (or 29.8% Of the total 14,378 confirmed cases of COVID-19 in India) were linked to the Tablighi Jamaat, and these cases were spread across 23 states and Union Territories.

Questions have been raised as to how the Delhi Police, which under direct control of the Union Home Ministry headed by the Home Minister & the then Bharatiya Janata Party president Amit Shah allowed this event to proceed in the midst of a pandemic, while a similar event was prohibited in Mumbai by the Maharashtra Police. Once the COVID lockdown came into effect in Delhi from 22 March onwards, the missionaries remaining in the Nizamuddin Markaz were trapped, and the functionaries began to seek assistance from the authorities for their evacuation. As of 4 April, more than 1000 cases, representing 30% all confirmed cases in India, were linked to the Nizamuddin event. Some 22,000 people that came in contact with the Tablighi Jamaat missionaries had to be quarantined. On 31 March 2020, an FIR was filed against Muhammad Saad Kandhlawi and others by Delhi Police Crime Branch. On 8 April 2020, the Delhi Police traced Tablighi Jamaat leader Maulana Saad Kandhalvi in Zakirnagar in South-East Delhi, where he claimed to be under self-quarantine.

People associated with the ruling Hindutva-aligned Bharatiya Janata Party called out Indian Hindus to socially boycott Indian Muslims. This drew criticism from Arab leaders and the Organisation of Islamic Cooperation; the Prime Minister Narendra Modi responded: "the virus did not discriminate between people on the basis of faith, community, race or nationality".

On 12 October 2020, Mumbai court discharged the members with the order stating they didn't act negligently to spread COVID and didn't disobey to the orders of the Indian authorities.

== Notable members ==
The Tablighi Jamaat has no membership lists nor formal procedures for membership, which makes it difficult to quantify and verify affiliations. One of the most famous and popular contemporary leaders of the Tablighi Jamaat is the Pakistani preacher Maulana Tariq Jamil who has amassed a huge online social media following.

The former chief minister of the Pakistani province of Punjab, Pervaiz Elahi is also a strong supporter of the Tablighi Jamaat. During his tenure in 2011, 75 kanals of land (3.8 ha, 9.4 acres) were purchased for a Tablighi Jamaat mosque at the Raiwind Markaz.

In India, Munawar Faruqui, an Indian stand-up comedian, and Sana Khan, an ex-Bollywood star, and Arif Khan, an ex-Bollywood actor, are associated with Jamaat.

The Former Pakistan Presidents- Farooq Leghari and Muhammad Rafiq Tarar were believed to be associated with the movement, the Indian president Dr Zakir Husain was also affiliated with tabligh jammat

Singers, actors and models, including Attaullah Essa Khailwi, Gulzar Alam, Bacha, Alamzeb Mujahid, and Junaid Jamshed are also affiliated with the movement.

Former Lieutenant General and head of Inter-Services Intelligence Javed Nasir and General Mahmud Ahmed of the Pakistan Army both became members of Tablighi Jamaat during their service. The Tablighi Jamaat also has a notable following among Pakistani professional cricketers: Shahid Afridi, Mohammad Yousuf and the former cricketers Saqlain Mushtaq, Inzamam-ul-Haq, Mushtaq Ahmed, Saeed Anwar and Saeed Ahmed Muhammad Rizwan are active members. Mohammad Yousuf's conversion from Christianity to Islam is widely attributed to the influence of the Tabligh Jamaat.

In Malaysia, prominent actors and singers such as Azmil Mustapha, Nabil Ahmad, Aliff Aziz, Anuar Zain, Amar Asyraf, Dato' Nash and Dr Sam have all been involved with Tablighi Jamaat. One of Malaysia's most prominent actress Neelofa, has also participated in Tablighi Jamaat's Tours with her husband (PU Riz), as a result of which she now dons the Islamic face veil ever since.

== See also ==
- List of Deobandi organisations
- Darul Uloom Deoband
- Islamisation
- Nizamuddin Markaz
- Raiwind Markaz
- Spread of Islam
- Saad Kandhlawi

== Bibliography ==
- Islam, Youth, and Modernity in The Gambia
- Resisting Regimes
- Inside the Tablighi Jamaat
- Islam on the Move
- Ali, Jan A. (2012).Islamic Revivalism Encounters the Modern World: A Study of the Tabligh Jama'at. New Delhi: Sterling Publishers. ISBN 978-81-207-6843-7.
- Ahmad, Mumtaz (1994). "8. Islamic Fundamentalism in South Asia: The Jamaat-i-Islami and the Tablighi Jamaaat of South Asia". In Marty, Martin E.; Appleby, R. Scott (eds.). Fundamentalisms Observed. Chicago: University of Chicago Press. pp. 457–524. ISBN 0-226-50878-1.
- Ayoob, Mohammed (2007). The Many Faces of Political Islam: Religion and politics in the Muslim world. Ann Arbor: University of Michigan Press. ISBN 978-0-472-06971-2.
- Ballard, Roger, ed. (1994). Desh Pradesh: The South Asian Presence in Britain. London: C. Hurst & Co. ISBN 1-85065-091-8.
- Lone, Rameez Ahmad (2021). Tablighi Jamaat: Ideology and Organisational Structure. https://www.amazon.com/dp/1685862357?lsskpint=erf_DP-MW-AUI-PSO_flf_sdrs_vlr (ISBN 1-85065-091-8). Notion Press, India.
- Masud, Muhammad Khalid (2000). Travellers in Faith: Studies of the Tablīghī Jamāʻat as a Transnational Islamic Movement for Faith Renewal. Brill. p. 268. ISBN 90-04-11622-2.
- Roy, Olivier; Sfeir, Antoine (2007). The Columbia World Dictionary of Islamism. Columbia University Press. p. 430. ISBN 978-0231146401.
- Rasheed, Nighat (2007). A Critical Study of the Reformist Trends in the Indian Muslim Society During the Nineteenth Century (phd thesis). Aligarh Muslim University. pp. 317–334. hdl:10603/52379.
