= Raiwind =

Tehsil in Lahore, Pakistan

Raiwind Tehsil رائیونڈ
- Tehsil
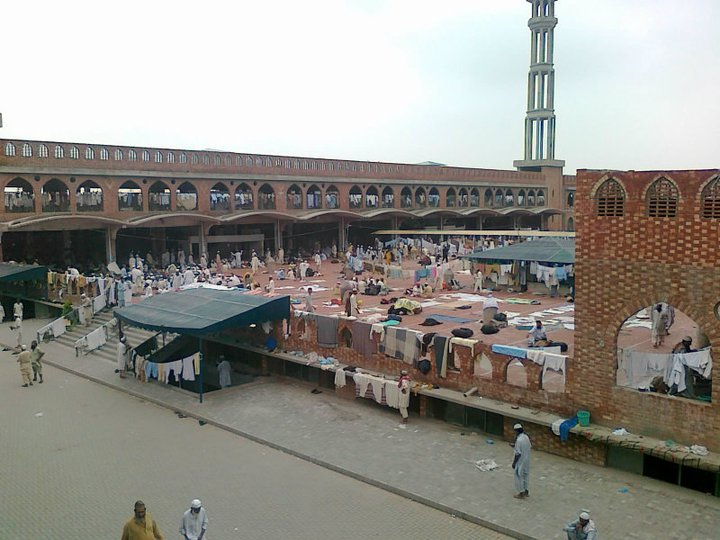
- Raiwind Tablighi Markaz
- Interactive map of Raiwind Tehsil
- Coordinates: 31.2542°N 74.2211°E
- Country: Pakistan
- Province: Punjab
- District: Lahore

Raiwind (Punjabi and Urdu: رائیونڈ) is a Tehsil located within union council 149 (Dholanwal) in Allama Iqbal Town of Lahore, Punjab, Pakistan. The town serves as the headquarters of Tablighi Jamaat and hosts the annual Raiwind Markaz Ijtema. Raiwind is also home to Pakistan Railways Junction and Railways Track Workshop and serves as the political base for former Prime Minister Nawaz Sharif.

== History ==
During the British Raj, Raiwind was a tehsil of Lahore District. The town also became notable when a junction was built by the North Western State Railway between the Karachi–Peshawar Railway Line and Lodhran–Raiwind Branch Line. Before the Ferozepore-Bhatinda Railway opened, it was an important centre for local trade in agricultural produce and had two cotton-ginning factories and a cotton-press, which employed around 200 people. Following independence in 1947, the railway links eastwards were no longer functional.

== Population ==
The population according to the 1901 census was 1764. Today, it is over 855,656.

== Annual Tablighi Ijtema ==
Every year a Muslim religious convention is held in Raiwind.

== See also ==
- Raiwind Markaz
- Raiwind Junction railway station
