= Kandhlawi =

Kandhlawi (Urdu: کاندھلوی, Kāndhlawī) is a nisbat or surname derived from the name of the city of Kandhla in India.

== Alternate spellings ==
Kandhlavi, Kandhalawi, Kandhalavi, Kandahlawi, Kandahlavi, Kandhalwi, Kandhalvi, Kandhelwi, Kandhelvi, Kandhlawee

== List of persons with the name ==
- Muhammad Idris Kandhlawi
- Muhammad Ilyas Kandhlawi
- Zakariyya Kandhlawi
- Muhammad Yusuf Kandhlawi
- Inamul Hasan Kandhlawi
- Maulana Zubair ul Hassan
- Muhammad Saad Kandhlawi
- Talha Kandhlawi
- Iftikhar-ul-Hasan Kandhlawi
