= COVID-19 pandemic in Delhi =

Ongoing COVID-19 viral pandemic in Delhi, India

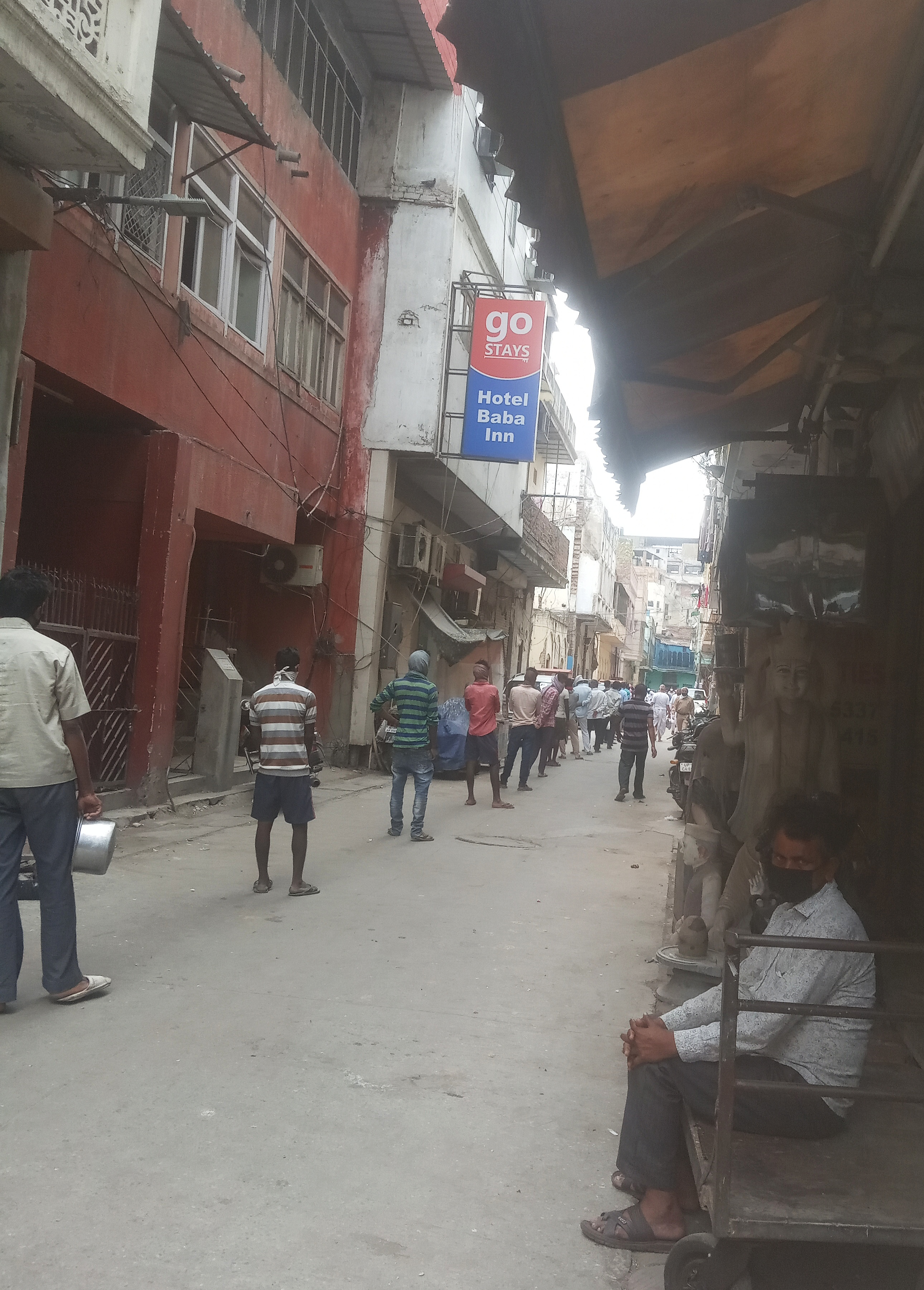
- Jobless migrant workers at Delhi queuing up, maintaining social distancing, for free lunch during lockdown (14 April 2020).
- Disease: COVID-19
- Pathogen: SARS-CoV-2
- Location: Delhi, India
- First outbreak: Wuhan, Hubei, China
- Arrival date: 2 March 2020 (6 years, 6 months, 3 weeks and 3 days)
- Confirmed cases: 14,06,719
- Active cases: 45,047
- Recovered: 13,39,326
- Deaths: 19,344
- Fatality rate: 1.38 %
- Territories: All 11 districts

Government website
- https://delhifightscorona.in/

The first case of the COVID-19 pandemic in the Indian capital of Delhi was reported on 2 March 2020. Delhi has the seventh-highest number of confirmed cases of COVID-19 in India. The total number of cases reported as of Apr 2022, is 1,867,572 consisting of 26,158 deaths and 1,840,342 who have recovered.

On 22 March, Delhi observed a 14-hour voluntary public curfew (the Janata curfew) along with 75 districts in India, at the directive of the Prime Minister. A nationwide lockdown was later issued for 21 days from 24 March.

Thousands of "stranded migrant workers" from Uttar Pradesh and Bihar gathered in the Anand Vihar Bus Station on 29 March 2020, trying to get back home after the nationwide lockdown was imposed. More than 3000 people from a religious gathering in the Nizamuddin Markaz Mosque (in the Nizamuddin West area) were quarantined after suspicions that they had come in contact with infected people. 1300 Tablighi Jamaat were part of this crowd, including foreigners in Markaz.

It was reported that air quality index of Delhi improved on 28 March 2020, after the lockdown had reduced traffic. In April 2021, with cases increasing daily, CM Arvind Kejriwal announced a weekend curfew in Delhi every weekend. Notably, the traffic in the capital city decreased by a large amount. On 19 April 2021, Delhi turned the weekend curfew to a week-long lockdown. The lockdown was extended several times - on 25 April, 2 May, 9 May, 15 May until 24 May (as updated on 19 May). Now lockdown is unlocked on 8 June.

== Timeline ==
Major events of COVID-19 pandemic in Delhi in March
2 March	First case confirmed in the state
6 March	Closed schools up to primary.
11 March	First death confirmed in the state
12 March	Declaration of epidemic in Delhi; Closed all schools, colleges and cinema halls
19 March	Closed all restaurants, gathering over 20 people restricted
22 March	14 hrs Janta curfew, state announced lockdown from 23 March to 31 March
25 March	Nationwide lockdown extended until 14 April

- The first case of COVID-19 in Delhi was confirmed on 2 March 2020 when a 45-year-old person from East Delhi, with a history of travel from Italy, tested positive for the coronavirus. A total of 92 people had been in contact with this person, 14 of whom were from Delhi, and the remaining 74 were from other states. Out of these 14 in Delhi, two were symptomatic, but tested negative for COVID-19.
- On 5 March 2020, the second victim, a 26-year-old Paytm employee from Uttam Nagar, West Delhi, tested positive, having recently travelled to Italy and France. His family members were asymptomatic, however. 91 contacts were found, out of which 18 contacts were from Delhi, and the remaining 73 from other regions
- On 6 March 2020, three positive cases were reported from Uttam Nagar. 105 contacts were found for the first case, 95 for the second, and 11 for the third.
- On 9 March 2020, 4 positive cases were reported. 76 contacts were found.
- On 11 March 2020, a 46-year-old male who travelled to Japan, Geneva and Italy contracted the virus.
- On 12 March 2020, a 69-year-old female was infected.
- On 13 March 2020, the mother of the 46-year-old died. She was the second COVID-19 death in India. Also, a resident of Rajasthan and an evacuee from Italy was quarantined at Manesar Camp.
- On 15 April 2021, Delhi Chief Minister Arvind Kejriwal announced a weekend curfew along with tight restrictions on weekdays in order to curb the second wave of COVID-19 infections.
- On 17 April 2022, Delhi saw a rise in cases, but the positivity rate has relatively reduced from 5.33% to 4.21%

Major events of COVID19 pandemic in Delhi in April
4 April	Provision of ration to all needy persons including those who don't have ration cards.
4 April	More than 1000 cases representing 30% of all confirmed cases in India linked to Tablighi Jammat hotspot
5 April	Total confirmed cases crossed 500
9 April	Operation SHIELD by state government to combat COVID-19
11 April	Total confirmed cases crossed 1000
12 April	More than 15000 samples had been tested
13 April	disinfection drive by the state government
14 April	Nationwide lockdown until 3 May
18 April	Total recovery crossed 200
19 April	Total confirmed cases crossed 2000
20 April	More than 25000 samples had been tested
23 April	Total death 50
28 April	Total recovery crossed 1000

Major events of COVID19 pandemic in Delhi in May
4 May	Nationwide lockdown until 17 May and 11 districts of Delhi as the red zone.
5 May	Total confirmed cases crossed 5000
8 May	Total confirmed cases crossed 2000. Special train to Bihar for 1200 workers stranded at Delhi shelters.
13 May	Total death crossed 100
18 May	Total confirmed cases crossed 10000
20 May	Total recovery crossed 5000
27 May	Total confirmed cases crossed 15000

Major events of COVID-19 pandemic in Delhi in June
1 June	Total death crossed 500
	Total confirmed cases more than 20000
5 June	Total recovered cases more than 10000
9 June	Total confirmed cases more than 30000
11 June	Total death crossed 1000
14 June	Total recovered cases more than 15000
	Total confirmed cases more than 40000
16 June	Total death crossed 1500
18 June	Total recovered cases more than 20000
19 June	Total death crossed 2000
	Total confirmed cases of more than 50000
27 June	Total death crossed 2500
	Total confirmed cases of more than 80000
28 June	Total recovered cases of more than 50000
29 June	Delhi Health Minister pledged to donate plasma after recovery, Delhi CM announced to set up a plasma bank at Delhi

COVID-19 positive cases status (age and comorbidity vs fatality rate) as on 10 May 2020
Age	Total positive cases	Total Deaths	Co-morbidity in death cases	Case Fatality Rate
Less than 50 yrs	4833 (69.81%)	13 (%)	10 (83.%)	0.27 %
50-59 yrs	1073 (15.5%)	24 (33.82%)	18 (78.26%)	2.24 %
60 and above 60 yrs	1017 (14.69%)	36 (48.53%)	33 (90.91%)	3.54 %
Total	6923 (100%)	73 (100%)	61 (85.29%)	1.05 %

== Tablighi Jamaat event ==
The Tablighi Jamaat wanted to meet in Vasai, Maharashtra, but an outbreak of COVID-19 caused them to relocate to Nizamuddin West. The Nizamuddin faction of the Tablighi Jamaat held the religious congregational program (Ijtema) in Nizamuddin West, Delhi. The Delhi Government's order that no seminars, conferences or any big event (beyond 200 people) should be held was ignored. Many foreign speakers violated safety protocols, including misuse of tourist visa for missionary activities, and not quarantining for two weeks.

At least 24 of the attendees had tested positive for the virus among the 300 who showed symptoms by 31 March 2020. It is believed that the sources of infection were preachers from Indonesia. Many had returned to their states, and also provided refuge to foreign speakers without the knowledge of local governments. Eventually, local transmissions started, especially in Tamil Nadu, Telangana, Karnataka, Jammu and Kashmir and Assam. The entire Nizamuddin West was cordoned off by the Police as of 30 March, and medical camps were set up. 167 of the attendees were quarantined in a railway facility in southeast Delhi amid concerns over their safety and over transmission of the virus. The Tablighi Jamaat gathering emerged as one of India's major coronavirus hotspots, On 18 April 2020, Central Government of India said that 4,291 cases (or 29.8% of the 14,378 confirmed cases of COVID-19 in India) were linked to the Tablighi Jamaat, and these cases were spread across 23 states and Union Territories.

Questions have been raised as to how the Delhi Police allowed this event to proceed in the midst of a pandemic, while a similar event was prohibited in Mumbai by the Maharashtra Police. Once the COVID-19 lockdown came into effect in Delhi from 22 March onwards, the missionaries remaining in the Nizamuddin Markaz were trapped, and the functionaries began to seek assistance from the authorities for their evacuation. Around 22,000 people that came in contact with the Tablighi Jamaat missionaries had to be quarantined. On 31 March 2020, an FIR was filed against Muhammad Saad Kandhlawi and others by Delhi Police Crime Branch under Section 3 (penalty for offence) of the Epidemic Diseases Act, 1897 and Section 269 (negligent act likely to spread infection of disease), 270 (malignant act likely to spread infection of disease), 271 (disobedience to quarantine rule) and 120b (punishment of criminal conspiracy) of the IPC. On 8 April 2020, the Delhi Police traced Tablighi Jamaat leader Maulana Saad Kandhalvi in Zakirnagar in South-East Delhi, where he claimed to be under self-quarantine. Many other members of the missionary group have also been booked for allegedly helping spread the disease, including by hiding in mosques, a police official claimed. The Government of India has denied that it is singling out Muslims.

== Government responses ==
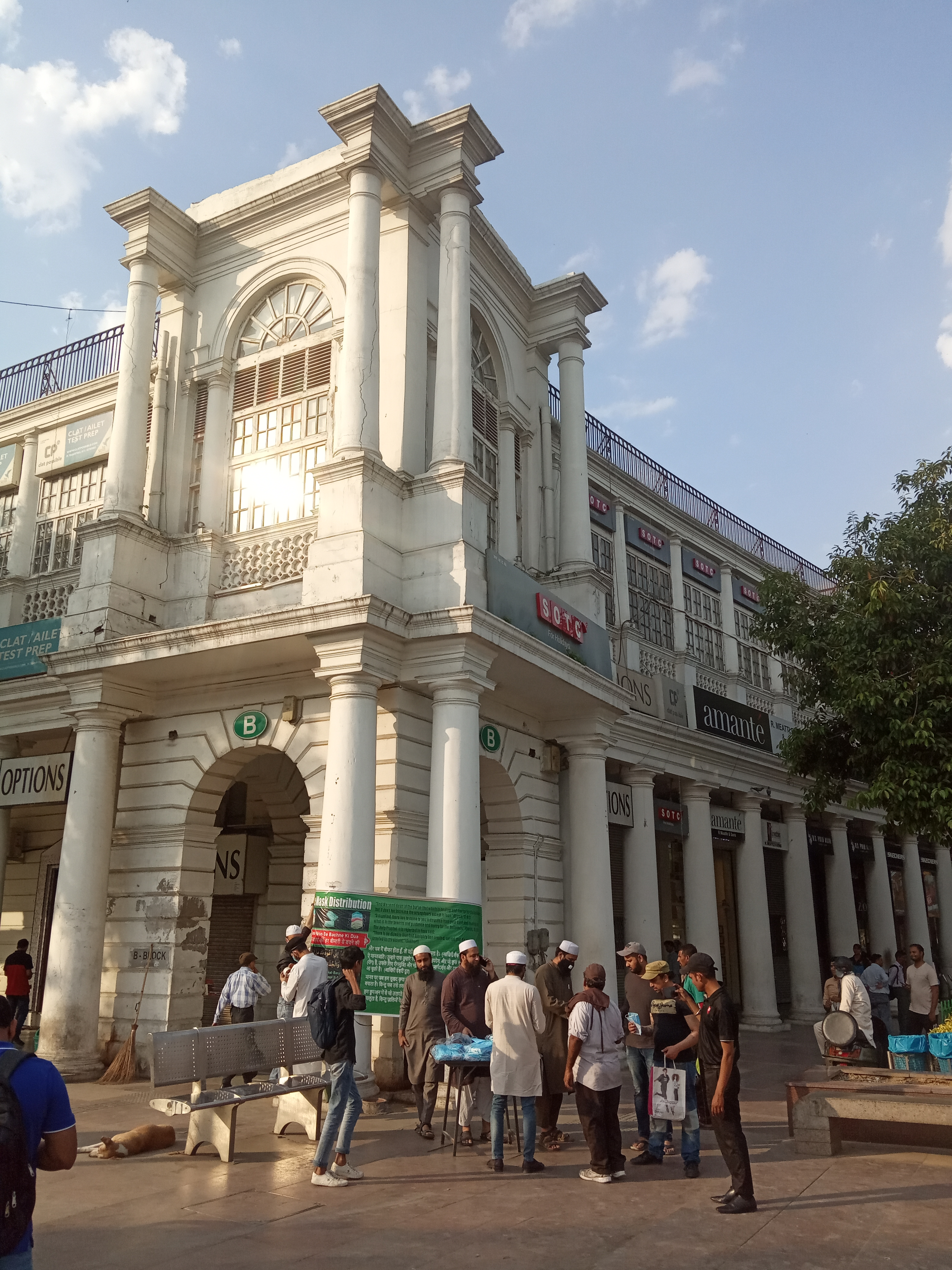
Day before Janata curfew mask distribution in front of B block Connaught place on 21 March 2020

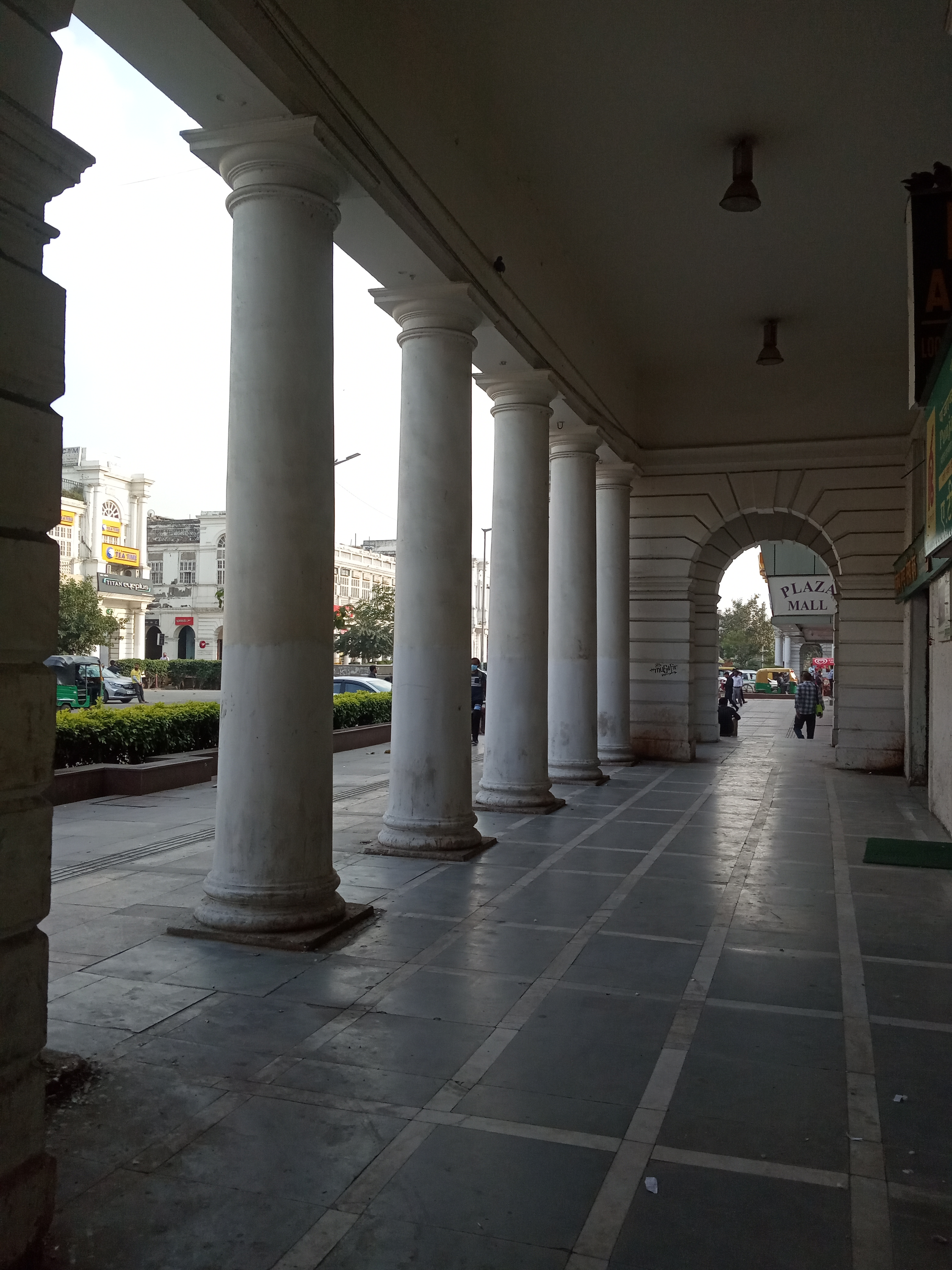
One day before Janata curfew almost empty Connaught Place on 21 March 2020

=== Containment Strategy ===
==== March ====
On 12 March 2020, the Delhi chief minister Arvind Kejriwal declared COVID-19 an epidemic in Delhi. This made the Epidemic Diseases Act, 1897 applicable to the territory. Schools, colleges and theatres were ordered to be closed until 31 March. Other public places, including offices and shopping malls were to be disinfected. Kejriwal also advised people to stay away from public gatherings.

On 13 March, the Indian Premier League matches were banned in Delhi, as were all sports gatherings. Conferences and seminars of more than 200 people were also banned. The deputy chief minister Manish Sisodia invoked the example of the religious superspreader in South Korea, and said that the Delhi government was determined to prevent such incidents.

On 16 March, the ban was strengthened to all gatherings over 50 people, including those for religious, social, cultural, political, academic, sports etc. reasons.

On 19 March, Kejriwal announced that all restaurants will be closed until 31 March in view of the ever-increasing cases of coronavirus. He said that there would be a take-away system from restaurants and dine-in services would be closed. He also said that gatherings could not exceed 20 people. On 20 March, that number changed to 5 people. It was announced that all shops, industries, commercial establishments, and offices would remain closed.

Kejriwal announced that from 23 March to 31 March, all domestic/international flights arriving to Delhi would be suspended. By 22 March, he had announced a lockdown from 23 March at 6 a.m. to 31 March at midnight. All services barring essential services were closed due to the COVID-19 pandemic. Borders had been sealed except for transportation of essential services. On 24 March, the lockdown further extended until 14 April after PM Narendra Modi announced a complete nationwide lockdown, starting from 24 March at midnight for 21 days.

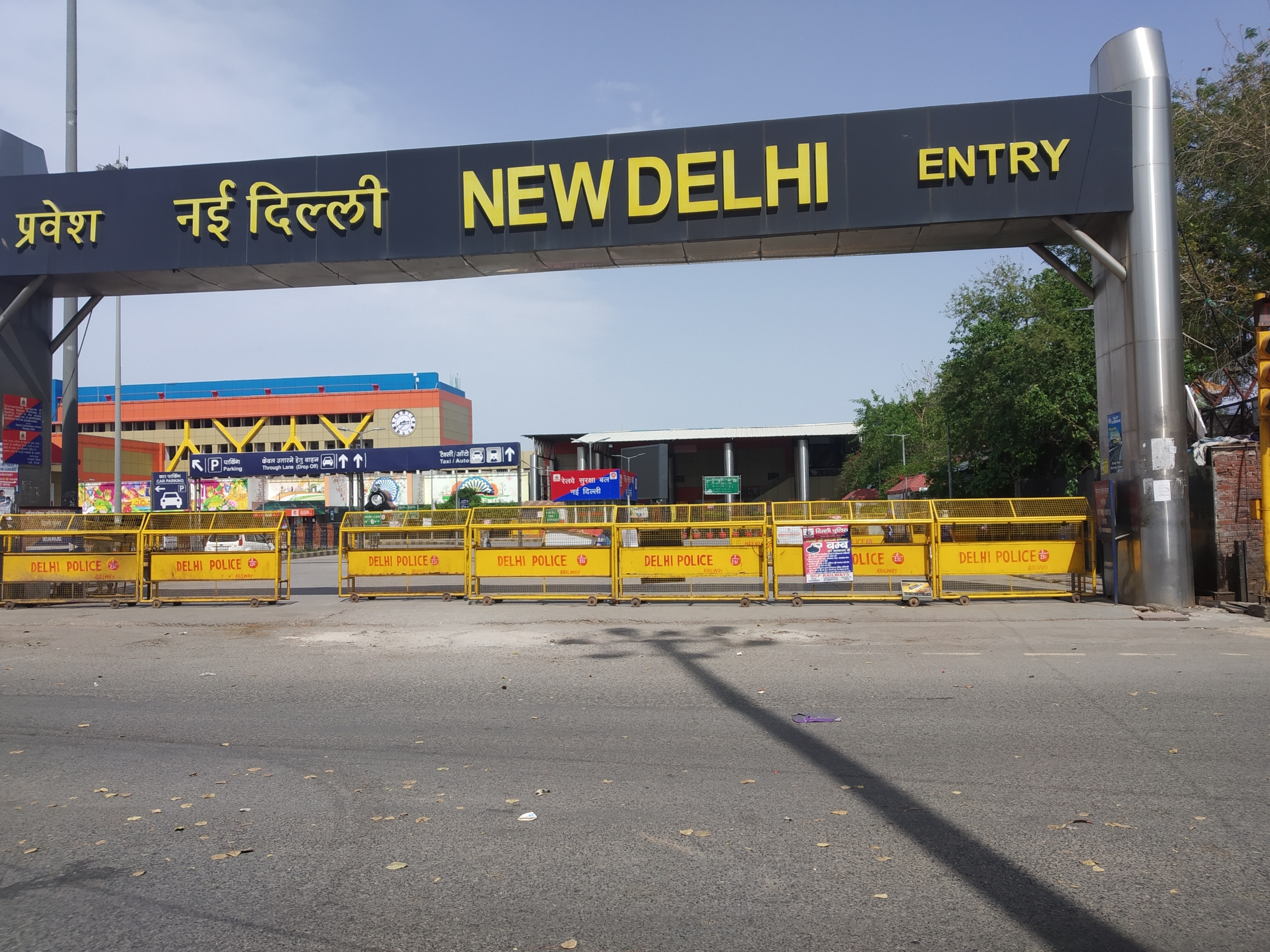
During lockdown empty New Delhi railway station main gate on 7 April 2020

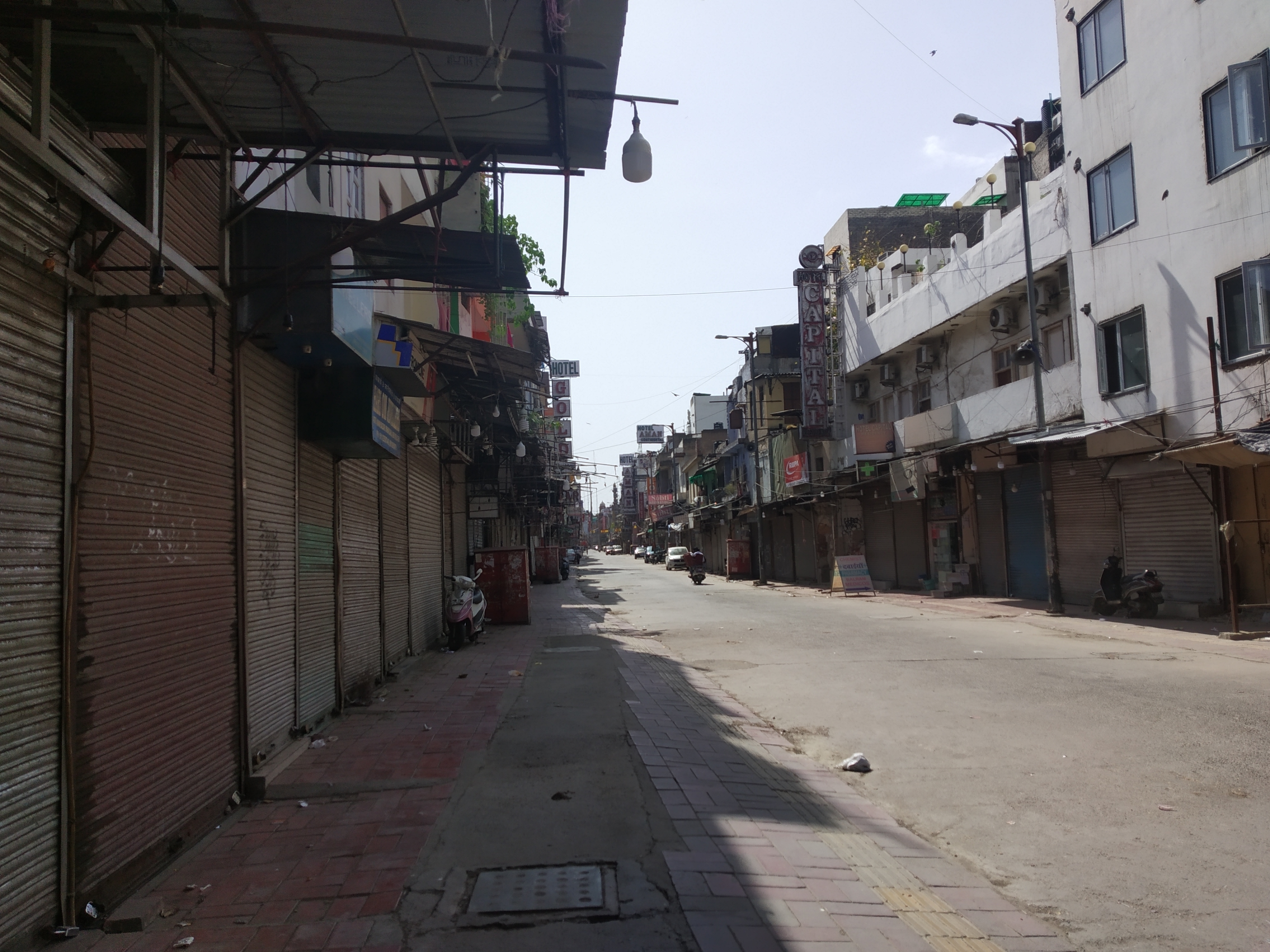
During lockdown empty Paharganj main bazar on 7 April 2020

==== April ====
On 14 April, Modi extended the lockdown until 3 May after recommendation from several state governments. On 19 April, CM Kejriwal announced that keeping in mind the current situation of Delhi, there would be no exemptions. By 28 April, the Delhi Government relaxed some restrictions in services such as health care, inter- and intrastate movement for health care staff (including by air if necessary), shelter homes (for senior citizens, poor people, women, disabled people), services for household needs like electrician, plumber etc., shops for electric fan and school books for areas not declared containment zones.

==== May ====
On 4 May, the Ministry of Home Affairs announced the extension of lockdown from 4 May 2020, until 17 May 2020, at Delhi and declared all districts as red zones. Government and private offices were told to operate at 33% capacity, but government officers up to the Deputy Secretary level would be able to work at 100%. Standalone liquor shops having L6 and L8 licences and those that sold tobacco products would be open from 4 May. Industrial activities in special economic zones, industrial estates and townships, all manufacturing units of essential goods, standalone shops in neighborhood would remain open. On 18 May, the Central Government extended lockdown until 31 May 2020. According to new guidelines, sports complexes and stadiums would open for matches without spectators. Doctors, paramedics and nursing staff will have permission to cross the border without hassle since there were issues near the Haryana border. A nationwide curfew from 7 PM to 7 AM was also continued.

==== June ====
On 1 June, lockdown phase 5/unlock phase 1 started, the former being that the Delhi border was sealed for one week (except for the persons related with essential services), and the latter being that shops, barber shops, and salons (except spas) would remain open every day without restrictions. The Central Government eased the nationwide curfew, reducing it to 9 PM to 5 AM, still including exceptions for persons involved in essential services. Also, the Central and State Government eased restrictions on two passengers in a car with a driver and a scooter without pillion rider.

Delhi Govt disinfection drive during COVID-19 pandemic in Delhi

Delhi government had initiated a disinfection drive in Delhi from 13 April 2020 On 4 April, CM Kejriwal announced that people who don't have ration cards could get free rations from fair price shops.

==== July ====
By this time, Delhi had surpassed most of the states in India, with high case numbers for COVID-19 and a spike of around 2,000 cases per day. This made it difficult for the Delhi government to make further plans for reopening.

==== November ====
After reaching the lowest recorded cases in October, doctors began to express concerns that the city could turn out to be the epicentre of India's first wave of winter infections, with cases by mid-November being the highest since COVID-19 began.

==== December ====
On 31 December 2020 and 1 January 2021, curbs were placed preventing public gatherings at night for New Year's Eve.

=== Quarantine Strategy ===
The Delhi government issued an order making a seven-day quarantine mandatory for all asymptomatic individuals arriving in the city via planes and trains. For symptomatic individuals, immediate COVID-19 testing on arrival, institutional quarantining until the result is out, moving to a hospital or a COVID-19 Care Center depending on symptoms if positive, and home isolation for 14 days in case of a negative result.

=== Sanitation Strategy ===
RWAs undertook regular sanitization drives with the help of the civic bodies, enforced social distancing, distributed masks and reined in those who were repeatedly violating norms.

=== Immediate Relief ===
On 23 March, the CM of Delhi had announced that 4 lakh people will get free food in Delhi from 24 March.

On 4 April, the Delhi Government had started to provide free food for 6.5 lakh people, including distressed migrant workers who were jobless in the current lockdown. To provide food across all areas of Delhi, and to maintain physical distance, hygiene and sanitation, the government had converted night shelters and schools into free food distribution centers.

On 5 April, it was reported that out of 71 lakh ration card holders in Delhi, 60% had received ration. As per the government until 5 April, 50,000 to 60,000 people who did not have ration cards had applied for coupons to receive 5 kg of wheat, rice and sugar at no cost. Some people complained about the distribution of rations in a video conference with area MLAs including other party. Kejriwal requested that they should reach out to people in distress and help them register to avail ration. The Delhi government started issuing e-coupons to those without ration cards as well.

On 21 April, since 38 lakh people who didn't have ration card applied for ration, the government announced it would provide free ration to 31 lakh people. Delhi CM conveyed that the government was providing half of the total population of Delhi free ration. On 21 April, as conveyed by CM Delhi, each MP, MLA of Delhi will get 2000 food coupons for their constituency to distribute to the poor who don't have any documents like ration card or Adhar card.

As one time financial help, Delhi govt had announced to support affected transport service providers like Auto, E-Rickshaw, rural transport vehicle and Gramin seva. They gave Delhi Rs 5,000/- each to those who applied with their current driving licence of para-transit vehicles and valid badge

Delhi CM had announced financial support of Rs 1 crore for the family of any deceased health staff who had died while dealing with coronavirus cases in Delhi. He had mentioned them as "not less than warrior" and this support as tribute to their noble service.

On 12 May, PM had announced a combined stimulus package of Rs 20 lakh crore to restore the economical condition of India due to the COVID-19 pandemic, which is, as per a UN economic expert, "impressive" and the largest package announced among developing countries.

=== Public Awareness Campaigns ===
Delhi launched delhifightscorona.in, a website dedicated to COVID-19 related information. The website has details on containment zones and hotspots, testing facilities, key locations, e-pass procurement and relevant FAQs. It also includes locations of all grocery shops in Delhi, temporary relief centres and hunger relief centres.

== Testing ==
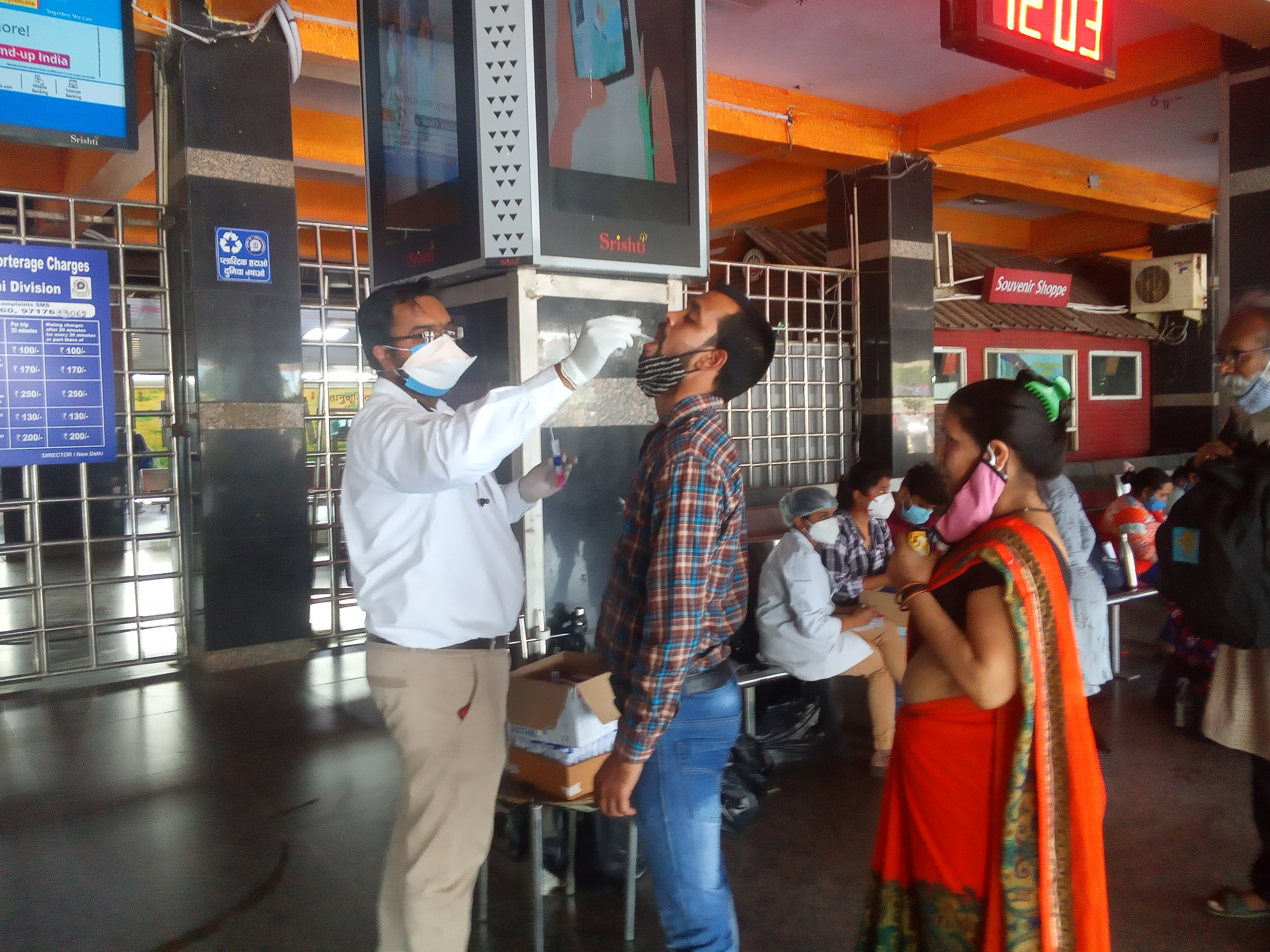
A passenger being tested for COVID-19 at the New Delhi railway station during second wave of the pandemic

On 13 April, in Delhi 14,036, COVID-19 testing had been done in which positive cases are 1,154 in total and percentage wise its 8.22%. Population of Delhi is 201,78,879 (20 million plus) falls under category of the states having population 11 to 37 million and until 13 April 2020, 696 test/million had been conducted in Delhi which is second highest after Kerala in this category.

On 21 April, the Delhi Govt. announced free COVID-19 test for media persons in Delhi after the incident of some journalists in Mumbai tested positive.

As of , in Delhi COVID-19 tests had been done, of which were positive cases.

COVID-19 sample testing status as on 22 April 2020
	Total	Positive	Negative	Pending
Govt. Labs	19893	1875	15848	1881
Private labs	6734	281	5962	473
Total	26627	2156	21810	2354

== Treatment ==
- 13 April 2020, ICMR requested researcher to give a clinical trial on the critically ill patients of COVID-19 using convalescent plasma therapy.
- 15 April, after a meeting, the Lieutenant Governor of Delhi Anil Baijal had declared that Delhi may use the plasma technique to combat COVID-19. He mentioned that it will be on a trial basis with proper guidelines.
- 20 April, a 49-year-old critically ill patient of COVID-19 who was on ventilator support recovered after receiving plasma therapy. This is the first successful trial of plasma therapy in India.
- 24 April, as per feedback of CM Delhi, plasma therapy had been tried on 4 patients in LNJP hospital, with positive results. Two of them were expected to be released from the hospital very shortly. The Delhi Government was also seeking permission from the Central Government to apply this same therapy to all serious patients.
- 3 June, the Delhi Health Department ordered three hospitals in the national capital to provide 10 percent of their beds to COVID-19 patients of the Economically Weaker Sections (EWS) free of cost.
- 5 July, India's first plasma bank to treat COVID-19 patient had become operational at Delhi. Plasma bank set up was needed to have systematic donation from volunteers who have recently recovered from COVID-19 and fulfilled eligibility criteria.

COVID-19 Hospital status as on 1 June 2020
Name of The COVID Hospital	Total No. of positive cases including patient of I and V (as of 1 June)	No. of positive cases in ICU (I)	No of positive cases on Ventilator (V)
LNH	732	37	1
RGSSH	167	39	0
LHMC	37	3	0
RML	87	7	2
SJH	244	31	6
AIIMS( Delhi &Jhajjar)	702	17	11
Apollo Hospital	112	13	5
Max Hospital	193	32	4
Sir Ganga Ram Kolmet Hospital	31	3	1
Sir Ganga Ram City Hospital	97	12	7
Maha Durga Cheritable trust	85	9	3
Batra Hospital	54	10	0
Fortis Hospital, Shalimar Bagh	39	3	2
Venkateshwara Hospital	35	0	0
Manipal Hospital	14	3	0
Other Pvt. Hosp	119	0	0
Total	2748	219	42

Dedicated COVID Health Centres Status(DCHC) as on 1 June 2020
Name of COVID Health Centre	Total No. of positive cases as of 1 June
Ayurvedic & Unani Tibbia College	60
Nehru Homeopathic Medical College& Hospital	37
Choudhary Braham Prakash Ayurvedic Charak Sansthan	67
Total	164

COVID-19 Care Centre Status as on 1 June 2020
Name of COVID care centre	Total No. of positive cases as of 1 June
Terapanth Bhawan	81
DDA Flats Narela	68
DUSIB Flats Sultanpuri	91
GBSSS No. 3, Badarpur	55
Mandoli	158
DUSIB flats Sec 16 Dwarka	35
YMCA	78
Ginger Hotel	31
Total	672

== Impact ==
Visuals of the impact of lockdown on various businesses

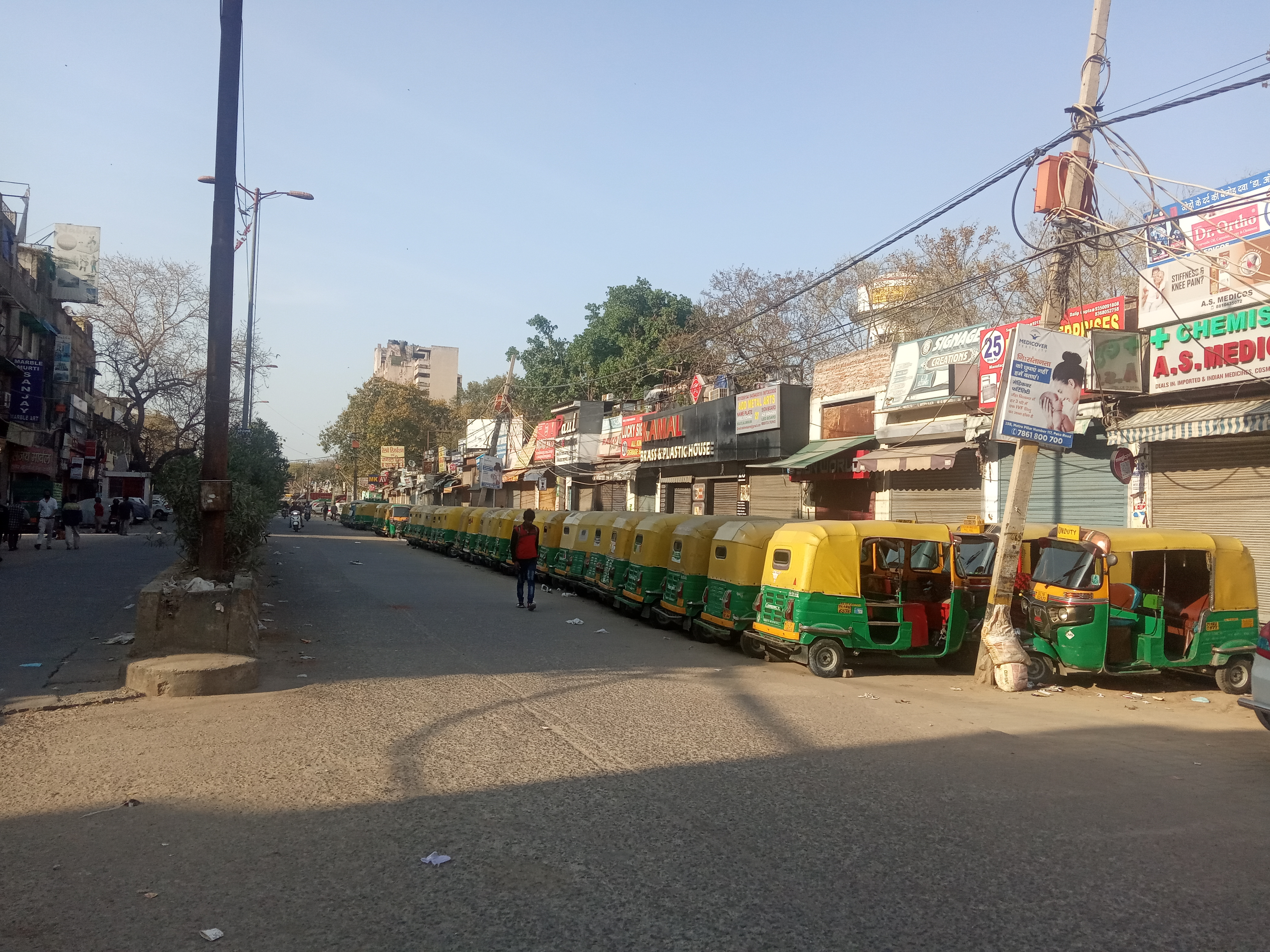
Stranded auto rickshaw & closed shops

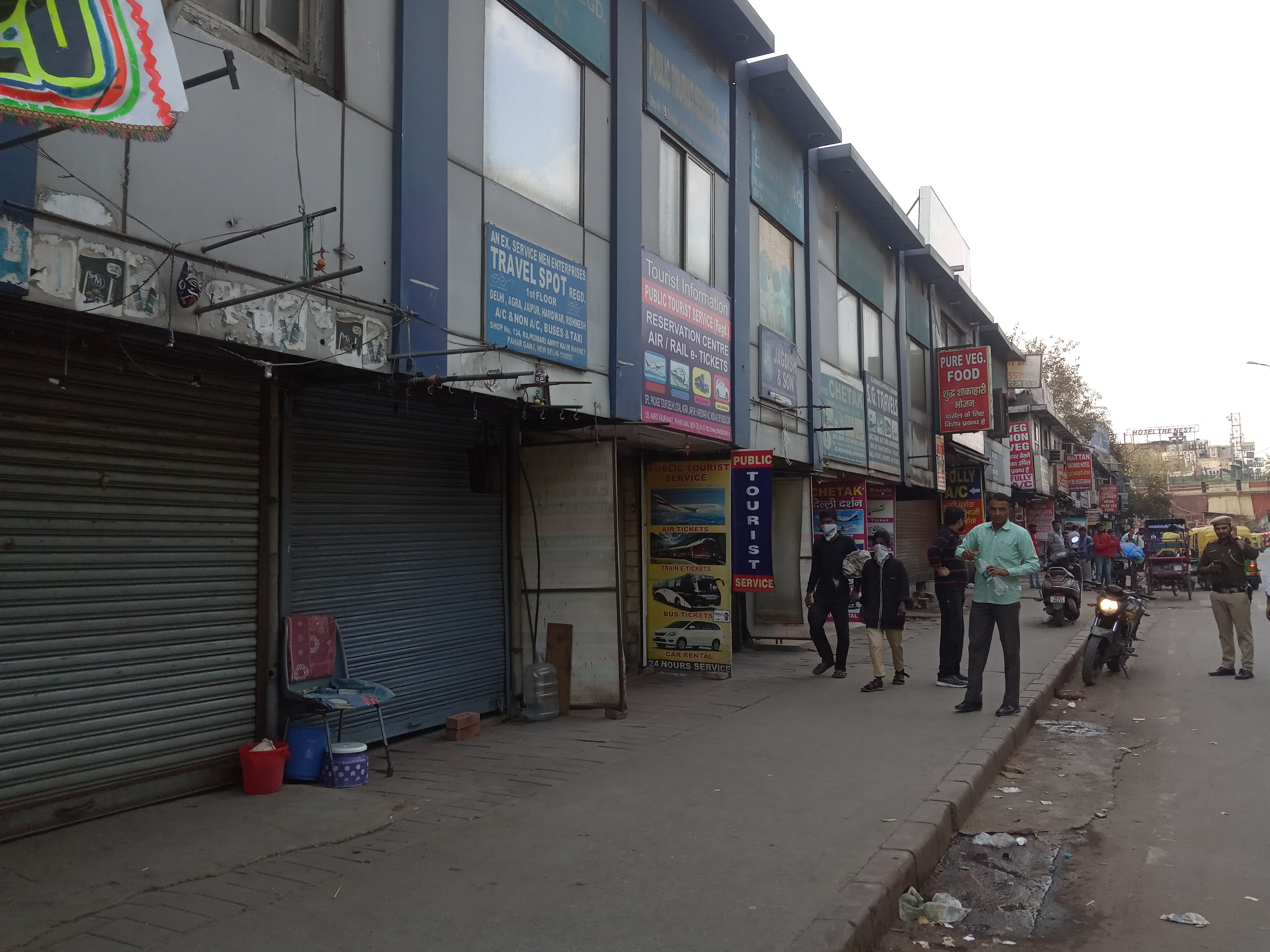
Closed travel agencies, restaurants and hotels

=== Education ===
As of 6 March 2020, all primary schools were closed by Delhi Govt until 31 March 2020.

=== Events not held ===
On 6 March, in fear of COVID-19, the Fashion Design Council of India had postponed their show until further notice. The 2020 ISSF World Cup has been postponed which was scheduled to be held in May 2020. On 14 March 2020 Badminton World Federation (BWF) had also postponed their tournaments due to the same reason.

The National Commission for Protection of Child Rights asked organisations not to feed children on the road, as they were more susceptible to the virus outside, and instead requested that they were sent to the nearest shelter and received help.

Impact on people during unlock phase 1

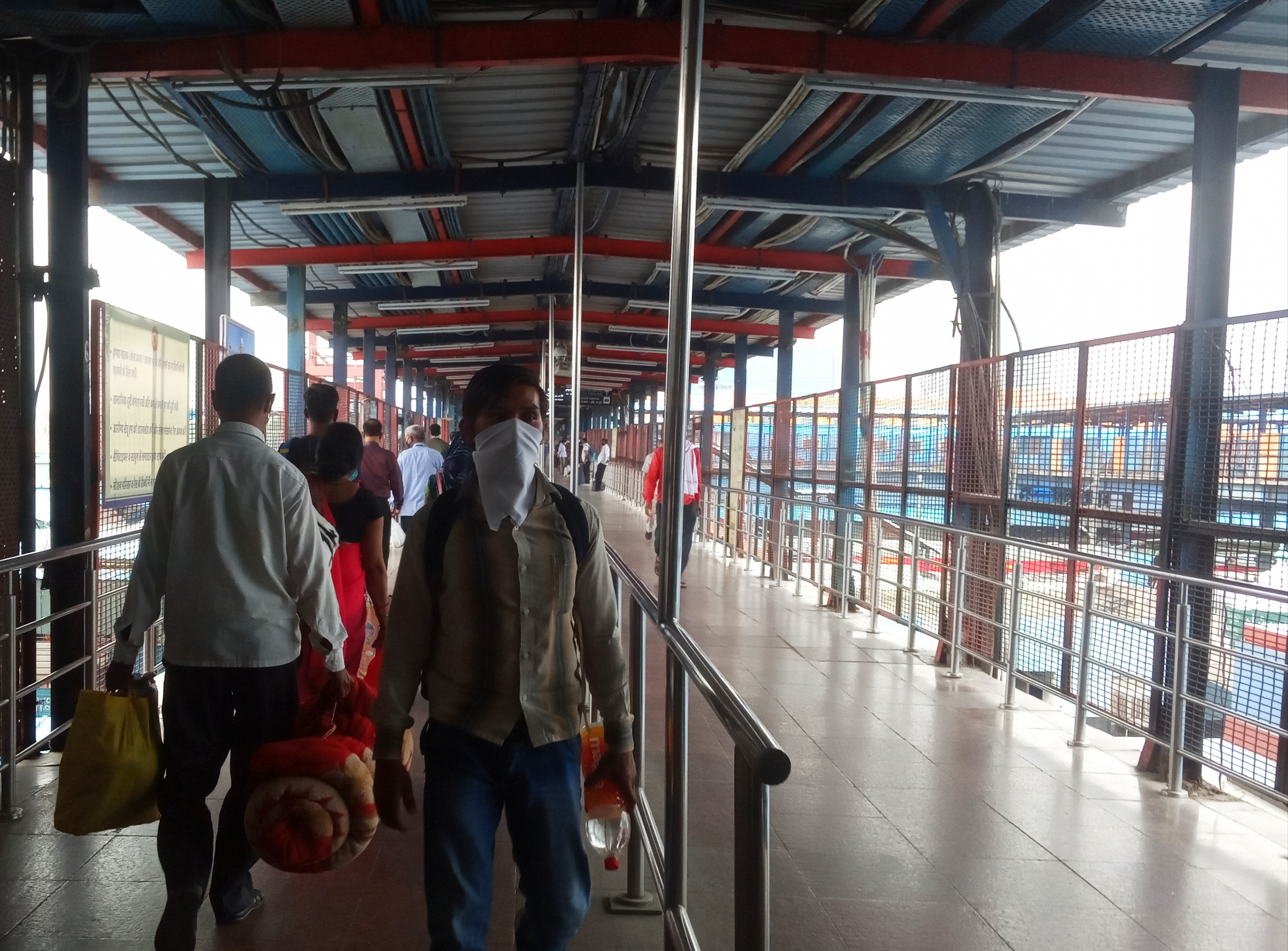
People are carrying blankets at New Delhi railway station due to no supply of blankets in AC coach in Indian railways

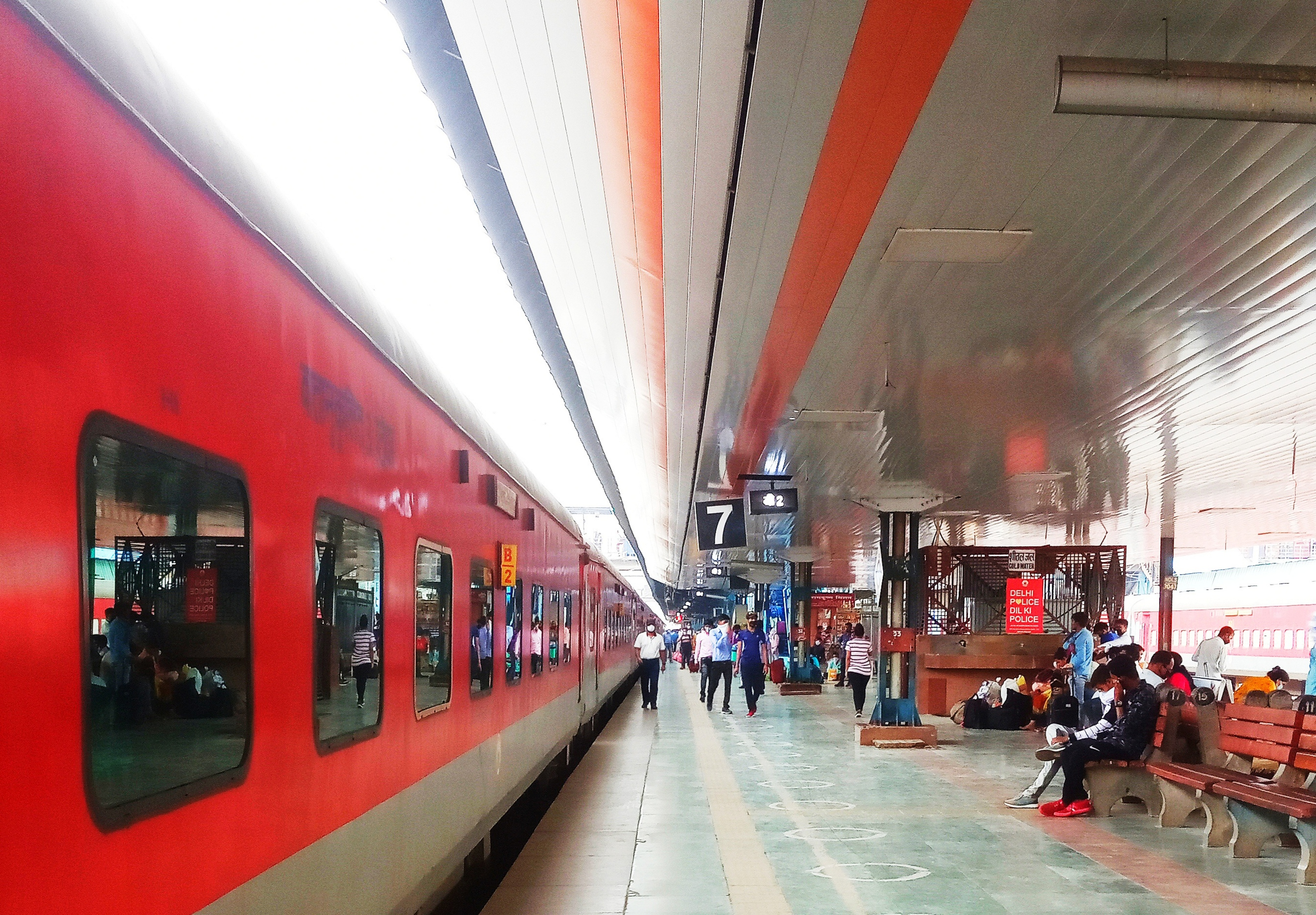
Impact of unlock phase 1 at New Delhi railway station

== Hotspot ==
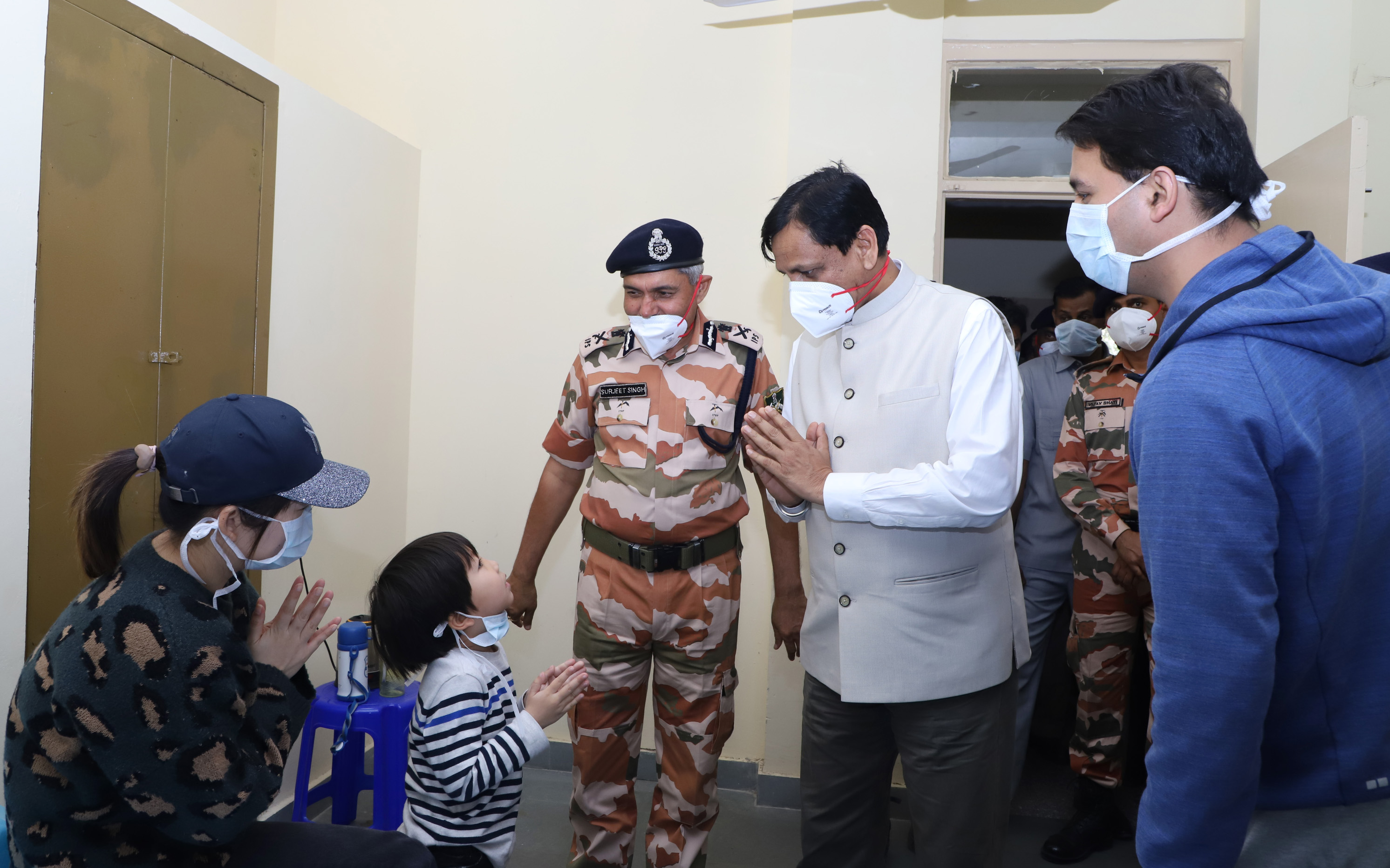
The Minister of State for Home Affairs, Nityanand Rai visiting evacuees at the Coronavirus Quarantine Centre, after completion of their requisite quarantine period, at the ITBP Chhawla Centre, in New Delhi on 13 March 2020.

- On 26 March 2020, Delhi Government had started declaring hotspot areas, starting from a few places in the Dilshad garden.
- 14 April, after adding eight new hotspots, there were 55 hotspots in Delhi.
- 15 April, after adding two more places, total hotspots reached 57.
- 19 April, 77 containment zones in total, and all 11 districts of Delhi were declared as hotspots as conveyed by Delhi CM
- 21 April, the number of containment zones rises to 87
- 28 April, after adding two more places, total containment zones rises to 100.

The Delhi Government announced Operation SHIELD in order to curb the spread of the virus in the containment zones/hotspots. It is a six-layer plan, where

- S refers to sealing the immediate area,
- H refers to home quarantine to all people living in the area,
- I refers to isolation and contact tracing of people,
- E refers to essential supply of commodities,
- L refers to local sanitization and
- D refers to door to door health check of people in the area.

The first success of the operation came from Dilshad Garden, an area where the virus was widely spread. The Delhi Government announced on 10 April 2020, that Operation SHIELD was successful in containing the spread of the virus in this area. The State Health Minister Satyendra Jain said that the area was virus-free after the implementation of the six layer operation. On 17 April, Deputy CM of Delhi, Manish Sisodia announced that the operation was also successful in two other hotspots, Vasundhara Enclave and Khichripur.

== See also ==
- COVID-19 pandemic in India
- COVID-19 lockdown in India
