= Muhammad Umar Palanpuri =

Indian Islamic scholar and preacher (1929–1997)

Personal life
- Born: 5 September 1929 Bombay, Maharashtra, India
- Died: 21 May 1997 (aged 67) New Delhi, India
- Resting place: Panj Peerān Cemetery, Nizamuddin West, New Delhi
- Main interest: Dawah
- Education: Darul Uloom Deoband

Religious life
- Religion: Islam
- Denomination: Sunni
- Jurisprudence: Hanafi
- Movement: Deobandi, Tablighi Jamaat

Muslim leader
- Influenced by: Muhammad Ilyas Kandhlawi Zakariyya Kandhlawi Muhammad Yusuf Kandhlawi Inamul Hasan Kandhlawi
- Influenced: Muhammad Yunus Palanpuri

Muhammad Umar Pālanpūrī (5 September 1929 – 21 May 1997) was an Indian Islamic scholar and preacher associated with the Tablighi Jamaat.

== Early life and education ==
Muhammad Umar Palanpuri was born on 5 September 1929, in Bombay, which is in Maharashtra, India. He belonged to the Momin community, which is also known as the Cheliya community, mainly based in Mumbai and North Gujarat's Sidhpur-Palanpur-Patan Belt, etc.

He did his schooling at Hanifia School in Mumbai, and then received his elementary Arabic studies at a madrasa in his hometown (Gathaman). In 1944, he enrolled in Darul Uloom Deoband, but due to diseases and disorders, he stopped his education after one year. Meanwhile, on 3 May 1946, he got married and served as Imam in Mangli Kandori Masjid, Mumbai, for a while.

On 11 March 1955, he returned to Darul Uloom Deoband and completed the Hadith course with Hussain Ahmad Madani and other teachers.

== Career ==
He was associated with Tablighi Jamaat since his student days. After graduation, he dedicated himself to this work. He played an important role in establishing and spreading the work of tabligh and dawat in Palanpur and Gujarat. After returning from Deoband for the first time, he pledged allegiance to Muhammad Yusuf Kandhlawi in 1955 and later became his authorised disciple. After him, he pledged allegiance to Inamul Hasan Kandhlawi, and then, on the orders of Zakariyya Kandhlawi, he also pledged allegiance to him and was authorised by him.

He was close to and a confidant of Tablighi Jamaat leaders, especially Muhammad Yusuf Kandhlawi and Inamul Hasan Kandhlawi. Following Muhammad Yusuf Kandhlawi's demise in 1965, he settled permanently in Markaz e Nizamuddin, Delhi. After Muhammad Yusuf Kandhlawi, he significantly contributed to the efforts of Tablighi Jamaat, giving lectures for over thirty years at the Markaz Nizamuddin following the morning prayer. He travelled across several countries in Asia, Europe, Australia, and Africa for this purpose. His preaching and bayans are still quoted in speeches around the world, especially in the USA.

== Death ==
He died on 21 May 1997 (13 Muharram 1418 AH) in New Delhi and was buried in Panj Peerān Cemetery.
