= Nizamuddin Markaz Mosque =

Mosque in Nizamuddin West, South Delhi, India

- Location of the mosque in Central Delhi

Religion
- Affiliation: Sunni Islam
- Rite: Tablighi Jamaat movement
- Ecclesiastical or organisational status: Mosque
- Leadership: Muhammad Saad Kandhlawi (Ameer)
- Status: Active

Location
- Location: Nizamuddin West, South Delhi, Delhi NCT
- Country: India
- Coordinates: 28°35′30″N 77°14′36″E

Architecture
- Type: Mosque architecture
- Founder: Muhammad Ilyas Kandhlawi
- Completed: c. 1857
- Capacity: 2,000 worshippers

The Nizamuddin Markaz Mosque, also called Banglewali Masjid, is a Sunni mosque located in Nizamuddin West in South Delhi, India. It is the birthplace and global centre of the Tablighi Jamaat, the missionary and reformist movement started by Muhammad Ilyas Kandhlawi in 1926. The congregation is led by his great-grandson, Ameer Muhammad Saad Kandhlawi, since 2015.

Since 2015, frictions developed within Tablighi Jamaat over the leadership of the organisation; however, the mosque remains the headquarters for the Nizamuddin branch of the movement.

== Building ==
The New York Times described the Markaz as "a tall, white, modern building towering over the Nizamuddin West neighborhood". It is a centre of the neighbourhood's economy, with money changers, guesthouses, travel agencies and gift shops surrounding it and catering to the missionaries that visit the Markaz.

The building is six stories high, and has capacity of approximately 2,000 worshippers. It is adjacent to the Hazrat Nizamuddin Police Station, with which it shares a wall. The famous Khawaja Nizamuddin Aulia shrine is close by.

The complex includes the Kashiful Uloom madrasa.

Typical gatherings at the Markaz host between 2,000 and 4,000 people. During the day, the large halls in the building are used for prayers and sermons. At night, they are used as sleeping quarters for 200–300 people on each floor.

== History ==
=== Early history ===
The Banglewali Masjid (Bungalow Mosque) was built in Nizamuddin by Mirza Ilahi Baksh, a relative of the last Mughal emperor, sometime after 1857. Maulana Muhammad Ismail, the father of Maulana Muhammad Ilyas Kandhlawi, established a madrasa in its premises under the name Kashif ul-Uloom. It is said that he used to go out and invite people to come to the mosque and, on one occasion, he happened to bring Meos from Mewat who were in Delhi as labourers. Noticing that they were not schooled in proper practice of prayer, he decided to teach it to them, which was the beginning of the madrasa.

After the death of Maulana Ismail and his elder son, MaulanaMuhammad Ilyas took up the task of teaching at the madrasa. He too was concerned with educating the Meos of Mewat. Noticing that his own direct teaching would be inadequate to the task, in time, he evolved the practices of tabligh that now form the foundation of Tablighi Jamaat. They involved turning ordinary Muslims into preachers. Training them in the preaching work became the main activity of the madrasa, gradually turning the Banglewali Masjid into a markaz (centre or headquarters). Ilyas also set up an organisational network for his fledgling organisation bringing men of influence to gather in the mosque. By the end of Ilyas's life, Tablighi Jamaat emerged as a national organisation with transnational potential.

=== Transnational centre ===
Under Ilyas's son and successor, Muhammad Yusuf Kandhlawi (1917–1965), the Tablighi Jamaat expanded worldwide and became a transnational organisation. The Nizamuddin Markaz became the world headquarters (Aalami Markaz). According to a commentator, it is "the heart circulating blood through the body" for the Tablighi Jamaat organisation. It is the place where people are trained for missionary work, worldwide tours are organised and information to the entire worldwide network is distributed.

After Yusuf Kandhlawi's sudden death, the senior members chose Inamul Hasan Kandhlawi (1918–1995), a close relative of Maulana Ilyas, as the third amir. After the 30-year leadership of Inamul Hasan, during which the movement grew to its present size, an executive council (shura) was established to share the responsibilities of leadership.

=== Recent developments ===
According to scholar Zacharias Pieri, the final decision-making responsibility fell on two men within the shura: Zubair ul-Hasan Kandhlawi and Muhammad Saad Kandhlawi. After Zubair ul-Hasan's death in 2014, Maulana Saad assumed the leadership of the council and the movement. According to The Milli Gazette, the senior members of the Tablighi Jamaat from around the world met at the Pakistan regional markaz at Raiwind in 2015 and resolved that the organisation would be governed by a shura. Raiwind amir Muhammad Abdul Wahhab who was a member of the original shura backed this effort. Kandhlawi did not accept the recommendations of the meeting, causing a split in the organisation.

The friction led to division of the Tablighi Jamaat leadership into two groups, the first being led by Muhammad Saad Kandhlawi at the Nizamuddin Markaz, while the other being led by Ibrahim Dewla, Ahmed Laat and others at Nerul Markaz, Navi Mumbai in India. The Raiwind Markaz in Pakistan is part of the latter group and has become the "de facto base" of the shura group.

=== COVID-19 pandemic ===
The mosque organised a large congregation in March 2020, attended by approximately 9,000 missionaries, with the majority from various states of India, and 960 attendees from 40 foreign countries. Three major events has been planned, between 8–10 March, during 15–17 March and during 22–24 March. (Note: Media reports have variously mentioned a "congregation" held on 11–13 March, 13–15 March, or other dates, which however do not appear on the Markaz's calendar.)

However, worshippers got stuck in the Markaz building as a result of a COVID-19 government-mandated one-day lockdown on 22 March. The government implemented a nationwide indefinite lockdown on 24 March, and the adjacent police station issued a notice to the mosque the same day, asking for the closure of the building. In the ensuing days, medical teams visited the mosque, and mosque representatives met with government authorities. There was some evacuation of worshippers during this period. On 30 March, the authorities evacuated the building and sent about 2,300 worshippers to hospital wards and quarantines.

International and domestic contact tracing of COVID-19 cases attributed the event with the quarantine of approximately 40,000 people in India, including mosque attendees and their contacts. Leaders of the mosque received widespread criticism from the Muslim community for holding the congregation despite a ban on public gatherings being issued by Union government authorities in Delhi on 13 March.

Several media houses were accused for instigating communal Islamophobic sentiments by blaming Indian COVID-19 outbreak on the congregation and for spreading misinformation.

“The Tablighi Jamaat phase saw hate speech directed against one entire community-Muslims-with very visible impact on the ground such as calls for economic and social boycott and physical violence against Muslims. Hate speech in this period was in some instances clear incitement to genocide and sought to reduce Muslims to second class citizenship.”

— Report: Wages of Hate – Journalism in Dark Times.

Mainstream India media propagated conspiracy of Muslims deliberately spreading coronavirus called "Corona Jihad". The most notorious incident was Arnab Goswami of Republic TV falsely portraying an assembly of migrant workers at Bandra railway station demanding from the government to make arrangements for them to return home during the COVID-19 lockdown as an assembly of Muslims gathered purportedly on the orders of the imam of a local mosque in an attempt to deliberately spread the viral infection among Hindus in an act of biological terrorism. Organisations such as Human rights watch condemned this Islamophobic campaign.

Legal action was taken against mosque officials; and various individuals, both Indians and foreigners. All charges were dismissed. After a two-year hiatus, the mosque was reopened for worship in March 2022.

== See also ==
- Islam in India
- List of mosques in India
- Other Tablighi Jamaat mosques
  - Tongi Ijtema, Bangladesh
  - Nerul Aalami Markaz, Maharashtra, India
  - Raiwind Markaz, Pakistan
