= Kandhla =

- Town
- Location in Uttar Pradesh, India Kandhla (India)
- Coordinates: 29.32°N 77.27°E
- Country: India
- State: Uttar Pradesh
- District: Shamli
- Elevation: 241 m (791 ft)

Population (2011)
  - Total: 46,796

Languages
  - Official: Hindi, Khari Boli
- Time zone: UTC+5:30 (IST)
- PIN: 247775
- Telephone code: +91-1392

Kandhla is a town, near Shamli City and municipal board in Shamli District in the Indian state of Uttar Pradesh.

== Geography ==
Kandhla is located at 29.32°N 77.27°E. It has an average elevation of 241 meters (790 feet). The Postal Code (Zip Code) is 247775. Sunna, Kiwana, aaldi panjokhra, gujjarpur, jasala, bharsi, bhabisa, lisarh, hazipur, dangrol and dugadda, ganggeru, Nala and Ailum 'gadi shyam, are some villages located in its zone. It has a wide range of culture.

== Transport ==
Kandhla is situated midway on the State Highway connecting Delhi to Saharanpur via Baghpat Baraut Shamli [DELHI – Baghpat – Baraut – Kandhla – Shamli – Thana Bhawan – Jalalabad – Nanauta – SAHARANPUR ]. The above route is also accessible and connected by Broad Gauge Train Link.

The major Important Towns and Cities in the neighbourhood are:

- Delhi 50 miles (80 km), on the South,
- Saharanpur 50 miles (80 km), on the North,
- Muzaffar Nagar 31 Miles (50 km), on the East
- Meerut 50 miles (80 km), on the South East,
- Panipat 22 miles (33 km), on the west,
- Karnal 45 miles (72 km), on the North west

== Demographics ==
As of 2011 India census, The Kandhla Nagar Palika Parishad has population of 46,796 of which 24,535 are males while 22,261 are females as per report released by Census India 2011. Population of Children with age of 0–6 is 7788 which is 16.64% of total population of Kandhla (NPP). In Kandhla Nagar Palika Parishad, the female sex ratio is 907 against state average of 912. Moreover, the child sex ratio in Kandhla is around 884 compared to Uttar Pradesh state average of 902. The literacy rate of Kandhla city is 55.43% lower than state average of 67.68%. In Kandhla, male literacy is around 63.57% while the female literacy rate is 46.51%.

== Religion ==
The Lakshmi Narayan Mandir, Jama Masjid and Makkah Masjid Molanan, Nilgaro Wali Masjid, Talaab vala Mandir, Shiva Mandir Jasala, are a few famous places of Kandhla. It is the only town where, Jama Masjid and Laxmi Narayana Mandir are adjacent to each other on one foundation.

== Notable people ==
- Ilyas Kandhlavi – Founder of Tablighi Jamaat
- Zakariyya Kandhlavi – Sunni Hanafi Hadith scholar who wrote Fazail-e-Amaal.
- Idris Kandhlavi – Former Shaykh al-Hadith wat-Tafsir Jamia Ashrafia Lahore
- Yusuf Kandhlavi – 2nd Amir of Tablighi Jamaat
- Inamul Hasan Kandhlavi – 3rd Amir of Tablighi Jamaat
- Iftikhar-ul-Hasan Kandhlavi – Indian Islamic scholar, He laid the foundation of Idgah of Kandhla in the year 1946.
- Maulana Zubair ul Hassan – Indian Islamic scholar and Member of Alami Shura Tablighi Jamaat
- Saad Kandhlavi – 4th Amir of Tablighi Jamaat
- Ehsan Danish - Prominent Urdu poet and Pakistani Scholar
- Dharampal - Freedom fighter, Gandhian and historian
- G. D. Agrawal - Environmentalist

== See also ==
- Kandhlawi
- Kandhla (Assembly constituency)
- Kairana and Kandhla migration controversy
