= Hayat al-Sahabah (Book) =

Islamic biographical book on the companions of Muhammad

'Hayat al-Sahabah' (The Lives of the Companions) is a multi-volume Islamic biographical work compiled in Arabic by the Indian Islamic scholar Muhammad Yusuf Kandhlawi (1917–1965), the second emir of the Tablighi Jamaat movement and son of its founder Muhammad Ilyas Kandhlawi. The book documents the lives, moral character, missionary efforts, and spiritual devotion of the Sahabah (companions of the Islamic prophet Muhammad) based on classical Hadith, Sirah (prophetic biography), and early Islamic historical chronicles.

== Overview and Purpose ==
Hayat al-Sahabah was compiled to present a thematic and comprehensive portrayal of how the first generation of Muslims practiced Islam, endured hardship, and propagated the faith. Rather than following a strictly chronological biography of individual companions, the author arranged narrations thematically under chapters covering Dawah (invitation to Islam), Bay'ah (pledge of allegiance), patience in the face of persecution, migration (Hijrah), brotherhood (Mu'akhat), devotion to worship, and spending in the path of God.

Both the author and subsequent translators have noted that the primary objective of the compilation is moral, educational, and inspirational—serving as a practical model of character and faith—rather than functioning as a strictly juristic (Fiqh) text for deriving legal rulings.

== See also ==
- Fazail-e-Amaal
- Muhammad Yusuf Kandhlawi
- Tablighi Jamaat
- Sahabah
