= Saad Kandhlavi =

Indian Muslim scholar

Muhammad Saad Kandhlavi
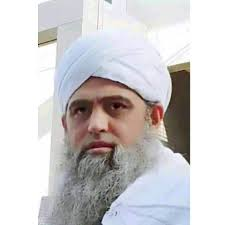

5th Ameer of Tablighi Jamaat (Nizamuddin Markaz)
- Incumbent
- Assumed office 16 November 2015
- Preceded by: Position established

Personal life
- Born: 10 May 1965 (age 61) Kandhla, Shamli district, Uttar Pradesh, India
- Education: Madarsa Kashiful Uloom, Hazrat Nizamuddin
- Occupation: Preacher Islamic scholar, Da'i of Tablighi Jamaat
- Relatives: Mohammed Harun Kandhlavi (father); Muhammad Yusuf Kandhlavi (grandfather) Muhammad Ilyas Kandhlavi (great-grandfather) Salman Mazahiri (father-in-law)

Religious life
- Religion: Islam
- Denomination: Sunni
- Jurisprudence: Hanafi
- Movement: Deobandi (Tablighi)

Muslim leader
- Influenced by: Ilyas Kandhlavi, Muhammad Haroon Kandhlavi, Muhammad Yusuf Kandhlavi, Zakariyya Kandhlavi, Inamul Hasan Kandhlavi, Iftikhar-ul-Hassan Kandhlavi

Muhammad Saad Kandhlavi (born 10 May 1965) is an Indian Muslim scholar and preacher. He is the great-grandson of the Tablighi Jamat founder Muhammad Ilyas Kandhlavi. He heads the Nizamuddin faction of the Tablighi Jamat.

== Early life ==
Saad Kandhlavi was born on 10 May 1965 (1385 AH) in Western Uttar Pradesh's Kandhla town in Shamli District. He is the great-grandson of the founder of Tablighi Jamaat, Muhammad Ilyas Kandhlavi, through former ameer of the Tablighi Jamaat Muhammad Yusuf Kandhlavi.

He completed his Dars-e-Nizami studies from Madrasa Kashiful Uloom at Nizamuddin Markaz, Nizamuddin West, South Delhi in 1987.

== Career ==
The former head of the Tablighi Jamaat Inamul Hasan Kandhlavi had formed a 10-member legislation before his death in 1995 to look after the jamaat affairs. Most of the scholars in this group died in between 1995 and 2015, including Zubairul Hasan Kandhlavi. On 16 November 2015, . He started to lead the Nizamuddin Markaz faction of the Tablighi Jamaat.

== Reception ==
Some of Kandhlavi's statements lead the Deobandi scholars to issue fatawa against him. South African Mufti Ebrahim Desai published such a fatwa on his website Askimam. The Islamic seminary of India Darul Uloom Deoband also issued a fatwa against Kandhlavi, questioning his leadership.

Zaid Mazahiri of the Darul Uloom Nadwatul Ulama also wrote many treatises over this issue including Tablighi Jamat Ka Bahami Ikhtelaf awr Ittehad-o-Ittefaq awr Sulah-o-Safaii Ki ek Koshish (Internal Dispute of Tablighi Jamat: An attempt to mutually unite, and reconcile). Following these reactions, British scholar Yusuf Motala wrote and spoke in the defence of Kandhlavi.

=== Nizamuddin Markaz COVID-19 hotspot ===
Amid the COVID-19 pandemic in India, a sudden lockdown was imposed in India. Everyone was stuck wherever they were with no chance to move anywhere because transport was affected by the lockdown. This also affected Nizamuddin Markaz and thousands of people were forced to stay there. A large number of worshippers from Nizamuddin Markaz tested positive for COVID-19, which resulted in the Delhi Government registering an FIR against Kandhlavi for organizing a Tablighi Jamaat religious event at the Markaz. There was a restriction of such gatherings after 16 March.

After that,they had also sought help from Kandhlavi and mosque authorities to allow for worshippers to vacate the premises on 25 March. The super-spreader event at the mosque resulted in 4,000 confirmed cases and at least 27 COVID-19-related deaths. One media outlet claimed that Kandhlavi was charged on 16 April with manslaughter over the gathering; while another media outlet stated that no charges were ever laid against him. Despite the mosque being locked since March 2020, on 23 August 2021, the Delhi High court ordered the Delhi police to open the residential portion of the mosque, containing Kandhlavi's house, within two days.

== Family life ==
Saad is a son-in-law of Salman Mazahiri.

During a police raid in April 2020, it was exposed in the media that Saad owns a large farmhouse in the Shamli District of Delhi. The farmhouse's mansion is equipped with plush interiors, CCTVs, electric fence, ferocious dogs., swimming pool, some cars, exotic animals and exotic birds. It is a common inherited land and property from some of his ancestors. The media also revealed that the electricity bills were being paid under his son's name, Yusuf bin Saad, further proving his ownership of the house. However, Saad and his offsprings used to live in an apartment linked to Markaz Nizamuddin Building from the time of his Great Grandfather Muhammad Ilyas Kandhlavi. Saad's relative, Badrul Hassan has defended Saad claiming that although he owns the mansion, he only goes there once every month.

== See also ==
- List of Deobandis
