= Kairana and Kandhla migration controversy =

Kairana and Kandhla migration row (also known as Kairana Hindu exodus) refers to persecution and mass migration of Hindu families from Kairana and Kandhla in the Indian state of Uttar Pradesh during the period 2014–16. Media sources have stated that the migration was due to threats of extortion from a Muslim Extremist Mukim Kala, described as a "gangster." NHRC reports and accounts of several eyewitnesses also states that the Muslims (which are in majority in this area) in Kairana town pass lewd/taunting remarks against Hindu females and due to this, they avoid going outside frequently.

The National Human Rights Commission issued a notice to the Uttar Pradesh government regarding the migration from Kairana. Bharatiya Janata Party politician Hukum Singh released a list of 346 Hindu families which had migrated from Kairana. On 14 June, he released another list, this time containing the names of migrant families from Kandhla. Both these list and the subsequent response have received extensive media coverage and were expected to play a key role in the 2017 Uttar Pradesh Legislative Assembly election.

== Demographics ==
Kairana currently has about 1.6 million voters, 33% out of which are Muslims, and rest Hindus and Other religion.

== Release of lists ==
- On 8 June 2016, Hukum Singh, Bharatiya Janata Party (BJP) Member of Parliament from Kairana, released a list of 346 Hindu families that had migrated from the town. He claimed that more than a thousand families had migrated from the whole district, extortionists had killed 11 people and Kairana had become a "new Kashmir".
- On 14 June 2016
  - He said that the issue was not "communal". He released another list of 63 Hindu families who had migrated from the nearby village of Kandhla. However, a few people mentioned in the list were found living in Kandhla. One of them accused Singh of "doing politics" and asked "has he ever come to Kandhla to find out how people are living?".
  - The State government also conducted a survey. A team of BJP MLA's led by Suresh Khanna visited Kairana and submitted its report to its state chief Keshav Prasad Maurya. In a report submitted to the state government, the district administration stated that out of 119 families surveyed 68 had left due to lack of jobs, education and health services. Singh's list contained names of 4 dead people and 13 families were still residing in Kairana.

== National Human Rights Commission Report ==
The NHRC Report had confirmed that 400 Hindu families had indeed left the town due to fear of the members of a particular community (Muslims) which was "majority in the area". The report also confirmed youths belonging to the majority community (Muslims) were passing lewd remarks against the females of the minority community in the town. Due to this, females of the specific minority community (Hindus) were asked not to go out frequently and could not gather courage to report the matter to the police. The report also confirmed the terror of Mukim Kala which had committed at least 47 known cases of robbery, murder, dacoity, extortion and violation of the Arms Act in the 5-year period between 2010 and 2015. The report said the resettlement of over 25,000 members of the minority community in the aftermath of the 2013 Muzaffarnagar riots had led to a major change in the demography of many towns in the region, including Kairana.

== Response from remaining parties ==
Samajwadi Party (SP) spokesperson Choudhary Rajendra Singh termed the whole issue a conspiracy created by Hukum Singh. The latter responded by asking Rajendra Singh to reply to the questions in front of the public. Rashtriya Lok Dal chief Ajit Singh said that in the name of Kairana, BJP had planned a riot. Bahujan Samaj Party leader Mayawati also expressed similar concerns and stated that by raising the Kairana issue the BJP was conspiring to engender a Hindu-Muslim riot. In his report sent to the state administration, Meerut DIG A. K. Raghav noted that more than a hundred Muslim families had also migrated from Kairana during the same period. A fact-finding delegation of Samajwadi Party stated that more than 160 Muslim families too had migrated. They also submitted a report to Chief Minister Akhilesh Yadav, blaming some political leaders for disturbing harmony and supporting criminal elements. When questioned about the credibility of his list, Hukum Singh responded by saying that he had not checked it. Union Minister Sanjeev Balyan also stated that some Muslim families had also migrated per findings of a BJP delegation that visited the region, adding that it was a law and order problem and shouldn't be linked with communalism. Political parties opined that BJP had raised this issue with a view to reaping electoral benefits in the upcoming Uttar Pradesh Legislative Assembly elections. In a press interview, Singh stated that he had raised this issue way back in 2013.

Upon being asked whether he would request President's rule in the state, UP governor Ram Naik stated that he would request it at the correct time. KC Tyagi of the Janata Dal (United) denied that migration had occurred from Kairana. BSP's Naseemuddin Siddiqui blamed BJP and said that it was creating drama over the issue.

== Marches ==
Sangeet Singh Som, the BJP MLA from Sardhana, organised a Nirbhay Padyatra or "fearless march," from his constituency. He was stopped by the police before he could reach Kairana, and ended his march after an initial disagreement with the police. On the same day, Atul Pradhan, the Samajwadi Party's candidate for the Sardhana assembly constituency, distributed more than 1500 roses to the local residents. BJP state president Maurya stated that Som had been instructed not to organise the yatra. Hukum Singh had also made the same request.
