= Zubairul Hasan Kandhlavi =

Fourth Amir of Tablighi Jamat (1950-2014)

Zubair Ul Hasan Kandhlawi

4th Amir of Tablighi Jamat
- In office June 1995 – 18 March 2014
- Preceded by: Inamul Hasan Kandhlawi
- Succeeded by: Maulana Saad Kandhlawi

Personal life
- Born: 30 March 1950 Kandhla, Muzaffarnagar district, Uttar Pradesh, India
- Died: 18 March 2014 (aged 63) New Delhi
- Main interest: dawah
- Education: Mazahir Uloom Saharanpur
- Occupation: Islamic scholar, Da'i of Tablighi Jamaat

Religious life
- Religion: Islam
- Denomination: Sunni
- Jurisprudence: Hanafi
- Movement: Deobandi, Tablighi Jamaat

Muslim leader
- Disciple of: Zakariyya Kandhlawi
- Influenced by: Muhammad Ilyas Kandhlawi, Muhammad Yusuf Kandhlawi, Zakariyya Kandhlawi, Inamul Hasan Kandhlawi, Maulana Iftikhar ul Hassan

Zubair-ul-Ḥassan c. (30 March 1950 – 18 March 2014) was an Indian Islamic scholar and fourth emir of Tablighi Jamaat in India.

== Early life and career ==
Zubair-ul-Ḥasan was born on 30 March 1950 in the town of Kandhla in present-day Muzaffarnagar district, Uttar Pradesh, India. He studied at Mazahir Uloom Saharanpur, Uttar Pradesh, India. He was a disciple, and subsequently a khaleefa (an accredited successor) of his eminent maternal grandfather Shaikh-ul-Hadees Maulana Zakariyya Kandhlawi who was also a celebrated Muslim leader and was an early and life-long booster of Tablighi Jamaat. Zubair graduated and completed his education in 1971. Maulana Zubair was the leader of the concluding prayers at the world congregations held annually at Bishwa Ijtema Dhaka, Raiwind and Bhopal.

Due to his poor health, he was often seen in a wheelchair. He was largely known for his concluding prayers rather than his long addresses and speeches in front of large gatherings as Jamaat leaders before him, including his father used to be known for.

He was initially a member of the council of scholars (International Tablighi Shura) which was elected to run the affairs of Tablighi Jamaat after the death of his father Maulana Inamul Hasan Kandhlawi. After his death, his burial was at Nizamuddin Dargah grounds in New Delhi.

== Death, survivors and legacy ==
In 1969, Maulana Zubair ul Hassan married Tahira Khatoon, daughter of Al-hafiz Ilyas of Shahranpur, one of the sons-in-law of Zakariyya Kandhlawi. The couple had three sons and three daughters. The eldest son, Hafiz Maulana Zuhair-ul-Hasan Kandhlawi, has become a well-known negotiator of the Tabligh movement. Reportedly Zubair was diabetic and not in good health for some time. According to New Delhi police estimates, nearly 200,000 people turned up at his funeral.

Shahi Imam of Jama Masjid, Delhi, Maulana Syed Ahmed Bukhari said in his tribute that the late senior member of Tablighi Jamaat, Maulana Zubair ul Hassan was an important Muslim leader who worked for the benefit of the community. " He remained non-political throughout his life and only concerned himself with matters of religion."

== See also ==
- Zakariyya Kandhlawi
- Muhammad Ilyas Kandhlawi
- Inamul Hasan Kandhlawi
- Maulana Zubair Ahmed
- Muhammad Saad Kandhlawi
- Tablighi Jamaat
