= Iftikhar-ul-Hasan Kandhlavi =

Indian Islamic scholar and preacher (1922–2019)

Mufti Maulana Iftikhar-ul-Hasan Kandhlavi

Personal life
- Born: 10 January 1922 Kandhla, Muzaffarnagar district, Uttar Pradesh, India
- Died: 2 June 2019 (aged 97) Kandhla, Shamli district, Uttar Pradesh, India
- Resting place: Idgah Kandhla, Shamli district, Uttar Pradesh, India
- Main interest: Dawah
- Education: Mazahir Uloom Saharanpur
- Occupation: Islamic scholar, Preacher

Religious life
- Religion: Islam
- Denomination: Sunni
- Jurisprudence: Hanafi
- Movement: Deobandi, Tablighi Jamaat

Iftikhar-ul-Ḥasan ibn Rauf-ul-Ḥasan Kāndhlawī c. (10 January 1922 – 2 June 2019) was an Indian Islamic scholar and preacher. He laid the foundation of Idgah of Kandhla in the year 1946. He wrote more than forty books.

== Literary works ==
Kandhlavi's books include:.

- Aakhirat ki Yaad
- Aamal e Ramazan
- Aashor e Muharramul Haram
- Akser Zikrillah
- Dua Ki Ahmiat
- Fazilat e Quran
- Haq Taala ke Do Makhsos Inam
- Ilm Kaise Hasil Kiya Jata Hai
- Islam Me Amanatdari
- Islam aur Musalmano ke Gair ke Sath
- Isteghfar ki Haqiqat
- Namaz ki Ahmiyat
- Tafsir-e-Muawwazatin
- Tauon Azab-e-Elahi
- Ulama-e- Islam ka Muttfiqa Faisla

== Death ==
Kandhlavi died on 2 June 2019, coinciding with the Islamic date of 27 Ramadan 1440 AH, in Kandhla, at the age of 97. All the markets in the city remained closed for mourning the death of the preacher. According to news reports, lakhs of people from Shamli and adjoining districts joined the funeral procession. Muslims as well as people following other religions joined the procession. The local police chief and politicians also attended the funeral. Special arrangements for the managing the traffic and the huge crowd in the processions were made by the local administration.

== See also ==
- List of Deobandis
