= Ilyas Kandhlavi =

First Amir of Tablighi Jamaat (1885-1944)

Muhammad Ilyas Kandhlavi
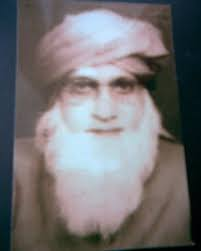

1st Amir of Tablighi Jamaat
- Preceded by: Position established
- Succeeded by: Muhammad Yusuf Kandhlawi

Personal life
- Born: Akhtar Ilyas; 1885 (1302 Hijri year) Kandhla, Muzaffarnagar, North-Western Provinces, British India
- Died: July 13, 1944 (aged 58–59) (1363 Hijri year) Delhi, British India
- Resting place: india
- Main interest: Da'wah
- Notable work: Tablighi Jamaat
- Education: Darul Uloom Deoband
- Known for: Founder of Tableeghi Jamaat
- Occupation: Da'i

Religious life
- Religion: Islam
- Denomination: Sunni
- Jurisprudence: Hanafi
- Movement: Deobandi

Muslim leader
- Disciple of: Rashid Ahmad Gangohi; Muhammad Ismail Kandhlavi; Khalil Ahmad Saharanpuri; Muhammad Yahya Kandhlavi
- Influenced by: Rashid Ahmad Gangohi Muhammad Ismail Kandhlavi Khalil Ahmad Saharanpuri Muhammad Kandhlavi Muhammad Yahya Kandhlavi Hussain Ahmad Madani Abdul Qadir Raipuri Ashraf Ali Thanwi
- Influenced: Zakariyya Kandhlavi Abul Hasan Ali Hasani Nadwi Manzur Nu'mani Ihteshamul Hasan Kandhlavi Saeed Ahmad Khan Makki Muhammad Yusuf Kandhlawi Inamul Hasan Kandhlawi Muhammad Abdul Wahhab Abdul Muqeet Izhar ul Hassan Iftikhar-ul-Hasan Kandhlawi Maulana Zubair ul Hassan Muhammad Saad Kandhlawi Tariq Jameel Israr Ahmed

Muḥammad Ilyās ibn Muḥammad Ismā‘īl Kāndhlawī Dihlawī (1885 – 13 July 1944) was an Indian Islamic scholar of the Deobandi movement who founded the Tablighi Jamaat, in 1925, in Mewat province.

== Early life and education ==
Muhammad Ilyas was born in 1303 AH (1885/1886) in the village of Kandhla, Muzaffarnagar district, North-West Provinces, British India (in present-day Shamli district, Uttar Pradesh, India). His year of birth can be computed by the tarikhi (chronogrammatic) name "Akhtar Ilyas" (اختر الیاس) using abjad numerals.

In a local maktab (school), he memorised one and a quarter Ajza' of the Qur'an, and he completed memorising the Qur'an under his father's supervision in Nizamuddin area, Delhi. Thereafter, he studied the elementary books of Arabic and Persian language mostly under his father. Later on, he lived with and studied under Rashid Ahmad Gangohi. In 1905, Rashid Ahmad Gangohi died, when Muhammad Ilyas was 20. In 1908, Muhammad Ilyas enrolled in Darul Uloom Deoband. He also studied under Mahmud Hasan Deobandi.

== Foundation of Tablighi Jamaat ==
In the early 1920s, he prepared a team of young madrasah graduates from Deoband and Saharanpur and sent them to Mewat to establish a network of mosques and Islamic schools movement. He once said that if he had to attribute a name to his movement, it would have been Tehreek-e-Imaan ('Imaan/Faith Movement'). The people of South Asia started calling the devotees Tableeghi and this name eventually became popular among the common people. The Tablighi Jamaat has since gone on to become one of the most widespread grassroots Islamic movements in the world with a presence in many countries, including Canada, South Africa and the UK.

== Legacy ==
Abul Hasan Ali Hasani Nadwi wrote a biography named Life and Mission of Maulana Mohammad Ilyas.
