= Inamul Hasan Kandhlavi =

Third Amir of Tablighi Jamat (1918–1995)

Hazratji Inamul Hasan Kandhlawi

3rd Amir of Tablighi Jamat
- In office April 1965 – 10 June 1995
- Preceded by: Muhammad Yusuf Kandhlawi
- Succeeded by: Zubair ul Hassan Kandhlawi

Personal life
- Born: 20 February 1918 Kandhla, United Provinces, British India
- Died: 10 June 1995 (aged 77) New Delhi, India
- Resting place: Nizamuddin Dargah grounds, New Delhi
- Main interest: Dawah
- Notable work: Spreading the responsibility of Tablighi effort all over the world
- Education: Mazahir Uloom, Saharanpur; Kashiful Uloom Nizamuddin

Religious life
- Religion: Islam
- Denomination: Sunni
- Jurisprudence: Hanafi
- Tariqa: Chishtiya (Sabiriya-Imdadiya)
- Movement: Deobandi (specially, Tablighi Jamaat)

Muslim leader
- Disciple of: Muhammad Ilyas Kandhlawi; Muhammad Yusuf Kandhlawi
- Influenced by: Muhammad Ilyas Kandhlawi Muhammad Yusuf Kandhlawi Zakariyya Kandhlawi
- Influenced: Izhar ul Hasan Maulana Zubair ul Hassan Saeed Ahmad Khan Makki Muhammad Saad Kandhlawi Muhammad Abdul Wahhab

Muḥammad In‘āmul-Ḥasan Kāndhlawī (20 February 1918 – 10 June 1995) was an Indian Islamic scholar who served as the third Amir of the Tablighi Jamaat from 1965 to 1995.

== Early life and career ==
Inamul Hasan was born on 20 February 1918 in Kandhla town, near Saharanpur, Uttar Pradesh, India. He received his basic religious education at Madrassa Kashif-ul-Uloom Nizamuddin New Delhi and then at Mazahir Uloom Saharanpur and then spent the rest of his life working for Tablighi Jamat.

He married Sheikh ul Hadith Zakariyya Kandhlawi's second daughter. He was appointed the third Ameer (leader) of Tablighi Jamaat by Sheikh-ul-Hadith after the death of Muhammad Yusuf Kandhlawi in 1965 and served over 30 years as the leader of Tablighi Jamaat until his death in 1995.

== Death and legacy ==
Inamul Hasan Kandhlawi died on 10 June 1995. He was well-versed in the ilm-e-Hadith (knowledge of the traditions of Muhammad). During his term, he made a Shura (an advisory body and a consultative system) in every country where the Jamaat was active for smooth functioning of the mission. He discharged his responsibility as the Amir of Tablighi Jamaat with foresight and courage. The then Prime Minister of India PV Narasimha Rao condoled his death.

== Bibliography ==
- Masud, Muhammad Khalid (2000), Travellers in faith, GoogleBooks: BRILL, p. 268, ISBN 90-04-11622-2
- "Maulana Inaamul Hasan Kandhlawi; Third Ameer of Tableeghi Jamaat (RA)". central-mosque.com.
