= Nizamuddin West =

- Neighborhood of Delhi
- Location in Delhi, India
- Coordinates: 28°35′N 77°15′E
- Country: India
- State: Delhi
- District: South east Delhi

Languages
  - Official: Hindi
- Time zone: UTC+5:30 (IST)
- Planning agency: MCD

Nizamuddin West is an upscale residential locality, located south of the India Gate. It is a historically busy neighbourhood in South Delhi and has many parks and trees. It sits in the green lung of Delhi, with Humayun's Tomb, Sunder Nursery and Delhi Golf club around it. The popular landmarks around it are Khan Market, Sunder Nursery Lodi Garden, Oberoi Hotel, Lodhi Hotel.

== History ==
The Nizamuddin West locality located in South Delhi is named after 13th century Sufi saint, Nizamuddin Auliya, whose shrine or dargah in Urdu is situated within the area.

The colony has been home to noted writers, scholars and freedom fighters in the past. Noted Islamic scholar and peace activist, Padam Bhushan Maulana Wahiduddin Khan lives here. The first Chief Executive Councillor of Delhi and veteran freedom fighter Padma Shri Mir Mushtaq Ahmad resided here. Amarnath Vidyalankar, freedom fighter and former MP was also a resident.

== Historic sites ==
- The tomb of Nizamuddin Auliya
- The Jama 'at-Khana-Masjid or Khalji mosque built in 1325 by Khizr Khan, son of Alauddin Khalji
- The shrine to Amir Khusrow
- The grave of the 19th-century Urdu poet Mirza Ghalib and the adjacent Ghalib Academy
- The tomb of Khan i Jahan Tilangani.
- Kalan Masjid
- Banglewali Masjid Nizammudin

== See also ==
- List of Monuments of National Importance in Delhi
- Lodi Gardens
- Humayun's Tomb
- Tomb of Bahlol Lodi
