= Yusuf Kandhlavi =

Second Amir of Tablighi Jamaat (1917–1965)

Muhammad Yusuf Kandhlawi

2nd Amir of Tablighi Jamaat
- In office 1944–1965
- Preceded by: Muhammad Ilyas Kandhalwi
- Succeeded by: Inamul Hasan Kandhlawi

Personal life
- Born: 20 March 1917
- Died: 2 April 1965 (aged 48) Lahore, West Pakistan, Pakistan
- Main interest(s): Basic principles and practices of Islam
- Notable work(s): Hayat al-Sahaba, Amani al-Ahbar fi Sharh Ma'ani al-Athar, Muntakhab Ahadith, Six Points
- Education: Mazahir Uloom Saharanpur

Religious life
- Religion: Islam
- Denomination: Sunni
- Jurisprudence: Hanafi
- Movement: Deobandi

Muslim leader
- Disciple of: Muhammad Ilyas Kandhlawi
- Influenced by: Muhammad Ilyas Kandhlawi, Khalil Ahmad Saharanpuri, Zakariyya Kandhlawi
- Influenced: Hafiz Patel, Muhammad Umar Palanpuri

Muhammad Yusuf Kandhlawi (20 March 1917 – 2 April 1965) was an Indian Islamic scholar who became the second ameer of the Tablighi Jamaat.

== Biography ==
Kandhlawi memorized the Quran at the age of ten, from Hafiz Imam Khan Mewati. Syed Ahmad Faizabadi, the elder brother of Syed Hussain Ahmad Madani, sent an honorary degree to Yusuf commemorating his memorization of the Quran.

He graduated afrom Mazahir Uloom at the age of 20, in 1936 (1355 AH).

He died in Lahore in 1965, at the age of 48. His funeral at Delhi was attended by at least two hundred thousand mourners. His funeral prayer was led by Zakariyya Kandhlawi and was buried next to the grave of his father Muhammad Ilyas Kandhlawi.

== Literary works ==
Books Written
Title	Description	Volumes	Language
Hayat Al-Sahabah	The Prophet's Companions' Way of Life	3	Arabic
Amani al-Ahbar fi Sharh Ma'ani al-Athar	an annotation of a major work by Imam Ahmad Al-Tahawi	4	
Muntakhab Ahadith			Urdu/Arabic

== See also ==
- List of Deobandis
