= List of Deobandis =

Deobandis
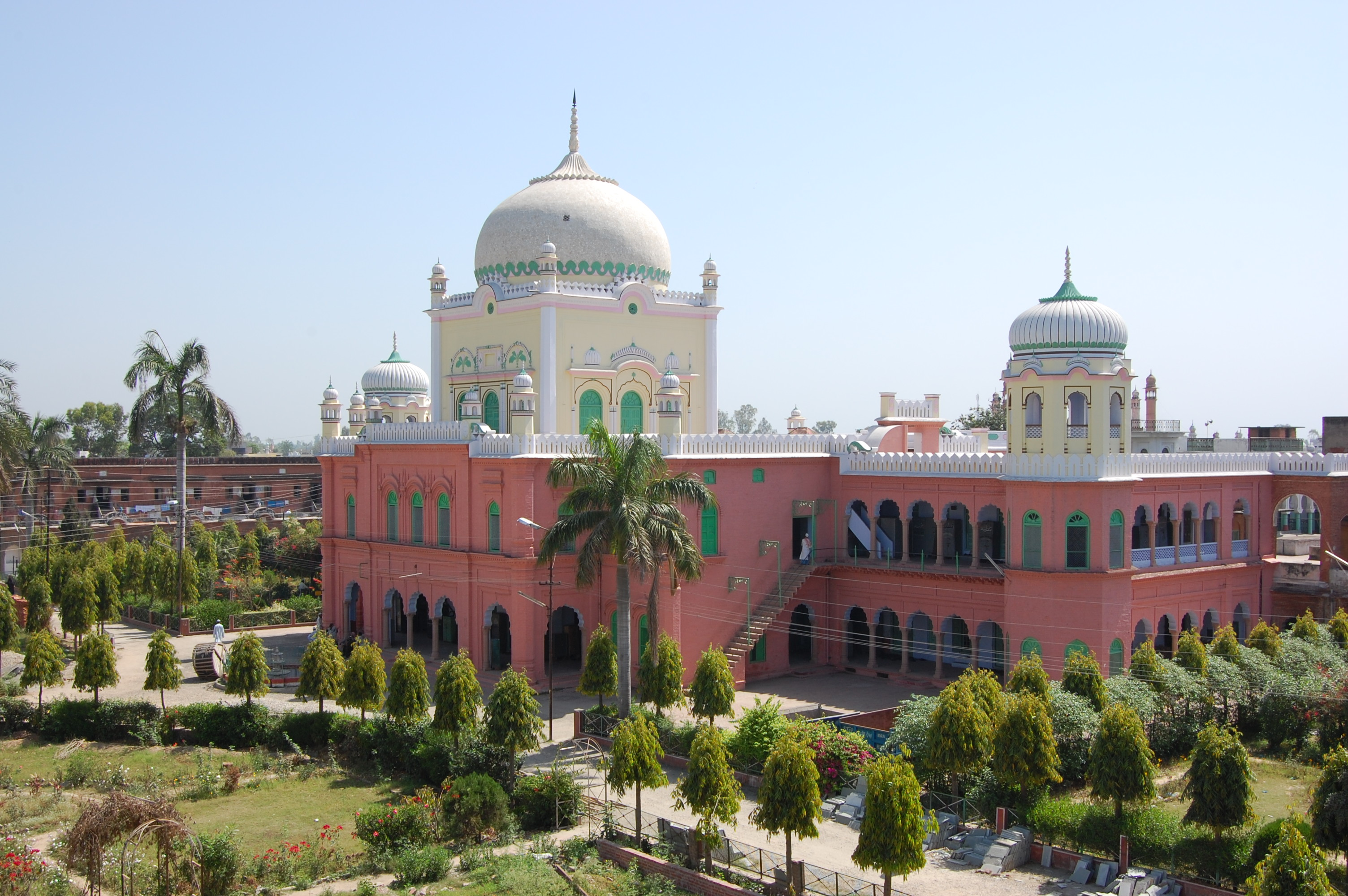
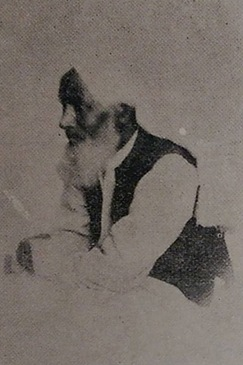
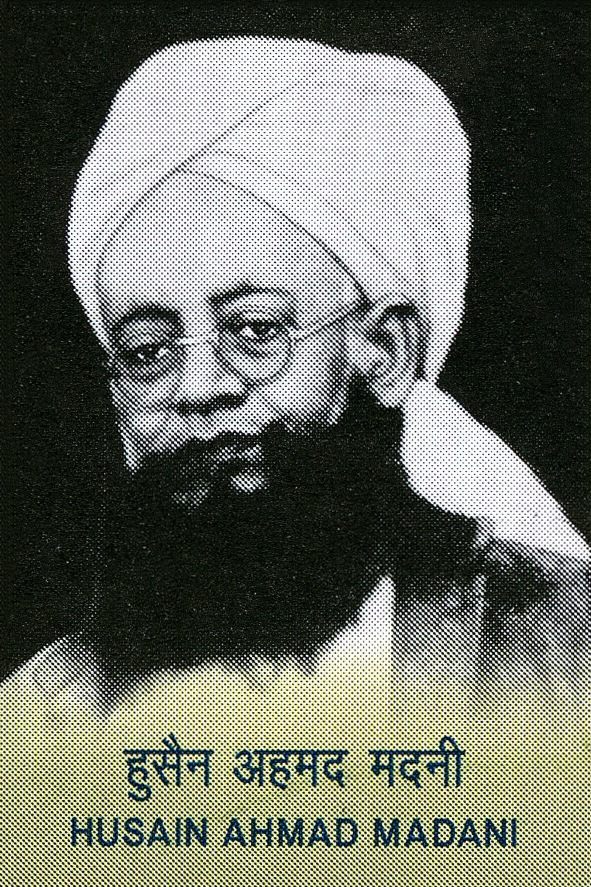
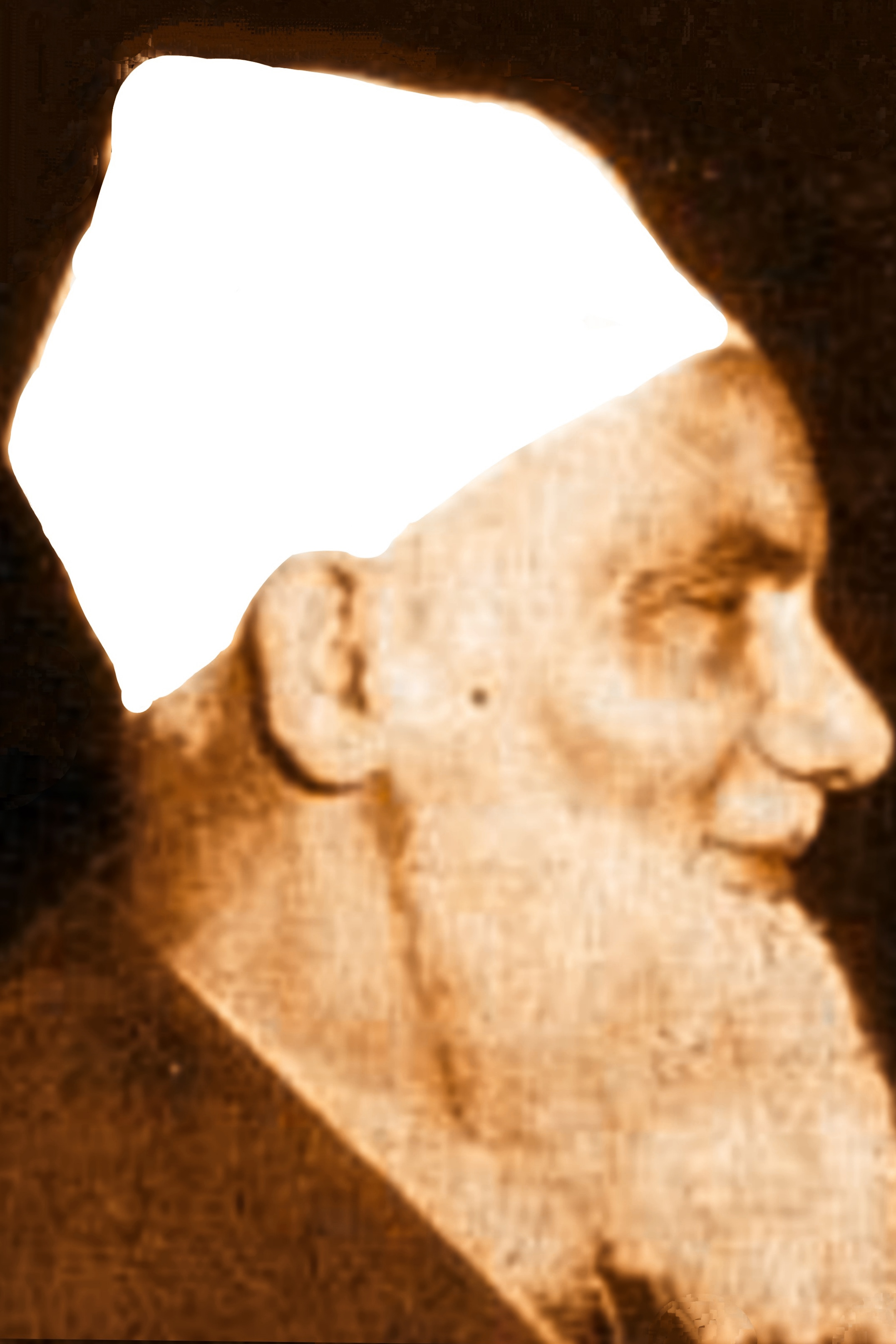
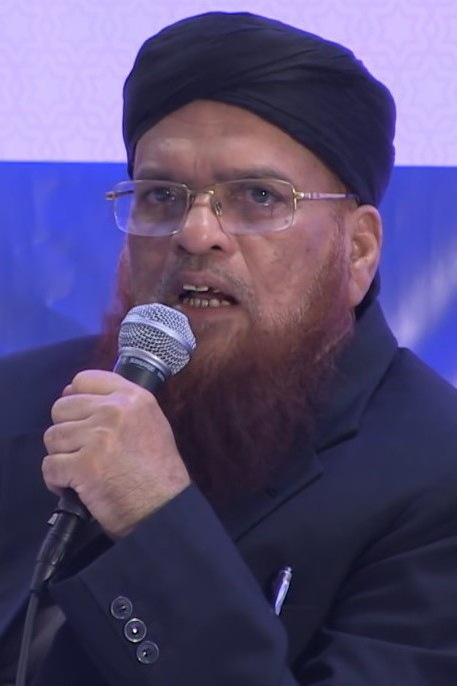
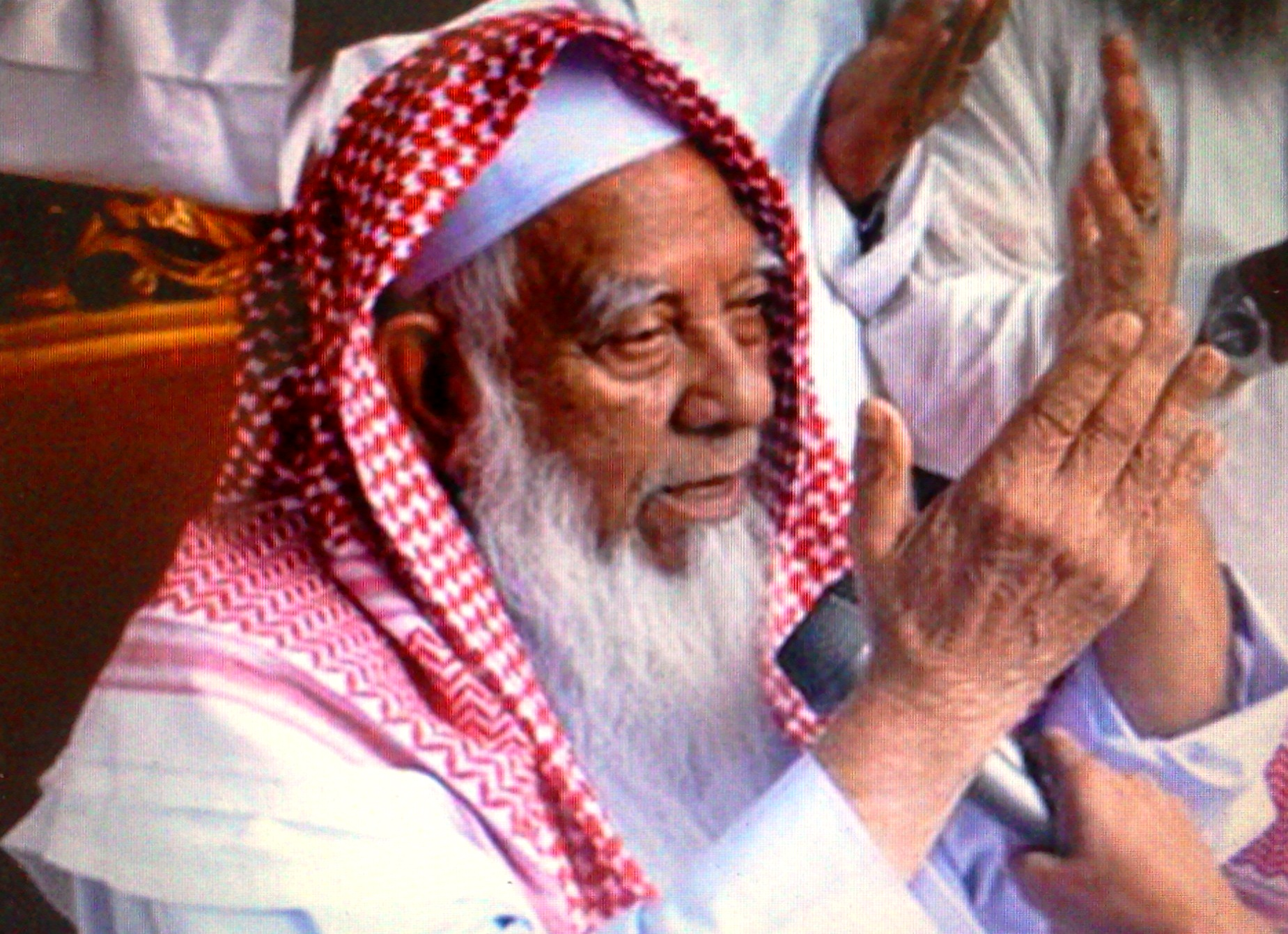
- Clockwise from top: Darul Uloom Deoband, Hussain Ahmad Madani, Taqi Usmani, Shah Ahmad Shafi, Shabbir Ahmad Usmani, Mahmud Hasan Deobandi

Deobandis represent a group of scholars affiliated with the reformist Deobandi movement, which originated in the town of Darul Uloom Deoband in northern India. Founded in 1866, this movement sought to safeguard Islamic teachings amidst non-Muslim governance and societal changes. Emphasizing strict adherence to Islamic law and traditional scholarship, particularly in areas like hadith and fiqh, Deobandīs have established a global network of schools, primarily concentrated in South Asia. Their influential roles encompass teaching, imamship, mosque guardianship, preaching, writing, engaging in debates, and publishing religious literature, with Muhammad Qasim Nanotvi, Rashid Ahmad Gangohi and Ashraf Ali Thanvi being their most celebrated scholars.

== A ==
1. Abdul Hai Hasani
2. Abdul Hameed Nomani
3. Abdul Aleem Farooqui
4. Abdul Ali Deobandi
5. Abdul Aziz Malazada
6. Abdul Bari Firangi Mahali
7. Abdul Batin Nomani
8. Abdul Ghaffar Mauvi
9. Abdul Haq Akorwi
10. Abdul Haq Azmi
11. Abdur Rashid
12. Abdul Rasheed Nomani
13. Abdul Shakoor
14. Abdul Sattar
15. Abdul Wasey
16. Abdullah Abbas Nadwi
17. Abdullah Darkhawasti
18. Abdullah Hasani Nadwi
19. Abdullah Maroofi
20. Abdul Hai Arifi
21. Abdul Khaliq Madrasi
22. Abdul Wahid Bengali
23. Abdul Halim Bukhari
24. Abdul Ghani Azhari
25. Abdul Aziz
26. Anas Haqqani
27. Abdulaziz Haqqani
28. Abdul Haleem Chishti
29. Abdul Jalil Choudhury
30. Abdul Majid Daryabadi
31. Abdul Matin Chowdhury
32. Abdul Rashid Ghazi
33. Abdul Ghafoor Haideri
34. Abdul Malek Halim
35. Abdul Salam Hanafi
36. Abdolhamid Ismaeelzahi
37. Abdul Bari Nadvi
38. Abdul Hameed Swati
39. Abdul Hamid Madarshahi
40. Abdul Jabbar Jahanabadi
41. Abdul Khaliq Sambhali
42. Abdul Majeed Ludhianvi
43. Abdul Momin Imambari
44. Abdul Qadir Raipuri
45. Abdul Quddus
46. Abdul Rauf Azhar
47. Abdul Wahhab Pirji
48. Abdur Rahim Ajmal
49. Abdur Rahman ibn Yusuf Mangera
50. Abdur Razzaq Iskander
51. Abdur Rahman (scholar)
52. Abdul Rehman Katki
53. Abdus Salam Chatgami
54. Abrarul Haq Haqqi
55. Abu Taher Misbah
56. Abu Taher Nadwi
57. Abu Yusuf Riyadh ul Haq
58. Abul Hasan Ali Hasani Nadwi
59. Abul Hasan Jashori
60. Abul Kalam Qasmi Shamsi
61. Abul Muhasin Muhammad Sajjad
62. Ahmad Hasan Amrohi
63. Ahmad Saeed Dehlavi
64. Ahmed Ali Badarpuri
65. Akram Toofani
66. Anas Madani
67. Anwar Shah Kashmiri
68. Anwar-ul-Haq Haqqani
69. Ahmad Ali Saharanpuri
70. Anzar Shah Kashmiri
71. Arif Jameel Mubarakpuri
72. Asghar Hussain Deobandi
73. Ashiq Ilahi Bulandshahri
74. Azhar Shah Qaiser
75. Athar Ali Bengali
76. Ashraf Ali Bishwanathi
77. Aziz-ul-Rahman Usmani
78. Azizul Haq
79. Azizul Haque
80. Aziz Ur Rahman Hazarvi
81. A F M Khalid Hossain
82. Asrarul Haq Qasmi
83. Agha Muhammad
84. Ahmad Laat
85. Ahmad Naruyi
86. Ahmed Ali Lahori
87. Ahmed Khanpuri
88. Allah Wasaya
89. Amanat Shah Haqqani
90. Ameer Zaman
91. Amjad M. Mohammed
92. Arshad Madani
93. Asad Madani
94. Asjad Madani
95. Ashraf Ali Dharnondoli
96. Ashraf Ali Thanwi
97. Asmatullah
98. Atta-ur-Rehman
99. Aurangzaib Farooqi
100. Azam Tariq
101. Azizur Rahman Bijnori

== B ==
1. Badre Alam Merathi
2. Badruddin Ajmal
3. Bilal Abdul Hai Hasani Nadwi
4. Burhanuddin Qasmi

== C ==
1. Cassim Sema
2. Chaudhry Abid Raza

== D ==
1. Deen Muhammad Khan

== E ==
1. Ebrahim Desai
2. Ehtisham ul Haq Thanvi

== F ==
1. Faizul Waheed
2. Farid Uddin Masood
3. Fateh Muhammad Panipati
4. Fayez Ullah
5. Fazal Ali Haqqani
6. Fazal-ur-Rehman
7. Fazli Ghafoor
8. Fazlul Haque Amini
9. Fazlur Rahman Usmani
10. Fida-Ur-Rehman Darkhawasti
11. Fuzail Ahmad Nasiri
12. Fazl-ur-Raheem Ashrafi

== G ==
1. Ghulam Mohammad Sadiq
2. Ghulam Muhammad Din Puri
3. Ghulam Mohammad Vastanvi
4. Ghulam Nabi Kashmiri
5. Ghulam Rasool Hazarvi
6. Ghulam Ullah Khan
7. Gulab Khan

== H ==
1. Habib al-Rahman al-A'zami
2. Hafez Ahmadullah
3. Habib-ur-Rehman Ludhianvi
4. Habibur Rahman Azami
5. Hibatullah Akhundzada
6. Habibullah Mukhtar
7. Habibullah Qurayshi
8. Habibur Rahman Usmani
9. Habibur Rahman Khairabadi
10. Hafiz Assamuddin
11. Hafiz Hamdullah
12. Hafiz Muhammad Ahmad
13. Hafiz Patel
14. Hafizur Rahman Wasif Dehlavi
15. Haji Abdul Malik Kakar
16. Haji Yunus
17. Hakeem Muhammad Akhtar
18. Hamid Ul Haq Haqqani
19. Hamid al-Ansari Ghazi
20. Haq Nawaz Jhangvi
21. Harun Babunagari
22. Harun Islamabadi
23. Hasan Jan
24. Hifzur Rahman Seoharwi
25. Hussain Ahmad Madani
26. Hussain Umarji

== I ==
1. Ibrahim Ali Tashna
2. Ibrahim Balyawi
3. Ibrahim Chatuli
4. Ibrahim Mogra
5. Ibrahim Ujani
6. Ibrar Sultan
7. Iftikhar-ul-Hasan Kandhlawi
8. Ijteba Nadwi
9. Ilyas Kandhlawi
10. Ilyas Ghuman
11. Imamuddin Punjabi
12. Imdadullah Muhajir Makki
13. Inamul Hasan Kandhlawi
14. Isar-ul-Haq Qasmi
15. Ishaq Faridi
16. Ishaq Sambhali
17. Ismail Ahmed Cachalia
18. Ishtiaque Ahmad Qasmi
19. Izaz Ali Amrohi
20. Izharul Islam Chowdhury

== J ==
1. Jalaluddin Haqqani
2. Jamaat Ansarullah
3. Jamir Uddin Nanupuri
4. Jasimuddin Rahmani
5. John Mohammed Butt
6. Juma Khan
7. Junaid Babunagari

== K ==
1. Kafeel Ahmad Qasmi
2. Kaleem Siddiqui
3. Khair Muhammad Jalandhari
4. Khalid Hafiz
5. Khalid Hussain Qasmi
6. Khalid Mehmood Soomro
7. Khalid Saifullah Rahmani
8. Khalil Ahmad Saharanpuri
9. Khalil Haqqani
10. Khawaja Khan Muhammad
11. Kifayatullah Dehlawi

== M ==
1. Mahdi Hasan Shahjahanpuri
2. Mahfoozur Rahman Nami
3. Mahfuzul Haque
4. Mahmood Ahmed Ghazi
5. Mahmood Ashraf Usmani
6. Mahmood Madani
7. Mahmud Deobandi
8. Mahmud Hasan Deobandi
9. Mahtab Ali Deobandi
10. Muhammad Yusuf Taulawi
11. Mahmudul Hasan
12. Majid Ali Jaunpuri
13. Malik Ishaq
14. Mamunul Haque
15. Manazir Ahsan Gilani
16. Manzoor Ahmad Chinioti
17. Manzoor Mengal
18. Manzoor Nomani
19. Maqsudullah
20. Marghubur Rahman
21. Masihullah Khan
22. Masood Azhar
23. Masroor Nawaz Jhangvi
24. Matinul Haq Usama Qasmi
25. Mazaullah Musakhail
26. Mazhar Nanautawi
27. Masood Madani
28. Mehdi Hasan Aini Qasmi
29. Minnatullah Rahmani
30. Mizanur Rahman Sayed
31. Moavia Azam Tariq
32. Mohammad Merajuddin
33. Mohammad Mujahid Khan Al Hussaini
34. Molana Fazal-ur-Rehman
35. Mohammad Najeeb Qasmi
36. Moinuddin Ruhi
37. Mufti Abdul Razzaq
38. Mufti Mehmood
39. Mufti Muhammad Naeem
40. Muhammad Abdul Wahhab
41. Muhammad Abdullah Ghazi
42. Muhammad Adil Khan
43. Muhammad Ahmed Ludhianvi
44. Muhammad Ali Jalandhari
45. Muhammad Ali Mungeri
46. Muhammad Amir Bijligar
47. Muhammad Azam Nadwi
48. Muhammad Azhar Nomani
49. Muhammad Faizullah
50. Muhammad Gohar Shah
51. Muhammad Hanif Jalandhari
52. Muhammad Hassan
53. Muhammad Ibrahim Mir Sialkoti
54. Muhammad Idris Kandhlawi
55. Muhammad Ishaq
56. Muhammad Ilyas Ghuman
57. Muhammad Ismail Katki
58. Muhammad Jabir Qasmi
59. Muhammad Jamal ud Din
60. Muhammad Khan Sherani
61. Muhammad Mian Mansoor Ansari
62. Muhammad Miyan Deobandi
63. Muhammad Musa Ruhani Bazi
64. Muhammad Mustafa Azmi
65. Muhammad Qasim Nanautavi
66. Rafi Usmani
67. Muhammad Saad Kandhlawi
68. Muhammad Saeed Khan
69. Muhammad Sahool Bhagalpuri
70. Muhammad Salim Qasmi
71. Muhammad Sarfaraz Khan Safdar
72. Muhammad Shafi
73. Muhammad Shoaib Khan Afridi
74. Muhammad Sufyan Qasmi
75. Muhammad Taqi Amini
76. Muhammad Tayyib Qasmi
77. Muhammad Umar Palanpuri
78. Muhammad Yunus
79. Muhammad Yunus Jaunpuri
80. Muhammad Yousuf
81. Muhammad Yusuf Taulawi
82. Muhammadullah Khalili Qasmi
83. Muhammadullah Hafezzi
84. Muhibbullah Babunagari
85. Muhiuddin Khan
86. Mujahidul Islam Qasmi
87. Mullah Omar
88. Munir Shakir
89. Murtaza Hasan Chandpuri
90. Mushahid Ahmad Bayampuri
91. Muzammil Hussain Kapadia

== N ==
1. Nadeem al-Wajidi
2. Najib Ali Choudhury
3. Naseer Ahmad Khan (scholar)
4. Nasiruddin Khakwani
5. Nazar-ur-Rehman
6. Nazir Ahmad Qasmi
7. Nematullah Azami
8. Nizamuddin Asir Adrawi
9. Nizamuddin Shamzai
10. Noman Naeem
11. Noor Alam Khalil Amini
12. Noor Muhammad
13. Nur Hossain Kasemi
14. Nur Uddin Gohorpuri
15. Nurul Islam Jihadi
16. Nurul Islam Olipuri

== O ==
1. Obaidul Haque
2. Obaidullah Hamzah
3. Oliur Rahman

== Q ==
1. Qamar ud Din
2. Qamaruzzaman Allahabadi
3. Qamruddin Ahmad Gorakhpuri
4. Qazi Athar Mubarakpuri
5. Qari Fayyaz-ur-Rehman Alvi
6. Qazi Hamidullah Khan
7. Qari Ismail
8. Qazi Mu'tasim Billah

== R ==
1. Rabey Hasani Nadwi
2. Rafiq Ahmad Pampori
3. Rafiuddin Deobandi
4. Rahmatullah Kairanawi
5. Rahmatullah Mir Qasmi
6. Rahmatullah Safi
7. Rashid Ahmad Gangohi
8. Rashid Ahmed Ludhianvi
9. Rehmat Khaliq
10. Riaz Basra
11. Ruhul Amin

== S ==
1. Saeed Ahmad Akbarabadi
2. Saeed Ahmad Palanpuri
3. Saeed Ahmad Sandwipi
4. Saeed-ur-Rahman Azmi Nadvi
5. Sana Ullah
6. Shafiqur Rahman Nadwi
7. Said Janan
8. Sajidur Rahman
9. Sajjad Afghani
10. Sajjad Nomani
11. Saleemullah Khan
12. Salman Mazahiri
13. Salman Nadwi
14. Salman Mansoorpuri
15. Salman Bijnori
16. Sameeruddin Qasmi
17. Sami-ul-Haq
18. Sanaullah Amritsari
19. Sardar Ali Haqqani
20. Sayed Nafees al-Hussaini
21. Sayyid Muhammad Abid
22. Sayyid Mumtaz Ali
23. Shabbir Ahmad Usmani
24. Shah Abdul Aziz
25. Shah Abdul Wahhab
26. Shah Ahmad Hasan
27. Shah Ahmad Shafi
28. Shah Saeed Ahmed Raipuri
29. Shahabuddin Popalzai
30. Shahidul Islam
31. Shaikh Idrees
32. Shams-ud-din Harifal
33. Shamsuddin Qasemi
34. Shamsul Haq Afghani
35. Shamsul Haque Faridpuri
36. Sharif Hasan Deobandi
37. Sheikh Rahimullah Haqqani
38. Shibli Nomani
39. Shihabuddin Nadvi
40. Shukrullah Mubarakpuri
41. Siddique Ahmad
42. Sirajussajidin Katki
43. Sirajuddin Haqqani
44. Sufi Azizur Rahman
45. Sulaiman Nadvi
46. Sultan Ahmad Nanupuri
47. Sultan Zauq Nadvi
48. Syed Abuzar Bukhari
49. Syed Adnan Kakakhail
50. Syed Ahmad Hashmi
51. Syed Ahmad Barelvi
52. Syed Ahmad Dehlavi
53. Syed Ata Ullah Shah Bukhari
54. Syed Ata-ul-Mohsin Bukhari
55. Syed Ata-ul-Muhaimin Bukhari
56. Syed Ehtisham Ahmed Nadvi
57. Syed Faizul Karim
58. Syed Fakhruddin Ahmad
59. Syed Fazlul Karim
60. Syed Mahmood Mian
61. Syed Mehboob Rizwi
62. Syed Muhammad Ishaq
63. Syed Mukhtaruddin Shah
64. Syed Nasib Ali Shah
65. Syed Noor ul Hassan Bukhari
66. Syed Rezaul Karim
67. Syed Sher Ali Shah
68. Shah Muhammad Nazrul Islam

== T ==
1. Taha Karaan
2. Tahir Mehmood Ashrafi
3. Tahir Hussain Gayavi
4. Tahir Panjpiri
5. Tajul Islam
6. Tariq Masood
7. Tariq Masood Arain
8. Tanveer-ul-Haq Thanvi
9. Taqi Usmani
10. Tariq Jamil

== U ==
1. Ubaidul Haq
2. Ubaidullah Anwar
3. Ubaidullah Sindhi
4. Usman Mansoorpuri
5. Usman Ghani Qasmi
6. Uzair Gul Peshawari

== W ==
1. Wahiduzzaman Kairanawi
2. Wali Hasan Tonki
3. Wali Rahmani
4. Wali-ur-Rehman
5. Wasiullah Fatehpuri
6. Wazeh Rashid Hasani Nadwi

== Y ==
1. Yahya Alampuri
2. Yaqub Nanautawi
3. Yasir Nadeem al Wajidi
4. Yusuf Kandhlawi
5. Yunus Jaunpuri
6. Yusuf Karaan
7. Yusuf Ludhianvi

== Z ==
1. Zafar Ahmad Usmani
2. Zafeeruddin Miftahi
3. Zahid Hasan (scholar)
4. Zakariyya Kandhlawi
5. Zar Wali Khan
6. Zayn al-Abidin Sajjad Meerthi
7. Zainul Abideen Azmi
8. Zia Uddin
9. Zulfiqar Ahmad Naqshbandi
10. Zulfiqar Ali Deobandi
11. Zamiruddin Ahmad

== See also ==
- Index of Deobandi movement–related articles
