= Nadvi =

Nadvi, signifying association with the Darul Uloom Nadwatul Ulama in India, may refer to one of the following:

- Abdul Bari Nadvi, Indian Muslim scholar
- Abdullah Abbas Nadwi, Indian Islamic scholar
- Mohammad Akram Nadwi, Indian Islamic scholar
- Rabey Hasani Nadvi, Indian Islamic scholar, president of All India Muslim Personal Law Board
- Saeed-ur-Rahman Azmi Nadvi, Indian Islamic scholar, principal of Darul Uloom Nadwatul Ulama
- Syed Abul Hasan Ali Hasani Nadwi Indian Islamic scholar
- Syed Ehtisham Ahmed Nadvi, Indian Islamic scholar
- Syed Sulaiman Nadvi, Indian and Pakistani historian
- Shihabuddin Nadvi, Indian Muslim scholar

== See also ==
- Nadwi, alternative transcription
