= Akram Toofani =

Pakistani Islamic scholar (1930–2021)

Maulana Muhammad Akram Toofani
- مولانا محمد اکرم طوفانی
- Akram Toofani in 2014

Personal life
- Born: 1930
- Died: 26 December 2021 (aged 90–91)
- Cause of death: heart attack
- Education: Jamia Ashrafia

Religious life
- Religion: Islam
- Denomination: Sunni
- Founder of: Khatam un Nabiyeen Medical Complex & Heart Center in Sargodha
- Movement: Aalmi Majlis Tahaffuz Khatm-e-Nubuwwat
- Profession: Islamic scholar

Muslim leader
- Teacher: Ahmad Ali Lahori; Syed Ata Ullah Shah Bukhari; Shamsul Haq Afghani; Maulana Rasool Khan; Ghulam Ghaus Hazarvi; Maulana Muhammad Abdullah Bahlavi; Khawaja Khan Muhammad

Akram Toofani (1930 - 26 December 2021 (Urdu: مولانا محمد اکرم طوفانی)) was a Pakistani Islamic scholar and one of the central leaders of the Aalmi Majlis Tahaffuz Khatm-e-Nubuwwat. He was an alumnus of Jamia Ashrafia. He was a Khatib in a local mosque in Sargodha. He established Khatam un Nabiyeen Medical Complex & Heart Center in Sargodha. Toofani died of a heart attack on 26 December 2021.

== Education and career ==
He started his religious education from Jamia Ashrafia Lahore and completed Dars-i Nizami and in 1964 he completed Hadith studies. After graduating he visited Sargodha and started preaching in a local mosque.

Among the scholars from whom he benefited Ahmad Ali Lahori, Syed Ata Ullah Shah Bukhari, Shamsul Haq Afghani, Maulana Rasool Khan, Ghulam Ghaus Hazarvi, Maulana Muhammad Abdullah Bahlavi and Khawaja Khan Muhammad are very prominent.

He traveled to many countries for da'wah and preaching and also authored many books. In 1958 in Multan he was blessed to serve Syed Ata Ullah Shah Bukhari. He also had correspondence with Hussain Ahmad Madani.

== Khatam un Nabiyeen Medical Complex & Heart Center ==
He established the Khatam-ul-Nabyeen Medical Complex and Heart Center in Sargodha. The hospital has medical facilities such as angiography, angioplasty, echography, ventilator, ECG, and ambulance.

== Death ==
He died of a heart attack on 26 December 2021. Maulana Fazl-ur-Rehman and others have expresses regret over his death.

== See also ==
- List of Deobandis
