= Nadwi =

Nadwi is title held by Islamic scholars who attended Darul Uloom Nadwatul Ulama. It may refer to one of the following:

- Abul Hasan Ali Hasani Nadwi, Indian Islamic scholar and author
- Abdul Bari Nadvi, Firangi Mahal Indian Islamic scholar
- Abdullah Abbas Nadwi, Indian Islamic scholar
- Ijteba Nadwi, Indian Muslim scholar
- Mohammad Akram Nadwi, Indian Islamic scholar
- Rabey Hasani Nadwi, Indian scholar
- Salman Nadwi, Indian scholar and professor in the Islamic sciences
- Shihabuddin Nadvi, Indian Islamic philosopher, religious reformer and writer
- Sulaiman Nadvi, Pakistani historian, writer and scholar of Islam
- Syed Ehtisham Ahmed Nadvi, Indian scholar of Arabic language and Islamic studies

== See also ==
- Nadvi, alternative transcription
