= Nadwa =

Nadwa ('forum') may refer to:

- Al Nadwa, a daily newspaper in Mecca, Saudi Arabia, 1958–2013
- Darul Uloom Nadwatul Ulama, an Islamic seminary in Lucknow, India

== See also ==
- Nadwan, Patna, India
- Nadwasarai, a village in Mau district, Uttar Pradesh, India
- Nadwi (disambiguation)
- Nadvi
