= Sufi Muhammad Sarwar =

Pakistani Islamic scholar

Personal life
- Born: 7 December 1933 Dera Ghazi Khan District, British India (now Pakistan)
- Died: 15 May 2018 (aged 84) Lahore, Punjab, Pakistan
- Children: 3 sons, 3 daughters
- Main interest: Hadith studies
- Notable work: Al-Khair al-Jari in Sahih al-Bukhari
- Education: Jamia Khair al-Madaris, Jamia Ashrafia
- Occupation: Islamic scholar, author, Sheikh al-Hadith

Religious life
- Religion: Islam
- Denomination: Sunni

Sufi Muhammad Sarwar ((Urdu: مولانا صوفی محمد سرور) 7 December 1933 – 15 May 2018) was a Pakistani Islamic scholar, author and Sheikh al-Hadith at Jamia Ashrafia. He studied at Jamia Khair al-Madaris and Jamia Ashrafia.

== Early life and education ==
Sarwar was born on 7 December 1933 in Dera Ghazi Khan district. After 10th grade, he started his religious education from Jamia Ashrafia founder Mufti Muhammad Hasan. And then studied religious books in Jamia Khair Madaris Multan of Khair Muhammad Jalandhri. Then he enrolled in the course of Hadith in Jamia Ashrafia Lahore and graduated successfully. After which he studied for some time in Karachi under Grand Mufti of Pakistan Mufti Muhammad Shafi.

After graduating from Aalimiyyat, he spent three years at Jamia Khair al-Madaris Multan and ten years at Darul Uloom Eidgah Kabirwala, taught books on Hadith and other sciences and arts in Jamia Ashrafia Lahore. He started the famous book Abu Dawud then Bukhari Sharif, while he taught Ashraf Ali Thanvi's Malfuzat every day after Asr prayer till his death.

== Literary works ==
He is the author of several books. including;

- Al-Khair al-Jari in Sahih al-Bukhari (2001)
- Ilm-o-Amal (Science and practice)

== Death ==
He died on 15 May 2018 in Lahore after a brief illness and was buried in Sher Shah Cemetery Lahore.

Then Punjab Chief Minister Shahbaz Sharif, Jamiat Ulema-e-Islam Central Emir Maulana Fazlur Rehman, JUI Secretary General Abdul Ghafoor Haidari, JUI Deputy Secretary General Maulana Muhammad Amjad Khan, Federal Minister Akram Khan Durrani, Maulana Ataur Rahman, Hafiz Hussain Ahmed, Muhammad Aslam Ghori and others have mourned over his death and said that Maulana Sufi Muhammad Sarwar's religious, teaching and social services will be remembered for a long time.
