= Abdul Hameed Swati =

Pakistani Islamic scholar (1917–2008)

Sheikh al-Hadith Abdul Hameed Khan Swati
- صوفی عبد الحمید خان سواتی

Personal life
- Born: 1917 Mansehra District
- Died: 6 April 2008 (aged 90–91)
- Cause of death: Gujranwala
- Resting place: Cemetery Kalan Gujranwala
- Children: Muhammad Fayyaz Khan Swati
- Main interest: Hadith
- Education: Darul Uloom Deoband; Government Nizamia Tibbi College; Darul Muballigheen Lucknow
- Relatives: Muhammad Sarfaraz Khan Safdar (brother); Zahid Ur Rashdi (nephew)

Religious life
- Religion: Islam
- Denomination: Sunni
- Institute: Jamia Nusrat Ul Uloom Gujranwala
- Founder of: Jamia Nusrat Ul Uloom Gujranwala
- Profession: Islamic Scholar, writer

Muslim leader
- Teacher: Hussain Ahmad Madani; Abdul Shakoor Lakhnavi
- Successor: Muhammad Fayyaz Khan Swati

Abdul Hameed Khan Swati (1917 – 6 April 2008) (Urdu: مولانا صوفی عبد الحمید خان سواتی) was a Pakistani Islamic scholar and Imam, who was the lecturer and founder of Jamia Nusrat Ul Uloom Gujranwala.

He was the younger brother of Muhammad Sarfaraz Khan Safdar and uncle of Zahid Khan.

== Early life and education ==
Swati was born in 1917 to Noor Ahmad Khan in Cheeran Dhaki on the top of the hill of Kurmang Bala, a few miles from Shinkiari, Mansehra District. His mother died in his infancy. Sometime later, his father also died and he along with his brother Muhammad Sarfaraz Khan Safdar continued to study together at various madrassas in Buffa, Malikpur, Khakho, Lahore, Wadala Sindhwan, Jahanian Mandi, Gujranwala and other places and then reached Darul Uloom Deoband in 1941 where they benefited from the Hussain Ahmad Madani and others. Swati also studied at the Government Nizamia Tibbi College and Darul Muballigheen Lucknow with Abdul Shakoor Lakhnavi.

== Career ==
After graduation he returned to Gujranwala where he performed religious services in some mosques of Khayali and Krishna Nagar (Faisalabad neighborhood) for some time and started a clinic in Chowk Niain. In 1952, on the advice of his teacher, Abdul Wahid, and other scholars, he began construction of a religious seminary Madrasa Nusratul Uloom and a mosque Jamia Masjid Noor. He had the patronage of Ahmad Ali Lahori, Abdullah Darkhawasti and Abdul Wahid and the companionship of his brother Muhammad Sarfaraz Khan Safdar.

== Literary works ==
Swati wrote several books, Including;

- Maalim ul Irfan fi Daroos ul Quran
- Khutbat-i-Swati
- Maqalat-i-Swati
- Aun Al Khabir

== Death and legacy ==
On 5 April 2008 Swati died and was buried in Kalan Gujranwala Cemetery. He left behind three sons, his successor Haji Muhammad Fayyaz Khan Swati, Muhammad Riaz Khan Swati and Muhammad Arabaz Khan Swati.

== See more ==
- List of Deobandis
