= Abdullah Tabib =

Unani physician and writer

- عبدالله طبيب or عبدالله یزدی
- Born: Golconda Sultanate (present-day South India)
- Other names: Abdullah Yazdi, ʿAbdu'llāh Ṭabīb, ʿAbd Allāh Ṭabīb, ʿAbd Allāh Yazdī
- Occupation(s): Unani physician; writer
- Era: Mughal period (Golconda Sultanate)
- Notable work: Farid (also known as Tibb-i Faridi)

Abdullah Tabib, also known as Abdullah Yazdi, (Note: Other transliterations of the name include 'Abdu'llāh Ṭabīb, 'Abdu'llāh Yazdī, 'Abd Allāh Ṭabīb, and 'Abd Allāh Yazdī) was a Unani physician and writer from the Golconda Sultanate of present-day southern India. He is best known for writing the medical book Farid, also known as Tibb-i Faridi.

== Biography ==
Abdullah Tabib was a famous physician of Golconda. He lived during the reign of Muhammad Quli Qutb Shah (r. 1580–1612), to whom he dedicated his work Farid. The author calls himself "Abdullah Tabib" in the book's preface. The end of the book's Bodleian Library manuscript, in which two leaves were added much later, calls him Abdullah Yazdi. Another work, Subh-i Sadiq, dates Abdullah Yazdi to the same period, and describes him as an immigrant to India and a pupil of Khwaja Jamaluddin Mahmud Shirazi.

== Works ==
Abdullah Tabib's Farid (Note: Also known as Tibb-i-Farid, Tibbi-i Farid, Tibb Farid, or Tibb-i Faridi) is a work on medicine that discusses hygiene and treatment of diseases through proper food and simple drugs. For example, the author considers polygonum aviculare (anjabar or knot grass) as the best drug for treating hematuria. The introduction of the book discusses the essentials of health and its preservation. The book has a chapter dealing with common human diseases, and a conclusion divided into three parts. The author quotes from several earlier writers including Hippocrates, Plato, Masawaiyh, Abu Bakr al-Razi, and Ibn Zuhr. The manuscripts of Farid are available at Bodleian Library (possibly from late 17th century), Khuda Bakhsh Oriental Library (1763 CE), and the Nizamia Tibbi College Library.

The works attributed to Abdullah Yazdi include Hashiyah bar Mukhtasar Talkhis, Hashiyah bar Sharh-i Tajrid, and Hashiyah bar Tahzib.

According to Charles Ambrose Storey, a work titled Tibb i Faridi, attributed to Farid al-Din, may be same as Abdullah Tabib's Farid. It is known from a manuscript at the Government Oriental Manuscripts Library in Chennai, but does not contain any preface or colophon. It contains 368 chapters dealing with a particular disease and its treatment.
