= Fazalur Raheem Ashrafi =

Pakistani Islamic scholar (1944–2026)

Sheikh al-Hadīṯh Fazalur Raheem Ashrafi

Chancellor of Jamia Ashrafia
- In office 2016–2026

Patron of the Wifaq-ul-Madaris al-Arabia
- In office 1998–2026
- Preceded by: Muhammad Abdullah Ghazi

Chairman of Punjab Quran Board
- In office 2001–2018
- Preceded by: Hanif Jalandhari

Personal life
- Born: 10 November 1944 Amritsar, Punjab Province, British India
- Died: 4 January 2026 (aged 81) Lahore, Punjab, Pakistan
- Citizenship: British Indian (1944–1947); Pakistani (1947–2026)

Religious life
- Religion: Islam
- Denomination: Sunni
- Jurisprudence: Hanafi
- Movement: Deobandi

Fazlaur Rahim Ashrafi (Urdu: فضل الرحیم اشرفی; 10 November 1944 – 4 January 2026) was a Pakistani Islamic scholar, who served as the Chancellor of Jamia Ashrafia in Lahore and the Patron of the Wifaq-ul-Madaris al-Arabia educational board of Pakistan.

== Biography ==
Ashrafi was born in Amritsar, British India on 10 November 1944, to Mufti Muhammad Hassan. He was the son of Mufti Muhammad Hassan, the founder of Jamia Ashrafia, and the author of several religious books.

He served as the head of Jamia Ashrafia in Lahore from 2016. He was also the Chairman of the Quran Board of Government of Punjab, President of the International Federation of Islamic Literature of Pakistan, and Patron of the Wifaq-ul-Madaris al-Arabia since 17 October 1998.

Ashrafi died on 4 January 2026, at the age of 81. His funeral prayers took place in Lahore on 5 January.

== See also ==
- List of Deobandis
- Jamia Ashrafia
