= Khalid Mahmud =

Pakistani Sunni Islamic scholar (1925–2020)

Allāmah Khalid Maḥmūd
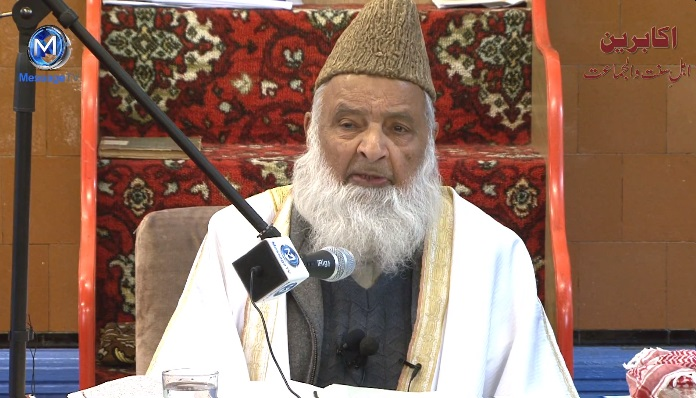

Personal life
- Born: 17 October 1925 Lahore, British India
- Died: 14 May 2020 (aged 94) Manchester, United Kingdom
- Notable work: Aasaar-ut-Tanzeel

Religious life
- Religion: Islam
- Denomination: Ahlus-Sunnah wa’l-Jama’ah
- Jurisprudence: Hanafi

Muslim leader
- Students: Harun Islamabadi

Dr Allama Khalid Maḥmūd (17 October 1925 – 14 May 2020) was a Pakistani Sunni Islamic scholar who served as a Justice of the Supreme Court of Pakistan. He established the Islamic Academy and City Jamia Masjid in Manchester, England, and was best known for his works related to the Finality of the Prophethood.

== Education ==
Maḥmūd studied Islamic Sciences from Zakariyya Kandhlawi, Shamsul Haq Afghani, Shabbir Ahmad Usmani, and Badre Alam Meerthi. He received his PhD degree in 1970 from the University of Birmingham. He also completed his master's degrees in Arabic, Persian, Philosophy & Theology, also achieving an LLB in Law.

== Career ==
He served as a senior Justice of the Supreme Court of Pakistan (Shariat Appellate Bench). He was also director of the Islamic Academy of Manchester UK. He founded a purpose-built mosque, Gity Jamia Masjid, in Manchester.

Mahmood was the Shaykh-ul-Hadith of Jamia Ashrafia, Lahore, and the head of the Islamic Center Manchester.

In the UK during the 1960s, he worked with Asif Husain Farooqi and Yusuf Motala and worked alongside him (before establishing Dar-ul-Uloom Bury).

He travelled to over 50 countries in his lifetime with regard to his Islamic works, focusing on establishing the message relating to the Finality of the Prophethood. Manzoor Ahmad Chinioti accompanied Mahmood on many of the travels relating to these works; most notably spending a 6-month period in South Africa in the 1970s whilst contention relating to Khatm-e-Nabuwwat was rife - soon after the opposing view began to be spread in these areas.

Throughout his lifetime, Mahmood established many Masājid and Islamic centres across the world, especially in poverty-stricken areas - for example within Ghana, Gambia, and many throughout South-East Asia, whilst also setting-up many other charities in these areas to provide aid in the form of orphanages, health centres, and food banks.

== Literary works ==
Mahmud wrote a detailed study on the Barelvi school of thought entitled, Mut̤ālaʻah-yi Brelvīyat : ek tārīk̲h̲ī, fikrī, aur taḥqīqī jāʼizah. He wrote his doctoral thesis comparing the attitudes of Muhammad al-Bukhari, Muhammad ibn Ya'qub al-Kulayni, and their co-religionists on the basic doctrines of Islam. His other books include:

- Ās̲ārulḥadīs̲
- Ās̲āruliḥsān fī sairissulūk val ʻirfān
- Ās̲āruttanzīl
- Dātā Ganj Bak̲h̲sh aur un kā ʻahd
- Faz̤āʼil-i ahl-i Bait Ṣaḥābah-i Kirām va tābiʻīn : Ṣaḥābah-i Karām, Ahl-i Bait
- Ḥaz̤rat Abū Bakr kā daur-i k̲h̲ilāfat
- The authenticity of Hadith

== Death ==
Khalid Maḥmūd died on 14 May 2020 in Manchester, United Kingdom.
