= Zahid Hasan =

Zahid Hasan may refer to:

- Zahid Hasan (actor) (born 1965), Bangladeshi actor
- Zahid Hasan (scholar) (1918–1988), Indian Islamic scholar and independence activist
