= Amjad M. Mohammed =

British Islamic scholar

- Title: Mufti, Qadi, Imam and Islamic scholar

Personal life
- Born: England
- Era: 21st-century philosophy
- Main interest(s): Quran, Shari'a, Hadith, Fiqh, Tafsir, Muslim minorities in the West, Fiqh al-Aqalliyat, Islamic finance, Usul al-Fiqh, Fatwa, Islamic ethics
- Notable idea(s): Western Muslim minority jurisprudence, Sharīʿa hermeneutics, Western Fiqh al-Nawazil, Fiqh of Moonsighting
- Education: JKN Institute Bradford; Bradford University
- Website: www.irtis.org.uk

Religious life
- Religion: Islam
- Denomination: Sunni Islam
- Jurisprudence: Hanafi
- Movement: Deobandi

Muslim leader
- Influenced by: Shaykh Mufti Saiful Islam, Grand Mufti Muhammad Shafi, Dr. Mawlana Muhammad Abdul Hai Arifi, Muhammad Masihullah Khan, Maulana Ashraf Ali Thanwi

Muftī Qāḍī Sayyid Amjad Mahmood Mohammed (Urdu: امجد محمود محمد is a British Islamic scholar who is dean and head scholar at the British Olive Foundation. He has written and lectured extensively on fiqh, Sharia, organ donation, moonsighting, jurisprudence for Muslim minorities in the West, Muslim education within the West, usul al-fiqh, and Islamic finance. He sits on multiple Sharia and fatwa boards, and holds advisory positions at several financial institutions pursuing Islamic banking or finance.

== RG Advisory ==
Mohammed is the Co-Founder & Chief Executive Officer of RG Advisory.

== NZF Worldwide ==
Mohammed is the Chief Shariah Officer of NZF Worldwide.

== Muslims in non-Muslim lands ==
Mohammed‘s main focus is on the concept of minority jurisprudence (fiqh al-aqalliyat) and tradition-based or Sharia hermeneutics. His book, Muslims in non-Muslim Lands: A Legal Study with Applications, explains how the British Muslim community developed its faith identity through three particular stances: assimilation, isolation and integration. The findings argue that the assumption that Islam causes Muslims to isolate from the indigenous population and form ‘a state within a state’ is false, and that Islamic law actually gives Muslims confidence and the ability to integrate within the wider society.

== Fatwa exposing OneCoin scheme ==
Cryptocurrency OneCoin is deemed one of the world’s biggest crypto-scams. OneCoin claimed to have a Shariah-compliant certificate about which Mufti Amjad Mohammed started to receive queries by uncertain Muslim investors. After careful inspection of the OneCoin terms and conditions, Mohammed issued a fatwa saying that Muslims should not invest in OneCoin. In response, OneCoin claimed they had changed their T&Cs, but he still advised against Muslims investing as OneCoin could not be found on any cryptocurrency exchanges.

== See more ==
- List of Deobandis
