= Shams-ud-din Harifal =

- Born: 4 May 1944; Zhob, Balochistan, Pakistan
- Died: 14 March 1974 (aged 29); Khulgai, Killa Saif ullah, Balochistan Pakistan
- Cause of death: assassination
- Resting place: Zhob
- Citizenship: Pakistani
- Education: Islamic Graduate
- Alma mater: Madrasa Arabia Makhzan-ul-uloom Rahim yar khan
- Occupation: Deputy Speaker of the Balochistan Assembly
- Years active: 1973
- Known for: Politics
- Title: Maulana
- Political party: Jamiat Ulema-e-Islam
- Parent: Muhammad Zahid Harifal

Shams-ud-din Harifal (Urdu: مولانا شمس الدین حریفال) was an (4 May 1944 - 14 March 1974) was an Islamic Sunni Hanafi scholar of the Deobandi school of thought and political leader of Jamiat Ulema-e-Islam and Tehreek-e-Khatme-e-Nubuwwat. According to his biographer, Shams-ud-din's major contribution was his support of strong anti-Ahmadiyya feelings among Muslims at the risk and sacrifice of his life.

== Early life and education ==
He was born on 4 May 1944 (21 Jumada al-awwal 1364 AH) in Balkh Province of Afghanistan to a family of religious scholars. His father Muhammad Zahid Harifal was a sufi theologian. He was the founder and teacher of the Madrasa Shams-uloom at Fort Sandeman in Zhob.

Shams-ud-din received elementary religious education from his father. He continued both secular schooling and religious education.

He matriculated from a government high school in Zhob in 1960. He then attended a madrassa boarding school in Akora Khattak, Khyber Pakhtoonkhwa. He stayed there for two years and continued his education under the guidance of Abdul Haq (father of Sami-ul-Haq, the chief of the JUI). He then attended the Madrasa Arabia New Town Karachi, where he studied under Muhammad Yousuf Binori for two consecutive years.

He then went to Khanpur, Rahim Yar Khan and studied at the Madrasa Arabia Makhzan-ul-uloom wa fayuz Eidgah, headed by Pakistani religious scholar Abdullah Darkhawasti. Realizing the highest spiritual position of his teacher, he immediately became his spiritual student by taking the Bay'ah (oath of allegiance) of the Naqshbandi order of Sufism.

After two years stay he proceeded to his last institution, the Madrasa Nasratul Uloom Gujranwala, to complete the remaining one-year course of Darse Nizami. At that madrasa, Shams-ud-din studied course of Hadiths (narrations of the words and deeds of Muhammad). He gained knowledge of tafseer, Hadith, spiritualism, mysticism, metaphysics, and logic. Thus completing a traditional Dars-i-Nizam course, he acquired his sanad (degree in Islamic knowledge and sciences of Hadith).

After completing his graduation he returned to his native city of Zhob, where his father advised him to engage in revitalizing his madrasa. He became the patron of Madrasa, Shams-ul-Uloom following his father's wishes.

== Ancestral background ==
Shams-ud-din belonged to the Harifal tribe. Shams-ud-din's forefather had been religious scholars for many generations. His first cousin, Obaid-ullah Khan Harifal, was the sardar (tribal chieftain) of the Harifal tribe. His grandfather, Muhammad Rafique, was a saint and had many disciples, as did his father. Another grandfather, Abdul Haq Harifal, had resisted British occupation, in present-day Shinghar.

== Political career ==
Shams-ud-din was a member of Tehreek-e-Khatme Nabuwwat, which demanded the government of Pakistan declare Ahmadis as non-Muslims.

During the general election of 1970, Shams-ud-din participated and contested the election at PB 10, Fort Sandeman (as Zhob was then known), on the platform of his political party Jamiat Ulema-e-Islam. He came in first in the election with 7,578 votes, more than double the total of the second-place finisher, Nawabzada Taimur Shah Jogezai, of the Muslim League (Qayyam), who received 3,726 Votes.

On 2 May 1972, chairman Abdul Samad Khan Achakzai opened the first session of the Provincial Assembly of Balochistan, in the town hall, Quetta. During this session, Nawab Muhammad Khan Barozai of the National Awami Party (NAP) was elected as Speaker of Assembly. The very next day, 3 May 1972, Shams-ud-din was unanimously elected Deputy Speaker. (Ataullah Mengal had already been elected on 1 May as chief Minister.)

It was a coalition government of NAP and JUI. Shams-ud-din was the youngest member of the assembly at age 28. Unfortunately, the assembly only lasted for ten months, before the Federal Government of Zulfiqar Ali Bhutto dismissed the Provincial Government of Balochistan on 13 February 1973.

=== Arrest ===
On 15 July 1973, Shams-ud-din held a rally in Zarif Sheed Park, Zhob. He delivered a speech against the dissemination of tampered Qurans and literature in his native city, allegedly by Ahmadis. Tampering news inflamed the emotions of the people, which lead to riots and lynchings.

Between 17 and 18 July 1973, Shams-ud-din's Zhob residence was cordoned off by a heavy contingent of Frontier Corps, who arrested him. The next morning, news of his arrest spread through the city, and tribesmen from all around blocked the outgoing roads to prevent him from being taken away. As the public protest grew out of control, authorities took him away by helicopter. This only further inflamed unrest all over the country.

Several days after Shams-ud-din's disappearance, Mufti Mehmood demanded on the floor of the National Assembly that his whereabouts be revealed, even if he were dead. On that demand the Interior Minister Abdul Qayyum Khan confessed that Shams-ud-din was alive and in custody at Ma-wand (Kohlu) District, Balochistan. His arrest was controversial throughout the province.

During his detention period, his father Muhammad Zahid Harifal received a message from then Governor Akbar Bugti, through his special emissary Saleh Muhammad, seeking a meeting at Quetta, so that the release of Shams-ud-din could be worked out. Muhammad Zahid declined to accede to this proposal.

A writ petition of habeas corpus was filed in Sindh-Balochistan High Court, Karachi, challenging his illegal confinement and petitioning for his release, on the premise that the prisoner had been detained incommunicado. Shams-ud-din was released on 18 August 1973. He received a grand reception when he returned to Zhob.

A couple of days after his release, he held a rally in Central Jama Mosque, Zhob, and expressed his determination to go ahead with his mission.

Meanwhile, his two colleagues, Saleh Muhammad Mardanzai of Muslim Bagh and Hassan Shah, who were elected on the JUI ticket, switched over to the ruling Pakistan People's party. Their actions conjured up illusions of victory in the minds of many hawkish politicians, who believed that Shams-ud-din would also switch parties. He was even offered the position of provincial Chief Minister as a reward, but refused.

== Death ==
In the first week of March 1974, Shams-ud-din left Zhob for Quetta, and along with Muhammad Zaman Khan Achakzai (Provincial General Secretary of the JUI) called on the governor of Balochistan, Khan of Kalat Mir Ahmed Yar Khan, and conveyed him the message of Darkhawasti, and reminded him his commitment for implementing Islamic laws. The governor replied positively, stating, "we seek your cooperation".

After his meeting with the governor, Shams-ud-din left Quetta for Khanpur, where he met with his mentor Darkhawasti, who prediction to Shams-ud-din, "it could be our last meeting". A few days prior, an attempt had been made on Darkhawasti's life at his official residence in Quetta and Darkhawasti was concerned.

On 10 March 1974, Shams-ud-din addressed his last gathering near the vegetable market in Rahimyarkhan, Punjab Pakistan. Later that same day he left for Sibi and stayed overnight.

On 13 March 1974, Shams-ud-din was driving home to Zhob along with one of his friends. On the way to Zhob, Shams-ud-din stopped in Akhterzai for his noon prayers. After prayers were over, Shams-ud-din resumed the drive. Thirty-five kilometers from Akhterzai, near a village called "Khulgai" (Killa Saifullah District), where his friend shot him thrice in the head from behind the driver's seat.

Later that same day, Malik Gul Hassan, who also happened to be on way to Zhob, saw an abandoned car on the side of the road and went to investigate. He found the body of Maulana Shams-ud-din, and the whole interior of car stained with blood. He turned back to Killa Saifullah and informed police and district authorities. It was learnt later that Shams-ud-din's friend had visited him at Quetta and stayed with him for three days before insisting on accompanying him to Zhob.

=== Aftermath ===
The next day, people took to the streets in Quetta, chanting slogans against his assassination. At Bacha Khan crossroads, police clashed with demonstrators, opening fire on the crowd, killing six and injuring more than one hundred people; however, the unrest didn't subside. His funeral prayer became a massive demonstration of popular acclaim.

The next day, 14 March 1974, he was laid to rest at Zhob graveyard. At 29 years old, Shams-ud-din was survived by his widow and a daughter, his parents, and his brothers.

== Legacy ==
Shams-ud-din's death created such a wave of sympathy that it left political repercussions in the province. North Balochistan is the current political heartland of Jamiat Ulema-e-Islam, who control not only large numbers of radical Madrassas, but a majority of the legislative seats at both the national and provincial level.

A main crossroads in Zhob was renamed "Maulana Shams-ud-din Shaheed Chowk" in 2012 by the people of Zhob.

Numerous legends and popular songs have grown around his personality. People still believe that on his burial there was a shower of petals, and his blood continued to ooze from his body 24 hours after his body, with a fragrant smell.

== See also ==
- List of Deobandis
