= Mohammad Mujahid Khan Al Hussaini =

Pakistani politician and islamic scholar

Maulana Mohammad Mujahid Khan Al Hussaini

Personal life
- Born: 8 December 1920 Nowshera
- Died: 7 November 2014 (aged 93)

Religious life
- Denomination: Sunni

Senior posting
- Teacher: Hussain Ahmad Madani

Member of Provincial Assembly of the Khyber Pakhtunkhwa
- In office 2002–2007
- Constituency: PK-14 (Nowshera-III)

Personal details
- Party: Jamiat Ulema-e-Islam (F)
- Education: Darul Uloom Deoband
- Occupation: Politician

Mohammad Mujahid Khan Al Hussaini was a Pakistani Islamic scholar and politician who served as Member of Provincial Assembly of the Khyber Pakhtunkhwa from 2002 to 2007.

== See also ==
- List of Deobandis
