= Hussain Umarji =

Indian Muslim cleric accused of conspiracy behind Godhra train burning

- Died: 13 January 2013; Godhra
- Other names: Maulavi Hussein, Maulvi Omerjee,
- Known for: Accused of masterminding the Godhra Train Burning which killed 59 Hindu pilgrims (Karsevaks) returning from Ayodhya.
- Spouse: Shabira
- Children: 4

Hussain Umarji was a cleric from the city of Godhra in the western Indian state of Gujarat accused of being the 'key conspirator' of a conspiracy which led to the arson of the Sabarmati Express at the Godhra railway station on 27 February 2002. He was later acquitted by the courts for lack of evidence.

== Personal life ==
A graduate from Darul Uloom Deoband, Hussain was a prominent leader of the Deobandi-Tableegh Jamaat movement in the Godhra region.

Hussain was a prosperous timber merchant married to Shabira and had six children, two daughters Fatima and Afsa, and four sons, two of whom are Amin and Saeed.

== See also ==
- List of Deobandis
