= Abdul Malik Kakar =

Pakistani politician

Member of the Provincial Assembly of Balochistan
- In office 29 May 2013 – 31 May 2018

Personal details
- Born: 6 July 1954 (age 71) Pishin District
- Party: Jamiat Ulema-e Islam (F)

Abdul Malik Kakar is a Pakistani politician who was a Member of the Provincial Assembly of Balochistan from May 2013 to May 2018.

== Early life ==
He was born on 6 July 1954 in Pishin District.

== Political career ==
He was elected to the Provincial Assembly of Balochistan as a candidate of Jamiat Ulema-e Islam (F) from Constituency PB-9-Pishin-II in the 2013 Pakistani general election. He received 15,818 votes and defeated an independent candidate, Asfand Yar Kakar.

== See also ==
- List of Deobandis
