= Mazaullah Musakhail =

Pakistani politician

Member of the Provincial Assembly of Balochistan
- In office 29 May 2013 – 31 May 2018

Personal details
- Born: 1 January 1954 (age 72) Musakhel District, Pakistan
- Party: Jamiat Ulema-e Islam (F)

Moulvi Mazaullah Musakhail is a Pakistani politician who was a Member of the Provincial Assembly of Balochistan from May 2013 to May 2018.

== Early life and education ==
He was born on 1 January 1954 in Musakhel District.

He has received Islamic education from Madrasa.

== Political career ==
He was elected to the Provincial Assembly of Balochistan as a candidate of Jamiat Ulema-e Islam (F) from Constituency PB-15 Musakhail in the 2013 Pakistani general election. He received 8,451 votes and defeated a candidate of Jamiat Ulama-e-Islam Nazryati.

== See also ==
- List of Deobandis
