= Jama Masjid, Nerul =

Mosque in Mumbai, Maharashtra, India

Jama Masjid
- जामा मशीद
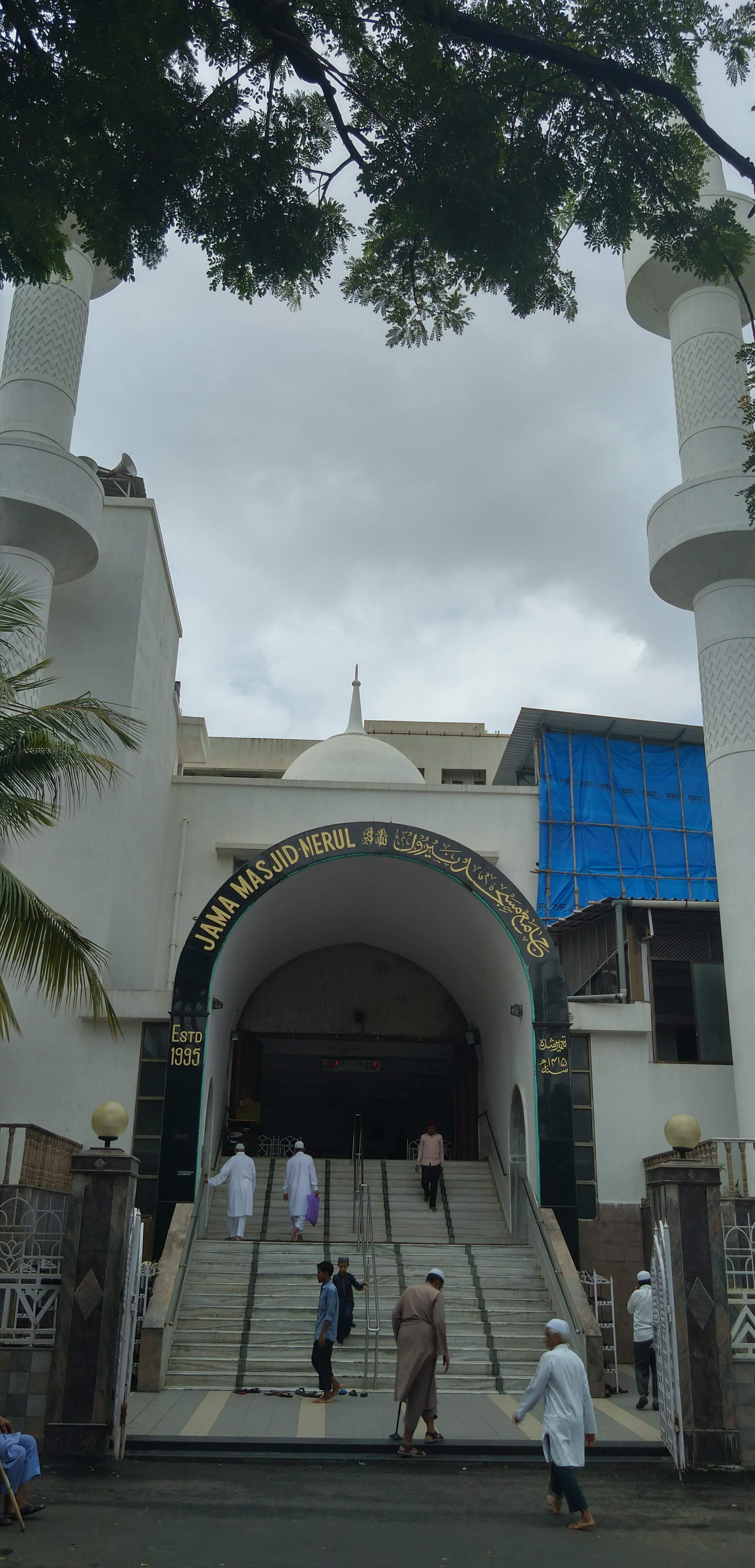
- The mosque in 2019

- Location in of the mosque in Mumbai

Religion
- Affiliation: Sunni Islam
- Rite: Tablighi Jamaat
- Ecclesiastical or organizational status: Friday mosque
- Leadership: Ahmed Laat; Ebrahim Dewla
- Status: Active

Location
- Location: East Nerul, Navi Mumbai, Maharashtra
- Country: India
- Interactive map of Jama Masjid
- Coordinates: 19°02′05″N 73°01′14″E

Architecture
- Type: Mosque architecture
- Style: Indo-Islamic
- Completed: 1995

Specifications
- Capacity: 2,000 worshippers
- Minaret: Two

Jama Masjid, also known as the Nerul Aalami Markaz and as the Masjid-E-Tabligh, is a Sunni Friday mosque, affiliated with the "shura" faction of the Tablighi Jamaat, located in East Nerul, in Navi Mumbai, in the state of Maharashtra, India. The mosque is the oldest and largest mosque in Nerul and one of the main mosques of Navi Mumbai.

The mosque serves as the headquarters for the shura faction of the Tablighi Jamaat and is led by scholars Ahmad Laat and Ebrahim Dewla.

== Architecture ==
The Jama Masjid was completed in 1995 and subsequently became a three-storied building. The building does not have any pillars inside the main prayer hall and can accommodate approximately 2,000 worshippers for daily prayers and c. 5,000 worshippers on Eid prayers.

== 2015 leadership controversy in Tablighi Jamat ==
The leadership of the Tablighi Jamat split in 2015 when Muhammad Saad Kandhlawi claimed to be the sole leader of Tablighi Jamat. It ended up in two groups, one headed by Kandhlawi at Nizamuddin Markaz Mosque, in Delhi, and the other headed by the "shura", based at Jama Masjid in Nerul. Ebrahim Dewla, Ahmed Laat, and others were appointed to lead the "shura" group.

== Gallery ==
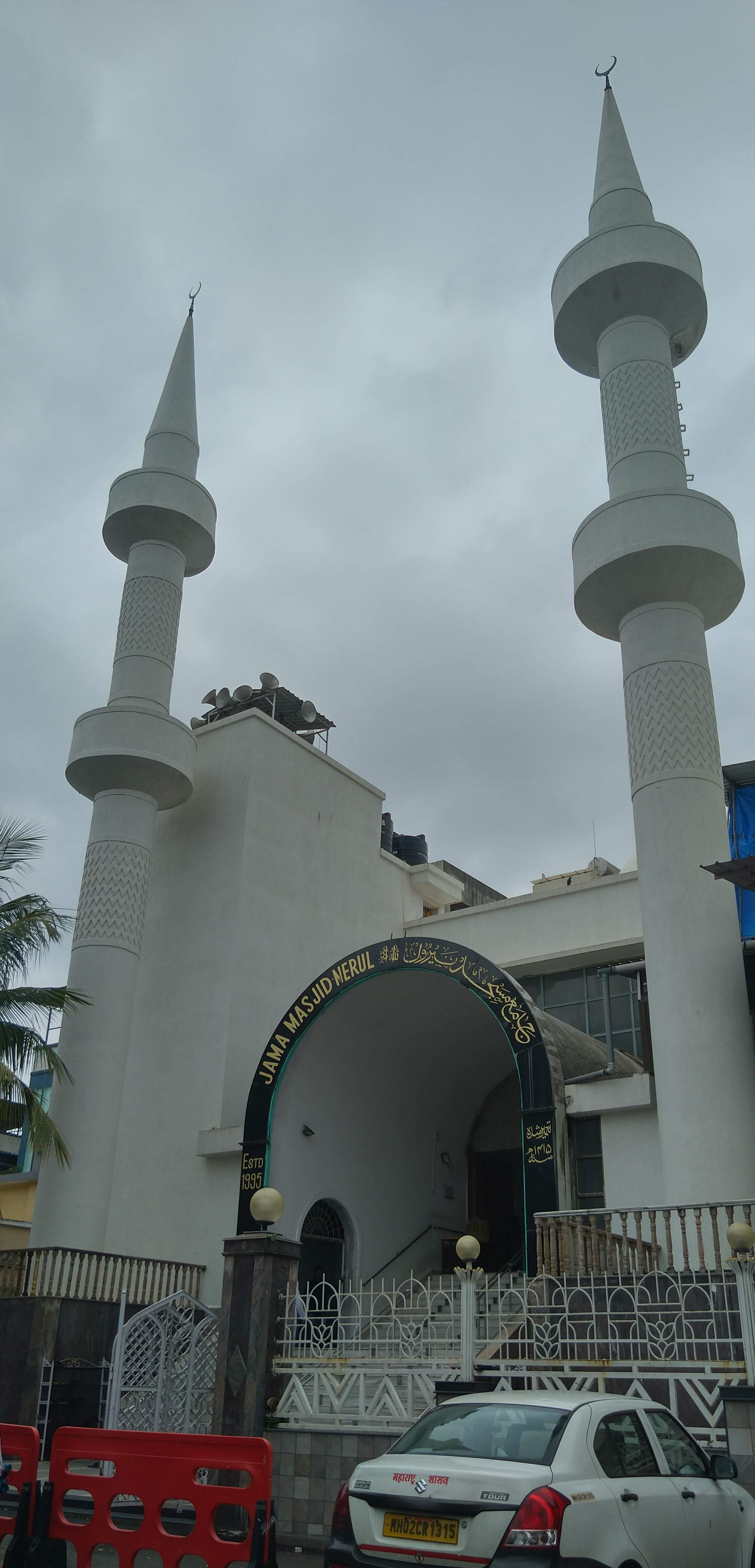
The two minarets

== See also ==
- Islam in India
- List of mosques in India
- 2020 Tablighi Jamaat COVID-19 hotspot in Delhi
