= Gulab Khan =

Pakistani politician

Member of the Provincial Assembly of Balochistan
- In office 29 May 2013 – 31 May 2018

Personal details
- Born: 10 February 1982 (age 44) Zhob
- Party: Jamiat Ulema-e Islam (F)

Gulab Khan is a Pakistani politician who was a Member of the Provincial Assembly of Balochistan from May 2013 to May 2018.

== Early life and education ==
He was born on 10 February 1982 in Zhob.

He graduated from Wafaq ul Madaris Al-Arabia and is a teacher by profession.

== Political career ==
He was elected to the Provincial Assembly of Balochistan as a candidate of Jamiat Ulema-e Islam (F) from Constituency PB-18 Sherani / Zhob in the 2013 Pakistani general election.

== See also ==
- List of Deobandis
