= Shoaib Khan Afridi =

Pakistani politician

Muhammad Shoaib Khan Afridi

Member-elect of the Provincial Assembly of Khyber Pakhtunkhwa
- Constituency: PK-115 (ex-Frontier Regions)

Personal details
- Party: Jamiat Ulema-e-Islam (F) (2019-present)

Muhammad Shoaib Khan Afridi is a Pakistani politician who is member-elect of the Provincial Assembly of Khyber Pakhtunkhwa.

== Political career ==
Afridi contested the 2019 Khyber Pakhtunkhwa provincial election on 20 July 2019 from constituency PK-115 (ex-Frontier Regions) on the ticket of Jamiat Ulema-e-Islam (F). He won the election by the majority of 6,074 votes over the runner up Abid Rehman of Pakistan Tehreek-e-Insaf. He garnered 18,102 votes while Rehman received 12,028 votes.

== See also ==
- List of Deobandis
