= Ehtisham ul Haq Thanvi =

Pakistani Islamic scholar

khatib-i-Pakistan Maulana Ehtisham ul Haq Thanvi
- (Urdu: مولانا احتشام الحق تھانوی)

Personal life
- Born: 15 May 1915 Thana Bhawan, Muzaffarnagar district, Uttar Pradesh, India
- Died: 11 April 1980 (aged 64) Madras, India
- Cause of death: Heart attack
- Resting place: Jamia Masjid Thanwi Karachi
- Children: Maulana Tanveer-ul-Haq Thanvi
- Education: Darul Uloom Deoband; Madarsa Islami Meerut; Mazahir Uloom Saharanpur; Panjab University; Allahabad University

Religious life
- Religion: Islam
- Denomination: Sunni
- Jurisprudence: Hanafi
- Movement: Deobandi
- Profession: Islamic scholar researcher Islamic jurist khatib

Muslim leader
- Teacher: Hussain Ahmad Madani; Shabbir Ahmad Usmani; Izaz Ali Amrohi; Asghar Hussain Deobandi; Muhammad Ibrahim Bilawi

Ehtisham ul Haq Thanvi (born; 15 May 1915 – 11 April 1980) (Urdu: مولانا احتشام الحق تھانوی) was a Pakistani Islamic scholar, researcher, Islamic jurist and khatib.

== Early life and education ==
Thanvi was born in 1915 to Zahoor ul Haq in Thana Bhawan, India. After memorization of the Quran at the age of 12, he studied Persian books from Madrasa Arabia Meerut and Arabic education from Mazahir Uloom Saharanpur. He then entered to Darul Uloom Deoband in 1930 and graduated in 1937. In 1937, he passed the examinations of Aalim Fazil from Allahabad University and Punjab University. He had a spiritual and kinship relationship with Ashraf Ali Thanwi. His teachers include Hussain Ahmad Madani, Shabbir Ahmad Usmani, Izaz Ali Amrohi, Asghar Hussain Deobandi, Muhammad Ibrahim Balyawi.

== Career ==
In 1939 Ehtesham-ul-Haq started his preaching activities in New Delhi. From that time onwards, he also met eminent political personalities including Liaquat Ali Khan, Khawaja Nazimuddin and Abdur Rab Nishtar. He continued to preach in Ashraf Ali Thanvi's Majlis Dawa-ul-Haq from 1930 to August 1947. Meanwhile, he received a message from Liaquat Ali Khan to participate in the 1945 elections, on the advice of his leadership, he never participated in elections or accepted participation in any political party. From 1940 to 1947, he spent his time only in preaching. On 9 August 1947, during the partition, Thanvi came to Karachi and later to the Jacob Lines where the Jamia Masjid Thanvi (named after him) is located today, which was then a small mosque. Ehtesham-ul-Haq along with Liaquat Ali Khan played an important role in the resettlement of the refugees from India.

== Death ==
He died on 11 April 1980, of a heart attack, the body was brought from Delhi to Karachi on a special flight and led to rest next to Jamia Masjid Thanwi Karachi.

== See more ==
- List of Deobandis
