= Abdur Rashid (Pakistani politician) =

Pakistani politician

Senator Maulana Abdur Rashid

Member of the Senate of Pakistan
- In office March 2006 – March 2012
- Constituency: FATA

Personal details
- Party: Jamiat Ulema-e-Islam (F)

Maulana Abdur Rashid (مولانا عبدالرشید) is a Pakistani Islamic scholar and politician who served as Senator from March 2006 to March 2012.

== See also ==
- List of Deobandis
