= Said Janan =

Pakistani politician

MPA Said Janan

Member of the Khyber Pakhtunkhwa Assembly
- Constituency: PK-43 (Hangu-II)
- In office 2013–2018

Personal details
- Party: Jamiat Ulema-e-Islam (F)
- Occupation: Politician

Said Janan is a Pakistani politician from Hangu District who served as the member of the Khyber Pakhtunkhwa Assembly for the Jamiat Ulema-e-Islam (F). He also served as chairman and member of the different committees.

== Political career ==
Mufti Said Janan was elected as the member of the Khyber Pakhtunkhwa Assembly on ticket of Jamiat Ulema-e-Islam (F) from PK-43 (Hangu-II) in the 2013 Pakistani general election.

He also contested the 2018 General Elections but he only managed to secure 44 votes.

== See also ==
- List of Deobandis
