= Ahmad Laat =

Shura member of Tablighi Jamaat

Personal life
- Born: Kavi, Bharuch, Gujarat, India
- Main interest: Dawah
- Education: Nadwatul Ulema
- Occupation: Islamic preacher

Religious life
- Religion: Islam
- Denomination: Sunni
- Jurisprudence: Hanafi
- Movement: Tablighi Jamaat

Muslim leader
- Disciple of: Talha Kandhlawi

Ahmad Laat (Urdu: مولانا احمد لاٹ, Gujarati: મૌલાના અહમદ લાટ) is an Indian Islamic cleric and preacher and a senior member of International Advisory Council (ʿālamī shūrā) of Tablighi Jamaat. He heads the shura faction of Tablighi Jamaat at Nerul Markaz. He also delivers speeches in Raiwind Ijtema every year.

== Biography ==
Ahmad Laat was born in village Kavi, Bharuch, Gujarat and is currently residing in Surat, Gujarat. He is a member of the international advisory council (ʿālamī shūrā) of the Tablighi Jamaat. He is one of the disciples of Maulana Abul Hasan Ali Hasani Nadwi. He completed his Islamic studies in 1962 from Nadwatul Ulama, Lucknow, India.

== See also ==
- List of Deobandis
