= Amanat Shah Haqqani =

Pakistani politician

Member of the Khyber Pakhtunkhwa Assembly

General Secretary of Jamiat Ulema-e-Islam (F) Mardan
- Incumbent
- Assumed office 2020

Personal details
- Party: Jamiat Ulema-e-Islam (F)
- Profession: Politician

Amanat Shah Haqqani is a Pakistani politician from Mardan District who served as member of the Khyber Pakhtunkhwa Assembly. As of 2020, he is serving as General secretary of Jamiat Ulema-e-Islam (F) Mardan. In December 2021, he also ran in the local elections for mayor of Mardan.

== See also ==
- List of Deobandis
