= Ubaidullah Anwar =

Pakistani Islamic scholar (1926-1985)

- Born: 2 August 1926; Lahore, Punjab, British India (now Pakistan)
- Died: 27 April 1985 (aged 58); Lahore, Punjab, Pakistan
- Education: Mazahir Uloom, Saharanpur; Darul Uloom Deoband
- Occupations: Islamic scholar, politician
- Known for: Vice-emir of Jamiat Ulema-e-Islam
- Parent: Ahmed Ali Lahori (father)

Ubaidullah Anwar (2 August 1926 – 27 April 1985) was a Pakistani Islamic scholar, politician and vice-emir of Jamiat Ulema-e-Islam.

He was also president of Anjuman Khudamuddin Lahore, Madrasa Qasim Uloom, Sheranwala, Lahore and the patron of Weekly Khudamuddin. He is the son of Ahmed Ali Lahori.

== Education ==
After memorizing the Holy Qur'an in Lahore, he entered Mazahir Uloom, Saharanpur, British India for primary and secondary education. Where he learned from Asadullah Rampuri, Abdul Rahman Kamilpuri and Jameel Ahmed Thanvi. Later, he went to Darul Uloom Deoband and studied with Hussain Ahmad Madani, Muhammad Ibrahim Balyawi, Rasool Khan Hazarvi, Muhammad Shafi and Muhammad Idris Kandhlawi. After completing Tafsir, Hadith, Jurisprudence and Kalam, he graduated in 1947.

He pledged allegiance to his father Ahmed Ali Lahori and received the caliphate from him.

== Teaching ==
After graduation, he was appointed as an instructor in Madressa Mazhirul Uloom, Karachi. After about 6 years, he visited Lahore and started teaching on a platform of Misri Shah neighbourhood of Lahore, Pakistan. Taught Quran for about 10 years.

== Death ==
He died on 7 Sha'ban 1405 AH (27 April 1985).

== See also ==
- List of Deobandis

== Sources ==
- مولانا عبیداللہ انور : شخصیت اور جدو جہد : Maulānā ̒Ubaidullāh Anvar : Shaḵẖṣiyyat aur jidd o jahd (Personality and Struggle) / امجد علی شاکر : Amjad ̒Alī Shākir
- 236
