= Zahid Ur Rashdi =

Pakistani islamic scholar (born 1948)

Sheikh-ul-Hadees, Maulana Zahid Ur Rashdi(Khan)
- مولانا زاہد الراشدی

Personal life
- Born: Muhammad Abdul Mateen Khan Zahid; 28 October 1948 (age 77) Gujranwala, Punjab, Pakistan
- Children: Ammar Khan Nasir
- Parent: Muhammad Sarfaraz Khan Safdar (father)
- Political party: Jamiat Ulema-e-Islam (F)
- Main interest: Hadith
- Education: Wafaq ul Madaris Al-Arabia, Pakistan; Jamia Nusrat Ul Uloom Gujranwala
- Relatives: Abdul Hameed Swati (uncle)
- Website: zahidrashdi.org

Religious life
- Religion: Islam
- Denomination: Sunni
- Institute: Institute of Policy Studies; Jamia Nusrat Ul Uloom Gujranwala
- Founder of: Al-Sharia Academy
- Profession: Islamic Scholar writer

Muslim leader
- Teacher: Abdul Hameed Swati; Muhammad Sarfaraz Khan Safdar
- Students: Noor Mohammad Saqib
- Awards: Tamgha-e-Imtiaz (2015)

Mawlānā Zahid Ur Rashdi (born 28 October 1948) (Urdu: مولانا زاہد الراشدی) is a Pakistani Islamic scholar, writer, editor, columnist and founding director of Al-Sharia Academy, Gujranwala. He has served in various positions in different political and educational institutions.

== Early life and education ==
Rashdi was born in Ghakhar to Muhammad Sarfaraz Khan Safdar. He completed Hifz ul Quran from Madrasa Tajweed-ul-Quran Ghakhar, Dars-i Nizami from Jamia Nusrat Ul Uloom Gujranwala, under his father Muhammad Sarfaraz Khan Safdar and uncle Abdul Hameed Swati. He also studied at Wafaq ul Madaris Al-Arabia, Pakistan.

== Career ==
He served as a teacher of Dars-i Nizami at Madrasa Anwar-ul-Uloom Gujranwala from 1970 to 1990, currently serving as president and Sheikh-ul-Hadees of Jamia Nusrat Ul Uloom Gujranwala since 2000. He also served as a member of the National Academic Council of Institute of Policy Studies, Islamabad.

== Political career ==
Zahid Ur Rashdi served as information secretary of Jamiat Ulema-e-Islam Pakistan (as Deputy of Mufti Mahmood from 1975 to 1980), Deputy Secretary-General of Jamiat Ulema-e-Islam Pakistan from 1980 to 1990, Secretary-General Pakistan National Alliance, Punjab from 1977 to 1979 and Vice President Islami Jamhoori Ittehad, Punjab from 1987 to 1990.

== Literary works ==
Since 1965, he has published more than 2000 articles on scientific, political and national issues in various newspapers and magazines and book collections on various topics.

- Khutbat e Rashdi
- Asr e Hazir Mein Ijtihad
- Deeni Madaris Ka Nisab o Nizam

== Award and honors ==
- Tamgha-e-Imtiaz in Education (2015)
- Former member of the Institute of Policy Studies (Pakistan)
- He is also delivering lecturer as a guest in various institutions.
