= Nadwasarai =

Nadwakhas Nadwasarai
- village
- Location in Uttar Pradesh, India Nadwakhas (India)
- Coordinates: 26°4′56″N 83°27′43″E
- Country: India
- State: Uttar Pradesh
- District: Mau

Population (2011)
  - Total: 5,003

Languages
  - Official: Hindi
- Time zone: UTC+5:30 (IST)
- PIN: 275302

Nadwasarai (Nadwakhas) is a small village situated 10 km away from Ghosi in Mau district, Uttar Pradesh, India.

It is a typical village with a population of approximately 5000 to 6000 people as per 2011 population. The village does not have a reliable 24-hour electricity supply and amenities are basic . In 2005 a telephone exchange was constructed It was the first village in India where The Human Resource Development Foundation (HRDF) established a school. The school, Bal Shishu Niketan, was established in 1990 as a Primary school and nursery; it has since been upgraded by the District Education Department of Mau to a class VIII school. There are 350 students, of whom around 30% are female.
