= Akram Nadwi =

British Islamic scholar (born 1963)

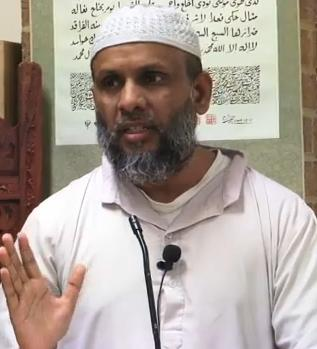

Personal life
- Born: 1963 (age 62–63) Jaunpur, Uttar Pradesh, India
- Notable work: Al-Muhaddithat
- Education: Darul Uloom Nadwatul Ulama; University of Lucknow
- Occupation: Author, professor, Islamic scholar, former research fellow at the University of Oxford
- Website: www.akramnadwi.com

Religious life
- Religion: Islam
- Jurisprudence: Hanafi, Ijtihad
- Movement: Nadwi-Deobandi

Muslim leader
- Teacher: Abul Hasan Ali Hasani Nadwi
- Students: Mohammed Hijab
- Influenced by: Abu Hanifa, Ibn Hazm, Ibn Taymiyyah, Shah Waliullah, Hamiduddin Farahi, Abul Hasan Ali Nadwi

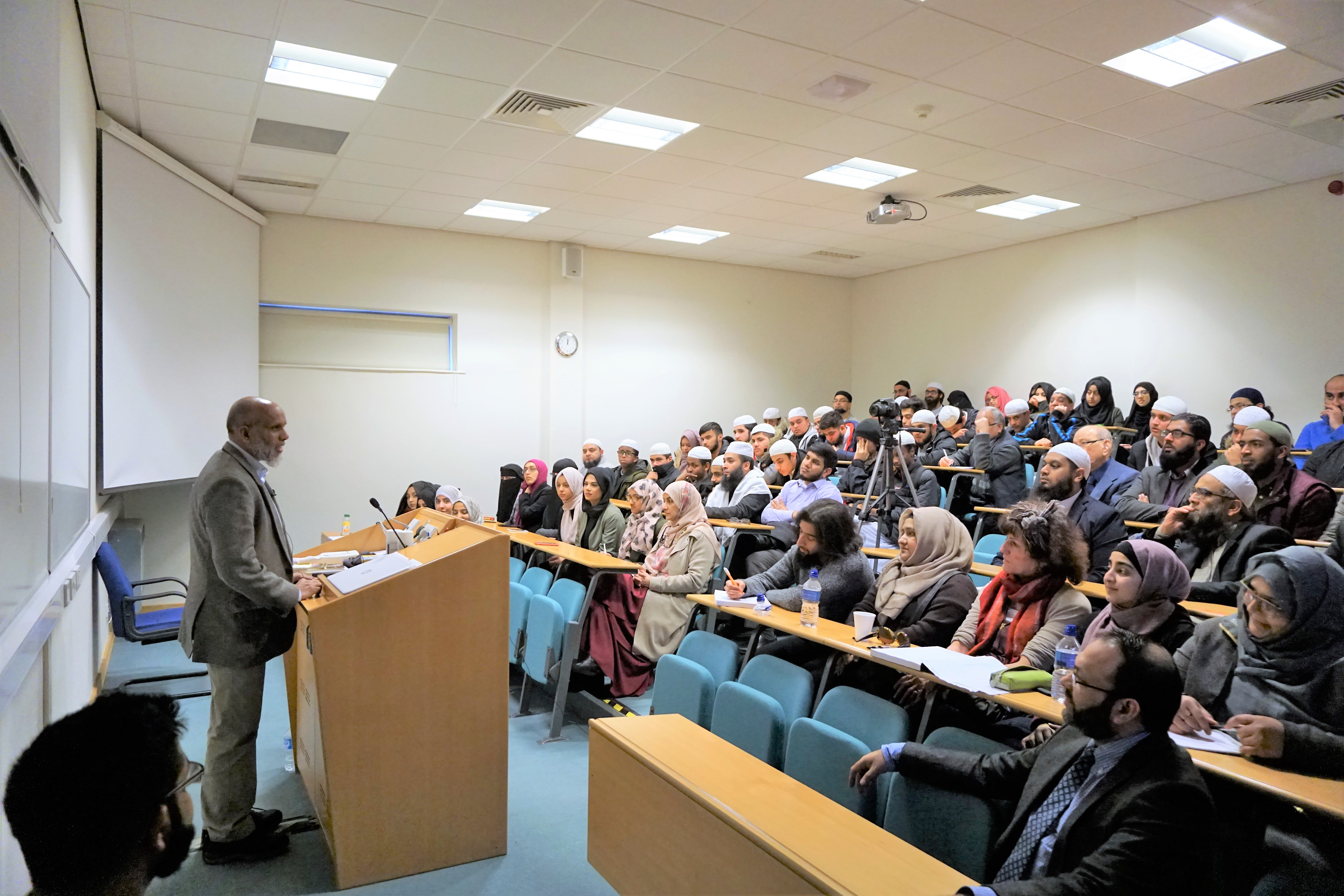
Shaykh Nadwi lecturing at the Markfield Institute

Mohammad Akram Nadwi (born c. 1963) is a British Islamic scholar and the Director of Research & Founding Scholar at the ASI Research Centre, Principal of Al-Salam Institute, Dean of Cambridge Islamic College, and an Honorary Visiting Fellow at the Markfield Institute of Higher Education. He is the author of the 43-volume biographical dictionary called Al-Wafa bi Asma al-Nisa (Biographical Dictionary of Women Narrators of Hadith), which chronicles the lives of 10,000 female hadith scholars and narrators.

== Education ==
Nadwi was educated at the Darul Uloom Nadwatul Ulama in Lucknow, India.

== Writings ==
He has written over 60 books in Arabic, English and Urdu in the fields of hadith, fiqh, biography, Arabic grammar and syntax. In 2021, his 43-volume biographical dictionary of the muhaddithat, the female scholars and narrators of hadith, was published by Dar al-Minhaj (Jeddah, Saudi Arabia).

Nadwi is the subject of the 2015 book If The Oceans Were Ink by journalist Carla Power. Power spent a year studying Islam and the Qur'an with Nadwi.

== Publications ==
=== English ===
1. Madrasah Life A student’s day at Nadwat al-‘Ulamā’ (Turath Publishing London, 2007)
2. Al-Fiqh Al-Islāmī According to the Hanafi Madhab Rites of Purification, Prayers and Funerals Vol 1 (Angelwing Media London, 2007, 2012)
3. Al-Muhaddithat: the woman scholars in Islam (Interface Publications Oxford 2007, 2013)
4. The Garden of The Ḥadīth Scholars Bustān al-Muḥaddithin - Translated and edited by Mohammad Akram Nadwi from Persian to Arabic (Turath Publishing London 2007, 2018)
5. Abū Ḥanīfah His Life, Legal Method & Legacy. (Kube Publishing Ltd Leicester, Interface Publications Ltd Oxford, 2010)
6. Al-Fiqh Al-Islāmī According to the Hanafi Madhab Rites of Zakah, Fasting and Hajj Vol 2 (Angelwing Media London, 2012)
7. Shaykh ‘Abū al-Ḥasan ‘Alī Nadwī His Life & Works (Nadwi Foundation West Yorkshire, 2013)
8. Ibn Ḥazm on the lawfulness of women attending prayers in the mosque (Interface Publications Ltd Oxford, Cambridge Islamic College Cambridge 2015, 2018)
9. Al-Muḥaddithāt women scholars of hadith (Ibn Haldun University Press Istanbul, 2019)
10. Journey to Andalus - Translated and edited by Dr. Abu Zayd. (Angelwing Media London, 2019)
11. Lessons Learned Treasures from Nadwah's Sages (Quran Literacy Press Somerset, 2019)
12. Remembering Beautiful Days In Jerusalem (Al Buruj Press London, 2020)
13. Foundation To Ḥadīh Science A primer on understanding & Studying Hadith - Translated and edited by Dr. Abu Zayd. (Quran Literacy Press New Jersey 2021, Al-Salam Institute Press 2021)
14. Bangabandhu memorial lecture The Hadith: Preservation and Development (Bangabandhu Research Centre for Islam and Interreligious Dialogue Chittagong, 2023
15. An excellent introduction to ṣaḥīḥ al-bukhārī and its hidden gems and methodologies - Translated and edited by Shaykh Umer Khan (United States of America 2024)
16. Journey to America Vol 1 - Translated by Shaykh Umer Khan (United States of America 2024)
17. Riḥlat al-Ḥijāz - Translated by Dilwar Ali (Gripper Mark Publication Dhaka, 2025)

=== Urdu ===
1. ‘Iraq aur Sa‘ūdī ‘Arab (Muslim Intellectual Forum Lucknow, 1990)
2. ‘Iraq aur Īrān (Muslim Intellectual Forum Lucknow, 1990)
3. ‘Iraq ki jāriḣiyyat aur tawsī‘ pasandi (Muslim Intellectual Forum Lucknow, 1990)
4. Armughāne farang peghām briṭāniya ke musalmāno ke nām (Allamah Abul Hasan Ali Nadwi Academy London, 2004)
5. Armughāne ḥajj ḥadīth ke ek tālibe ‘ilm ka safarnāmah (Anjuman khuddam al-Islam Lahore, 2004)
6. Nadwe ka ek din (Majlis Nashriyyat Islam Karachi, 2006, Dar al-Rashid Lucknow, 2007, reprint 2012)
7. Safarnāmah Hind (Dar al-Rashid Lucknow, 2018)
8. Maghribī UP ka ek yādgār safar (Dar al-Buhuth wa al-Nashr Saharanpur, 2018)
9. Armughāne ḥajj ḥadith ke ek tālibe ilm ka safarnāmah (Maktaba Ahsan Lucknow, 2018)
10. Fikr Yunus (Dar al-Buhuth wa al-Nashr Saharanpur, 2019, Majlis nashriyyat islam Karachi, 2023)
11. Ek haftah Hindustān mein (Maktabah Ihsan Lucknow, 2019)
12. Maqāme ṣaḥāba ishkālāt wa jawābāt (Dar al-Rashid Lucknow, 2021)
13. Dhikr nadwah (Mahad Imam Hasan ul Banna Bhatkal, 2022)
14. Muḥaddithāt ‘ilm ḥādīth ke irtiqā' me khawātīn ki khidmat (Hidayat publishers and distributors New Delhi, 2022)
15. Umm al-mu'minīn ḥaḍrat ‘aishah ṣiddīqa raḍiya allah ‘anha ki ‘umr biwaqt rukhṣati (Majlis tahqiqat wa nashriyat islam Lucknow, 2022, Majlis nashriyyat islam Karachi, 2022, Maktaba khatm nubuwwah Gujranwala, 2023)
16. Iṣlāḥ kī tadbīr (QuranWaHadith.com Madhya Pradesh, 2024)
17. Taalib Ilmi (QuranWaHadith.com Madhya Pradesh, 2024)
18. Watn ke Phere (QuranWaHadith.com Madhya Pradesh, 2024)
19. Gaun Ka Larka (QuranWaHadith.com Madhya Pradesh, 2025
20. Masāil wa Nawāzil (QuranWaHadith.com Madhya Pradesh, 2026)
21. Māwiyazdān (QuranWaHadith.com Madhya Pradesh, 2026)
22. Yāiy Istidlāliyān (QuranWaHadith.com Madhya Pradesh, 2026)
23. Taḥqiqāt Sunnat wa Hadith (QuranWaHadith.com Madhya Pradesh, 2026)
24. Dhikr Wādiḥ (Dar al-Rashid Lucknow, 2026)
25. Pār Maharbān (Dar al-Rashid Lucknow, 2026)
26. Murabbi Taḥqiq wa Naẓar (Dar al-Rashid Lucknow, 2026)

=== Arabic ===
1. Al-tarbiyatu wa al-mujtama‘ - Translated and edited by Mohammad Akram Nadwi. (Al-dar al-shamiyyah Beirut, Dar al-Qalam Damascus, 1991)
2. Shaykh al-islām ibn taymiyyah wa ta’thīrhi fī āsiya al-janūbiyah - Translated and edited by Mohammad Akram Nadwi. (Oxford Centre for Islamic Studies Oxford, 1992)
3. Nafaḥāt al-hind wa al-yaman bi’asānīd al-shaykh abī al-ḥasan (Maktabat al-imam al-shafi‘i Riyadh,1998
4. Uṣūl al-shāshī mukhtaṣar fī uṣūl al-fiqh al-islāmi - Edited and annotated by Mohammad Akram Nadwi. (Nadwat al-‘ulama Lucknow, 1998, Dar al-gharb al-islami Beirut, 2000, QuranWaHadith.com Madhya Pradesh, 2024)
5. Al-sayyid sulaymān al-nadwī amīru ‘ulamā al-hind fī ‘asrihi wa shaykh al-nadwiyyīn (Dar al-Qalam Damascus, 2001)
6. Shiblī al-nu‘mānī ‘allāmat al-hind al-adīb wa al-mu’arrikh al-nāqid al-arīb (Dar al-Qalam Damascus, 2001)
7. Kifāyat al-rāwī ‘an al-‘allāmat al-shaykh Yusuf al-Qardāwī (Dar al-Qalam Damascus, 2001)
8. Bughyat al-matābi‘ li asānīd al-‘allāmat al-sharīf muḥammad al-rabi‘ (Dar al-Qalam Damascus, 2001. Dar al-muqtabas Beirut, 2022)
9. Bustān al-muḥaddithīn -Translated and edited by Mohammad Akram Nadwi (Dar al-gharb al-islami Beirut, 2002, Dar al-kutub Peshawar nd)
10. Al-’iqd al-lujayni fi asānīd al-shaykh Salmān al-Ḥusaynī (Dar al-gharb al-Islami, 2004. Dar al-sunnah al-Hind, nd)
11. Mabadi’ al-naḥw. (Dar al-tarbiyah, 2006. Maktabat Ihsan Lucknow, nd. Al-Salam Institute Press London, 2019)
12. Mabadi’ al-taṣrīf (Dar al-tarbiyah, 2006. Maktabat Ihsan Lucknow, 2019. Al-Salam Institute Press London, 2019)
13. Abu al-ḥasan al-nadwī al-‘ālim al-murabbi wa al-dā‘iyat al-ḥakīm (Dar al-Qalam Damascus, 2006)
14. Ayyāmun fī bilād al-shām (Dar al-tarbiyah Damascus, 2007. Complete edition Dar al-hadith al-kattaniya Tangier, 2021)
15. Mabadi’ fī ‘Ilm uṣūl al-fiqh (Dar al-tarbiyah, 2007. Al-maktabat al-nadwiyyah Lucknow, 2018. Al-Salam Institute Press London, 2019)
16. Mabadi’ fī uṣūl al-ḥadīth wa al-isnād (Dar al-tarbiyah, 2007. Al-Salam Institute Press London, 2019. Maktabat Ihsan Lucknow, nd)
17. Mabadi’ fī ‘Ilm uṣūl al-tafsīr (Dar al-tarbiyah, 2007. Al-Salam Institute Press London, 2019)
18. Riḥlat shiblī al-nu‘mānī ila al-qusṭanṭīniyyah wa bayrūt wa al-quds wa al-qāhirah - Translated and edited by Mohammad Akram Nadwi. (Dar al-Qalam Damascus, 2011)
19. Ayyāmun zāhiratun fī miṣr wa al-qāhirah (Dar al-Qalam Damascus 2011)
20. Al-shaykh al-muḥaddith ‘abd al-haqq al-dahlawiyyu ḥayātuhu wa āthāruh -Translated by Mohammad Akram Nadwi (Dar al-Qalam Damascus, 2013)
21. Al-farāid fī ‘awālī al-asānīdi wa ghawālī al-fawāid (Thabatu al-shaykh yūnus jaunfūrī) (Dar al-bashair al-islamiyyah Beirut, 2015)
22. Tārīkhu ard al-qur’ān - Translated and edited by Mohammad Akram Nadwi (Dar al-Qalam Damascus, 2016)
23. Al-Dhikr al-jamīl li’ayyāmin fī al-quds wa al-khalīl (Dar al-bashair al-islamiyyah Beirut, Markaz al-warraq Kuwait 2018)
24. Man ‘allamanī? (Dar al-Rashid Lucknow, 2018, Maktabat al-manhal al-safi, 2019)
25. Riḥlat al-andalus (Dar al muqtabas Damascus, 2018)
26. Juz’un fī al-aḥādīth al-‘awālī al-thumāniyyāt wa al-tusā‘iyyāt (Dar al-bashair al-islamiyyah Beirut, 2018)
27. Riḥlatu Amrīkā (Wizarat al-awqafi wa al-shu’un al-Islamiyyah, 2019)
28. Mabadi’ al-manṭiq (Al-Salam Institute Press London, 2019)
29. Mabadi’ al-balāghah (Al-Salam Institute Press London, 2019)
30. Al-‘allāmat al-sharīf muḥammad wāḑiḥ rashīd al-ḥasanī al-nadwī ḥayātuhu wa fikruhu wa a‘maluhu (Maktabat salma al-thaqafiyyah Tetouan, 2019)
31. Al-imām ibn taymiyyah al-ḥarrānī mujaddidan liqarnih - Translated and edited by Mohammad Akram Nadwi (Dar al-bashair al-islamiyyah Beirut, 2019)
32. Al-iḥkām lilmujma‘ ‘alayhi min aḥādīth al-iḥkām (Dar al-samman Istanbul, 2019)
33. Al-kanz al-farīd fi tarjamat al-‘allāmat muḥammad mutī‘al-ḥāfiẓ wa a‘malihi wa mā lahu min al-ittiṣālāti wa al-asānīd (Dar al-bashair al-islamiyyah Beirut, 2019)
34. Al-Tahrīr al-sadīd limā li al-shaykh muḥammad ma‘sūd al-‘azīzī al-nadwī min ittiṣālāt wa asānīd (Markaz ihya al-fikr al-islami Saharanpur, 2020)
35. Al-durr al-farīd fī ikhtiṣār ‘awālī al-asānīd (Markaz ihya al-fikr al-islami Saharanpur, 2020)
36. Qurrat al-‘ayn fī ḥajj al-bayti wa ziyārat al-ḥaramayn (Al-firdaws Alexandria, 2021)
37. Tamhīd ‘ilm al-ḥadīth (Dar al-samman Istanbul, 2021)
38. Al-wafā’u bi asmā al-nisāi mawsu‘atu tarājimi a‘lām al-nisāi fī al-ḥadīth al-nabawiyy al-sharīf 43 vols (Dar al-minhaj Jeddah, 2021)
39. Ḥikmat al-ṣalāt majmū‘at al-ifādāt ‘an al-ṣalāt li al-imām ‘abd al-ḥamīd al-farāhī (Dar Ammar, Amman, 2021) Compiled and annotated by Mohammad Akram Nadwi
40. Madkhal rāi‘ ila ṣaḥīḥ al-bukhārī wa mā fīhi min asrāri wa ṣanāi‘ (Dar Ammar Amman, 2021. Al-Salam Institute Press London, 2021. QuranWaHadith.com Madhya Pradesh, 2024)
41. Riḥlat turkiyā (Dar al-asalah Istanbul, 2021)
42. Naẓarāt īmāniyya majmū‘at maqālāt tata‘allaq bi uṣūl al-dīn mustanidat ila al-fiṭrat wa al-‘aql wa al-waḥyi (Dar al-muqtabas Beirut, 2022. QuranWaHadith.com Madhya Pradesh, 2024)
43. Imlāu al-khāṭir majmū‘at maqālāt mutafarriqa nushirat fī mawāqi‘ al-tawāsul al-ijtimā‘I (Dar al-muqtabas Beirut, 2022. QuranWaHadith.com Madhya Pradesh, 2024)
44. Riḥlat al-‘umrah riḥlat sanat 1441h, wa riḥlat sanat 1443h, (Dar al-muqtabas Beirut, 2022)
45. Tārīkh nadwat al-‘ulamā' 2 vols. (Dar al-bashaer Beirut, 2022)
46. Al-jāmi‘ al-mu‘īn fī ṭabaqāt al-shuyukh al-mutqinīn wa al-mujīzīn al-musnidīn 7 vols (Dar al-kotob al-ilmiyah Beirut, 2023)
47. Ittiḥāf al-kibār bi asānīd al-shaykh al-muḥaddith abī ‘ammār thabat al-rāshidī (Maktabat khatm al-nubuwwah Gujranwala, 2023)
48. Fatāwā wa abḥāth fiqhiyyah mu‘āṣirah (Dar al-muqtabas Beirut, 2024. Al-Salam Institute Press London, 2024)
49. Al-mufaṣṣal fī al-sīrah al-nabawiyyah (Dar al-muqtabas Beirut, 2024. Al-Salam Institute Press London, 2024)
50. Riḥlat al-hind (Dar al-muqtabas Beirut, 2024)
51. Al-mu‘tamad fī uṣūl al-fatwā (Dar al-muqtabas Beirut, 2024. Al-Salam Institute Press London, 2024)
52. Riḥlat uzbikistān (Dar al-muqtabas Beirut, 2024)
53. Ṡafwat al-‘aqāid (Dar al-muqtabas Beirut, 2024. Al-Salam Institute Press London, 2024)
54. Iskāt al-mu‘tadī ‘alā inṣāt al-muqtadī - edited and annotated by Mohammad Akram Nadwi (Dar al-bashair al-islamiyyah Beirut, 2024)
55. Naẓm ul-liāli fī al-Musalsal al-āli (ASI Press, 2026)

=== Bosnian ===
1. Muhaddise učenjakinje u islamu - Translated by Naida Hota-Muminović and Nermina Baljević (Centar za napredne studije, 2018)

=== Malayalam ===
1. Muhaddithat, Malayalam- Translated by Muhammad Anees (Book plus publishers Malappuram, 2021)

=== Indonesian ===
1. Al-Muhadditsat Ulama perempuan dalam bidang hadits - Translated by Fahmy Yamani (Gema Insani Jakarta, 2022)

=== Bangla ===
Two different translations:

1. Muhaddithat, Bangla (2022)
2. Muhaddithat, Bangla (2022)

=== Malay ===
1. Muhaddisat Wanita Periwayat Hadis - Translated by Faiq Sharin and Syazani Satri (Siri Pencerahan Selangor, 2025)
