= Shamsul Haq Afghani =

Pakistani Islamic scholar

Shaykh-ul-Tafsir, Allama Syed Shamsul Haq Afghani
- علامہ سیّد شمس الحق افغانی

1st President of Wifaq ul Madaris Al-Arabia, Pakistan
- In office 19 October 1959 – 12 January 1963
- Preceded by: None (office created)
- Succeeded by: Maulana Khair Muhammad Jalandhari

Judge and Minister of Education of the Khanate of Kalat
- In office –

Personal life
- Born: 8 January 1901 Turangzai, Punjab, British India
- Died: 16 August 1983 (aged 82)
- Education: Darul Uloom Deoband

Religious life
- Religion: Islam
- Denomination: Sunni
- Institute: Darul Uloom Deoband; Wafaq ul Madaris; Islamia University of Bahawalpur
- Movement: Deobandi

Muslim leader
- Teacher: Anwar Shah Kashmiri; Mian Asghar Hussain Deobandi; Ashraf Ali Thanwi; Shabbir Ahmad Usmani; Muhammad Rasul Khan Hazarvi
- Students: Allama Khalid Mahmood
- Awards: Sitara-i-Imtiaz (1980)

Syed Shamsul Haq Afghani (born; 7 October 1898 died on – 14 August 1983) (Urdu: علامہ سیّد شمس الحق افغانی;(SI)) was an Afghan Islamic scholar and former President of Wifaq ul Madaris Al-Arabia, Pakistan from 19 October 1959 – 12 January 1963.

== Education ==
He received his early education from his father, then entered a primary school in 1909. Then got further education from different scholars of Khyber Pakhtunkhwa and Afghanistan. He got his higher education from Darul Uloom Deoband in 1920 and completed his "Dora-e-Hadith" in 1921. His teachers include famous religious scholars like, Anwar Shah Kashmiri Mian Asghar Hussain Deobandi Muhammad Rasul Khan Hazarvi Ashraf Ali Thanwi and Shabbir Ahmad Usmani.

== Career ==
In 1923, he was appointed as the President of Madrasa Mazharul Uloom Karachi. In 1924 he became the president of Madrasa Irshad Uloom Latakana, Sindh. In 1932 he was appointed as the President of Madras Darul Fuyuz Sindh. From 1932 to 1939, he was a high-ranking teacher and Shaykh-ul-Tafsir at Darul Uloom Deoband. In 1944 served as a teacher of Jamiah Islamiah Talimuddin Dabhel. In 1948 he served as the President of Madrasa Qasim-ul-Uloom, Lahore. In 1963 he became the Shaykh-ul-Tafsir of the Islamia University of Bahawalpur and taught for about 12 years. He also served as a member of the Council of Islamic Ideology.

== Literary works ==
Afghani has authored many books, including:

- Uloom ul Quran
- Science Aur Islam
- Ahkam ul Quran
- Mufradat ul Quran
- Mushkilat ul Quran
- Tasuwaf Aur Tameer e Kirdar
- Socialism Aur Islam
- communism Aur Islam
- Moin Al-Qada Wal Muftiyeen (Arabic)
- Ihtisab Qadianiat Volume 13
- Islami Jihad
- Science Aur Islam
- Sharh Zabita-e-Deewani
- Allami Mushkilat aur unka Qurani hal
- Sarmaya Darana Ishteraki Nizam Ka Islami Muashi Nizam Say Mawaznah

== See also ==
- List of Deobandis

== Sources ==
- علامہ شمس الحق افغانی کی قرآنی خدمات کا تحقیقی و تنقیدی مطالعہ
