= Syed Noor ul Hassan Bukhari =

Syed Noor ul Hassan
- Born: 1904
- Died: 1984 (aged 79–80); Multan
- Resting place: Jalal Bakri
- Education: Darul Uloom Deoband
- Occupations: Writer, scholar, teacher
- Years active: 1928–1984
- Organization: Tanzeem Ahlay Sunnat
- Notable work: Alashaab Fil kitaab

Syed Noor-ul-Hassan Bukhari was a Muslim Hanafi Deobandi Scholar, religious and political leader from the Indian subcontinent. He was one of founding members of the Tanzeem-e-Ahlay Sunnat.

== Writing and speaking career ==
Bukhari wrote historical, educational and religious books, including:

- Al Ashaab fil kitab
- Kashf ul Haqaiq
- Masaib us Sahabah
