= Abdul Hameed Nomani =

Indian Islamic scholar, journalist, and author (born 1965)

- عبد الحمید نعمانی
- Born: 12 December 1965 (age 60)
- Education: Darul Uloom Deoband (Daur-e-Hadith, 1986)
- Occupations: Islamic scholar, journalist, author
- Notable work: Hinduism: Taaruf o Mutala (4 volumes), Hindutva: Ahdaf o Masael, Jama Masjid Gyanvapi aur Banaras ki Deegar Tareekhi Masajid Haqeeqat aur Kahani, Hindutva aur Rashtravad, Sangh ke Bani Dr. Hedgewar: Hayat-o-Tehreek, Sawarkar: Fikr-o-Tehreek
- Movement: Deobandi

Abdul Hameed Nomani (born 12 December 1965) is an Indian Islamic scholar, journalist, author, and social commentator. He served in various positions in Jamiat Ulema-e-Hind for nearly three decades before being appointed General Secretary of the All India Muslim Majlis-e-Mushawarat in 2017.

== Early life and education ==
Abdul Hameed Nomani was born on 12 December 1965. He began his education at Madrasa Rahmania, Santhal Pargana (now in Jharkhand), followed by Madrasa Nāsir al-Uloom and Madrasa Shahi in Moradabad. In 1986, he graduated from Darul Uloom Deoband after completing Daur-e-Hadith (advanced Islamic studies) and receiving the qualification of Fazil.

During his student years at Deoband, Nomani edited Al-Bayan, a wall magazine representing students from Bihar, Odisha, and present-day Jharkhand. He also wrote articles for other newspapers and magazines, where his writings were published.

== Career ==
Nomani was associated with Jamiat Ulema-e-Hind (JUH) for nearly three decades. During his tenure, he served as its spokesperson and media secretary, headed its Publication Department, and also served as secretary, acting general secretary, and assistant general secretary of Jamiat Ulema-e-Hind (M).

In November 2008, he participated in organizing a conference attended by over 6,000 Islamic scholars, clerics, and leaders, which issued a condemnation of terrorism and stated that Islam does not condone violence or extremism. He commented, "Some people are involved in terrorist activities in the name of Islam, and some are defaming Islam by their involvement in such activities".

In 2017, he resigned from JUH after being transferred from its Media Department to the Muslim Secretariat. In May 2017, he was appointed General Secretary of the All India Muslim Majlis-e-Mushawarat (AIMMM).

He delivers lectures on Hinduism and its philosophy to students pursuing specialized studies at Darul Uloom Deoband.

== Literary works ==
Nomani has contributed to Urdu journalism, authoring more than 500 articles published in various Urdu newspapers and magazines.

As an author, he has published over a dozen books focusing on Hinduism, Hindutva politics, and Islamic studies.

He authored two Urdu books, Hinduism Taaruf o Mutala and Hindutva: Ahdaf o Masail, which present concepts from Hindu scriptures, including the Vedas, Puranas, and the Geeta, in Urdu for students. According to Nomani, "The students recite shlokas of the Geeta and the Vedas alongside verses of the Quran".

Some of his notable publications include:

- Hinduism: Taaruf-o-Mutala (transl. Introduction and Study of Hinduism, 4 volumes)
- Hindutva: Ahdaf-o-Masail (Hindutva: Goals and Challenges)
- Jama Masjid Gyanvapi aur Banaras ki Deegar Tareekhi Masajid: Haqeeqat aur Kahāni (transl. Jama Masjid Gyanvapi and Other Historical Mosques of Banaras: Reality and Fiction)
- Aurton ka Maqām Mazahib-e-Ālam Mein (transl. The Status of Women in World Religions)
- Hindutva aur Rashtravad (transl. Hindutva and Nationalism)
- Sangh ke Bani Dr. Hedgewar: Hayat-o-Tehreek (transl. Hedgewar, Founder of the Sangh: Life and Movement)
- Savarkar: Fikr-o-Tehreek (transl. Savarkar: Thought and Movement)

In 2024, his book on the Gyanvapi Mosque, titled Jama Masjid Gyanvapi aur Banaras ki Deegar Tareekhi Masajid: Haqeeqat aur Kahani (transl. Jama Masjid Gyanvapi and Other Historical Mosques of Banaras: Reality and Fiction), addressed the claim that the mosque was built by demolishing a temple. In this work, he questioned interpretations of historical texts, such as Maasir-i-Alamgiri, that are often cited to support such claims.

== Views and public positions ==
Nomani has expressed support for secularism, communal harmony, and interfaith dialogue. In April 2016, he emphasised the role of brotherhood and secular values in benefiting society.

Responding to a fatwa issued by Darul Uloom Deoband on television, he stated that watching permissible content on television is lawful.

He has also argued that Islamic fatwas should be understood within their specific context rather than being generalised.

He has stated that practices such as yoga are not foreign to Muslims, noting that similar exercises are found in Sufi traditions.

He participated in an interfaith panel discussion on homosexuality and Section 377 of the Indian Penal Code, presenting the Islamic perspective. He also stated that everyone with the right to vote should participate in the electoral process.

== Recognition ==
In 2024, Nomani was included in the "100 Most Influential Indian Muslims' list" by Muslim Mirror and the Minorities Media Foundation for his work in interfaith dialogue, religious scholarship, and journalism.
