= Tanveer-ul-Haq Thanvi =

Imam of Thanvi Masjid Karachi and Pakistani politician

Imam of Thanvi Masjid and Senator Maulana Tanveer-ul-Haq Thanvi

Member of the Senate of Pakistan
- Incumbent
- Assumed office May 2014

Personal details
- Party: PTI (2021-present)
- Other political affiliations: MQM-P (2014-2021)
- Parent: Ehtisham ul Haq Thanvi (father)

Maulana Tanveer-ul-Haq Thanvi son of Ehtisham ul Haq Thanvi (Urdu: مولانا تنویرالحق تھانوی) is a Current Imam of Thanvi Masjid, CEO of Jamia Ehtishamia Madarsa after his father's death in 1980 and Pakistani politician who has been a member of Senate of Pakistan since May 2014.

== Education ==
He Hifz Quran from Thanvi Masjid in early 60s then went to Jamia Darul-uloom Siddiqia, Karachi, Sindh, Pakistan for further studies and has a degree of Bachelor of Arts which he received from the University of Karachi in 1978.

== Political career ==
In September 2012, he was appointed president of the Muttahida Bain-ul-Muslimeen Forum.

He was elected to the Senate of Pakistan as a candidate of Muttahida Qaumi Movement from Sindh in May 2014 following the resignation of Syed Mustafa Kamal. In April 2018, he Joined Pakistan Muslim League (N) after a meeting with Mushaid Hussain. Later he joined Pakistan Tehreek-e-Insaaf in March 2021.
