= Zahid Hasan (scholar) =

Indian Islamic scholar (1918–1988)

Mawlana Zahid Hasan

Member of Legislative Assembly, Deoband constituency
- In office 1946–1952
- Preceded by: Sheikh Zia-ul-Haq Khan Bahadur Rajupuri

Personal life
- Born: 1918 Ibrahimī village, Sarsawa, Saharanpur district, United Provinces of Agra and Oudh, British India (present-day Uttar Pradesh, India)
- Died: 27 March 1988 (aged 69–70) Civil Hospital, Saharanpur, Uttar Pradesh
- Education: Darul Uloom Deoband
- Occupation: Islamic scholar, politician

Religious life
- Religion: Islam
- Denomination: Sunni Islam
- Jurisprudence: Hanafi
- Tariqa: Chishtiya-Sabiriya-Imdadiya
- Creed: Maturidi
- Movement: Deobandi

Muslim leader
- Teacher: Hussain Ahmad Madani; Asghar Hussain Deobandi; Muhammad Ibrahim Balyawi; Izaz Ali Amrohi; Shabbir Ahmad Usmani; Muhammad Shafi Deobandi; Abdul Haq Akorwi; Muhammad Idris Kandhlawi; Muhammad Tayyib Qasmi; Ahmed Ali Lahori
- Disciple of: Abdul Qadir Raipuri; Zakariyya Kandhlawi; Asad Madani

Zahid Hasan (1918 – 27 March 1988), known as Maulana Zahid Hasan, was an Indian Islamic scholar, spiritual guide, and a participant in the Indian independence movement. From 1946 to 1952, he served as a Member of the Legislative Assembly (MLA) representing the Deoband constituency. He graduated from Darul Uloom Deoband and was a student and disciple of Hussain Ahmad Madani. As an active member of the Jamiat Ulema-e-Hind, he worked in the religious, political, and educational spheres for nearly five decades.

== Early life and education ==
Zahid Hasan was born in 1918 in Ibrahimī village near Sarsawa, Saharanpur district, in the United Provinces of Agra and Oudh (present-day Uttar Pradesh, India). He belonged to the Khatana branch of the Gurjar community.

He received early education in Persian and Qur'anic recitation under Sayyid Sher Shah Haripuri in Sarsawa and Ahiba village near Nanauta. In 1934, he enrolled at Darul Uloom Deoband and graduated in 1941 (1360 AH).

There, he studied under scholars such as Hussain Ahmad Madani, Asghar Hussain Deobandi, Muhammad Ibrahim Balyawi, and Muhammad Shafi Deobandi.

After graduation, he also studied briefly under Ahmed Ali Lahori.

== Career ==
=== Teaching ===
Hasan began his teaching career at Madrasa Sirajul Uloom in Damjhera, Saharanpur. In 1964, he founded another branch of the madrasa in the same village, where he taught Arabic, Persian, and Islamic texts including Mishkat al-Masabih. He ended his formal teaching activities after 1978 due to growing public responsibilities.

He also served as a lifelong patron of Jamia Ahmadul Uloom in Khanpur, Gangoh.

=== Sufism ===
After graduating, Hasan pledged allegiance to Hussain Ahmad Madani and later to Abdul Qadir Raipuri, from whom he received spiritual succession (khilafah). He also received permission to guide disciples from Muhammad Zakariya Kandhlawi and Asad Madni.

=== Public service and politics ===
Hasan was associated with the Jamiat Ulema-e-Hind for over four decades, serving as vice president and later as president of its Saharanpur branch. He established a local Shariah council in Saharanpur to address community issues.

In the 1946 Indian provincial elections, he was elected as an MLA from Deoband as a candidate of the Indian National Congress. He also contested parliamentary elections in 1977 and 1980, but was not elected.

Through his efforts, over forty Islamic seminaries (madrasas) were established in the region.

== Honours ==
In 2023, a girls' school named Maulana Zahid Hasan Girls Inter College was established in Gangoh by Jamia Ahmadul Uloom Khanpur in his memory.

== Death ==
Hasan died on 27 March 1988 (8 Sha'ban 1408 AH) after sustaining a serious head injury from a fall while returning from an educational tour near his native village, Ibrahimī. He was taken to the Civil Hospital in Saharanpur but did not survive.

He was buried in the family graveyard in his home village. He was survived by two daughters and five sons, including Muhammad Arif Qasmi, Muhammad Tayyib Qasmi, Muhammad Ashfaq Qasmi, Muhammad Sajid Zahidi, and Muhammad Asjad Husaini Qasmi.
