= Muhammad Sarfaraz Khan Safdar =

Pakistani islamic scholar (1914–2009)

Sheikh al-Hadith Muhammad Sarfaraz Khan Safdar
- محمد سرفراز خان صفدر

Personal life
- Born: 1914 Mansehra, NWFP, British India
- Died: 5 May 2009 (aged 94–95)
- Children: Zahid Ur Rashdi
- Parent: Nur Ahmad Khan (father)
- Main interest(s): Hadith; Tafsir; Sufism
- Education: Darul Uloom Deoband
- Relations: Abdul Hameed Swati (brother)

Religious life
- Religion: Islam
- Denomination: Sunni
- Institute: Jamia Nusrat Ul Uloom Gujranwala
- Movement: Deobandi
- Profession: Islamic scholar

Muhammad Sarfaraz Khan Safdar (Urdu: محمد سرفراز خان صفدر; born; 1914 – 5 May 2009) was a Pakistani Deobandi Islamic scholar.

== Early life and education ==
Sarfaraz Khan Safdar studied first with Ghulam Ghaus Hazarvi in his hometown. In 1939 he traveled to Darul Uloom Deoband with his brother Sufi Abdul Hameed Swati and studied ahadith under Hussain Ahmad Madani.

== Honorary titles ==
- 'Safdar' or 'Saf-dar' – Derived from Arabic, mean; "the one who breaks the row/queue". It was given by Hussain Ahmad Madani
- 'Imam Ahl al-Sunnah' (the Imam of the Ahl al-Sunnah), given by Ahmad al-Rahman, Mufti Wali Hasan Tonki, Muhammad Yusuf Ludhianvi, Nizamuddin Shamzai, Muhammad Jamil Khan, Zar Wali Khan, Mufti Muhammad Naeem and Muhammad Aslam Sheikhupuri.

== Literary works ==
Safdar’s books include:

- Al-Kalam al-Mufeed fi Asbatit al-Taqleed
- Al-Minhāj Al-Vāz̤iḥ 2009
- Tawdih al-Maram fil Nuzul al-Masih (AS)
- Al-Kalam al-Havi fi Tahqiq ‘Ibarah al-Tahawi
- Al Maslak Al Mansoor Fi Kitabil Mastoor
- Itmam Ul Burhan
- Rah-e-Hidayat
- Irshad Ush Shia
- Eesaiyat Ka Pas e Manzar
- Hukm az Zikr bil Jahr
- Al Shihab al Mubeen
- Ibaraat-e-Akabir
