= Abdul Bari Nadvi =

Indian Muslim scholar (1886–1976)

Abdul Bari Nadvi (1886 – 30 January 1976) was an Indian Muslim scholar born in the Barabanki district near Lucknow, Uttar Pradesh, India. His father Hakim Abdul Khaliq was a student of Maulana Mohammad Naeem Farangi Mahli. His younger brother Saad-ud-Din Ansari was among the founding members of the Jamia Millia Delhi and taught there for a long time. Abdul Bari Nadvi died in Lucknow in 1976. He was survived by four sons and two daughters, all of whom are now deceased.

== Education and Career ==
After his early education at a local madrasah he went to Nadwa-tul-Ulama for his higher education. He was well reputed as an academic and an established writer in the disciplines of philosophy and theology. He taught at Gujarat College in Ahmedabad, Dakkan College in Pune, and Osmania University in Hyderabad from where he retired as professor, having earlier served as Head of the Philosophy Department. He was one of the most capable students of Allama Shibli Nomani and a contemporary of Syed Sulaiman Nadvi, Abdul Salam Nadvi, Abdul Majid Daryabadi, and Manazir Ahsan Gilani. He wrote extensively on modern philosophy and religion and translated the works of numerous western philosophers and sociologists such as George Berkeley, David Hume, René Descartes, John Dewey, Henri Bergson, William James, G. F. Stout, and John S. Mackenzie. Some of his works were included in the undergraduate and postgraduate curriculum at Osmania University.

He was influenced in his religious and political ideology by Maulana Ashraf Ali Thanwi and Maulana Hussain Ahmed Madani, both being students of Sheikh-ul-Hind Maulana Mahmud Hasan Deobandi of the Deobandi movement. His formal spiritual association (bay'at) was with Maulana Madni, but he spent more time with Maulana Thanwi who greatly influenced his religious orientation.

== Philosophical Approach and Orientation ==
Nadwa group photo, 1912. Abdul Bari Nadvi standing fourth from right

Maulana Nadvi was entirely educated in Muslim seminaries in India and never studied at a (secular/modern) college or university. He self-taught Aristotelian logic (and Muslim additions and commentary to it), and was exposed to Muslim critics of Aristotelian logic such as Ibn Taymiyya among others. He also learnt Neo-Platonic Muslim philosophy mainly through the works of Mulla Sadra and through the study of Ilm al Kalam (Muslim theology). He was also exposed to the basic ideas of Aristotle's philosophy especially his Metaphysics. Today, modern philosophy is not taught in Muslim seminaries in India and Pakistan (with some exceptions). Nadvi taught himself not only English (with support of his teacher Shibli Nomani who arranged a scholarship for him) but also philosophy purely out of self-interest.

His writings on philosophy and religion, and especially on topics arising from the interaction between philosophy and religion in the Islamic context were informed by his religious orientation, influenced by Shibli, Thanwi and Madani. Two of his books from this period stand out, relating to religion and rationality as well as religion and science. He also wrote a chapter on miracles in Shibli Nomani/Sulaiman Nadvi's multiple-volume biography of Muhammad in which he mainly drew on Hume's ideas to establish the rationality or possibility of miracles.

== Written Works ==
Some of his books and written pieces include:

Translations from English to Urdu

- Principles of Human Knowledge (George Berkeley) - translated into Urdu in 1919, Dakkan College Poona
- Manual of Ethics (John S Mackenzie) - translated into Urdu in 1923, Usmania University Hyderabad
- Manual of Psychology (G. F. Stout) - translated into Urdu in 1927, Usmania University Hyderabad
- Introduction to Metaphysics (Henri Bergson) - translated into Urdu in 1931, Usmania University Hyderabad
- Ethics (John Dewey and James Tufts) - translated into Urdu in 1932, Usmania University Hyderabad
- Discourse on Methods and Meditations on First Philosophy (René Descartes) - translated into Urdu in 1932, Usmania University Hyderabad
- William James, some writings from 1902 to 1910 - translated into Urdu in 1937, Usmania University Hyderabad
- Human Understanding (David Hume) - translated into Urdu in 1938, Usmania University Hyderabad

Urdu Books and Writings

- برکلے اور اس کا فلسفہ - 1918, Dakkan College Poona
- 1920 - معجزات انبیا اور عقلیات جدیدہ - Chapter written in Allama Shibli Nomani/Sulaiman Nadvi's Seerat-ul-Nabi
- 1924 - مذہب اور عقلیات – Lecture delivered in Mohammadan Education Conference in Surat/Gujrat, India
- تجدید تعلیم و تبلیغ – 1948
- تجدید تصوف و سلوک – 1949
- تجدید معاشیات – 1955
- تجدید دین کامل – 1956
- نظام صلاح و اصلاح – 1962
- 1970 - مذہب اور سائنس

Arabic Books

- بین التصوف والحیات, published in Damascus and Istanbul
- الدین والعلوم العقلیہ, published in India
- المنھج السلامی لتربیت النفس, published in India

== See more ==
- List of Deobandis
