= Government Nizamia Tibbi College =

Unani medicine college in Hyderabad, Telangana, India

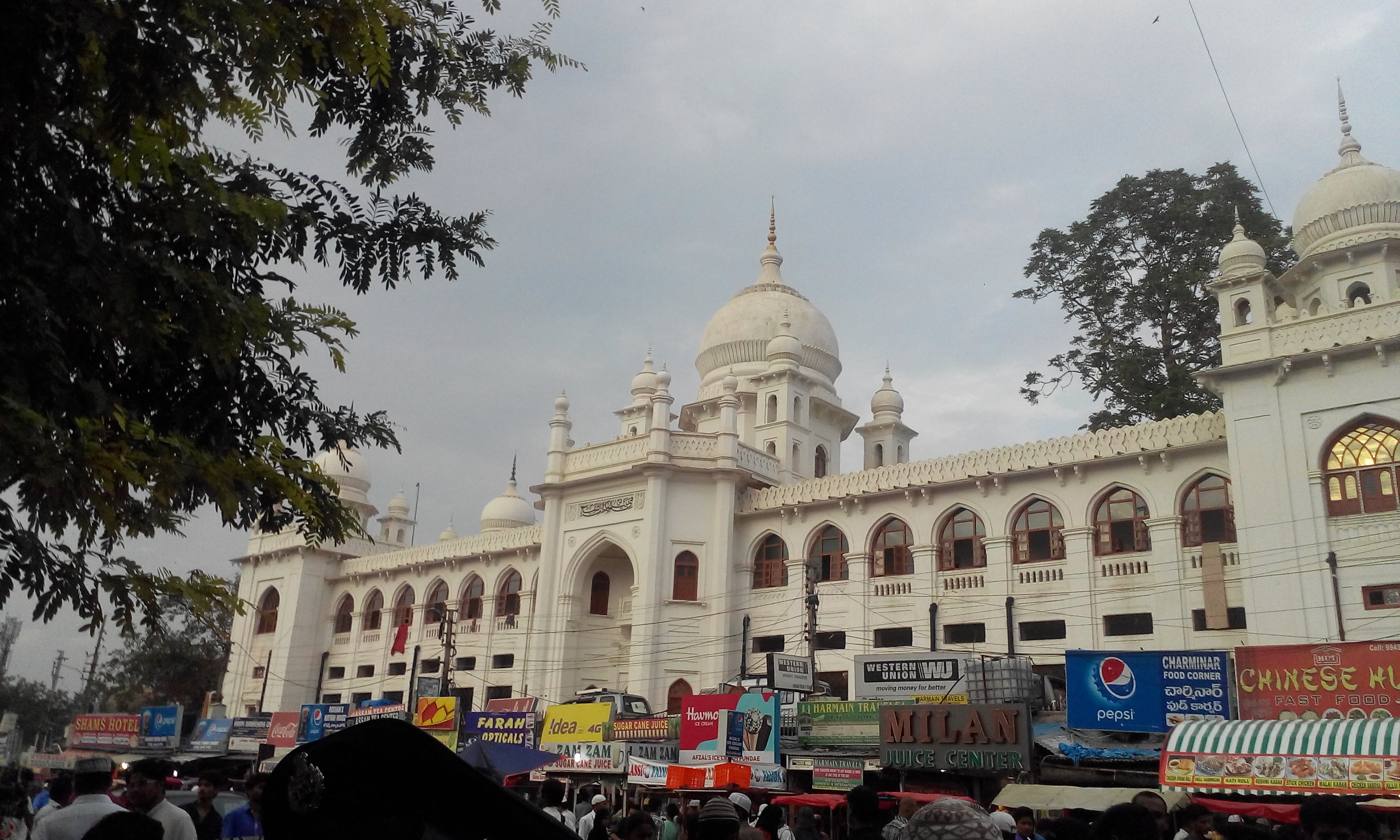
- Type: Unani Medical College
- Established: 1810
- Location: Hyderabad, Kotla Alijah, Moghalpura, Hyderabad, Hyderabad, Telangana, 500002, India; 17.3605319°N 78.4750474°E
- Campus: Near Charminar
- Location within Hyderabad Location within Telangana Location within India

Government Nizamia Tibbi College is a unani medicine college located in Hyderabad, Telangana, India.

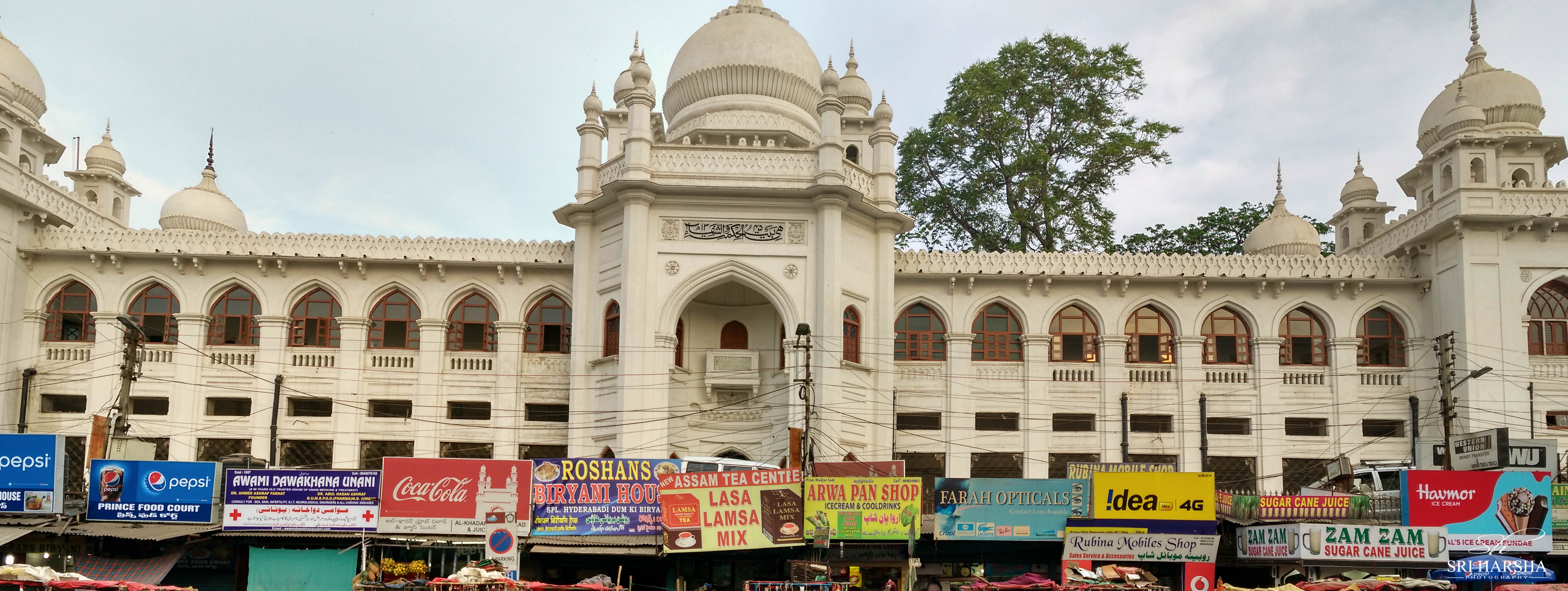
Nizamia Tibbi College at Charminar

There is a college which is a substitution of the hospital. Most of the medicines prepared for treatment which made from medicinal herbs. The college offers one bachelor's course i.e., BUMS Bachelor of unani medicine and surgery. Apart from which, the college also offers MD courses for post graduation.

== History ==
The college has history dating back to 1810. It was started by an Afghan scholar, Sajida Begum Majid. Later, it was renovated and developed in 1938 by the seventh Nizam, Mir Osman Ali Khan.

== The College ==
Government Nizamia Tibbi College is located at Charminar, Hyderabad. The college is affiliated to KNR University of Health Sciences, Telangana, India.

== Programmes ==
The main undergraduate course offered at the college is BUMS (Bachelor of Unani Medicine and Surgery) course. In addition the college also offers Postgraduate (MD) course.

== See also ==
- Education in India
- Literacy in India
- List of institutions of higher education in Telangana
- Aligarh Muslim University
