= Muhammad Hassan (scholar) =

Pakistani Islamic scholar

Mufti Muhammad Hassan
- مفتی محمد حسن

Personal life
- Born: 1880 Milpur, Hasan Abdal, British India
- Died: 1 June 1961 (aged 80–81) Karachi
- Children: Fazle Rahim Ashrafi
- Education: Darul Uloom Deoband

Religious life
- Religion: Islam
- Founder of: Jamia Ashrafia
- Profession: Islamic scholar

Muslim leader
- Teacher: Ashraf Ali Thanwi; Anwar Shah Kashmiri

Muhammad Hassan (1880 - 1 June 1961) was a Pakistani Islamic scholar and founder of Jamia Ashrafia. He was educated at Darul Uloom Deoband. He was a student of Ashraf Ali Thanwi and Anwar Shah Kashmiri.

== Life ==
Hassan was born in 1880 in British India in the town of Milpur on the outskirts of Hasan Abdal, to Maulana Allah Dad, a pious family of the Utmanzai tribe of Pathans. His father was a religious scholar. He received his early education in his hometown. After receiving further religious education from Muhammad Masoom, Abdul Jabbar Ghaznavi, Noor Muhammad and Ghulam Mustafa Qasmi and other scholars, he went to Ashraf Ali Thanwi for self-purification and training. Hassan received his certificate of Tajwid and Art of Recitation from Karim Bakhsh and graduated from Darul Uloom Deoband by renewing the Hadith study from Anwar Shah Kashmiri.

Hassan supported the establishment of Pakistan and the end of British rule. He had a corrective relationship with Ashraf Ali Thanwi, a and spiritual figure. In 1947, he established a religious institution in Lahore called Jamia Ashrafia under the name of Ashraf Ali Thanwi.

== Death and legacy ==
Hassan died on 1 June 1961 in Karachi after a long illness. Funeral prayers were offered by Maulana Shah Abdul Ghani and he was buried in the Society Cemetery in Karachi.

Apart from the scholars of their time, former Prime Minister of Pakistan, Chaudhry Muhammad Ali, Sardar Abdur Rabb Nishtar and other governors, ministers and officials took pride in attending the Hassan's meetings. Islamic historians Syed Sulaiman Nadvi and Abdul Majid Daryabadi were also associated with the footsteps of Muhammad Hassan.

He is survived by his son, Fazle Rahim Ashrafi, who is the current principal of Jamia Ashrafia.

== See also ==
- List of Deobandis
