= Abdullah Abbas Nadwi =

Islamic scholar

Personal life
- Born: 25 December 1925
- Died: 1 January 2006 (aged 80)
- Main interest(s): Quranic studies, Arabic language
- Notable work(s): Vocabulary of the Holy Qur'an (1983), Learn the Language of the Holy Qur'an (1987)
- Occupation: Islamic scholar, author, teacher

Religious life
- Religion: Islam
- Denomination: Sunni
- Jurisprudence: Hanafi
- Movement: Deobandi

Abdullah Abbas Nadwi (25 December 1925 – 1 January 2006) was an Indian Islamic scholar.

He was the author of the Vocabulary of the Holy Qur'an (1983, ISBN 1-56316-115-X). The entries are supplied with examples from Qur'an, searchable by 3-letter roots. He also authored Learn the Language of the Holy Qur'an (1987, ISBN 1-56316-009-9).

He was a prominent teacher of Darul Uloom Nadwatul Ulama. He also served in Jamia Ummul Qura University in Makkah as a teacher for several years.
