= Shihabuddin Nadvi =

Indian Islamic scholar and philosopher

- Born: Mohammed Shihabuddin Nadvi; 12 November 1931; Bangalore
- Died: 18 April 2002 (aged 70); India
- Resting place: Bangalore
- Occupations: Writer, scholar
- Known for: Islamic philosophy
- Title: Sheikh Shihab Nadvi

Mohammed Shihabuddin Nadvi (1931–2002) was an Indian Islamic scholastic philosopher, religious reformer and writer. He was born in the city of Bangalore on 12 November 1931 and wrote more than 100 books on the Qur'an, Hadith and modern science. He also founded Furqania Academy Trust as a center for research on Qur'anic sciences in Bangalore in 1970. Some scholars regard him as Mujaddid; a religious revivalist. He died on 18 April 2002.

== Major works ==
His books include:

- Evolution or Creation?
- The Holy Qur'an and Biology
- The Holy Qur'an Natural World
- Cloning Testifies Resurrection
- Qur'anic Code of Argumentation
- Qur'anic Concept of Knowledge
- Death of the Sun and the Doomsday
- Qur'an, Science and the Muslims
- Moon Sighting and Astronomical Calculations
- Rise and Fall of Muslims in Science
- Need to Institutionalize Zakat
