= Syed Ehtisham Ahmed Nadvi =

Syed Ehtisham Ahmed Nadvi (also known as S. E. A. Nadvi) is a scholar of the Arabic language and Islamic studies, specialising in Arabic literary criticism. He is the winner of the 1992 President's Award for Literature, and the author of books on Arabic, Urdu and Persian literature, including course books taught in Indian universities.

== Early life and education ==
Syed Ehtisham Ahmed Nadvi was born in the village of Makhdoompur in Amethi, Uttar Pradesh, India, into a well known family of Indian Muslim intelligentsia belonging to the Syed-Qidwai clan. Other members of this clan include Ali Mian.

Nadvi graduated from the Darul-uloom Nadwatul Ulama in Lucknow. He obtained his master's degree in Arabic from the Aligarh Muslim University, and subsequently his PhD from the same institution.

Nadvi was the Head of the Arabic Department at the University of Calicut, Kerala, and retired in 2000. During his tenure, he supervised the PhD theses of some notable scholars such as Bahauddeen Muhammed Jamaluddeen Nadwi. A festschrift in his honour appeared in 2003.
