= Ahmed Ali Lahori =

Pakistani Sufi (1887-1962)

Ahmed Ali Lahori احمد علی لاہوری

Ameer of Jamiat Ulema-e-Islam
- In office 1956–1962
- Preceded by: Zafar Ahmad Usmani
- Succeeded by: Abdullah Darkhawasti

Personal life
- Born: 1887 Gujranwala District, Punjab, British India
- Died: 23 February 1962 (aged 74–75) Lahore, West Pakistan, Pakistan
- Occupation: Islamic scholar, Quran interpreter

Religious life
- Religion: Islam

Muslim leader
- Students: Oliur Rahman Shamsuddin Qasemi

Ahmed Ali Lahori (1887 – 23 February 1962) (Urdu: مولانا احمد علی لاہوری) was a Pakistani Muslim scholar, Quran interpreter and Ameer of the Jamiat Ulema-e-Islam in West Pakistan. His students include Abul Hasan Ali Nadwi.

== Early life and career ==
Ahmed Ali Lahori was a student of Ubaidullah Sindhi. He studied Islamic studies and graduated in 1927.

Ahmed Ali Lahori was employed as a lecturer at his teacher's institute and also married his teacher's daughter. He also helped him in organizing new groups. However, Ubaidullah Sindhi died in 1944 before the 1947 partition of India. So Maulana Shabbir Ahmad Usmani led a group of Deobandi scholars including Ahmed Ali Lahori to support the demand for Pakistan movement and Muhammad Ali Jinnah. Therefore, this whole group came over to newly created Pakistan in 1947 and settled here.

Lahori taught the Quran in Lahore for 40 years. He and Hakeem Ferozuddin founded the Anjuman-e-Khuddam-e-Din in 1922 to be able to publish Islam-related books and magazines from Lahore. In addition, Madressah Qasim-ul-Uloom was established where opening ceremony was performed by Maulana Shabbir Ahmad Usmani. Due to Lahori's untiring efforts, Islamic awareness and teachings were spread among the people of Lahore.

Lahori was also elected Vice-President of Anjuman-i-Himayat-i-Islam in 1956. He was an active participant in 1956 on behalf of Majlis-e-Tahaffuz-e-Khatme Nabuwwat as well.

He was arrested, along with other Silk Letter Movement activists, by the British rulers and jailed.

In October 1956, Ahmed Ali Lahori was elected Amir (Head) of Jamiat Ulema-e-Islam, West Pakistan by consensus. Within a year, 300 branch offices of this party were established under his leadership.

== Death and survivors ==
Ahmed Ali Lahori died in Lahore, Pakistan on 23 February 1962 and was buried in Miani Sahib Graveyard. His son Ubaidullah Anwar also was an Islamic scholar who arranged and conducted his funeral prayers on the day after his death.

== See more ==
- List of Deobandis
