= Jamia Ashrafia =

Religious seminary in Lahore, Pakistan

Ashrafia Islamic University
- جامعہ اشرفیہ - Jamia Ashrafia
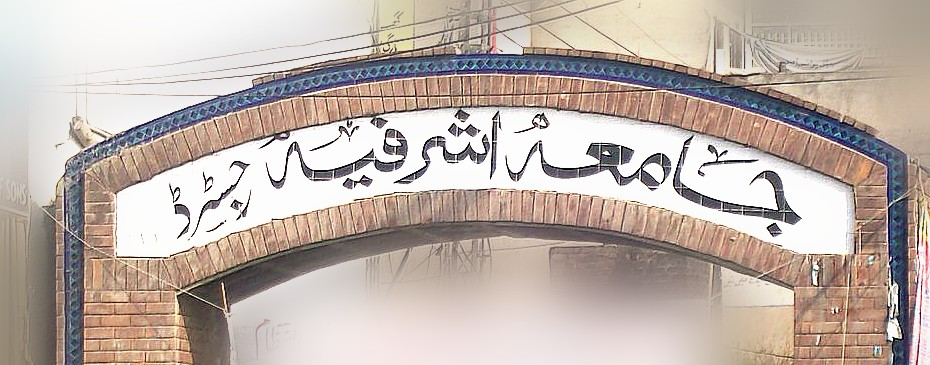
- Established: 1947
- Founder: Mufti Muhammad Hassan
- Religious affiliation: Darul Uloom Deoband
- Academic affiliations: Wifaq ul Madaris
- Principal: Qari Arshad Ubaid
- Students: Over 2000
- Location: Lahore, Punjab, Pakistan
- Campus: Urban
- Website: jamiaashrafia.org

Jamia Ashrafia (جامعہ اشرفیہ, Ashrafia Islamic University), Lahore, Pakistan, is a religious educational institution founded by Mufti Muhammad Hassan in 1947. The university has produced numerous scholars of Islam, serving various sectors of life.

== History ==
The school was founded on 14 September 1947, just a month after the Partition of India which created Pakistan. Muhammad Hasan Amritsari named the university for Deobandi scholar Ashraf Ali Thanwi, in recognition of his support for the creation of an independent homeland for British India's Muslims.

It was founded in a quadrangular three-storied building in Nila Gumbad Anarkali at the centre of the thickly populated area of Lahore. 120 kanals of land between Canal Road and Ferozepur Road were purchased on 28 March 1955, and construction of a new school building began with the laying of the foundation stone of a mosque. In 1957 the majority of staff and students shifted to the new campus, and teaching of hadith courses began under the famous scholar Muhammad Idris Kandhlawi in 1958.

Today the main campus comprises a mosque, a large administrative and teaching block, two boarding houses (one for local students and one for foreign), a hospital, and residences for faculty and employees.

== Leadership ==
Mufti Muhammad Hassan died on 1 June 1961. His sons, Mufti Muhammad Ubaidullah (late), Maulana Abd-ur-Rahman Ashrafi (late), Maulana Fazl-ur-Raheem, and Mufti Hasan's grandson Maulana Hafiz Ajwad Ubaid manage the university matters.

== Branches ==
The ain branch of Jamia Ashrafia is located on Ferozpur Road, Lahore. It has a number of other branches.

- Madrisatul Faisal Lil Bannat at Model Town, Lahore (main women's branch)
- Madrisa Ashrafia at Old Anarkali, Lahore
- Mahad al-Quba at Johr Town, Lahore
- Madrisa Baitul Quran at Samanabad, Lahore
- Iqra Badrul Atfaal at Allama Iqbal Town, Lahore
- Ahsanul Makatib at Gujjar Pura, Lahore
- Madrisatul Hassan at Bedian Road, Lahore
- Madrisa Sadiq at Raiwind Road, Lahore
- Madrisa Ashrafia lil Bannat at Garden Town, Lahore
- Madrisa Abdullah bin Zubair at Gulshan-e-Ravi, Lahore
- Madrisatul Hassan at Hassan Abdal, Rawalpindi

== Alumni ==
Alumni include:

- Harun Islamabadi
- Hafez Ahmadullah
