= List of Darul Uloom Haqqania alumni =

Darul Uloom Haqqania is an Islamic seminary located in Akora Khattak, Khyber Pakhtunkhwa, Pakistan. Founded in 1947, it is one of the largest and most prominent Islamic educational institutions in South Asia. The madrasa follows the Deobandi school of thought and has produced numerous notable alumni who have made significant contributions in various fields. This list presents some of the well-known alumni of Darul Uloom Haqqania.

== Alumni ==
Name	Introduction	Ref
Maulana Fazal-ur-Rehman	He is a prominent Pakistani politician, president of Jamiat Ulema-e-Islam (F), who has served in various state-level positions including Leader of the Opposition and member of the National Assembly several times.	
Abdul Hakim Haqqani	Afghan Islamic scholar, writer, former Chief Justice of Afghanistan and Minister of Justice since 2021.	
Shahabuddin Delawar	Afghan Taliban leader, Islamic scholar, former Afghanistan Ambassador to Saudi Arabia and Minister of Minerals and Petroleum since 2021.	
Hamid Ul Haq Haqqani	Pakistani politician, Islamic scholar, former member of the National Assembly of Pakistan and chief of the Jamiat Ulema-e-Islam (S) party.	
Jalaluddin Haqqani	He was an Afghan insurgent commander and founder Haqqani network.	
Sardar Ali Haqqani	aka "Tawajju Ustaad", a Pakistani Islamic scholar, was known on social media for his bold speeches in Pashto.	
Sirajuddin Haqqani	Afghan Taliban and Haqqani network leader, first deputy leader of Afghanistan and the acting interior minister.	
Azizur Rahman Hazarvi	Pakistani Islamic Scholar, a senior leader of Jamiat Ulema-e-Islam (F) and founder of Darul Uloom Zakaria in Islamabad. He was the authorized disciple of Zakariyya Kandhlawi.	
Shaikh Idrees	Sheikh al-Hadith at Jamia Nomania and Darul Uloom Haqqania, former member of the Khyber Pakhtunkhwa Assembly	
Hasan Jan	Pakistani Islamic scholar, a former member of the National Assembly of Pakistan and Sheikh al-Hadith at Darwesh Masjid in Peshawar. He was also the vice president of Wifaq ul Madaris Al-Arabia, Pakistan.	
Mohammad Yunus Khalis	A mujahideen commander of Hezb-i-Islami in Afghanistan during the Soviet–Afghan War.	
Akhtar Mansour	Taliban's second supreme leader.	
Zabihullah Mujahid	Afghan Taliban official serving as the Central spokesman for the Islamic Emirate of Afghanistan and Deputy Ministry of Information and Culture 2021.	
Amir Khan Muttaqi	Afghan Taliban politician and acting Minister of Foreign Affairs of the Islamic Emirate of Afghanistan 2021.	
Naeem Wardak	The head of the Afghan Embassy in Qatar since 2021 and a spokesman of the Taliban's Political Office since 2020.	
Muhammad Musa Ruhani Bazi	He was a Pakistani Islamic philosopher, author, scholar, imam, commentator of hadith, astronomer, and jurist.	
Sami-ul-Haq	He was a Pakistani religious scholar and Member of the Senate of Pakistan.	
Noor Mohammad Saqib	He was the Minister of Hajj and Awqaf, and chief justice of the Supreme Court in Afghanistan.	
Syed Sher Ali Shah	Former Sheikh al-Hadith of Darul Uloom Haqqania	
Sheikh Rahimullah Haqqani	Afghan Taliban Islamic scholar and director of Afghan Madrasas and principal at Madrasah Zubaria in Peshawar.	
Asim Umar	He was the leader of al-Qaeda in the Indian subcontinent.	
Muhammad Saleh Shah	Pakistani Politician, Islamic scholar and former member of Senate of Pakistan.	
