= Ghulam Ur Rehman =

Pakistani Islamic scholar

Mufti Ghulam Ur Rehman
- مفتی غلام الرحمن

Personal life
- Born: 13 August 1954 (age 71) Belian, Mansehra District, Khyber Pakhtunkhwa, Pakistan
- Home town: Mansehra
- Children: Ihsan Ur Rahman Usmani
- Political party: Jamiat Ulema-e-Islam (F)
- Education: University of Peshawar; Allama Iqbal Open University; Al-Azhar University

Religious life
- Religion: Islam
- Denomination: Sunni
- Institute: Jamia Usmania Peshawar; Wifaq ul Madaris; Institute of Policy Studies; Darul Uloom Haqqania; Bank of Khyber
- Founder of: Jamia Usmania Peshawar

1st Muhtamim (principal) of Jamia Usmania Peshawar
- Incumbent
- Assumed office 1992
- Preceded by: None (office created)

Mufti Ghulam Ur Rehman (Urdu: مفتی غلام الرحمن) is a Pakistani religious scholar. He is the founder and the first principal of Jamia Usmania Peshawar, a position he has held since 1992. He has served as the Chairman of the Nifaz-i-Sharia Council (NSC) from 2002 to 2007 and chairman of Higher Education Commission Khyber Pakhtunkhwa.

== Early life and education ==
Ghulam Ur Rehman was born on 13 August 1954 in Belian, in Mansehra District, Khyber Pakhtunkhwa. He received his primary education at a government primary school in Belian and memorized the Qur’an in 1969 under Qari Ghulam Habib. He later pursued religious studies at Jamia Faruqia, Rawalpindi, and completed advanced studies at Darul Uloom Haqqania, Akora Khattak, where he studied for six years under several prominent scholars. In 1977, he placed third nationally in Hadith in the annual examinations conducted by the Federation of Madrassas Al-Arabia, Pakistan. Alongside religious education, he completed contemporary academic studies, obtaining matriculation in 1973, a bachelor’s degree from the University of Peshawar in 1980, a master’s degree in 1986, and an MPhil degree from Allama Iqbal Open University in 1996. He later attended the Daurah Tadrees at Al-Azhar University in Egypt.

== Academic career ==
After completing his studies at Darul Uloom Haqqania in 1977, he began teaching at Jamia Haqqania at the invitation of Shaykh al-Hadith Maulana Abdul Haq. During his tenure there, he served in several administrative and academic roles, including Director of Education, Deputy Mufti, Supervisor of the Department of Islamic Jurisprudence, and head of the Dar al-Ifta (fatwa department). A large number of students of Qur’an and Sunnah studied under him. In 1994, he founded Jamia Usmania in Peshawar and later moved there from Jamia Haqqania. Jamia Usmania subsequently developed into a prominent religious seminary in Pakistan, whose students regularly achieve high positions in national madrasa examinations. The institution later expanded with the establishment of the Al-Asr School System near the Usmania campus and a second branch, Gulshan-e-Umar, in Cherat Road, Khyber Pakhtunkhwa. The Gulshan-e-Umar campus includes residential facilities, a Qur’an memorization department, and a Qur’anic garden featuring plant species mentioned in the Qur’an.

He also served as a member of the National Academic Council of Institute of Policy Studies and as a member of Shariah Supervisory Board of the Bank of Khyber.

== Published works ==
Ghulam ur Rehman is the author of several Urdu-language religious works, including Difa‘-e Abu Huraira (Defense of Abu Huraira), Shari‘ah Status of Aqiqah, Hayat Baylani, From Darul Uloom Haqqania to Jamia al-Azhar (travelogue), Shar‘i Status of Test-Tube Baby, and a multi-volume collection of legal opinions (Fatawa Haqqania, 10 volumes). He has also served as editor-in-chief of the monthly journal Al-Asr.
