= Anwar-ul-Haq Haqqani =

Pakistani Islamic scholar

Sheikh al-Hadith Anwar-ul-Haq Haqqani
- مولانا انوار الحق حقانی

3rd Chancellor of Darul Uloom Haqqania
- Incumbent
- Assumed office November 2018
- Preceded by: Sami-ul-Haq

10th Vice President of Wifaq ul Madaris Al-Arabia, Pakistan
- Incumbent
- Assumed office 8 April 2009
- Preceded by: Abdur Razzaq Iskander

Personal life
- Parent: Abdul Haq Akorwi
- Education: Darul Uloom Haqqania
- Relatives: Sami-ul-Haq (Brother); Hamid Ul Haq Haqqani (nephew); Abdul Haq Sani (great-nephew)

Religious life
- Religion: Islam
- Denomination: Sunni
- Jurisprudence: Hanafi
- Movement: Deobandi

Anwar-ul-Haq Haqqani is a Pakistani Islamic scholar, who is currently serving as the chancellor of Darul Uloom Haqqania, a post he has held since November 2018 after the death of his brother Sami-ul-Haq.

He has also been serving as the vice-president of Wifaq ul Madaris Al-Arabia, Pakistan, since 8 April 2009.

He is the son of Abdul Haq Akorwi, uncle of Hamid Ul Haq Haqqani and great uncle of Abdul Haq Sani.

== See also ==
- List of Deobandis
