= Syed Sher Ali Shah =

Pakistani Islamic scholar

Sheikh-ul-Hadees Dr. Syed Sher Ali Shah Madani
- سید شیر علی شاہ مدنی
- Title: Sheikh-ul-Hadees

Personal life
- Born: 31 December 1930 Akora Khattak
- Died: 30 October 2015 (aged 84) Rehman Medical Complex Peshawar
- Parent: Maulana Qudrat Shah (father)
- Political party: Jamiat Ulema-e-Islam
- Education: Islamic University of Madinah; Darul Uloom Haqqania

Religious life
- Religion: Islam
- Denomination: Sunni
- Institute: Darul Uloom Haqqania
- Movement: Khatam an-Nabuwat

Muslim leader
- Teacher: Ahmed Ali Lahori; Abdullah Darkhawasti; Abdul Haq Akorwi
- Students: Maulana Fazal ur Rehman Jalaluddin Haqqani

Sheikh-ul-Hadees Dr. Syed Sher Ali Shah Madani (31 December 1930 – 30 November 2015) (Pashto: سید شیر علی شاہ مدنی) was a Pakistani-Pashtun Islamic scholar.

== Early life and education ==
The Sheikh began learning from home, learned the Qur’an, fundamental books in Arabic and Persian with his father (Maulana Qudrat Shah) and some books of Persian poetry from Hazrat Maulana Abdul Rahim, and "Nahw and Sarf" (Arabic Grammar) from Hazrat Maulana Qazi Habib-ur-Rehman. After that, he joined the Darul Uloom Haqqania in Akora Khattak. About three months after graduating from Darul Uloom Haqqania, he also studied from the teachers of Jamia Ashrafia Lahore, Sheikh Tafsir Maulana Muhammad Idris Kandhlawi and Hazrat Maulana Mufti Muhammad Hassan.

== Academic career ==
On 5 April 1954, he started teaching in Darul Uloom Haqqania in Akora Khattak after graduation. After 20 years of teaching, on the advice of Shaykh-ul-Hadeeth Maulana Abdul Haq Akorwi, he entered the Islamic University of Madinah in 1973 and studied in various fields for fifteen years and got his Master and Ph.D. degrees. He also continued teaching in the Masjid e Nabawi. After graduating from the Islamic University of Madinah, he was appointed as a teacher in Jamia Darul Uloom, Karachi in 1987. Later, he also taught in Mufti Zar Wali Khan's Madrasa Jamia Ahsan-ul-Uloom Gulshan-e-Iqbal Karachi and Maulana Jalaluddin Haqqani's Madrasa Manba-ul-Uloom, Miramshah. Finally, at the invitation of his longtime colleague Shaykh-ul-Hadeeth Maulana Sami-ul-Haq in 1996 he came and started teaching Hadith at Darul Uloom Haqqania.

== Death ==
He died on Friday 30 October 2013, at Rehman Medical Complex, Peshawar. And on 31 October, millions of people, scholars, shaykhs, saints and students attended the funeral and were buried beside their father.

== Published works ==
He completed his doctoral research in Medina, Saudi Arabia, where he wrote a PhD thesis devoted to the Qur’anic exegesis (tafsir) of Hasan al-Basri. He authored several works in the fields of Qur’anic studies and Islamic thought, including Makānat al-Lāhiyyāt fī al-Islām (The Status of Theology in Islam), Zubdat al-Qurʾān (The Quintessence of the Qur’an), Hawla Ḥarakat al-Ṭālibān (On the Taliban Movement), Zād al-Manthī: Sharḥ al-Tirmidhī (Provisions for the Weary: A Commentary on al-Tirmidhī), and Tafsīr Sūrat al-Kahf (Commentary on Surah al-Kahf).
