= 2025 Darul Uloom Haqqania bombing =

Terrorist attack in Pakistan

- Part of Insurgency in Khyber Pakhtunkhwa
- Interior of the seminary after attack

- Darul Uloom Haqqania (Pakistan)
- Location: 34°00′00″N 72°07′17″E; Darul Uloom Haqqania seminary, Akora Khattak, Nowshera District, Khyber Pakhtunkhwa, Pakistan
- Date: 28 February 2025; 14:00 (PKT)
- Target: Hamid Ul Haq Haqqani
- Attack type: Suicide bombing
- Weapon: Explosive belt
- Deaths: 8 (including the perpetrator)
- Injuries: 20
- Perpetrator: Islamic State – Khorasan Province (suspected)

On 28 February 2025, a suicide bombing targeted the Darul Uloom Haqqania seminary in Akora Khattak, Nowshera District, Khyber Pakhtunkhwa, Pakistan. The attack occurred during Friday prayers, claiming the lives of at least eight individuals, including the seminary's head and prominent cleric Hamid Ul Haq Haqqani, while injuring approximately 20 others including Abdul Haq Sani Haqqani.

== Background ==
Maulana Hamidul Haq Haqqani, born on 26 May 1968, was an Islamic scholar and politician. He served as a member of Pakistan's National Assembly from 2002 to 2007 and led the Jamiat Ulema-e-Islam (S) party following the assassination of his father Maulana Sami-ul-Haq, in 2018. The Darul Uloom Haqqania seminary, the second largest Islamic seminary in Pakistan, is renowned for its historical significance and its role in educating many Afghan Taliban leaders. The institution has been a focal point in regional religious and political dynamics.

== Bombing ==
The attack occurred following Friday prayers at a mosque inside the Darul Uloom Haqqania compound. The attacker was believed to have entered the building through a side gate and walked up to Haq while prayers were being offered. At least eight people, including Hamid Ul Haq Haqqani, who was leaving the mosque, and six worshippers, were killed while dozens were injured, including three police officers tasked with guarding the compound. Three people were in critical condition, while an Afghan national was also among the fatalities. Prominent cleric and leader of Jamiat Ulema-e-Islam (S), Hamid Ul Haq Haqqani, was killed during the bombing at the age of 56, while his son and successor, Abdul Haq Sani Haqqani, was injured during it.

== Aftermath ==
The bombing occurred on the final day of the madrassa students' academic year, and just before the commencement of the holy month of Ramadan, a period traditionally marked by heightened religious observances. The attack was condemned by President Asif Ali Zardari, Prime Minister Shehbaz Sharif and other national leaders. Both the Afghan and Pakistani Taliban also condemned the attack, while Haqqani's family appealed to his followers to remain peaceful. The Afghan interior ministry blamed the attack on Islamic State, with suspicions falling on Islamic State – Khorasan Province.

No group immediately claimed responsibility for the attack. Authorities initiated an investigation to identify and apprehend those responsible. Authorities issued a photo of the alleged suicide bomber and offered a reward of 500,000 rupees ($1,787) for information regarding him.

Up to two other bombings occurred simultaneously in Pakistan on the same day. One of those bombings targeted a busy marketplace in Orakzai District, also one occurred in Khyber Pakhtunkhwa.

Haqqani's funeral was held at the main hall of Darul Uloom Haqqania on 1 March, with thousands in attendance amid heavy security provided by police and students.

== Reactions ==
The Islamic Emirate of Afghanistan sent condolences and condemned the violence, stressing the importance of the safety of scholars in the region and putting emphasis on the loss of an important scholar.

The Consulate General of the Islamic Republic of Iran in Peshawar issued a press release condemning the attack and expressing condolences, as well as reiterating the stance of the Iranian government that continuous bilateral and regional cooperation is needed to effectively combat the threat of terrorism.

Mushtaq Ahmad Khan, a former senator of Pakistan, commented on the incident: "This is a horrific act of terrorism. It highlights the failure of both provincial and central governments and proves that security and intelligence agencies have completely failed. Where are the institutions responsible for ensuring security? Our demand is that security must be ensured in Khyber Pakhtunkhwa."

== See also ==
- Terrorist incidents in Pakistan in 2025
- 2025 in Pakistan
