= Hasan Jan =

Pakistani Sunni Muslim Scholar

Sheikh al-Hadith Mawlana Hasan Jan SS, GM

Member of the National Assembly of Pakistan
- In office 1988–1990
- Constituency: NA-5

8th Vice President of Wifaq ul Madaris Al-Arabia, Pakistan
- In office 2 March 1998 – 13 September 2017
- Preceded by: Muhammad Hanif Jalandhari
- Succeeded by: Abdur Razzaq Iskander

Personal life
- Born: 6 January 1938 Prang, Charsadda
- Died: 17 September 2007 (aged 69)
- Cause of death: assassination
- Political party: Jamiat Ulema-e-Islam (JUI)
- Education: Jamia Ashrafia; Islamic University of Madinah; Darul Uloom Haqqania; University of Peshawar
- Occupation: Islamic scholar and Politician

Religious life
- Religion: Islam
- Denomination: Sunni

Muslim leader
- Teacher: Muhammad Idris Kandhlawi; Muhammad Rasul Khan Hazarvi
- Students: Maulana Fazal-ur-Rehman Shuja ul Mulk
- Awards: Sitara-e-Shujaat; Gold medal (MA-Islamiat)

Hassan Jan Madani (Pashto:مولانا حسن جان مدنی) was a Pakistani Islamic scholar and politician who was born on 6 January 1938 in Prang, Charsadda. He had served as a member of the 8th National Assembly of Pakistan from 30 November 1988 to 6 August 1990.

He was Shaikhul-Hadith at Darwesh Masjid in Peshawar and used to deliver Friday sermons at the same mosque. He was also the vice president of Wifaqul-Madaras, the largest board of Islamic universities (Jamiat).

He was assassinated in Peshawar on 17 September 2007.

== Education ==
Hasan Jan memorized the Quran in the Masjid-e-Nabavi in three months. He studied basic mathematics and Arabic grammar from his uncle. He later got admission at Anjuman Taleem-ul-Quran where he learnt basic Urdu and Islamiat. He then moved to Darul-uloom Utmanzai where he completed Dars-e-Nizami. After Dars-e-Nizami, he moved to Jamia Ashrafia Lahore, where he studied Hadith books from Muhammad Idris Kandhlawi and Maulana Muhammad Rasool Khan Hazarvi. He got degree of Fazal-e-Deniat from Darul Uloom Haqqania with distinction. On 11 June 1962 he moved to Madina for further studies at The Islamic University of al-Madinah al-Munawarah. He was awarded gold medal by the University of Peshawar in MA Islamiat for his distinction.

== Politics ==
Hasan Jan was not a politician however he supported Jamiat Ulema-e-Islam. He was the teacher of Fazal-ur-Rehman. He contested the 1990 elections and defeated the then Awami National Party leader Abdul Wali Khan in his stronghold. He served as MNA for some time.

== Assassination ==
On Saturday 17 September 2007 some unknown people came to him near Aftari time and requested him to go with them for Nikah-Khwani. He was assassinated at Wazir Bagh behind Janaz Ga (Funeral Prayer place) in the suburbs of Peshawar. It is believed that he was killed by the unknown persons may be for his moderate views, which included issuing fatwas against suicide bombings.

== See also ==
- List of Deobandis
