= Hamdullah Jan =

Pakistani Islamic scholar and politician (1926–2019)

Maulana Hamdullah Jan Dagai
- مولانا حمد اللہ جان

Personal life
- Born: Dagai village in Swabi District
- Died: 12 January 2019 (aged 110)
- Children: Ashfaqullah Khan; Dr. Inamullah; Maulana Lutfullah Jan; Fazalullah Kaleem(late)
- Education: Darul Uloom Deoband; Mazahirul Uloom Saharanpur
- Other name: Dagai Baba Ji
- Relatives: Maulana Asadullah Kaleem (grandson)

Religious life
- Religion: Islam
- Denomination: Sunni
- Founder of: Darul Uloom Mazhar Ul Uloom Dagai
- Profession: Islamic scholar and politician

Muslim leader
- Teacher: Zakariyya Kandhlawi; Hussain Ahmad Madani

Maulana Hamdullah Jan Dagai aka Dagai Baba Ji (born; 1909 - 12 January 2019) was a Pakistani Islamic scholar and politician. He was a student of Zakariyya Kandhlawi and Hussain Ahmad Madani. He was born in 1909 in Dagai, a village in Swabi District. He studied at Darul Uloom Deoband and Mazahirul Uloom Saharanpur. He died on 12 January 2019, aged 110. He was politically affiliated with Jamiat Ulema-e-Islam (F).

He was a strong supporter of peace and dialogue, especially concerning the Taliban. He believed that dialogue and negotiation, not the use of force, would help restore peace in the country.

== Education ==
He received his early education from his father Allama Abdul Hakim and uncle Maulana Siddique. After that he studied at Darul Uloom Deoband for some time but spent the last three years of his student life in Mazahir Uloom Saharanpur and from there he completed his Hadith studies in 1947.

== Political career ==
He participated in the 1970 general elections on the ticket of Jamiat Ulema-e-Islam and the 1988 general elections on the platform of the Islami Jamhoori Ittehad but was unsuccessful.

== Death and legacy ==
Maulana Hamdullah Jan was buried in his ancestral graveyard. Funeral prayers were attended by millions of his students, devotees, leaders of political parties, workers, and citizens.

=== Successors ===
Maulana Hamdullah's son, Ashfaqullah Khan, was made his political successor and superintendent of the madrassa, another son, Dr. Inamullah as deputy successor, the eldest son, Maulana Lutfullah Jan, as Nazim-e-Ala Darul Uloom Mazharul Uloom, while grandson Maulana Asadullah Kaleem was the religious successor. Dastaar Bandi of the successors was done by JUI-F chief Maulana Fazlur Rehman, who arrived at his residence to offer condolences. Maulana Gul Naseeb Khan, provincial Ameer of JUI-F, Mufti Kifayatullah, Maulana Ata-ul-Haq Darwish, Sardar Hussain Babak of ANP, Senator and provincial Ameer of Jamaat-e-Islami Mushtaq Ahmad Khan, Maulana Aziz-ur-Rehman Hazarvi, Senator Maulana Ata-ur-Rehman, and other leaders were also present.

== See also ==
- Mufti Fareed
