= Idris Tarangzai =

Pakistani Islamic scholar and politician (1961–2026)

Mawlana Idris Tarangzai
- ادریس ترنگزئی

Member of the Khyber Pakhtunkhwa Assembly
- In office 28 December 2002 – 4 April 2007

Personal details
- Born: 6 July 1961 Charsadda District, West Pakistan, Pakistan
- Died: 5 May 2026 (aged 64) Charsadda, Khyber Pakhtunkhwa, Pakistan
- Party: Jamiat Ulema-e-Islam (F)
- Children: Anis Ahmad; Muhammad Salman
- Education: Darul Uloom Haqqania; University of Peshawar
- Occupation: Islamic scholar and politician

Muhammad Idris Tarangzai (Pashto: محمد ادریس ترنگزئی; 6 July 1961 – 5 May 2026) was a Pakistani Islamic scholar and politician. He was a senior member of the Jamiat Ulema-e-Islam – F (JUI–F) and also served as a member of the Khyber Pakhtunkhwa Assembly from 2002 to 2007.

Born in Charsadda District, West Pakistan, Tarangzai acquired religious education from Darul Uloom Haqqania and contemporary education from University of Peshawar. He later taught at Darul Uloom Haqqania himself and was the teacher of several Islamic scholars. Tarangzai was a close aide to JUI–F's leader Maulana Fazal-ur-Rahman and himself became the district leader of JUI–F in Charsadda District. He was known for his strict criticism of Islamic extremism.

Tarangzai was assassinated on 5 May 2026 in the Utmanzai area of Charsadda. The Wahhabi jihadist group Islamic State – Khorasan Province (IS–KP or ISIS–K) claimed responsibility for carrying out the assassination, saying that "soldiers of the Caliphate killed a Taghuti cleric loyal to the apostate Pakistani government". On 30 September 2026, Peshawar Police announced that the assassin of Idris was killed by forces.

== Early life ==
Muhammad Idris Tarangzai was born on 6 July 1961 in Charsadda District of the West Pakistan, to a clerical family belonging to the Tarangzai tribe of Pashtuns. His father, Hakeem Abdul Haq, was a well known religious figure in his days and was known by locals as Munazir e-Islam. His grandfather was Mufti Shahzada, a Shaikh ul-Hadith and a graduate of Darul Uloom Deoband.

Tarangzai was the son-in-law of renowned religious leader and scholar Mawlana Hasan Jan. He has two sons, Anis Ahmad who is pursuing religious education in Darul Uloom Haqqania, and Muhammad Salman who is getting medical education.

== Education ==
Tarangzai got his education from Jamia Nomania (جامعه نعمانیه) in his hometown Utmanzai. For higher religious education (دورہِ حدیث) he went to Darul Uloom Haqqania in Akora Khattak, Khyber Pakhtunkhwa. Tarangzai also got contemporary education and received M.A. Arabic and M.A. Islamiyat degrees from University of Peshawar with good grades.

== Teaching ==
After completing his education, Tarangzai devoted himself to teaching at Jamia Nomania, and the management of the institute. He was Shaikh ul-Hadith at Jamia Nomania.

== Political career ==
Tarangzai had also actively participated in the politics of the country. He had been the Amir (امیر) of the popular Islamist political party Jamiat Ulema-e-Islam (F) of Charsadda District. He was the sarparast-e-alaa (سرپرستِ اعلیٰ) of the same party in District Charsadda.

Tarangzai had also been a member of the provincial assembly of KP (Khyber Pakhtunkhwa) province. He was the ex-chairman of the press committee and ex-member of Nifaz-e-Shariat Council (نفاذِ شریعت کونسل).

== Assassination ==
On 5 May 2026, unidentified assailants opened fire on the vehicle carrying Tarangzai in the Utmanzai area of Charsadda, and critically injured him. A hospital in Charsadda later confirmed his death from his injuries. Police said that the assailants fled the spot after committing the crime. Two on-duty police constables were also critically injured in the incident. The Islamic State – Khorasan Province (IS–KP or ISIS–K) claimed responsibility for the attack, saying that "soldiers of the Caliphate killed a Taghuti cleric loyal to the apostate Pakistani government, named Muhammad Idris".

Prime Minister Shehbaz Sharif and President Asif Ali Zardari condemned the murder of Tarangzai. JUI-F chief Maulana Fazal-ur Rahman also condemned the attack and announced nationwide protests.

On 30 September 2026, Peshawar Police announced that the assassin of Mawlana Idris was killed by forces.
