= Abdul Hadi Shahmansoori =

Pakistani Islamic scholar and writer (1873–1987)

Maulānā Abdul Hadi Shahmansoori Shah Mansoor Babaji
- مولانا عبدالہادی شاہ منصور باباجی

Personal life
- Born: Abdul Hadi Shahmansoori; 1873 Zarobi, Swabi District, British Indian Empire. (now Khyber Pakhtunkhwa, Pakistan).
- Died: 23 August 1987 (aged 113–114) Shah Mansur, Khyber Pakhtunkhwa, Pakistan
- Children: Maulana Noor ul Hadi
- Parent: Abdullah (father)
- Era: Modern
- Main interest(s): Tafsir, Hadith
- Notable work(s): Tafseer Al-Burhan Fi-Mushkilat-ul-Quran, Talkhees ul Aqaid, Tasheeel al-Bukhari, Tasheel ul Mishkat, Bayan Nazeer fi Unwan al Ta'beer
- Occupation: Islamic scholar, Muffassir, Politician

Religious life
- Religion: Islam
- Denomination: Sunni
- Creed: Hanafi

Muslim leader
- Influenced by: Husain Ali Alwani, Naseeruddin Ghorghushti
- Influenced: Qazi Fazl Ullah

Maulana Abdul Hadi Shahmansoori (1873 – 23 August 1987), also known as Shah Mansoor Babaji (Urdu: مولانا عبدالہادی شاہ منصوری), was a Pakistani Islamic scholar, mufassir (Qur'anic exegete), and politician from Zarobi, Swabi District, Khyber Pakhtunkhwa. Renowned for his expertise in Tafsir and Hadith, he devoted his life to Islamic education and scholarship. As the founder of Madrassa Taleem-ul-Quran in Shah Mansur, he taught Tafsir for 61 consecutive years and authored several notable works, including Tafseer Al-Burhan Fi-Mushkilat-ul-Quran and Tasheel al-Bukhari.

== Early life and education ==
Maulana Abdul Hadi Shah Mansoori belonged to a scholarly family and was born in 1873 in Zarobi, Swabi district, Khyber Pakhtunkhwa, Pakistan. He studied early Arabic and Persian books from his father Abdullah. He studied tafsir from Husain Ali Alwani and hadith from Naseeruddin Ghorghushti.

== Career ==
After completing his education, he started interpreting in Pashto in his neighborhood in 1971. Later, he founded the Madrassa Taleem Ul Quran in Shah Mansur. He used to teach Tafsir three times a year for 61 consecutive years: (Once every Ramadan, once to students during the academic year, and once to his community after the Isha prayer).

He also contested for a National Assembly seat in the 1970 general elections.

== Literary contributions ==
- Shah Mansoori, Abdulhadi (1987). Tafseer Al-Burhan Fi-Mushkilat-ul-Quran (in Arabic). Educational Press, Karachi.
- Talkhees ul Aqaid
- Tasheeel al-Bukhari
- Tasheel ul Mishkat
- Bayan Nazeer fi Unwan al Ta'beer

== Death and legacy ==
He died on 23 August 1987, at the age of 108. His funeral prayers were led by his eldest son and his successor, Maulana Noor ul Hadi, and were attended by approximately 65 to 70 thousand people. One of his students includes Qazi Fazl Ullah.

== Bibliography ==
- Fani, Muhammad Ibrahim (1996). Hayat Sheikh ul Quran. Maktaba Shah Waliullah, Akhora Khatak, Nowshehra. p. 255.
- Saidurrahman (2016). Mulana Abdulhadi Shah Mansoori ki Tafseeri Khidmat. Allama Iqbal Open University (AIOU), Islamabad.
- Yousafzai, Hamdillah (2014). Tazkira-e-Hazraat-e-Shekhain. Madani Kutab Khana, Swabi.
- Ullah, Nizam (2015). سورة الم السجدۃ اور سورة الملک کی تفسیر کا تین منتخب اساتذہ تفسیر کی تعلیمات کے تناظر میں تحلیلی جائزہ مولانا محمد طاہر پنج پیری، مولانا عبدالہادی شاہ منصوری، مولانا سیّد عبدالسلام رستمی [An analytical review of the interpretation of Surah Al-Mal-Sajdah and Surah Al-Mulk in the context of the teachings of three selected teachers of interpretation: Maulana Muhammad Tahir Panj Piri, Maulana Abdul Hadi Shah Mansoori, Maulana Syed Abdul Salam Rustami. M. Phil. Thesis]. Abdul Wali Khan University Mardan.
- Ali, Imtiaz (2023). تسہیل البخاری میں مولانا عبدالہادی شاہ منصوری کے منہج کا تحلیلی جائزہ [Analytical review of Maulana Abdul Hadi Shah Mansoori's methodology in Tasheeel al-Bukhari M. Phil. Thesis]. Abdul Wali Khan University Mardan.
