= Hamdullah =

Hamdullah is a given name and surname. People with the name include:

- Sheikh Hamdullah
- Hafiz Hamdullah
- Rami hamdullah
- Hamdullah Suphi Tanrıöver
- Hamdullah Mohib
- Hamdullah Mukhlis
- Hamdullah Nomani
- Hamdullah Jan
- Hamdullah Mostowfi Qazvini
- Muhammed Hamdulla Sayeed
