= Rahimullah Haqqani =

Afghan cleric (died 2022)

Sheikh Rahimullah Haqqani
- شیخ رحیم الله حقاني
- Died: 11 August 2022; Kabul, Afghanistan
- Education: Darul Uloom Haqqania
- Occupations: Islamic scholar, director of Afghan Madrasas, principal at Madrasah Zubaria, and Taliban commander
- Known for: Tough stance on ISIS

Sheikh Rahimullah Haqqani (Pashto: شیخ رحیم الله حقاني; died 11 August 2022) was an Afghan Islamic scholar and director of Afghan Madrasas and principal at Madrasah Zubaria in Peshawar. Haqqani also led a brigade of the Afghan Taliban in Nangarhar province. He was a former student of Darul Uloom Haqqania. He was student of Shaikh Idrees.

Haqqani had a tough stance on ISIS. He was considered very close to the Afghan Taliban. Haqqani used to work as a principal at Madrasah Zubaria in Peshawar's Deer Colony in Pakistan. After the survival of the Peshawar blast, Rahimullah Haqqani blamed the attack on Khawarij. The Afghan Taliban use the term Khawarij for extremists affiliated with ISIS.

== Assassination attempts ==
There were two attacks on him in Peshawar in which he was safe. He also had a madrassa in Peshawar where a suicide attack took place in October 2020. Haqqani was also unsuccessfully attacked in Peshawar's Ring Road in 2013.

== Death ==
On 11 August 2022, he was killed in a suicide bomb attack in Kabul. The attacker reportedly had a bomb stuck to his amputated leg. Another Taliban-aligned cleric, Mujib Rahman Ansari, was also assassinated a few weeks later.
