= Jamiat Ulema-e-Islam – S =

Political party in Pakistan

Jamiat Ulema-e Islam – S جمیعت علماءِ اسلام – سمیع الحق
- Abbreviation: JUI–S
- Emir: Abdul Haq Sani
- Historical leader: Sami-ul-Haq
- Founder: Shabbir Ahmad Usmani (founded JUI)
- Founded: 1980; 46 years ago (current)
- Split from: JUI (F)
- Preceded by: JUI
- Headquarters: Darul Uloom Haqqania, Akora Khattak, Pakistan
- Student wing: Jamiat Talba-e-Islam (S)
- Ideology: Islamism (primarily Deobandi); Deobandi jihadism Pan-Islamism; Social conservatism
- Political position: Far-right
- National affiliation: Difa-e-Pakistan Council
- Colors: Black & White
- Senate: 0 / 100
- National Assembly: 0 / 366

Election symbol
- Ladder

Party flag

Jamiat Ulema-e-Islam – S (JUI–S) (Note: Urdu: جمیعت علماءِ اسلام – سمیع الحق) is a political party in Pakistan. It was established in 1980, as a breakaway faction of Jamiat Ulema-e-Islam (JUI) founded by Maulana Shabbir Ahmed Usmani in 1945. The "S" in its name stands for the name of its founding leader, Maulana Sami-ul-Haq.

A small party in the realm of Pakistani politics it achieved some success in 2002 when it joined the provincial government in Khyber Pakhtunkhwa as a junior member of the Muttahida Majlis-e-Amal (MMA) coalition government.

== History ==
During the 1980s, the JUI supported some of General Zia ul Haq's policies, including his anti-Soviet Jihad in Afghanistan. Additionally, official patronage and financial support for madrassas during the Zia years allowed the JUI to build thousands of madrassas, especially in the NWFP (now KPK), which were instrumental in the formation of the Taliban. At the same time the JUI was distrustful of Zia's close ties with the Jamaat-e-Islami and joined the anti-Zia and PPP-led Movement for the Restoration of Democracy (MRD).

Following the death of Mufti Mehmood Ahmed in 1980, this dual relationship with Zia's regime eventually led to a split in the party which came to be divided into the JUI-F, headed by Maulana Fazal-ur-Rehman and the JUI-S headed by Samiul Haq, who supported supporting Jihadism and a totalitarian state and also Zia's regime and was a member in his parliament, the Majlis-e-Shura.

JUI-S remained active mostly in regional significance in Khyber Pakhtunkhwa but has no representation on the national level.

JUI-S also remained strong supporter of Taliban in Afghanistan and openly supported militarism/jihadism due to which its main former presiding leader Maulana Sami-ul-Haq came to be known as "Father of Taliban". Sami-ul-Haq was also a founder of Difa-e-Pakistan Council and also a founding member of a six-party religious alliance Muttahida Majlis-e-Amal ahead of 2002 general elections.

JUI-S remained allied with Muttahida Majlis-e-Amal until 2017 when it formed political alliance with Imran Khan's Pakistan Tehreek-e-Insaf. But later before 2018 general elections, its chief Sami-ul-Haq announced that JUI-S will participate in election on its own election symbol.

JUI-S also joined Muttahida Deeni Mahaz (United Religious Front), an alliance of relatively small religio-political parties, to participate in the 2013 general election but MDM later got merged with Muttahida Majlis-e-Amal. In 2018, after the assassination of Sami-ul-Haq, the party's activities gradually died down. His son, Maulana Hamid-ul-Haq Haqqani later became its chief. Its madrassa organization is Darul Uloom Haqqania, a Deobandi Islamic seminary which is the alma mater of many prominent Taliban members.

On 28 February 2025, a suicide bombing at the Darul Uloom Haqqania seminary killed 6 people, including JUI-S party leader Hamid-ul-Haq Haqqani.

== Electoral history ==
=== National Assembly elections ===
National Assembly
Election	Votes	%	Seats	+/–
1997	48,838	0.25%	0 / 237	Steady
2002	In alliance with MMA			
2008	3,885	0.01%	0 / 342	Steady
2013	In alliance with MDM			
2018	24,582	0.05%	0 / 342	Steady

== See also ==
- List of Deobandi organisations
- Jamiat Ulema-e-Islam
- Jamiat Ulema-e-Islam (F)
