= Qazi Fazl Ullah =

Pakistani politician and Islamic scholar

Qazi Maulana Fazlullah
- مولانا قاضی فضل اللہ ایڈوکیٹ
- Main interest(s): Jurisprudence economics Politics

Religious life
- Religion: Islam
- Denomination: Sunni

Member of the National Assembly of Pakistan
- In office 15 October 1993 – 5 November 1996
- Constituency: NA-8 (Charsadda-II)

Personal details
- Party: Islami Jamhoori Ittehad; Jamiat Ulema-e-Islam (F)
- Education: Wafaq ul Madaris Al-Arabia; International Islamic University; University of Peshawar
- Occupation: Islamic scholar Politician; Writer

Qazi Maulana Fazlullah (Urdu: مولانا قاضی فضل اللہ ایڈوکیٹ) is a Pakistani Islamic scholar based in California, United States. He is a great Islamic orator and specialist in Quran and science.

== Education ==
He studied at Wafaq ul Madaris Al-Arabia, Pakistan, University of Peshawar and International Islamic University in Pakistan. He specializes in Law, Economics, and Political Science.

== Political career ==
He served as parliamentarian of the 10th National Assembly of Pakistan from 15 October 1993 to 5 November 1996.

== Literary work ==
His books include:

- Science of Hadith (English). Lulu Press. 2015. ISBN 978-1-3295-6705-4.
- MOON SIGHTING, SALATUL TARAWEEH AND SALATUL WITR (ENGLISH). Lulu Press. 2015. ISBN 978-1-3295-5535-8.
- Hajj & Umrah According To All Four Schools Of Jurisprudence. Lulu Press. 2018. ISBN 978-1-7326-0178-9.
- Ullah, Qazi Fazl (2015). Sharia & Politics. Lulu.com. ISBN 978-1-3296-9137-7.
- Jesus In the Quran. Hund International Publishing. 2018. ISBN 978-1-7326-0174-1.
- Jihad: What, Why, When, Where, and How. Lulu Press. 2016. ISBN 978-1-3298-3106-3.
- Jihad: Why, How, & When. Hund International Publishing. 2018. ISBN 978-1-9700-4903-9.
- Ramadan: Components of the Holy Month. Hund International Publishing. 2018. ISBN 978-1-9700-4900-8.
- Sayyidah Aaisha: Age & Marriage. Hund International Publishing. 2018. ISBN 978-1-9700-4904-6.
- Islam Aur Siyasat (Urdu ed.). Hund International Publishing. 2018. ISBN 978-1-9700-4906-0.
- Samraj Teesri Duny Aur New World Order (Urdu ed.). Hund International Publishing. 2019. ISBN 978-1-9700-4918-3.
- Mohammadur Rasoolullah (Urdu ed.). Hund International Publishing. 2018. ISBN 978-1-9700-4912-1.
- Jamiat Ulama - i - Islam: Tareef Aur Ta' aaruf (Urdu ed.). Hund International Publishing. 2018. ISBN 978-1-9700-4915-2.
- Fiqh Kee Tareekh Wa Irtiqa (Urdu ed.). Hund International Publishing. 2018. ISBN 978-1-9700-4901-5.
- Dawat Aur Tareeqi Kar (Urdu ed.). Hund International Publishing. 2018. ISBN 978-1-9700-4909-1.
