= Khayaban =

- Discipline: Linguistics, literature
- Language: Urdu
- Edited by: Badshah Munir Bukhari

Publication details
- History: 1958-present
- Publisher: University of Peshawar (Pakistan)
- Frequency: Biannual

Standard abbreviations
- ISO 4: Khayaban

Indexing
- ISSN: 1993-9302 (print); 2073-3666 (web)
- OCLC no.: 4475971

Links
- Journal homepage

Khayaban: An Interdisciplinary Journal of the Language Sciences (alt. Khiyābān) is a biannual peer-reviewed academic journal of linguistics and literature published in Urdu by the Institute of Urdu and Persian Language and Literature at the University of Peshawar.
