= Muhammad Fareed =

Pakistani Mufti

Mufti Muhammad Fareed
- مفتی محمد فرید

Personal life
- Born: 16 April 1926
- Died: July 9, 2011 (aged 85) District Headquarters Hospital, Swabi
- Notable work: Fatwa Faridiya

Religious life
- Religion: Islam
- Denomination: Sunni
- Institute: Darul Uloom Haqqania
- Profession: Mufti, writer

Muslim leader
- Post: president and Shaykh al-Hadith of Dar al-Ifta at Darul Uloom Haqqania

Muhammad Fareed ((Urdu: مولانا مفتی محمد فرید) 16 April 1926 – 9 July 2011) was a Pakistani Mufti and writer. He belonged to Zarobi, a village in Swabi District. He was the president and Shaykh al-Hadith of Dar al-Ifta in Darul Uloom Haqqania Akora Khattak. He was known for his Fatwa Faridiya (a collections of Fatwas in seven volumes).

Maulana Muhammad Fareed died on 9 July 2011, at the District Headquarters Hospital, Swabi, after a long illness. He was buried in his ancestral graveyard in Swabi district. The funeral prayer was attended by a large number of religious scholars including Hamdullah Jan, Sami-ul-Haq, and other scholars, students, social workers, and locals.

== Writings ==
- Fatawa Faridiya - فتاوىۀٰ فريديه. Vol. 7. 2013. OCLC 875671631.
- Maqālāt - مقالات. 2009. OCLC 714329384.
- Minhāj al-Sunan : sharḥ Jāmiʻ al-sunan lil-Imām al-Tirmidhī. 1994. OCLC 315870355.

== See also ==
- Hamdullah Jan
