= Zarobi =

Coordinates: 34°2′0″N 72°34′0″E

Zarobai
- Village
- Interactive map of Zarobai
- Country: Pakistan
- Province: Khyber Pakhtunkhwa
- District: Swabi

Zarobai Munara, commonly known as Zarobi, is a historical village and Union Council of Swabi District in the Khyber Pakhtunkhwa province of Pakistan. It is located at 34°2′0N 72°34′0E with an altitude of 321 metres (1056 feet).

This is one of the big villages of Swabi District in terms of population. This village is distributed in two main parts: Porta Cham (Abu Sayed) and Khakata Cham (Akhun Sayad). The people of the village are Pashtuns of the Yousafzai tribe and the area is part of what was historically known as the Mandanr country. There is also a presence of Bajauris in the village.

== Khel (division) ==
This village is divided in two main parts, Abu Sayad kanday and Akhoon Sayad Kanday, and eight sectors (Mohalla's, Tapa, Khels, cham) Like other Yousafzai villages, Zarobai is also organized into eight blocks. Each block consists of four tals (sub-groups), making a total of 32 tals residing in the village. Furthermore, according to the Pakhtunkhwa Revenue Department, each tal comprises 24 motai. The following is a list of these blocks, which hold shares in the land:

1- Mohammad Khel (Makhkai- Front section) 2- Mohammad Khel (Shata- Rear Section ) 3- Khudo Khel 4- Dranjwal (Including Sufa Khel )

5- Daka Khel (Including Khadar Khel, Mahmood Khel, and Jatta Khel.) 6- Bhai Khel (Including Sheri Khel, Gadai Khel, Sheikhan and Sultan Khel.) 7- Bozar Khel (Including Behzad Khel, Mosa Khel) 8- Khalchi Khel

== Location ==
Zarobi is situated on the west/north bank of the river Abaseen (Indus River) in the southeast of District Swabi (Pakhtunkhwa), five miles from Tarbela Dam in the east and in the south its border with Attock District, and east south border with Ghazi Tehsil of District Haripur (Hazara).

Nearby villages: Topi, Kotha, Kalabat, Marghuz, Garh Dhok Yousafi, Batakara, Garai, Sheenkay, Chhachh (Attock) Qazipur, Hasanpur, Ghazi and Zaida.

Zarobai is the remnant of village Munara eroded by a dreadful flood in the past in June 1841 AD. The inhabitants of Munara were used to face horrible accidents and incidents with great tolerance and dare caused by the unruly river Indus.

== History ==
Zarobai is the continuation of the historical village Munara which was once existed at the coast of Indus (Abaseen river) and then destroyed two times in Indus floods. After that crucial incident the people of that destroyed village were brought together at Zarobai derai and later it was named just Zarobai. The old village lies a little to the west of present village at a distance of about a kilometer whose archives are still present. All the dynasties of the village shifted to the place where the now called Zarobai and the then called Derai exist.

When the partition of the whole territory belonging to the Pashtoons was taking place among-st their tribes by Shiekh Milli's partition rule, the ancestors of the valley's inhabitants were given their part/portion at Munara but it was a small village and their share was much greater which was impossible to be given here so they got their remaining portion at Trapakai (now included in Tarbela Dam) and Pajman. Sheikh Milli (Note: Fully, Shaikh Mali bin Adam Yusufzai) was a trusted advisor, legislator and lieutenant of the Malik Ahmad Khan who founded Pashtunkhwa. He created the land system and allocation of the Yusufzai. It was then disbanded by the British Raj for the imposition of tax collection purposes, written by Abdul Hai Habibi to have been in 1829 AD. (Note: British did not rule the area until the late 19th century.)

Munara (which was already a built up village at the north bank river Indus) was a historical place; its name has been mentioned in the battles fought between Yousafzai and Dalazak tribes time by time and other historic references, owing to its importance in history. The battle between Gaju Khan Yousafzai and Malik Bhai Khan (Dalazak) which lasted till the depreciation of Dalazaks was fought somewhere near Munara. The defeatist Dilazak tribe escaped to the opposite side (south bank of river Indus i.e. Church Valley) across water.

In 1841 a record snow fell, which blocked the whole way of water in river Indus, and by melting the huge rocks of ice, there might be a fierce flood which would definitely cause destruction. Therefore, the people living on both sides of the Indus were made aware of the situation. The government servants went to every village for appropriate preparation, but the time was short. At last that happened of which every one was afraid. The biggest stormy flood in the history of Indus valley, made a big loss of lives and great destruction to the property. The majority were made safe due to pre-storm actions and instructions.

There are also some information about some families who shifted to Ghur Ghishto (Church Valley, District Attock) before possible flood and some children and younger ones flee to the nearby villages in that tumult. Some baby girls were later discovered in village Marghuz, but there is no authentic proof of it.

The place where Zarobai existed was a big knoll/hillock which was much safer from flood, and therefore the people felt no hesitation to be settled there. Those people were very prudent and farsighted, hence they gave the village a model shape, also made possible arrangements and prepared plans for future, which is why it doesn't seem like a village but a model town.

== Name ==
Some research scholars belonging to this village have researched up to somehow but more work is going on, regarding this matter. Some believe that this Zarobai, Zarobay or Zarobi is in accordance with Sarobai, Sarobay or Sarobi in Afghanistan, but later a letter Z or S changed in both either in Zarobai or Sarobai. The people living there would possibly have some conformity of tribes. There are many villages in East Pukhtonkhwa which are similar in names to the towns and cities either in West Pukhtonkhwa or in Hindustan. The similarities in naming are heavily tied to how Afghanistan is the motherland of all Pashtun tribes in all of West, Central and South Asia.

== History of Azad schools in Pakhtunkhwa ==
Abdul Ghaffar Khan dearly known as Bācha Khan, who back in 1920 used education as a means for social transformation and established a chain of more than seventy schools in the North West Frontier Province (NWFP) making the local community an integral part of his educational program. This effort was initiated at a time when there was a dire need of purposeful and quality educational system that was both easily accessible and catered to the social, cultural and developmental needs of the Pakhtoons. It was a challenging effort; however, Bācha Khan made it possible by involving the local community, stirring up in them a sense of responsibility for collective effort and self-reliance. This endeavor proved fruitful in as far as it remained unobstructed by the oppressive British colonial forces.

- Azad Islami School Zarobai, an established institution of the village

Bacha Khan, founder of the educational movement in Pakhtoonkhwa formed 100 Azad Islamic schools during his educational movement. He came to the village Zarobai (Swabi) in a series of his tours to different villages and towns and he formed this school here as well named Azad islami school, later the name changed to Islami School Zarobi. Mulana Abdul Ghafoor sb faregh Deoband was the 1st in charge/Headmaster of the Azad school Zarobai. This Islamic school contains 1200 students which is having co education until 5th class. This school is running in two shifts. The morning shift is for general education and the evening shift is for Islamic teaching i.e. Nazira Quran, translation, Islamic books etc. This school is run by the Jirga of Zarobi village. The school income comes from different sources like charity, Qurbanai Sarmane, Jirga nagha amount (penalty amount) this amount is being paid by those who violate the rules of Bela (forest of Abaseen).

== Notable people from Zarobai Munara ==
- Muhammad Fareed, Mufti and writer of Darul Uloom Haqqania
- Abdul Hadi Shahmansoori
- Fazl Ali Haqqani, Former MPA of Khyber Pakhtunkhwa Provincial Assembly
