= Ghumman (surname) =

- Jāti: Jat
- Religions: Islam, Hinduism, Sikhism
- Languages: Punjabi
- Country: Pakistan, India
- Region: Punjab
- Ethnicity: Punjabi
- Family names: yes

Ghumman or Ghuman is a Jat clan of Punjabis, found in Pakistan and India, mainly in Sialkot, Jhelum, Gujranwala, Daska and some other districts of Punjab, Pakistan.

In India, they are found in Gurdaspur, Amritsar and Tarn taran districts of Majha Punjab, India.

== Notable people with this surname ==
- Muhammad Ilyas Ghuman (born 1969), Pakistani Islamic scholar
- Azeem Ghumman (born 1991), Pakistani cricketer
- Kapur Singh Ghuman (1927–1986), Indian writer and theatre actor
- Varinder Singh Ghuman (1983–2025), Indian bodybuilder and wrestler
