= Rashid Ahmed Khan Tahirkheli =

Dr Rashid Ahmed Khan Tahirkheli
- Born: Ghazi, Pakistan
- Died: 13 August 2014; Hayatabad
- Scientific career
- Fields: Geology
- Workplaces: Vice-Chancellor Gandhara University, Pakistan, 1999 to 2014; Vice-Chancellor University of Peshawar, 1982–1987; Professor and director, University of Peshawar

Rashid Ahmed Khan Tahirkheli was the vice-chancellor of Gandhara University. Prior to his appointment he was Director of the Geology Department and ex Vice-Chancellor at Peshawar University. He was also Professor Emeritus in the National Centre of Excellence in Geology, University of Peshawar. His scholarly reputation rests on his contributions to the Geology of the Himalayas, Karakoram and Hindukush. He received prizes including Sitara-i-Imtiaz in 1982.

== Academic career ==
Prior to becoming vice-chancellor of Gandhara University, Tahirkheli was vice-chancellor of the University of Peshawar, 1982–1987; professor and director, Center of Excellence in Geology, 1978–1988; chairman, Department of Geology, 1964–1978; reader and chairman, Department of Geology, 1964–1969; senior geologist and deputy director at the Geological Survey of Pakistan, 1962–1964; geologist, 1959–1962, and assistant geologist, 1951–1958.

Tahirkheli was awarded a nine-month Senior Fulbright Fellowship (1974–75) to perform research at the US Geological Survey, National Centre at Denver (US). He became an adjunct professor in Dartmouth College (US) in 1984 and was awarded a McNamara Fellowship in 1984 for one year.

He was the vice-chairman of the International lithosphere program, Himalaya and neighbouring region (IUGG-IUGS), subcommittee 6, UNESCO (1978–90), chairman of the Working Group on Mineral Development for 6th five-year plan (1977–82). He was appointed a member of Mineral Technical Committee, Ministry of Natural Resources (1968–80).

== Education ==
Tahirkheli studied at Aligarh Muslim University, Aligarh, India, earning a Bachelor of Science in 1945 and at University of St Andrews, Scotland, earning a Master of Science in 1960, and a doctorate in 1964.

== Other awards ==
Tahirkheli was elected as Fellow of Pakistan Academy of Science in 1983. He was awarded the Medal for Academic Excellence by the Edinboro University in 1986.

== Works ==
- Tahirkheli, R.A.K. & Naeser, C.N., 1975. Zircon fission track age of Post Ranch ash bed near Benson, Arizona. Arizona Acad. Sci., vol.10, pp. 111–113
- Keller, H.M.; Tahirkheli, R.A.K.; Mirza, M.A.; Johnson, G.D.; Johnson, N.M.; Opdyke, N.D. (1977). "Magnetic polarity stratigraphy of the Upper Siwalik deposits, Pabbi Hills, Pakistan". Earth and Planetary Science Letters. 36 (1): 187–201. Bibcode:1977E&PSL..36..187K. doi:10.1016/0012-821X(77)90198-4.
- Tahirkheli, R. A.K., Mattauer, M. Proust, F. and Tapponnier, P., 1977. Some new data on the India-Eurasia convergence in the Pakistan Himalaya. CNRS Himalaya, Sci. de la terre, 268, pp. 209–220
- Tahirkheli, R.A.K. Mattauer, M., Proust, F. & Tapponnier, P., 1977. The India-Eurasia suture zone in northern Pakistan; synthesis and interpretation of data at plate scale. Geodynamics of Pakistan (A. Farah & K.A. DeJong, eds.). Geol. Surv. Pakistan, Quetta, pp. 125–130
- Barndt, J., Johnson, N.M., Johnson, G.D., Opdyke, N.M., Lindsay, E.H. Pilbeam, D. & Tahirkheli, R.A.K., 1978. The magnetic polarity stratigraphy and the age of the Siwalik group near Dhok Pathan Village, Potwar Plateau, Pakistan. Earth Planet. Sci. Lett., vol. 41, pp. 355–364
- RAK Tahirkheli & MQ Jan (Editors), 1979. Geology of Kohistan, Karakoram Himalaya, North Pakistan, 187 pp. NCE Geology, University of Peshawar.
- Johnson, G.D., Johnson, N.M., Opdyke, N.D. & Tahirkheli, R.A.K., 1979. Magnetic reversal stratigraphy and sedimentary tectonic history of the Upper Siwalik group, Eastern Salt Range and south western Kashmir. In Geodynamics of Pakistan (Farah & DeJong, eds.), Geol. Surv. Pak, Quetta, pp. 449–165
- Opdyke, N.D.; Lindsay, E.; Johnson, G.D.; Johnson, N.; Tahirkheli, R.A.K.; Mirza, M.A. (1979). "Magnetic polarity stratigraphy and vertebrate paleontology of the upper siwalik subgroup of northern Pakistan". Palaeogeography, Palaeoclimatology, Palaeoecology. 27: 1–34. Bibcode:1979PPP....27....1O. doi:10.1016/0031-0182(79)90091-9.
- Zeitler, P., Tahirkheli, R. A. K., Naeser, C., Johnson, N. & Lyons, J. (1980). "Preliminary fission track ages from the Swat Valley, northern Pakistan" (PDF). Geol. Bull. Univ. Peshawar. 13 (special issue): 63–66.
- International Committee on Geodynamics. Group 6; National Centre of Excellence in Geology (1980). R.A.K. Tahirkheli; Q. Jan; M. Majid (eds.). Proceedings of the International Committee on Geodynamics, Group 6 meeting at Peshawar, 23–29 November 1979. National Centre of Excellence in Geology, University of Peshawar.
- Tahirkheli, R.A.K., 1980. Major tectonic scars of Peshawar valley and adjoining areas, and associated magmatism. Geol. Bull. Univ. Peshawar, 13 (Special Issue): 39–47
- Tahirkheli, R.A.K., 1980. The Main Mantle Thrust: its scope in metallogeny of northern Pakistan. Geol. Bull. Univ. Peshawar, 13 (Special Issue): 193–198
- Johnson, G.D., Rey, P. H., Ardray, R. H., Visser, C. F., Opdyke, N.D. & Tahirkheli, R.A.K., 1981. Paleoenvironments of the Siwalik Group, Pakistan & India. In: G. Rapp, Jr. and C.F. Vondra, (eds.) Hominid Sites; their geologic setting. AAAS selected symposium, vol. 63, pp. 197–254
- Tahirkheli, R. A. K., 1981. An extended domain of the Yasin group in Karakoram and Hindukush. In "Contemporary Geoscientific Researches in Himalaya" 1 (A.K.Sinha, ed.). Singh Publ., Dehra Dun, India. p. 243
- Tahirkheli, R.A.K., Kamal, M., 1981. Whether tectono-magmatic regimes offer any prospect for primary uranium mineralization in northern Pakistan. Geological Bulletin, University of Peshawar, 14:95–100
- Tahirkheli, R. A. K., 1981. Geological complexion of unfossiliferous Lesser Himalayan sequence in Pakistan: A review. In "Contemporary Geoscientific Researches in Himalayan, 1 (A.K.Sinha, ed.). Singh Publ., Dehra Dun, India, pp. 21–29
- Tahirkheli, R.A.K., 1981. An analysis of litho-tectonic zones associated with the Himalayan orogeny, in northern Pakistan. Geological Bulletin University of Punjab, 16:98–110.
- Zeitler, P.K. & Tahirkheli, R.A.K., 1981. Uplift of the lesser Himalayas, Northern Pakistan, as inferred from fission-track ages of sphene, epidote, and zircon. Nuclear Track Detect., vol. 5:1–7
- Tahirkheli, R.A.K. (1982). Geology of the Himalaya, Karakoram and Hindukush in Pakistan. National Centre of Excellence in Geology, University of Peshawar.
- Johnson, G.D., Opdyke, N.D., Pilbeam, D., Tahirkheli, R.A.K., & Shah, S.M.F., 1982. Introduction to special volume on Siwaliks. Palaeogeography, Palaeoclimatology, Palaeoecology, vol. 37:1–11
- Johnson, G.D., Zeitler, P., Naeser, C.W., Johnson, N.M., Summers, D.M., Frost, C.D., Opdyke, N.D. & Tahirkheli, R.A.K., 1982. The occurrence and fission-track ages of Late Neogene and Quaternary volcanic sediments, Siwalik Group, N. Pakistan. Palaeogeogr., Palaeoclim., Palaeoecol., vol. 37, pp. 17–42.
- Johnson, N.M., Opdyke, N.D., Johnson, G.D. & Tahirkheli, R.A.K., 1982. Paleomagnetism of the middle Siwalik Group rocks of the Potwar Plateau, Pakistan. Palaeogeography, Palaeoclimatology, Palaeoecology vol. 37:17–42
- Opdyke, N.D., Johnson, N. M., Johnson, G. D. Landsay, E.H. & Tahirkheli R.A.K., 1982. Paleomagnetism of the Middle Siwalik formations of N. Pakistan and rotation of the Salt Range Decollement. Palaeogeography, Palaeoclimatology, Palaeoecology, vol. 37:1–15
- Zeitler, P.K., Johnson, N.M., Naseer, C.W. & Tahirkheli, R.A.K., 1982. Fission-track evidence for Quaternary uplift of the Nanga Parbat region, Pakistan. Nature, vol. 298:255–257
- Zeitler, P.K., Tahirkheli, R.A.K., Naseer, C.W. & Johnson, N.M., 1982. Unroofing history of a suture zone in the Himalaya of Pakistan by means of fission-track annealing ages. Earth and Planetary Science Letters, vol. 57:227–240
- Tahirkheli, R.A.K., 1983. Geological evolution of Kohistan island arc on the southern flank of the Karakoram-Hindukush in Pakistan. Bollettino di Geofisica Teorica ed Applicata, vol. 25:351–364
- Tahirkheli, R.A.K. & Jan, M.Q., 1984. The geographic and geologic domains of the Karakoram. Int. Karakoram Project, vol.2. (K.J. Miller, ed.). Royal Geog. Soc. London, pp. 57–70
- Burbank, D.W. & Tahirkheli, R.A.K., 1985. The magnetostratigraphy, fission-track dating and stratigraphic evolution of the Peshawar intermontane basin, northern Pakistan. Geol. Soc. Am. Bull., vol. 96:539–552
- Johnson, N.M. Stix, J., Tauxe, L., Cerveny, P.F. & Tahirkheli, R.A.K., 1985. Paleomagnetic chronology, fluvial processes & tectonic implications of the Siwalik deposits near Chinji village, Pakistan. Journal of Geology, vol. 93:27–40
- Khan, M.J.; Opdyke, N.D.; Tahirkheli, R.A.K. (1988). "Magnetic stratigraphy of the Siwalik group, Bhittani, Marwat and Khasor ranges, northwestern Pakistan and the timing of neocene tectonics of the Trans Indus". Journal of Geophysical Research: Solid Earth. 93 (B10): 11773–11790. Bibcode:1988JGR....9311773K. doi:10.1029/JB093iB10p11773.
- Burbank, D.W., Beck, R.A., Raynolds, R.G.H., Hobbs, R., Tahirkheli, R.A.K., 1988. Thrusting and gravel progradation in foreland basins: a test of post- thrusting gravel dispersal. Geology, vol. 16(12): 1143–1146
- Zeitler, P.K., Sutter, J.F., Williams, I.S., Zartman, R., Tahirkheli, R.A.K., 1989. Geochronology and temperature history of the Nanga Parbat-Haramosh Massif, Pakistan. Special Paper of the Geological Society of America, vol 232:1–22
- Cerveny, P.F., Johnson, N.M., Tahirkheli, R.A.K., Bonis, N.R., 1989. Tectonic and geomorphic implications of Siwalik group heavy minerals, Potwar Plateau, Pakistan. Special Paper of the Geological Society of America, vol 232:129–136
