= Ilyas Ghuman =

Pakistani Islamic scholar and theologian (born 1969)

Mutakallim-i Islam Mawlana Muhammad Ilyas Ghuman
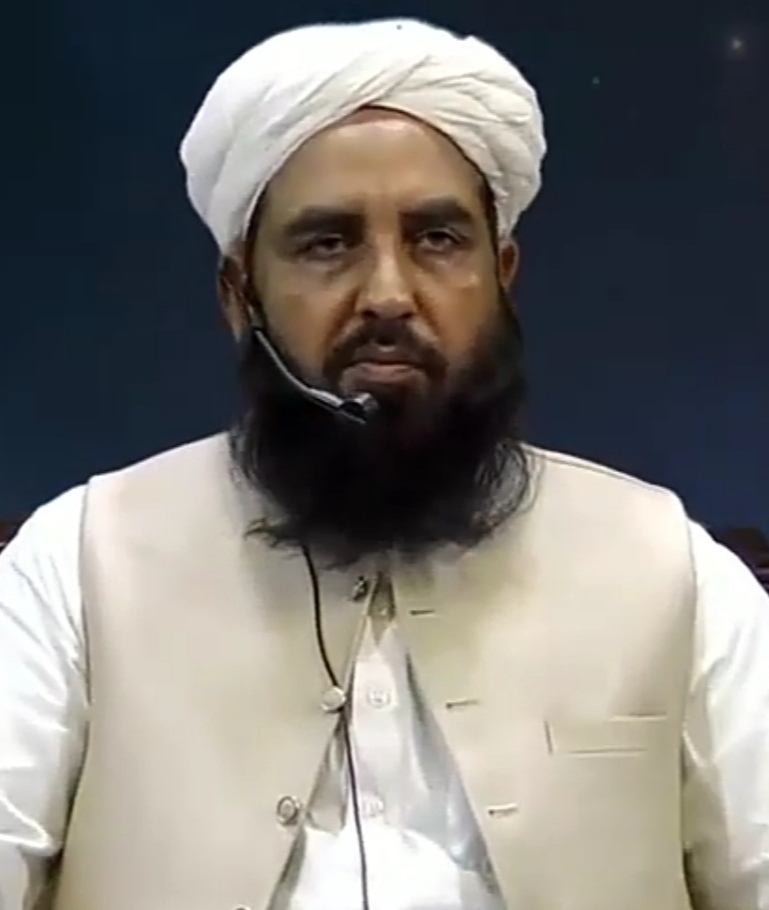

Personal life
- Born: 12 April 1969 (age 57) Sargodha, West Pakistan, Pakistan
- Notable work: Duroos-e-Quran
- Education: Jamia Binoria
- Occupation: Director & CEO of Ahnaf Media Services
- Website: http://www.ahnafmedia.com/

Religious life
- Religion: Islam
- Denomination: Sunni
- Founder of: Aalami Markaz Ahle Sunnat Wal Jamaat, Sargodha
- Jurisprudence: Hanafi
- Tariqa: Chishti
- Creed: Maturidi
- Movement: Deobandi

Muhammad Ilyas Ghuman (Note: Urdu: محمد الیاس گھمن, romanized: Muḥammad Ilyās Ghuman) (born 12 April 1969) is a Pakistani Islamic scholar and theologian of the Deobandi movement. Born in Sargodha to a Ghuman family, Ilyas studied at Jamia Binoria in Karachi and was a disciple of Azizur Rahman Hazarvi.

Ghuman is an expert in Ilm al-Kalam (speculative theology) and is known by his admirers as Mutakallim-i Islam. He is also a religious philosopher, Sufi, and a debater. Ghuman is the head of Markaz Ahle Sunnat Wal Jamaat in Sargodha.

== Early life and career ==
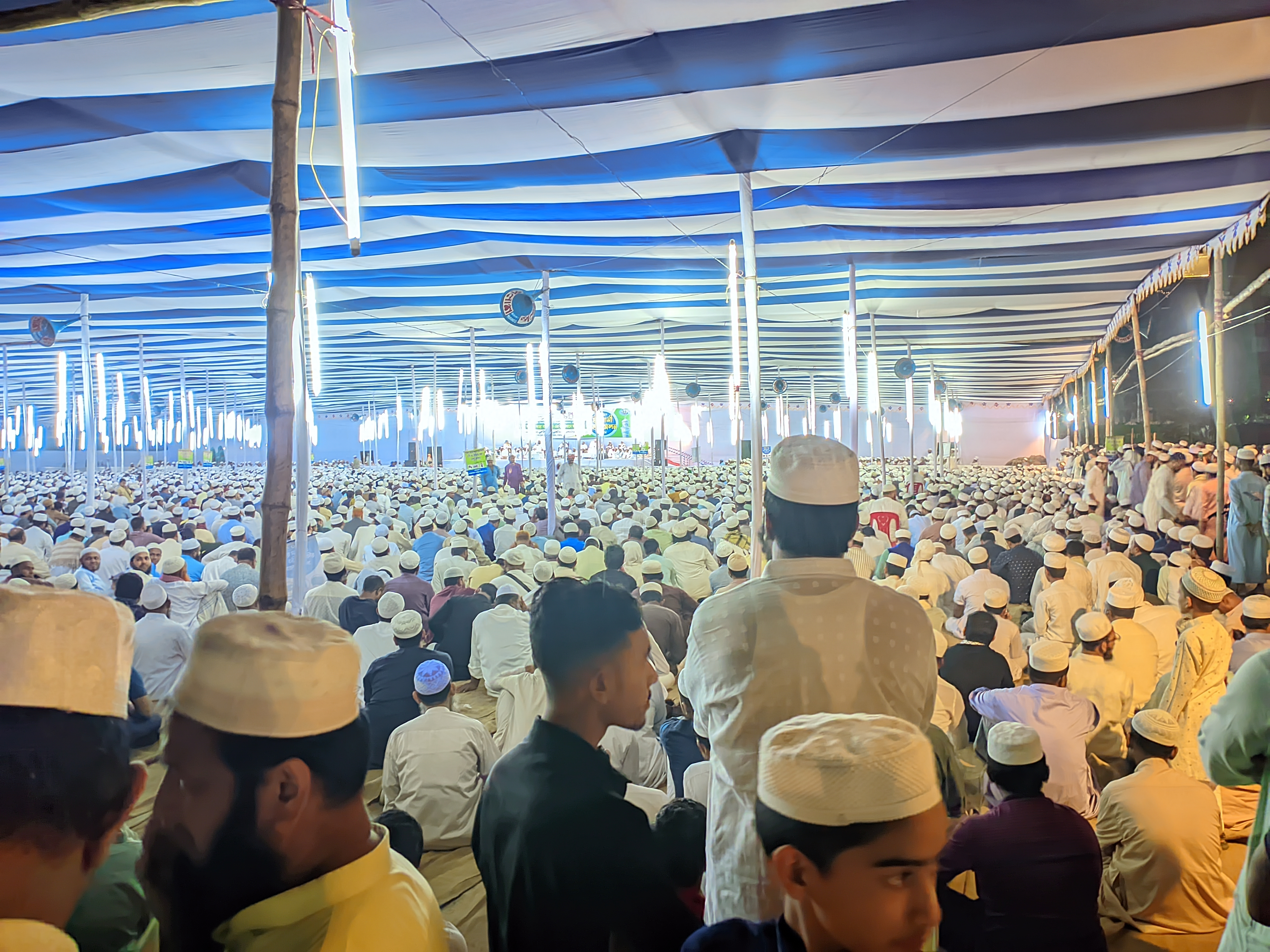
Ilyas Ghuman Addresses the 2024 International Islamic Conference at Jamiatul Falah Mosque, Bangladesh

Ghuman was born on 12 April 1969 in Sargodha District. He is a graduate of the Jamia Binoria.

In 2005, he was arrested for alleged involvement in the murder of Sargodha Division Commissioner Syed Tajamul Abbas. In 2006, he was again arrested related to the murder of Shia cleric Bashir Husain Bukhari.

In 2013, he was arrested by the police when he was touring Southern Punjab. In 2014, Aziz ur-Rahman Hazarvi gave his khilafat to Ghuman.

In August 2015, he was freed from house arrest. In October 2015, Ghuman was banned by the ICTA from delivering sermons in Muharram.

In August 2018, he published a book named Mera Pakistan.

== Books ==
Some of his books include:

- Firqah-yi Ahl-i ḥadīs̲ Pāk va Hind kā taḥqīqī jāʼizah, 2010, 374 p. Criticism of the Ahl-e Hadith.
- Firqah-yi Barailviyat Pāk va Hind kā taḥqīqī jāʼizah, 2012, 617 p. Criticism of the Barelvis.
- Maẓāmīn-i mutakallim-i Islām, 2012, multiple volumes. On miscellaneous issues of Islam; Islamic doctrines, collected articles published in various Urdu magazines.
- Majālis-i mutakallim-i Islām, 2013, 2 volumes. Sermons.
- Firqah-i Saifiyah kā taḥqīqī jāʼizah, 2013, 252 p. Criticism of Akhundzada Saif-ur-Rahman Mubarak (1925-2010), a Barelvi scholar.
- K̲h̲ut̤bāt-i mutakallim-i Islām, 2013, 3 volumes. Sermons.
- امت
- Mavāʻiz̤-i mutakkalim-i Islām, 2 volumes, 2013. Islamic sermons on religious life of Muslim women.
- Jihād fī sabīlilláh aur iʻtirāẓāt kā ʻilmī jāʼizah, 2014, 304 p. On jihad.
- Jī hān̲ Fiqah-i Ḥanafī Qurān va Ḥadīs̲ kā nacoṛ hai, 2014, 286 p. In defense of Hanafites with special reference to their views on various aspects of Islamic law.
- Kanz ul-īmān kā taḥqīqī jāʼizah, 2014, 242 p. Criticism of Kanzul Iman by Ahmed Raza Khan Barelvi.

== See also ==
- List of Deobandis
