= Khushal Khan Khattak Memorial Library =

Public library in Pakistan

- د خوشحال خان خټک یادگار کتابتون
- 33.99966460037615°N 72.13860015327657°E
- Location: Akora Khattak, Pakistan
- Type: public library
- Established: 1994

Khushal Khan Khattak Memorial Library is a public library in Akora Khattak, Pakistan. The library was constructed in memory of the famous Pashto poet Khushal Khan Khattak (also known as Khushal Baba) as he was born Akora Khattak. The library was established in 1994 by the Government of Pakistan. The library is composed of various segments, including the library itself, a museum (which is a sub-section of Peshawar Museum), an internet café and an auditorium. The planning on establishment of the library started in 1980s.

The library segment is further divided into three major sections based on the nature and literary genres of the materials:

- Urdu-Pashto (native linguistics) section
- English section
- Reference Section.

The library has a vast variety of literature and books.

Because this library is located in a small city that has a relatively low literacy rate, it does not have many visitors. It mainly attracts the attention of students and competitive examination aspirants e.g. CSS and PMS aspirants.
