= Belian =

Village in Khyber Pakhtunkhwa, Pakistan

Coordinates: 34°32′N 72°59′E

Belian Area of Lower Pakhli
- Union council and town
- Interactive map of Belian
- Country: Pakistan
- Province: Khyber Pakhtunkhwa

Population
  - Total: 4,000 (estimated)

Belian is a village in Pakistan's Khyber Pakhtunkhwa province. It is located in Oghi Tehsil and lies to the northeast of the district capital Mansehra it lies in a region devastated by the 2005 Kashmir earthquake, it lies 60 km east of the epicentre of the 2005 Kashmir earthquake.

Belian, a well-known and a largest land owning village Belian of Agror Valley, purely Pashto-speaking community, beliwal or beliani are the Swati Pashtuns and strongly hold Pakhtoonwali. Belian means fertile, because of the land's fertility and fruitfulness, Nawab of Amb state unsuccessfully attempted to seize the village three times in the late 19th century. Notable residents include there are five Jamia masjids, each have 300 capacity for the prayers at a single time. There is Hujra for the guests in the center of village. Its total population is about 4000.

There is a separate Primary school for boys and girls, Middle school for girls and high school for boys. Basic health unit (BHU) is located at the start of the village and a post office. There is branch of Madrasa Jamia Ulumia Saeedia Oghi for both boys and girls. The land is fertile and yields 66% of the total area including, rice, wheat, and fruits. The village is separated by the two rivers, flowing from the north and south direction and finally meets at a dam constructed at the east direction of the village.
