= Hamid Ul Haq Haqqani =

Pakistani politician and Islamic scholar (1968–2025)

- حامد الحق حقانی
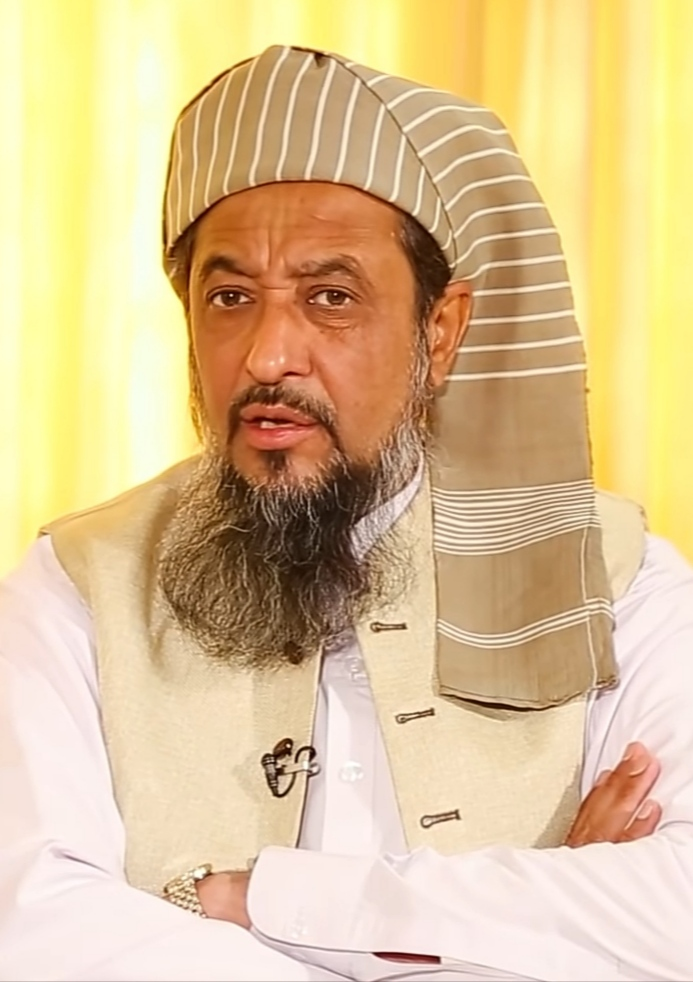
- Hamid Ul Haq in c. 2021

Member of the National Assembly of Pakistan
- In office 16 November 2002 – 2 October 2007
- Constituency: NA-6 (Nowshera-II)

Emir of JUI-S (1980–2025)
- In office 2 November 2018 – 28 February 2025
- Preceded by: Sami-ul-Haq
- Succeeded by: Abdul Haq Sani

Regional Chairperson of Difa-e-Pakistan Council
- In office 2007 – 28 February 2025
- Preceded by: Abdul Rashid Ghazi

Personal details
- Born: 26 May 1968 Akora Khattak, West Pakistan, Pakistan
- Died: 28 February 2025 (aged 56) Darul Uloom Haqqania, Khyber Pakhtunkhwa, Pakistan
- Cause of death: Assassination
- Party: JUI-S (1980–2025)
- Children: Abdul Haq Sani
- Parent: Sami ul Haq (father)
- Relatives: Abdul Haq Akorwi (grandfather); Rashid Ul Haq Haqqani (brother)
- Education: Darul Uloom Haqqania; Nowshera Degree College; Punjab University
- Occupation: Politician, Religious Scholar

Hamid ul Haq Haqqani (Urdu: مولانا حامد الحق حقانی; 26 May 1968 – 28 February 2025) was a Pakistani Islamic scholar and politician, who served as a member of the 12th National Assembly of Pakistan from 16 November 2002 until 10 October 2007, when he resigned in protest.

He became chief of the Jamiat Ulema-e-Islam (S) party after his father Sami ul Haq's assassination in 2018.

He was assassinated in a suicide bombing at Darul Uloom Haqqania.

== Background ==
Haqqani was born on 26 May 1968 in Akora Khattak, a town in the Nowshera District of Khyber Pakhtunkhwa, Pakistan. He was Sami-ul-Haq's second son from his first wife.

Haqqani received religious and school education from his grandfather, Abdul Haq Akorwi, while attending Haqqania High School, a school located inside the premises of the Darul Uloom Haqqania seminary. There he completed his Dars-i Nizami and became a scholar of the Hadith and the Quran.

He later enrolled in Nowshera Degree College, receiving a Bachelor’s in Islamic Studies before obtaining a master's degree in theology from Punjab University in the late 1980s.

== Political career ==
Haqqani joined and became secretary-general of the student wing of JUI (S), Jamiat Talba-e-Islam, in 1985. He was later appointed vice-emir of JUI (S) by the group's shura members in part due to his "prudence in political and religious affairs."

During the 2002 general election, Haqqani was elected to the 12th National Assembly of Pakistan on the ticket of the Muttahida Majlis-e-Amal coalition, beating Pakistan People's Party candidate Naseerullah Babar. He served as the representative of the NA-6 Nowshera-I seat from 2002 until 2007.

== Assassination ==
On 28 February 2025, a suicide bomb attack occurred at Darul Uloom Haqqania in Akora Khattak, Nowshera District, Khyber Pakhtunkhwa, Pakistan, following Friday prayers. The attack targeted Haqqani, who was among those killed. He was 56.

== See also ==
- List of Deobandis
