= Azizur Rahman Hazarvi =

Pakistani islamic scholar (1948–2020)

Aziz Ur Rahman Hazarvi
- عزیز الرحمٰن ہزاروی

Personal life
- Born: 2 February 1948 Battagram, British Raj
- Died: 23 June 2020 (aged 72) Islamabad, Pakistan
- Resting place: Jamia Darul Uloom Zakaria, Tarnol, Islamabad
- Home town: Battagram
- Children: Attiq-ur-Rehman; Owais Aziz; Muhammad zakria Aziz Abubakar Aziz Hazarvi
- Political party: Jamiat Ulema-e-Islam (F)
- Education: Darul Uloom Haqqania

Religious life
- Religion: Islam
- Denomination: Sunni
- Jurisprudence: Hanafi
- Movement: Deobandi

Aziz Ur Rahman Hazarvi (Note: Urdu: عزیز الرحمٰن ہزاروی) (2 February 1948 – 23 June 2020) was a Pakistani Islamic scholar and a senior leader of Jamiat Ulema-e-Islam (F), who was the founder of Jamia Darul Uloom Zakariya in Tarnol, Islamabad.

He was a disciple of Zakariyya Kandhlawi and authorized various people in the Chishti branch of Tasawwuf. His notable disciples include Muhammad Ilyas Ghuman.

== Biography ==
Hazarvi was among the disciples of Zakariyya Kandhlawi. He was a member of Wifaq ul Madaris Al-Arabia and a senior leader of Jamiat Ulama-e-Islam.

He supervised the Islamabad unit of the Jamiat Ulama-e-Islamand established Darul Uloom Zakariya in Tarnol, Islamabad.

== Death ==
Aged 72, Hazarvi died on 23 June 2020. His funeral prayer was led by Syed Mukhtaruddin Shah. Jamiat Ulema-e-Islam (F) leader, Fazlur Rehman, Abdul Ghafoor Haideri and Maulana Abdul Wasay expressed sorrow and grief over his demise.

His funeral was attended by scholars including Syed Adnan Kakakhail.

== See more ==
- List of Deobandis
