= Sami-ul-Haq =

Pakistani politician and Islamic scholar (1937–2018)

Mawlānā Sami ul Haq
- سمیع الحق
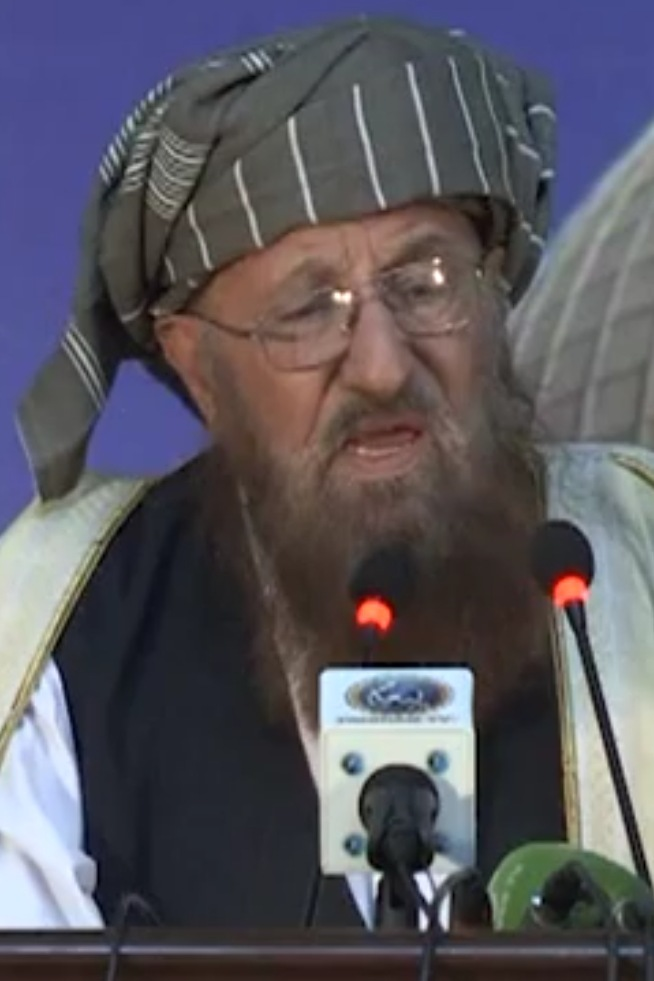
- Sami-ul-Haq in 2017.

Ameer of Jamiat Ulema-e-Islam (S)
- In office 1980 – 2 November 2018
- Preceded by: Mufti Mahmud
- Succeeded by: Maulana Hamid Ul Haq Haqqani

President of Difa-e-Pakistan Council
- In office September 2001 – 2 November 2018
- Preceded by: None (office created)
- Succeeded by: Ahmed Ludhianvi

2nd Chancellor of Darul Uloom Haqqania
- In office 7 September 1988 – 2 November 2018
- Preceded by: Abdul Haq
- Succeeded by: Anwar-ul-Haq Haqqani

Pakistan Senator for North-West Frontier Province
- In office March 2003 – March 2009; February 1985 – March 1997

Member of Pakistan 1981 Majlis-e-Shoora
- In office 1983–1985

Personal details
- Born: 18 December 1937 Akora Khattak, NWFP, British India
- Died: 2 November 2018 (aged 79) Rawalpindi, Punjab, Pakistan
- Cause of death: Assassination by stabbings
- Party: JUI-S (1980-2018); Difa-e-Pakistan Council (2001-2018)
- Other political affiliations: Jamiat Ulema-e-Islam (before 1980); Islami Jamhoori Ittehad (before 1993)
- Children: Hamid Ul Haq Haqqani Rashid Ul Haq Haqqani
- Parent: Abdul Haq (father)
- Education: Darul Uloom Haqqania

Sami-ul-Haq (Note: Urdu: سمیع الحق, romanized: Samī'u’l-Ḥaq) (18 December 1937 – 2 November 2018) was a Pakistani Islamic scholar and politician. He is regarded as the ideologue of the Taliban for his role in his seminary Darul Uloom Haqqania played in the graduation of most Taliban leaders and commanders, having close ties to Taliban leader Mullah Omar.

With his party Jamiat Ulema-e-Islam (S), which split from Jamiat Ulema-e-Islam (F) because Haq supported Zia-ul-Haq and his policies, he was a member of the Senate of Pakistan from 1985 to 1991 and again from 1991 to 1997.

Sami-ul-Haq was assassinated after being stabbed multiple times at his residence in Bahria Town, Rawalpindi. After his assassination in 2018 his son Hamid Ul Haq Haqqani became the chancellor of the seminary and the ameer or head of the political party.

== Early life and family ==
Haq was born on 18 December 1937 in Akora Khattak, North-West Frontier Province of British India (now Khyber Pakhtunkhwa, Pakistan). His father was Abdul Haq Akorwi, who was educated at Darul Uloom Deoband in India. He began his education in 1366 AH (1946 or 1947 CE) at Darul Uloom Haqqania, which was founded by his father. He was well versed in Arabic but also used Urdu, the national language of Pakistan, and the regional language of Pashto.

He had four brothers, including Anwarul Haq Haqqani, responsible of the seminary’s administration, and Mehmood Ul Haq Haqqani, who was professor of chemistry at the Peshawar University and who also served as Pakistan’s deputy ambassador to Saudi Arabia, while he himself married twice and had nine children.

== Career ==
=== Ties with the Afghan Taliban ===
Sami-ul-Haq was regarded as the ideologue of the Taliban and had close ties to Taliban leader Mullah Mohammed Omar. Sami-ul-Haq was the chancellor of Darul Uloom Haqqania, a Deobandi Islamic seminary which is the alma mater of many prominent Taliban members. Haq served as chairman of the Difa-e-Pakistan Council and was the leader of his own faction of the Jamiat Ulema-e-Islam political party, known as JUI-S. Sami ul-Haq was also a founding member of a six-party religious alliance Muttahida Majlis-e-Amal ahead of 2002 general election.

He had also served as a member of the Senate of Pakistan. He formed Muttahida Deeni Mahaz (United Religious Front), an alliance of relatively small religio-political parties, to participate in the 2013 general election.

Haq stated that the US Ambassador to Pakistan, Richard G. Olson, visited him in July 2013 to discuss the situation of the region. Haq sympathized with the Taliban, stating: "Give them just one year and they will make the whole of Afghanistan happy... The whole of Afghanistan will be with them ... Once the Americans leave, all of this will happen within a year... As long as they are there, Afghans will have to fight for their freedom," Haq said. "It's a war for freedom. It will not stop until outsiders leave."

In October 2018, an Afghan delegation comprising Ashraf Ghani government representatives and diplomats stationed in Pakistan, met Samiul Haq asking him to play a role in restoring peace in Afghanistan by bringing the Afghan Taliban back to the dialogue table.

=== Fatwa on polio vaccination ===
After Tehreek-e-Taliban Pakistan (TTP) initiated a campaign against polio immunisation, forcing hundreds of thousands of children to miss vaccinations, on 9 December 2013 Sami ul-Haq issued a fatwa in favor of polio vaccination. The fatwa said "vaccination against deadly diseases is helpful in their prevention according to research conducted by renowned medical specialists. It adds that the vaccines used against these diseases are in no way harmful".

== Assassination ==
On 2 November 2018, Sami-ul-Haq was stabbed multiple times at around 7:00 pm PST at his residence in Bahria Town, Rawalpindi. He was taken to the nearby Safari Hospital where he was pronounced dead on arrival. The cause of his death was excessive blood loss due to the multiple stabbing across his body, including his face. According to his guard, he had intended to join the protests against the acquittal of Asia Bibi in Islamabad, but he could not join it due to road blockage.

Following the assassination, the Khyber Pakhtunkhwa government declared a day of mourning. Prime Minister Imran Khan condemned the murder saying "the country has suffered a great loss".

On 3 November 2018, he was buried in the premises of Darul Uloom Haqqania in his hometown of Akora Khattak in the afternoon. The funeral prayer was offered at the Khushal Khan Degree College and led by his son Hamid Ul Haq Haqqani. It was attended by a large number of political leaders and his followers.

As part of the investigation into his murder, the police questioned his domestic staff.

== Books ==
The editor-in-chief of the monthly journal Al-Haq until his death, he has been described as "a prolific Islamist writer" who "authored more than 20 books", some of his works including:

- Islām Aur ʻAṣr-i Hāz̤ir, 1976. On Islam and the modern world, collected articles.
- Qādiyān Sey Isrāʼīl Tak, 1978. Critical assessment of the Ahmadiyya movement.
- Kārvān-i Āk̲h̲irat, 1990. Collection of condolence letters on the death of various South Asian religious scholars.
- Ṣalibī Dahshatgardī Aur ʻĀlam-i Islām, 2004. Collection of interviews discussing Taliban movement, United States of America and West interests in Afghanistan.
- Qādiyānī Fitnah Aur Millat-i Islāmiyah Kā Mauʼqqif , 2011. Criticism of the Ahmadiyya movement, co-authored with Taqi Usmani.
- K̲h̲ut̤bāt-i Mashāhīr, 2015. Collected sermons on religious life in Islam, Islam and conduct of life and Islam and politics, in 10 volumes.
- Afghan Taliban: War of Ideology : Struggle for Peace, 2015. His last notable book, on the peace process in Afghanistan.
