= Abdul Haq Akorwi =

Pakistani Islamic scholar (1912–1988)

Abdul Haq عبد الحق

1st Chancellor of Darul Uloom Haqqania
- In office 23 September 1947 – 7 September 1988
- Succeeded by: Sami-ul-Haq

Member of the National Assembly

Assembly Member for Peshawar Division
- In office 14 April 1972 – 10 January 1974; In office 26 March 1977 – 5 July 1977; In office 20 March 1985 – 29 May 1988

Personal details
- Born: 11 January 1912 Akora Khattak, NWFP, British India (present-day Khyber Pakhtunkhwa, Pakistan)
- Died: 7 September 1988 (aged 76) Peshawar, NWFP, Pakistan (present-day Khyber Pakhtunkhwa, Pakistan)
- Party: Jamiat Ulema-e-Islam
- Children: Sami-ul-Haq (son)
- Education: Darul Uloom Deoband
- Occupation: Islamic scholar, Teacher, Politician
- Awards: Sitara-i-Imtiaz (Star of Distinction) by the President of Pakistan in 1981; Honorary PhD in Divinity, University of Peshawar

Abdul Haq (Urdu: عبدالحق, Pashto: عبدالحق; 11 January 1912 – 7 September 1988), also known as Abdul Haq Akorwi, was a Pakistani Deobandi Islamic scholar, who was the founder and Sheikh al-Hadith of the Islamic seminary Darul Uloom Haqqania and had also served as vice-president of Wifaq ul Madaris Al-Arabia, Pakistan.

He was involved in politics as a member of the political party Jamiat Ulema-e-Islam. He served three times in the National Assembly of Pakistan and was an active proponent of the Khatme Nabuwwat movement.

Abdul Haq completed his religious education at Darul Uloom Deoband in Deoband, India. He taught at Deoband for four years until difficulties arose due to the independence of Pakistan.

In 1947, he founded Darul Uloom Haqqania in Akora Khattak, one of the first Islamic seminaries to be established in Pakistan. He taught hadith at the madrasah for the rest of his life and was well known by the title "Shaykh al-Hadith".

His son, Sami ul Haq, succeeded him as chancellor of Darul Uloom Haqqania. Abdul Haq's sermons have been published by his son in two volumes containing over 1,300 pages, entitled Da`wat-i Haq.

== Education ==
Abdul Haq was born in the city of Akora Khattak, Peshawar District, North-West Frontier Province (NWFP), British India, the son of Haji Maruf Gul, a local landlord, businessman, and religious scholar. According to family belief, Abdul Haq was born in 1912 or 1914. Muhammad Akbar Shah Bukhari, however, writes in Akabir Ulama-i Deoband that he was born on "7 Muharram al-Haram 1327 AH, Sunday, corresponding to January 1910". This is an error since Sunday 7 Muharram 1327 corresponds to 31 January 1909, not 1910. Another source gives his date of birth as 7 Muharram 1330 AH (c. 29 December 1911). His nasab (patronymic) is given as follows: Shaykhul-Ḥadīs̱ Mawlānā ‘Abdul-Ḥaqq ibn Akhūnzādah al-Ḥājj Mawlānā Muḥammad Ma‘rūf Gul ibn Akhūnzādah al-Ḥājj Mawlānā Mīr Aftāb ibn Akhūnzādah Mawlānā ‘Abdul-Ḥamīd ibn Mawlānā ‘Abdur-Raḥīm Akhūnkhel ibn Mawlānā ‘Abdul-Wāḥid Akhūnkhel.

Abdul Haq received his early education from his parents. Then for elementary religious studies, he was sent to nearby places in Peshawar, Mardan, and Chhachh. In Mardan, he studied with Inayatullah and Abdul Jamil. Until the age of 16, he had studied locally the books up to Mulla Hasan. For higher studies he traveled further, studying first in madrasahs in Meerut, Amroha, Gulavati, and Calcutta before gaining admission to the prestigious Darul Uloom Deoband in Shawwal 1347 (March 1929). Abdul Haq writes of the difficulty he faced in admission, "I arrived at Deoband at such a time when the Bengali and Swati students had quarreled and there was no flexibility in admission policy for Pathan students. I also had to face the problem of admission."

He completed daurah of hadith, the final stage of the Dars-i Nizami curriculum, under the supervision of Hussain Ahmad Madani, receiving his sanad-i faraghat (graduate degree) in 1352 AH (1933/1934). Some of his other teachers included Rasul Khan Hazarvi, Muhammad Ibrahim Baliyawi, and Muhammad Shafi.

== Teaching career ==
Abdul Haq returned to Akora Khattak and, on the instruction of his father, opened a small madrasah in a mosque adjacent to his house in order to provide a basic and religious education to the children in the area. In 1937, he began a primary school which was inaugurated by Husain Ahmad Madani. Soon, the number of students increased and other teachers were appointed.

Abdul Haq was later offered a teaching post at Darul Uloom Deoband by Madani. After consulting with his father, he joined Darul Uloom Deoband in Shawwal 1362 AH (October 1943).

In 1947, Abdul Haq had returned to Akora Khattak during the Ramadan vacation. After the independence of Pakistan in 1947, his father did not agree to him returning to Deoband, despite Madani's persuasion and promise of security. Consequently, Abdul Haq founded Darul Uloom Haqqania in Akora Khattak on 23 September 1947. In the first year, many madrasah students who were unable to return to India came to Darul Uloom Haqqania to complete daurah of hadith with Abdul Haq. At first he was the sole teacher and had to teach all the books of the Dars-i Nizami curriculum himself, but over time the number of students grew and other teachers joined. Abdul Haq continued to teach hadith at the school until his death in 1988.

Abdul Haq also served as the convener of Wifaq al-Madaris al-Arabiya.

== Politics ==
Abdul Haq joined other Islamic graduates in forming the Pakistani political party Jamiat Ulema-e-Islam (JUI), which endeavored for the implementation of Islamic law in the country.

Abdul Haq was elected to the National Assembly of Pakistan in three consecutive elections, his election campaigns being led by his son, Sami ul Haq. In 1970, running on the JUI ticket, Abdul Haq was elected to the 5th National Assembly, defeating Ajmal Khattak of the National Awami Party and Nasrullah Khan Khattak of the Pakistan Peoples Party (PPP). In the 1977 general election, he was elected to the 6th National Assembly, running on the ticket of the Pakistan National Alliance, a nine-party alliance including JUI. He again defeated Nasrullah Khan Khattak, then Chief Minister of NWFP and provincial president of the PPP. He was elected to the 7th National Assembly in the 1985 general election, which was held on a non-party basis.

== Khatme Nabuwwat movement ==
Abdul Haq was active in the Khatme Nabuwwat movement. In his lectures, he stressed the importance of the concept of finality of prophethood and argued against the interpretations of Quranic verses and hadiths used by Ahmadis to support their beliefs. He was one of the signatories of the resolution moved on 30 June 1974 in the National Assembly in support of declaring Ahmadis as non-Muslims in Pakistan.

== Soviet–Afghan War ==
When the Soviets invaded Afghanistan in 1979, Abdul Haq declared the Afghan resistance to be a jihad and an ideological struggle between Islam and communism. The ruling stating this was issued by Darul Uloom Haqqania. Abdul Haq made monetary contributions in support of the Afghan Mujahideen and prayed for their success. On many occasions, he expressed his desire to fight, but he was unable to do so due to his old age and failing health.

== Sufism ==
Abdul Haq was a disciple of Haji Sahib Turangzai. He gave bay'ah at the hands of other Sufis including Hussain Ahmad Madani, Khawaja Abdul Malik Siddiqi, and the Faqir of Ipi.

== Awards and achievements ==
- In October 1978, Abdul Haq was awarded an honorary PhD in Divinity from the University of Peshawar for services rendered in the cause of Islam.
- Sitara-i-Imtiaz (Star of Distinction) by the President of Pakistan, General Zia-ul-Haq, for his religious, educational, and scholarly achievements.

== Death ==
Abdul Haq died on 7 September 1988, at the age of 74 or 76, at Khyber Hospital in Peshawar, North-West Frontier Province, Pakistan.

== See also ==
- List of Deobandis
