= Darul Uloom Haqqania =

Islamic religious seminary in northern Pakistan

Jamia Darul Uloom Haqqania
- جامعہ دار العلوم حقانیہ
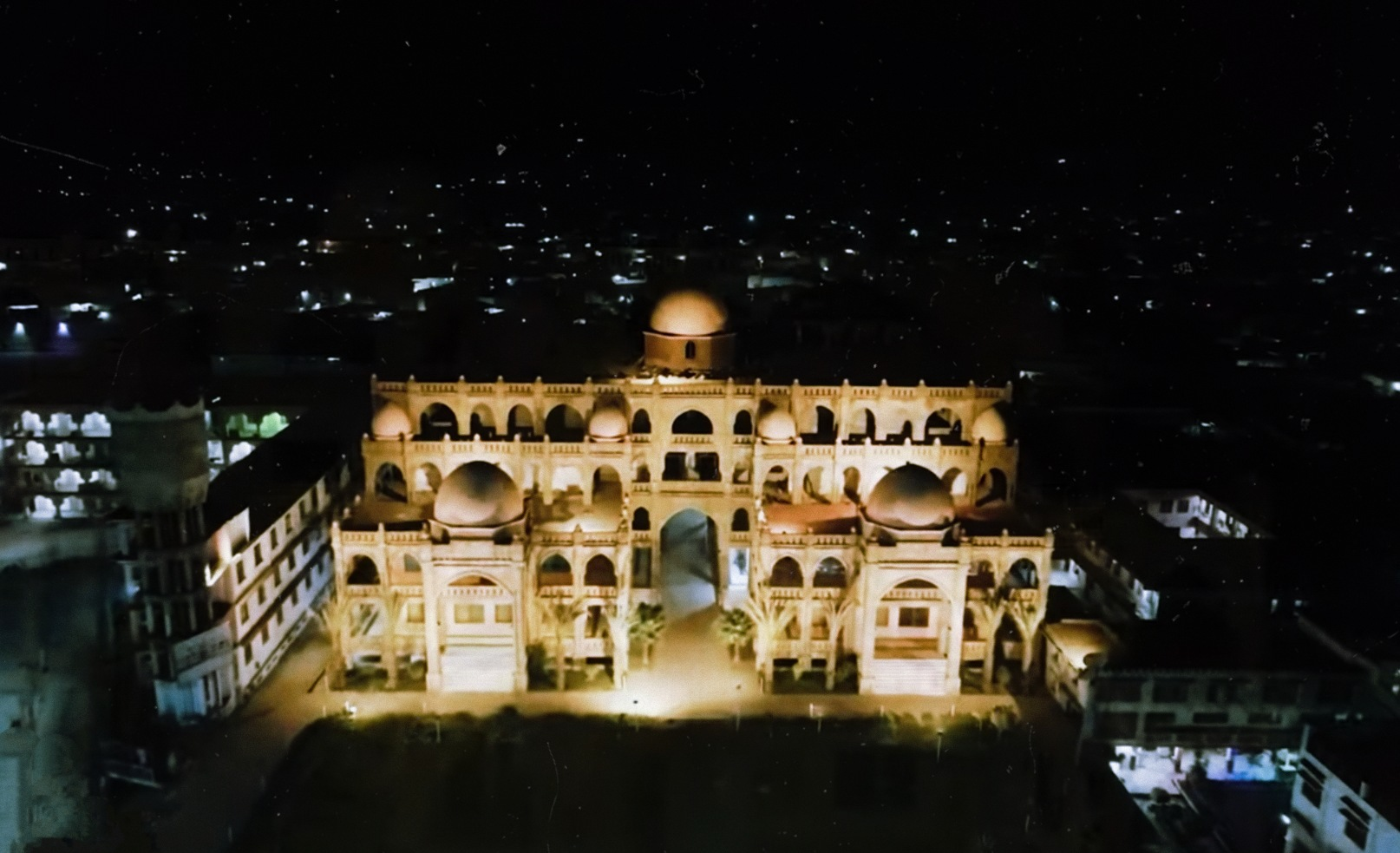
- Type: Islamic university (Darul uloom and Madrasa)
- Established: 23 September 1947; 78 years ago
- Founder: Abdul Haq Akorwi
- Affiliations: Jamiat Ulema-e-Islam (S); Wifaq ul Madaris
- Religious affiliation: Sunni Islam (Hanafi Deobandi)
- Chancellor: Abdul Haq Akorwi (1947–1988); Sami-ul-Haq (1988–2018); Anwar-ul-Haq (2018–present)
- Vice-Chancellor: Rashid Ul Haq (2018–present)
- Students: 4,000 (2016)
- Location: 34.00023 N, 72.12175 E, Akora Khattak, Khyber Pakhtunkhwa, Pakistan

Jamia Darul Uloom Haqqania (Urdu: جامعہ دار العلوم حقانیہ) is an Islamic seminary (Note: also referred to as a Darul uloom or Madrasa) in the town of Akora Khattak, Khyber Pakhtunkhwa province, northwestern Pakistan.

The seminary propagates the Hanafi Deobandi school of Sunni Islam. It was founded by Abdul Haq Akorwi along the lines of the Darul Uloom Deoband seminary in India, where he had taught.

It has been dubbed the "University of Jihad" due to the future occupations of its alumni. A number of leading members of the Taliban, including past chief Akhtar Mansour and leader of Haqqani network, Sirajuddin Haqqani studied here.

== History ==
The seminary was founded on 23 September 1947 by Maulana Abdul Haq in Akora Khattak, making it one of the first Islamic seminaries established in Pakistan. Haq was a graduate and former teacher of Darul Uloom Deoband in India.

Abdul Haq served as the new institution's chancellor and its Shaykh al-Hadith and was recognized for his lifelong dedication to teaching the Hadith at the madrasah.

He was succeeded as chancellor by his son, Sami-ul-Haq, a leader of the Jamiat Ulema-e-Islam. Sami-ul-Haq, often referred to as the "Father of the Taliban," was recognized for his role in educating many Taliban leaders and commanders. He maintained close ties to Taliban founder Mullah Mohammed Omar. Under his leadership, the seminary became known as the alma mater of numerous prominent Taliban members. also among his notable students is Maulana Fazl-ur-Rehman, who later became the emir of the Jamiat Ulema-e-Islam (F).

In November 2018, Sami-ul-Haq was assassinated at his residence in Bahria Town, Rawalpindi. The attack occurred at approximately 7:00 p.m. PST. He died from excessive blood loss after being stabbed multiple times.

Following the assassination, the Khyber Pakhtunkhwa government declared a National day of mourning. Prime Minister Imran Khan condemned the murder saying "the country has suffered a great loss".

In 2018, following the assassination of Sami-ul-Haq, Islamic scholars including figures like Ahmad Ludhianvi, Abdur Razzaq Iskander and Fazal-ur-Rehman convened at Akora Khattak, Khyber Pakhtunkhwa and unanimously appointed his brother, Anwar-ul-Haq Haqqani, as the new chancellor of Darul Uloom Haqqania.

His younger brother, Rashid Ul Haq Sami, was appointed to the post of vice-chancellor. He succeeded Anwar-ul-Haq, who previously held the position. while position of Emir within the Jamiat Ulema-e-Islam (S) was passed to Sami-ul-Haq's son Hamid Ul Haq.

=== 2025 bombing ===
On 28 February 2025, a suicide bombing occurred in the seminary. The attack took place during Friday prayers, resulting in the deaths of at least six individuals, including the prominent cleric and deputy head of the seminary, Hamid Ul Haq Haqqani.

In 2025, following the assassination of Hamid Ul Haq, Islamic scholars appointed his son, Abdul Haq Sani, as the new emir of Jamiat Ulema-e-Islam (S).

== Functioning and selection process ==
The seminary operates a large boarding school and high school serving thousands of students, alongside a network of 12 affiliated smaller madrassas.

Its academic program offers an eight-year Master of Arts in Islamic studies, which can be followed by a PhD after two additional years. According to journalist Ahmed Rashid, it is considered the most popular madrassa in northern Pakistan.

Admission is highly competitive; for example, in February 1999, only 400 new students were accepted from 15,000 applicants. The institution also reserves 400 places for Afghan students.

== Notable alumni ==
The seminary is known for producing graduates who went on to become Islamist insurgents in Afghanistan, firstly mujahideen who fought against the Soviet Union in the Soviet–Afghan War, and later members of the Taliban, including senior leaders.

Notable graduates include the following:

- Maulana Fazl-ur-Rehman, Emir of the Jamiat Ulema-e-Islam (F).
- Mohammad Yunus Khalis (c. 1919–2006), important mujahideen commander
- Jalaluddin Haqqani (1939–2018), founding leader of the Haqqani network
- Akhtar Mansoor (c. 1968–2016), former leader of the Taliban
- Sirajuddin Haqqani, minister of interior of the Islamic Emirate of Afghanistan
- Mullah Omar, founding leader of the Taliban, did not study there, but was granted an honorary doctorate
- Azizur Rahman Hazarvi, senior leader of Jamiat Ulema-e-Islam (F).
- Muhammad Fareed, Shaykh al-Hadith of Darul Uloom Haqqania.
- Muhammad Musa Ruhani Bazi, Prominent philosopher and author.
- Naeem Wardak, Deputy Minister of Foreign Affairs of Islamic Emirate of Afghanistan
- Syed Sher Ali Shah, Pashtun Islamic scholar.
- Ghulam Ur Rehman, Chairman of Higher Education Commission Khyber Pakhtunkhwa.

== Geopolitical role: Afghanistan, the Taliban, and regional diplomacy ==
=== The Soviet–Afghan War era (1979–1989) ===
During the Soviet–Afghan War, Darul Uloom Haqqania served as a prominent organisational and networking base for anti-Soviet Afghan fighters. From 1973, Pakistan's Inter-Services Intelligence (ISI) began arming and training Afghan Islamists through Brigadier Naseerullah Babar, the then Inspector-General of the Frontier Corps, and the seminary became a hub for jihadists who used Peshawar as a base for operations. The seminary was also among the institutions that Pakistani and United States intelligence agencies utilised to channel fighters for the anti-Soviet jihad. Scholars Don Rassler and Vahid Brown have noted that from 1966 to 1988, a third of all Pakistani clerics of the Deobandi theological school graduated from Darul Uloom Haqqania. The influx of Afghan students during this period markedly shaped the seminary's character and created alumni networks that would later form the backbone of the Taliban movement.

=== Taliban governance in Afghanistan (1996–2001) ===
A substantial number of Taliban commanders and ministers who governed Afghanistan between 1996 and 2001 were alumni of Darul Uloom Haqqania. In a book authored in 2015, Chancellor Sami-ul-Haq himself wrote that approximately 90 percent of the religiously educated persons in the Taliban government had graduated from Haqqania or were wards of its graduates, describing the institution as the "nursery of Taliban". Notable alumni from this period include Sirajuddin Haqqani (current acting Interior Minister of Afghanistan), Noor Mohammad Saqib (acting Minister of Hajj and Awqaf), and Shahabuddin Delawar (former Minister of Minerals and Petroleum). Mullah Omar, the founder of the Taliban, though not a registered student of the seminary, was awarded an honorary doctorate by the institution — an act widely interpreted as the seminary's spiritual endorsement of Taliban leadership.

=== Post-2001: Intermediary between Pakistan and the Taliban ===
After the US-led invasion of Afghanistan in 2001, Darul Uloom Haqqania continued to function as an unofficial diplomatic back-channel between Pakistani authorities and the Taliban. Maulana Sami-ul-Haq's personal relationships with senior Taliban figures allowed Pakistani governments to use the institution's leadership as informal mediators. Raashid Salah Uddin Siddiqui, a noted analyst on Taliban affairs, stated that "Maulana Sami-ul-Haq has long been serving as mediator between Taliban and the rest of the world." In 2013, Sami-ul-Haq met Afghan President Hamid Karzai, who sought his assistance for peace and reconciliation efforts in Afghanistan. In October 2018, shortly before his assassination, the Afghan government sent a delegation to the seminary formally requesting Sami-ul-Haq to mediate between the Kabul government and the Taliban; the delegation included former governor of Nangarhar province Ataullah Lodin, and earlier that year Afghan President Ashraf Gani had directly sought Sami-ul-Haq's assistance in arranging talks. Senior diplomats and officials from multiple governments travelled to Akora Khattak to seek his intercession with Taliban leadership throughout this period.

=== Post-Taliban takeover (2021–present) ===
Following the Taliban seizure of power in Afghanistan in August 2021, the alumni connection between the seminary and the Afghan government became even more prominent. Graduates of Darul Uloom Haqqania assumed multiple senior positions in the Taliban's interim cabinet, including Sirajuddin Haqqani as acting Interior Minister, Amir Khan Muttaqi as acting Foreign Minister, Abdul Baqi Haqqani as Higher Education Minister, and Noor Mohammad Saqib as acting Minister of Hajj and Religious Affairs, among others. School administrators confirmed that the justice minister, the water and energy minister, and various governors, military commanders and judges were also alumni of the institution. Vice-chancellor Rashid-ul-Haq Sami stated at the time: "Being the graduation place of thousands of Taliban militants, Haqqania demands their respect." This degree of alumni representation in a foreign government gave the seminary a de facto advisory and relational role in Afghanistan's post-2021 governance, making it one of the most geopolitically influential non-state religious institutions in South Asia.

== See also ==
- Madrassas in Pakistan
- Jamiat Ulema-e-Islam (S)
- Soviet–Afghan War
