= Jamiat Ulema-e-Islam =

Defunct political party in Pakistan

Jamiat Ulema-e-Islam جمیعت علماءِ اسلام
- Abbreviation: JUI
- Historical leaders: Shabbir Ahmad Usmani; Zafar Ahmad Usmani; Ahmad Ali Lahori; Abdullah Darkhawasti; Mufti Mahmud; Abdul Haq Akorwi; Ghulam Ghaus Hazarvi
- Founder: Shabbir Ahmad Usmani
- Founded: 26 October 1945; 80 years ago
- Split from: Jamiat Ulema-e-Hind
- Succeeded by: Jamiat Ulema-e-Islam (F); Jamiat Ulema-e-Islam (S); Jamiat Ulema-e-Islam Bangladesh; Sipah-e-Sahaba Pakistan
- Ideology: Islamism; Islamic fundamentalism Religious nationalism Religious conservatism Pro-Pakistan
- Political position: Far-right
- Religion: Sunni Islam (Deobandi)

Election symbol
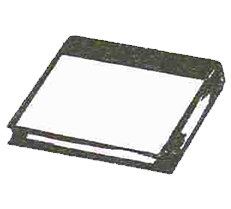
- Book

Party flag

Jamiat Ulema-e-Islam (Urdu: جمیعت علماءِ اسلام, abbreviated as JUI, translated as Assembly of Islamic Clergy) is a Deobandi Sunni Muslim organisation that was founded on 26 October 1945 by Shabbir Ahmad Usmani as a pro-Pakistan offshoot of the Jamiat Ulema-e-Hind (JUH). It has run candidates for office in Pakistani provincial and national elections, and splintered into several groups in 1980, 2007, and 2020.

In March 2019, after the decline of a competing faction JUI-S, the Election Commission of Pakistan reportedly allowed Moulana Fazal-ur-Rehman to have his JUI-F party use the old name of Jamiat Ulema-e-Islam with no added letter F.

== History ==
=== Background ===
Jamiat Ulema-e-Islam (JUI-F) is a Deobandi organisation, part of the Deobandi movement. The JUI formed when members broke from the Jamiat Ulema-e-Hind in 1945 after that organisation against the Muslim League's lobby for a separate Pakistan the Splinter member's formed the Jamiat Ulema-e-Islam as a breakaway faction of Jamiat Ulema-e-Hind and backed the Muslim League's idea of separate Muslim nation, The Jamiat Ulema-e-Islam pledge allegiance to Muhammad Ali Jinnah and announce openly support to Pakistan movement under the leadership of Shabbir Ahmad Usmani, Who was the Deobandi Islamic scholar he was one of the founding members of Jamia Millia Islamia, New Delhi and a former member of the Jamiat Ulema-e-Hind In 1944, he became a member of the Muslim League who supported the creation of Pakistan.

The original Jamiat Ulema-e-Hind was formed in British India in 1919. After the death of Shabbir Ahmad Usmani in 1949, his close associate Zafar Ahmad Usmani replaced him as head or Amir of JUH. Then Mufti Mahmud became Amir of this party in 1962 and remained its head until his death in 1980.

After the death of Mufti Mahmud, the group was further divided during Muhammad Zia-ul-Haq regime, namely Jamiat Ulema-e-Islam (S) supporting Jihadism and a totalitarian state whereas Jamiat Ulema-e-Islam (F) supporting the movement for restoration of democracy in Pakistan. In Pakistan, the JUI was active in the anti-Ahmadiyya riots in 1953 and 1974 and anti-Shia agitations. Part of the JUI's agenda has also been to establish a "pure" Islam in Pakistan. In particular, the JUI has sought to eliminate the worship of saints and other un-Islamic practices.

=== Factions ===
- Jamiat Ulema-e-Islam Bangladesh – headed by Zia Uddin, was founded in 1972 following the Bangladesh War of Independence.

Following the death of Mufti Mehmood Ahmed in 1980 JUI split in two:

- Jamiat Ulema-e-Islam (F) – headed by Fazal-ur-Rehman JUI-F is almost entirely based in southern Khyber Pakhtunkhwa and northern Balochistan, which are mostly inhabited by Pashtuns. The assassination of the head of splinter faction (JUI-S) in 2018 led to the diminishing of that faction, and to Moulana Fazal-ur-Rehman being successful in pleading before Election Commission of Pakistan (ECP) to get his JUI-F faction renamed as JUI in March 2019. As of 2021 (at least) it was "the biggest religio-political party" in Pakistan, with "proven street power", and is still commonly referred to as JUI (F) despite being registered with the Election Commission of Pakistan as simply JUI.
- Jamiat Ulema-e-Islam (S) – headed by Hamid Ul Haq Haqqani split with JUI (F) in 1980 and supports Jihadism and a totalitarian state and also Zia's regime is of regional significance in Khyber Pakhtunkhwa but has no representation on the national level. Sami-ul-Haq was assassinated in 2018 and his son, Maulana Hamid-ul-Haq Haqqani became its chief, but the group reportedly has much less support now. Hamid Ul Haq Haqqani was killed in a suicide bombing in 2025

A faction known as JUI Nazryati split from JUI-F in 2007 and merged back again in 2016.

- Jamiat Ulama-e-Islam Nazryati – headed by Maulvi Asmatullah. JUI-N was open in its support for the Afghan Taliban and Al Qaeda, but suffered a severe defeat in the 2013 general election.
- Rabita Jamiat Ulema-e-Islam – headed by Muhammad Khan Sherani was established in December 2020 as a breakway faction of Jamiat Ulema-e-Islam (F) (JUI-F) over rifts with Fazal-ur-Rehman, It has declared alliance with Imran Khan and his party, the Pakistan Tehreek-e-Insaf, JUI Pakistan also supports Afghan Taliban led government in Afghanistan.

== Electoral history ==
Election	Leader	Picture	Votes	%	Seats	+/–
1970	Mufti Mehmood		1,315,071	3.98%	7 / 131	▲7
1977	Mufti Mehmood		286,313	1.69%	7 / 200	Steady

== Officials ==
=== President/Ameer ===
Name	Assumed office	Left office	Source
Shabbir Ahmad Usmani	1945	1949	
Zafar Ahmad Usmani	1949	1956	
Ahmed Ali Lahori	1956	1962	
Abdullah Darkhawasti	1962	1968	
Mufti Mehmood	1968	1980	
Fazal-ur-Rehman	1980	Present	

== See also ==
- List of Deobandi organisations
