= Jamiat Ulema-e-Islam – F =

Pakistani political party

Jamiat Ulema-e-Islam – Fazal جمیعت علماءِ اسلام – فضل الرحمان Assembly of Islamic Clerics
- Abbreviation: JUI–F
- Leader: Fazal-ur-Rehman
- General Secretary: Maulana Abdul Ghafoor Haideri
- Spokesperson: Aslam Ghauri
- Vice President: Atta Ur Rehman
- Leader in National Assembly of Pakistan: Fazal-ur-Rehman
- Founder: Shabbir Ahmad Usmani (founded JUI)
- Founded: 1945; 81 years ago
- Preceded by: JUI
- Headquarters: Islamabad, Pakistan
- Student wing: Jamiat Talba-e-Islam (JTI)
- Women's wing: Jamiat Ulema-e-Islam Women Wing
- Volunteer Wing: Tanzeem Ansar-ul-Islam
- Lawyers Wing: Jamiat Lawyers Forum
- Teachers Wing: Wahdat-e-Asaatza
- Doctors Wing: Islamic Doctors Forum
- Membership: 4.4 million (2025)
- Ideology: Islamic fundamentalism; Islamism
- Political position: Far-right
- Religion: Sunni Islam (Deobandi)
- National affiliation: MMA; PDM; TTAP
- Colors: Black (official); Green (customary)
- Senate of Pakistan: 7 / 96
- National Assembly of Pakistan: 12 / 336
- Provincial Assembly of Balochistan: 14 / 65
- Provincial Assembly of Khyber Pakhtunkhwa: 19 / 145
- Gilgit-Baltistan Legislative Assembly: 1 / 33
- Provincial Assembly of the Punjab: 0 / 371
- Provincial Assembly of Sindh: 0 / 168

Election symbol
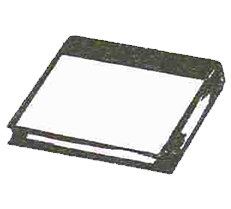
- Book Book

Party flag

Website
- www.juipak.org.pk

Jamiat Ulema-e-Islam Pakistan (JUIP), (Note: Officially registered by the Election Commission of Pakistan as 'Jamiat Ulema-e-Islam Pakistan') commonly known as Jamiat Ulema-e-Islam – Fazal (JUI–F), (Note: Urdu: جمیعت علماءِ اسلام – فضل الرحمان); lit. 'Assembly of Islamic Clerics (Fazl)';) is an Islamic fundamentalist and Islamist political party in Pakistan. Established as the Jamiat Ulema-e-Islam in 1945, it is the result of a factional split in 1988 with 'F' standing for the name of its leader, Fazal-ur-Rehman.

It has been called "the biggest religio-political party" in Pakistan, with the largest "proven street power", among all the political and religious parties of Pakistan. At the time of its inception it was based in southern Khyber Pakhtunkhwa which are mostly inhabited by Pashtuns, but over the years it has cemented its electoral base into Balochistan, Sindh and Punjab. The JUI–F is the largest splinter group of the original JUI, which split into two factions in 1980 over the policy of Pakistani president Zia-ul-Haq of supporting Mujahideen outfits in the Afghanistan war. The other faction, the much smaller JUI–S, led by Samiul Haq, is of regional significance in Khyber Pakhtunkhwa. Two other small splinter groups are the Jamiat Ulama-e-Islam Nazryati (JUI–N) which split off in 2007, but merged back into JUI–F in 2016; and Rabita Jamiat Ulema-e-Islam, led by Muhammad Khan Sherani which broke off in 2020.

The party is registered with the Election Commission of Pakistan as simply "Jamiat Ulema-e-Islam", but is still commonly referred "Jamiat Ulema-e-Islam – F".

== History ==
=== Formation ===
The JUI follows the Deobandi school of Sunni Islam. In Pakistan, Deobandis have a presence in Khyber Pakhtunkhwa (KP), Sindh, and Balochistanas well as Punjab. The JUI traces its roots to politically active Deobandi who formed the Jamiat Ulema-e-Hind (JUH) in 1919 in British India. The JUH was against colonialism and for a united India, opposing the formation of a separate homeland for Indian Muslims. A faction supporting the creation of Pakistan parted ways in 1945 to support the All Indian Muslim League. This faction came to be known as the Jamiat Ulema-e-Islam Pakistan (JUI).

=== United JUI ===
JUI's first president, Shabbir Ahmad Usmani, broke away from the party in 1947 to form the Markazi Jamiat Ulema-e-Islam (MJUI), which played a key position in the passage of the Objectives Resolution of 1949 that laid down the "Islamic" foundations of future constitutions in Pakistan. The JUI became more politically active under Maulana Mufti Mahmood (1919–1980), who assumed its leadership in 1962. Under Mufti Mahmood during the 1960s the party "developed a strong presence" and base of support among the "intensely conservative countryside" of Balochistan and Khyber Pakhtunkhwa. Mahmood led the JUI against Ayub Khan's modernisation policies.

The JUI also participated in the 1970 elections with the Jamaat-e-Islami Pakistan and the Jamiat Ulema-e-Pakistan (JUP). It won seven seats in the National Assembly and nine in the provincial assemblies and became a partner in the NWFP and Balochistan provincial governments. Mufti Mahmood was sworn in as NWFP chief minister. Under him, the provincial government established a board to bring all laws in conformity with Islam. He resigned in 1973 over Bhutto's dismissal of the Balochistan provincial government.

=== Split into JUI–F and JUI–S ===
During the 1980s, the JUI supported some of General Zia ul Haq's policies, including his anti-Soviet Jihad in Afghanistan. Additionally, official patronage and financial support for madrassas during the Zia years allowed the JUI to build thousands of madrassas, especially in the NWFP (now KPK), which were instrumental in the formation of the Taliban. At the same time the JUI was distrustful of Zia's close ties with the Jamaat-e-Islami and joined the anti-Zia and PPP-led Movement for the Restoration of Democracy (MRD).

Following the death of Mufti Mehmood Ahmed in 1980s, This dual relationship with Zia's regime eventually led to a split in the party which came to be divided into the JUI–F, headed by Maulana Fazal-ur-Rehman and the JUI-S headed by Samiul Haq, who supported Zia and was a member in his parliament, the Majlis-e-Shura.

=== JUI–F renamed to JUI ===
However, after the assassination of JUI-S chief Samiul Haq in 2018, the activities of his faction continued but gradually died down. This led Fazal-ur-Rehman to successfully plead before Election Commission of Pakistan (ECP) to get his JUI–F faction renamed as JUI in March 2019.

=== Madrassas ===
Over the years the JUI-S has maintained that it is more committed to enforcing Sharia in the country than the JUI–F faction. JUI-S influence is largely restricted to a few districts of Khyber Pakhtunkhwa (KPK), whereas the JUI–F is predominant in the Pashtun areas of Balochistan and KPK.

Both factions of the JUI have a large network of madrassas and mosques that provide the main basis for its religious activism and politics. The two JUIs run over 65 percent of all madrassas in Pakistan. About 30,000 Afghan students from JUI-controlled madrassas (both JUI–F and JUI–S) in Pakistan joined the Taliban movement in Afghanistan.

JUI party workers and leaders are mostly products of the madrassa system, although the JUI–F has often fielded candidates from a mainstream educational background. Both JUI factions have backed other India focused Deobandi militant groups, particularly the Harkat-ul-Mujahideen and its offshoot, the Jaish-e-Mohammad, with JUI madrassas providing recruits for them. They are closely associated with the Taliban in Afghanistan. The Taliban movement was reportedly started by graduates of JUI seminaries. Samiul Haq (of the JUI-S) is the leader of the Darul Uloom Haqqania madrassa in Akora Khattak, from where many of the top leaders of Taliban commanders and leaders graduated. In contrast to Maulana Samiul Haq and his JUI-S openly supporting militarism, the JUI–F has a policy of not supporting militant activity and of promoting multi-party electoral politics.

=== Peace deals ===
The JUI–F has also played a role in brokering peace deals between the military and militants in Pakistan's tribal belt. For instance, in 2004, two JUI–F national parliamentarians from South Waziristan arranged a deal (known as the Shakai agreement) with the Pakistani Taliban leadership and in September 2006 the JUI–F helped broker a similar deal in North Waziristan. These deals have been criticised for legitimising "the status of the local militants as power-brokers". JUI–F leader Fazlur Rahman is also reportedly involved in negotiating agreements between the Pakistani Taliban and military and the Afghan Taliban and the US. On the political front, the JUI–F has been more successful than the JUI-S. Fazlur Rahman, leader of the JUI–F, was appointed as chairman of the parliamentary committee on foreign affairs in the second government of Prime Minister Benazir Bhutto (1993–96).

=== History since 2002 ===
The JUI–F was also the largest party in the MMA, winning 41 seats in the National Assembly and 29 of the MMA's 48 seats in NWFP in the 2002 elections. Subsequently, Fazlur Rahman became the Leader of the Opposition in 2004 and retained the post till 2007. The JUI–F was also part of the current ruling PPP coalition but left the government amidst charges of corruption against one of its members, and information technology minister of the federal cabinet. In return for JUI–F support, the PPP-led government-appointed Maulana Sherani, a JUI–F senator without any formal academic training in Islamic jurisprudence, as chairman of the Council of Islamic Ideology in 2010. Sherani has frequently spoken out against the government's legislative efforts, particularly those related to women. He opposed a proposed bill on domestic violence stating that domestic violence was not a major issue in Pakistan until women's rights groups appeared and "created" it and that any such legislation hinders the creation of a "true Islamic society". Even though the JUI–F no longer remained a coalition partner of PPP, Fazlur Rahman chaired the Kashmir committee during the PPP government and even held the position till the end of PML-N's government in 2018.

Both factions of the JUI have frequently come together on a common platform to oppose American drone strikes in Pakistan's tribal areas, viewing it as a violation of Pakistan's sovereignty. For example, following the 2 May 2011 U.S. raid in Abbottabad that led to Osama bin Laden's killing, the JUI–F, and the JUI–S participated in a multi-party conference in Peshawar, condemning the drone strikes and calling on the government to end logistical support to NATO troops in Afghanistan.

On the domestic front, members of the JUI–F have been vocal critics of changes in the blasphemy laws. Fazlur Rahman and JUI–F has also opposed the passage of a bill aimed at preventing domestic violence with its members vowing to fight it "tooth and nail" as, according to them, its passage would "promote Western culture in the Islamic state."

In 2008, a further (minor) split of JUI–F resulted in the formation of a third faction, known as JUI-N ("N" for Nazryati "Ideological").

=== 2020 Karak temple attack ===
In 2020, a mob of local Muslims led by a local Islamic cleric and supporters of the Jamiat Ulema-e-Islam – F party attacked the historic Hindu temple in the Karak district of Khyber Pakhtunkhwa. Twelve people were arrested in the aftermath. More FIRs were registered against over 350 people. Following this attack the "Protection of the Rights of Religious Minorities Bill" was introduced in the Senate of Pakistan to avoid similar attack on minority worship places. But the Senate Standing Committee headed by Jamiat Ulema-e-Islam – F (JUI–F) senator Abdul Ghafoor Haideri turned down the bill saying existing laws were enough to protect minorities.

== Electoral history ==
=== National Assembly elections ===
Election	Party President	Votes	%	Seats	+/–
1985	Fazal-ur-Rehman	Non-participant			
1988	Fazal-ur-Rehman	360,526	1.80%	7 / 366	▲7
1990	Fazal-ur-Rehman	622,214	2.87%	6 / 366	▼1
1993	Fazal-ur-Rehman	480,099	2.34%	4 / 366	▼2
1997	Fazal-ur-Rehman	325,910	1.67%	2 / 366	▼2
2002	Fazal-ur-Rehman			59 / 366	▲57
2008	Fazal-ur-Rehman			7 / 366	▼
2013	Fazal-ur-Rehman	1,451,371	3.22%	15 / 366	▲9
2018	Fazal-ur-Rehman			14 / 366	▼1
2024	Fazal-ur-Rehman	2,163,160	4.1%	11 / 336	▼3

== See also ==
- List of Islamic political parties
- List of Deobandi organisations

== Publications ==
- Islamic Parties in Pakistan. International Crisis Group. 12 December 2011.
