= Sheikh al-Hadith =

Honorific title for scholars of the Hadiths

A Sheikh al-Hadith (Arabic: شيخ الحديث, lit. 'Scholar of hadith') is an Arabic language term that refers to a highly respected and knowledgeable scholar who specializes in the study and teaching of hadith—the sayings and actions of the Islamic prophet Muhammad. In Islamic tradition, the study and understanding of the hadith are essential for understanding the teachings of Islam and its practices.

A Sheikh al-Hadith is typically someone who has dedicated many years of their life to the study of Islamic texts, including the Quran, hadith, and other related texts. They have an in-depth knowledge of the various sciences related to hadith, such as the classification of hadith, the biographies of narrators, and the methodology of verifying the authenticity of hadith.

In many Islamic countries, Sheikh al-Hadith is a title given to respected Islamic scholars who have achieved a high level of expertise in the field of hadith. These scholars often teach at Islamic seminaries and universities, and their knowledge is sought after by students, scholars, and the wider community.

In the South Asian Islamic scholarly tradition, particularly in the Indian subcontinent, the title Sheikh al-Hadith is commonly used in a specific institutional sense to refer to a scholar who teaches Sahih al-Bukhari at an Islamic seminary.

== Notable ==
There have been many notable Sheikh al-Hadiths throughout Islamic history. Some are:

- Imam Bukhari (810-870 CE) - Imam Bukhari is considered one of the greatest scholars of hadith in Islamic history. He is best known for his collection of hadith known as Sahih al-Bukhari, which is considered one of the most authentic collections of hadith.
- Imam Muslim (821-875 CE) - Imam Muslim is another renowned scholar of hadith who is known for his collection of hadith known as Sahih Muslim. His work is also considered one of the most authentic collections of hadith.
- Imam Abu Dawud (817-889 CE) - Imam Abu Dawud is best known for his collection of hadith known as Sunan Abu Dawud. His work is considered one of the six most authentic collections of hadith.
- Imam Tirmidhi (824-892 CE) - Imam Tirmidhi is known for his collection of hadith known as Jami' at-Tirmidhi. His work is considered one of the most comprehensive collections of hadith, and it is often used as a reference in Islamic legal rulings.
- Imam Ahmad ibn Hanbal (780-855 CE) - Imam Ahmad ibn Hanbal is known for his vast knowledge of hadith, and he is considered one of the most prominent scholars of hadith in Islamic history. His collection of hadith is known as Musnad Ahmad ibn Hanbal.
- Abdur-Rahman Mubarakpuri (1865–1935 CE) - Abdur-Rahman Mubarakpuri was a prominent scholar of hadith in the Indian subcontinent. He is known for his commentary on Sahih al-Bukhari, known as Tuhfat al-Ahwazi.
- Zakariyya Kandhlawi
