= University of Peshawar =

University in Khyber Pakhtunkhwa, Pakistan

Coordinates: 34.0083°N 71.4877°E

- Other names: UoP, UPesh
- Motto: رَبِّ زدْنيِ عِلْماً
- Motto in English: O' God, Increase my Knowledge
- Type: Public
- Established: 1950; 76 years ago
- Accreditation: Higher Education Commission of Pakistan
- Chancellor: Chief Minister of Khyber Pakhtunkhwa
- Vice-Chancellor: Muhammad Jahanzeb Khan
- Academic staff: 2,693
- Students: ~14,060
- Postgraduates: 578
- Location: Peshawar, Khyber Pakhtunkhwa, Pakistan
- Campus: Urban
- Colours: Blue & white
- Website: www.uop.edu.pk
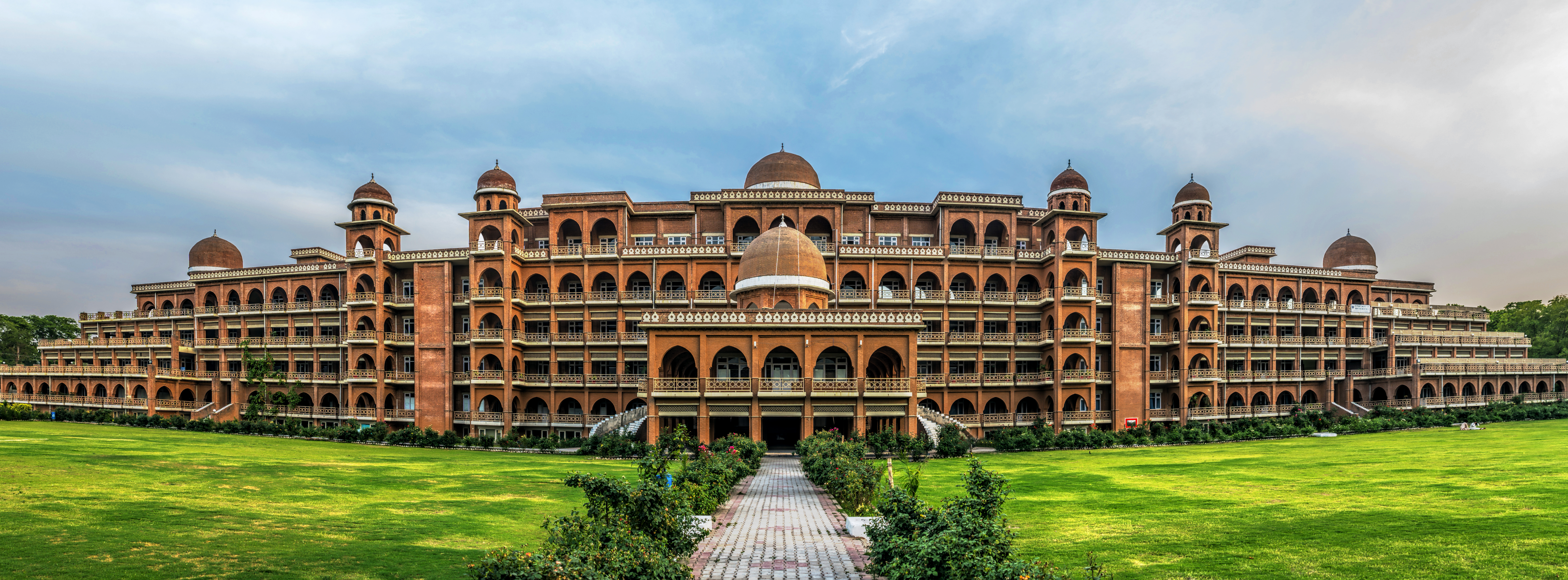

The University of Peshawar (Pashto: د پېښور پوهنتون; Hindko: پشور یونیورسٹی; Urdu: جامعۂ پشاور; abbreviated UoP; known more popularly as Peshawar University) is a public research university located in Peshawar, Khyber Pakhtunkhwa, Pakistan.

The university is one of the oldest universities in the province, and is ranked as one of the highest rated universities in the country.

== History ==
The university was founded in 1950 and offers programs for undergraduate, post-graduate, and doctoral studies. With approximately 14,000 enrolled students attending the university, it has six academic faculties with forty postgraduate department as well as two "centers of excellence". The university is known for its research in social, medical, and natural sciences having eight research centers located inside the campus. Spread over an area of 1,045 acres (4 km^{2}) as a residential campus, the university is the first public university to be established in Khyber Pakhtunkhwa.

In its inaugural year, it had an enrollment of 129, of whom one was a woman. The university was founded as an expansion of the Islamia College. The founder of Pakistan, Muhammad Ali Jinnah, who had visited the college in 1928 had great admiration for it, referring to it as 'my college' and adopted it as one of the three heirs to his fortune, along with Aligarh University and Sindh Madrassa (his own school) in 1939. For Jinnah the university was a gift to students of the province, in recognition of the part played by them in the making of Pakistan, and how it was the Pashtuns who had fought the Indians and captured Azad Kashmir.

== Recognized university ==
University of Peshawar is a recognized university by the Higher Education Commission of Pakistan. This university awards both undergraduate and postgraduate degrees.

== Departments ==
University of Peshawar has many departments including:

- Arts & Humanities
- Business & Social Sciences
- Language & Cultural
- Medicine & Health
- Science & Technology.

University rankings

Global – Overall
- QS World: 901-950 (2026)

Regional – Overall
- QS Asia: 197 (2022)

=== Department of Pharmacy ===
The department was established in 1982, housed at the Centre of Excellence in Physical Chemistry. After a period of two years, it was shifted to the newly constructed building of the present location. The department has been recognized by the Pharmacy Council of Pakistan. Research groups conduct research in the field of Pharmacology, Pharmaceutics, Pharmaceutical analysis and Pharmacognosy.

An animal house with bioassay laboratory meets the research and academic needs of the university. Research in the Pharmacology section of the department is focused on testing compounds from both synthetic and natural origin for their utility in pain, inflammation, pyrexia, depression, anxiety, dependence, tolerance and vomiting as well as toxicological testing.

=== National Center of Excellence in Geology ===
The National Center of Excellence in Geology (NCEG), University of Peshawar (UoP), is an institution of higher learning and research in Geo-sciences. It was established in 1974 under an act of the parliament. Dr. R.A. Khan Tahirkheli was the founder Director of the center. Upon his retirement, Dr. M. Qasim Jan succeeded him in 1988 who was succeeded by Prof. Dr. Syed Hamidullah in January 2001, Dr. M. Asif Khan in 2002 and again by Dr. Syed Hamidullah in 2003. After the death of S. Hamidullah in an air crash, Dr. M. Asif Khan is the director of the center.

=== Shaykh Zayed Islamic Centre ===
The Shaykh Zayed Islamic Center, University of Peshawar is one of the three educational Centers financed by his Excellency Shayh Zayed Ibne Sultan Al-Nahyan, Emir of the United Arab Emirates (UAE). The other two Centers are located at Karachi and Lahore on the Campuses of the respective universities. The entire cost of the project was borne by the Government of U.A.E while the land was donated by the University of Peshawar. The Emir of U.A.E has established a trust for the developmental expenditures of the center, while recurring cost is borne by the Federal Government of Pakistan.
