= Akora Khattak =

Town in Khyber-Pakhtunkhwa, Pakistan

Akora Khattak اکوړه خټک
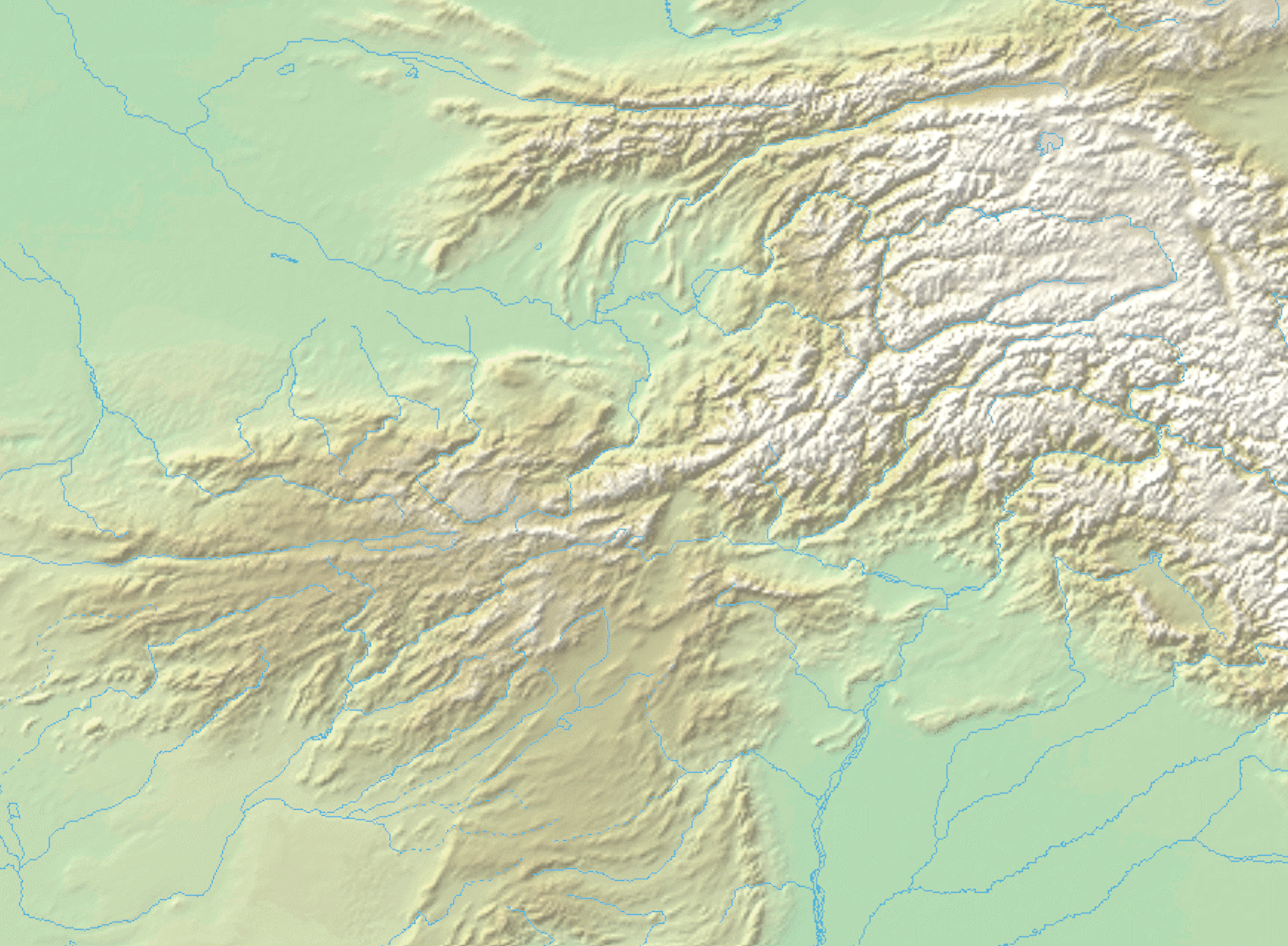
- Location within Pakistan Location within Hindu-Kush Location within West and Central Asia
- Country: Pakistan
- Province: Khyber-Pakhtunkhwa
- District: Nowshera District

Population (2023)
  - Total: 29,750
- Time zone: UTC+5 (PST)

Akora Khattak (Pashto: اکوړه خټک pronounce, Urdu: اکوڑہ خٹک pronounce) or Sarai Akora is a town in the Jehangira Tehsil of the Nowshera District in the Khyber Pakhtunkhwa province of Pakistan. Its location is adjacent to the Kabul River, which converges with the Indus River about 15 kilometres downstream. Neighbouring places are Nowshera Cantonment to the west and Nowshera to the east.

== Geography ==
Akora Khattak is about 14 km (9 miles) east of the Nowshera city in the Nowshera District on Grand Trunk Road.

== History ==
Akora Khattak was formerly called Sarai Akora. It is named after Malik Akor Khan Khattak, who was the great-grandfather of the famous Pashtun warrior and poet, Khushal Khan Khattak.

In December 1826, The battle of Akora Khattak was fought between the Sikh Empire and Mujahideen, mainly Pashtuns, under Syed Ahmad Barelvi. The 1500 Mujahideen defeated 4,000 strong Sikh army, killing between 500 and 700 Sikh soldiers.

The British period started from 29 August 1849. The cantonment of Akora Khattak was established in 1850. In 1916, the first police station was established.

== Demographics ==
=== Population ===
Historical population
Year	Pop.	±% p.a.
1951	...	—
1961	7,954	—
1972	11,191	+3.15%
1981	13,788	+2.35%
1998	19,530	+2.07%
2017	33,013	+2.80%
2023	29,750	−1.72%

As of the 2023 census, Akora Khattak had a population of 29,750. The population of Akora Khattak, according to the 2017 census, was 33,013.

== Notable places ==
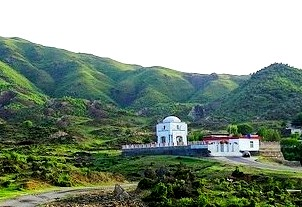
Tomb of Khushal Khan Khattak

=== Tomb of Khushal Khan Khattak ===
Akora Khattak is the birthplace and burial place of the poet great Pashto poet and warrior Khushal Khan Khattak. The mausoleum of Khushal Khan was built in 1949.

=== Dar-ul-Uloom Haqqania ===
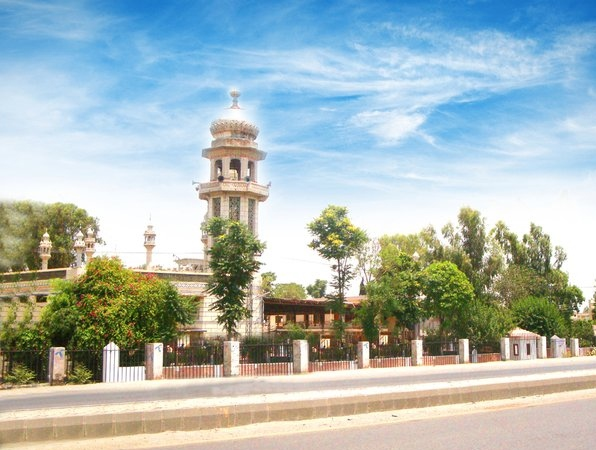
Dar-Ul-Uloom Haqqania

Darul Uloom Haqqania was founded in 1947 by Abdul Haq Akorwi, who was the father of Sami ul Haq. It is the second largest Islamic religious seminary in Pakistan.

=== Khushal Khan Khattak memorial library ===
Khushal Khan Khattak Memorial Library is a public library in Akora Khattak. The Library was established in 1994 in the memory of Khushal Khan Khattak. The museum has many medieval era artefacts, some of which were used by Khushal Khan Khattak.

== Education ==
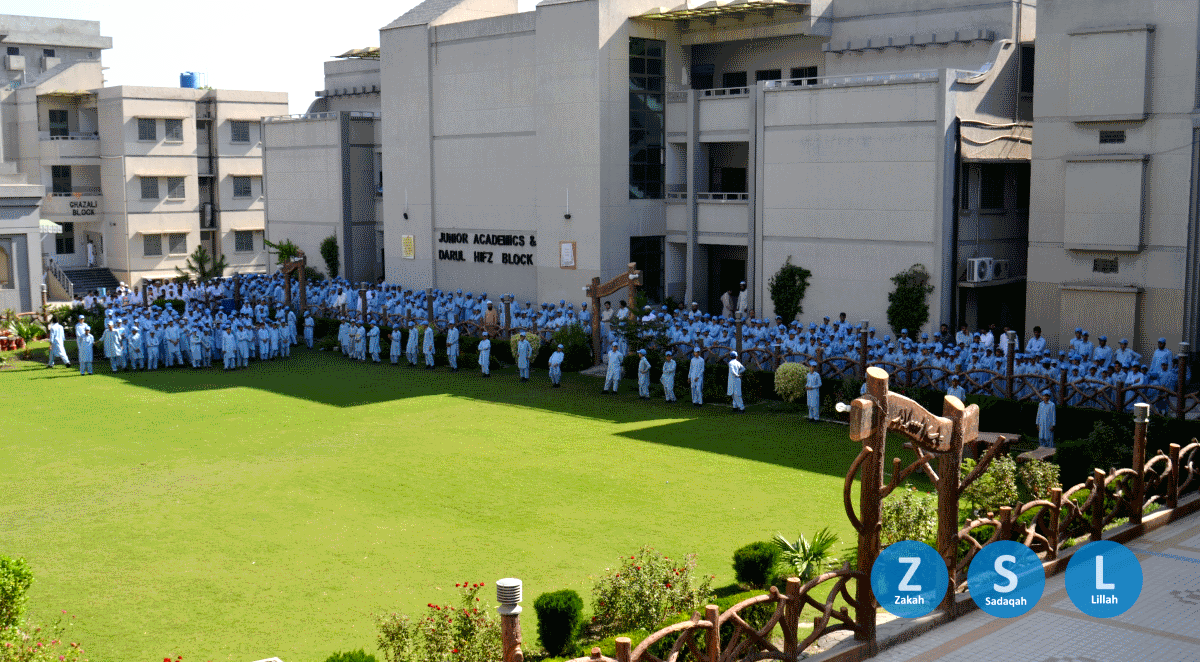
Umma Children Academy

Schools and colleges

- Govt Centennial Model high school (boys)
- Khyber Model College and School Akora Khattak Campus
- The student model high school and College
- Govt high school (boys) Baghbanpura
- Govt Girls Middle School Baghbanpura
- Sir Syed public High school
- Govt high school (girls)
- Haqqania High School
- Tamir-e-millat high school
- Public collegiate high school
- Bright Start English school
- Jamia Shams Ul Madaris Surya Khel for (boys and girls)
- Rahman public school
- Army Public school Akora Khattak
- The Sun Rise public school
- Govt Khushal Khan Khattak degree college (boys)
- Govt Khushal Khan Khattak college (girls)
- The Safah public school
- The Quaid Public School
- The Suffa Public School
- The Sarhad Public School Akora Khattak
- AIMS (Alqalam Islamic Model School)
- Ummah Higher Secondary School Soria Khel Akora Khattak

Academies

- Umma Children Academy
- National Children Academy
- Scientific Learning tuition Academy Akora Khattak
- The Aryana English Language & Computer Academy
- Jamal Ul Quran Online Academy

Institutes

- Shahcom Institute of Technology (Regd.)
- National Institute of Technology

== Health care ==
- LRBT Free Eye Hospital

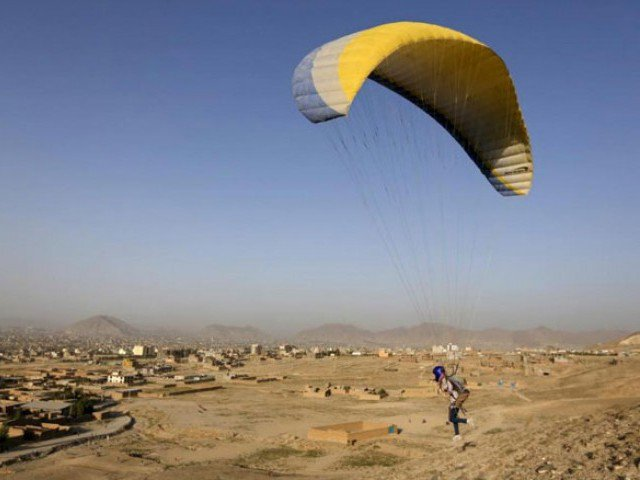
Paragliding in Akora Khattak

== Notable people from Akora Khattak ==
- Khushal Khan Khattak – warrior poet, chief, and freedom fighter
- Abdul Haq Akorwi – Islamic scholar and founder of the Islamic seminary Darul Uloom Haqqania
- Sami-ul-Haq - Regarded as the "Father of the Taliban"
- Ajmal Khattak – politician and writer

== See also ==
- Qazi Hussain Ahmad
- Syed Ahmad Barelvi
- Kakazai
