= Abdullah Hasani Nadwi =

Indian Islamic scholar and da'i (1957–2013)

Dā'i-e-Islam, Mawlana Abdullah Hasani Nadwi

General Secretary of All India Payam-e-Insaniyat Forum
- In office 2006 – 30 January 2013
- Succeeded by: Bilal Abdul Hai Hasani Nadwi

Personal life
- Born: 29 January 1957 Aminabad, Lucknow, Uttar Pradesh, India
- Died: 30 January 2013 (aged 56) Qaisar Bagh, Lucknow, India
- Parent: Mohammad al-Hasani (father)
- Education: Darul Uloom Nadwatul Ulama
- Occupation: Islamic scholar, Da'i, Sufi shaykh
- Relatives: Abdul Hai Hasani (his great-grandfather); Abul Hasan Ali Hasani Nadwi (his grandfather's brother); Rabey Hasani Nadwi (his father's cousin and his father in law); Wazeh Hasani Nadwi (his father's cousin); Bilal Abdul Hai Hasani Nadwi (younger brother)

Religious life
- Religion: Islam
- Denomination: Sunni Islam
- Jurisprudence: Hanafi
- Tariqa: Chishtiyya-Qadiriyya-Suhrawardiyya-Naqshbandiyya-Muhammadiyya Ahmadiyya
- Creed: Maturidi

Muslim leader
- Teacher: Abul Hasan Ali Hasani Nadwi; Rabey Hasani Nadwi; Wazeh Rashid Hasani Nadwi; Saeed-ur-Rahman Azmi Nadvi; Abd al-Fattah Abu Ghudda; Yusuf al-Qaradawi
- Disciple of: Abul Hasan Ali Hasani Nadwi
- Influenced by: Zakariyya Kandhlawi, Abul Hasan Ali Hasani Nadwi

Abdullah Hasani Nadwi (29 January 1957 – 30 January 2013) was an Indian Islamic scholar, professor of Hadith, Sufi shaykh, da'i, and author. He worked as a lecturer at Darul Uloom Nadwatul Ulama in Lucknow for 36 years. He also served as General Secretary of the All India Payam-e-Insaniyat Forum from 2006 to 2013.

== Early life and education ==
Abdullah Hasani Nadwi was born on 29 January 1957, in Aminabad, Lucknow, in Uttar Pradesh, India. His tahnik was conducted by Hussain Ahmad Madani. His father, Mohammad al-Hasani, was an Islamic scholar and the founder and editor-in-chief of the Arabic magazine Al-Baas El-Islami. His grandfather, Syed Abdul Ali Hasani, was the 6th chancellor of Darul Uloom Nadwatul Ulama and the elder brother of Abul Hasan Ali Nadwi. His great-grandfather, Abdul Hai Hasani, was the author of the notable biographical book Nuzhat al-Khawātir. His lineage reaches Hasan Al Musanna bin Hasan ibn Ali through Syed Ahmad Barelvi.

He received his primary education in his home and neighborhood, which he started in 1961. For his further education, he enrolled in Mahad Darul Uloom Nadwatul Ulama in 1966 and completed the Aalimiyyah course in 1975 AD (1395 AH) and the Fazīlah course in 1977 AD (1397 AH) at Darul Uloom Nadwatul Ulama.

His teachers included Muhammad Rabey Hasani, Abdus Sattar Azmi, Ziyaul Hasan Azmi, Burhanuddin Sambhali, Nāsir Ali Nadwi, Wajihuddin Nadwi, Saeed-ur-Rahman Azmi, Wazeh Rashid Hasani, Abul Irfan Khan Jaunpuri, Muhammad Uwais Nagrami, and Muhammad Zuhūr Nadwi.

He learned Tajwid and Qira'at in the Hafs 'an Asim tradition from Muhammad Waseem Khan at Madrasa Aaliya Furqania in Lucknow.

He also received permission (Ijazah) in Hadith from Muhammad Ahmad Partapgarhi, Abul Hasan Ali Hasani Nadwi, Manzoor Nomani, Abd al-Fattah Abu Ghudda, Yusuf al-Qaradawi, Nūr al-Dīn ʿItr, and Yunus Jaunpuri.

He first pledged allegiance to Zakariyya Kandhlawi in Sufism, but he received all instructions from Tazkiyah and Ihsan from Abul Hasan Ali Hasani Nadwi and became his authorized disciple in the Sufi orders of Chishtiyya, Qadiriyya, Suhrawardiyya, and Naqshbandiyya in 1999.

== Career ==
In January 1977, Nadwi was appointed a teacher at Darul Uloom Nadwatul Ulama, remaining there until his demise in 2013. He taught books like Mishkat al-Masabih, Sahih al-Bukhari, and Shah Waliullah Dehlawi's Hujjatullah al-Balighah from elementary to advanced levels.

In the second half of 1979, he was appointed as Editing Secretary (Arabic: سكرتير التحرير) of Fortnightly Al-Raid, and later he became its managing editor (Arabic: مدير التحرير), remaining until his demise.

The most important aspect of his life was Da'wah in light of the principles of the Qur'an. He was associated with the All India Payam-e-Insaniyat Forum established by Abul Hasan Ali Hasani Nadwi during his lifetime, became more active after his demise, was elected its General Secretary in 2006, and held this position until his death. He also visited several Indian states and other international places to spread the message of Islam across the world. Many non-Muslims were inspired by the truth of Islam and accepted Islam at his hands.

Noor Alam Khalil Amini wrote that he not only kept this movement of Abul Hasan Ali Hasani Nadwi alive; on the contrary, he performed admirable feats from this platform. He not only connected many non-Muslim literati to the movement; rather, it brought them closer to Islam and Islamic culture and paved the way for many of them to become familiar with Islamic teachings, thus removing the Islamophobia from a class of Hindus.

Apart from these, he was the founding member of Jamiat-u-Shabab-il-Islam, Lucknow, the founder of Al-Aafia Centre Lucknow, as well as the patron of several madrasas, schools, and associations.

== Literary works ==
Nadwi pushed his students and followers to publish Islamic literature and booklets in multiple languages in order to spread the Islamic message over the world. This section includes the English translation of the book Islam Ka Ta'āruf (transl. The Islam's introduction) by Abul Hasan Ali Hasani Nadwi, the Hindi and English translation of Islam Ki Ta'leem (transl. The teaching of Islam), the Hindi translation of Quran-e-Majeed Insāni Zindagi Ka Rahbar-e-Kāmil (transl. Quran the perfect guide of human life), the Hindi translation of Sulaiman Nadvi's Khutbat-e-Madras, and the Hindi translations of several books by Abdul Hai Hasani, Abdul Ali Hasani, and Abul Hasan Ali Hasani.

His articles appeared in the monthly journals Al-Raid, Al-Baas Al-Islami, Rizwan, Bang-e-Dara, Bang-e-Hira, Hira Ka Paigham, and Nuqoosh-e-Islam, with the majority of his Arabic articles archived in Al-Raid.

=== Books ===
Nadwi's sermons, speeches, and articles have been compiled as books, including:

- Haqīqat-e-Tauhīd (the reality of Tawhid)
- Muhabbat-e-Ahl-e-Bayt (Love the Ahl al-Bayt)
- Muhabbat-e-Sahāba (Love the Companions of the Prophet)
- Naik Suhbat Ki Zarūrat (The need for good company)
- Aadāb-e-Mu'āsharat: Quran o Sunnat Ki Roshni Mein (The Etiquette of Lifestyle in the Light of Quran and Sunnah)
- Mithāli Akhlāq: Quran o Sunnat Ki Roshni Mein (Ideal manners in the light of Quran and Sunnah)
- Islāmi Ibādāt: Quran o Sunnat Ki Roshni Mein (Islamic worship in the light of Quran and Sunnah)
- Bātini Sifāt: Quran o Sunnat Ki Roshni Mein (Mystical Qualities in the Light of Qur’an and Sunnah)
- Ikhlaas: Uske Barakāt o Samarāt (Sincerity: its blessings and benefits)
- Azwa’un 'ala as-Seerat an-Nabawiyyah (Lights on the Prophet's Biography)
- Tazkira Hazrat Maulana Ahmad Partabgarhi (a biographical memoir of Maulana Ahmad Partabgarhi)
- Tazkira Mufakkir-e-Islam (a biographical memoir of Maulana Abul Hasan Ali Hasani Nadwi)
- Haqīqi Muhabbat Aur Uske Taqāze (true love and its demands)
- Khutbaat e Da'wat o Islāh (a collection of his sermons in five volumes)
- Kārwān-e-Insāniyat (The caravan of humanity)

== Death ==
Nadwi died on 30 January 2013 (Rabi' al-Awwal 17, 1434 AH) in Lucknow at the age of 55. His funeral prayer was first offered by Saeed-ur-Rahman Azmi Nadvi at Darul Uloom Nadwatul Ulama, Lucknow, after Maghrib prayer. Then his body was taken to Takia Kalan, Raebareli, where the second funeral prayer was offered by Muhammad Rabey Hasani Nadwi, and he was buried in his native graveyard.
