= Abdul Aleem Farooqui =

Indian Islamic scholar (1948–2024)

Maulana Abdul Aleem Farooqui

Vice-President of Jamiat Ulama-e-Hind (A)
- In office 15 October 2020 – 24 April 2024

1st General Secretary of Jamiat Ulama-e-Hind (A)
- In office 8 April 2008 – 15 October 2020
- Preceded by: office established
- Succeeded by: Masoom Saqib Qasmi

10th General Secretary of Jamiat Ulama-e-Hind
- In office 23 January 1995 – 23 December 2001
- Preceded by: Mufti Abdul Razzaq
- Succeeded by: Mahmood Madani

Personal life
- Born: 1948 Lucknow, United Provinces, India
- Died: 24 April 2024 (aged 76) Lucknow, Uttar Pradesh, India
- Education: Mazahir Uloom Saharanpur; Darul Uloom Deoband
- Occupation: Islamic scholar, Sufi shaykh

Religious life
- Religion: Islam
- Denomination: Sunni Islam
- Jurisprudence: Hanafi
- Tariqa: Chishtiya-Sabiriya-Imdadiya
- Creed: Maturidi
- Movement: Deobandi

Muslim leader
- Teacher: Syed Fakhruddin Ahmad; Yunus Jaunpuri
- Disciple of: Talha Kandhlawi

Abdul Aleem Farooqui (1948 – 24 April 2024) was an Indian Islamic scholar who served as the general secretary of the United Jamiat Ulama-e-Hind for seven years and as the general secretary of Jamiat Ulema-e-Hind (A) for 13 years. Lastly, he served as the Vice President of Jamiat Ulema-e-Hind (A).

== Early life and education ==
Abdul Aleem Farooqui was born on 15 August 1948 (10 Shawwal 1367 AH). He was the grandson of Abdush Shakoor Farooqi Lakhnavi and the elder son of Abdus Salam Farooqi Lakhnavi.

Farooqui received his primary education in Lucknow and his Arabic studies at Jamia Hussainia Muhammadi, Lakhimpur. Then he enrolled at Mazahir Uloom Saharanpur and spent there for three years between 1966 AD (1386 AH) and 1968 AD (1388), where he received instructions on courses from Sharh Jami (Al-Fawaed-Uz-Ziya'iya) up to Mishkat al-Masabih.

At Mazahir Uloom, his teachers included Yunus Jaunpuri. At that time, he was an attendant of Asadullah Rampuri, the rector of Mazahir Uloom, and benefited from him intellectually and spiritually. Later, he pledged allegiance to Talha Kandhlawi, the son and successor of Zakariyya Kandhlawi, and was authorised by him in the Sufi Chisti order.

After Mazahir Uloom, he came to Darul Uloom Deoband and graduated from there in 1969 (1389 AH). He studied Sahih al-Bukhari with Syed Fakhruddin Ahmad.

== Career ==
Farooqui served as the rector of Darul Muballigheen Lucknow, which he also used as a platform for serving several religious purposes, including preaching, publishing, and defending Sunni Islam. He was the President of Lucknow's Majlis-e-Tahaffuz-e-Namoos-e-Sahaba. From 1998 onwards, he organized the yearly march of Juloos-e-Madh-e-Sahaba in Lucknow, which has been attended by thousands of Muslims.

Farooqui was one of the well-known leaders of Jamiat Ulema-e-Hind. From 23 January 1995, to 23 December 2001, he was the General Secretary of United Jamiat Ulema-e-Hind. After the split of Jamiat-e-Ulema, from 8 April 2008, to 15 October 2020, he served as the General Secretary of Jamiat Ulema Hind (A). Lastly, he served as the vice president of Jamiat Ulama-e-Hind (A).

Farooqui was a member of the advisory committee of Darul Uloom Deoband from 1998 (1419 AH). Apart from this, he was a member of Nadwatul Ulama, Chairman of the Deeni Taleemi Trust, Lucknow, and Ameer-e-Sharī'at of Uttar Pradesh.

In 2016, Shias in Lucknow protested Saudi Arabia's execution of Sheikh Nimr al-Nimr. Farooqui compared it to Ajmal Kasab's hanging in India. Shia Muslim cleric Kalbe Jawad accused Farooqui of labeling a rights activist as a terrorist. Farooqui denied this, stating that protesting against Saudi Arabia in India interferes with another country's security. Also, Farooqui remarked that "they (Saudi Arabia) hanged him (Nimr) as per the law of their land, but they (Shias) are protesting here. It would be the same if protests were organized in other countries against Ajmal Kasab's hanging."

In March 2020, Farooqui stated that we need an India in which Muslims and Hindus protect each other's religious sites and refrain from bias based on caste or name. Performance should not be judged based on caste; everyone deserves equal rights.

== Death ==
Farooqui died in Lucknow on 24 April 2024, at the age of 76. His funeral prayer was led by his son Abdul Bari Farooqui at Darul Uloom Nadwatul Ulama, which was attended by Abul Qasim Nomani, Sajjad Nomani, Bilal Abdul Hai Hasani, and thousands of others. He was buried in Lucknow's Aishbagh Cemetery. Arshad Madani expressed grief over his death and said that it would be difficult to fill the void that the scholar's death has caused in academic and social circles.

== Literary works ==
One of Farooqui's articles on Mirza Ghulam Ahmad was published under the title Aqeeda-e-Khatme Nubuwwat Aur Mirza Ghulam Ahmad Qadiani (transl. The Belief of the End of Prophethood and Mirza Ghulam Ahmad Qadiani). His books included:

- Hadhrat Sayyidina Mu'awiya Aur Muanideen Ke Aitrazāt (Urdu; transl. Ameer-e-Muawiya and the objections of the opponents)
- Madhhab-e-Shī'a Ka 'Ilmi Muhāsaba (transl. A scholarly review of the Shia Islam)
- Aayina-e-Mirza (transl. A review of Mirza Ghulam Ahmad)
- Mazhab-e-Shia ke Bunyadi 40 Aqeeday (transl. The Fundamental Forty Beliefs of the Shia Faith)

== See also ==
- List of Deobandis
