= Shafiqur Rahman Nadwi =

Indian Islamic scholar (1942–2002)

Mawlāna Shafiqur Rahman Nadwi

Personal life
- Born: 9 June 1942 Sant Pur, Nautan Block, West Champaran district, Bihar, India
- Died: 24 June 2002 (aged 60) Lucknow, India
- Resting place: Daliganj graveyard, Lucknow
- Main interest(s): Arabic literature, Urdu literature, Fiqh
- Notable work: Al-Fiqh Al-Muyassar
- Education: Darul Uloom Nadwatul Ulama

Religious life
- Religion: Islam

Senior posting
- Teacher: Abul Hasan Ali Hasani Nadwi; Manzoor Nomani; Rabey Hasani Nadwi; Saeed-ur-Rahman Azmi Nadvi

Shafiqur Rahman Nadwi (1942–2002), also written as Shafiq-ur-Rahman Nadwi, was an Indian Islamic scholar and a writer of Arabic and Urdu. He was an alumni and professor of Darul Uloom Nadwatul Ulama and the author of the famous book of Fiqh in Arabic, Al-Fiqh Al-Muyassar. He also served as the office-in-charge of the madrasas affiliated with Darul Uloom Nadwatul Ulama, which numbered 150 at the time.

== Early life and education ==
Shafiqur Rehman Nadwi was born on 9 June 1942, to Manzoor Hasan Siddiqui in Sant Pur, Nautan Block, West Champaran District, in the Indian state of Bihar.

He received his early education in madrasas near his homeland, including Madrasa Islamia of Bettiah, from where he enrolled in Darul Uloom Nadwatul Ulama, Lucknow, on 10 June 1956, and graduated from there in February 1962.

His teachers included Muḥammad Ishaq Sandelwi, Abul Hasan Ali Hasani Nadwi, Manzoor Nomani, Abdul Hafiz Balyawi, Rabey Hasani Nadwi, and Saeed-ur-Rahman Azmi Nadvi.

During his student days, in 1959, under the supervision of Rabey Hasani Nadwi, an Arabic fortnightly magazine, Al-Raid, was published by the students' Arabic club, An Nadi al Arabi of Darul Uloom Nadwatul Ulama, which was edited by him. But in October 1960, with issue 8/7 in its second year, his name appeared on the front page for the first time as editor-in-chief.

== Career ==
Shafiqur Rahman started his teaching career in April 1962 at Madrasa Islah al-Muslimeen Pathar Ki Masjid, Patna, after graduating from Nadwa. After two years, on the suggestion of Abul Irfan Khan Nadwi, the working principal of Darul Uloom Nadwatul Ulama, he was appointed as a teacher at Darul Uloom Nadwatul Ulama in February 1964. He returned to his homeland after serving one year as a teacher and spent seven to eight years as a trader and journalist. In 1972, he became rector of Rifahul Muslimeen in Rampur Kesaria, East Champaran, Bihar. In 1974, on the advice of his teacher Rabey Hasani Nadwi, he was returned to Darul Uloom Nadwatul Ulama and served there as a teacher until his death.

He also served as the office-in-charge of 150 affiliated madrasas of Darul Uloom Nadwatul Ulama; all activities in this regard were carried out based on his report and recommendations, and he also visited these affiliated madrasas.

On Abul Hasan Ali Hasani Nadwi's order, he wrote the book Al-Fiqh Al-Muyassar, which is a curriculum featured in universities throughout the country and overseas, including Darul Uloom Nadwatul Ulama and all of its branches. Apart from that, his articles have been published both in India and overseas.

His son Tariq Shafiq Nadwi, President of Urdu Department, Islamia College, Gorakhpur, has written an analytical commentary on his five-year activities in the monthly Zikr o Fikr, New Delhi, titled Matā'-e-Zikr-o-Fikr.

He was also among those scholars who considered it right to establish a TV station with the sole purpose of defending Islam and Islamic teachings and propagating the message of Islam.

== Death ==
Shafiqur Rahman died on 24 June 2002 (Rabi' al-Thani 12, 1423 AH) at dawn due to cardiac arrest. The funeral prayer was led by Saeed-ur-Rahman Azmi Nadvi in the premises of Darul Uloom Nadwatul Ulama, Lucknow and he was buried in the Daliganj graveyard. His wife and five children survived him, along with two sons, Tariq Shafiq Nadwi and Khalid Shafiq Nadwi.
