= Mohammad Waseeque Nadwi =

Indian Islamic scholar and writer

Mawlānā, Dr. Mohammad Waseeque Nadwi

Editor-in-chief of Al-Raid
- Incumbent
- Assumed office 22 January 2025
- Preceded by: Jafar Masood Hasani Nadwi

Personal life
- Born: 25 September 1982 (age 44) Sahilamau, Lucknow district, Uttar Pradesh, India
- Notable work(s): Al-Shaykh Muhammad Wazeh Rashid al-Nadwi: Hayatuhu, Afkaruhu, Ma'athiruhu; Ta'alaw Nata'allam
- Education: Darul Uloom Nadwatul Ulama (Ālimiyyah); University of Lucknow (B.A, M.A, PhD)
- Occupation: Islamic scholar, Arabic writer, translator, teacher and journalist

Mohammad Waseeque Nadwi (born 25 September 1982) is an Indian Islamic scholar, Arabic writer, translator, teacher and journalist. He has been editor-in-chief of Al-Raid since 22 January 2025 and has served as a teacher at Darul Uloom Nadwatul Ulama since 2005.

== Early life and education ==
Mohammad Waseeque Nadwi was born on 25 September 1982 in Sahilamau, in the Malihabad area of Lucknow district, Uttar Pradesh, India.

He received his early education at Mahad Sayyiduna Abu Bakr al-Siddiq in Mahipatmau, and completed his Ālimiyyah at Darul Uloom Nadwatul Ulama in 2000. He subsequently earned a bachelor's degree in 2004 and a master's degree in Arabic in 2006 from the University of Lucknow. He was among the notable students of Wazeh Rashid Hasani Nadwi.

In 2022, he was awarded a PhD by the University of Lucknow for his dissertation on Wazeh Rashid Hasani Nadwi, titled Mohammad Wazeh Rasheed Hasani Nadawi as a Writer and Thinker, under the supervision of Musheer Husain Siddiqui.

== Career ==
Nadwi began his career at Al-Raid in 2000 as a translator from Urdu and English into Arabic and subsequently worked in journalism and teaching. He became second deputy editor in 2009, assistant editor in 2013, editor in 2019, and editor-in-chief on 22 January 2025, succeeding Jafar Masood Hasani Nadwi.

In 2005, he joined the Faculty of Arabic Language and Literature at Darul Uloom Nadwatul Ulama as a teacher of Arabic and Qur'anic exegesis. He has also served in several academic and administrative roles at the institution.

He is also a member of the International Union of Muslim Scholars and the International Organisation of Supporters of The Prophet.

== Literary works ==
Nadwi has written and translated works in Arabic and Urdu and has published articles and research on literature, thought and history. His writings have appeared in Al-Raid, Al-Baas el-Islami and Urdu newspapers and periodicals. He has also compiled, arranged, edited and reviewed works by Rabey Hasani Nadwi and Wazeh Rashid Hasani Nadwi.

His works include:

- Muhsin-e-Insaniyat Ki Insaniyat Nawazi Aur Muhazzab Duniya Ka Roshan Chehra (Urdu; with an Arabic version titled Muhammad Rasul Allah Rahmatan lil-'Alamin wa al-Wajh al-Kalih lil-'Alam al-Mutahaddir)
- Alam-e-Islam Par Maghrib Ka Tasallut: Asbab-o-Nataij (Urdu; with an Arabic version titled Saitarat al-Gharb 'ala al-'Alam al-Islami: Asbab wa Nata'ij)
- Ta'alaw Nata'allam (lessons on Arabic expression and modern Arabic terminology)
- Maulana Abdul Bari Nadwi: Shakhsiyat aur Deeni o Ilmi Khidmāt (compilation and arrangement of articles on Abdul Bari Nadvi's life)
- Al-Shaykh Muhammad Wazeh Rashid al-Nadwi: Hayatuhu, Afkaruhu, Ma'athiruhu (on Wazeh Rashid Hasani Nadwi's life, thought, achievements and scholarly and literary works)
- Al-Mukhtar min Sifat al-Safwa
- Qadiyyat Filastin: al-'Alam al-Islami wa al-Gharb
- Lamasat min al-Sirah al-Nabawiyyah
- Naya Alami Nizam Aur Hum (Urdu; translation and arrangement of articles published in Al-Raid by Wazeh Rashid Hasani Nadwi)
- Islami Da'wat (Urdu; translation and arrangement of articles published in Al-Raid by Wazeh Rashid Hasani Nadwi)
- Muhsin-e-Insaniyat (Urdu translation of Wazeh Rashid Hasani Nadwi's Lamahat min al-Sirah al-Nabawiyyah wa al-Adab al-Nabawi)
- Nizam-e-Talim-o-Tarbiyat (Urdu; translation of articles by Wazeh Rashid Hasani Nadwi published in Al-Raid)
- Sirajan Muniran: Sirat Khatam al-Nabiyyin Muhammad (Arabic translation of Rabey Hasani Nadwi's Rahbar-e-Insaniyat Muhammad)
- Nazarah 'ala Dhat al-Bari Ta'ala fi Daw' al-Nazariyyat al-Jadidah (Arabic translation of Shihabuddin Nadvi's work)
- Takwir al-Shams (Arabic translation of Shihabuddin Nadvi's work)
- Nizam al-Dalail (Arabic translation of Shihabuddin Nadvi's work)
- Al-Da'iyah al-Islami al-Kabir al-Shaykh Muhammad In'am al-Hasan al-Kandhalawi wa Juhuduhu al-Da'wiyyah (Arabic translation of Muhammad Shahid Saharanpuri's work on Inamul Hasan Kandhlavi)
- Al-Shaykh Abu al-Hasan Ali al-Hasani al-Nadwi wa Malamihuhu al-Barizah (Arabic translation of Rabey Hasani Nadwi's work)
- Ta'ammulat fi Surat Yusuf (Arabic translation of Rabey Hasani Nadwi's work)
- Sha'a'ir Allah Ta'ala wa Ta'zimuhu (Arabic translation of Rabey Hasani Nadwi's work)
- Fi Zilal al-Sirah (compiled, arranged and reviewed by Nadwi; a collection of articles by Rabey Hasani Nadwi)
