= Jafar Masood Hasani Nadwi =

Indian Islamic scholar, writer and translator (1965–2025)

Mawlānā Syed Jafar Masood Hasani Nadwi

Secretary of Nadwatul Ulama
- In office 6 May 2023 – 15 January 2025
- Preceded by: Bilal Abdul Hai Hasani Nadwi
- Succeeded by: Ammar Hasani Nadwi

Editor-in-chief of the Arabic fortnightly Al-Raid
- In office 1 February 2019 – 16 January 2025
- Preceded by: Wazeh Rashid Hasani Nadwi
- Succeeded by: Mohammad Waseeque Nadwi

Personal life
- Born: 13 September 1965 Takia, Raebareli district, Uttar Pradesh, India
- Died: 15 January 2025 (aged 59) Lucknow, Uttar Pradesh, India
- Cause of death: Motor vehicle collision
- Parent: Wazeh Rashid Hasani Nadwi (father)
- Notable work(s): Fī Masīrat al-Hayāt (Arabic translation), Basāir
- Education: Darul Uloom Nadwatul Ulama; Lucknow University; King Saud University
- Occupation: Islamic scholar, writer, translator
- Relatives: Rabey Hasani Nadwi (paternal uncle and father-in-law)

Religious life
- Religion: Islam
- Denomination: Sunni Islam
- Jurisprudence: Hanafi

Jafar Masood Hasani Nadwi (13 September 1965 – 15 January 2025) was an Indian Sunni Islamic scholar, educator, writer, and translator. He was associated with Nadwatul Ulama, Lucknow, where he held the position of Secretary (Nazir-e-Aam) from 2023 until his death in 2025. Nadwi also served as the editor-in-chief of Al-Raid, an Arabic fortnightly journal, and contributed to the promotion of Islamic literature through his leadership as General Secretary and later President of the International League of Islamic Literature (Aalami Rabta-e-Adab-e-Islami). He was known for his translations and writings in Arabic and Urdu on Islamic thought, history, and literature.

== Early life and education ==
Jafar Masood Hassani Nadwi was born on 13 September 1965 in Takia, Raebareli, Uttar Pradesh, India, into a family with a strong Islamic scholarly background. His father, Wazeh Rashid Hasani Nadwi, was an Arabic writer and journalist, while his uncle, Mohammad Rabey Hasani Nadwi, was an Islamic scholar.

Nadwi completed his early education in Raebareli, memorized the Quran, and later enrolled at Darul Uloom Nadwatul Ulama, Lucknow. He received his Alimiyah degree in 1981 and Fazilah degree in 1983. He subsequently obtained an M.A. in Arabic from Lucknow University in 1986 and completed a teaching training course at King Saud University in 1990.

He was the son-in-law of Mohammad Rabey Hasani Nadwi, the former chancellor of Nadwatul Ulama.

== Career ==
Nadwi started his career in 1985 as a teacher of Hadith and Arabic literature at Madrasa Aliah Irfania, a branch of Nadwatul Ulama in Lucknow. During this time, he also taught social sciences and broadened his understanding of academic and Islamic subjects.

In 2013, he was appointed the managing editor of Al-Raid, an Arabic fortnightly journal published by Nadwatul Ulama, and in 2019, he became its editor-in-chief.

He held the position of Secretary (Nazir-e-Aam) of Nadwatul Ulama and also served as the Secretary of the Academy of Islamic Research and Publications (Urdu: مجلسِ تحقیقات و نشریاتِ اسلام), Lucknow. Additionally, he was the General Secretary and later became the President of the International League of Islamic Literature (Arabic: رابطة الأدب الإسلامي العالمية).

== Death ==
Nadwi died on 15 January 2025 in Lucknow, India, in a traffic accident on the Lucknow–Allahabad highway. He was 59. He was buried on 16 January 2025 in his family's ancestral graveyard at Takia Kalan, Raebareli. His funeral prayer was led by Bilal Abdul Hai Hasani Nadwi, the chancellor of Nadwatul Ulama, and was attended by a large number of people.

Public figures, including Khalid Saifullah Rahmani (President of the All India Muslim Personal Law Board), Akhilesh Yadav (President of the Samajwadi Party), Chandrashekhar Azad (Leader of the Azad Samaj Party), Sajjad Nomani, Akram Nadwi of Oxford University, Syed Ahmed Bukhari (Shahi Imam of Jama Masjid, Delhi), and Priyanka Gandhi (General Secretary of AICC), offered condolences. Expressions of grief were also received from notable individuals in India and abroad.

== Literary works ==
Nadwi started writing at an early age, producing scholarly and literary articles on topics such as literature, Islamic thought, and history, in both Urdu and Arabic. His writings were regularly published in Arabic in Al-Raid and in Urdu in Tameer-e-Hayat and other journals and newspapers. He also translated several Urdu articles, academic papers, literary works, and political writings into Arabic, along with full books. Some of his notable works include:

- Fī Masīrat al-Hayāt – Arabic translation of Karwan-e-Zindagi by Abul Hasan Ali Hasani Nadwi.
- Al-Shaykh Muhammad Yusuf al-Kandhlawi: Hayatuhu wa Manhajuhu fi al-Da'wah – Arabic translation of the Urdu book by Muhammad Saani Hasani Nadwi.
- Al-Imam al-Muhaddith Muhammad Zakariya al-Kandhlawi wa Ma'athiruhu al-Ilmiyyah – Arabic translation of the Urdu book by Abul Hasan Ali Hasani Nadwi.
- Da'wah lil-Ta'ammul wal-Tafkir – Original work in Urdu (Urdu: دعوت فکر و نظر).
- Basāir – Urdu translation of the Arabic book by Abul Hasan Ali Hasani Nadwi.
