= Burhanuddin Sambhali =

Indian Islamic scholar (1938–2020)

Muhammad Burhanuddin Sambhali
- محمد برہان الدین سنبھلی
- Born: 5 February 1938; Sambhal, Moradabad district, United Provinces, British India
- Died: 17 January 2020 (aged 81); Lucknow, India
- Occupations: Islamic scholar, teacher, jurist
- Known for: Teaching at Darul Uloom Nadwatul Ulama; founding member of All India Muslim Personal Law Board
- Awards: President's Certificate of Honour (2008)

Academic background
- Education: Darul Uloom Deoband

Muhammad Burhanuddin Sambhali (Urdu: محمد برہان الدین سنبھلی; 5 February 1938 – 17 January 2020) was an Indian Islamic scholar, teacher, and jurist associated with Darul Uloom Nadwatul Ulama in Lucknow. He was a founding member of the All India Muslim Personal Law Board and served in several academic and juristic institutions.

== Early life and education ==
Muhammad Burhanuddin Sambhali was born on 4 Dhu al-Hijjah 1356 AH (5 February 1938) in Sambhal, Moradabad district. His father, Muhammad Hamiduddin, was a scholar and a student of Anwar Shah Kashmiri.

He received his early education, including Arabic and Persian, from his father at Madrasa Hamidiya Tajwidul Qur'an, Sambhal, an institution founded by his father. He continued his studies at Madrasa Sirajul Uloom (Hilali Sarai), Madrasa al-Shar‘ (Katra Musa Khan), and Madrasa Darul Uloom al-Muhammadiya (Deepa Sarai) in Sambhal. Later, he enrolled at Darul Uloom Deoband in 1375 AH (1956), from where he graduated in 1377 AH (1958) after completing the Dars-i Nizami curriculum. He also passed the Molvi examination from the U.P. Arabic and Persian Board, Allahabad, in first division. His teachers at Deoband included Hussain Ahmed Madani, Syed Fakhruddin Ahmad, Ibrahim Balyawi, Muhammad Tayyib Qasmi, Fakhrul Hasan Moradabadi, and Mirajul Haq Deobandi.

== Career ==
Sambhali’s teaching career spanned about 63 years. After graduation, he briefly taught for two months at Madrasa Sirajul Uloom, Sambhal. He then taught for thirteen years at Madrasa Alia Arabia, Fatehpuri, Delhi. In 1390 AH (1970), upon the request of Abul Hasan Ali Hasani Nadwi, he joined Darul Uloom Nadwatul Ulama as a professor of tafsir, hadith, and fiqh, where he served for five decades. He also served for several years as the head of the Department of Tafsir at Darul Uloom Nadwatul Ulama. In his later years, he retired from teaching but continued mentoring students.

He was a founding member and executive committee member of the All India Muslim Personal Law Board. He also served as a member of the U.P. Religious Education Council, Darul Uloom Tajul Masajid (Bhopal), and Madrasa Shahi (Moradabad). He held positions such as vice-president of the Islamic Fiqh Academy (India) and president of the Qazi Council of the Central Darul Qaza (Uttar Pradesh).

After the death of Abul Hasan Ali Nadwi in 1999, his name was proposed for the presidency of the Personal Law Board in April 2000, but he withdrew his candidature to facilitate a consensus decision.

Following Muhammad Ishaq Sandelvi’s migration to Karachi in 1970, Sambhali became the director of the Majlis-e-Tahqiqat-e-Shariah (Research Council of Islamic Law) at Nadwatul Ulama.

In 2008, the Government of India honoured him with the President's Certificate of Honour for his contributions to the Arabic language.

He also served as a member of the Faculty of Theology at Aligarh Muslim University, Idarat al-Mabahith al-Fiqhiyyah (Jamiat Ulema-e-Hind), the Islamic Calendar Board of Malaysia, and the Malayalam Islamic Encyclopaedia project.

== Public engagements and statements ==
In September 2001 reporting of Prime Minister Atal B. Vajpayee's remark that the Ayodhya dispute would be "solved by March 2002", Sambhali was quoted as saying he was "surprised" by the Prime Minister's claim and asking with whom such parleys were being held. The article records Sambhali asserting that the All India Muslim Personal Law Board and its Babri Masjid sub-committee were the only competent Muslim authorities on the issue and that, to his knowledge, no responsible Muslim organisation had been in talks with the government.

In October 2001, press coverage of a clerical meeting in Lucknow reported Sambhali among the Sunni clerics who condemned the United States' strikes in Afghanistan and described the campaign as targeting Muslims. The report states the meeting criticised the Organisation of Islamic Conference for "virtually giving a nod" to the US action, called on the Muslim community to "unitedly condemn" the attacks, discussed forming an all-India body of clerics called Majlis-e-Ulema, and urged a boycott of Coca-Cola and Pepsi as a protest. The coverage also recorded voices at the meeting warning against communal provocation.

In October 2004 coverage of the public debate on family planning, the report records Sambhali among senior ulama who rejected Kalbe Sadiq's pro-family planning statement. The article quotes Sambhali as declaring family planning to be "against Islam" (khilaf-i-Islam) and as warning that Sadiq's statement could give non-Muslims "an excuse to rejoice" and create further problems for Muslims.

He is recorded as continuing to take part in AIMPLB and Nadwa meetings and appears on published lists of attendees and committee members; for example, he is named among participants in an AIMPLB executive meeting that discussed the Liberhan Commission report (2012) and is listed in published compilations of the Board's executive and working committees.

== Literary works ==
In addition to numerous research papers on Islamic jurisprudence, Sambhali authored and compiled several works, including:

- Qadaya Fiqhiyyah Mu‘asirah (transl. Contemporary Jurisprudential Issues)
- At-Taw’am al-Mutalasik – Nikahuhu wa Jinayatuhu wa Irthuhu (transl. Conjoined Twins – Their Marriage, Liability, and Inheritance)
- Bank Insurance aur Sarkari Qarze (transl. Bancassurance and government loans)
- Uniform Civil Code aur Aurton ke Huquq (transl. Uniform Civil Code and Women's Rights)
- Majmu‘ah Qawaneen-e-Islam muta‘alliq Muslim Personal Law Board (transl. Collection of Islamic Laws relating Muslim Personal Law Board)
- Chand Tibbī Masā’il (transl. Some medical problems)
- Maujuda Zamane ke Masā’il ka Shar‘i Hukm (transl. Shariah ruling on current issues)
- Chand Aham Deeni Mabāhith (transl. Some important religious discussions)
- Mu‘ashrati Masā’il Deen-e-Fitrat ki Roshni mein (transl. Social problems in the light of religion and nature)
- Maujuda Daur mein Kar-e-Nubuwwat Anjam Dene Walay (transl. Those who carry out the work of prophecy in the present era)
- Musalmanon ki Pareshaniyon ke Haqiqi Asbab wa Ilaj (transl. The real causes and solutions to the problems of Muslims)
- Do Aabdar Moti
- Chand Aham Kutub-e-Tafsir aur Quran Karim ke Tarjumay (transl. Some important books of Tafsir and translations of the Holy Quran)
- Khawatin-e-Islam ke Tuhfay (transl. Gifts for Islamic women)
- Guldasta-e-Ilm o Nazar (Maqalat o Mazamin) (a collection of his articles)
- Nafaqa al-Mutallaqah (transl. Maintenance of a divorced woman)
- Dars-e-Quran Karim (Commentary on Surahs Al-A‘raf, Yunus, and Hud)

== Death and legacy ==
Sambhali died on 21 Jumada al-Awwal 1441 AH (17 January 2020) in Lucknow. His funeral prayer was led by Mohammad Rabey Hasani Nadwi at Darul Uloom Nadwatul Ulama, and he was buried in the Daliganj cemetery. He was survived by two sons, Muhammad Nu‘manuddin Nadwi and Muhammad Safwanuddin Nadwi, and three daughters.
