= List of chancellors and principals of Darul Uloom Nadwatul Ulama =

Darul Uloom Nadwatul Ulama is an Islamic seminary in Lucknow, India. Established on 26 September 1898 by the Nadwatul Ulama, it is one of the major Islamic institutions in India.

The manager (nāzim) of the Nadwatul Ulama is the chancellor (sarparast/patron) of the Darul Uloom Nadwatul Ulama and the Principal is the executive head of the seminary.

== List of chancellors ==
No.	Name	Term of office		Reference
1	Muhammad Ali Mungeri	26 September 1898	19 July 1903	
2	Masihuzzaman Khan	20 July 1903	21 April 1905	
3	Khalilur Rahman Saharanpuri	1905	July 1915	
4	Abdul Hai Hasani	3 April 1915	2 February 1923	
5	Ali Hasan Khan		8 June 1931	
6	Hakeem Abdul Ali	9 June 1931	1961	
7	Abul Hasan Ali Hasani Nadwi	1961	31 December 1999	
8	Rabey Hasani Nadwi	2000	13 April 2023	
9	Bilal Abdul Hai Hasani Nadwi	14 April 2023	"incumbent"	

== List of principals ==
No.	Name	Term of office		Reference
1	Hafeezullah Azamgarhi		1931	
2	Abdullah Tonki			
3	Ameer Ali Maleehabadi			
4	Sher Ali Hyderabadi			
5	Hyder Hasan Khan	July 1932 (Rabiʽ al-Awwal 1351 AH)	December 1939 (Dhu al-Hijjah 1358 AH)	
6	Imran Khan Nadwi	1 January 1940	3 August 1958	
7	Muḥammad Ishaq Sandelwi	October 1956	1969 (Rajab 1389 AH)	
8	Muhibbullah Lari Nadwi	1970 (1389 AH)	29 November 1993	
9	Rabey Hasani Nadwi	1993	2000	
10	Saeed-ur-Rahman Azmi Nadvi	2000	7 October, 2026	
11	'Abdul 'Azīz Khalifah Bhatkalī Nadwī	October 2026		

== Bibliography ==
- Abul Hasan Ali Hasani Nadwi (2010). Purāne Chirāgh (in Urdu). Vol. 3 (3 ed.). Lucknow: Maktaba Firdous.
- Asir Adrawi (2 April 2016). Tazkirah Mashāhīr-e-Hind: Karwān-e-Rafta (in Urdu). Deoband: Darul Muallifeen.
