= Yasin Mazhar Siddiqui =

Indian Muslim scholar and historian (1944–2020)

Personal life
- Born: 26 December 1944 Lakhimpur Kheri, United Provinces of British India
- Died: 15 September 2020 (aged 75)
- Notable work(s): Tārīkh Tezeeb-e-Islāmi, The Prophet Muhammad: A Role Model for Muslim Minorities
- Education: Darul Uloom Nadwatul Ulama, University of Lucknow, Jamia Millia Islamia, Aligarh Muslim University

Religious life
- Religion: Islam

Senior posting
- Awards: Fifth Shah Waliullah Award

Yasin Mazhar Siddiqui (also known as Yasin Mazhar Siddique Nadvi) (26 December 1944 – 15 September 2020) was an Indian Sunni Muslim scholar and historian who served as director of the Institute of Islamic Studies of Aligarh Muslim University.

== Biography ==
Yasin Mazhar Siddiqui was born on 26 December 1944 in the Lakhimpur Kheri district of United Provinces of British India. He graduated in the traditional dars-e-nizami studies from Darul Uloom Nadwatul Ulama in 1959, and mastered in literature at the University of Lucknow in 1960. He passed the intermediate exams from the Jamia Millia Islamia in 1962 and then acquired B.A. in 1965 and B.Ed. in 1966 from the same university. In 1968, Siddīqi received his M.A. degree in History, M.Phil in 1969, and PhD in 1975 from the Aligarh Muslim University. His teachers included Abul Hasan Ali Nadwi, K. A. Nizami, Abd al-Hafīz Balyāwi and Rabey Hasani Nadwi.

Siddiqui was appointed a research assistant in the history department of Aligarh Muslim University (AMU) in 1970. He became a lecturer of History in 1977 and Saiyid Hamid transferred him to the Institute of Islamic Studies, (AMU) in 1983. He became a Professor of Islamic Studies in 1991 and served as the director of Institute of Islamic Studies (AMU) from 1997 to 2000. In 2001, he was appointed as the director of Shah Waliullah Research Cell of the Institute of Islamic Studies (AMU). He retired from the Institute of Islamic Studies on 31 December 2006 but retained the position of director of the Shah Waliullah Research Cell for ten years. Between 2000 and 2010, he arranged about ten national and international seminars about the different aspects of Shah Waliullah Dehlawi's life and wrote eighteen books.

Siddiqui was conferred with the fifth Shah Waliullah Award by Institute of Objective Studies, New Delhi on 24 September 2005. He died on 15 September 2020.

== Literary works ==
Siddiqui authored books including:

- Tārīkh Tehzeeb-e-Islāmi
- Ghazwāt ki Iqtesādi Ehmiyat
- Tawhīd-e-Ilāhi awr mufassirīn-e-girāmi
- Wahi-e-Hadīth
- Ehd-e-Nabwi mai Tanzīm-e-Riyāsat-o-Hukūmat
- The Prophet Muhammad: A Role Model for Muslim Minorities
- Catalogue of Arabic Manuscripts at the Aligarh Muslim University, published by Al-Furqan Islamic Heritage Foundation in London in 2002.
- Ma'ash Nabawi: Rasulullah Ke Zarayi' Aamdan ka Teheeqi Jayzah
