= Bilal Abdul Hai Hasani Nadwi =

Indian Islamic scholar (b. 1969)

Mawlānā Bilal Abdul Hai Hasani Nadwi

9th Chancellor of Darul Uloom Nadwatul Ulama
- Incumbent
- Assumed office 14 April 2023
- Preceded by: Rabey Hasani Nadwi

General Secretary of Payam-e-Insaniyat
- Incumbent
- Assumed office 30 January 2013
- Preceded by: Abdullah Hasani Nadwi

Member of the executive council of Darul Uloom Deoband
- Incumbent
- Assumed office 29 August 2023
- Preceded by: Rabey Hasani Nadwi

Secretary of Nadwatul Ulama
- In office 11 May 2021 – 6 May 2023
- Preceded by: Hamza Hasani Nadwi
- Succeeded by: Jafar Masood Hasani Nadwi

Personal life
- Born: 3 October 1969 (age 56) Takia Kalan, Raebareli district, Uttar Pradesh, India
- Parent: Mohammad al-Hasani (father)
- Education: Darul Uloom Nadwatul Ulama
- Occupation: Islamic scholar, Da'i, murshid
- Relatives: Abdul Hai Hasani (his great-grandfather); Abul Hasan Ali Hasani Nadwi (his grandfather's brother); Rabey Hasani Nadwi (his father's cousin); Wazeh Rashid Hasani Nadwi (his father's cousin); Abdullah Hasani Nadwi (elder brother)

Religious life
- Religion: Islam
- Denomination: Sunni Islam
- Jurisprudence: Hanafi
- Tariqa: Chishtiyya-Qadiriyya-Suhrawardiyya-Naqshbandiyya-Muhammadiyya Ahmadiyya
- Creed: Maturidi

Muslim leader
- Disciple of: Muhammad Rabey Hasani Nadwi and Sayed Nafees al-Hussaini

Bilal Abdul Hai Hasani Nadwi (born 3 October 1969) is an Indian Islamic scholar, da'i, Hadith lecturer and author who has served as the Chancellor of Darul Uloom Nadwatul Ulama since 2023. He also serves as the General Secretary of the Payam-e-Insaniyat and a member of the executive council of Darul Uloom Deoband.

== Early life and education ==
Nadwi was born on 3 October 1969, in Takia Kalan, Raebareli, India. His father Mohammad al-Hasani was an Islamic scholar, founder, and editor-in-chief of the Arabic magazine Al-Baas El-Islami. His grandfather, Syed Abdul Ali Hasani, was the elder brother of Abul Hasan Ali Nadwi and the 6th chancellor of Darul Uloom Nadwatul Ulama. His great-grandfather, Abdul Hai Hasani was a writer who wrote the biographical book, Nuzhat al-Khawātir. Nadwi is a descendant of Hasan ibn Hasan and Hasan ibn Ali through Syed Ahmad Barelvi.

Nadwi lost his father at ten, and was raised by his elder brother Abdullah Hasani Nadwi. He received his primary education in his native land, under the supervision of Abul Hasan Ali Hasani Nadwi. After that, he enrolled in Darul Uloom Nadwatul Ulama for higher education and completed the Aalimiyyah course in 1988 and the Fazīlah course in 1990 there.

He received an Ijazah in Hadith from Abul Hasan Ali Hasani Nadwi, Abdur Rashīd Nomani, Abd al-Fattah Abu Ghudda, Abdullah ibn Abdul Aziz al-Aqīl, Yunus Jaunpuri, Ahmad Hasan Tonki, and Shaikh Ahmad Shafi. He is an authorised disciple of Muhammad Rabey Hasani Nadwi and Sayed Nafees al-Hussaini in Tariqah.

== Career ==
In 1991, Nadwi began his career as a teacher of hadith at Madrasa Ziyaul Uloom in Raebareli. He subsequently joined Darul Uloom Nadwatul Ulama where he lectures on Islamic thought. He succeeded his brother as the general secretary of the Payam-e-Insaniyat in 2013.

On 11 May 2021, Nadwi became the elected secretary of Nadwatul Ulama, and succeeded Rabey Hasani Nadwi as the chancellor of Nadwatul Ulama on 14 April 2023, and as a member of the executive council of Darul Uloom Deoband on 29 August 2023. He was also the deputy moderator of Madrasa Ziyaul Uloom Raebareli, editor-in-chief of Payām-e-Arafāt, director of Imam Abi al-Hasan An-Nadwi in Raebareli, and a member of the executive council of Nadwatul Ulama. In June 2023, he was appointed to the board of the All India Muslim Personal Law Board (AIMPLB) as a secretary.

In September 2023, when the AIMPLB decided to launch an India-wide campaign for helping Muslim women secure inheritance rights according to the Shariah; Nadwi was made responsible for its Tafheem-e-Shariat Committee, a group formed to support people with interpretation of the Islamic law.

== Literary works ==
Nadwi edited several books by Abul Hasan Ali Hasani. His works in Urdu include:

- Mabādi'u Wa Usool Fi 'Ilm al-Hadith (in Arabic)
- Sawāneh-e-Mufakkir-e-Islam
- Islāmi Aqā'id
- Tauheed Kiya Hoga?
- Aasān Ma'āni-e-Quran (Hindu: Pavitra Quran Ka Saral Anuvad)
- Sihāh-e-Sitta Aur Unke Musannifeen: Imtiyāzāt o Khusoosiyyāt
- Sahāba Ka Maqām o Martaba (Arabic: Makānat-us-Sahābah Fi Zau' al-Quran Was-Sunnah)
- Hadith Ki Roshni
- Quran Aur Sahib-e-Quran
- Ghazawāt-e-Rasool Insaniyat Ke Liye Ek Namūna
- Ilm, Insaniyat Ki Zaroorat
- Tahreek-e-Payām-e-Insaniyat
- Rahmatul-lil-'Aālameen Ki Sarapa Rahmat Ta'leemāt
- Mufakkir-e-Islam Maulana Syed Abul Hasan Ali Nadwi: Manhaj-e-Fikr-o-Da'wat (Arabic: Manhaj-ush-Shaykh Abi-l-Hasan Ali Nadwi Fi-l-Fikr Wal-Da'wah)
- Qādiyaniyyat: Manzar Aur Pas-Manzar
