= Masihuzzaman Khan =

Indian scholar

Masīhuzzamān Khān

2nd Chancellor of Darul Uloom Nadwatul Ulama
- In office 20 July 1903 – 21 April 1905
- Preceded by: Muhammad Ali Mungeri
- Succeeded by: Khalilur Rahman Saharanpuri

Personal life
- Born: 1840; Shahjahanpur, Mughal India
- Died: 17 December 1910 (aged 69–70); Shahjahanpur, British India

Religious life
- Religion: Islam

Masīhuzzamān Khān (1840 – 17 December 1910) was an Indian Muslim scholar who served as the second chancellor of Darul Uloom Nadwatul Ulama. He was the teacher of Mir Laiq Ali Khan and Mahboob Ali Khan.

== Biography ==
Masīhuzzamān Khān was born in 1840 (1256 AH) in Shahjahanpur. He received his primary education from Aḥmad Ali Shahabādi, and then went to Hyderabad to study with his own brother, Muḥammad Zamān Khān.

After the completion of studies, Khān became the teacher of Mir Laiq Ali Khan and Mīr Sa'ādat Ali Khān, both the sons of Mir Turab Ali Khan. In Muharram 1293 AH, he was appointed the teacher of Mahboob Ali Khan, the sixth Nizam of Hyderabad. Three years later, he was appointed the manager of all the educational issues of the Nizam. Following the death of Mir Turab Ali Khan in 1300 AH, a new council was formed and Khurshīd Jah and Narendra Prashad were appointed its members. They were displeased with Masīhuzzamān Khān and reduced his position and sent him a pension warrant on 4 Muharram 1301 AH. Four months later, he returned to Shahjahanpur. Khān attended the second general meeting of the Nadwatul Ulama in 1895 in Lucknow and was appointed a managing member. He was appointed an interim manager of the Nadwatul Ulama for three years following the resignation of Muhammad Ali Mungeri on 19 July 1903. Al-Nadwah, the journal of the Nadwatul Ulama was started from Shahjahanpur, while he was the manager. He resigned from the Nadwatul Ulama on 21 April 1905. He died on 17 December 1910.
