= Abdul Hai Hasani =

Indian Islamic scholar and writer (1869–1923)

Maulana, Hakīm Syed Abdul Hai Hasani

4th Chancellor of Darul Uloom Nadwatul Ulama
- In office 3 April 1915 – 2 February 1923
- Preceded by: Khalilur Rahman Saharanpuri
- Succeeded by: Ali Hasan Khan

Assistant Chancellor of Darul Uloom Nadwatul Ulama
- In office 25 December 1895 – 3 April 1915

Personal details
- Born: Syed Ahmad; 22 December 1869 Raebareli, North-Western Provinces, British India
- Died: 2 February 1923 (aged 53) Lucknow, United Provinces of Agra and Oudh, British India
- Resting place: Dāira-e-Shah Alamullah, Takia Kalan, Raebareli
- Children: Abdul Ali Hasani; Abul Hasan Ali Hasani Nadwi

Personal life
- Notable work: Nuzhat al-Khawatir

Religious life
- Religion: Islam
- Denomination: Sunni
- Jurisprudence: Hanafi
- Movement: Deobandi

Muslim leader
- Students: Abdur Rahman Kashgari Sulaiman Nadvi

Syed Abdul Hai Hasani (1869–1923) was an Indian Islamic scholar, historian, biographer, writer, Sufi, and Hakim. He served as the fourth Chancellor of Darul Uloom Nadwatul Ulama between 1915 and 1923. He was the father of Abul Hasan Ali Hasani Nadwi. His works include Nuzhat al-Khawātir, Al Hind Fil 'Ahd al-Islami, Ath' Thaqafat al-Islamiyya Fil-Hind, Yād-Ayyām, and Gul-e-Ra'na.

== Early life and education ==
Syed Abdul Hai Hasani was born on 22 December 1869 in Raibareli. His father, Fakhruddin Khayali, was a writer and poet. He was a descendant of Hasan II ibn Hasan ibn Ali through Syed Ahmad Barelvi. He was the father of Abul Hasan Ali Hasani Nadwi.

After reading the elementary books of Persian and Arabic in Haswa and Raibareli, he went to Allahabad, stayed there for about two years, and studied under Muhammad Hussain Allahabadi and other scholars. He stayed in Fatehpur for a few months and read a jurisprudence book by Noor Muhammad Punjabi. In the year 1301 AH (1883–84), he visited his father in Bhopal and studied with the scholars there. At that time, Bhopal was called the centre of knowledge and scholars because of Jamaluddin Khan and Siddiq Hasan Khan.

In 1303 AH (1886), he returned to his homeland from Bhopal, and after a few days, he went to Lucknow and read Tafsir al-Jalalayn from Amir Ali Malihabadi, Hidayat al-Hikmah, etc., from Fazlullah Firangi Mahali, and Al-Hidayah, As-Sirajiyyah, Sharh al-'Aqaid, and Nakhbat-ul-Fikr from Muhammad Naeem Farangi Mahali. He further read other textbooks by Maulvi Altaf Hussain, Fatah Muhammad Taib Lakhnavi, and Ahmad Shah Wilayati. He stayed in Lucknow for around five years, and during that period he appeared in the service of his namesake, Abd al-Hayy al-Lucknawi, albeit Hasani did not become his student. Around the time of his return from Bhopal and his move to Lucknow, he stayed for some time in Kanpur and studied some parts of Sharh Jami, Usul al-Shashi, and Qutbi from Ashraf Ali Thanwi and Fatah Muhammad Thanvi, the teachers of Jamiul Uloom Patkapur.

Around 1309 AH (1891–92), he left Lucknow for his native Raibareli, and after his marriage, after some time in his native land, he returned to Bhopal to read the remaining textbooks by Abdul Haq Kabuli. He learned mathematics from Syed Ahmad Dehlavi and Arabic literature from Sheikh Muhammad Arab. He studied Sihah Sittah from Shaykh Hussain bin Muhsin al-Yamāni and obtained ijazah in hadith from him. During his stay in Bhopal, Hasani learned the science of hikmah from Hakīm Abdul Ali of Lucknow, who lived there. In 1311 AH, he read the book of medicine, Al-Qanoon from Hakīm Abdul Aziz in Lucknow.

From a young age, he continued to benefit spiritually from his family elders and sought esoteric knowledge, particularly from Abdus Salam Haswi. Following Haswi's death, he corresponded with Imdadullah Muhajir Makki, plugged allegiance to him in absentia, and was authorized in bay'ah by him. He pledged allegiance to Fazl-e-Rahman Ganj Muradabadi, but because to academic duties, he was unable to benefit from him in this regard, although obtaining his authorization in Hadith. He obtained formal Sufism instruction from Syed Zia-un-Nabi, Fakhruddin Khayali, and Hakeem Aminuddin, and he was granted permission to practice all four traditions of Qadiriyya-Chishtiyya-Suhrawardiyya-Naqshbandiyya.

After graduation, he undertook a scholarly journey at the age of 26. The journey started on 12 January 1895, from Haswa, Fatehpur, and ended on 21 February 1895. In between, he visited Delhi, Panipat, Sirhind, Camp Ambala, Deoband, Piran Kaliyar, Saharanpur, Gangoh, Nagina, and its several towns and met Syed Nazeer Husain Dehlavi, Maulana Abdul Ali (Principal of Madrasa Abd-ur-Rab Delhi), Abd-ur-Rahman Panipati, Sain Tawakkul Shah Ambalvi, Zulfiqar Ali Deobandi (Mahmud Hasan Deobandi's father), Rashid Ahmad Gangohi, Mian Muhammad Hussain (friend and servant of Syed Ahmad Barelvi), and Ahmad Hasan Amrohi (student of Muhammad Qasim Nanautavi) and obtained permission in Hadith from them.

== Career ==
In 1311 AH, when he started studying Al-Qunoon from Hakīm Abdul Aziz in Lucknow, he also practiced medicine under Hakīm Abdul Ali and continued to practice medicine until the end of 1312 AH (early 1895).

He had not completed his medical studies when the Nadwatul Ulama was formed, but he attended its meetings from the beginning. In Safar 1313 AH (1895 AD), at the age of 27, he founded Anjuman Aal-e-Hashim for the welfare of his family and its reformation.

In 1313 AH, he began working under Muhammad Ali Mungeri, the founder and first chancellor of Nadwatul Ulama. On 25 December 1895, Mungeri appointed him as the assistant chancellor of Nadwatul Ulama. On 3 April 1915, he succeeded Khalilur Rahman Saharanpuri as chancellor of Nadwatul Ulama and remained in the position until his demise.

In 1905 (1313 AH), when the office of Nadwatul Ulama was moved from Shahjahanpur to Lucknow, he decided to serve Nadwatul Ulama voluntarily without salary, and he began practicing medicine and made it his livelihood for life.

In addition to his official duties, he also served as a teacher of Arabic literature and Ifta in Darul Uloom Nadwatul Ulama for some time in the beginning. His students included Syed Sulaiman Nadvi and Abdur Rahman Kashgari.

== Literary works ==
Hasani authored Nuzhat al-Khawatir, an eight-volume biographical encyclopedia with almost 4,500 Muslim personalities from South Asia, mostly scholars, in Arabic. His son, Abul Hasan Ali Hasani Nadwi, completed the unfinished last volume.

His book Ma'ārif al-'Awārif Fi Anwā' al-Uloom Wal Ma'ārif (Ath' Thaqafat al-Islamiyya Fil-Hind) contains a detailed and complete analysis of the history of education in India, the evolution of the curriculum and its period-by-period changes, and a detailed analysis of the literary work of the thousand-year Islamic era of India. The Urdu translation of this book has been published by Nadwatul Musannifeen, entitled Islami Uloom o Funoon Hindustan Mein (transl. Islamic Sciences and Arts in India).

He wrote a book in Arabic called Jannat al-Mashriq Wa Matla' an-Noor al-Mushriq (Al Hind Fil 'Ahd al-Islami) on the Islamic history of India, the Sultans of Islam, the Islamic culture here, mosques, madrasas, Islamic structures, hospitals, and other features.

At the request of Nawab Habibur Rahman Khan Sherwani, he wrote a treatise on Gujarat's achievements during the Islamic period to be presented at the All India Muhammadan Educational Conference, held in Surat in December 1918. The treatise published by the conference later under the title of Yād-e-Ayyām.

His other books included:

- Gul-e-Ra'na (a book in Urdu containing mentions of Urdu poets)
- Talkhīs al-Akhbār (a collection of hadiths of the Prophet on everyday essential topics)
- Muntaha al-Afkār (an Arabic commentary on Talkhīs al-Akhbār)
- Tadhkirat-ul-Abrār (a book in Persian containing the mentions of the scholars and Mashaikhs of the Qutbia Hasainiyya family)
- Kitāb al-Ghina Fil Islām (in Arabic; transl. Singing in Islam)
- Qarabādīn (a collection of medical prescriptions in Urdu)
- Armaghān-e-Ahbāb (a travelogue in Urdu)
- Tabīb-ul-'āilah (a guide book for the treatment of daily ailments of women and children in Urdu)
- Sharh Sab'a Mu'allaqa (an uncomplicated Arabic commentary on Mu'allaqat)
- Raihānat-ul-Adab wa Shamāmat-ut-Tarb (a book in Arabic literature)
- Ta'līmul Islām (Islamic guide book on solving daily problems in Urdu)
- Noor-ul-Īmān (an educational book written for children in Urdu)
- Risāla Dar Bayān-e-Salāsil-e-Khānwāda-e-Naqshbandiyya
- Ta'līqāt 'Ala Sunan Abi Dawud (an uncomplicated Arabic commentary on Sunan Abi Dawud)
- Al-Qānoon Fi Intifā' al-Murtahin bi al-Marhoon (in Arabic; transl. The law regarding the mortgagee’s benefit from the mortgaged property)

== Personal life ==
On Jumada al-Akhirah 7, 1309 AH (10 December 1891), Hasani married the daughter of his maternal uncle Moulvi Syed Abdul Aziz, with whom he had a son, Hakīm Abdul Ali Hasani, the sixth chancellor of Darul Uloom Nadwatul Ulama, and she died in 1319 AH.

After the death of his first wife, he married Shah Ziya-un-Nabi's daughter Khair-un-Nisa Behtar in 1322 AH (1904 AD), from whom he had one son, Abul Hasan Ali Hasani Nadwi, and two daughters, Amat-ul-Azīz (mother of Muhammad Rabey Hasani Nadwi) and Amatullah Tasnīm (Urdu translator of Riyāḍ aṣ-Ṣāliḥīn).

== Death ==
Hasani died on Friday, 2 February 1923 (Jumada al-Akhirah 15, 1341 AH) in Lucknow. The body was taken to Raebareli. The next day, on 3 February (Jumada al-Akhirah 16), Hafeezullah Azamgarhi, Principal of Darul Uloom Nadwatul Ulama, led the funeral prayer, and he was buried at the lower side of the graves of the elders of the family, Shah Alamullah and Syed Muhammad Adl.

== See also ==
- List of Deobandis
