= Madrasa Sirajul Uloom =

Madarsa in Uttar Pradesh, India

Madrasa Sirajul Uloom مدرسہ سراج العلوم ہلالی سراءے سنبھل
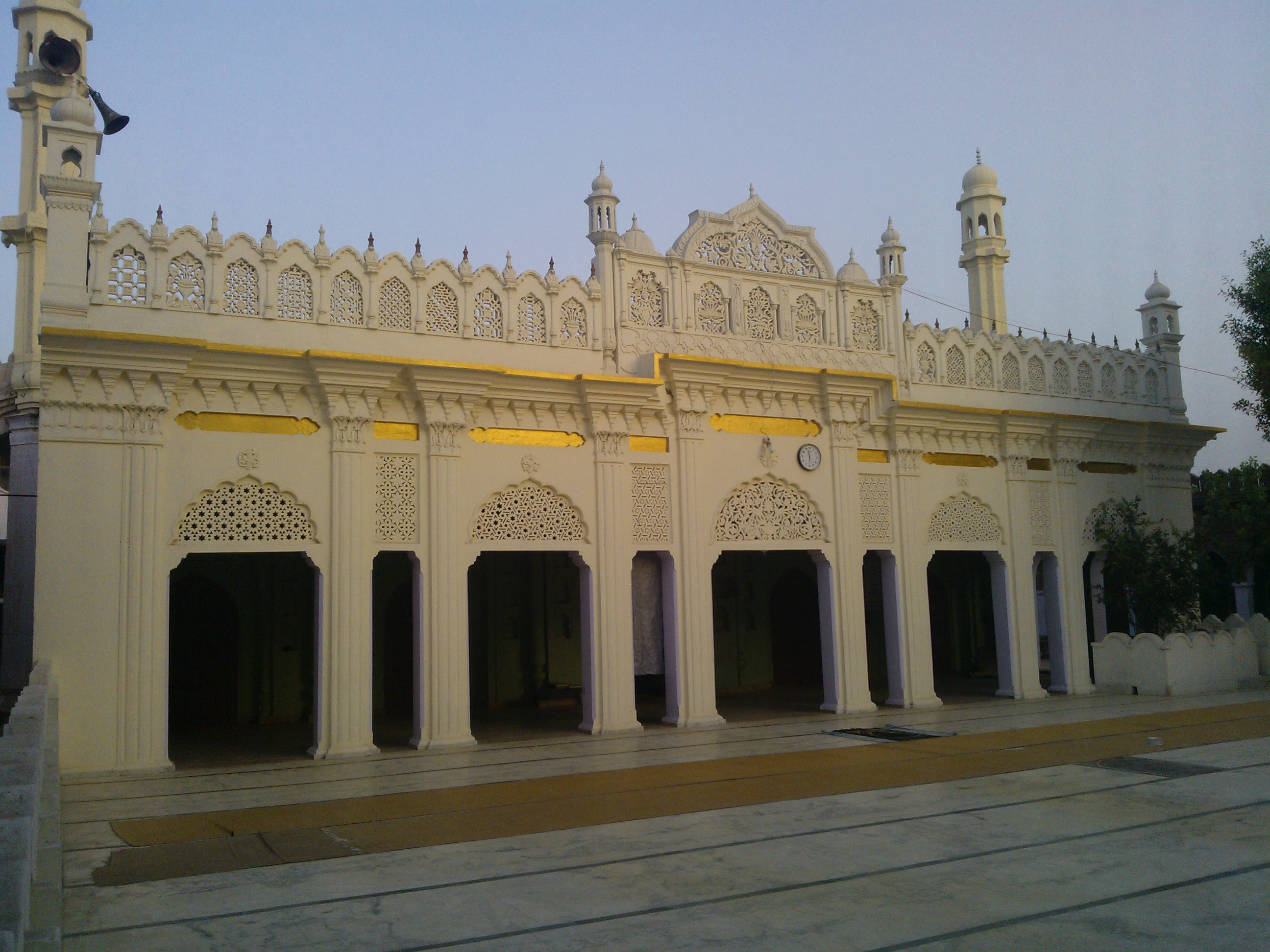
- Mosque at Madrasa Sirajul Uloom Premises
- Type: Islamic Institute
- Affiliation: Darul Uloom Nadwatul Ulama
- Principal: Mohammad Miyan Qasmi
- Location: Sambhal, Uttar Pradesh, India
- Campus: Urban
- Website: Madrasa Sirajul Uloom Official website

Madrasa Sirajul Uloom Urdu: مدرسہ سراج العلوم, Sambhal is an old Madrasa (theological Institute) established in Sambhal city of Uttar Pradesh, India. It was established by Maulana Khaleel Ahmad Israili back in 1902 AD in the commemoration of Maulana Siraj Israili, his middle name Siraj serves as the eponym for Sirajul Uloom. Among its alumni, Manzoor Nomani, Burhanuddin Sambhali and Maulana Asad Israili are famous for their contribution in the field of theology Freedom fighter Maulana Ismail Sambhali also studied Dars-i Nizami in Madrasa Sirajul Uloom

== Faculties ==
There are six Islamic educational faculties at Madrasa Sirajul Uloom:

- Shoba e Dars e Nizami (Dept. of Islamic law studies)
- Shoba e Arbi jadeed (Dept. of Modern Arabic language)
- Shoba e Niswan (Separate section for Girls)
- Shoba e Hifz o Tajweed (Dept. of Qur'an recitation studies)
- Foqaniya (Upper Primary section)
- Tahtaniya(Primary Section)

== See also ==
- Government Degree College Sambhal
- Darul Uloom Nadwatul Ulama
- Darul Uloom Deoband
