= Muhibbullah Lari Nadwi =

Indian Islamic scholar (1917 – 1993)

Muhibbullah Lari Nadwi Maulana

8th Principal of Darul Uloom Nadwatul Ulama
- In office 1970 – 29 November 1993
- Preceded by: Muḥammad Ishaq Sandelwi
- Succeeded by: Rabey Hasani Nadwi

Personal details
- Born: 15 July 1917 Lar, Uttar Pradesh
- Died: 29 November 1993 (aged 76)
- Education: Nadwa, Aligarh Muslim University Aligarh
- Profession: Islamic scholar

Muhibbullah Lari Nadwi (or Mohibullah Lari; 15 July 1917 – 29 November 1993) was an Indian Islamic scholar, who served as a principal of the Darul Uloom Nadwatul Ulama from 1970 to 1993.

== Early life ==
Mohibullah Lari was born on 15 July 1917 in Lar Uttar Pradesh. He took his early education in Islamic studies at Darul Uloom Nadwatul Ulama, Lucknow obtaining an Aalim degree in 1930 and a Fazil-e-Adab degree in 1932, respectively. It is noteworthy that he was a classmate of Abul Hasan Ali Hasani Nadwi in Hadith class during the last year of his stay at the aforementioned Darul Uloom. Thereafter he studied at AMU Aligarh and completed, respectively, a B.A.(1939) and M.A. in Political Science (1942).

== Career ==
Firstly, he started a business making leather goods in Kanpur from 1940 to 1968. In 1968 he was appointed a Principal at Darul Uloom Nadwatul Ulama Lucknow. He performed the aforementioned administrative work until he died in 1993. During his tenure, the academic standard including the publication department and growth in the number of students at the school was noted by the rector Abul Hasan Ali Hasani Nadwi. He produced many articles and columns on literature, society, political, and religion in his career. He was a member of the executive council, DARUL ULOOM TAJUL MASAJID until he died in 1993.

== Death ==
Mohibullah Lari Nadwi died on 29 November 1993 in Lucknow.
