= Manzoor Nomani =

Indian Islamic scholar

Muhammad Manzoor Nomani
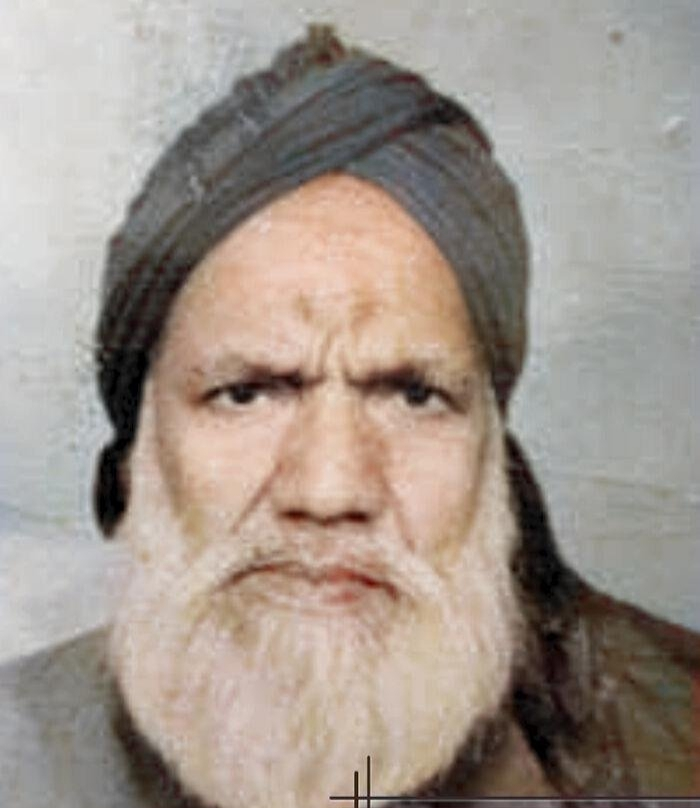

Personal life
- Born: c. 15 December 1905 Sambhal, United Provinces of Agra and Oudh, British India
- Died: 4 May 1997 (aged 91) Lucknow, Uttar Pradesh, India
- Main interest(s): Hadith studies, Polemics
- Education: Madrasa Islamiay Arabiya Sirajul Uloom Sambhal; Darul Uloom Deoband
- Occupation: Islamic scholar, writer, debator
- Relatives: Sajjad Nomani (Son)

Religious life
- Religion: Islam
- Denomination: Sunni Islam
- Jurisprudence: Hanafi
- Movement: Deobandi, Jamaat-e-Islami (Till 1942) , Tablighi jamaat

Muslim leader
- Disciple of: Abdul Qadir Raipuri; Hussain Ahmad Madani
- Influenced by: Azizur Rahman Usmani, Abdul Qadir Raipuri, Hussain Ahmad Madani, Ilyas Kandhlavi, Abul A'la Maududi, Anwar Shah Kashmiri
- Influenced: Sajjad Nomani

Muḥammad Manz̤oor Nomānī (c. 15 December 1905 – 4 May 1997) was an Indian Islamic scholar. Prominent among his written works are Maariful Hadith, Islam Kya Hai?, and Khomeini and the Iranian Revolution.

He graduated from Darul Uloom Deoband in 1927, where he studied hadith under Anwar Shah Kashmiri. He held the post of Shaykh al-Hadith at Darul Uloom Nadwatul Ulama for four years, and was a close associate of Abul Hasan Ali Nadwi. A founding member of Jamaat-e-Islami in 1941, he was elected the group's Deputy Amir, second to Abul A'la Maududi. However, in 1942, following disagreements with Maududi he led a group in resigning from the organization. Afterwards he became affiliated with the Tablighi Jamaat of Muhammad Ilyas Kandhlawi. He served on the Majlis-e-Shura and Majlis-e-Amilah (Executive Council) of Darul Uloom Deoband and was a member of the Muslim World League.

He was the father of the renowned Indian Islamic scholar and muhaddith, Maulana Sajjad Nomani.

== Biography ==
Manzoor Nomani was born on 15 December 1905 (18 Shawwal 1323 AH) in Sambhal, United Provinces of Agra and Oudh, British India. His father, Sufi Muhammad Husain, was a moderately wealthy businessman and landlord. Nomani received his primary education in his hometown, graduating from Madrasa Sirajul Uloom Hilali Sarai Sambhal. Later he studied at Darul Uloom Mau. Finally he enrolled at Darul Uloom Deoband where he remained for two years. He graduated in 1345 AH (1927), receiving the highest marks in the examination for dawrah hadith. Among his teachers at Darul Uloom Deoband were Anwar Shah Kashmiri, Azizur Rahman Usmani, and Siraj Ahmad Rashidi.

After completing his studies he taught for three years at Madrasa Chilla, Amroha. Thereafter for four years he held the post of Shaykh al-Hadith at Darul Uloom Nadwatul Ulama, Lucknow.

In 1934 (1353 AH) he established a monthly journal, al-Furqan, from Bareilly. The journal began with a focus towards polemics, but in 1942 (1361 AH) it became more of an academic and religious journal.

Nomani was a founding member of Jamaat-e-Islami. At its Founding Session in August 1941 he led the seven-member committee that proposed Sayyid Abul A'la Maududi as Amir. He himself was selected as Na'ib Amir (Deputy Amir). Six months later, in 1942, Nomani arrived at the Jamaat's Darul Islam community in Pathankot with the intention of permanently settling there. He was appointed the first Muhtasib of Darul Islam. However, due to differences with Maududi he left Jamaat-i Islami in August/September 1942 (Sha'ban 1361 AH) and returned home to Sambhal. Detailing his time with Maududi and the reasons for his departure from Jamaat-i Islami he wrote Maulana Maududi ke sath meri rifaqat ki sarguzasht aur ab mera mauqif (1980).

After leaving Jamaat-e-Islami, he and Abul Hasan Ali Nadwi became affiliated with the Tablighi Jamaat movement. Nomani's compilation of the malfuzat (sayings) of Muhammad Ilyas comes from the period of 1943 to 1944, mostly during Ilyas's final illness.

In 1943 (1362 AH) he was appointed a member of the Majlis-e-Shura of Darul Uloom Deoband. He regularly attended its meetings and those of the Majlis-e-Amilah (Executive Council).

In 1984 he published an influential work criticising Ruhollah Khomeini and Shi'ism: Īrānī inqilāb, Imām K͟humainī, aur Shīʻiyat or "Khomeini, Iranian Revolution and Shi'ite faith".

He died in Lucknow on 4 May 1997 and is buried in Aishbagh.

== Literary works ==
- Islām kyā hai (1952)
- Dīn o sharī‘at (1958)
- Qur’ān āp se kyā kihtā hai
- Ma‘āriful-Ḥadīs̱
- Kalimah-yi ṭayyibah kī ḥaqīqat
- Namāz kī ḥaqīqat
- Āp Ḥajj kaise karaiṉ
- Barakāt-i Ramaẓān
- Taḥqīq mas’alah-yi īṣāl-i s̱awāb
- Tasawwuf kyā hai
- Taẕkirah-yi Imām-i Rabbānī (1959)
- Malfūz̤āt-i Maulānā Muḥammad Ilyās (1950)
- Bawāriqul-ghaib
- Haẓrat Shāh Ismā‘īl Shahīd par mu‘ānidīn ke ilzāmāt (1957)
- K͟hāksār taḥrīk
- Qur’ān ‘ilm kī roshnī meṉ
- Islām aur kufr ke ḥudūd
- Qādiyānī kyūṉ Musalmān nahīṉ
- Saif-i Yamānī
- Maulānā Maudūdī ke sāth merī rifāqat kī sarguzasht aur ab merā mauqif
- Shaik͟h Muḥammad ibn ‘Abdul-Wahhāb ke k͟hilāf propaiganḍah aur Hindūstān ke ‘ulama’-i ḥaqq par us ke as̱arāt
- Īrānī inqilāb, Imām K͟humainī, aur Shīʻiyat(1984) or Khomeini, Iranian Revolution and Shi'ite faith.
- Alfiatul Hadith
