= Abdur Rahman Kashgari =

Arabic scholar

Allamah Abdur Rahman Kashgari Nadwi
- ئابدۇرراھمان كاشغەرىي
- Mawlana Abdur Rahman Kashgari

Personal life
- Born: 15 September 1912 Tashmiliq, Kashgar, East Turkestan
- Died: April 1971 (aged 58) Dacca, East Pakistan
- Main interest: Linguistics
- Education: Nadwatul Ulama, Lucknow; University of Lucknow

Religious life
- Religion: Islam
- Denomination: Sunni
- Jurisprudence: Hanafi

Muslim leader
- Teacher: Abdul Hai Hasani
- Students: Muhammad Fakhruddin Muhiuddin Khan A. K. Fazlul Huq Nurul Islam Hashemi
- Influenced by: Al-Suyuti Shah Waliullah Dehlawi

Khatib of Baitul Mukarram
- In office 1963 – April 1971
- Preceded by: Post established
- Succeeded by: Amimul Ehsan Barkati

Head Mawlana of Dhaka Alia Madrasa
- In office 1969 – April 1971
- Preceded by: Amimul Ehsan Barkati
- Succeeded by: Ahmad Hossain Chowdhury

Abdur Rahman Kashgari (15 September 1912 – 3 April 1971) was one of the leading scholars of the Arabic language and literature in the Indian subcontinent. Of Uyghur background, Kashgari migrated from East Turkestan to India at an early age, completing his studies in Lucknow where he became an accomplished Islamic scholar, linguist, poet and author. He then migrated to Bengal (present-day Bangladesh), where he eventually became the principal of Dhaka Alia Madrasa. Kashgari was also the first khatib of the Baitul Mukarram National Mosque, holding this role until his death.

== Early life and education ==
Abdur Rahman was born in the village of Tashmiliq in Kashgar, East Turkestan (present-day Xinjiang, China). His father, Abdul Hadi Damolla, (Note: According to Muhammad Qasim Hajim, his father's name was ʿUmar ibn ʿAbd al-Ḥakīm ibn Bakr.) was a local Uyghur mullah popularly referred to as Beit-Akhunum. As a result of instability in their home region following the 1911 Revolution and the establishment of the Republic of China, his father, elder brother and two sisters were arrested by the new regime and the family property was taken away. His maternal uncle suggested to Abdur Rahman's mother that they join the Muslim refugee groups migrating to the subcontinent with the assistance of a guerrilla force. However, Abdur Rahman's mother hoped for her family to eventually be freed and so she remained in Kashgar though Abdur Rahman was keen on furthering his Islamic studies in India.

Abdur Rahman's initial education began under the local Islamic scholars in Kashgar. After leaving behind his family in Kashgar, eleven-year old Abdur Rahman joined the caravan towards India. They passed through Karakol and the Pamir Mountains, eventually reaching a place called Dukhan in Afghanistan. From there, they reached a place called Barik near Fayzabad, Badakhshan. From there, they reached Chitral via Zebak where they received assistance from Mehtar Amir ul-Mulk, and subsequently went to Dargai. After months of walking on foot, they finally went from Dargai to Amritsar via rail. The adviser there appeared in the services of Maulana Abdullah Minhas, in whose name the Mehtar of Chitral had kindly written a letter of recommendation. According to the Mehtar's instructions, he served Abdul Hai Hasani, principal of the Darul Uloom Nadwatul Ulama in Lucknow, British India. Finding refuge in the Nadwatul Ulama orphanage in 1922, he became a student at the same institute up-to higher level, gaining a strong grounding in the Islamic sciences such as Hadith studies, tafsir, Arabic literature and other subjects under Abdul Hai Hasani. He graduated from Nadwatul Ulama in 1347 AH (1929 CE). He then went on to study at the University of Lucknow where he received a Fazil-e-Adab degree. Kashgari received a certificate in the seven qira'at from the Madrasa-e-Furqania.

== Career ==
After completing his studies, Kashgari became a teacher at his alma mater, the Darul Uloom Nadwatul Ulama. At the request of A. K. Fazlul Huq, the Prime Minister of Bengal, who visited him in Lucknow, Kashgari moved to Bengal where he became a teacher at the Calcutta Alia Madrasa in 1938. In Calcutta, he taught Islamic jurisprudence and its principles. After the Partition of Bengal in 1947, Kashgari moved to Dacca, East Bengal. He began teaching at the Dhaka Alia Madrasa where he also served as a hostel superintendent. In 1955, he was promoted to assistant head mawlana of the institution, and became the head mawlana (principal) from 1969 until his death. Among his students were Prime Minister Sher-e-Bangla Abul Kasem Fazlul Huq, Muhammad Fakhruddin (bn), Muhiuddin Khan, Nurul Islam Hashemi (bn), Syed Fazlur Rahman and Abu Mahfuz Al-Karim Masumi. In 1963, he was appointed as the first khatib of the newly built Baitul Mukarram National Mosque and he served in this position until the end of his life. Kashgari was also a member of the Anjuman Mufidul Islam organisation.

== Works ==
Kashgari has written many works pertaining to Arabic language and has also composed Islamic poetry in Arabic. Among his books are:

- Dīwān az-Zahrāt (Lucknow, 1935)
- Al-Ḥadīqah (Incorporated into the dakhil grade curriculum for Alia madrasahs by the Madrasah Education Board)
- Al-Mufīd liman yastafīd (Dhaka, 1961; a two-volume trilingual dictionary of Arabic, Bengali and Urdu)
- Al-Miḥbar fi al-Mudhakkar wa al-Muannath
- Amthāl al-Lughatayn (Comparison of Arabic and Urdu proverbs)
- Maḥak an-Naqd (a commentary on Qudama ibn Ja'far's Naqd ash-Shiʿr)
- Commentary on Sher Ibn Muqbil al-ʿAdlānī
- Commentary on Niẓām al-Lasad fī Asmāʾ al-Asad by Al-Suyuti
- Extractions from Asmāʾ al-Asad and Asmāʾ adh-Dhiʾb by Radi ad-Din Hasan as-Saghani
- Dīwān al-ʿIbrāt (unpublished poetry)
- Dīwān ash-Shadhrāt (unpublished poetry)
- Farhang-e-Kāshgarī (unpublished poetry)

== Personal life ==
Kashgarhi remained a bachelor for his entire life. He had pet kittens.

== Death ==
Kashgarhi died 3rd April 1971, in Dacca, East Pakistan (present-day Bangladesh). He was buried in Azimpur Graveyard. One of his students, Abu Mahfuz Al-Karim Masumi, wrote a lengthy obituary for the fortnightly Al-Raid in Lucknow.
