= Khalilur Rahman Saharanpuri =

Khalilur Rahman Saharanpuri was an Indian Islamic scholar of the Deobandi movement who served as the chancellor of Darul Uloom Nadwatul Ulama from 1905 until 1915. He was secretary general of the same institution, succeeding Masihuzzaman Khan.

== Early life ==
Saharanpuri was born in Saharanpur in the Indian state of Uttar Pradesh. His father was Ahmad Ali Saharanpuri, a teacher of Mahmud Hasan Deobandi. Saharanpuri received his early education from Mazahir Uloom, studying hadith with his father.

== Career ==
After his father's death in 1879, he worked as a timber merchant.

Beginning in 1893, Saharanpuri was involved in the establishment of Nadwatul Ulama, which aimed to reform the Islamic educational system and better address challenges of the British Raj.

Saharanpuri took part in this movement with fellow Indian Muslim Deobandi scholars such as Shibli Nomani, and Altaf Hussein Hali.

The University Darul Uloom Nadwatul Ulama in Lucknow was founded by the Nadwatul Ulama council in 1898; Saharanpuri served as its chancellor from 1905 to 1915 and Secretary General, succeeding Masihuzzaman Khan.

== Views ==
Saharanpuri opposed teaching English to Indian Muslims as well as British-style education and culture. He was a supporter of the Khilafat movement in the Indian Subcontinent.

== Death and legacy ==
Saharanpuri died on 4 February 1936. His sons Aqilur Rahman Khan Nadvi and Manzurun Nabi also became scholars.
