= Al-Qadeer Higher Secondary School, Sambhal =

Location
- Sambhal, Uttar Pradesh; India
- Coordinates: 28.574764°N 78.589327°E

Information
- Type: Government recognised Un-aided School
- Motto: Hum Daure Jihalat Ko Dunia Se Mita Denge, Ye Aag Hai Taleemi Har Dil Me Laga Denge (We will remove the era of ignorance from this world, This is an educational 'fire', we will kindle it in every heart)
- Established: 1 July 1997
- Founder: Haji Abdul Qadeer
- School district: Sambhal
- Superintendent: Kausar Husain (Secretary)
- Principal: Shan Miyan, M.A. B.Ed.
- Faculty: 40
- Grades: Secondary School
- Enrolment: 1500
- Campus type: Co-Educational
- Color
- Newspaper: Amar Ujala Dainik Jagran The Hindu Jansatta
- Website: www.alqadeer.in

Al-Qadeer Higher Secondary School is a school in Sambhal, Uttar Pradesh, India. It is run by a Non-Government Organisation (NGO) named Qadeer-Ul-Uloom.

== History ==
Qadeer-ul-Uloom is a registered NGO in Mandi Kishan Das Sarai, Sambhal. Founded in 1992 by social activist Haji Abdul Qadeer (Late), the NGO was registered with Registrar of Societies in 1996. Other institutions run by Qadeer-ul-Ulomm includes Al-Qadeer Public School, Al-Qadeer Junior High School and Madarsa Ahle-Sunnat Qadeer-ul-Uloom Husainiya Ashrafiya

== Minority institution ==
Al-Qadeer Higher Secondary School is a Minority Educational Institution as declared by the National Commission for Minority Educational Institutions, Government of India and is granted under Section 2(g) of National Commission for Minority Educational Institutions Act-2004.

== See also ==
- Education in Sambhal
- Maulana Azad Education Foundation
- Government Degree College Sambhal
- Sambhal
