= Muhammad Ali Mungeri =

Indian Muslim scholar

Muḥammad Ali Mungeri

First Chancellor of Darul Uloom Nadwatul Ulama
- In office 26 September 1898 – 19 July 1903
- Preceded by: Position established
- Succeeded by: Masihuzzaman Khan

Personal life
- Born: 28 July 1846 Kanpur, Mughal India
- Died: 13 September 1927 (aged 81)
- Children: Minnatullah Rahmani (son)
- Notable work(s): Ā'īna-e-Islām, Sāti' al-Burhān, Barāhīn-e-Qāti'ah, Faisla Āsmāni, Shahādat-e-Āsmāni
- Education: Mazahir Uloom
- Relatives: Wali Rahmani (grandson)

Religious life
- Religion: Islam
- Founder of: Nadwatul Ulama; Darul Uloom Nadwatul Ulama

Muḥammad Ali Mungeri (28 July 1846 – 13 September 1927) was an Indian Muslim scholar who was the founder Nadwatul Ulama and first chancellor of its Darul Uloom, a major Islamic seminary in Lucknow. He extensively wrote against Christianity and Ahmadiyya. His books include Ā'īna-e-Islām, Sāti' al-Burhān, Barāhīn-e-Qāti'ah, Faisla Āsmāni and Shahādat-e-Āsmāni.

Muḥammad Ali was a student of Ahmad Ali Saharanpuri and an authorized disciple of Fazl Raḥmān Ganj Murādābādi. He resigned from the Nadwatul Ulama in 1903 and shifted to Munger where he established the Khānqah Raḥmāniya. His son Minnatullah Rahmani was among the founders of the All India Muslim Personal Law Board and his grandson Wali Rahmani established the institution of Rahmani30.

== Early life and education ==
Muḥammad Ali Mungeri was born on 28 July 1846 in Kanpur. His ism (given name) was Muḥammad Ali. His nasab (patronymic) is: Muḥammad Ali ibn Abd al-Ali ibn Ghaws Ali ibn Rāhat Ali ibn Amān Ali ibn Nūr Muḥammad ibn Muḥammad Umar ibn Āshiq Muḥammad ibn Muḥammad Shah ibn Atīqullah ibn Qutbuddīn ibn Makhdūm Abu Bakr ibn Bahā al-Haqq Habībullah Multāni ibn Ḥasan ibn Yūsuf ibn Jamāl al-Haqq ibn Ibrāhim ibn Rāji Ḥāmid ibn Mūsa Aḥmad Shibli ibn Ali ibn Muḥammad ibn Ḥasan ibn Abu Saleh ibn Abd al-Razzāq ibn Abdul Qadir Jilani.

Muḥammad Ali studied the Quran with his uncle Zahoor Ali and the primary books of Persian with Abd al-Wāhid Balgrāmi. He was among the early students of the Madrasa Faiz-e-Aam in Kanpur. He studied there with Ināyat Aḥmad Kākori, Sayyid Ḥussain Shah and Lutfullah Aligarhi; however left his studies incomplete as his mother insisted him to marry. Aged 22, Muḥammad Ali was married in Mohiuddinpur, where he stayed for two years. Meanwhile his teacher Lutfullah Aligarhi had moved to Aligarh where he continued his teaching circle at the Madrasa Jāmi' Masjid. Muḥammad Ali shifted to Aligarh and completed his remaining course with Lutfullah Aligarhi. He completed studying rational sciences with Lutfullah and then studied the Sihah Sittah with him. He went to Mazahir Uloom in 1293 AH where he stayed with Ahmad Ali Saharanpuri for nine months and studied the Sihah Sittah, Muwatta Imam Muḥammad and Muwatta Imam Malik with him. Muḥammad Ali was an authorized disciple of Shah Fazl-e-Rahman Ganj Muradabadi in Sufism.

== Career ==
Muḥammad Ali started to teach in Dulāri Masjid in Kanpur. Impressed by his teaching method, he was invited by the rector of Madrasa Faiz-e-Aam to teach there. Muḥammad Ali taught there for few months but then fell ill and discontinued teaching. Earlier he had taught at this madrasa for about two years before travelling to Saharanpur, where he studied with Ahmad Ali Saharanpuri.

In 1893, during the annual congregation of the Madrasa Faiz-e-Aam, a group of scholars unanimously decided that a permanent council of scholars be formed and its meeting be in the next year. They named the council as Nadwatul Ulama and Muḥammad Ali was appointed as its first manager. According to Habībur Raḥmān Khān Sherwāni, Muḥammad Ali was the first person who thought of establishing the institution of Nadwa. In Muharram 1313 AH, he presented his sketch of the Darul Uloom, and five months later, he presented the draft of its educational curriculum, named Musawwada-e Nisāb-e-Arabi. His sketch of the Darul Uloom was unanimously accepted in April 1896 in the meet of the Nadwatul Ulama at Bareily. He is thus referred as the prime founder of the Nadwatul Ulama and its Darul Uloom Nadwatul Ulama, one of the major Islamic seminaries in India. He applied for resignation in Rajab 1313 AH, however it was not approved, and Hakīm Abdul Hai Hasani was appointed as his helper. His resignation was approved on 19 July 1903. He then shifted permanently to Munger.

In 1901, Muḥammad Ali established the Khanqah Rahmāniya in Munger. He gave religious and spiritual discourses there. His murids (pupils) in Sufism count about four hundred thousand. He wrote a short treatise on Sufism, entitled Irshād-e-Raḥmāni.

Muḥammad Ali started a newspaper Manshūr-e-Muḥammadi in 1289 AH to curb the spread of Christianity among Indian Muslims. The literature of Christian missionaries Munshi Safdar Ali and Imāduddīn was getting quite famous in that time. Through Manshūr-e-Muḥammadi, Muḥammad Ali wrote in defense of Islam and invited Christian missionaries to debate, who did not reply, and it helped the Muslims with weak faith, to stay upon the religion of Islam. The newspaper stopped after five years as Muḥammad Ali had gone to complete his hadith studies with Ahmad Ali Saharanpuri. Muḥammad Ali also established the Islamic Orphanage Center in Kanpur to help poor Muslim kids so that they did not fall to Christianity. The center taught the Muslims kids the skills of craftsmanship, besides education.

== Literary works ==
=== On Christianity ===
Muḥammad Ali authored Mirat al-Yaqīn criticising Christianity. In this book, he defended Rahmatullah Kairanawi's Ae'jāz-e-Īswi, which Imāduddīn had tried to criticize through Hidāyat al-Muslimīn. In Mirat al-Yaqīn, Muḥammad Ali claimed that the Christian scholars accept that the Bible has been distorted, and whatever Kairanwi had written was right.

In 1297 AH, Muḥammad Ali wrote Ā'īna-e-Islām as a response to Safdar Ali's Nayā Zamāna. He wrote Tarāna-e-Hijāzi in 1295 AH and Daf'a at-Talbisāt in 1302 AH. He later wrote Sāti' al-Burhān and Barāhīn-e-Qāti'ah. He also authored Paighām-e-Muḥammadi, as a response to Safdar Ali's Nayā Zamāna and Adm Zarūrat-e-Qur'ān of Thakur Das. The book is spread over two volumes and is considered Muḥammad Ali's major work.

=== On Ahmadiyya ===
Muḥammad Ali was among the prominent Muslim scholars who debated with the Ahmadis. He authored more than one hundred books and articles against them. He wrote Faisla Āsmāni in three volumes. His other books on this include Shahādat-e-Āsmāni, Chashma-e-Hidāyat, Me'yār-e-Sadāqat, Haqīqat al-Masīh and Tanziyah Rabbāni.

== Death and legacy ==
Muḥammad Ali died on 13 September 1927. His son Minnatullah Rahmani was among the founding figures of the All India Muslim Personal Law Board. His grandson Wali Rahmani founded the Rahmani30 institute.
