= Ijteba Nadwi =

Indian Muslim scholar

Mawlānā Muḥammad Ijteba Nadwi
- Born: 29 September 1933; Majhawwa Meer, Basti, British India
- Died: 20 June 2008 (aged 74); New Delhi
- Awards: Presidential Certificate of Honor, 1991

Academic background
- Education: Darul Uloom Nadwatul Ulama; Damascus University; Aligarh Muslim University

Academic work
- Discipline: Arabic Language and Literature
- Institutions: Jamia Millia Islamia, Kashmir University, Allahabad University
- Notable works: Abul Hasan Ali Nadwi: al-Daaiya al-Hakeem wa al-murabbi al-Jaleel, Tārīkh Fikr-e-Islāmi

Personal life
- Resting place: Jamia Millia Islamia cemetery

Religious life
- Religion: Islam

Muḥammad Ijteba Nadwi (29 September 1933 – 20 June 2008) was an Indian Islamic scholar, who formerly headed the Arabic departments of Jamia Millia Islamia, Kashmir University and the Allahabad University.

Nadwi was an alumnus of Darul Uloom Nadwatul Ulama, Damascus University and the Aligarh Muslim University. He was an author of Arabic and Urdu and authored books such as Abul Hasan Ali Nadwi: al-Daaiya al-Hakeem wa al-murabbi al-Jaleel and Islam aur Huquq-e-Insani.

== Early life and education ==
Ijteba Nadwi's grandfather Sayyid Jafar Ali was a disciple of Sayyid Ahmad Shaheed. He had participated in the Battle of Balakot in 1831 and later relocated to Basti, Uttar Pradesh.

Nadwi was born on 29 September 1933 in Majhawwa Meer, a village located in the Basti district. He began studying at the Darul Uloom Nadwatul Ulama and graduated in the traditional "dars-e-nizami" in 1955.He received a B.A degree in Arabic literature from the Damascus University in 1960, and an M.A (1964) and a PhD (1976) from the Aligarh Muslim University. His teachers included Mustafa al-Siba'i, Hasan Habanaka, Ali al-Tantawi, Abul Hasan Ali Nadwi and Rabey Hasani Nadwi.

== Career ==
Nadwi was appointed as a teacher of Arabic language, literature and Islamic jurisprudence at the Darul Uloom Nadwatul Ulama in 1960. In 1965, he joined the then Department of Arabic, Iranian and Islamic Studies (Note: According to the official website of Jamia Millia Islamia, these departments were trifurcated to "The Department of Arabic", "The Department of Islamic Studies" and "The Department of Persian" in 1988.) of Jamia Millia Islamia as a faculty member and later became an associate professor and then the head professor.

In 1979, Nadwi was appointed as an associate professor at the Imam Muhammad ibn Saud Islamic University. He taught at the Islamic University of Madinah until 1987 and returned to India in 1987. He served as the rector of Jamiat ul-Hidaya in Jaipur for a short while before joining the Arabic department of University of Kashmir as Head professor in 1988. He later became the Head professor in the Arabic department of the University of Allahabad in March 1990, from where he retired on 30 June 1994.

Nadwi was among the founding members of World League of Islamic Literature (Rābtah Adab-e-Islāmi) and served as the president of its branch in India. He was also a member of the executive council of Nadwatul Ulama. Aiming to aid in research and translation of Arabic language, literature and Islamic teachings, he founded "Markaz Ilmi" in New Delhi. He received the Certificate of Honor from the President of India in 1991.

== Literary works ==
Nadwi wrote books including al-Ameer Syed Siddiq Hasan Khan: Hayatuhu wa Aasaruhu (transl. Life and works of Siddiq Hasan Khan), Abul Hasan Ali Nadwi: al-Daaiya al-Hakeem wa al-murabbi al-Jaleel (transl. Life and works of Abul Hasan Ali Nadwi), al-Imam Ahmad ibn Abdul Rahim: al-maroof bih al-Shah WaliUllah al-Dehlawi (transl. Biography of Shah Waliullah Dehlawi), Al-Tabeer wal Muhadatha, Aurat Islam Ki Nazar Mai (transl. Woman: Islamic perspective), Islam aur Huquq-e-Insani (transl. Islam and human rights), Nuqush-e-Tabinda and Tarikh Fikr-e-Islami.

== Death and legacy ==
Nadwi died on 20 June 2008 in New Delhi, after having a heart surgery. He was buried in the Jamia Millia Islamia cemetery. Muhammad Idrees wrote Contribution of Dr Muhammad Ijteba Nadwi to Arabic Literature Qasim Adil wrote Dr. Ijteba Nadwi: A Great Scholar of 20th Century in India.
