= Sambhal =

- City
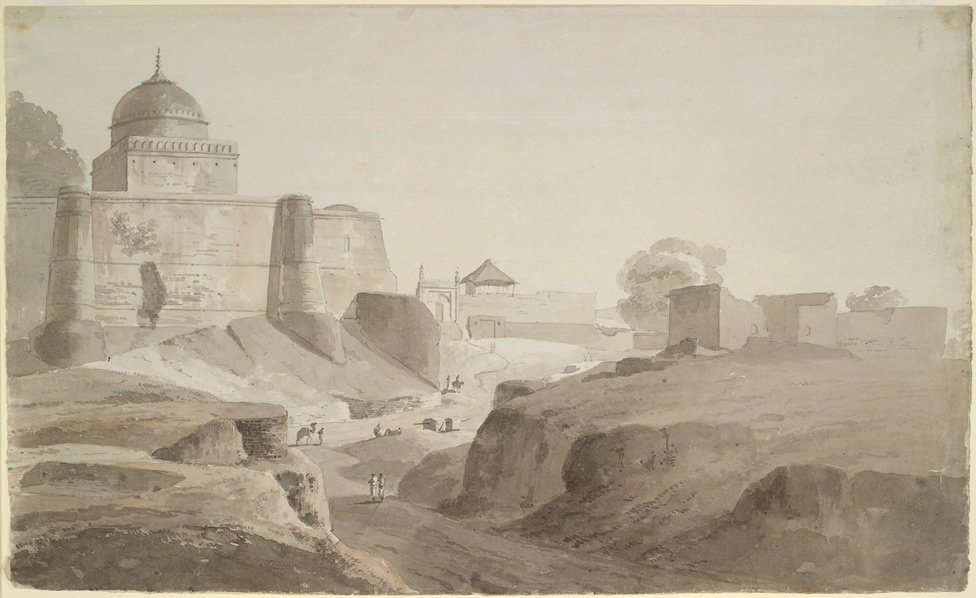
- Shahi Jama Masjid

- Location in Uttar Pradesh, India Sambhal (India)
- Coordinates: 28.58°N 78.55°E
- Country: India
- State: Uttar Pradesh
- Division: Moradabad
- District: Sambhal
- Established: 12th Century AD

Government
  - MP: Saksham Gupta (SP)
  - MLA: Shoaib Tikona (SP)
  - Chairman: Golu dudhiye (AIMIM)

Area
  - Total: 16 km^{2} (6.2 sq mi)
- Elevation: 203 m (666 ft)

Population (2011)
  - Total: 220,813
  - Density: 11,433/km^{2} (29,610/sq mi)
- Demonym: Sambhali

Language
  - Official: Hindi
  - Additional official: Urdu
- Time zone: UTC+5:30 (IST)
- PIN: 244302
- Postal code: 244303
- Telephone code: (+91) (05923)
- Vehicle registration: UP-38
- Website: sambhal.nic.in

Sambhal (pronounced sə̃bʰəl) is a city located in the Sambhal district of Uttar Pradesh, India. The city lies approximately 158 km (98 mi) east of the national capital New Delhi and 355 km (220 mi) north-west of the state capital Lucknow. It also falls within the Rohilkhand region in the Moradabad division of the state, being approximately 32 km (20 miles) from the city of Moradabad.

== History ==
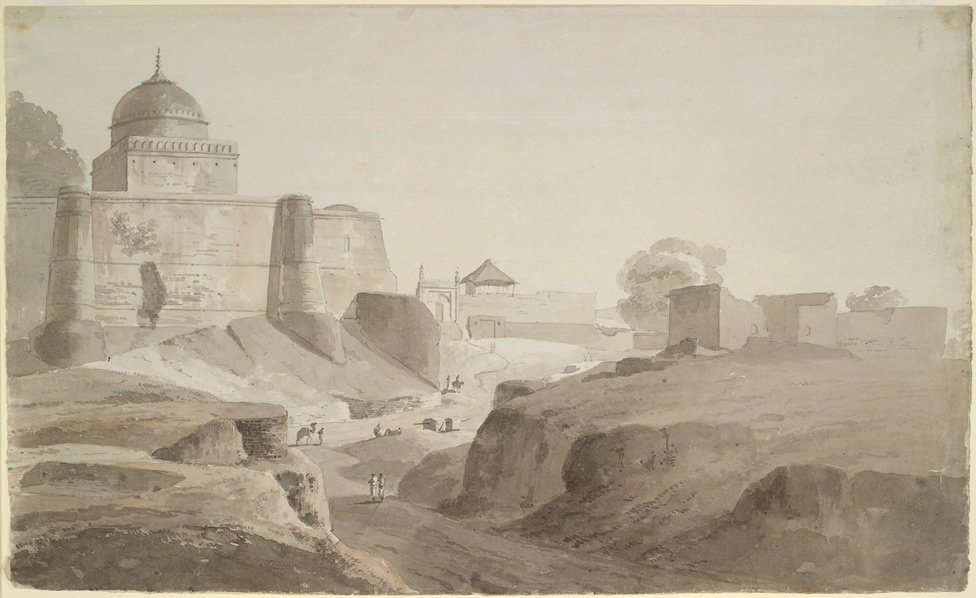
Shahi Jama Masjid at Sambhal in Uttar Pradesh (1789). Pencil and wash drawing. British Library, London

Sambhal is identified as Shambhala, a village which is mentioned as the birthplace of Kalki, the tenth and last incarnation of Vishnu, in the Mahabharata and the Hindu Puranas such as the Skanda Purana, Bhavishya Purana and later Kalki Purana (the city is also home to a "Shri Kalki Vishnu Mandir"). This was borrowed into the Buddhist mythology of Tibetan Buddhism where it is described as a mythological kingdom and a pure land beyond the Himalayas from where the future Maitreya will emerge. According to Ibn Battuta, Toghon Temür the last Yuan dynasty emperor of China had sent an embassy to the Sultan of Delhi Muhammad bin Tughluq, requesting permission to rebuild a Buddhist temple at Sambhal, which at the time attracted pilgrims from Tibet.

Sambhal has been an urban center for hundreds of years and was a prominent town during the medieval period. Two legendary battles between Prithviraj Chauhan and Ghazi Saiyyad Salar Masud are claimed to have taken place here. At the time under local rulers, in the 13th and 14th-centuries it would go on to become a part of the Delhi Sultanate, first under Qutb ud-Din Aibak and later under Firuz Shah Tughlaq.

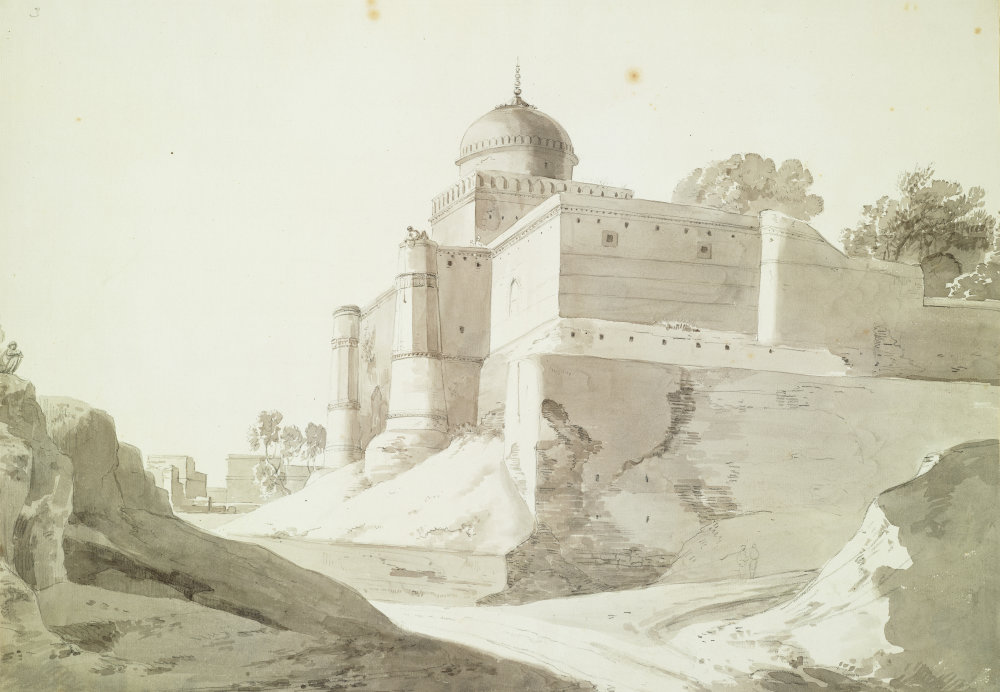
Pencil & wash drawing of the Shahi Jama Masjid at Sambhal, by Thomas Daniell and William Daniell, 24 March 1789.

Later it was a capital of the Lodi dynasty of the Delhi Sultanate under Sikandar Lodi for four years in the 15th-century. A folio from the Baburnama, depicts an award ceremony in Sultan Ibrahim Lodi's court before an expedition to Sambhal in the early 16th-century. After the collapse of the Delhi Sultanate, the city fell to the Mughals under Babur, briefly serving as the capital of the new empire. Babur is also claimed to have built a mosque here which is still extant. The city would later be governed by his son Humayun. After the death of Babur, his domain was divided among his sons, consequently Sambhal was given to Askari Mirza. Sambhal flourished under the rule of Akbar, Humayun's son, but subsequently deteriorated in popularity when Akbar's grandson Shah Jahan was put in charge of the city, and the local (sarkar) capital was shifted to Moradabad.

=== Sambhal district ===
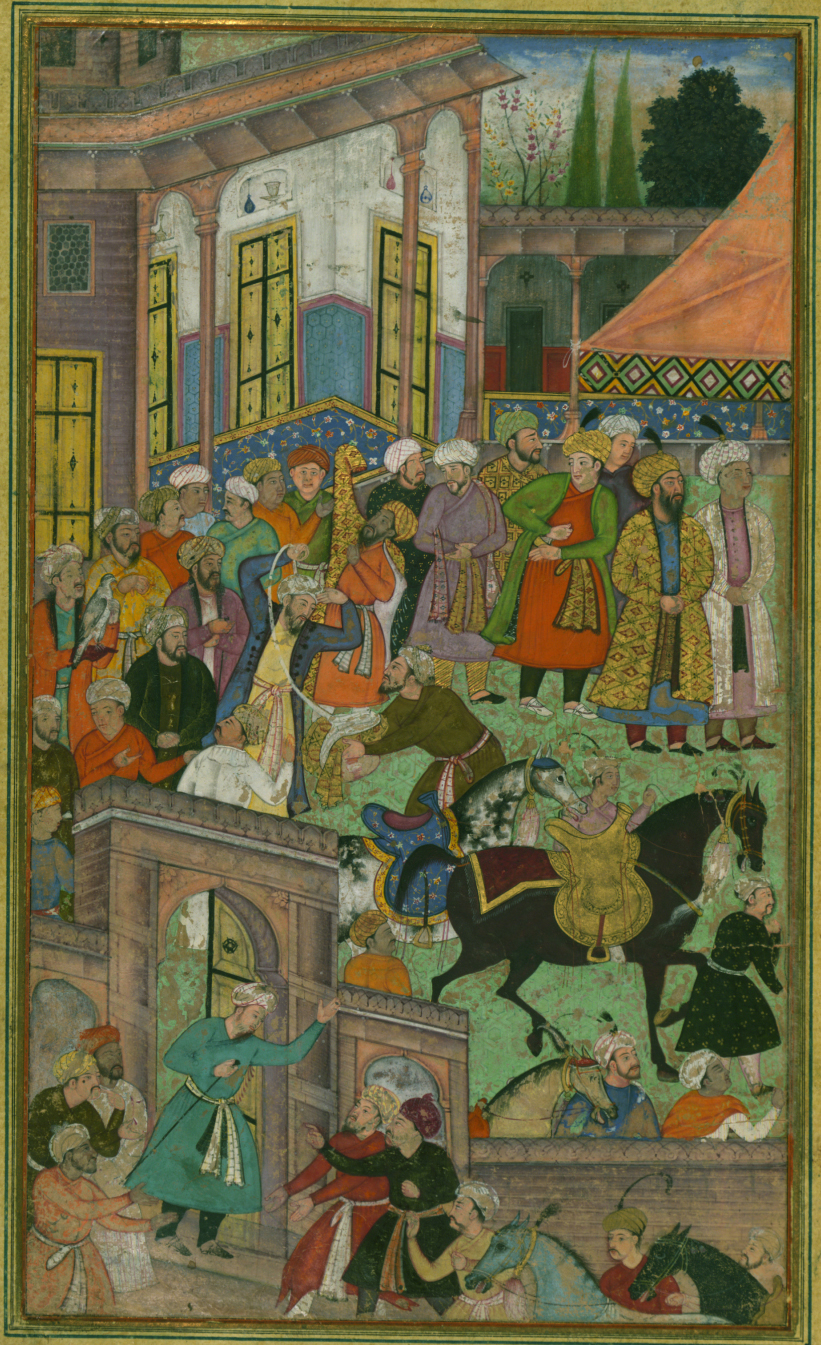
A folio from the Baburnama: An awards ceremony in Sultan Ibrāhīm Lodi's court before an expedition to Sambhal in the early 16th century.

The district was announced on 28 September 2011 and created by the state government out of Moradabad district on 23 July 2012 as one of three new districts in the state. At the time of its creation, the state government decided to name the new district "Bhimnagar" in honour of the social reformer, Bhimrao Ambedkar. However, massive protests broke out in Sambhal town and the adjoining rural areas against the move to rename to the ancient town. Sambhal had been known by the same name for over 500 years, had been an important town in medieval India, and had never had any connection with Bhimrao Ambedkar, a Dalit icon. The protests were successful and the government retained the name of Sambhal.

== Demographics ==
As per provisional reports of the 2011 Census of India, the population of Sambhal city in 2011 was 221,334, of which 116,008 were male and 105,326 were female. The amount of total literates in Sambhal consist of 92,608 people, of which 51,382 are males while 41,226 are females. The average literacy rate in Sambhal city is 49.51%, of which male literacy was 52.27 percent, while female literacy being 46.45%. The sex ratio of Sambhal city is 908 females per 1,000 males and the child sex ratio of girls is 936 per 1,000 boys. The amount of total children (0-6) in Sambhal city constitute 34,279 as per the records of Census India 2011. There were 17,702 boys and 16,577 girls. The children form 15.49% of the total population

Religions in Sambhal (2011)
Religion	Percent
Islam	77.67%
Hinduism	22.00%
Other or not stated	0.31%
Distribution of religions

Sambhal is a Muslim-majority city in India with approximately 77.67% of the city's population following Islam as their religion. Hinduism is the second most common religion in the city of Sambhal with approximately 22.00% following it, followed by Christianity (0.12%), Sikhism (0.06%), Buddhism (0.03%), and Jainism (0.02%).

Languages in Sambhal town (2011)
1. Urdu (70.8%)
2. Hindi (29.2%)
3. Others (0.05%)

As of the 2011 census, 70.75% of the population recorded their language as Urdu and 29.20% as Hindi.

== Economy ==
Sambhal has the largest market of menthol in South Asia. Most of menthol oil is exported to Western Europe and China.

== Education ==
Sambhal has many schools and Inter colleges for primary and secondary level education affiliated with CBSE, ICSE, the UP Board, and the Madarsa Board.

=== Degree Colleges ===
- Mahatma Gandhi Memorial Post Graduate College
- Government Degree College Sambhal

=== UP Board ===
- Al-Qadeer Higher Secondary School, Sambhal
- Hind Inter College Sambhal
- M.N.I. Higher secondary Hatim Sarai SAMBHAL

== See also ==
- Shambhala
- Sambhal (Assembly constituency)
- Tirtha Prabandha, written by Shri Vadiraja Tirtha
- Sambhali Trust
- Abdul Khaliq Sambhali, Indian Islamic scholar and writer
- Burhanuddin Sambhali, Indian Islamic scholar, teacher and jurist
- Ishaq Sambhali, Indian politician, freedom activist and journalist
