= Saeed-ur-Rahman Azmi Nadvi =

Indian Islamic scholar (1934–2026)

Saeedur Rahman Al-Azmi Nadwi

10th Principal of Darul Uloom Nadwatul Ulama
- In office 2000–2026
- Preceded by: Rabey Hasani Nadwi
- Succeeded by: Abdul Aziz Khalifa Bhatkali Nadwi

Personal details
- Born: 14 May 1934 Mau, United Provinces of Agra and Oudh, British India
- Died: 7 October 2026 (aged 92) Lucknow, Uttar Pradesh, India
- Education: Darul Uloom Nadwatul Ulama, Al-Azhar University
- Awards: The Lifetime Award

Personal life

Religious life
- Religion: Islam

Saeed-ur-Rahman Azmi Nadwi (14 May 1934 – 7 October 2026) was an Indian Islamic scholar who served as the principal of Darul Uloom Nadwatul Ulama. He was the editor of Al-Baas El-Islami.

== Biography ==
Nadvi served as the principal of Darul Uloom Nadwatul Ulamaand as the editor-in-chief of Al-Baas El-Islami.. He was the first chancellor as well as the co-founder of Integral University. He was also a senior member of the All India Muslim Personal Law Board.

On 15 February 2013, he was conferred with The Lifetime Award by the Institute of Objective Studies, New Delhi.

He received an honorary degree of D Litt from Khwaja Moinuddin Chishti Language University on 21 November 2019.

Nadvi died in Lucknow on 7 October 2026, at the age of 92. He was buried in the Daliganj Qabristan.

== Literary works ==
- اسلام اور مغرب - Islam aur Maghrib (2012)

== Arabic Publications of Maulana Dr. Saeed-ur-Rahman Azmi Nadwi ==
=== Original Arabic Works ===
1. خطب أيام الجمعة في ضوء الكتاب والسنة (Friday Sermons in Light of the Qur'an and Sunnah)
2. الدعوة الإسلامية: منجزات – مشكلات – طرق المعالجة (Islamic Da'wah: Achievements, Problems, and Solutions)
3. ساعة مع العارفين (طبعة دار المقطم) (An Hour with the Knowers – Dar al-Muqattam edition)
4. سورة يوسف: دروس وعبر (Surah Yusuf: Lessons and Admonitions)
5. الصحافة العربية: نشأتها وتطورها (Arabic Journalism: Its Origin and Development)
6. الأدب والإسلام: وأعلام الأدب الإسلامي (Literature and Islam: Figures of Islamic Literature)
7. محاضرات في فن التدريس (طبعة مكتبة الفردوس) (Lectures on the Art of Teaching – Maktaba al-Firdous edition)
8. المدارس والجامعات (Schools and Universities)
9. شعراء الرسول ﷺ في ضوء الواقع والفرض (The Poets of the Prophet ﷺ)
10. ساعة مع العارفين – الجزء الثاني (An Hour with the Knowers – Part Two)
11. صور من واقع الدين (Glimpses of the Reality of Religion)
12. الإسلام ودعائم اليقظة الإسلامية (Islam and the Foundations of Islamic Awakening)
13. لقاءات ومشاهدات: في رحلة علمية للدول العربية (Meetings and Observations: An Academic Journey to Arab Countries)
14. ندوة العلماء: حركتها – دعوتها – أبعادها (Nadwatul Ulama: Its Movement, Mission, and Dimensions)
15. دور ندوة العلماء في تطوير الصحافة العربية في الهند (Nadwatul Ulama's Role in Developing Arabic Journalism in India)
16. أحمد بن عرفان الإمام المجاهد الشهيد (Ahmad ibn Irfan, the Martyred Mujahid Imam)
17. ساعة مع العارفين – الجزء الأول (طبعة مكتبة الفردوس) (An Hour with the Knowers – Part One, Maktaba al-Firdous edition)
18. القرآن يتحدث إليكم – تعريب الشيخ سعيد الأعظمي الندوي (The Qur'an Speaks to You – Arabization by Sheikh Saeed al-A'zami Nadwi)
19. محاضرات في فن التدريس (طبعة دار القلم – دمشق) (Lectures on the Art of Teaching – Dar al-Qalam, Damascus edition)

=== Annotations on Books ===
1. المنتخبات العربية – by Sheikh Mahboob Rahman al-Azhari & Sheikh Abul Mahfouz al-Karim al-Ma'sumi
2. مجموعة من النظم – by Sheikh Sharif Salim al-Misri
3. البلاغة الواضحة (القرآنية) – by Ali al-Jarim & Mustafa Amin
4. المختار من وفيات الأعيان – by Ibn Khallikan
5. باب المراثي من ديوان الحماسة – by Abu Tammam

=== Translated Works ===
1. جزيرة العرب – Sheikh Muhammad al-Rabi' al-Hasani Nadwi
2. الهداية القرآنية سفينة نجاة للإنسانية – Sheikh Muhammad al-Rabi' al-Hasani Nadwi
3. فضائل الأعمال: دراسة علمية – Sheikh al-Makki
4. مسئولية العلماء في الأوضاع المتغيرة – Sheikh Abul Hasan Ali al-Hasani Nadwi
5. خطر للبلاد الكبير – Sheikh Abul Hasan Ali al-Hasani Nadwi
6. العلامة شبلي النعماني – Professor Ejaz Naumani
7. سورة الحجرات حدوده وآدابه – Sheikh Muhammad al-Rabi' al-Hasani Nadwi
8. الرسالة وحاجة الإنسانية إليها – Sheikh Abul Hasan Ali al-Hasani Nadwi
9. الحج: فضائله وآدابه ومشاعره – Sheikh Muhammad al-Rabi' al-Hasani Nadwi
10. العلامة عبد الحي الفرنكي محلي: حياته وآثاره – Sheikh Tariq Rashid Firangi Mahali
11. علماء فرنكي محل البارزون وخدماتهم الدينية – Sheikh Khalid Rashid Firangi Mahali
12. تأملات في سورة الشعراء – Allama Nadwi
13. الصراع بين الحق والباطل في ضوء سورة الكهف – Sheikh Muhammad al-Rabi' Nadwi
14. أعلام من العرب والعجم – Sheikh Muhammad al-Rabi' al-Hasani Nadwi

== Bibliography ==
- Daisy, Ahmed (2015). DEVELOPMENT OF INDO-ARABIC LITERATURE AND THE CONTRIBUTION OF DR. SAYEEDUR RAHMAN AL-A'ZMI ALNADWI TO AL-BAAS AL-ISLAMI. Department of Arabic, Gauhati University (Thesis).
- Saeed Al Azmi Al Nadwi and his contribution to the development of Arabic language and literature, PhD
- P, Jubailiya (2020). Darul Uloom Nadwathul Ulama its Contributions to the Development of Arabic Language and Literature: an analytical study (PhD thesis) (in Arabic). India: Department of Arabic, University of Calicut. pp. 184–186. hdl:10603/306944. Archived from the original on 26 November 2023.
- Rahman, Obaidur (2017). Musahamatu Darul Uloom Nadwatul Ulama Fi Nashril Lughatil Arabiati Wal Adabil Islami Wa Dauruha Fi Majalis Sahafati Wal Elam (PhD thesis) (in Arabic). India: University of Calcutta. pp. 277–280. hdl:10603/314806. Archived from the original on 16 June 2023.
