= Sajjad Nomani =

Indian Muslim scholar

Maulana Shaykh Khalil-ur-Rahman Sajjad Nomani دامت برکاتہم عالیہ Dāmat Barkatuhum 'Āliyah حفظہ اللہ
- سجاد نعمانی
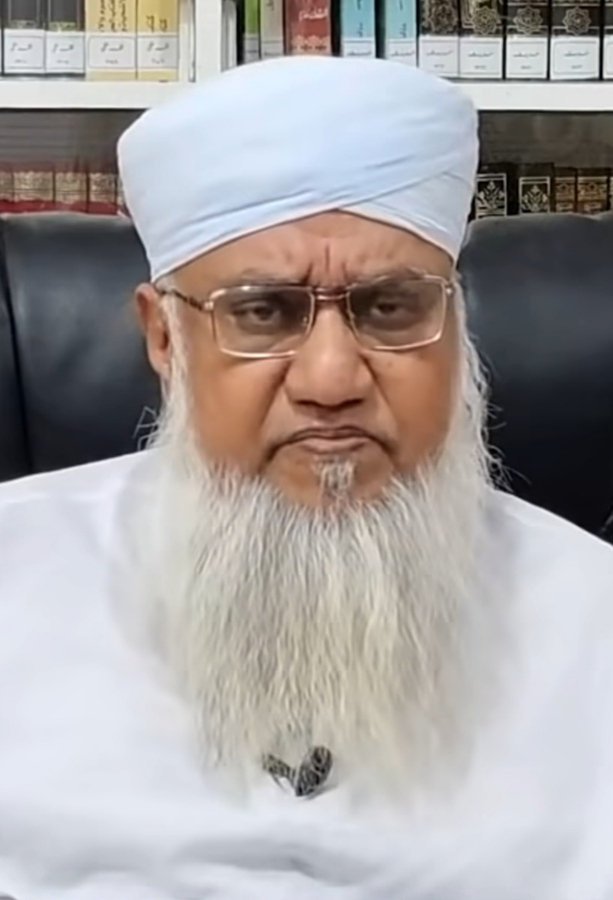

Personal life
- Born: c. 12 August 1955 Lucknow, Uttar Pradesh, India
- Home town: Lucknow
- Parent: Manzur Nu'mani
- Dynasty: Nu'manī
- Main interest(s): Hadith studies, Polemics, Education
- Notable work: Alfurqan
- Education: Darul Uloom Nadwatul Ulama, Darul Uloom Deoband, Islamic University of Madinah
- Occupation: Islamic scholar, writer, Educationist
- Relatives: Late Ateeq Ur Rehman Sambhali(brother)

Religious life
- Religion: Islam
- Denomination: Sunni Islam
- Jurisprudence: Hanafi
- Tariqa: Chishti, Suharwardi, Qadri Naqshabandi Mujaddidi Golden Order
- Movement: Deobandi

Muslim leader
- Teacher: Zulfiqar Ahmad Naqshbandi. (Naqshabandi Mujaddidi Order)
- Position: Founder
- Organization: Rahman Foundation, Khanqah-e-Numaniyyah
- Dynasty: Nu'manī

Khalil-ur-Rahman Sajjad Nomani (or only Sajjad Nomani) (born 12 August 1955) is an Indian Islamic scholar, spokesperson of All India Muslim Personal Law Board, educator and author of many Islamic books. He is an alumnus of Darul Uloom Nadwatul Ulama, Darul Uloom Deoband, and Islamic University of Madinah. With BAMCEF and Waman Meshram, Nomani initiated various activism initiatives, primarily for right of minorities of India. He is the founder of Rahman Foundation, a Non-governmental Organisation based in Lucknow, Uttar Pradesh. He has been declared as one of the 100 most influential Muslims by Muslim Mirror.

== Early life ==
Nomani was born in year 1955 in Lucknow, India. His father Manzur Nu'mani was also a prominent Islamic scholar, theologian, journalist, writer, and social activist. His grandfather Sufi Muhammad Husain, was a businessman and landlord.

Nomani received his education in his hometown, graduating from Darul Uloom Nadwatul Ulama and Darul Uloom Deoband. Later he studied at the Islamic University of Madinah and completed a doctorate in Quranic Studies.

Nomani is a sheikh, scholar and teacher of the Naqshbandi order, a major Sunni spiritual order of Sufism. He is a disciple of Zulfiqar Ahmad Naqshbandi.

== Activism ==
All India Muslim Personal Law Board launched a movement to safeguard constitutional rights and faith of religious minorities titled "Deen aur Dastur Bachao" (Save Religion-Save Constitution) campaign. This campaign was led by Nomani, who travelled throughout the country to create awareness. He also called for joined initiative with the government, law enforcing agencies, religious scholars and media to prevent Indian Youth from getting attracted to terror outfits.

Nomani ran a campaign with BAMCEF and scholars of different religions like Christians, Sikhs, Lingayats (Karnataka) and several tribal communities to campaign against Uniform Civil Code.

Nomani also took part in the Citizenship Amendment Act Protests and called for a Bharat Bandh to protest the controversial law.

During 2024 general elections in India, Sajjad Nomani wrote letter to Rahul Gandhi, appraising his efforts to protect Indian constitution. In the letter, he expressed concerned of Rahul not addressing community as "muslims". He assured that community expects equal consideration in the nation building activities.

During 2024 Maharashtra Legislative Assembly election, Nomani met Swara Bhasker and her husband Fahad Ahmad, a candidate of Nationalist Congress Party – Sharadchandra Pawar from Anushaktinagar Assembly constituency. He also appealed muslims of Maharashtra to vote for Maha Vikas Aghadi.

== Controversies ==
In August 2021, Nomani praised the Taliban takeover of Afghanistan. He praised the Taliban in one of his video messages stating, "This Hindi [Indian] Muslim salutes you'.

Nomani has contributed to Bhagwa Love Trap theory through his videos. On 31 December 2021, he said in one of his speeches that 8 lakh Muslim women had married Hindus and renounced their faith. He claimed that the RSS has established a wider campaign to equip Hindu youth with essentials of Urdu language and Islam, subsequently training them to seduce Muslim women.

== Literary works ==
- Kya Ab Bhi Na Jagoge?
- Al-Furqan (monthly journal started by his father Manzur Nu'mani).
