= Wazeh Rashid Hasani Nadwi =

Indian Islamic scholar (1932–2019)

Mawlana Muhammad Wazeh Rashid Al-Hasani Al-Nadwi

Secretary of Education, Darul Uloom Nadwatul Ulama
- In office 2006 – 16 January 2019
- Preceded by: Abdullah Abbas Nadwi

Personal details
- Born: 1932 Raebareli, Uttar Pradesh, India
- Died: 16 January 2019 (aged 86–87)
- Education: Darul Uloom Nadwatul Ulama; Aligarh Muslim University

Personal life
- Main interest: Arabic literature
- Relatives: Abul Hasan Ali Hasani Nadwi; Rabey Hasani Nadwi (brother)

Religious life
- Religion: Islam
- Denomination: Sunni
- Jurisprudence: Hanafi
- Movement: Deobandi

Muslim leader
- Students: Abdullah Hasani Nadwi

Muhammad Wazeh Rashid Al-Hasani Al-Nadwi (1932 – 16 January 2019) was an Indian Islamic scholar, Arabic writer, researcher and journalist. He was the nephew of Islamic scholar and reformer Abul Hasan Ali Hasani Nadwi and brother of Rabey Hasani Nadwi.

Nadwi was an alumnus of the Darul Uloom Nadwatul Ulama and the Aligarh Muslim University. He served as head of the education department of Nadwa, secretary general of the International Islamic Literary Organization and Islamic Research Academy. He edited the fortnightly Al-Raid and was also the assistant editor of Al-Baas El-Islami. He received the 'President's Award' in recognition of his contribution to Arabic literature in India.

== Biography ==
Wazeh Rashid Hasani Nadwi was born in 1932 in Raebareli, Uttar Pradesh. His lineage belongs to the family of Shah Alamullah, which was famous in India and abroad for its distinguished services and inimitable children in various fields. He got his early education from Ilahia School at Raebareli and studied Islamic sciences and Arabic language and literature at Darul Uloom Nadwatul Ulama, Lucknow. He obtained his graduation with English honours from Aligarh Muslim University and started his professional life as an Arabic translator and presenter in All India Radio, New Delhi and worked there for twenty years; from 1953–1973 to be exact. In 1973, he joined Darul Uloom Nadwatul Ulama as a teacher of Arabic Language and literature and was promoted to the post of Dean, school of languages. He became the secretary for education of Darul Uloom Nadwatul Ulama in 2006 and till death he was doing this job. Apart from this, he was associated with many academic organizations, and educational institutions in India and Abroad.

He began his journalistic career while he was in All India Radio, New Delhi. During his stay in New Delhi, He translated a number of scientific, literary political and research articles, and stories into Arabic that were relayed from Delhi and other radio stations of the country. The Arabic section of the radio station, New Delhi at that time was seized by Arab broadcasters and translators who were from Arab countries such as Iraq, Syria, Egypt, and Palestine. Among them were writers and storytellers, and some of them were journalists. Al-Nadwi took full advantage of them and gained full experience in journalism and Arabic literature. This is one side of his journalistic life, and the other side is his joining to newspapers and magazines. He grew up in a period when the Arab journalism in India was going through an era of development. And that he witnessed the activities of Abul Kalam Azad, Masoud Alom Nadwi, Muhammad Al-Hasani, and Abul Hasan Ali Hasani Nadwi in the field for the betterment of Arabic journalism from near. He was influenced by them, and their passion for journalism encouraged him to become an ideal journalist with an excellent style.

== Literary works ==
His unique and translated works include:

- Tarikhul Adabil Arabic
- Adabus Sahwah Al Islamiyah
- Harkatut Talimil Islami Phil Hindi wa Tataouurul Manhaj
- Ad Dawatul Islamiyah wa Minhajuha Phil Hind
- Mukhtasarul Shamayilin Nawabiyah
- Ila Nizamin Alamiyin Jadidin
- Al Imam Ahmad bin Irfan Ash Shahid
- Min Sanayatil Maoti Ila Sanayatil Kararat
- A-Lamul Adabil Arabic Phil Asril Hadith
- Ash-Sheikh Abul Hasan Nadwi Qaidan wa Hakiman
- Masadirul Adabil Arabic etc.
