= Nadwatul Ulama =

Council of Muslim scholars

- Formation: 1893; 132 years ago
- Founder: Muhammad Ali Mungeri
- Founded at: Kanpur, British India
- Type: Nonprofit, NGO
- Headquarters: Lucknow, India
- Manager: Bilal Abdul Hai Hasani Nadwi
- Publication: Tameer-e-Hayat
- Website: www.nadwa.in

Nadwatul Ulama is a council of Muslim theologians in India which was formed in 1893 in Kanpur. The first manager of the council was Muhammad Ali Mungeri and the incumbent is Bilal Abdul Hai Hasani Nadwi. The council established the Darul Uloom Nadwatul Ulama, a famous Islamic seminary in Lucknow, on 26 September 1898.

== History ==
In 1893, during the annual congregation of the Madrasa Faiz-e-Aam in Kanpur, a group of Muslim scholars unanimously formed a council, Nadwatul Ulama, and agreed to schedule its first meet the upcoming year. This congregation was attended by Mahmud Hasan Deobandi, Ashraf Ali Thanwi, Khalil Ahmad Saharanpuri, Muhammad Ali Mungeri, Sanaullah Amritsari, Fakhrul Hasan Gangohi, Aḥmad Ḥasan Kanpuri and others. The motive behind the formation of this council was "to reform the prevalent educational system and to eliminate the differences among Muslim groups on different religious issues." Muhammad Ali Mungeri, who was appointed its first manager, is thought to be the prime founder.

The first general congregation of the council of Nadwatul Ulama took place between 22 and 24 April 1894 in the Madrasa Faiz-e-Aam, attended by scholars from diverse backgrounds including Shia, Ahl-i Hadith, Deoband, and Aligarh movements, as well as independents. Ahmed Raza Khan, later the founder of the Barelvi school, also participated but subsequently formed a rival group named Jadwah in opposition. Muhammad Ali Mungeri gave the idea of starting a Darul Uloom under the umbrella of Nadwatul Ulama and presented its draft on 12 Muharram 1313 AH as the "Musawwada-e Darul Uloom". This draft was approved on 11 April 1896 in the third general meet of Nadwatul Ulama in Bareilly. The Darul Uloom established under the Nadwatul Ulama is the Darul Uloom Nadwatul Ulama.

== Construction of Darul Uloom ==
Muhammad Ali Mungeri went to Lucknow alongside scholars such as Habibur Rahman Khan Sherwani and Zahoorul Islam Fatehpuri to look for a land in order to construct the Darul Uloom Nadwatul Ulama. Munshi Ehtesham Ali donated his land for the seminary. Prior to the construction of the seminary, he bought a big house in Gola Ganj and handed it over to the Nadwatul Ulama, and the office of the council shifted to Lucknow on 2 September 1898. The primary classes were started on 26 September 1898. The Darul Uloom Nadwatul Ulama is seen among the famous Islamic institutions in India.

== Managers ==
Muhammad Ali Mungeri was appointed the first manager of Nadwatul Ulama in its meet of inception. He was succeeded by Masihuzzaman Khan as an interim manager for three years, who however resigned on 19 July 1903.

Khalilur Rahman Saharanpuri was appointed manager in 1905. He served the position till July 1915 when Abdul Hai Hasani was appointed the manager. Ali Hasan Khan was appointed the manager following Hasani's death. The last four general meetings of Nadwatul Ulama where held during his time. On 9 June 1931, Hakeem Abdul Ali was appointed the manager. He remained on the post for thirty years. Abdul Ali was succeeded by Abul Hasan Ali Hasani Nadwi as the manager in 1961. Rabey Hasani Nadwi became the manager of Nadwatul Ulama in 2000, and was succeeded by Bilal Abdul Hai Hasani Nadwi following his death on 13 April 2023.

== See also ==
- List of Deobandi organisations
