= Rabey Hasani Nadwi =

Indian Islamic scholar (1929–2023)

8th Chancellor of Darul Uloom Nadwatul Ulama
- In office 2000 – 13 April 2023
- Preceded by: Abul Hasan Ali Hasani Nadwi
- Succeeded by: Bilal Abdul Hai Hasani Nadwi

9th Principal of Darul Uloom Nadwatul Ulama
- In office 1993–2000
- Preceded by: Muhibbullah Lari Nadwi
- Succeeded by: Saeed-ur-Rahman Azmi Nadvi

President of All India Muslim Personal Law Board
- In office 22 June 2002 – 13 April 2023
- Preceded by: Mujahidul Islam Qasmi
- Succeeded by: Khalid Saifullah Rahmani

Personal life
- Born: 29 October 1929 Takia Kalan, Raebareli, United Provinces, British India
- Died: 13 April 2023 (aged 93) Lucknow, Uttar Pradesh, India
- Relatives: Wazeh Rashid Hasani Nadwi (younger brother); Jafar Masood Hasani Nadwi (nephew and son-in-law)

Religious life
- Religion: Islam
- Denomination: Sunni Islam
- Jurisprudence: Hanafi

Muslim leader
- Students: Abdullah Hasani Nadwi
- Influenced by: Abul Hasan Ali Hasani Nadwi
- Awards: Presidential Award (1970)

Mohammad Rabey Hasani Nadwi (29 October 1929 – 13 April 2023) was an Indian Sunni Islamic scholar, who served as the president of All India Muslim Personal Law Board and as the chancellor of Darul Uloom Nadwatul Ulama, an Islamic seminary in Lucknow, India. He was the patron of Islamic Fiqh Academy, the vice president of the Aalami Rabita Adab-e-Islami in Riyadh, and a founding member of the Muslim World League. He was regularly listed in the publication The 500 Most Influential Muslims. His disciples included Ijteba Nadwi.

== Early life and education ==
Rabey Hasani Nadwi was born on 29 October 1929 to Rasheed Ahmad Hasani in Takia Kalan, Raebareli, British India. He was a nephew of author and reformer Abul Hasan Ali Nadwi. He graduated from Darul Uloom Nadwatul Ulama in 1948. He studied at the Darul Uloom Deoband for one year, and also travelled to Hejaz for his higher studies. He studied Arabic language and literature, majorly with his uncle Abul Hasan Ali Nadwi. His other teachers included Abdul Qadir Raipuri, Abrarul Haq Haqqi and Hussain Ahmad Madani.

== Career ==
Nadwi became an assistant professor at Darul Uloom Nadwatul Ulama in 1952, head of its Arabic department in 1955, and the dean of faculty of Arabic in 1970. He was featured in the publication The 500 Most Influential Muslims.

Nadwi served as the vice president of Riyadh-based Aalami Rabita Adab-e-Islami and the president of Lucknow-based institutions Majlis-e-Tehqiqat-o-Nashariyat Islam and Majlis-e-Sahafat-o-Nashariyat, the latter being a part of the Darul Uloom Nadwatul Ulama. He was a founding member of the Muslim World League. He became principal (mohtamim) of the Darul Uloom Nadwatul Ulama in 1993 and was appointed the deputy-manager of its managing body, the Nadwatul Ulama in 1999. He became seminary's chancellor in 2000, following the death of Abul Hasan Ali Nadwi. He held this position until his death. His disciples included Ijteba Nadwi and Zafarul Islam Khan.

Nadwi wrote on Arabic literature, biographies, geography, literary criticism and theology. He has been called an expert on the history of Arabic literature and geography. He received an award from Indian Council Uttar Pradesh and a Presidential Award for his contribution to Arabic language and literature.

On 22 June 2002, Nadwi succeeded Mujahidul Islam Qasmi as the president of All India Muslim Personal Law Board. He guided the Muslim community towards using the media in a better way. During a conference in 2016, he said, "The day when Muslims will hold command over media will definitely be a better day not only for Muslims but for the rest of the world". He advocated for interfaith dialogue, and according to The Hindu, "he constantly advised the community [Muslims] to refrain from anger and violence, and follow the path of patience and perseverance."

== Literary works ==
Nadwi founded bi-monthly journal Al-Raid, in Lucknow, and was its patron; he edited Karwan-i-Adab, Lucknow. He authored 18 books in Urdu, and almost the same number of books in Arabic. His book Jazirat al-'Arab has been called a unique book about geography in Urdu. He wrote books on the history of Arabic literature and poetry. These include al-Adab al-ʻArabī bayna ʻarḍ wa-naqd and Tārīkh al-Adab al-ʻArabī. Several of his books are part of the curriculum at the Darul Uloom Nadwatul Ulama. His other works include:

- ʻĀlam-i Islām aur sāmrājī niẓām : imkānāt, andeshe, aur mashvare
- Dīn o adab
- Fiqh-i Islāmī aur ʻaṣr-i jadīd
- Muslim samāj, z̲immah dāriyān̲ aur taqāz̤e
- Samāj kī taʻlīm o tarbiyat : Mag̲h̲ribī tajurbāt aur Islāmī taṣavvur
- Sirājan munīran, Rahbar-i insāniyat ṣallaláhu ʻalaihi va sallam.

== Death ==
Nadwi died on 13 April 2023, at age 93, in Lucknow.

== Legacy ==
On 1 June 2023, an international seminar entitled The Life and Work of Murshidul Ummah Shaykh Sayed Muhammad Rabey Hasani Nadwi (RA) took place at the International Islamic University Chittagong in Bangladesh. The chief guest at the event was Sultan Zauq Nadvi, a disciple of Rabey Hasani and the founder of Jamia Darul Ma'arif Al-Islamia. Abu Reza Muhammad Nezamuddin, the Chairman of the Board of Trustees of IIUC and a Member of Parliament, delivered the welcoming remarks. Additionally, Anwarul Azim Arif and Obaidullah Hamzah were among the participants in the seminar.

== See also ==
- Syed Sulaiman Nadvi
- Mohammad Akram Nadwi
- Salman Husaini Nadwi
