= Darul Uloom Nadwatul Ulama =

Madrasah in Lucknow, India

Coordinates: 26.8651°N 80.9325°E

Dārul Uloom Nadwatul Ulama
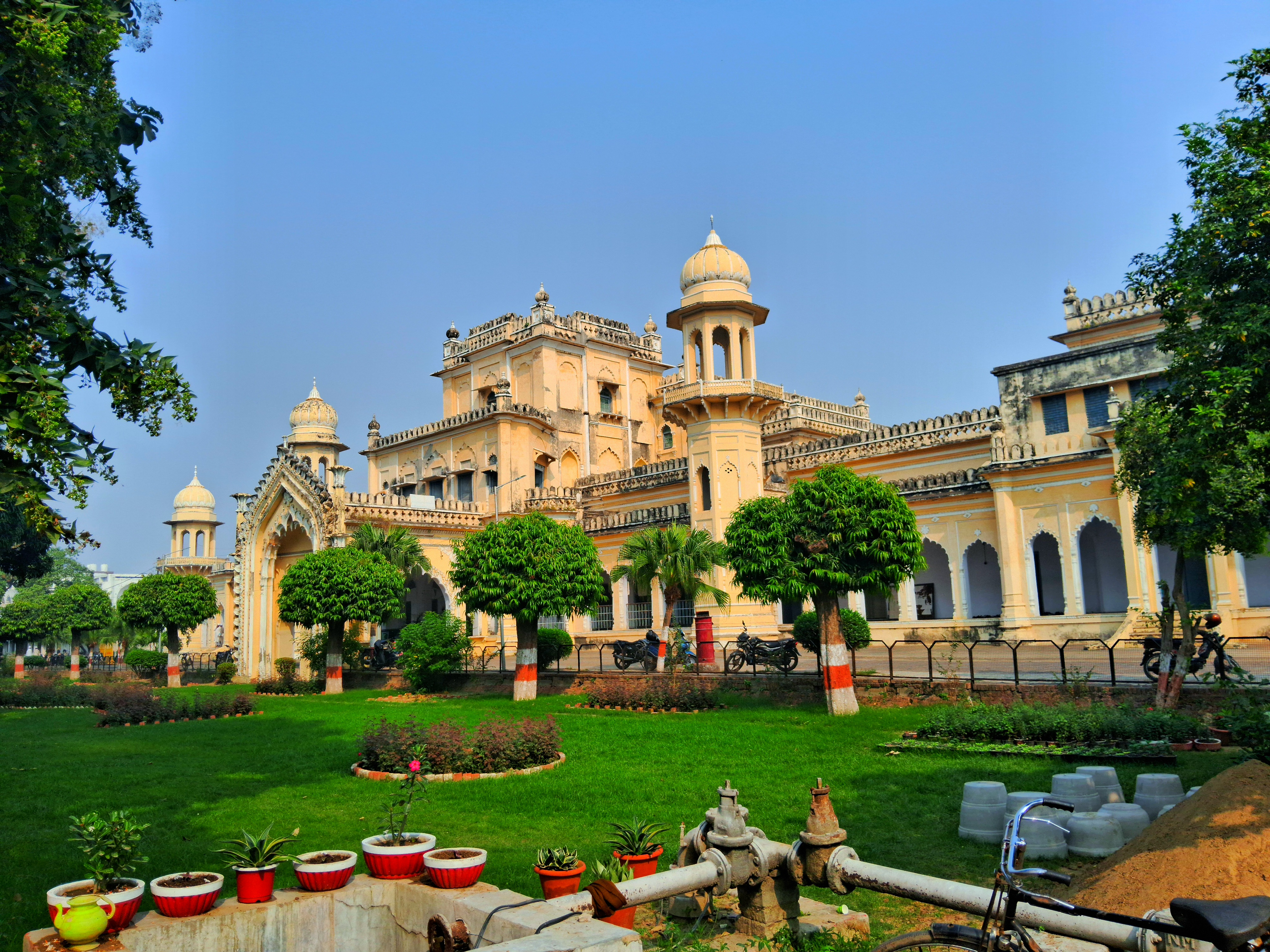
- Motto: إلى الإسلام من جديد (transl. Towards Islam anew)
- Type: Islamic seminary
- Established: 26 September 1898 (128 years ago)
- Founder: Muhammad Ali Mungeri
- Affiliations: Nadwatul Ulama
- Chancellor: Bilal Abdul Hai Hasani Nadwi
- Principal: Abdul Aziz Khalifa Bhatkali Nadwi
- Location: 504/21G, Mankameshwar Mandir Marg, Mukarimnagar, Hasanganj., Lucknow, Uttar Pradesh, 226007, India
- Campus: Urban
- Website: nadwa.in

Darul Uloom Nadwatul Ulama (translated as, House of Knowledge and Assembly of Scholars University) is an Islamic seminary in Lucknow, India. It was established by the Nadwatul Ulama, a council of Muslim scholars, on 26 September 1898.

== History ==
Nadwatul Ulama was formed with the aim to bring all the sects of Islam together irrespective of some of their differences in beliefs.

Nadwa means assembly and group, it was named so because it was constituted by a group of Indian Islamic scholars from different theological schools. Darululoom is the educational body of Nadwatul Ulama which was formed in Kanpur in 1893. It was eventually shifted to Lucknow in 1898 and the Islamic curriculum was updated with modern sciences, mathematics, vocational training and the addition of an English Department.

On 2 September 1898, the office of the Nadwatul Ulama was shifted to Lucknow. The Darul Uloom Nadwatul Ulama was started on 26 September 1898.

== Administration ==
The manager of Nadwatul Ulama serves as the chancellor of Darul Uloom. In 2000, Rabey Hasani Nadwi became the chancellor.

Hafeezullah Azami was appointed the first principal of the Darul Uloom Nadwatul Ulama. In 2000, when Rabey Hasani Nadawi was appointed the chancellor, Saeed-ur-Rahman Azmi Nadvi became the principal.

== Publications ==
- Al-Nadwa, first monthly Urdu magazine
- Al-Ziya, first monthly Arabic magazine
- Al-Baas El-Islami, current monthly Arabic magazine
- Al-Raid: current biweekly Arabic magazine
- Tameer-e-Hayat, current biweekly Urdu magazine
- Sachha Raahi, Hindi magazine
- The Fragrence of East, English magazine

== Alumni ==
The graduates of the Darul Uloom Nadwatul Ulama are usually referred as Nadwis. The alumni include:

- Sulaiman Nadvi
- Abul Hasan Ali Hasani Nadwi
- Wadeh Rashid Hasani Nadwi
- Ijteba Nadwi
- Minnatullah Rahmani
- Mohammad Akram Nadwi
- Rabey Hasani Nadwi
- Abdullah Hasani Nadwi
- Sajjad Nomani
- Shihabuddin Nadvi
- Abdur Rahman Kashgari Nadwi
- Syed Ehtisham Ahmed Nadvi
- Wali Hasan Tonki
- Yasin Mazhar Siddiqi
- Shafiqur Rahman Nadwi
- Jafar Masood Hasani Nadwi
- Salman Husaini Nadwi
- Bilal Abdul Hai Hasani Nadwi
- Shihabuddin Nadvi
- Muhammad Azam Nadwi
- Mohibbullah Nadvi
- Shamail Nadwi

== See also ==
- List of Deobandi madrasas

== More sources ==
- Al Ulamaa Al Baarizoona Min Daaril Uloom Li Nadwatil Ulamaa Alladheena Hasaloo Alaa Al Jaayizah At Taqdeeriyya Li Nashri Al Lugha Alarabiyya Wa Aadaabihaa
- Musahamatu darul uloom nadwatul ulama fi nashril lughatil arabiati wal adabil Islami wa dauruha fi majalis sahafati wal elam
- Ansari, Mohammad Asjad (2017). Modern education in Madrasas A perspective study of different schools of thought (Thesis). Jamia Milia Islamia. p. 126–140.
- Ahmed, Fakhar Uddin Ali (2010). Arabic studies in educational institutions of Assam since 1947 (Thesis). India: Gauhati University. pp. 204–208.
- Mujab, Muhammad (2001). Islamic sciences in india and indonesia: a comparative study (Thesis). India: Department of Sunni Theology, Aligarh Muslim University. pp. 84–96. hdl:10603/58830.
- Ishaq Jalees Nadwi (2017). Tārīkh Nadwatul Ulama (in Urdu). Vol. 1. Lucknow: Majlis Sahāfat-o-Nashriyāt.
- Shams Tabrez Khan (2015). Tārīkh Nadwatul Ulama (in Urdu). Vol. 2. Lucknow: Majlis Sahāfat-o-Nashriyāt.
- Ramzan, Shazia; Rubab, Ainee (2017). "A Comprative Study Of The Ideological Orientations And Methodology Of Dar Ul Uloom Deoband, Nadwatul Ulama And Aligarh School". Al Qalam. 22 (1): 1–10. doi:10.51506/alQalam.26(2)279. ISSN 2707-0077. Archived from the original on 21 October 2022.
- Ullah, Zia; Rahman, Fazl ur; Khan, Sarzamin (2022). "Intellectual and Preachment struggles of Nadwat ul Ulamā (Lucknow India)". Malakand University Research Journal of Islamic Studies (in Urdu). 4 (01): 58–70. ISSN 2708-6577.
- Decolonisation and the Nadvatul Ulema
- Seerat-e-maulana Syed Mohammad Ali Mungeri
- Darul Uloom Nadvat-ul-ulama
- Daur-o-Daril uloom Li Nadwatil ulama Fi Tarweej il Adabil Arabi wad Dirasatil Islamiah: Dirasah Tahliliyah Naqdiyah
- Modernization and reform in Islamic education a comparative study of Darul Ulum Deoband and Nadwatul Ulama 1870 1950
- A critical study of educational movements and institutions with special reference to Darul Ulum Deoband Aligarh Muslim University Aligarh Nadwatul Ulama Lucknow and Jamia Millia Islamia Delhi
