= Islam and the World =

1951 book by Abul Hasan Ali Hasani Nadwi

- Cover of 2003 English Version
- Author: Abul Hasan Ali Hasani Nadwi
- Original title: ماذا خسر العالم بانحطاط المسلمين
- Working title: Islam and the World: The Rise and Decline of the Muslims and Its Effect on Mankind
- Language: Arabic
- Subject: History of Islam
- Publication date: 1951
- Publication place: Egypt
- English publication date: 1983
- Media type: Hardcover
- Pages: 219
- ISBN: 978-1872531328 English Version
- OCLC: 64739803
- Dewey Decimal: 297.09
- LC Class: BP53.N313 1994
- Website: abulhasanalinadwi.org

Islam and the World: The Rise and Decline of the Muslims and Its Effect on Mankind or Maza Khasir al-Alam Bi Inhitatil Muslimeen (Arabic: ماذا خسر العالم بانحطاط المسلمين) is a book by Abul Hasan Ali Hasani Nadwi for which has received admiration, especially throughout the Arab world, where it was first published in 1951 from Egypt. The book is a precise analysis of history from the Age of Ignorance of Arabia to the Modern age. This work of Nadwi aims at, to stir the Muslims into an appreciation of Islam's role in the story of human progress, and to promote them, thereby, a desire to look into themselves, with a view to finding out how far they have been true their duty and mission to the world. It presents Islam as an eternal reality and a program of life, which can never, grew obsolete. Nadwi through this work re-instills hope of revival of Islam on the seat of world leadership.

== Background ==
It was first published with a foreword by the leading modernist writer Ahmad Amin. However, many who read the book, including King Abdullah-I of Jordan, felt that Ahmad Amin's forward lacked a fuller understanding of the book's driving theme. The second and subsequent editions of the book carried a new forward, this one by Sayyid Qutb. The book was later translated into English under the title of Islam and the World and into Urdu as Insani Dunya Par Musalmanu Ke Uruj wa Zawal Ka Athar.

== Summary ==
Firstly, the author presents a picture of moral degradation of societies before the advent of Islam, their political, social, economic, and moral deterioration. Sayyid Qutb of Egypt has stated in his foreword,

What was the condition of the world before the advent of Islam and the state of affairs in the east and the west, the north, and the south? What was the intellectual temper of man from China to India, and from Persia to Rome? What was the color and texture of contemporary societies? In what state were those Faiths of the world, which based on heavenly sanctions like Judaism and Christianity, and those, that worshiped idols and fire like Hinduism and Paganism? The questions with which the book actually starts, dealt with in a concise and comprehensive manner. The figure that the book presents of that age is clear-cut and delineates its features with accuracy and insight. There was not a single man and movement of reformation that exists in the whole world. Even the religious sections in various societies like priests and rabbis; have introduced unrecognized activities and rituals in their religion for the sake of their materialistic interests.

—

According to Sayyid Qutb, "The book in its style and treatment does not however, ponder to mere sentiments or excite passions of dogmation. The claims that it makes are sustained by solid scholarship and objective research in a manner that appeals both to the mind and heart. The enlightened and unprejudiced mind of the author is clearly revealed by the scrupulous care and deep concern for truth with which historical events and their sequences are recorded and environmental effects and ramifications analyzed. Decisions are left to the discernment of enlightened minds and a conscience that is sensitive to truth. Topics have been discussed, arranged and interfered in such a manner that no conclusion is ever forced on the reader."

After describing the age of ignorance (Jahiliyah), in its salient feature, the author has outlined the part played by Islam in the reconstruction of humanity. It delineates upon the role of Islam in saving the human society from decadence and degeneration, in liberating the soul of man from superstitious and banalities, emancipated him from the evils of slavery and degradation, and liberated man from the tyranny of kings and the dominance of priests. It struck a harmonious balance between the world of faith and world of action, therefore Islam never proved to be barrier to progress and science. It was Islam that made earlier Muslims great but the later generations deviated from the teachings of Islam resulting in the decline of Muslim fortunes. The author describes succinctly the reasons for the material and spiritual decay among the Muslims and points out that the ham the Muslims sustained was deviation from the principle of their faith and turning away from the responsibilities it entailed upon them. Thus, according to Nadwi, with the failure of the Muslims to sustain and discharge efficiently the great responsibility of trusteeship of humankind which Islam enjoined upon them, Islam lost its world leadership and paved the way for West to take the leadership of the world, which is based on sheer materialism. Therefore, ignorance, which prevailed before Islam reigned again in the garb of Western civilization. Then, Nadwi explains the cruel and catastrophic consequences of the transfer of world-leadership from the Muslims to the Western people, whose appetites are purely material and who have, thereof, built-up a structure which is utterly inimical to the needs of human mind and spirit.

== Translations ==
=== Bengali ===
It was translated into Bengali in 2002 by Abu Saeed Muhammad Omar Ali, one of the directors of Islamic Foundation Bangladesh. In 2013, another Bengali translation was done by Abu Taher Misbah.

=== English ===
Several English editions of this book have been published. Muhammad Asif Kidwai's translation was published in 1983 by the Holy Quran Publications House in Lebanon.

=== Urdu ===
The Urdu translation of this book is titled Insani Dunya Par Musalmanu Ke Uruj wa Zawal Ka Athar.

=== Persian ===
The first Persian translation was published by Jalsat Ilmi Islam Shenasi of Qom, Iran.

== Legacy ==
The book is included in the syllabus of Muslim Brotherhood. In 2011, Hazrat Hasanuzzaman completed a PhD thesis in Arabic on Socio Historical Aspects In The Writings Of Abul Hasan Ali Nadwi With Special Reference To Ma Dha Khasira Al Aalam Bi Inhitatil Muslimeen at the Assam University.

== See also ==
- Bibliography of Abul Hasan Ali Hasani Nadwi
