= Bibliography of Abul Hasan Ali Hasani Nadwi =

- Nadwi pictured in 1995

This bibliography of Abul Hasan Ali Hasani Nadwi is a selected list of generally available scholarly resources related to Abul Hasan Ali Hasani Nadwi, a leading Islamic scholar, philosopher, writer, preacher, reformer and a Muslim public intellectual of 20th century India, the author of numerous books on history, biography, contemporary Islam and the Muslim community in India. He wrote a 7 volume autobiography in Urdu titled Karwan-e-Zindagi in 1983–1999. In this work, he tried to cover all the information related to himself as well as the remarkable events of his life. This list will include his biographies, theses written on him and articles published about him in various journals, newspapers, encyclopedias, seminars, websites etc. in APA style.

== Encyclopedias ==
- Adamec, Ludwig W. (2017). Historical dictionary of Islam (3rd ed.). Lanham: Rowman & Littlefield Publishers. p. 317. ISBN 978-1-4422-7724-3. OCLC 953919222.
- BİRIŞIK, ABDULHAMİT (1988–2016). "NEDVÎ, Ebü'l-Hasan". TDV Encyclopedia of Islam (44+2 vols.) (in Turkish). Istanbul: Turkiye Diyanet Foundation, Centre for Islamic Studies.
- Esposito, John L. (2003). "Nadwi, Abul Hasan Ali". The Oxford Dictionary of Islam. Oxford University Press. ISBN 978-0-19-512558-0.
- Qureshi, Jawad Anwar (2014). "Nadwī, Abū al-Ḥasan". The Oxford Encyclopedia of Islam and Politics. Oxford University Press. ISBN 978-0-19-973935-6.

== Biographies ==
- Abu Ali al-Banjari an Nadwi (2000). Al-ʻAlim al-ʻAllaamah Samahatus Syaikh As-Sayyid Abul Hasan Ali al-Hasani an-Nadwi rahimahullahu taʻala: sejarah hidup dan pemikirannya (in Indonesian). Pokok Sena, Kedah Darulaman: Khazanah Banjariah. ISBN 983-2052-30-0. OCLC 52681407.
- Ahmad, Salah al-Din Maqbul (2001). Al-Ustadh Abul Hasan al-Nadwi wa al-Wajh al-Akhar min Kitabatihi (in Arabic). India: Dar Ghras.
- Ahmad H. Osman, Rahmah; Nasir, Mohd Shahrizal (2011). Ahmad H. Osman, Rahmah (ed.). Manhaj Al-adab Al-islami Ind Al-shayhu Abi Al-hasan Ali An-nadwi (in Arabic). Kuala Lumpur: IIUM Press. pp. 109–147. ISBN 978-967-0225-59-3.
- Ak̲h̲tar, Safīr (2002). Maulānā Sayyid Abulḥasan ʻAlī Nadvī: ḥayāt va āfkār ke cand pahlū (PDF) (in Urdu). Bainulāqvāmī Islāmī Yūnīvarsiṭī, Islāmābād: Idārah-yi Taḥqīqāt-i Islāmī. OCLC 609185194.
- Al-Azhari, Hafiz Nadwi (1986). Al ustadh Abu Al-hasan Al-nadawiu Katiban Wamufakiran (PDF) (in Arabic) (2nd ed.). kuwait: Dar Al Qalam.
- Ali, Sheikh Jameil (2010). Islamic thought and movement in the subcontinent: a study of Sayyid Abu A'la Mawdudi and Sayyid Abul Hasan Ali Nadwi. New Delhi: D.K. Printworld. ISBN 978-81-246-0491-5. OCLC 519250147.
- Ayyūbī Nadvī, Muḥammad T̤āriq (2018). Mufakkir-i Islām, ek mut̤ālaʻah (in Urdu). Lakhnaʼū. ISBN 978-93-84876-50-0. OCLC 1193559289.
- Āzādī, Muḥammad ʻAbd al-Salām. (2006). al-Taʼṣīl al-Islāmī lil-lughah al-ʻArabīyah wa-ādābuhā: fī juhūd al-Shaykh Abī al-Ḥasan al-Nadwī raʼīs Rābiṭat al-Adab al-Islāmī al-ʻĀlamīyah (in Arabic). al-Manṣūrah [Miṣr]: Dār al-Manārah. ISBN 977-6005-35-7. OCLC 181138241.
- Bahadurzehi-Malakabadi, Abdul Basit (2019). Barrasi-e Zindagi, Asar wa Sabk-e Adabi Allama Syed Abul Hasan Nadwi (in Persian). Iran: Siddiqi. ISBN 9789648274301.
- Binte Salman, Rabeya (2012). Bachcho Ke Ali Miyan (PDF) (in Bengali). Banglabazar, Dhaka: Muhammad Brothers. ISBN 9789849017899.
- Choughley, Abdul Kader (2011). Islamic resurgence: Sayyid Abul Ḥasan 'Ali Nadwī and his contemporaries. New Delhi: D.K. Printworld. ISBN 978-81-246-0573-8. OCLC 697779362.
- Choughley, Abdul Kader (2012). Sayyid Abul Ḥasan 'Ali Nadwi: life and works. New Delhi: D.K. Printworld. ISBN 978-81-246-0611-7. OCLC 768399289.
- Ghazali, Mohd. Rumaizuddin (2016). Biografi agung Abu Al-Hasan Ali Al-Nadwi (in Indonesian). Rohidzir Rais (Cetakan pertama ed.). Selangor. ISBN 978-967-86-0592-2. OCLC 954011548.
- Ghūrī, ʻAbd al-Mājid (2005). Abu al-Hasan al-Nadawi, the imam, thinker, preacher, writer and author (PDF) (in Arabic) (3rd ed.). Dimashq: Dār Ibn Kathīr.
- Ghūrī, ʻAbd al-Mājid (2009). al-ʻAllāmah Abū al-Ḥasan al-Nadwī: rāʼid al-adab al-Islāmī (PDF) (in Arabic). Dimashq: Dār Ibn Kathīr. ISBN 978-9953-520-21-6. OCLC 664840655.
- Hartung, Jan-Peter (2004). Viele Wege und ein Ziel: Leben und Wirken von Sayyid Abū l-Ḥasan ʻAlī al-Ḥasanī Nadwī (1914-1999) (in German). Würzburg: Ergon. ISBN 3-89913-377-3. OCLC 60375041.
- Hayʼah al-ʻĀmmah. Muʼtamar, Rābiṭat al-Adab al-Islāmī (2002). al-Shaykh Abū al-Ḥasan al-Nadwī: buḥūth wa-dirāsāt (al-Ṭabʻah 1 ed.). Bayrūt: Muʼassasat al-Risālah. ISBN 9953-400-29-6. OCLC 50749277.
- Khan, Zubair Zafar (2014). Islamic thought of Maulana Abul Hasan Ali Nadwi. New Delhi. ISBN 978-93-84081-04-1. OCLC 892788212.
- Muḥammad Muntaẓir, Abd al-Ḥafīẓ (2004). Muqaddimāt al-Imām al-ʻAllāmah al-Dāʻīyah al-Mufakkir al-Islāmī al-Kabīr al-Shaykh Abī al-Ḥasan ʻAlī al-Ḥasanī al-Nadwī, 1333-1430 H/1914-1999 M (in Arabic). Bayrūt: Muʼassasat al-Risālah Nāshirūn. ISBN 9953-32-097-7. OCLC 220971552.
- Nadwi, Irfan Farooqui (2011). Hazrat Maulana Abul Hasan Ali Nadvi Rahmatullah Alaihi (PDF) (in Hindi). Ahsan Manzil, Tagore Marg Daliganj, Lucknow: Maktba Ahsan.
- Nadwī, Muḥammad Rābiʻ Ḥasanī (2014). Syed Abul Hasan Ali Nadwi: an eminent scholar, thinker, and reformer (PDF). New Delhi. ISBN 978-81-246-0746-6. OCLC 904246429.
- Nadwi, Mohsen Usmani (2002). Mutalla Tasanifaat Maulana Syed Abu Al Hasan Ali Nadwi (in Urdu). India: Arshi Publications.
- Nadwi, Yoosuf Mohammed (2002). Sayyid Abul Hasan Nadwi: Jeevithavum Darshanavum (PDF) (in Malayalam). Kerala, India: Sayyid Abul Hasan Ali Nadwi Islamic Academy.
- Narui, Abdul Latif (2015). Jalwa Hai Az Zindagi, Andisheha wa Khidmat-e-Allama Syed Abul Hasan Nadwi (in Persian) (2nd ed.). Nasim-e-Hijaz. ISBN 9786006751344.
- Salman, Muhammad (2002). Allama Syed Abul Hasan Ali Nadvi Rh. Life and Work (PDF) (in Bengali). Mirpur, Dhaka: Al Irfan Publications.
- Shaykh, ʻAbd al-Munʻim ʻUthmān Aḥmad (2010). Abū al-Ḥasan al-Nadwī: ḥayātuhu, wa-fikruhu al-tarbawī (in Arabic). al-Kharṭūm: Hayyat Al'aemal Al-fikria. ISBN 978-99942-59-43-4. OCLC 761183339.
- Sultān, Rafʻat (2017). Maulānā Abūlḥasan ʻAlī Nadvī: ʻabqarī shak̲h̲ṣiyat (in Urdu). Bhopāl: Babul Ilm Publications. ISBN 978-81-935199-4-3. OCLC 1052905314.
- Washmī, ʻAbd Allāh ibn Ṣāliḥ ibn Sulaymān. (2005). Juhūd Abī al-Ḥasan al-Nadwī al-naqdīyah fī al-adab al-Islāmī: qirāʼah taṣḥīḥīyah (in Arabic) (al-Ṭabʻah 1 ed.). al-Riyāḍ: Maktabat al-Rushd. ISBN 9960-01-421-5. OCLC 65166130.
- Zaheer, Syed Iqbal (2005). Abul Hasan Ali An-Nadwi: A Man of Hope Through a Century of Turmoil (PDF). United States: Independently Published. ISBN 979-8-6826-7711-5.
- Zulkifli Mohamad (2015). Maulana Syeikh Abu Al-Hasan Ali Al-Nadwi: da'i, muslih, alim dan rabbani (in Malayalam). Kuala Lumpur. ISBN 978-983-46-0941-2. OCLC 916409356.

== Theses ==
- Abdul Sahib Khdoom, El Maliki Haidar (2016). Abul hasan al nadawi manhajuhu wakutubuhu aladabiyyah (PhD) (in Arabic). India: Dr. Babasaheb Ambedkar Marathwada University. hdl:10603/147893.
- Abdullah, Siti Mariam (2020). Nilai-Nilai Murni Menurut Abī Al-Hasan Alī Al-Hasani Al-Nadāwīy Dalam Kitab Sīrah Khātamun Al-Nabīyyīn Lil Aṭfāl (PhD) (in Malayalam). Universiti Sains Malaysia.
- Ahmad, Nisar (2021). Al seerah Al Zatiia Ali Tantavi Wa Abil Hasan Ali Nadwi Dirasah Tehliliyah (PhD) (in Arabic). India: Department of Arabic, Jamia Millia Islamia. hdl:10603/371538.
- Ahmad, Peer Maqsood (1992). Contribution of Maulana Syed Abul Hassan Ali Nadwi to Arabic Language and Literature (PhD) (in Arabic). India: Department of Arabic, University of Kashmir. hdl:10603/140862.
- Ahmed, Abdus Sagir (2012). Contribution Of Abul Hasan Ali Nadwi To The Development Of Arabic Children's Literature A Study (PhD). India: Department of Arabic, Gauhati University. hdl:10603/382062.
- Arshad, Mohd (2021). Ishamatu Abbas Mahmud Al Aqqad Wa Abi Al Hasan Ali AlHasani Al Nadwi Fi Adab Al Seerah Al Nabawiyyah Al Shareefah Dirasah Muqarinah (PhD) (in Arabic). India: Department of Arabic, Jamia Millia Islamia. hdl:10603/408547.
- Bhat, Samee-Ullah (2017). Syed Abul Hasan Ali Nadwis Contribution to Islamic History A Study with Special Reference to his Tarikh i Dawat o Azimat (PhD). India: Shah-i-Hamdan Institute of Islamic Studies, University of Kashmir. hdl:10603/207015.
- Choughuley, Abdul Kader (2008). Da'wah, peace and dialogue in the writings of Sayyid Abul Hasan 'Ali Nadwi, 1913–1999 (MA). South Africa: University of Johannesburg. hdl:10210/1247.
- Diyafi, Nur al-Din (2021). Al-Ummah al-Islamiyyah fi Fikr Abi al-Hasan al-Nadwi: Mazahir al-Azmah wa 'Awamil al-Nahdah (PDF) (PhD thesis) (in Arabic). Algeria: Batna 1 University.
- Gaffar, Abdul (2004). The contributions of Moulana Abul Hasan Ali Nadvi to Urdu language and literature (PhD) (in Urdu). India: Sree Sankaracharya University of Sanskrit. hdl:10603/137480.
- Hasanuzzaman, Hazrat (2011). Socio_historical aspects in the writings of Abul Hasan Ali Nadwi with special reference to Ma_Dha Khasira Al_Aalam Bi_Inhitatil Muslimeen (PhD) (in Arabic). India: Department of Arabic, Assam University. hdl:10603/97104.
- Hussain, Amir (2023). Socio Political Aspects In The Writings Of Maulana Sayyid Abul Hasan Ali Al Nadwi A Study (PhD) (in Arabic). India: Department of Arabic, Gauhati University. hdl:10603/458952.
- Koser, Zabina (2021). Abul Hasan Ali Al Hasani al Nadwi and his Views on Islam and Muslim World A Critical Study (PhD) (in Urdu). India: School of Islamic Studies, Baba Ghulam Shah Badshah University. hdl:10603/489663.
- Laique, Asif (2019). Role of Abul Hasan Ali Nadwi in Developing Islamic Literature in The Arabic Language: An Analytical Study (PhD). India: Department of Arabic, Maulana Azad National Urdu University. hdl:10603/337819.
- Mohamed al-Dulaimi, Abdel Wahed Makhlouf (2013). Abu al-Hasan Nadwi and systematization in his book Biography of the Prophet (PhD) (in Arabic). Iraq: Department of History, University of Anbar.
- Musleh Uddin, Muhammad (2009). Syed Abul Hasan Ali Nadvi: Religion and Social Thought (PhD) (in Bengali). Bangladesh: University of Dhaka.
- Noorul Ameen, Mohamood (2013). Philosophical and educational thoughts in the works of Abul Hassan Ali Nadvi (PhD). India: Kannur University. hdl:10603/85300.
- Rahman, Khalieq ur (2021). Twentieth Century Arabic Literature: A Comparative Biographical Study of Ali Tantavi and Abul Hasan Ali Nadwi (PhD thesis) (in Arabic). India: Department of Arabic, University of Kashmir. hdl:10603/417957.
- Sari, Ika Mustika (2012). Islamic educational thought of Abul Hasan Ali Hasani Nadwi (PhD) (in Indonesian). Indonesia: Maulana Malik Ibrahim State Islamic University Malang.
- Shah, Tahir Hussain (2021). Political Interpretation of Religion: A Comparative Study of the Opinions of Abul Ala Maududi, Abul Hasan Ali Nadvi and Wahiduddin Khan (PhD) (in Urdu). Pakistan: Hazara University.
- Sulthoni, Akhmad; Muindinillah, Basri; Syamsul, Hidayat (2013). Abul Hasan Ali An-Nadwi's View of Western Civilization (PhD) (in Indonesian). Indonesia: Muhammadiyah University of Surakarta.
- Yahiya, Mohmmad (2017). Maulana Ali Miyan Nadvi Ki Khaka Nigari Ka Tanqidee Mutalaa (PhD) (in Urdu). India: Panjab University. hdl:10603/103792.
- Zawahir, M. Nafeel M. (2008). Comparative study on Abul Hasan Ali Nadwi's political thought, with particular reference to his contempararies, Abul A'la Mawdudi and Sayyid Qutb (PhD). Lampeter: University of Wales.
- Zubair Zafar, Khan (2010). A critical study of Moulana Abul Hasan Ali nadwis Islamic thought (PhD). India: Department of Islamic Studies, Aligarh Muslim University. hdl:10603/60854.

== Journals ==
- Ahmad, Khalil; Ali, Muhammad Mumtaz; Siddiqi, Yousuf Azim (2020). "Religious Harmony in India's Post-Independence Phase: A Comparative Study of the Approach of Abul Hasan Ali Nadawi and Wahiduddin Khan". AL-ITQAN: Journal of Islamic Sciences and Comparative Studies. 4 (2): 33–49. ISSN 2600-8432.
- Ali, Asma (30 June 2017). "Adabul Atfal Inda-al-Sayyed Abil Hasan Ali-Al-Nadavi". AL-ILM-Journal. 1 (2). ISSN 2618-1142.
- Al-Qasmi, Muhammad Tariq (2014). "Relationships of Abu al-Hasan Ali al-Nadwi with Muhammad Iqbal". Al-Daie. 38 (11). India: Darul Uloom Deoband. ISSN 2347-8950.
- Bahjat, Munjid Mustafa (2009). "Abu al-Hasan al-Nadawi and the Art of Presentations". Journal of Linguistic and Literary Studies. 1 (1). doi:10.31436/jlls.v1i1.132. ISSN 2637-1073.
- Batahir, Bin Esa (1998). "Islamic literature and its criticism of Sheikh Abu Al-Hasan Al-Nadwi". Contemporary Islamic Thought (in Arabic). 3 (12). ISSN 2707-515X.
- Bhat, Samee-Ullah (2017). "Sayyid Abul Hasan Ali Nadwi's contribution to history writing: An analytical study". International Journal of Islamic Thoughts. 6 (1). ISSN 2306-7012.
- Bhat, Samee-Ullah (2019). "Life and Works of Abul Hasan Ali Nadwi (RA): An Analytical Study". Journal of Islamic Thought and Civilization. 6 (1): 47–60. doi:10.32350/jitc.61.
- Bredi, Daniela (1999). "Sādāt in South Asia: the Case of Sayyid abū 'L-ḥasan 'Alī Nadwī". Oriente Moderno. 79 (2): 375–392. doi:10.1163/22138617-07902007. ISSN 2213-8617.
- Gada, Muhammad Yaseen (2019). "How to Study the Qur'an: Sayyid Abul Hasan Ali Nadwi's Approach, written by Choughley, Abdul Kader". Al-Bayan: Journal of Qur'an and Hadith Studies. 17 (2): 247–250. doi:10.1163/22321969-12340076. ISSN 2232-1969. S2CID 213684686.
- Ghazali, Mohd Rumaizuddin (2019). "Tasawwuf and the Spiritual Life according to Abu Hasan Ali Al-Nadwi: An Analysis". Journal of Islamic Social Sciences and Humanities (in Malayalam). 8 (1): 121–142. doi:10.33102/abqari.vol8no0.139 (inactive 11 July 2025). eISSN 2504-8422.
- Ghouri, Syed Abdul Majid (2019). "Sheikh Abul Hassan Ali Hassani Nadwi and His Contributions to The Sciences of Prophetic Hadith: A Concise Expository Study". Al-Irsyad: Journal of Islamic and Contemporary Issues (in Arabic). 4 (1): 57–77. doi:10.53840/alirsyad.v4i1.47 (inactive 11 July 2025). ISSN 2550-1992. S2CID 245722820.
- Hamid, Zubair (2021). "A Study of Mawlana Nadwi's Discourse on "Islam and the West"". Journal of East-West Thought. California State Polytechnic University, Pomona: 75–84. hdl:20.500.12680/12579z310.
- Hartung, Jan-Peter (2009). Christmann, Andreas; Hartung, Jan-Peter (eds.). "Religious Education in Transition: The Moral and Academic Training of Sayyid Abûl-Hasan Alî Nadwî". Journal of Semitic Studies: Supplt: Islamica Studies in Memory of Holger Preissler (1943–2006). 26: 231–255.
- Haq, Ghufran Ul; Naseer, Abdul; Haq, Sami Ul (2021). "Analytical review of literary and invitational aspects in the works and speeches of Abul Hasan Ali Al Nadwi". Al-Azhār (in Arabic). 7 (1): 204–219. doi:10.46896/alazhr.v7i01.55 (inactive 11 July 2025). ISSN 2519-6707.
- Ibrahim, Mulyadi (2020). "Rekontruksi Tazkiyah al-Nafs Menurut Abu Hasan al-Nadwi". At-Tafkir (in Malayalam). 13 (1). doi:10.32505/at.v13i1.1570. ISSN 2620-5858. S2CID 219921727.
- Kamil, Imanuddin; Hafidhuddin, Didin; Mujahidin, Endin; Tamam, Abbas Mansur (2021). "The concept of tarbiyyah ruhiyyah Abu Al-Hasan Ali Al-Nadwi". Ta'dibuna: Jurnal Pendidikan Islam (in Malayalam). 10 (2): 272. doi:10.32832/tadibuna.v10i2.4317. ISSN 2622-7215. S2CID 237893960.
- Khan, Janas; Akhtar, Saeed; Rahman, Ata Ur; Anas, Muhammad; Zahoor Shah, Syed (2016). "An Application and Appraisal of Abul Hasan Ali Nadwi's Views about Orientalists' Stratagems and Contribution" (PDF). Journal of Applied Environmental and Biological Sciences. 6 (3): 26–30. ISSN 2090-4274.
- Kusumah, Mada Wijaya (2019). "An-nadwi's Education Thoughts In The Book Of Ash-shira Baina Al-fikrah Al-islamiyyah Wa Al-fikrah Al-gharbiyyah". Râyah al-Islâm: Jurnal Ilmu Islam (in Indonesian). 1 (1): 2016. doi:10.31227/osf.io/2rcdf. ISSN 2503-3816. S2CID 240864134.
- Mannar, M. Abduh Al; Tamam, Abas Mansur; Syafri, Ulil Amri (2018). "20 Concepts Of An Nadwi Islamic Education In Fighting Liberalization". Prosiding Bimbingan Konseling (in Malayalam): 177–185. Archived from the original on 14 October 2022.
- Miftah, Mukerrem (2016). "Islamic Civilization between Crisis and Revival: A Comparative Appraisal of the Works of Abul Hassan Ali-Nadwi and Ali Allawi". Islamic Perspective. 16: 113–135.
- Monang, Sori (2018). "Reconstruction of Western Civilization Viewed by Sayyid Abû al-asanas' Alî al-Ḥasanî al-Nadwî". Budapest International Research and Critics Institute-Journal. 1 (2): 1–12. doi:10.33258/birci.v1i2.8. ISSN 2615-3076. S2CID 166028805.
- Monang, Sori (2020). "Theological Thinking Abû al-Ḥasan 'Alî al-Hasani al-Nadwî". Britain International of Humanities and Social Sciences (BIoHS) Journal. 2 (2): 586–593. doi:10.33258/biohs.v2i2.261. ISSN 2685-3868. S2CID 225792661.
- Muhammad Uthman El-Muhammady, Asma (2018). "Islam and interfaith dialogue: the da'wah approach of Sayyid Abu al-Hasan al-Nadwi". International Journal of Islamic Thoughts. 7 (1): 27–39. ISSN 2306-7012.
- Mulyadi, Mulyadi (2021). "Integration of Character Education and Tazkiyah al-Nafs: Perspective of Abū Hasan al-Nadwī". ADDIN (in Indonesian). 15 (2): 303–330. doi:10.21043/addin.v15i2.14509. ISSN 2476-9479. S2CID 252725283.
- Mustafa, Muhammad Nasir (2019). "Criticism in Arabic literature: A Study of the Views of Abu-ul-Hassan Alī al-Nadawī". Al-Qamar (in Urdu). 2 (2): 1–14. ISSN 2664-4398.
- Nasir, Mohd Shahrizal; Mat Teh, Kamarul Shukri (2021). "Al-Nadwi's View on the Importance of al-Sirah al-Nabawiyyah in Children's Education". Journal of Quran Sunnah Education & Special Needs (in Malayalam). 5 (1): 227–242. doi:10.33102/jqss.vol5no1.97. ISSN 2590-3799. S2CID 236362753.
- Qayyum, Abdul; Qureshi, Aqeel Ahmad (2021). "Sīrah Writings of Abū al-Ḥassan ʻAlī Nadvī: A Study of "Nabī-i-Rahmat"". Al-Qamar (in Urdu). 4 (2): 205–218. ISSN 2664-4398.
- Rahim, Adibah Abdul; Muhammad, Saud (2021). "Revival of Islamic Civilization: Strategies for the Development of Muslim Society in the Thought of Abul Hasan Ali Nadwi". Journal of Islam in Asia (in Malayalam). 18 (3): 188–204. doi:10.31436/jia.v18i3.1056. ISSN 2289-8077. S2CID 245664809.
- Saadia, Samina; Aziz, Farhat; Awan, Talib Ali (2021). "A Study of Syed Abul Ḥassan Alī Nadvī's views on Orientalists". Al-Qamar (in Urdu). 4 (3): 161–174. doi:10.53762/alqamar.04.03.u13 (inactive 11 July 2025). ISSN 2664-4398.
- Setiawan, Azhari (2017). "Syed Abul Hasan Ali Hasani an-Nadwi About the Collapse of Civilization, View of Life, and Islamic Education". Tasfiyah: Jurnal Pemikiran Islam (in Malayalam). 1 (2): 277–304. doi:10.21111/tasfiyah.v1i2.1854. ISSN 2613-9863.
- Shabana, Razia; Farooq, Fayyaz Ahmad; Rashid, Afifa (2021). "The rise and fall of nations in the light of the thoughts of Syed Abul Hassan Ali Nadvi". Al-Azhār (in Urdu). 7 (1): 111–136. doi:10.46896/alazhr.v7i01.53 (inactive 11 July 2025). ISSN 2519-6707.
- Shawq, Shakir Alam (2013). "As-Sayyid Abu al-Hasan an-Nadwi: Hayatuhu wa Is-hamatuhu al-Ilmiyyah" (PDF). Majallah Al-Qism Al-Arabi. 20: 49–77. ISSN 1991-7015.
- Siddique, Khalil Ahmad; Ali, Muhammed Mumtaz (2019). "The Development of Islamic Thought in Post-Independent India". Journal of Islam in Asia. 16 (2): 348–368. doi:10.31436/jia.v16i2.764. ISSN 2289-8077. S2CID 198703938.
- Timol, Riyaz (2014). "Shaykh Abu al-Hasan Ali Nadwi: His Life & Works". Islam and Christian–Muslim Relations. 25 (4): 538–540. doi:10.1080/09596410.2014.926600. ISSN 0959-6410. S2CID 145231248.
- Yousuf, Abdul Rehman; Marwati, Rafi Ullah Al (2019). "Philosophy And Thought Of Imam Abu Hassan Al-nadawi Towards The Heritage And The Development Of Arabic Literature". Habibia Islamicus (The International Journal of Arabic and Islamic Research) (in Arabic). 3 (1): 139–150. ISSN 2664-4924. Archived from the original on 13 October 2022.
- Zafar, Muhammad Ali (2012). "Seyyed Abul Hassan Ali Nadwi's Approach to Western Civilization" (PDF). Al-Adwa. 37 (27): 9–23. ISSN 1995-7904.
- Zafar, Muhammad Ali (2022). "Seyyed Abul Hassan Ali Nadwi's Way To Deal With Western Development". Pakistan Journal of Linguistics. 4 (1): 27–38. ISSN 2709-7919.
- Zamzam, Ahmad Fahmi (2000). "Abu Al-Hasan Ali Al-Hasani An-Nadwi: Personality, Life History and Struggle". Jurnal Usuluddin (in Malayalam). 11: 79–92. ISSN 0128-0708.

== Newspapers ==
- Aahad (20 November 2016). "Abul Hasan Ali Hasani Nadwi, he World Revivalist of the 20th Century". Republika (in Indonesian). Indonesia.
- Al-Hadawi, Sibgatullah (5 June 2019). "In the memory of writer, preacher Abi Al-Hasan Ali Al-Nadwi". Al Jazeera (in Arabic). Qatar.
- Al Ibrahim, Ibrahim Abdul Razzaq (16 July 2013). "Allama Abu al-Hasan al-Nadawi, may God have mercy on him (1914–1999 AD)". Al Sharq (in Arabic). Qatar.
- Bin Amir, Didar (31 December 2024). "Great reformer and thinker scholar". Desh Rupantor.
- Inqilabi, Mujibur Rahman (20 December 2013). "Academic and literary services of Maulana Syed Abul Hasan Ali Nadwi". Daily Pakistan (in Urdu).
- Khalid Hossain, A F M (12 July 2021). "Nadwi's careful observation in the historical study of orientalists". Daily Naya Diganta (in Bengali). Bangladesh.
- Minhaj Uddin, Muhammad (16 February 2021). "The greatest thinker and spiritual leader of the 20th century: Syed Abul Hasan Ali Nadwi (Rh.)". Dhaka Post.
- Mollah, Abdul Majeed (31 December 2021). "A pioneer of intellectual awakening in the Muslim world". Kaler Kantho (in Bengali). Bangladesh.
- Rabiul Haque, Muhammad (2 December 2020). "Abul Hasan Ali Nadwi, preacher of Muslim Ummah". Jugantor (in Bengali). Bangladesh.
- Rashid, Shamsir Harunur (26 December 2024). "Abul Hasan Ali Nadwi's Educational Thought and the Revival of Muslim Civilization in the Indian Subcontinent". Daily Inqilab.
- Rashid, Shamsir Harunur (2 January 2025). "Abul Hasan Ali Nadwi's Educational Thought and the Revival of Muslim Civilization in the Indian Subcontinent". Daily Inqilab.
- Shah, Syed Talha (21 December 2018). "Remembering Maulana Sayyid Abul Hasan Ali Nadwi". Daily Times. Pakistan.
- Siddiqui, Khaled Saifullah (31 December 2019). "Allama Abul Hasan Ali Nadvi and Bangladesh". Daily Inqilab (in Bengali). Bangladesh.
- Widaningsih (2 June 2021). "Meet Shaykh Abu Al-Hasan Ali An-Nadwi, One of the Best Scholars and Writers of Sirah Nabawiyah". Sindonews.com (in Indonesian). Indonesia.

== Seminars ==
- Ahmad, Nur Farihah; Sulaiman, Mashitah (26 October 2021). The Prominence And Contribution Of Abu Hassan Ali Al-Nadwi On Strengthening The Spread Of Da'wah In Muslim World, 1913–1999. E-Proceedings of the International Conference On Da’wah And Islamic Management. Negeri Sembilan, Malaysia: Universiti Sains Islam Malaysia. Archived from the original on 16 July 2022.

== Websites ==
- "Biography Of Sayyid Abul Hasan Ali Nadwi" (PDF). Abulhasanalinadwi.org.

== Other ==
=== Theses ===
- Ahmed, Mobarok (2012). A study on Arabic prose writers in India with special reference to Maulana Muhammad Rabey Hasani Nadwi (PhD). India: Department of Arabic, Gauhati University. pp. 118–128. hdl:10603/115224.
- Khan, Ghazanfar Ali (2001). Nadwat al-Ulama: a centre of islamic learning (PhD). India: Department of Islamic Studies, Aligarh Muslim University. pp. 114–116. hdl:10603/49833.
- Mujab, Muhammad (2001). Islamic sciences in India and indonesia: a comparative study (PhD). India: Department of Sunni Theology, Aligarh Muslim University. pp. 186–195. hdl:10603/58830.
- S Islam, Ansary (2018). Development of Arabic prose in India from 1947 to 2000 AD (PhD). India: Department of Arabic, Gauhati University. pp. 135–144. hdl:10603/257668.
- Yusuf, Aasia (2014). Islam and Modernism A Study of Muslim Scholars of Indo Pak subcontinent (PhD). India: Department of Islamic Studies, Aligarh Muslim University. pp. 156–168. hdl:10603/70423.

=== Books ===
- Bhat, Samee Ullah (2019). "Chapter 3". Islamic Historiography: Nature and Development. India: Educreation Publishing. pp. 39–74. ISBN 978-93-88910-50-7.
- Euben, Roxanne L.; Zaman, Muhammad Qasim, eds. (31 December 2010). "Chapter 4 Sayyid Abu'l-Hasan 'Ali Nadwi". Sayyid Abu'l-Hasan 'Ali Nadwi. Princeton University Press. pp. 107–128. doi:10.1515/9781400833801-007. ISBN 978-1-4008-3380-1.
- Sikand, Yoginder (2006). "Chapter 5". In Ibrahim M., Abu-Rabi (ed.). The Blackwell companion to contemporary Islamic thought. Malden, MA: Blackwell Publication. pp. 88–105. doi:10.1002/9780470996188.ch6. ISBN 978-1-4051-7848-8. OCLC 150848815.

=== Journals ===
- Aafreedi, Navras J. (2019). "Antisemitism in the Muslim Intellectual Discourse in South Asia". Religions. 10 (7): 8. doi:10.3390/rel10070442. ISSN 2077-1444.
