= Kaleem Siddiqui =

Indian Islamic scholar & preacher (born 1957)

Mawlana Kaleem Siddiqui
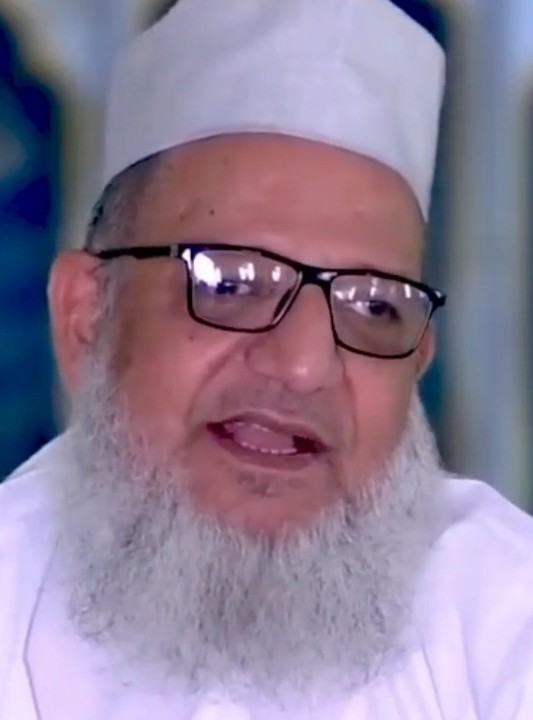
- Kaleem Siddiqui in 2021

Personal life
- Born: 23 September 1957 (age 68) Phulat, Muzaffarnagar, Uttar Pradesh, India
- Education: Darul Uloom Nadwatul Ulama; Meerut College

Religious life
- Religion: Islam

Personal life
- Parents: Haji Muhammad Amin (father); Zubaida Khatun (mother)
- Main interest: Dawah
- Notable works: Jamia Imam Wali Ullah Trust; Global Peace Center

Religious life
- Denomination: Sunni
- Jurisprudence: Hanafi
- Movement: Deobandi

Senior posting
- Disciple of: Zakariyya Kandhlawi; Abul Hasan Ali Hasani Nadwi

Kaleem Siddiqui (born 23 September 1957) is a convicted Indian Islamic preacher, and a member of Tablighi Jamaat. He was detained by ATS of Uttar Pradesh police for mass conversion and later convicted by NIA court in 2024. He is a disciple of Zakariyya Kandhlawi and Abul Hasan Ali Hasani Nadwi.

== Biography ==
He was born on 23 September 1957 in Phulat village of Muzaffarnagar district, Uttar Pradesh, India. His father Haji Muhammad Amin was a Zamindar and murid of Mahmud Hasan Deobandi. His mother's name is Zubaida Khatun. He received his early education at the Faizul Islam Madrasa in phulat, founded by Rashid Ahmad Gangohi, now known as Jamia Imam Wali Ullah. In class V, he memorized first 7 Para of Quran. He passed his higher secondary in science from Pact Inter College. He completed his BSc from Meerut College. He then appeared for the All India Pre Medical Test and finished 57th across India. He later came in contact with Abul Hasan Ali Hasani Nadwi and was admitted to Darul Uloom Nadwatul Ulama to study Islamic subjects. He did not get admission even after getting the opportunity to get admission in MBBS.

He has been the administrator of Jamia Imam Waliullah Islamia, Phulat, Muzaffarnagar, since the 1980s. He is also the president of the Global Peace Center and the Jamia Waliullah Trust.

== Political views ==
In November 2014, Siddiqui remarked that "Indian Prime Minister Narendra Modi, who had faced accusations related to the 2002 Gujarat riots, appeared to be a more mellowed and responsible figure. He noted that Modi's recent statements reflect a change from the earlier controversies of 2002."

== Arrest and conviction ==
In September 2021, the Uttar Pradesh Anti-Terrorism Squad (ATS) arrested Kaleem Siddiqui on charges of being involved in a large-scale religious conversion network. He was accused of illegally forcing people to convert to Islam, and it was alleged that his operations were being conducted through an organized network. The police claimed that this network was receiving funding from abroad, particularly from Gulf countries and the United Kingdom, and that approximately 500,000 people had already been converted to Islam under this scheme.

Siddiqui's arrest received backlash from various sections of the Muslim community. Zafarul Islam Khan described it as a conspiracy, comparing it to the arrest of a major Hindu figure like Shankaracharya. Several Muslim organizations and leaders argued that Siddiqui was being deliberately targeted and that the charges against him were baseless. Students from Aligarh Muslim University (AMU) staged protests against the arrest, while several Muslim organizations demanded his immediate release. Meanwhile, his arrest was praised by Hindu nationalist organizations, which claimed it was an essential step in preventing forced religious conversions. The Uttar Pradesh ATS also conducted raids at multiple locations, including Delhi's Shaheen Bagh, as part of their investigation.

In early April 2023, after having spent over 18 months in police custody, the Allahabad High Court granted him bail. On September 10, 2024, a special NIA court convicted 15/16 individuals, including him and Umar Gautam, for their involvement in a pan-India illegal religious conversion racket. The trial was led by Special Judge Viveka Nand Sharan Tripathi. Afterwards, on September 11, 2024, the NIA-Anti-Terrorist Squad (ATS) court in Lucknow, Uttar Pradesh, issued life sentences to 12 people, including Siddiqui and Gautam.

Osama Idris Nadwi, lawyer for Siddiqui and three others, stated that they will challenge the verdict in the Allahabad High Court. He expressed disappointment, calling the decision based on weak arguments and unrealistic presumptions, with several legal loopholes.

== Books ==
His most popular book is Aapki Amanat Aapki Sewa Mein. His other books include:

- Hume Hidayat Kaise Mili
- Dawat E Deen : Kuch Ghalat Fahmiyaan Kuch Haqaaiq
- Hadiya Dawat
- Tohfah Dawat
- Dawat Fikr O Amal
- Armughaan E Dawat
- Usway Nabi E Rahmat Aur Hamaari Zindagi
- Rafeeq Bano Fareeq Nahi
- Har Marz Ki Dawa Hai Sallay A’laa Muhammad
- Deeni Madaris Aur Hamaari Zimmaydaariyaan
- Naseem Hidayat Kay Jhokay
