= Abu Taher Misbah =

Bangladeshi Islamic scholar and author (born 1956)

Mawlānā Abu Taher Misbah Adib Huzur

Personal details
- Born: 6 March 1956 (age 70) Dhaka
- Education: Jamia Qurania Arabia Lalbagh; Jamia Nooria Islamia; Al Jamia Al Islamia Patiya

Personal life
- Main interests: Hadith; Tasawuf; Education
- Notable idea: Madani Nesab
- Notable work: Madrasatul Madinah

Religious life
- Denomination: Sunni
- Jurisprudence: Hanafi
- Movement: Deobandi

Senior posting
- Disciple of: Abdul Hai Paharpuri; Sultan Zauq Nadvi
- Influenced by: Abul Hasan Ali Hasani Nadwi Taqi Usmani Muhammadullah Hafezzi

Abu Taher Misbah (Bengali: আবু তাহের মিসবাহ; born 6 March 1956), also known as Adib Huzur (Bengali: আদিব হুজুর), is a Bangladeshi Deobandi Islamic scholar, academic, and author. He is the founder of Madani Nesab, and the first textbook that he wrote for it, Eso Arabi Sikhi, is read as the primary textbook of Arabic learning in Bangladesh.

== Early life and education ==
Abu Taher Misbah was born on 6 March 1956. His father's name is Mishbahul Haque. Although his ancestral home was in Comilla, he grew up in Dhaka. After studying at Jamia Qurania Arabia Lalbagh Madrasah, Jamia Nooria Islamia, he completed Dawra-e Hadith (MA) from Al Jamia Al Islamia Patiya in 1977.

== Career ==
He started his career as a teacher at Jamia Islamia Darul Uloom Madania. Later he taught at Jamia Nooria Islamia for about 25 years. While teaching at Nooria Madrasa, he started an education reform movement by publishing the handwritten Arabic magazine Iqra. Later, Madrasatul Madina was established in the light of his thinking.

Since then he started writing experimental textbooks for Madani Nesab. Later, the teaching method he introduced spread throughout the country. The first textbook he wrote for Madani Nesab was Eso Arabi Sikhi, which is read as the primary textbook of Arabic learning in Bangladesh. Other textbooks authored by him include: Ēsō Saraf Śikhi, Ēsō Nāhu Śikhi, Ēsō Bālāgāt Śikhi, Ēsō Fikāh Śikhi, Ēsō Urdu Śikhi, Ēsō Kalam Mērāmat Kari, Islāmkē Jāntē Halē, Āt Tāmrin, Ēsō Tāfsir Śikhi. Ēsō Kōr'ān Śikhi is the first introductory book on the Qur'an for madrasa students in the Indian subcontinent. Al Manar and Al Muzamul Wasit are two modern Arabic-Bengali dictionaries written by him.

In 1992, he founded Madrasatul Madina under the supervision of Abdul Hai Paharpuri in the light of his thinking.

== Literary works ==
He is the founding editor of the Bengali literary periodical Masik Al Qalam (Pushp). In the field of Bengali literature, he has shown a new way to the scholars. Many of his disciples devoted themselves to Bengali literary practice. He translated Abul Hasan Ali Hasani Nadwi's Islam and the World, Saviours of Islamic Spirit, Arkane Arbaa, Al Murtaza, Qasasun Nabiyyin and Taqi Usmani's Legal Status of Following a Madhab, Hadhrat Ameer Mu'awiyah aur Tareekhi Haqa`iq into Bengali. He also translated Guru Dutt Singh Dara's Rasul-e Arabi. His travelogue of Hajj as a young man with Muhammadullah Hafezzi, Baitullah's Musafir, Aso Kalam meramat Kari, In Search of Turkistan in Turkey, etc., are his outstanding creations in Bengali literature. The Child Aqeedah series, Child Seerat series, etc., are notable additions to his children's literature.

=== Textbook ===
- Eso Arbi Shiki
- Eso Sarf Shiki
- Eso Nahb Shiki
- Eso Quran Shiki
- Eso Fiqh Shiki
- Eso Balagat Shiki
- Eso Urdu Shiki
- Eso Tafsir Shiki
- Islam ke Jante Hole
- At Tamarin Al Kitabee Ala Tarequ Ilal Arabiyyah

=== Bengali literature ===
- Musafir of Baitullah
- Let me repair the pen
- In the shadow of Baitullah
- In search of Turkestan in Turkey
- Listen to the compassionate gardener
- Talebane Ilm Rahe Manzil

=== Arabic literature ===
- Tafsirul Quranul Karim

=== Translation literature ===
- Accept Your Deposit
- Love You O Prophet
- Islam and the World
- Taleb Ilm is the Path of Life
- Kasasun Nabiyin
- Saviours of Islamic Spirit
- Arkane Arbaa
- Gift of the East
- Life and mission of Maulana Mohammad Ilyas
- Hazrat Muabiya RA in history
- My Memories - Some Happy, Some Sad
- What is madhhab and why?
- Maqame Sahaba and Karamate Sahaba
- Duhal Islam

=== Dictionary ===
- Al Manar (Bengali-Arabic)
- Al Muzamul Wasit (Arabic-Bengali)

=== Editing ===
- Taisirul Fikhil Muassar
- Repentance is the reality of forgiveness
- Full of flowers
- Al-Hidayah
- Hayate Muhaddis Rah.
- The light of Hadith is the path of life

=== Child Aqeedah Series 1 to 10 ===
- Allah
- Prophet And Messenger
- Heavenly Book
- The Angel
- First Man
- Heaven
- In Hell
- Doomsday
- Final Judgment
- Mud House

=== Child Seerat Series 1 to 10 ===
- Prophet in Mecca
- Prophet in Medina
- Prophet in the field of Jihad 1
- Prophet in the field of Jihad 2
- Nabiji was like that 1
- Nabiji was like that 2
- The Prophet loved you
- Nabi's Muʿjiza
- Prophet said
- Prophet in the eyes of non-Muslims

== Legacy ==
The British Association of Teachers of Arabic hosted their 3rd Annual International Conference at the University of Manchester. The conference was titled "Shaykh Abū Ṭāher Miṣbāḥ: A Man Who Inspired Thousands to Master Arabic in Bangladesh" and was presented by Mahfuj Ahmed on 6 and 7 July 2023, in the United Kingdom.

== See more ==
- List of Deobandis
