= Islami Bishwakosh =

Islamic foundation in Bangladesh

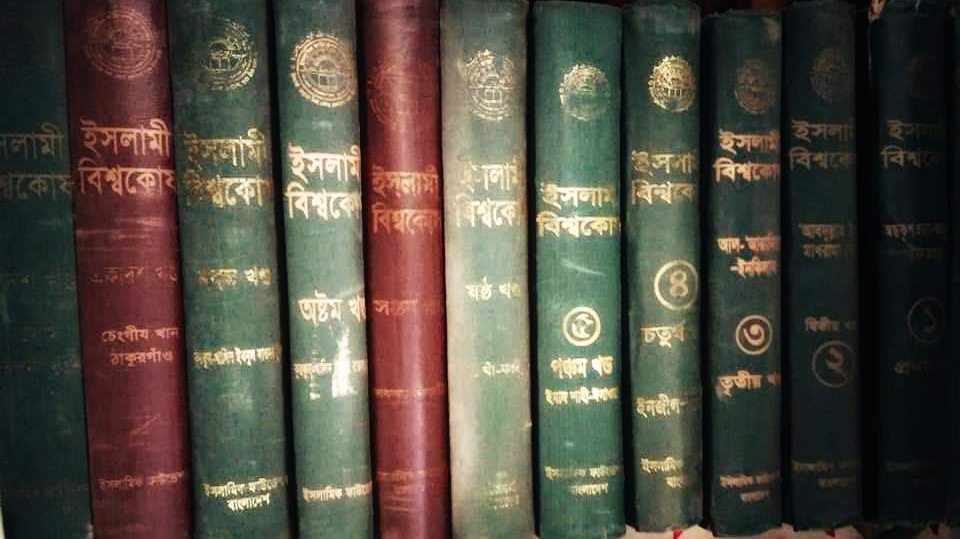
- Author: Abdul Haque Faridi; Muhammad Shahidullah; Abu Saeed Muhammad Omar Ali; A F M Khalid Hossain
- Original title: ইসলামী বিশ্বকোষ
- Language: Bengali
- Subject: Islam
- Genre: Encyclopedia
- Publisher: Islamic Foundation Bangladesh
- Publication place: Bangladesh
- Media type: Book, PDF
- Followed by: Sirat Bishwakosh

Islami Bishwakosh (Bengali: ইসলামী বিশ্বকোষ, romanized: Islāmī Bishshokōsh, lit. 'Islamic encyclopedia') is an encyclopedia published by the Islamic Foundation Bangladesh. It is of 25 volumes and also a concise version. The project's leading founder was Abdul Haque Faridi, a Bangladeshi educator and scholar.

== History ==
The first Islami Bishwakosh of Bangladesh project was launched by Bangla Academy. Dr Muhammad Shahidullah served as an editor for the project for a while. In 1958, the Shorter Encyclopedia of Islam was published from Leiden and it was a translation. Work on the encyclopedia was later passed on to the Islamic Foundation Bangladesh for a number of reasons, from which it was later edited and published.

Whilst Abdul Haque Faridi was president of the encyclopedia's editorial board, 18 volumes were completed during his lifetime.

After the independence of Bangladesh in 1971, Islami Bishwakosh was one of the three specialised encyclopedias that were published. Dr A F M Khalid Hossain edited volumes 3 to 9 of the encyclopedia's second edition.
