= Osama Idris Nadwi =

Indian Islamic scholar, lawyer, and politician (b. 1994)

Advocate, Mufti Osama Idrīs Nadwi
- Born: 1 January 1994 (age 32); Phulat, Muzaffarnagar district, Uttar Pradesh
- Education: Darul Uloom Nadwatul Ulama; Al Mahadul Aali Al Islami, Hyderabad; Glocal University
- Occupations: Islamic scholar, lawyer, social worker, politician
- Political party: All India Majlis-e-Ittehadul Muslimeen (AIMIM)
- Awards: Nishān-e-I'tirāf (2023) (AIMPLB)

Osama Idrīs Nadwi (born 1 January 1994), also written as Mufti Osama Nadwi, is an Islamic scholar, lawyer, social activist, and politician. He is recognized for his exceptional efforts in protecting the rights of Muslims and addressing social issues.

== Early life and education ==
Osama Idrīs Nadwi was born on 1 January 1994, in Phulat, Muzaffarnagar district. His Rasm-e-Bismillah (initiation into reading the Quran) was conducted in 1996 by Kaleem Siddiqui. He completed his primary education at Jamia Imam Shah Waliullah, Phulat, and graduated as an Aalim from Darul Uloom Nadwatul Ulama, Lucknow, in 2012. Subsequently, he specialized in Islamic jurisprudence (Takhassus fil Fiqh wal Ifta) at Al Mahadul Aali Al Islami, Hyderabad and authored a research thesis titled Cyber Jaraim aur Islami Nuqta-e-Nazar (transl. Cyber Crimes and the Islamic Perspective).

Following this, on the advice of Khalid Saifullah Rahmani, he pursued an LLB degree from Glocal University, Saharanpur.

== Career ==
Nadwi chose the legal profession as a means to serve the community. He has worked extensively on securing bail and the release of prisoners, providing legal guidance to the public, and offering free legal advice to those in need. He also serves as the legal counsel for Kaleem Siddiqui.

Nadwi has played a significant role in strengthening the organizational structure of the All India Majlis-e-Ittehadul Muslimeen (AIMIM) in western Uttar Pradesh. He has served as the President of Muzaffarnagar district (thrice), former President of Saharanpur Division, and former Provincial Vice President and General Secretary of western UP.

In October 2026, Nadwi was appointed president of the AIMIM's legal cell in Uttar Pradesh by party president Asaduddin Owaisi.

== Awards and honours ==
In recognition of his contributions, Nadwi was honored with several awards, including the Nishān-e-I'tirāf by the All India Muslim Personal Law Board in December 2023.

He has also published articles and presented papers at seminars.

== Views ==
In March 2025, Nadwi commented on public criticism of Indian cricketer Mohammed Shami for not fasting during the Islamic month of Ramadan while playing in an international cricket match. Citing provisions in the Quran that permit travellers to postpone fasting (Qur'an 2:184–185), he stated that Shami, being on a journey exceeding 92.5 km, was religiously permitted to abstain from fasting without being sinful. Nadwi argued that the matter was between Shami and Allah, and that public condemnation without knowing the circumstances was inappropriate. He added that such statements by religious leaders for publicity could harm both Islam and the Muslim community.

In July 2025, Nadwi commented on the application of Qisas (retributive justice) in Islamic law during discussions surrounding the case of Indian nurse Nimisha Priya, who was sentenced to death in Yemen for murder. He explained that Qisas—derived from the Quran (Surah Al-Baqarah, 2:178)—mandates equal retaliation in cases of intentional harm, such as "an eye for an eye" or "a life for a life", and applies equally to men and women. Nadwi further noted that Islamic law allows for clemency through afw (pardon) or diyyah (blood money), but only at the discretion of the victim’s family. He added that while gender equality in punishment is maintained, certain compassionate considerations—such as for nursing mothers—may influence the timing of punishment under Sharia-based legal systems.
