= A F M Khalid Hossain =

Bangladeshi Islamic scholar

DPhil Abul Fayez Muhammad Khalid Hossain
- আবুল ফয়েজ মুহাম্মদ খালিদ হোসেন
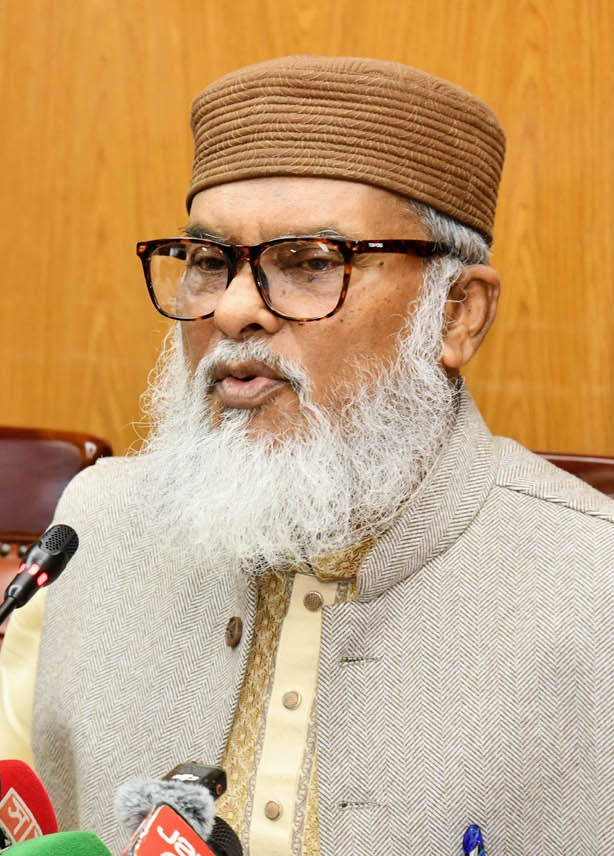
- Hossain in 2025

Adviser for Religious Affairs
- In office 8 August 2024 – 17 February 2026
- President: Mohammed Shahabuddin
- Chief Adviser: Muhammad Yunus
- Preceded by: Faridul Haq Khan

Personal details
- Born: 2 February 1959 (age 67) Satkania, East Pakistan
- Party: Islami Andolan Bangladesh
- Education: Al Jamia Al Islamia Patiya; University of Chittagong

Personal life
- Parent: Muhammad Habibullah (father)
- Main interests: History of Islam; Pan-Islamism
- Notable work: Islamic Encyclopedia
- Website: www.afmkhalid.com

Religious life
- Denomination: Sunni
- Jurisprudence: Hanafi
- Movement: Deobandi

Senior posting
- Teacher: Abdul Halim Bukhari
- Disciple of: Shah Ahmad Shafi; Jamir Uddin Nanupuri; Zulfiqar Ahmad Naqshbandi

Abul Fayez Muhammad Khalid Hossain (popularly known as Dr. A F M Khalid Hossain, born 2 February 1959) is a Bangladeshi Islamic scholar. He served as the Adviser for Religious Affairs in the Yunus interim government. His appointment marks the first time an Islamic scholar has held this advisory role in Bangladesh. He is also the Vice President of Hefazat-e-Islam Bangladesh and serves as the Education Adviser for Islami Andolan Bangladesh. He previously held the position of President of Islami Chhatra Samaj, the student wing of the Nizam-e-Islam Party. In academia, he is a visiting professor at the International Islamic University Chittagong and has previously served as an adjunct professor at the Asian University of Bangladesh. He was also the head of the Department of Islamic History and Culture at Omargani M.E.S. College. His editorial roles include serving as the editor of the monthly journal At-Tawheed and assistant editor of Balagh al-Sharq. He serves as a columnist for four national newspapers and has authored over two hundred research articles in a range of journals, including The Muslim World League Journal. He has published 20 books and was a key figure in editing volumes 3 to 9 of the second edition of the Islami Bishwakosh and the Sirat Encyclopedia, both published by the Islamic Foundation Bangladesh.

== Biography ==
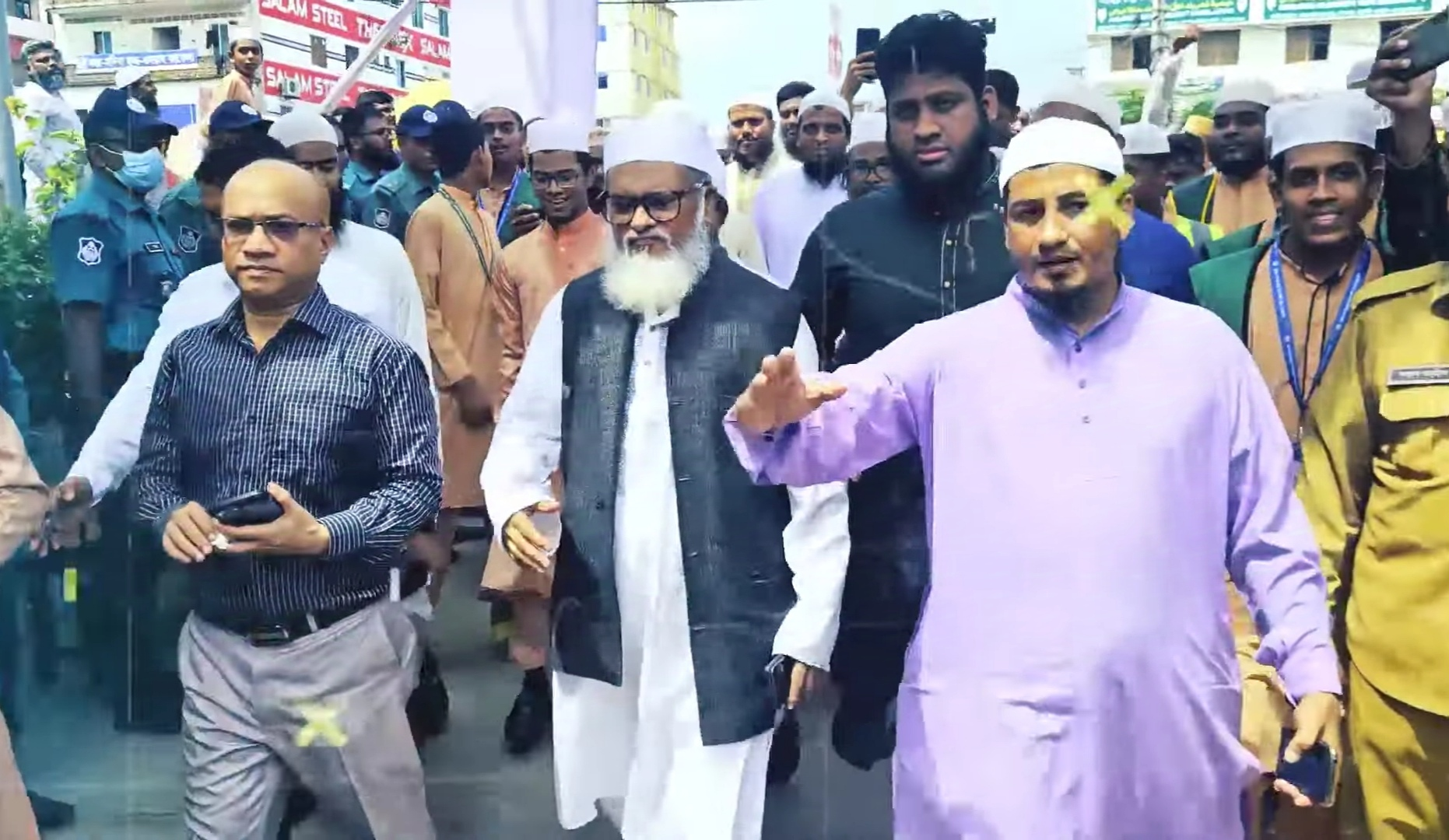
Khalid Hossain's Visit to Al-Markazul Islami As-Salafi, Rajshahi.

Khalid Hossain, born on 2 February 1959 in Madarsha Union, Satkania Upazila of Chittagong District, hails from a Bengali Muslim family, with his father, Muhammad Habibullah, being an Islamic scholar. He began his education at Babunagar Government Primary School, where he studied until class three. Between 1969 and 1971, he attended Al Jamia Al Islamia Patiya and completed his Alim in 1971, followed by a Fazil degree in 1973, achieving first class at Satkania Mahmudul Uloom Alia Madrasa. From 1973 to 1975, he studied Hadith at Chittagong Chandanpura Darul Uloom and later obtained his Kamil degree from the Bangladesh Madrasah Education Board in 1975. His religious education included studying various Islamic texts: Sahih al-Bukhari under the guidance of Muhammad Amin, a disciple of Ashraf Ali Thanwi; Sahih Muslim with Matiur Rahman Nizami of Mirsharai; Sunan al-Tirmidhi with Ismail Arakani Qasemi; and Sunan Abi Dawud under Nawab Hasan Qasemi. In 1982, he obtained a Bachelor of Arts (Honors) in Islamic History and Culture from the University of Chittagong, followed by a Master of Arts in the same field in 1983. He earned a Ph.D. in 2006 from the University of Chittagong, focusing on The Sermons of the Prophet Muhammad: A Socio-cultural Study. His teachers included Abdul Halim Bukhari, and he also became a disciple of Jamir Uddin Nanupuri, Shah Ahmad Shafi, and Zulfiqar Ahmad Naqshbandi in Sufism.

He began his professional career in 1987 as a lecturer in Arabic language and literature at Satkania Alia Mahmudul Uloom Fazil Madrasa. From 1992 until January 2019, he served as a professor and head of the Department of Islamic History and Culture at Omargani M.E.S. College. He has been the editor of the monthly religious and literary magazine At-Tawheed, published by Al Jamia Al Islamia Patiya since 2007, and has also served as the Khatib of Hazrat Uthman Jame Mosque in Halishahar A-Block and a teacher at Al Jamiyatul Arbiyatul Islamia Ziri. In addition to his academic roles, he has worked as an adjunct professor at the Asian University of Bangladesh and has taught in various capacities at institutions such as Al Jamia Al Islamia Patiya and Jamia Darul Ma'arif Al-Islamia. During his student years (1973–1984), he worked as a correspondent for several newspapers, including Daily Sangbad, Daily Banglar Bani, The Bangladesh Times, and The New Nation. On 2 January 2021, he was appointed as the Education Adviser for Islami Andolan Bangladesh. He was later elected vice-president of Hefazat-e-Islam Bangladesh on 31 August 2023. On 8 July 2023, he was appointed as a visiting professor in the Department of Quranic Sciences and Islamic Studies at the International Islamic University Chittagong. Following the political changes in 2024, after the fall of Sheikh Hasina's government and the formation of an interim government led by Muhammad Yunus, Hossain was appointed as an Adviser for Religious Affairs, taking office on 8 August 2024.

== Literary works ==
Debut cover of Khatib-e Azam Hazrat Maulana Siddique Ahmad, published by Chintadhara Publications

Khalid Hossain's first article, The Life and Work of Hazrat Umar Farooq (RA), was published by At-Tawheed. Currently, he serves as the editor of At-Tawheed and assistant editor of the Arabic magazine Balag al-Sharq, both produced by Al Jamia Al Islamia Patiya. He also writes regularly for four national newspapers. His editorial work includes multiple volumes of the second edition of the Islami Bishwakosh and the Sirat encyclopedia, both published by Islamic Foundation Bangladesh. Additionally, he is involved in verifying the authenticity of Zulfiqar Ahmad Naqshbandi's Bengali translation. In 1989, he authored Khatib-e-Azam Maulana Siddique Ahmad: The Source of a Revolution and has published over 20 books. His translation projects include Maslak-e Ulama-e-Deoband, Muslims in India, and Karwan-e-Zindagi (Volume 3). His edited works feature Sirat-e Ayesha (Ra.), Rise of Global Islam, Aso Nari Porda Kori, and Prayers for Men and Women, while his compilations include Nive Jawa Dipshikha and Selected Essays-1. His latest publication, Islamic Regulations, was released on 15 February 2025, with its cover formally unveiled by Faruk-e-Azam at an event in Dhaka.

== See also ==
- List of Deobandis
