= Abu Saeed Muhammad Omar Ali =

Bangladeshi Islamic scholar, author and translator

Mawlana Abu Saeed Muhammad Omar Ali
- আবু সাঈদ মুহাম্মদ ওমর আলী

Personal life
- Born: 1 October 1945 Qabilnagar, Chuadanga, Nadia district, Bengal Province
- Died: 14 August 2010 (aged 64)
- Education: University of Dhaka; Pabna Alia Madrasa; Quwwatul Islam Alia Madrasa; Qabilnagar Madrasa

Religious life
- Religion: Islam
- Denomination: Sunni
- Jurisprudence: Hanafi

Muslim leader
- Disciple of: Abul Hasan Ali Hasani Nadwi
- Influenced by: Mushahid Ahmad Bayampuri

Abu Saeed Muhammad Omar Ali (Bengali: আবু সাঈদ মুহাম্মদ ওমর আলী; 1 October 1945 — 14 August 2010) was a Bangladeshi Islamic scholar, author, teacher, and translator. As a member of the Islamic Foundation's encyclopedia project's board of directors and editing board, his most notable works are Islami Bishwakosh (25 volumes), Sirat Bishwakosh (14 volumes) and Al-Quran Bishwakosh. He was also the editor of the Hakkatha and Islamic Foundation Magazine. Ali became acquainted with Abul Hasan Ali Hasani Nadwi after translating his books, and later became one of his senior disciples and his principal Bengali commentator.

== Early life and education ==
Ali was born on 1 October 1945 to a Bengali Muslim family of Mandals in the village of Qabilnagar in Chuadanga, then under the Nadia district of British Bengal. His mother, Nekjan Nesa, was housewife. Ali's father, Mufazzal Husayn Mandal, was enthusiastic about Islamic education and enrolled him at the local Qabilnagar Nasrul Uloom Madrasa following spending some years at the Taluqkarra Primary School. Ali became a student at the Quwwatul Islam Alia Madrasa of Kushtia where he passed his fazil certificate in 1965. He then studied at the Pabna Alia Madrasa where he graduated with a kamil in Hadith studies in 1967. He would complete a BA in political science in 1974 and MA in 1975 at the University of Dhaka. During his student life, he was associated with the Tamaddun Majlish.

== Career ==
After completing his Islamic education in 1967, Ali began his career as a teacher at the Barishkhali High School and Pardakhalpur K. B. Academy in Harinakunda, Jhenaidah for two and a half years. He then joined the Abudharr Ghifari College in Malibagh serving under Dewan Mohammad Azraf for 10 months. After that, he returned to his former school, the Qabilnagar Madrasa, where he served as principal for a short while.

Following his graduation from Dhaka University in 1975, Ali joined the Islamic Foundation. After that, he served as a professor at Abdul Hamid Khan Bhashani's Santosh Islamic University in Tangail. During that time, he was also the editor of the Hakkatha magazine in 1978. After that, Ali returned to Dhaka and continued to work at the Islamic Foundation and be the khatib of Abudharr Ghifari Complex Jame Mosque. He has also led Eid prayers at the Baitul Mukarram National Mosque and established numerous mosques and madrasas in the country. Ali used to regularly give dawah to Islam and appear on radio and television since 1990.

=== As Nadwi's Bengali commentator ===
Ali became acquainted with Indian Islamic scholar Abul Hasan Ali Hasani Nadwi through his translation of Nadwi's work into Bengali with the title Iman Jokhon Jaglo. The book's sophisticated language and lofty thinking had an effect on him. After publishing it, Ali translated another book of Nadwi's, Saviours of Islamic Spirit, which was published by the Islamic Foundation as Islami Renesãr Ogropothik. In 1984, Nadwi visited Bangladesh and Ali pledged bay'ah to him. He also spent iʿtikāf with Nadwi during Ramadan. This is how Ali became one of the senior disciples of Nadwi and his principal Bengali commentator. Along with Islam and the World, he translated many of Nadwi's books whilst preserving the original essence and accurate expressions of Nadwi's emotions.

=== Works ===
Ali was the editor of the Hakkata and Islamic Foundation Magazine. Although he has many of his own books, he is best known as a translator due to his proficiency in Arabic, Persian and Urdu. His literary career began with the translation of Mushahid Ahmad Bayampuri's 'al-Fatḥ al-Karīm fī Siyāsah an-Nabī al-Amīn from Urdu to Bengali. His most notable works are the 25-volume Islami Bishwakosh, 14-volume Sirat Bishwakosh and Al-Quran Bishwakosh which were published by the Islamic Foundation Bangladesh. He has translated 15 books and written two children's books. Some of his translated works are:

1. Musôlmander Pôtône Biśśô Kī Haralo? (What did the world lose in the fall of Muslims?)
2. Īman Jôkhôn Jaglo (When Faith Awakened)
3. Nôbīye Rôhmôt (Prophet of Mercy)
4. Sôngramī Sadhôker Itihas (History of Struggling Saints)
5. Islamer Raśṭrīyô O Ôrthônoitik Uttôradhikar (Islam's political and economic inheritance)
6. Môhanôbī (S.) Er Prôtirôkkha Koushôl (Self-Defence Technique of the Great Prophet Sw)
7. Khālid bin Walīd (Khalid ibn al-Walid)
8. Muḥammad bin Qāsim (Muhammad ibn al-Qasim)
9. Amar Amma (My Mother)
10. Sīrate Rasūle Akram (Biography of the Noble Prophet)
11. Sīrate Soiyôd Ahmôd Shôhīd (Biography of Sayyid Ahmad Shahid)
12. Praccer Upôhar (Gift of the Orient)
13. Islam Dhôrmô Sômaj Sôngskriti (Religion of Islam is Reformation of Society)
14. Hôzrôt Abu Bôkôr Siddīq (Ra.) Jībôn O Sôngram (Life and Struggles of Hazrat Abu Bakr Siddiq Ra)

== Death and legacy ==
Ali died on 14 August 2010 during the month of Ramadan. His janaza was performed the next day, and he was buried next to the Qabilnagar Mosque which he had established. Ali was married to Begum Zaibunnesa, with whom he had four daughters and one son.

== See also ==
- List of Deobandis
