= Abdul Haque Faridi =

Bangladeshi academic

- আবদুল হক ফরিদী

President of Bangla Academy
- In office 14 July 1980 – 13 July 1982
- Preceded by: Syed Ali Ahsan
- Succeeded by: Abu Mohammed Habibullah

Personal details
- Born: 25 May 1903 Paikapara, Naria Thana, Faridpur District, Bengal Presidency (now in Shariatpur District, Bangladesh)
- Died: 5 February 1996 (aged 92) Dhaka, Bangladesh
- Children: Ataul Haque
- Parents: Abu Abdul Haque (father); Umm Abdul Haque (mother)
- Education: Dhaka University; University of Leeds; University of Illinois at Urbana–Champaign
- Occupation: Lecturer, educationist, author
- Known for: Islami Bishwakosh
- Awards: Bangla Academy Fellowship

Abul Faraḥ Muḥammad Abdul Ḥaque Farīdī (25 May 1903 – 5 February 1996) was a Bangladeshi educator and author. In recognition of his contributions in the field of linguistics, he was awarded a Bangla Academy Fellowship. Faridi was the founder of Islamic Foundation Bangladesh's Islami Bishwakosh (Islamic encyclopedia) project and also worked closely with Bangladesh Scouts.

== Early life and education ==
Abdul Haque Faridi was born on 25 May 1903 in Paikpara, Naria, which was a part of the Faridpur district at the time (now in Shariatpur District). After receiving his primary education from a rural maktab, he was admitted to a reformed (or new scheme) madrasa, passed the entrance examination in 1923, and subsequently the Islamic intermediate in 1925. In both examinations, Faridi was one of the highest-scoring students in Bengal. He received a Bachelor of Science in 1928 from the Islamic Studies Department of the University of Dhaka and a master's degree in 1929. In 1933, he was awarded a first-class Master of Arts degree in Persian literature while still in the government workplace. He later earned a Diploma in Education from the University of Leeds and an Advanced Certificate in Education Administration from the University of Illinois at Urbana-Champaign in the United States.

== Career ==
Faridi started his career as a lecturer at the Chittagong College and later promoted to Educational Service, he served as the Assistant School Inspector of Muslim Education in Burdwan. He was also the first president of the Anjuman Mufidul Islam from 1947 to 1949. He then retired as Director of Public Education in East Pakistan in 1966. After his retirement, Faridi served as Honorary Treasurer of Dhaka University for 6 years and also its acting vice-chancellor for some time.

Working closely with Islamic Foundation Bangladesh, Faridi translated many books. In 1976, he wrote a book on madrasa education titled Madrasa Shikkha: Bangladesh. Faridi was appointed Director General of Islamic Foundation Bangladesh in October 1977 for two years. Faridi became the leading founder of the foundation's Islami Bishwakosh project, a 25-volume Islamic encyclopedia which would also have a concise version. As president of the encyclopedia's editorial board, 18 volumes were completed during Faridi's lifetime.

== Death and legacy ==
Abdul Haque Faridi died on 5 February 1996 in Dhaka. His son, Ataul Haque, served as the Cabinet Secretary of Bangladesh from 18 January 1997 until 13 December 1998.
