= Seerat-i-Sayyid Ahmad Shaheed =

1939 book by Abul Hasan Ali Hasani Nadwi

- Cover of Urdu Version
- Author: Abul Hasan Ali Hasani Nadwi
- Original title: سیرت سید احمد شہیدؒ
- Translator: Abu Saeed Muhammad Omar Ali (Bengali)
- Language: Urdu
- Subject: Syed Ahmad Barelvi
- Publication date: 1939
- Publication place: India
- Media type: Hardcover
- Pages: 1176
- OCLC: 44756707
- Dewey Decimal: 297.09
- LC Class: DS476.2.S29 N3 1974
- Website: abulhasanalinadwi.org

Seerat-i-Sayyid Ahmad Shaheed (Urdu: سیرت سید احمد شہیدؒ) is the first historical biography of Syed Ahmad Barelvi, originally written in Urdu by Abul Hasan Ali Hasani Nadwi. He wrote the book at the age of 24. The book had two volumes. The first volume had 125 chapters and 588 pages. The second volume had 150 chapters and 588 pages. It contains a detailed account of the life and mission of Syed Ahmad Shahid. The book was written in 1939.

== Description ==
Nadwi's first literary endeavor and debut as a historian was his historical biography entitled, Seerat-i-Sayyid Ahmad Shaheed written in 1938-39 C.E. Earlier he had also published an article on Ahmad Shaheed in Arabic Journal Al-Manar during 1931 C.E. The book is a memoir of life, works and achievements of the founder of the greatest revivalist movement known to Indian history. It is the comprehensive, well-researched and documenting the vast material existing on the subject. The author claims,

Fortunately, I have also had the advantage of having access to certain original sources, not available to others, and also the opportunity to study the life and mission of Sayyid Ahmad Shaheed from close quarters. I had, therefore, been giving thought to the matter from comparatively early age and also written a monograph on the subject.

—

Therefore, utilizing all existing sources on the subject to produce a worthy work to understand the real worth and value of Sayyid Ahmad Shaheed's movement and the place he occupied among the luminaries of Islam. The book made an instant success and received wide acclaim, both within and abroad. The way this book was received was an indication of the popularity of Sayyid Ahmad Shaheed and the urge of the people to know more about him. Political situation prevailing in India then had created an upsurge in the Muslims, who were eager to reclaim their identity and to see Islam strong and powerful in the world. Naturally, the Sayyid Ahmad's message of hope and faith, of self-confidence and self-realization, contained in the book, was enthusiastically welcomed by them. Nadwi's book and other related writing on Sayyid Ahmad Shaheed, in addition, proved to be a refutation and cleared many misconceptions about Sayyid Ahmad and his movement disseminated by some western writers, such as Peter Hardy, The Muslims of British India. William Wilson Hunter, Indian Musalmans and some apologetic writers. As Nadwi claims:

I drew attention to and protested against the biased and extremely intolerant attitude of the western writers, in regard to the Sayyid Ahmad and his mission. I tried to show that dearth of material was not the cause of their partisan and unwarranted observation, as it so often happens in depicting the true character and achievements of the reformers of the old. For, in such cases, the writers usually exercise their whimsical speculations to present a character sketch.

—

But according to Nadwi, it seems that the chroniclers never wanted to ascertain true facts; they gave credence to every groundless rumour without evaluating the relative evidential value of the report reaching them. Therefore, on their part it was sheer shadow of narrow-spiritual charitableness bequeathed by the crusades, which was not expected of the present age persons professing to be rationalists.
