= Shah Muhammad Nazrul Islam =

Bangladeshi Islamic scholar (born 1971)

- শাহ মুহাম্মদ নজরুল ইসলাম
- Islamic scholar and government official
- Born: 1971 (age 54–55); Baniyachong, Habiganj, Bangladesh
- Occupations: Islamic scholar, author, researcher, government official
- Organization: Islamic Foundation Bangladesh
- Known for: Islamic literature, Imam training programs, administrative roles

Shah Muhammad Nazrul Islam (born 1971) is a Bangladeshi Islamic scholar, author, researcher and government official. He serves as the Deputy Director (Administration) at the Imam Training Academy of Islamic Foundation Bangladesh. Concurrently, he also holds the position of Central General Secretary of the Bangladesh Jatiya Imam Samity (Bangladesh National Imam Association).

== Early life and education ==
Shah Muhammad Nazrul Islam was born in 1971 in Hiyala village under Baniyachong Upazila of Habiganj District, Bangladesh.

He received his education in both the Qawmi and Alia streams of Islamic religious education. He completed his Dawrah e Hadith (equivalent to a Master's degree) from Jamia Islamia Husainia Gaharpur. Later, he obtained his Kamil degree from Sylhet Government Alia Madrasah. In addition to his religious education, he earned his Bachelor of Arts (BA) and Master of Arts (MA) degrees from the National University.

== Career ==
Shah Muhammad Nazrul Islam began his career through teaching and Islamic training initiatives. He has served in various key administrative and training positions within Islamic Foundation Bangladesh, including:

- Trainer at the Imam Training Academy
- Deputy Director of the Imam Training Academy, Sylhet regional center
- Deputy Director of the Islamic Foundation, Habiganj district office

During his tenure in Sylhet, Shah Muhammad Nazrul Islam received appreciation for rooftop gardening at a government institutional building. The rooftop garden was featured for its scenic appearance and contribution to improving the institutional environment.

Since September 2025, he has been serving as the Deputy Director (Administration) at the head office of the Imam Training Academy, Islamic Foundation Bangladesh.

== Organizational and social activities ==
As the Central General Secretary of the Bangladesh Jatiya Imam Samity, he leads nationwide welfare and Islamic Dawah activities for Imams. He frequently participates as a key speaker in various religious training programs, national seminars, and Islamic Dawah programs. He also served as the former Central President of the Quran education board, Anjuman-e-Talimul Quran Bangladesh.

He is also actively involved in social work and human rights awareness programs, particularly focusing on preventing violence against women and children from a religious perspective. In an opinion-sharing meeting organized by World Vision, he stated, "Taking a stand against the oppression of women and children is a part of worship." As part of his organizational duties, he also met with the former Prime Minister of Bangladesh, Begum Khaleda Zia.

== Publications ==
He has authored more than 40 books covering Islamic education, social policies, the life of the Prophet, and women's and children's rights. Some of his notable books include:

- Shishur Upohar : Amar Chotobela (A Child's Gift: My Childhood)
- Narir Economic Security o Morjadar Protik Mohor (Dower: The Symbol of Economic Security and Dignity for Women)
- Hajj o Umrah (Hajj and Umrah)
- Nobi Jiboner Adorsho (Ideals of the Prophet's Life)
- Jibonto Namaz (Living Prayers)
