= Abul Hasan Ali Hasani Nadwi =

Indian islamic scholar (1913 – 1999)

7th Chancellor of Darul Uloom Nadwatul Ulama
- In office 1961 – 31 December 1999
- Preceded by: Abdul Ali Hasani
- Succeeded by: Rabey Hasani Nadwi

Personal details
- Born: 5 December 1913 Takia Kalan, Raebareli, United Provinces of Agra and Oudh, British India
- Died: 31 December 1999 (aged 86) Takia Kalan, Raebareli district, Uttar Pradesh, India
- Education: Darul Uloom Nadwatul Ulama; Darul Uloom Deoband; University of Lucknow

Personal life
- Parent: Abdul Hayy Hasani (father)
- Main interest(s): History, Biography, Islamic revivalism, Islam in India
- Notable works: Seerat-i-Sayyid Ahmad Shaheed (1939); Life and mission of Maulana Mohammad Ilyas (1945); Islam and the World (1951); Muslims in India (1953); Saviours of Islamic Spirit (1955–1984); Karwan-e-Zindagi (1983–1999); Glory of Iqbal (1973)
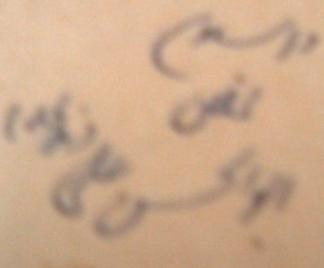
- Signature
- Website: abulhasanalinadwi.org

Religious life
- Religion: Islam
- Denomination: Sunni
- Founder of: Academy of Islamic Research & Publications
- Jurisprudence: Hanafi
- Movement: Nadwatul Ulama; Deobandi movement Tablighi Jama'at

Muslim leader
- Disciples: Abu Saeed Muhammad Omar Ali, Abdullah Hasani Nadwi, Akram Nadwi
- Influenced by: Shibli Nomani, Muhammad Iqbal, Ilyas Kandhlawi, Abdul Qadir Raipuri, Hussain Ahmad Madani, Muhammad Taqi-ud-Din al-Hilali, Ahmed Ali Lahori, Zakariyya Kandhlawi
- Influenced: Yusuf al-Qaradawi, Rabey Hasani Nadwi, Mohammad Akram Nadwi, Sultan Zauq Nadvi, Wazeh Rashid Hasani Nadwi, Shafiqur Rahman Nadwi, Kaleem Siddiqui, Abu Taher Misbah, Bilal Abdul Hai Hasani Nadwi
- Awards: King Faisal International Prize (1980); D.Litt. by University of Kashmir (1981); Sultan of Brunei International Prize (1999); Dubai International Holy Quran Award (1999)

Syed Abul Hasan Ali Hasani Nadwi (also known as Ali Miyan; 5 December 1913 – 31 December 1999) was a leading Indian Islamic scholar, thinker, writer, preacher, reformer and a Muslim public intellectual of 20th century India and the author of numerous books on history, biography, contemporary Islam, and the Muslim community in India, one of the most prominent figure of Deoband School. His teachings covered the entire spectrum of the collective existence of the Muslim Indians as a living community in the national and international context. Due to his command over Arabic, in writings and speeches, he had a wide area of influence extending far beyond the Sub-continent, particularly in the Arab World. During 1950s and 1960s he stringently attacked Arab nationalism and pan-Arabism as a new Jahiliyyah and promoted pan-Islamism. He began his academic career in 1934 as a teacher in Nadwatul Ulama, later in 1961; he became Chancellor of Nadwa and in 1985, he was appointed as Chairman of Oxford Centre for Islamic Studies.

He had a lifelong association with Tablighi Jamaat. For decades, he enjoyed universal respect, was accepted by the non-Muslims, at the highest level, as the legitimate spokesman for the concerns and aspirations of the entire Muslim community. Islam and the World is the much acclaimed book of Nadwi for which he received accolades throughout, especially Arab world where it was first published in 1951. His books are part of syllabic studies in various Arab Universities. In 1951, during his second Hajj, the key-bearer of the Kaaba, opened its door for two days and allowed him to take anyone he chose inside. He was the first Alim from India who was given the key to Kaaba by the Royal Family of Saudi Arabia to allow him to enter whenever he chose during his pilgrimage. He was the chairman of Executive Committee of Darul Uloom Deoband and president of All India Muslim Personal Law Board. He was the founder of Payam-e-Insaniyaat Movement and co-founder of All India Muslim Majlis-e-Mushawarat and Academy of Islamic Research & Publications. Internationally recognised, he was one of the Founding Members of the Muslim World League and served on the Higher Council of the Islamic University of Madinah, the executive committee of the League of Islamic Universities. The lectures he delivered at Indian, Arab and western Universities have been appreciated as original contribution to the study of Islam and on Islam's relevance to the modern age. As a theorist of a revivalist movement, in particular he believed Islamic civilisation could be revived via a synthesis of western ideas and Islam. In 1980, he received the King Faisal International Prize, followed by the Sultan of Brunei International Prize and the UAE Award in 1999.

== Early life ==
Abul Hasan Ali Nadwi was born in the Takiya Kalaan, Rae-Bareilly in North India on 5 December 1913, he was named Ali and his full name is Ali bin Abdul Hay bin Fahruddeen Al-Hasani. His lineage joins to Hasan Al Musanna bin Imam Hasan bin Ali bin Abi Talib. Coming from a highly educated family, he was an eminent scholar, writer, an Alim, and a personality of the world of Islam in the last half century. His father was Abdul Hayy Hasani, author of famous books like Nuzhatul Khawatir (a biographical dictionary of Indian Ulama) and Al-Thaqafah al-Islamiyah fil-Hind (Islamic Culture in India). He was a descendant of Syed Ahmad Barelvi who had led a Jihad movement against the British occupation, established an Islamic state in the North Western Frontier (now in Pakistan) and fell martyr on the battlefield of Balakot in 1831. Moreover, he was one of the few non-Arabs today who had fully mastered spoken and written Arabic. Although he is an Arab by lineage, yet his family had lost its roots with the Arabic world and he grew up as an Indian Muslim. He was popularly known in India as Ali Miyan. He was popularly known world-wide by the name of Nadwi, which was not his family name; it was synonymous to higher rank of Islamic intellectuals belonged to a particular institution: the scholars educated at the Nadwat-ul-Ulama in (Lucknow), India, took the name `Nadwi' and the name `Nadwi' in this research refers to Abul Hasan Ali Nadwi.

Nadwi grew up and was guided in a God fearing environment in the guardianship of his family. His father Hakim Syed Abdul Hayy Nadwi al-Hasani served as Rector of Nadwat-ul-ulama until he died on Friday 1923 when Abul Hasan Ali Nadwi was nine years of age. Having lost his father, young Ali grew up under the shadow of his mother and the guardianship of his brother, Hakim Abdul Ali Nadwi (who qualified from both Dar al-Ulum Deoband and Nadwat-ul-Ulama). He lived in his early childhood in Takiyya Kalan; Rae-Bareilly. He later migrated to Lucknow with his father because of his father's profession as a doctor. His mother had memorised the Qur’ān and acquired higher education, a rare distinction for a woman of her times. She was a poet as well as a writer. She wrote the book for the guidance of women and young girls with the name of Husnul Maashirah (Social Manners) and the book of poems by the name of Bahrurrahmah. When Ali was young he spent most of his time in his elder brother's house, under his supervision and tender care. A particularly important influence on him at this stage was his elder brother, Sayyid Abd al-Ali al Hasani who later went on to be trained as a medical doctor at King George's Medical College, Lucknow, and then assumed the post of Rector of the Nadwat-ul-Ulama. His elder brother was able, through his deep knowledge both in western education and Islam, to ensure his upbringing in the Islamic way of life. By this time he had developed a deep commitment to the cause of Islam.

== Intellectual Milieu ==
He received a B.A in Arabic literature from the University of Lucknow in 1927. In order to be trained as an Alim (religious scholar), he was sent to Nadwatul Ulama for higher studies. Nadwat al-ulama also known as Nadwa, the choice of the name got inspiration from a hall in Makkah, where nobles used to assemble to debate and discuss. It was one of the renowned Islamic universities in the world, which has produced several famous scholars. It was founded in 1894 at Kanpur and eventually shifted to Lucknow (India) in 1898. It was established with the objective of countering the challenges of western education; striking out equilibrium between classical Islam and modernity and producing a new breed of Islamic scholars of higher level, molded in classical Islamic disciplines and new ideas to regain the intellectual initiative lost in the wake of colonial occupation. At Nadwa, young Nadwi was exposed to new trends prevalent in Islamic thoughts in other Muslim countries. He was also benefitted from the two leading Arab teachers at Dar al ulum. One of those teachers is Khalil Muhammad of Yemen and Muhammad Taqi-ud-Din al-Hilali of Morocco who taught him modern verbal and written Arabic. He studied Hadith under Hussain Ahmad Madani at Darul Uloom Deoband and Tafsir under Ahmed Ali Lahori where he came in touch with Iqbal whose poetry left an abiding impression on him.

The major turning point in Nadwi's life came in 1934, when he was appointed to teach Arabic and Qur’anic commentary at Nadwat al-Ulama, after the completion of his studies. The Nadwa committed itself to spread the teachings of Nadwi since he played a pivotal role in turning the institution into well acknowledged research center world widely, just as he was to remain central to the life of the institution, turning it into a widely recognised centre for Islamic research. As Hasan writes, one of his principal concerns as head of the institution was to promote suitable changes in the educational system in accordance with the demand of the modern age.

== Intellectual Discourse ==
=== Reconstruction of Western Civilisation ===
The West with its technology has been able to master the civilisation of the world today because it is considered able to answer the challenges and demands of the modern world. Nadwi provides insightful views and ideas about the concept of Islam in life. In some of his ideas, he does not give misconceptions of the goodness of life with the advancement of technology and identity, but the value of the glorified modernity of the West has the building of cultural values which is 'misconception' with Islamic terminology. Nadwi in this case also reveals that tribal wars and identity with the West can be seen from two perspectives; First, the defense of identity as a positive color, this view is expressed as an appreciation of the consistency of geographical dichotomy and western culture in maintaining the identity and even affect the surrounding civilisation, as previously revealed that the West despite having areas that tend to have the same land but can still survive as an identity the substantial where the one with the other cannot be equated. According to Nadwi such a concept contains an Islamic value. A Muslim must be able to show his identity as a Muslim, preserving this identity is certainly not merely an identity in a literal sense, more than that, the identity that is meant is a terminological meaning that embodies the various values that emulate it. A Muslim should have an existence based on Islam (Al-Quran and Ḥadis). Islam as a value (identity) must be maintained in accordance with the indicators (arguments) in it. For example, in terms of association, in terms of neighborhood, in terms of dress, including in terms of economic. Because in the true Islam through the value contained in it has contained a variety of teachings that are quite universal, including in the things mentioned above. Maintaining Identity as a Muslim the law must be done because that is part of the meaning of Islam itself as a theology (belief). Nadwi reveals that maintaining identity is the first step to strengthening faith in Muslims.

Secondly, Western identity is a negative meaning. The West does maintain its identity so that with that identity they proudly and stigmatised 'tilted' towards another identity. Al-Nadwi reveals that Islam does not teach so, Western modernism according to him should be responded proportionately because the teaching of identity contained in it is contains the value of Jahiliyyah where the people who no longer respect other people who are different. Islam teaches li ta'arafu between humans amid the difference. Al-Nadwî reveals the West despite appearing with its stunning medal face, but it holds an undeniable dilemma, that in fact the West is not united in a strong (identity) relationship. They are in a separate conscience between one and the other with the boundaries of tribal egoism and material interests. This is according to al-Nadwî that in fact the West has been transformed into Jahiliyyah modern. Al-Nadwî further explained that the recognition of identity should be in Islam with the proper terminology. Al-Nadwi reveals one offer is back to Islam. Islam is meant universally, including the reflection of its civilisation. Long before the West which has been widely claimed to have modernised modernisation, Islam actually has done that long before the 7th century. Al-Nadwî in this discussion exemplifies the history of the glory of Islam in the days of Umar bin Abd al-Aziz (717-720). Abul Hasan Ali al-Hasani al-Nadwî explains that humans can be united with the glue of religion that haq is the religion of Islam, not only for the Muslims itself, more than it covers the welfare of mankind, because Islam is revealed to all nature. One reflection which was then put forward by al-Nadwî is that along with the glory of Islam is also dragged the glory of his people universally which in turn is not only merely touch the Muslims themselves, but also by other people who are socially not to be distinguished. According to al-Nadwi, this kind of context is not visible from the civilisation (modernisation) of the West today, the modernisation of the West according to him is colonised where progress adversely affects other identities. In examining identity and modernisation, al-Nadwî offers several opinions, first formal approaches, two historical approaches, three social approaches, four economical approaches. In the formal order of Religion Islam has a source of teaching that becomes the frame of every movement, namely the Qur'an and Hadith. In the context of modernisation and identity the Qur'an seems to have a not-so-small concept, in which the Qur'an for example contains fraternal values, trade terminology, association, marriage, dress, education, and the Qur'an also contain scientific values, health, and so forth. According to al-Nadwi, the Qur'an with its perfect content should be part of the foundation of living for a Muslim. The textuality of the verses on some sides may be clarified sociologically based on the practices shown by Muḥammad. In the context of modernity, there seems to be no doubt that the Prophet Muhammad with his teachings of Islam has managed to modernise Arabia. Practical life shown by the Prophet also becomes hand in hand that accompanies the content of the Qur'an.

Islam once 'lead the world'. This historical approach can be traced in his book Saviours of Islamic Spirit; in this book he introduces various figures who can be role models of a Muslim, such as Umar II, Hasan al-Basri, Ahmad ibn Hanbal, Al-Ghazali, Abdul Qadir Gilani, Rumi, Ibn Taymiyyah, Shah Waliullah Dehlawi, Ahmad Sirhindi. In the muqaddimah part of this book he reveals a small conclusion that "Islam never thirsts mujaddid". According to al-Nadwî, the error is much seen from the Muslims themselves in choosing the wrong path. If the early Muslims dealt with the heresy and the conflict of understanding, then in modern times and millennia Islam confronted the more complex term of 'Jahiliyyah' culture Al-Nadwî advocated, in minimising the impact of modernisation of Western Jahiliyyah today, the regeneration of Muslims should be introduced to a clear historiography of Islam as a movement of civilisation progress and assert that Western modernisation contains primitive Jahiliyah values. This historical study according to al-Nadwî needs to be done in conveying the Islamic treasures of its existence. Al-Nadwi said in a social approach how much criticism is expressed against the West actually refers more to the social elements that are in it. Western culture according to al-Nadwî does not at all reflect Islamic fundamental values in any way. The historical fact mentioned by al-Nadwî in his book, that more than 32,000 death penalties in Europe are burned alive. According to al-Nadwî, the unfair Law that Europeans applied to other nations seemed to portray enmity and eliminate the principle of justice which is the principle of a law, not just the classical era, this unfair legal fanaticism continues to be applied by the West in strengthening its power as a superpower medieval age. Al-Nadwî also provided a constructive critique of Western education. According to al-Nadwî, Western education led to the frost and decline of morality due to the loneliness of spiritual decline. Al-Nadwî also gave various analyses that Western Education orientation is a lot of material, wants a high position and earn a large salary without implanting spiritual value. According to al-Nadwi, Western education is racing to become stronger and then with that power they make other nation tips slumped. Al-Nadwî in his book Imam Abd al-Qadir al-Jailânî reveals this condition by relating it to civilisation in the time of al-Jailānî, he writes: "...'Abd al-Qadir al-Jailānî has witnessed what has been fall the lives of Muslims of his day. They live fragmented and hostile. Love of the world has dominated in addition to fighting for honor on the side of King and Sultan, man has turned to matter, position and power...". In addition to his social criticisms of the West, al-Nadwî gave a fairly intense notion of social life. This is evident from the practices of daily life. Al-Nadwî in some facts, famous as people who closely associate with the community, as much expressed by the surrounding community as well as observations that once the author witnessed one example that al-Nadwî spelled out routinely provide material assistance to Muslims and non-Muslims after each prayer Asr at home, this assistance is expected to be given to 40 people. This phenomenon as a form of bi al-hâl's preaching to non-Muslims to in turn see Islam as a potentially positive enough to follow.

This attitude as an orientation of the word of Allâh in Al-Baqara: "There is no compulsion to (enter) religion (Islam); in fact it is clearly the right path rather than a misguided path. Therefore, whoever denies Thaghut and believes in Allâh, then he has indeed held on to a very strong rope that will never break. And Allâh is Hearing, Knower, Knowing"^{[Quran 2:256]}. Al-Nadwi in his ideas in his daily life towards non-Muslims is quite diplomatic in his book, Islam and the World al-Nadwî quotes the Qur'anic verse: It means: "Those who believe fight in the cause of Allah, and those who reject Faith in the way of Thaghut, therefore fight the friends of Shaytaan, because in fact the deception of Satan is weak"^{[Quran 4:76]}. Al-Nadwî reveals that wars are very close to the devil's demands. With him, the most appropriate da'wah for the present condition is by deeds (bi al-hâl), with which the best Islamic da'wah is to show a self-identity as a Muslim based on his teachings. Al-Nadwî criticised the social life that denied the concept of Hospitality, amid Western material progress, he saw no strong interpersonal unity among they so not infrequently neighbors do not know each other, do not help each other let alone visit each other. The concept that is in the Western stretcher is anti-social. One thing must also be known by the Muslims against the existence of the West, that they tend to ignore Religion, they do not know God, even Atheists. So social is often seen is social freedom, social relationships are free sex, pornography and so forth. According to al-Nadwî, Western westernisation is very necessary to watch out for, the colonisation of Western culture not only erode the culture of a nation but also even erode its Religion.

=== Judaism, Zionism and Antisemitism ===
According to him, exposure to "injustice, oppression, chastisement, extradition, troubles, hardships" and domination by other nations is the destiny of Jews because of their evils, such as arrogance, racial supremism, altering relegious laws for material benefits and so on. They were globally infamous for being excessively proud of their genealogy. While they were "meek and submissive in distress, they were tyrannical and mean when they had the upper hand". "Hypocrisy, deceit, treachery, selfishness, cruelty and usuriousness" had become integral to their nature. Nadwi points out how the Qur’an repeatedly refers to "the extent to which they had sunk into degradation in the sixth and the seventh centuries". The Jewish heritage, according to Nadwi, was primarily composed of "intrigue and crime, violence and high-handed tactics", "their inborn tendencies which could clearly be discerned at any time or place where they have happened to reside, like a pivot on which their entire intelligence and endeavours have always revolved for the satisfaction of their ulterior motives". "Every insurrection and revolution, conspiracy and intrigue,lawlessness and anarchy" had been the brainchild of the Jews. They had triggered "every movement designed to foment social, political, economic and moral disintegration of the non-Jewish people".

The characteristics of Jews, according to Nadwi, were exultingly summed up by an eminent Jew, Dr. Oscar Levy, who described them as "the rulers of the world; mischief mongers who foment every trouble and turmoil, wherever it might be". He believed that the Jews have failed to give any message of salvation for humanity. The reason for this, Nadwi explains, is that, according to the Jews, salvation is determined by birth, irrespective of one’s belief or action. This notion of the superiority of the Jewish race "signally incompatible with the spirit of any universal message of brotherhood and equality of mankind....Such an idea, naturally, delimits even the scope of divine guidance and salvation and places restriction on its dissemination beyond the closed circle of one’s blood kin".

This, according to Nadwi also explains why Judaism can never become a universal religion and why it remains a non-proselytising faith. He adds: The logical result of such an attitude was that the Jews should discriminate against other nations and evolve such norms of virtue and vice, right and wrong, which should make allowance for the superiority of one race over the other. And, then, nothing more is required to justify and persist in the cruelest (sic) injustice against the non-Jewish people. The Qur’an alludes to this very attitude of the Jews when it says: That is because they say: We have no duty to the Gentiles.

=== Partition of India ===
He opposed the partition of India, agreeing with his teacher Hussain Ahmad Madani.

== Writings ==
Abul Hassan Ali Nadwi primarily wrote in Arabic, although also in Urdu, and wrote more than fifty books on history, theology, and biography, and thousands of seminar papers, articles, and recorded speeches.

His 1950 book Maza Khasiral Alam be Inhitat al-Muslimeen (lit. What did the world lose with the decline of Muslims?), translated into English as Islam and the World, was largely responsible for popularising the concept of "modern Jahiliyya" The Islamist author Syed Qutb commended Nadwi's writings for his use of the word jahiliyya to describe not a particular age in history (as earlier Muslim scholars did) but a state of moral corruption and materialism.

He wrote 'Qasas al-Nabiyyeen' (translated as 'Stories of the Prophets') for his nephew that became famous among the Arabic learners and the book was soon included in the syllabi for teaching Arabic at various institutions around the globe. Being a fan of Dr. Muhammad Iqbal, Ali Nadwi also undertook the task of introducing Iqbal and his Islamic thoughts to the Arab world. Thus, he wrote 'Rawa'i' Iqbal' which was subsequently rendered in to Urdu as 'Nuqoosh-i-Iqbal'.

He wrote a detailed biography of his father in Urdu entitled 'Hayat-e-Abdul Haiy'. He also wrote a biographical account of his mother in 'Zikr-e-Khayr'. While he also penned his autobiography, 'Karawan-e-Zindagi', in 7 volumes.

An adherent of pan-Islamism, he opposed secular Arab nationalism and pan-Arabism. He also had a lifelong association with the Tablighi Jamaat.

Dr. Shah has summarised some of his salient thoughts in the following words:

'Maulana Ali Nadwi sincerely and staunchly believed that the real threat to the modern world, especially the Muslim world, is neither the lack of material development nor the political disturbances, rather it's the moral and spiritual decline. He firmly believed that Islam alone has the ability to overturn this and thus Muslims must wake up to make an effort in this regard. By staying back, he argued, the Muslims were not only failing themselves rather the entire humanity! He stressed on Muslims, especially those living in a Muslim majority countries (like Pakistan), to develop a society based on Islamic principles that could become a model (for its moral and spiritual values) for the rest of the world. He was a strong critic of nationalism and stressed upon working for the humanity, collectively. He also laid much emphasis on the crucial role women for upholding the teachings of Islam in a society. Instead of trying to shut their doors for the incoming western influence, he believed that the intellectual Muslims should study the contemporary Western ideologies and form their own ideology in its response, withholding the 'superior moral values of Islam'. He opposed 'Islamic groups' from clashing with the 'secular elite' in Muslim majority countries and instead encouraged for an 'inclusive approach' wherein the 'secular elite' could be gradually and positively called towards Islam, without causing any chaos in the society. Similarly, he also urged Muslims living as a minority to maintain peace and create a valuable position for themselves through hard work and exemplary morals.'

== Positions, honours and awards ==
- 1962 Founding member/Secretary of the first inaugural session and foundation of Muslim World League in Mecca.
- 1980 King Faisal Award
- Founding Chairman of Oxford Centre for Islamic Studies.
- 1984 President of 'League of Islamic Literature'.
- 1999 'Islamic Personality of Year' award established by Sheikh Mohammed of United Arab Emirates.
- 1999 Sultan of Brunei Award

After his death, the International Islamic University, Islamabad (IIUI), Pakistan, arranged a seminar in his honor and published the speeches and articles presented therein as ‘Maulana Sayyid Abul Hasan Ali Nadwi – Hayat-o-Afkar Kay Chand Pehlu’

== Access to the Kaaba ==
In 1951, during his second pilgrimage (Hajj) to Makkah the key-bearer of the Kaaba (Islam's holiest building), opened its door for two days and allowed Abul Hassan Ali Nadwi to take anyone he chose inside.

He was given the key to the Kaaba to allow him to enter whenever he chose during his pilgrimage.

== Death ==
Abul Hasan Ali Hasani Nadwi died on 23 Ramadan, 1420 AH (31 December 1999) in Raebareli, India at the age of 85.

== Legacy ==
=== PhD Thesis ===
PhD and MA thesis written on Abul Hasan Ali Hasani Nadwi:

- Zawahir, M. Nafeel M. (2008). Comparative study on Abul Hasan Ali Nadwi's political thought, with particular reference to his contempararies, Abul A'la Mawdudi and Sayyid Qutb (PhD). Lampeter: University of Wales. Archived from the original on 19 April 2022.
- Choughuley, Abdul Kader (2008). Da'wah, peace and dialogue in the writings of Sayyid Abul Hasan 'Ali Nadwi, 1913-1999 (MA). South Africa: University of Johannesburg. hdl:10210/1247.
- Zubair Zafar, Khan (2010). A critical study of Moulana Abul Hasan Ali nadwis Islamic thought (PhD). India: Department of Islamic Studies, Aligarh Muslim University. hdl:10603/60854.
- Sari, Ika Mustika (2012). Islamic educational thought of Abul Hasan Ali Hasani Nadwi (PhD) (in Indonesian). Indonesia: Maulana Malik Ibrahim State Islamic University Malang.
- Musleh Uddin, Muhammad (2009). Syed Abul Hasan Ali Nadvi: Religion and Social Thought (PhD) (in Bengali). Bangladesh: University of Dhaka.
- Sulthoni, Akhmad; Muindinillah, Basri; Syamsul, Hidayat (2013). Abul Hasan Ali An-Nadwi's View of Western Civilization (PhD) (in Indonesian). Indonesia: Muhammadiyah University of Surakarta.
- Noorul Ameen, Mohamood (2013). Philosophical and educational thoughts in the works of Abul Hassan Ali Nadvi (PhD). India: Kannur University. hdl:10603/85300.
- Gaffar, Abdul (2004). The contributions of Moulana Abul Hasan Ali Nadvi to Urdu language and literature (PhD) (in Urdu). India: Sree Sankaracharya University of Sanskrit. hdl:10603/137480.
- Abdul Sahib Khdoom, El Maliki Haidar (2016). Abul hasan al nadawi manhajuhu wakutubuhu aladabiyyah (PhD) (in Arabic). India: Dr. Babasaheb Ambedkar Marathwada University. hdl:10603/147893.
- Yahiya, Mohmmad (2017). MAULANA ALI MIYAN NADVI KI KHAKA NIGARI KA TANQIDEE MUTALAA (PhD) (in Urdu). India: Panjab University. hdl:10603/103792.
- Bhat, Samee-Ullah (2017). Syed Abul Hasan Ali Nadwis Contribution to Islamic History A Study with Special Reference to his Tarikh i Dawat o Azimat (PhD). India: Shah-i-Hamdan Institute of Islamic Studies, University of Kashmir. hdl:10603/207015.
- Ahmad, Peer Maqsood (1992). Contribution of Maulana Syed Abul Hassan Ali Nadwi to Arabic Language and Literature (PhD) (in Arabic). India: Department of Arabic, University of Kashmir. hdl:10603/140862.
- Laique, Asif (2019). Role of Abul Hasan Ali Nadwi in Developing Islamic Literature in The Arabic Language: An Analytical Study (PhD). India: Department of Arabic, Maulana Azad National Urdu University. hdl:10603/337819.
- Hasanuzzaman, Hazrat (2011). Socio_historical aspects in the writings of Abul Hasan Ali Nadwi with special reference to Ma_Dha Khasira Al_Aalam Bi_Inhitatil Muslimeen (PhD) (in Arabic). India: Department of Arabic, Assam University. hdl:10603/97104.

=== Biography ===
Biography written on Abul Hasan Ali Hasani Nadwi:

- Chapter 4 Sayyid Abu'l-Hasan 'Ali Nadwi. Princeton University Press. 7 June 2021. pp. 107–128. doi:10.1515/9781400833801-007. ISBN 978-1-4008-3380-1.
- Nadwi, Bilal Abdul Hai Hasani (2013). Sawaneh Mufakkir-e-Islām (in Urdu) (3rd ed.). Raibareli: Sayyid Ahmad Shaheed Academy.

=== Journal article ===
Journal article on Abul Hasan Ali Hasani Nadwi:

- Bhaat, Samee-Ullah (2016). "Life and Works of Abul Hasan 'Ali Nadwi (RA): An Analytical Study". Journal of Islamic Thought and Civilization. 06 (1): 47–60. doi:10.32350/jitc.61.04. ISSN 2075-0943. S2CID 187423359.
- Islam, Dr Rafiqul (30 April 2020). "Sayed Abul Hasan Ali Hassani Nadwi: As a Socio-Religious reformer of the World". International Journal of Advanced Science and Technology. 29 (5): 13690–13692. ISSN 2005-4238.
- Ahmad, Khalil; Ali, Muhammad Mumtaz; Siddiqi, Yousuf Azim (14 September 2020). "Religious Harmony in India's Post-Independence Phase: A Comparative Study of the Approach of Abul Hasan Ali Nadawi and Wahiduddin Khan". Al-Itqan: Journal of Islamic Sciences and Comparative Studies. 4 (2): 33–49. ISSN 2600-8432.
- Ibrahim, Mulyadi (7 June 2020). "Rekontruksi Tazkiyah al-Nafs Menurut Abu Hasan al-Nadwi". At-Tafkir. 13 (1). doi:10.32505/at.v13i1.1570. ISSN 2620-5858. S2CID 219921727. Archived from the original on 22 July 2021.
- Gada, Muhammad Yaseen (17 December 2019). "How to Study the Qur'an: Sayyid Abul Hasan Ali Nadwi's Approach, written by Choughley, Abdul Kader". Al-Bayan: Journal of Qur'an and Hadith Studies. 17 (2): 247–250. doi:10.1163/22321969-12340076. ISSN 2232-1969. S2CID 213684686.
- Ghouri, Syed Abdul Majid (15 June 2019). "Sheikh Abul Hassan Ali Hassani Nadwi and His Contributions to The Sciences of Prophetic Hadith: A Concise Expository Study". Al-Irsyad: Journal of Islamic and Contemporary Issues (in Arabic). 4 (1): 57–77. doi:10.53840/alirsyad.v4i1.47 (inactive 11 July 2025). ISSN 2550-1992. S2CID 245722820.
- Zamzam, Ahmad Fahmi (30 June 2000). "Abu Al-Hasan 'Ali Al-Hasani An-Nadwi: Keperibadian, Sejarah Hidup dan Perjuangan". Jurnal Usuluddin. 11: 79–92. ISSN 0128-0708.
- Timol, Riyaz (2 October 2014). "Shaykh Abu al-Hasan Ali Nadwi: His Life & Works". Islam and Christian–Muslim Relations. 25 (4): 538–540. doi:10.1080/09596410.2014.926600. ISSN 0959-6410. S2CID 145231248.
- Nasir, Mohd Shahrizal; Mat Teh, Kamarul Shukri (1 June 2021). "Pandangan al-Nadwi Tentang Kepentingan al-Sirah al-Nabawiyyah dalam Pendidikan Kanak-Kanak: Al-Nadwi's View on the Importance of al-Sirah al-Nabawiyyah in Children's Education". Journal of Quran Sunnah Education & Special Needs. 5 (1): 227–242. doi:10.33102/jqss.vol5no1.97. ISSN 2590-3799. S2CID 236362753.
- Bredi, Daniela (12 August 1999). "Sādāt in South Asia: the Case of Sayyid abū 'L-ḥasan 'Alī Nadwī". Oriente Moderno. 79 (2): 375–392. doi:10.1163/22138617-07902007. ISSN 2213-8617.
- Mannar, M. Abduh Al; Tamam, Abas Mansur; Syafri, Ulil Amri (6 March 2018). "20 KONSEP PENDIDIKAN ISLAM AN NADWI DALAM MENANGKAL LIBERALISASI". Prosiding Bimbingan Konseling: 177–185. Archived from the original on 14 October 2022.
- Monang, Sori (29 June 2020). "Theological Thinking Abû al-Ḥasan 'Alî al-Hasani al-Nadwî". Britain International of Humanities and Social Sciences Journal. 2 (2): 586–593. doi:10.33258/biohs.v2i2.261. ISSN 2685-3868. S2CID 225792661.
- Setiawan, Azhari (1 August 2017). "Syed Abul Hasan Ali Hasani an-Nadwi Tentang Keruntuhan Peradaban, Pandangan Hidup, dan Pendidikan Islam". Tasfiyah: Jurnal Pemikiran Islam. 1 (2): 277–304. doi:10.21111/tasfiyah.v1i2.1854. ISSN 2613-9863. Archived from the original on 15 November 2024.
- Hartung, Jan-Peter (2009). Christmann, Andreas; Hartung, Jan-Peter (eds.). "Religious Education in Transition: The Moral and Academic Training of Sayyid Abû 'l-Hasan ´Alî Nadwî". Journal of Semitic Studies: Supplt: Islamica Studies in Memory of Holger Preissler (1943-2006). 26: 231–255. Archived from the original on 26 April 2025.
- Rahim, Adibah Abdul; Muhammad, Saud (31 December 2021). "Revival of Islamic Civilization: Strategies for the Development of Muslim Society in the Thought of Abul Hasan Ali Nadwi (Kebangkitan Tamadun Islam: Strategi Pembangunan Masyarakat Islam dalam Pemikiran Abul Hasan Ali Nadwi)". Journal of Islam in Asia. 18 (3): 188–204. doi:10.31436/jia.v18i3.1056. ISSN 2289-8077. S2CID 245664809.
- Mulyadi, Mulyadi (1 December 2021). "Integration of Character Education and Tazkiyah al-Nafs: Perspective of Abū Hasan al-Nadwī". ADDIN. 15 (2): 303–330. doi:10.21043/addin.v15i2.14509. ISSN 2476-9479. S2CID 252725283.

=== Center for Research, Dawah and Islamic Thoughts ===
Dar-e-Arafat is the representative institution of Nadwi's ideology and dawah. This department has been established by the name of "Abul Hasan Ali Nadwi center for Research, Dawah and Islamic thoughts" It provides free Islamic books, print Islamic books, online free Islamic books, and PDFS, among other medias.

=== Educational and Welfare Foundation, Aligarh ===
Established in 2003, the goal of the center is to uplift the standard of Muslim minorities in economic, religious, social, cultural, and educational fields. It is located in Hamdard Nagar "D" Dhorra Byepass Road Aligarh, Uttar Pradesh.

=== Shaykh Abul Hasan Ali Nadwi Islamic Research Center, Dhaka, Bangladesh ===
Shaykh Abul Hasan Ali Nadwi Islamic Research Center, Dhaka is a unique Institution for Higher Islamic Education & Research in Bangladesh.

== See also ==
- Bibliography of Abul Hasan Ali Hasani Nadwi
- List of Deobandis
