= Glory of Iqbal =

Book by Abul Hasan Ali Hasani Nadwi

- Cover of English Version
- Author: Abul Hasan Ali Hasani Nadwi
- Language: Arabic
- Subject: Muhammad Iqbal
- Publication place: India
- English publication date: 1973
- Media type: Hardcover
- ISBN: 978-0953758296 English Version
- OCLC: 1254854
- Dewey Decimal: 297.09
- LC Class: PK2199.I65 Z794519
- Website: abulhasanalinadwi.org

Glory of Iqbal (Urdu: نقوش اقبال, romanized: Nuqoosh-e-Iqbal) is a book written by Abul Hasan Ali Hasani Nadwi that seeks to present the poet Muhammad Iqbal to the Arab world. It was first published in Arabic language as Rawa-e Iqbal and it was later translated into Urdu by Shams Tabriz Khan as Nuqoosh-e-Iqbal. It is Nadwi’s most popular work, and it is sold across the Muslim world, particularly in India and the Arab States.
