= Muslims in India (book) =

1953 book by Abul Hasan Ali Hasani Nadwi

- Cover of English Version
- Author: Abul Hasan Ali Hasani Nadwi
- Original title: المسلمون في الهند
- Translator: Mohammad Asif Kidwai
- Language: Arabic
- Subject: History of Indian Muslims
- Publisher: Dar Ibn Kathir
- Publication date: 1953
- Publication place: India
- Media type: Hardcover
- Pages: 262
- ISBN: 978-9388850919 English Version
- OCLC: 2490799
- Dewey Decimal: 954
- LC Class: BP63 .I4 N28
- Website: abulhasanalinadwi.org

Muslims in India (Arabic: المسلمون في الهند, romanized: almuslimun fil hind) is a book by Abul Hasan Ali Hasani Nadwi, originally written in Arabic as Al Muslimun fil Hind. It is a historical illustration of Indian Muslims and their religious, educational, and cultural struggle. It was published from Dar Ibn Kathir in 1953. Its English translation was rendered by Mohammad Asif Kidwai.

== Description ==
It was originally delivered in Arabic and afterwards translated into Urdu and later into English as Muslims in India. The role of Islam and Muslims in the history of India has been deliberately distorted, first by western writers, to serve their vested interests in India; by the socialist and secular historian blinded by ideological baggage, Hindu extremist writers because of their jaundiced views about it and as well by the Muslims apologetic writers. As, Maulana Nadwi himself writes:

The tragedy, however, is not confined only to ignorance what is worse and more disconcerting is that there has got created in our country a powerful tendency to blackout and reject the history and the cultural stock of a whole community, its past achievements and the glorious contribution it has made to the national fight for independence. There is a foot campaign to present the history of our land in a manner as if the Muslim era in India was an era of foreign, imperialistic domination; it was devoid of all virtue and greatness and failed miserably to produce a single noteworthy personality, a single remarkable achievement in the domains of thought and culture, a single act of unpolluted, selfless service to the country’s welfare and development of which the nation could be proud, and that in the long-drawn battle for freedom against the British, the Muslims were nothing more than disinterested spectators, and if they did, accidentally, take part, it was not worthy of attention…Though it is entirely in opposition to what history tells.

—

To dispel misconception created by some misinformation about the role of Muslims in India, Nadwi's book considered as the most useful publication on the subject, which has given an apt respond to those historians, who consider the period of Islamic dominations as a Dark Age in the history of this subcontinent. Published in 1953 C.E. when Muslims in India were in desperate search for such objective writing, projected the real image with accuracy to ward off senseless onslaughts on their identity and existence in their very homeland. This comprehensive but a brief book is highly useful because it is not possible for all to read other voluminous work in Persian and even in Urdu of the old style to enquire into the manifold cultural, literacy, material, and political achievements of Muslim period in Indian history. Therefore, this book of Nadwi gives detailed exposition of Muslim genuineness that has gone into the making of Indian history and culture. Their presence at every form of life throughout the most important period of Indian history drew out the best in them, laying the foundation of a broad-based and composite culture. The contribution of Muslims at all levels of life and society left its multi-dimensional impression on almost all human activity, including statecraft and land management. He demonstrated the role played by the Muslims in the progress and development of the motherland, the achievements of Muslim scholars and their contribution and role of Muslims in the freedom struggle of India. In the words of Nadwi,

They gave India and Indian civilization a new lease of life and a new dimension and awakened its people to a new set of moral and spiritual values. Every path of its land and every particle of its soil bear the imprint of their greatness and is a monument of its industry, earnestness and creative genius. In every aspect of Indian life and civilization can be seen evidences of their noble aestheticism and cultural richness.

—
