= Saviours of Islamic Spirit =

1955 book by Abul Hasan Ali Hasani Nadwi

- Cover of English Version
- Author: Abul Hasan Ali Hasani Nadwi
- Original title: تاریخ دعوت و عزیمت
- Translator: Abu Saeed Muhammad Omar Ali (Bengali)
- Language: Urdu
- Subject: History of Islam
- Publisher: Darul Musannefin Shibli Academy
- Publication date: 1955–1984
- Publication place: India
- Media type: Hardcover
- Award: Sultan Brunei International Award (1999)
- ISBN: 978-1933764139 English Version
- OCLC: 572590
- Dewey Decimal: 297.09
- LC Class: BP70 .N31713
- Website: abulhasanalinadwi.org

Saviours of Islamic Spirit (Urdu: تاریخ دعوت و عزیمت, romanized: Tarikh-i Dawat Wa Azimat) is a series book on History of Islam originally written in Urdu by Abul Hasan Ali Hasani Nadwi. The first volume was published in 1955 and the last volume (fifth) was published in 1984. The book contains a series of biographies and histories of a number of reformers from Umar Ibn Abdul Aziz in the 1st century AH to Shah Waliullah Dehlawi in the 12th century AH. It received the Sultan Brunei International Award in 1999 from University of Oxford.

== Description ==
Nadwi's personality and vision seemed largely defined by his five volume magnum opus, Tarikh-i Dawat Wa Azimat, translated into English as Saviours of Islamic Spirit (4 vols.). In these volumes, he has extensively portrayed the intellectual and religious efforts of Islam, its social history and revivalist and reformative endeavors and has introduced in a copious way the leaders of such movements. He had categorically stated in the introduction of the book that in Islam there has been a continuity of reformative movements and there were no long interregnums of suspense or in action. Tarikh-i Dawat wa Azimat answers the key questions in Islamic history. Viz, what’s there in Islamic society which, despite all the vicissitudes and debacles, explains its undiminished resilience? The Islamic history is a history of dawah and fortitude and which keeps on refusing and reviving itself through Tajdid, Islah and Jihad. Tarikh-i Dawat Wa Azimat provides an alternative view of looking at Islamic history as a history of Ulama and intellectuals instead of a chronicle of Sultans and regimes some noble and horrible. Depending upon their respective circumstances some of the Ulama took part in or even led Jihad, others concentrating on winning the hearts and soul of the people. Not surprisingly Islamic society has suffered more by the decline of the Ulama than the disloyalty of its Umara (rich and power people).
