= Viveka Nand Sharan Tripathi =

Indian judge

Hon'ble Justice Viveka Nand Sharan Tripathi

Judge of the Allahabad High Court

Personal details
- Occupation: Judge
- Known for: Judicial Service

Justice Viveka Nand Sharan Tripathi is a judge serving in the Allahabad High Court, one of the oldest and most prominent high courts in India.
