= Karwan-e-Zindagi =

Autobiography of Abul Hasan Ali Hasani Nadwi

- Cover of Urdu Version
- Author: Abul Hasan Ali Hasani Nadwi
- Original title: کاروان زندگی
- Translator: A F M Khalid Hossain (Bengali)
- Language: Urdu
- Subject: Autobiography
- Publication date: 1983–1999
- Publication place: India
- Media type: Hardcover
- Pages: 2518
- ISBN: 9789849184003 Bengali Version
- OCLC: 11755298
- Dewey Decimal: 920.71
- LC Class: BP80.N25 A35 1983
- Website: abulhasanalinadwi.org

Karwan-e-Zindagi (Urdu: کاروان زندگی, lit. 'Caravan of Life') is a voluminous autobiography of Abul Hasan Ali Hasani Nadwi in Seven volumes which is a contribution to the history as well as to Urdu literature. Originally, the book was written in Urdu.

== Contents ==
In this work, Nadwi tried to cover all the information related to himself as well as the remarkable events of his life. His motivation for writing his autobiography is not merely to recount memorable milestones in his life but to provide an all-encompassing spectrum of his activities that delineates his intellectual growth and development. The historical incidents in his life are contextualized to provide the reader an opportunity to examine his role in the said events, in which Nadwi was an active participant. Furthermore, his autobiography makes copious reference to his prolific writings to highlight his contribution to contemporary Islamic thought. The book also attempts to explore Nadwi's vision and thought regarding Islam and humanity as well as what was his attitude for the renaissance of Islam in the modern age. He stated in his autobiography that, he believed in steadfastness, progress, to make use of everything old which is beneficial, welcomed everything new which is sound, adopted from tradition what is sincere and rejected what is dubious. Its represents his synopsis of his other important works, which analyzed for a more complete appreciation of his contribution to contemporary Islamic thought.

== Reception ==
Regarding the book, Muhiuddin Khan said,

The seven-volume book, Karwan-e-Zindagi, is a special mirror of the Muslim Ummah. In writing his autobiography, Hazrat Maulana has not only painted an accurate picture of the contemporary Muslim Ummah, but also an outline of the life to be imitated and followed.

—
