= Glocal University =

University in India

- Motto: Global canvass, local colours Shaping global minds
- Type: Private
- Established: 2012; 14 years ago
- Academic affiliations: UGC, AIU, NCTE
- Chancellor: Md. Iqbal
- Vice-Chancellor: Dr. John Finbe
- Location: Saharanpur, Uttar Pradesh, India; 30.2583°N 77.6224°E
- Website: www.glocaluniversity.edu.in

Glocal University is a private and coeducational institution located in Saharanpur, Uttar Pradesh, India. It is situated in the foothills of Shivalik mountains. The university is a non-profit university established by the Uttar Pradesh Private Universities Act, 2011, (U.P. Act no. 2 of 2012) and is recognised by University Grant Commission. In keeping with its vision of Global canvass, local colours, the school's name is a portmanteau of "global" and "local". The university's 6 major schools offer more than 35 undergraduate, post-graduate, and professional courses. In 2023, Glocal signed an MoU with Noida-based MEKO Health Care Pvt. Ltd. The collaboration aims to enhance the learning support system for healthcare professionals in India and globally by sharing resources for effective upskilling and vocational programs, focusing on digital learning, hands-on training, awarding certifications, degrees, diplomas, and fellowships and sharing infrastructure and technical expertise.

== Facilities ==
=== Campus ===
Glocal's self-contained campus is spread across 350 acres. It is situated close to the urban industrial cities of Saharanpur and Dehradun, on the Dehradun-Saharanpur Road. The university is approximately a two hours by car from Dehradun's Jolly Grant Airport.

Glocal University is a part of the Grand Peak Group.

=== Classrooms and laboratories ===
Glocal's teaching spaces include classrooms, larger lecture halls, and an amphitheatre. They are equipped with multimedia equipment to aid in instruction.

Glocal's engineering laboratories are located in a separate block from the classrooms. They are designed to encourage experimentation, practical application of classroom concepts, and independent work. The lab facilities are used for practical experiments and during academic tests. The laboratories are accessible at all times, although students must sign up for lab time in advance.

=== Library ===
The library is a central support to the university's teaching, learning, and research programmes. Its facilities are available for students, faculty members, and university employees.

Its collection includes CDs and DVDs; books on engineering, science, bioinformatics, humanities, social sciences and mass communication; and copies of research publications. The university is also expanding its holdings through an online portal to major libraries around the world.

=== Hostels ===
Glocal University is a residential campus, with separate in-campus hostels for males and females. The overall capacity for each hostel is 1030 students. Each room is equipped with bed, study table with chair, and almirah. As a whole, the hostels are equipped with air conditioning, RO-filtered drinking water, an uninterrupted power supply, wireless internet, television sets in common rooms, 24-hour security (with special attention to female residents), gymnasium facilities, medical facilities and a bank.

Meals are prepared on-campus under the supervision of a dietician and professional manager. Cuisines include Indian, Chinese, and European.

=== Athletics ===
The institute provides coaches and physical facilities for students to keep them engaged and physically fit. The Glocal campus includes basketball and volleyball courts, cricket and football fields, table tennis equipment, a running track, and a swimming pool. The university's well-maintained landscaping also encourages outdoor activities.

== Administration ==
=== Leadership ===
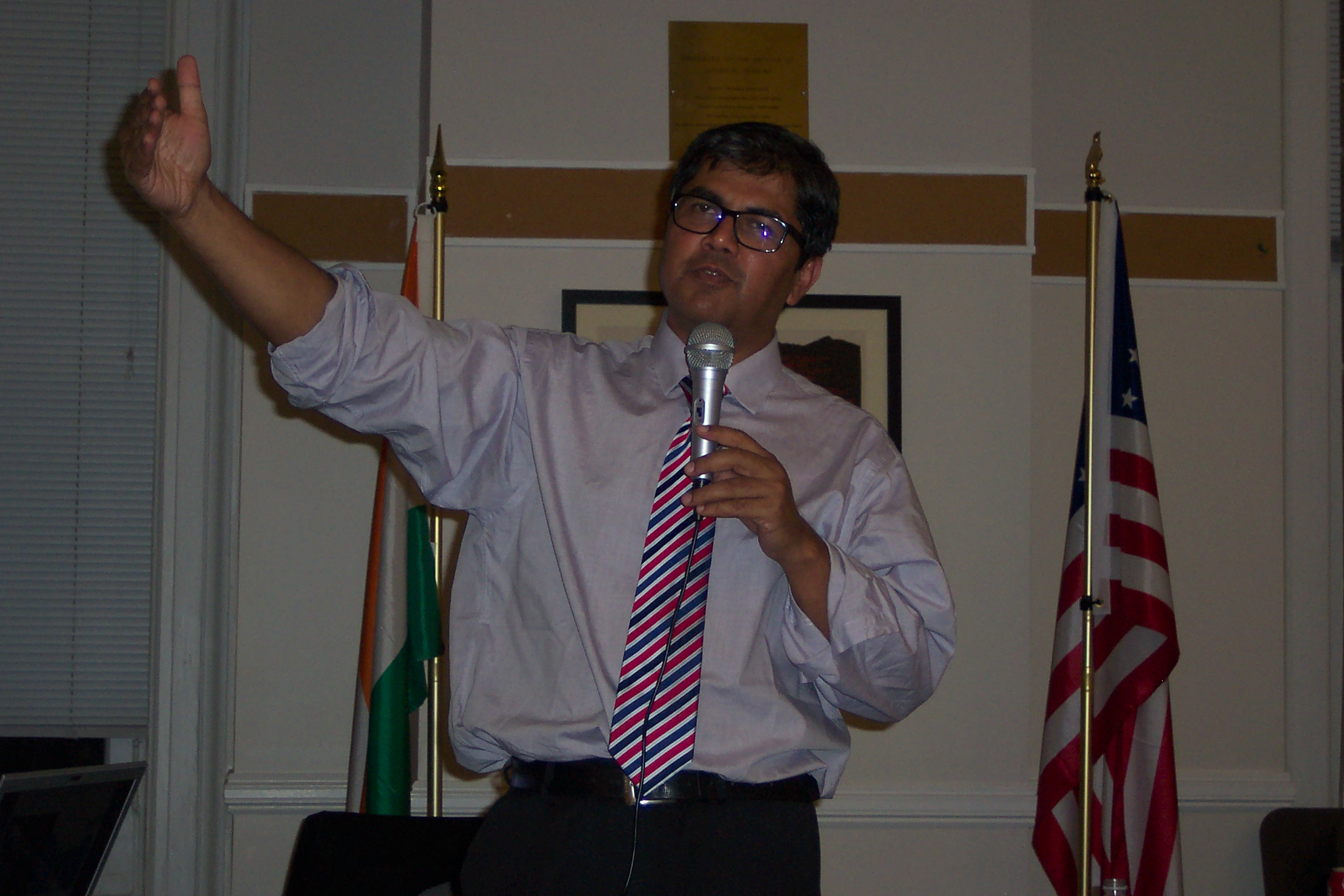
On 27 August 2013, Amir Ullah Khan discussed economics in India as a panellist in Washington, DC.

John Finbe is the vice-chancellor of the Glocal University Saharanpur (Uttar Pradesh).

The academic council consists of Kashi Balachandran, Rajiv Kumar, Syed Safawi, and Rizwan Ahmad. The university's advisory group constitutes a mix of policy makers and experts in their respective disciplines.

=== Campus placements ===
The university has a placement office for students, headed by Indrajit Gupta. Other members of the office consist of alumni from the Indian Institutes of Management and distinguished individuals from industrial, media and legal sectors.

The institute has strong ties with the corporate sector. Internships are available with noted Indian and international companies.

== Academic profile ==
=== Curriculum ===
The curriculum allows students to switch between courses and disciplines. This ensures flexibility and exposure to learning.

Exchange programs with foreign universities also offer Glocal students a first-hand experience of global trends.

=== Accreditation ===
The Glocal University is approved by the University Grants Commission (UGC), and the Bar Council of India (BCI).

== Departments and courses ==
The institute has major schools for instruction in technology, business and commerce, law, and health sciences. Each school has various courses to offer.

Glocal School of Technology

The Glocal School of Technology comprises the B.Tech. program, the Department of Computer Science, and the Department of Natural & Applied Sciences. Together, the School of Technology awards the following degrees:

- Bachelor of Technology (BTech)
  - BTech in Civil Engineering
  - BTech in Electrical Engineering
  - BTech in Electronics & Communication
  - BTech in Mechanical Engineering
  - BTech in Petroleum Engineering
  - BTech in Chemical Engineering
  - BTech in Computer Science (CSE)
    - CSE in Artificial Intelligence
    - CSE in Blockchain
    - CSE in Data Science
    - CSE in Internet of Things
    - CSE in Machine Learning
    - CSE in Cloud Computing & Cyber Security
- Master of Technology (MTech)
  - MTech in Computer Science
  - MTech in Chemical Engineering
- Bachelor of Computer Science (BCA)
  - BCA in Data Science
  - BCA in Digital Marketing
- Bachelor of Computer Applications (BCA)
- Master of Computer Applications (MCA)

School of Business and Commerce

School of Business and Commerce

- Bachelor of Business Administration (BBA)
- Bachelor of Commerce (BCom)
- Master of Business Administration (MBA)
  - MBA in Finance
  - MBA in Human Resource Management
  - MBA in Marketing

School of Law

The School of Law offers two 5-year integrated programs:

- Bachelor of Arts and Bachelor of Legislative Law (BA - LLB)
- Bachelor of Business Administration and Bachelor of Legislative Law (BBA - LLB)
- Bachelor of Legislative Law (LLB)
- Master of Legislative Law (LLM)

School of Life and Allied Health Science

School of Life and Allied Health Science

- Bachelor of Science (BSc)
  - BSc in Agriculture
  - BSc in Biotechnology
  - BSc in Medical Lab Technology
  - BSc in Medical Microbiology
  - BSc in Microbiology

School of Pharmacy

School of Pharmacy

- Diploma in Pharmacy (DPharm)
- Bachelor of Pharmacy (BPharm)
- Master of Pharmacy (MPharm)

School of Nursing

School of Nursing

- Bachelor of Science (BSc) Nursing
- Auxiliary Nurse Midwife (ANM)

School of Paramedical

School of Paramedical

- Bachelor of Medical Laboratory Technology (BMLT)
- Bachelor of Science (BSc)
  - BSc in Optometric
  - BSc in Renal Dialysis

== Research Programs ==
Engineering and Technology

- Ph.D. Computer Science & Engineering
- Ph.D. Computer Science
- Ph.D. Electrical Engineering
- Ph.D. Mechanical Engineering
- Ph.D. Civil Engineering
- Ph.D. Electronics Communication Engineering

Arts & Humanities

- Ph.D. Hindi
- Ph.D. English
- Ph.D. Education
- Ph.D. Sociology
- Ph.D. Psychology
- Ph.D. Home Science
- Ph.D. Political Science
- Ph.D. Economics
- Ph.D. Social Work
- Ph.D. Geography

Commerce & Management

- Ph.D. Marketing
- Ph.D. Human Resource
- Ph.D. Finance
- Ph.D. Food Technology, Biotechnology
- Ph.D. Agriculture
- Ph.D. Pharmacy
- Ph.D. Law
- Ph.D. Management

Inactive schools

The former School of Education & Research previously awarded post-graduate degrees in Guidance and Counselling, Educational Management and Leadership, and Education.

The former School of Media & Cultural Studies previously awarded undergraduate and post-graduate degrees in Media Studies and Media/Cultural Studies.
