= Islamic Foundation Bangladesh =

Government organization in Bangladesh

- ইসলামিক ফাউন্ডেশন বাংলাদেশ
- Logo of Islamic Foundation Bangladesh

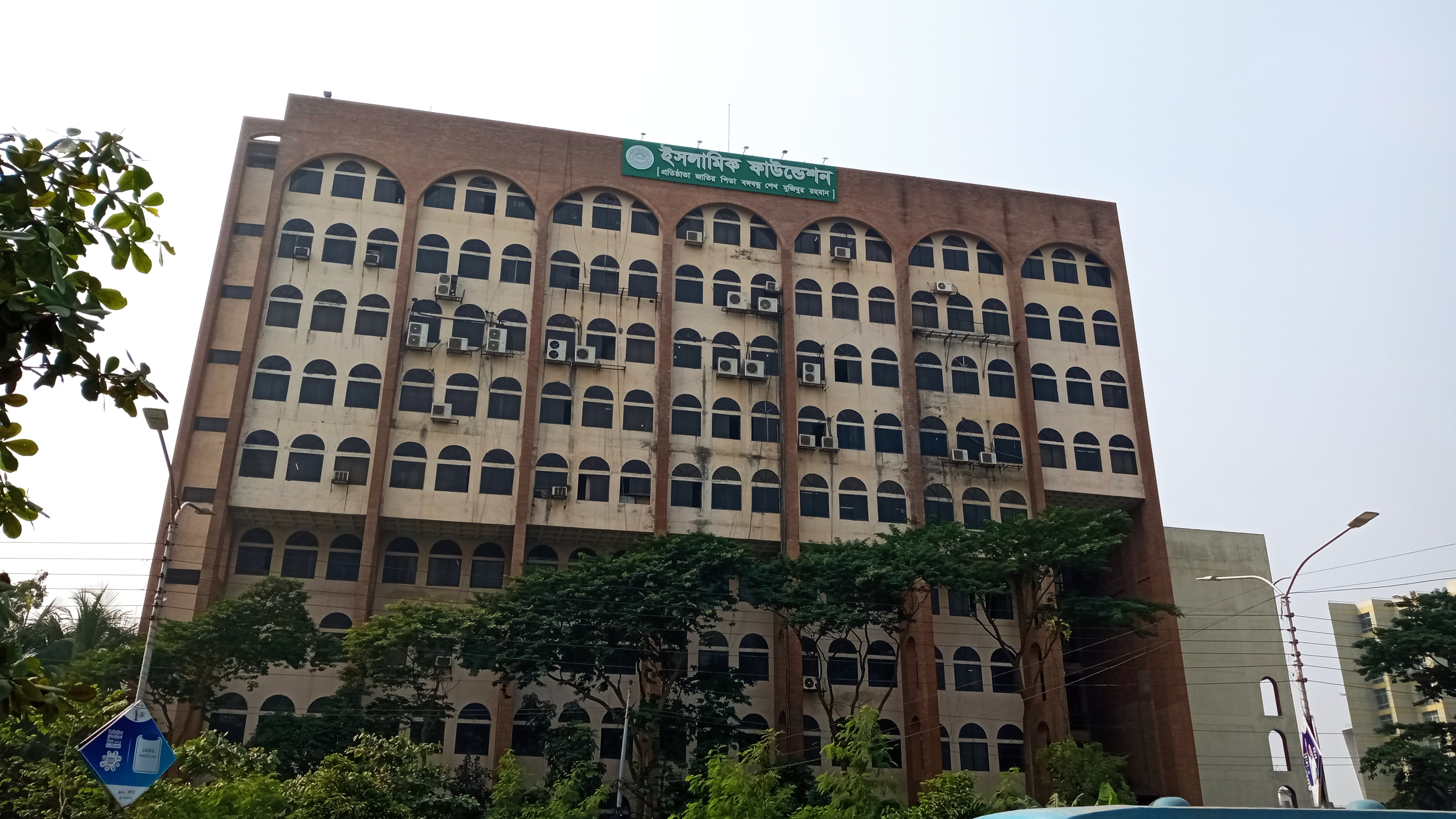
- Head office of Islamic Foundation Bangladesh
- Formation: 22 March 1975; 51 years ago
- Founder: Sheikh Mujibur Rahman
- Type: Government organization for Islamic education, publication, research, and religious activities under the MoRA
- Legal status: Statutory government body
- Purpose: To promote Islamic values, support mosques and Islamic institutions, undertake research and publications, and organize educational and community-based religious activities
- Headquarters: Islamic Foundation Bangladesh, Agargoan, Sher-e-Bangla Nagar, Dhaka, Bangladesh
- Region served: Bangladesh
- Official language: Bengali
- Religious Minister: Kazi Shah Mofazzal Hossain Kaikobad
- Director General: Mufti Muhibbullahil Baki Nadvi
- Secretary: Md. Saiful islam
- Deputy Director (Admin): Shah Muhammad Nazrul Islam
- Main organ: Government of Bangladesh
- Parent organization: Ministry of Religious Affairs
- Budget: Allocated by Government
- Staff: 1477
- Website: islamicfoundation.gov.bd

Islamic Foundation Bangladesh (Bengali: ইসলামিক ফাউন্ডেশন বাংলাদেশ) is a government organization under the Ministry of Religious Affairs in Bangladesh working to disseminate values and ideals of Islam and carry out activities related to those values and ideals. The head office of the foundation is in Dhaka, which is supported by 6 divisional offices and 64 district offices, as well as 7 Imam Training Academy Centers and 29 Islamic Mission Centers. The director general is the chief executive of the foundation.

== History ==
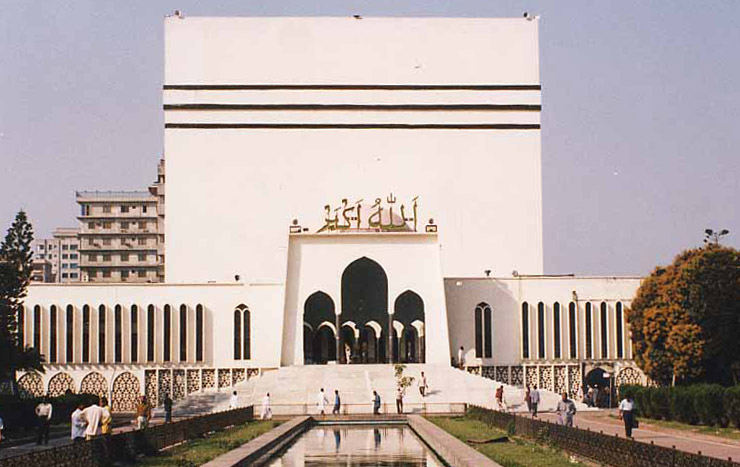
Baitul Mukarram National Mosque, Sub Office of the Islamic Foundation Bangladesh

In 1959, two organizations were formed in Dhaka, Bangladesh to propagate the teachings and following of Islam. The Baitul Mukarram Society built the Baitul Mukarram (Arabic: بيت المكرّم; the holy house) mosque and Islamic scholars formed a Darul Ulum (Arabic: دار العلوم; house of knowledge) to popularize and research on Islamic philosophy, culture and way of life. In 1960, the Darul Ulum was renamed as Islamic Academy and was made a branch of Central Institute of Islamic Research based in Karachi.

The current organization came into effect in 1974, when Sheikh Mujibur Rahman formally inaugurated as the Islamic Foundation.

On 20–22 March 1978, the foundation organized a seminar sponsored by the OIC and attended by representatives of 16 countries including Bangladesh. In 1979–80, development of the foundation got a new momentum.

== Controversy ==
In 2015, Islamic Foundation Bangladesh issued a fatwa banning the use of chairs for elderly worshipers in mosques. The head of the foundation, Shamim Afzal told Agence France-Presse, "There are no instances of the Prophet praying while sitting on a chair," despite numerous hadiths contradicting this claim. He added that "chairs spoiled the beauty of the mosques."

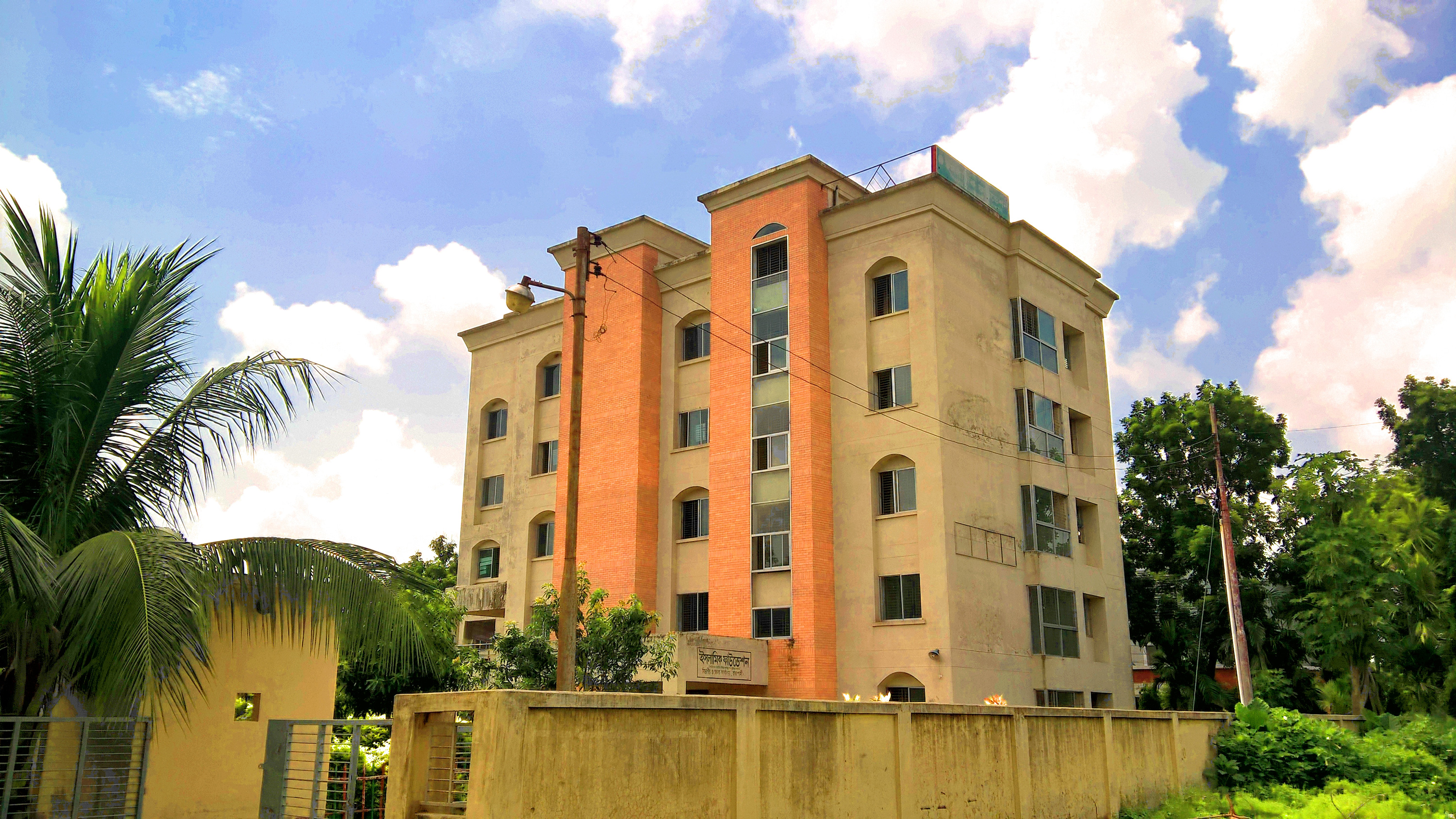
Islamic Foundation Bangladesh, Rajshahi Branch Office

This led to outrage and protest from more erudite ulema, who termed it "an incorrect and exaggerated decision." The Prime Minister Sheikh Hasina issued a statement that she was "stunned" by such a fatwa, terming it incorrect. She added that she herself offered prayers in chairs during flights.

== See also ==
- Bangladesh Madrasah Education Board
- Bangladesh Qawmi Madrasah Education Board
