= Faisal Kundi =

Governor of Khyber Pakhtunkhwa since 2025

Faisal Karim Kundi

35th Governor of Khyber Pakhtunkhwa
- Incumbent
- Assumed office 4 May 2024
- President: Asif Ali Zardari
- Prime Minister: Shehbaz Sharif
- Chief Minister: Ali Amin Gandapur; Sohail Afridi
- Preceded by: Haji Ghulam Ali

Special Assistant to the Prime Minister on Poverty Alleviation and Social Safety Division (Pakistan)
- In office 6 October 2022 – 10 August 2023
- Prime Minister: Shehbaz Sharif

Deputy Speaker of the National Assembly of Pakistan
- In office 19 March 2008 – 16 March 2013
- Speaker: Fahmida Mirza

Member of the National Assembly of Pakistan
- In office 17 March 2008 – 16 March 2013
- Preceded by: Fazal-ur-Rehman
- Succeeded by: Fazal-ur-Rehman
- Constituency: NA-24 (Dera Ismail Khan)

Personal details
- Born: 24 May 1975 (age 51) Dera Ismail Khan, North-West Frontier Province, Pakistan
- Party: Pakistan People’s Party (2002–present)
- Relations: Ahmad Kundi (brother)

Faisal Karim Kundi (Note: Urdu: فیصل کریم کنڈی; Pashto: فیصل کریم کنډي) (born 24 May 1975) is a Pakistani politician and businessman who is serving as the 35th governor of Khyber Pakhtunkhwa since 4 May 2024, ruling as the constitutional de facto administrator of Khyber Pakhtunkhwa since 11 October 2026 when the federal government removed Chief Minister Sohail Afridi by imposing governor's rule in the province.

Born in Dera Ismail Khan, he served as Deputy Speaker of the National Assembly of Pakistan from 19 March 2008 to 16 March 2013 and had been a Member of the National Assembly of Pakistan from 17 March 2008 to 16 March 2013. Further, he contested for the seat of the National Assembly five times and the seat of the Provincial Assembly of Khyber Pakhtunkhwa two times but remained unsuccessful. Kundi later held the position of Special Assistant to the Prime Minister on Poverty Alleviation and Social Safety in federal cabinet under Prime Minister Shehbaz Sharif.

== Early life and education ==
Kundi was born on 24 May 1975 in Dera Ismail Khan, North-West Frontier Province, Pakistan. His father Fazal Karim Kundi was a member of the National Assembly. The family belongs to the Kundi tribe of Niazi Pashtuns.

He completed his early education at St. Peter's High School in Karachi and attained his matriculation from St. Helen’s High School in Dera Ismail Khan. He earned a bachelor’s degree from the University of Punjab and later pursued an LLB degree at Thames Valley College, United Kingdom in 2002.

== Political career ==
Following his education, Kundi came back to Pakistan and began his political journey in 2001.

He contested for the seat of the National Assembly of Pakistan from Constituency NA-24 (Dera Ismail Khan) as a candidate of the Pakistan People's Party (PPP) in the 2002 Pakistani general election. However, he did not succeed in securing the seat. He garnered 36,891 votes but lost the seat to Fazal-ur-Rehman of Muttahida Majlis-e-Amal (MMA), who secured 43,124 votes.

=== Deputy Speaker of the National Assembly ===
He was elected to the National Assembly from Constituency NA-24 (Dera Ismail Khan) as a candidate of PPP in the 2008 Pakistani general election. He secured 83,560 votes, surpassing Fazal-ur-Rehman of MMA, who received 45,990 votes. This marked his inaugural election to the National Assembly. On 19 March 2008, he assumed the role of Deputy Speaker of the National Assembly of Pakistan and remained in this position until 16 March 2013. He received 246 votes, surpassing the 68 secured by Khushbakht Shujaat of the Muttahida Qaumi Movement (MQM). At the time of his appointment, he became the youngest Deputy Speaker of the National Assembly in Pakistan's history at the age of 33.

=== 2013 general election ===
In the 2013 Pakistani general election, he contested for seats in both the National Assembly from Constituency NA-24 (Dera Ismail Khan) as an independent candidate and from NA-25 (Dera Ismail Khan-cum-Tank) as a PPP candidate. But, he faced defeat in both constituencies. In NA-24, he received only 230 votes, losing to Fazal-ur-Rehman, a candidate from Jamiat Ulema-e-Islam (F) (JUI-F) who secured 92,395 votes. In NA-25, he garnered 46,262 votes but still lost to Fazal-ur-Rehman, a candidate from JUI-F who received 77,595 votes. Additionally, in the same election, he ran for a seat in the Provincial Assembly of Khyber Pakhtunkhwa from Constituency PK-66 (Dera Ismail Khan-III) as an independent candidate, but again faced defeat with only 98 votes. The seat was won by Maulana Lutfur Rehman of JUI-F.

In the by-election held in September 2013, he contested for the National Assembly seat from NA-25 (Dera Ismail Khan-cum-Tank) as a PPP candidate but suffered defeat once more, receiving only 358 votes. The seat was won by Dawar Khan Kundi of Pakistan Tehreek-e-Insaf (PTI), who garnered 73,754 votes. His electoral defeat in 2013 elections was attributed to his inability to fulfil promises and deliver progress in his constituency during his previous term.

In July 2015, he assumed the role of Information Secretary for PPP after being appointed.

=== Special Assistant to the Prime Minister ===
In the 2018 Pakistani general election, he contested seats for the National Assembly from three constituencies. In NA-37 (Tank), he received only 134 votes and lost to Asad Mehmood of MMA, who garnered 28,563 votes. In NA-38 (Dera Ismail Khan-1), he secured 20,681 votes but was defeated by Ali Amin Gandapur of PTI, who received 81,032 votes. Similarly, in NA-39 (Dera Ismail Khan-2), he received 271 votes and lost to Muhammad Yaqoob Sheikh of PTI, who received 79,672 votes.

Additionally, in the same election, he ran for a seat in the Provincial Assembly of Khyber Pakhtunkhwa from two constituencies. In PK-94 (Tank), he received only 17 votes and lost to Mahmood Ahmad Khan of MMA, who received 27,911 votes. In PK-96 (Dera Ismail Khan-2), he received 354 votes but lost to Ahmad Kundi of PPP, who secured 18,416 votes.

In January 2021, he was elected unopposed as Secretary of Information for the PPP during the party's intra-party elections.

On 14 September 2022, Prime Minister Shehbaz Sharif appointed him as a Special Assistant in his federal cabinet. On 6 October, he assumed responsibility for leading the Poverty Alleviation and Social Safety Division. He was granted the status of Minister of State on 9 December and served as Special Assistant to the Prime Minister on Poverty Alleviation and Social Safety until 10 August 2023.

=== Governor of Khyber Pakhtunkhwa ===
In the 2024 Pakistani general election, he contested for the seat of the National Assembly from constituency NA-44 (Dera Ismail Khan-I) as a candidate of PPP. He secured 35,567 votes but was defeated by Ali Amin Khan Gandapur of PTI, who received 93,443 votes.

After the election, PPP and Pakistan Muslim League (N) (PML-N) struck a power-sharing deal to establish a coalition government as none of the parties secured a simple majority. According to the PPP-PML-N agreement, PPP was assured various constitutional and executive positions, such as the presidency, Senate chairmanship, governorships of Khyber Pakhtunkhwa and Punjab, chief ministership of Balochistan, and deputy speakership of the National Assembly. Kundi was among the contenders considered for the governorship of Khyber Pakhtunkhwa. A senior PPP leader, known to be close to both Asif Ali Zardari and Bilawal Bhutto Zardari, indicated that Kundi is likely to be appointed to this position due to his track record of challenging not only the PTI but also the JUI-F in Khyber Pakhtunkhwa.

On 4 May 2024, President Asif Ali Zardari approved the appointment of Kundi as the 35th Governor of Khyber Pakhtunkhwa. Later on that same day, he took the oath of office as Governor. Chief Minister of Khyber Pakhtunkhwa Ali Amin Khan Gandapur called Kundi's oath-taking "illegal" and explained why he didn't attend the ceremony. He stated that he doesn't attend swearing-in ceremonies of those elected based on Form 47. According to a report, Constituency NA-44 (Dera Ismail Khan-I) was noted as a constituency where both the victor and the defeated candidate became "rulers". This was noted due to the case of Ali Amin Khan Gandapur, who emerged as the winner of the 2024 election and assumed the role of Chief Minister of Khyber Pakhtunkhwa and Kundi, who despite losing the election, was appointed as the Governor of the province.

Shortly after assuming office as governor, on 8 May, Kundi refrained from signing a summary proposed by the Government of Khyber Pakhtunkhwa to convene an assembly session. Consequently, the Government of Khyber Pakhtunkhwa had to request the assembly session through the Speaker of the Provincial Assembly of Khyber Pakhtunkhwa. In response, Chief Minister Ali Amin Gandapur cautioned Kundi to adhere to his constitutional role and warned that he could take action to remove Kundi from the Governor House if he continued to engage in political confrontations.

In July 2024, Chief Minister Ali Amin Gandapur issued a legal notice to Kundi and demanded Rs1 billion in damages and a full apology for allegations regarding Gandapur's involvement in approving the Operation Azm-e-Istehkam.

Following the Supreme Court's verdict on the redistribution of reserved seats reallocating them away from the PTI Faisal Karim Kundi addressed the media after the oath-taking ceremony of newly appointed MPAs. He revealed that a political understanding had been reached between the government and opposition on a 6-5 seat-sharing formula, with agreed allocations to JUI-F, PPP, and PML-N. Kundi stated that opposition candidates had withdrawn accordingly. However, the move has sparked criticism from Chief Minister Ali Amin Gandapur and other political functionaries, who have labelled the oath-taking process unconstitutional and vowed legal action against it.

== Corruption allegations ==
In 2012, a demonstration took place involving hundreds of activists, local leaders, and workers of the PPP from Dera Ismail Khan and Tank districts. The protest was directed against Kundi, with allegations of corruption related to the development funds allocated to Dera Ismail Khan. Protesters called for a National Accountability Bureau (NAB) inquiry into the operations of Kundi Construction Company and accused Kundi, along with his elder brother Ahmad Kundi, of involvement. Additionally, they claimed that aid intended for flood victims in Dera Ismail Khan and Tank was mishandled by Kundi. Among their demands was the resignation of Kundi from his position as divisional president of the PPP.

In 2016, the NAB initiated an investigation against Kundi concerning the allocation of a plot for a cinema in Islamabad. Reports suggested that during Kundi's tenure as Deputy Speaker of the National Assembly, he allocated the plot to individuals employed as his servants.

According to a report in April 2013, Kundi disclosed ownership of 2310 kanals of farmland in 2012 but had not paid any taxes since 2010.
