= Ghulam Qadir Khan Bhittani =

Pakistani politician

Ghulam Qadir Khan Bhittani MPA
- غلام قادر خان بیٹنی

Member of the Provincial Assembly of Khyber Pakhtunkhwa
- In office 2011–2013
- Constituency: PK-69 (Tank)

Personal details
- Born: 15 February 1968 (age 58)
- Party: Pakistan Tehreek-e-Insaf (2023-present)
- Other political affiliations: Awami National Party (2018-2023); Pakistan People's Party (2013-2018); Jamiat Ulema-e-Islam (F) (2011-2013)
- Children: Mohammad Usman (son)
- Occupation: Politician

Ghulam Qadir Khan Bhittani is a Pakistani politician from Tank District, who served as a member of the Khyber Pakhtunkhwa Assembly from 2011 to 2013 belong to the Jamiat Ulema-e-Islam (F) (JUI-F).

== Political career ==
He was elected to the Provincial Assembly of the North-West Frontier Province a 2011 by-election from PF-69 Tank as a candidate of Jamiat Ulema-e-Islam (F) (JUI-F). He received 16,319 votes and defeated Dawar Khan Kundi, a candidate of Pakistan People's Party (PPP).

He contested the 2013 Khyber Pakhtunkhwa provincial election from PK-69 Tank as a candidate of PPP, but was unsuccessful. He received 16,249 votes and was defeated by Mahmood Ahmad Khan, a candidate of JUI-F.

He contested the 2018 Khyber Pakhtunkhwa provincial election from PK-94 Tank as a candidate of Awami National Party (ANP), but was unsuccessful. He received 15,725 votes and was defeated by Mahmood Ahmad Khan, a candidate of Muttahida Majlis-e-Amal (MMA).
