= Abdur Razzaq Iskander =

Pakistani Muslim scholar and writer (1935–2021)

Shaykh al-Hadith Mawlānā Abdur Razzaq Iskander
- عبدالرزاق اسکندر

4th Chancellor of Jamia Uloom-ul-Islamia
- In office 2 November 1997 – 30 June 2021
- Preceded by: Habibullah Mukhtar
- Succeeded by: Sulaiman Yousuf Banuri

8th Emir of Aalmi Majlis Tahaffuz Khatm-e-Nubuwwat
- In office 2015 – 30 June 2021
- Preceded by: Abdul Majeed Ludhianvi
- Succeeded by: Nasiruddin Khakwani

7th President of Wifaq ul Madaris Al-Arabia, Pakistan
- In office 5 October 2017 – 30 June 2021
- Preceded by: Saleemullah Khan
- Succeeded by: Taqi Usmani

9th Vice President of Wifaq ul Madaris Al-Arabia, Pakistan
- In office 30 September 2001 – 5 October 2017
- Preceded by: Hasan Jan
- Succeeded by: Anwar-ul-Haq Haqqani

5th president of Iqra Rozatul Atfal Trust
- Preceded by: Abdul Majeed Ludhianvi
- Succeeded by: unknown

Personal life
- Born: 1935 Kokal, NWFP, British India
- Died: 30 June 2021 (aged 85–86) Karachi, Sindh, Pakistan
- Education: Darul Uloom Karachi; Jamia Uloom-ul-Islamia; Islamic University of Madinah; Al-Azhar University

Religious life
- Religion: Islam
- Denomination: Sunni
- Jurisprudence: Hanafi
- Movement: Deobandi

Muslim leader
- Teacher: Abdul Rasheed Nomani

Abdur Razzaq Iskander (1935 – 30 June 2021; Urdu: عبد الرزاق اسکندر) was a Pakistani Islamic scholar and writer. He was the chancellor and senior professor of hadith at Jamia Uloom-ul-Islamia, emir of the Aalmi Majlis Tahaffuz Khatm-e-Nubuwwat and the president of Wifaqul Madaris in Pakistan.

He was an alumnus of Darul Uloom Karachi, Jamia Uloom-ul-Islamia, Islamic University of Madinah and Al-Azhar University.

He authored books such as At-Tarīqat al-Asriyyah and Tahafuzz-e-Madāris.

== Biography ==
Abdur Razzaq was born in 1935 into a religious family in Kokal, Abbottabad District. He was educated at the Madrassa Darul Uloom Chohar Sharif, Haripur and the Ahmed Al-Madrassa Sikandarpur. He later studied at the Darul Uloom Karachi and graduated in the dars-e-nizami from the Jamia Uloom-ul-Islamia in 1956. He was the first student of dars-e-nizami at the Jamia Uloom-ul-Islamia. He later enrolled at the Islamic University of Madinah in 1962 and studied theology for four years. He completed his doctoral studies at the Al-Azhar University in 1972. He was an authorized disciple of Muhammad Yusuf Ludhianvi in Tasawwuf. His teachers include Muhammad Yousuf Banuri and Wali Hasan Tonki.

Abdur Razzaq started his teaching career in 1955. He became the Shaykh al-Hadith (senior professor of hadith) of the Jamia Uloom-ul-Islamia after Nizamuddin Shamzai, and the chancellor after the assassination of Habibullah Mukhtar in 1997. He was made a member of the working committee of the Wifaq ul Madaris in 1997 and appointed its vice-president in 2001. He later served as its interim president for nine months following the death of Saleemullah Khan. He was appointed the president on 5 October 2017.

In 1981, he was elected a member of the executive council of the Aalmi Majlis Tahaffuz Khatm-e-Nubuwwat (AMTKN). In 2008, he was appointed the central deputy-emir following Sayed Nafees al-Hussaini's death. In 2015, he succeeded Abdul Majeed Ludhianvi as the emir of AMTKN. He also served as the president of Ittehad-e-Tanzeemat-Madaris Pakistan.

In August 2016, speaking to a congregation at the Birmingham Central Mosque, Abdur Razzaq said that, "Islam is complete and it means that nothing can be added, removed or altered in it". He maintained that the people opposing the finality of prophethood have disconnected themselves from Muhammad.

Abdur Razzaq died on 30 June 2021 in Karachi. His death was condoled by Qamar Javed Bajwa, Shehbaz Sharif, Fazal-ur-Rehman, Shujaat Hussain, Chaudhry Pervaiz Elahi, Imran Ismail, Syed Mustafa Kamal and Anis Kaimkhani.

== Literary works ==
Literary works of Abdur Razzaq include:

- At-Tarīqat al-Asriyyah (2 parts), this book is included in the curriculum of Wifaqul Madaris.
- Mushāhidāt va tāʼas̲s̲urāt : ʻālam-i Islām kī cand ʻaẓīm shak̲h̲ṣiyyāt kā taz̲kirah
- Taḥaffuz̤-i madāris aur ʻulmāʼ va t̤ulabāʼ se chand bāten̲
- Tablighi Jamaat and Principles and Methodology of its Dawah

== See more ==
- List of Deobandis
