= NA-44 Dera Ismail Khan-I =

Constituency of the National Assembly of Pakistan

- Constituency for the National Assembly of Pakistan
- Region: Paharpur Tehsil, D.I Khan Tehsil (partly) including D.I Khan City and Cantonment area in Dera Ismail Khan District
- Electorate: 391,882

Current constituency
- Party: Pakistan Tehreek-e-Insaf
- Member: Faisal Amin Khan Gandapur
- Created from: NA-38 D.I.Khan

NA-44 Dera Ismail Khan-I (این اے-44، ڈیرا اسماعیل خان-I) is a constituency for the National Assembly of Pakistan.

== Members of Parliament ==
=== 1977–2002: NA-24 Dera Ismail Khan ===
Election	Member	Party
1977	Maulvi M. Wali Khan	PPP
1985	Shahzada Mohiuddin	Independent
1988	Syed Abdul Ghafoor Shah	PPP
1990	Shahzada Mohiuddin	IJI
1993	Maulana Abdul Rahim	PIF
1997	Shahzada Mohiuddin	PML-N

=== 2002–2018: NA-24 Dera Ismail Khan ===
Election	Member	Party
2002	Maulana Fazal-ur-Rehman	MMA
2008	Faisal Karim Kundi	PPPP
2013	Molana Fazal-ur-Rehman	JUI (F)
by-election 2013	Dawar Khan Kundi	PTI

=== 2018–2023: NA-38 Dera Ismail Khan-I ===
Election	Member	Party
2018	Ali Amin Gandapur	PTI

=== 2024–present: NA-44 Dera Ismail Khan-I ===
Election	Member	Party
2024 by-election	Faisal Amin Khan Gandapur	PTI

== Elections since 2002 ==
=== 2002 general election ===
2002 General Election: NA-24 D.I. Khan
Party	Candidate	Votes	%	±%
MMA	Fazal-ur-Rahman	43,124	38.99	
PPPP	Faisal Karim Kundi	36,891	33.35	
PML-Q	Al-haj Sanaullah Khan Miankhel	26,860	24.29	
Independent	Atta-ur-Rehman	1,981	1.79	
National Alliance	Javed Hassan Laghari	774	0.70	
PAT	Abdul Aziz	492	0.44	
Pak Watan	Abid Hussain Chughtai	486	0.44	
Majority		6,233	5.64	
Turnout		110,608	42.26	
MMA gain from PML (N)				

A total of 2,445 votes were rejected.

=== 2008 general election ===
2008 General Election: NA-24 D.I. Khan
Party	Candidate	Votes	%	±%
PPPP	Faisal Karim Kundi	83,560	60.28	+26.93
MMA	Fazal-ur-Rahman	45,990	33.17	−5.82
Pakistan Bachao Party	Abdul Aziz Khan	2,744	1.98	
PML-N	Hizbullah Gandapur	2,155	1.55	
Independent	Ahmad Kundi	1,964	1.42	
Independent	Ikramullah Gandapur	710	0.51	
MQM	Mohammad Zubair Anjum	642	0.46	
Independent	Sardar Umar Farooaq Khan Miankhel	478	0.35	
Independent	Mati Ullah Baloch Advocate	388	0.28	
Majority		37,570	27.11	
Turnout		138,631	41.14	−1.12
PPPP gain from MMA				

A total of 4,287 votes were rejected.

=== 2013 general election ===
2013 General Election: NA-24 D.I. Khan
Party	Candidate	Votes	%	±%
JUI-F	Fazal-ur-Rehman	92,395	43.98	
PPPP	Waqar Ahmed Khan	67,769	32.26	−28.02
PTI	Mustafa Kundi	21,394	10.18	
PML-N	Rehan Malik Advocate	8,501	4.05	+2.50
Independent	Alhaj Khizer Hayat Diyal	5,215	2.48	
Independent	Waseem Rehan Advocate	2,132	1.01	
Independent	Ubaid Ur Rehman	1,379	0.66	
Independent	Alhaj Sardar Umar Farooq Khan	1,293	0.62	
TTP	Moin Ud Din	1,117	0.53	
Independent	Alhaj Malik Ghulam Ali Esar	1,052	0.50	
Independent	Abdul Aziz	904	0.43	
Pakistan Sariaki Party	Faqir Jamshid Ahmad	868	0.41	
MDM	Khalifa Abdul Qayyum	749	0.36	
MQM	Junaid Tariq Qureshi Advocate	697	0.33	−0.13
Independent	Syed Zameer Ul Hasnain Shah	697	0.33	
Independent	Maddo Jan	666	0.32	
APML	Malik Nisar Ahmad Thind	558	0.27	
Independent	Malik Arshad Diyal	478	0.23	
JI	Zahid Mohibullah Khan Advocate	392	0.19	
Independent	Mohammad Jibran Shah	270	0.13	
Independent	Faisal Karim Kundi	230	0.11	
Independent	Akram Rasti Gandapur	163	0.08	
Independent	Saif Ur Rehman	145	0.07	
Independent	Shahid Atta Khiyra	144	0.07	
Independent	Mohammad Haroon Awan Advocate	126	0.06	
Independent	Javed Hussan Laghari	116	0.06	
Independent	Mussarat Shaheen	99	0.05	
PML-J	Muhammad Fiaz Qadri	94	0.04	
Independent	Muhammad Akmal	93	0.04	
Independent	Ahmad Karim Kundi	91	0.04	
Independent	Pir Tufail Ahmad Jan Zakori	91	0.04	
Independent	Dawar Khan Kundi	80	0.04	
Independent	Engineer Sher Zaman	67	0.03	
Majority		24,626	11.72	
Turnout		210,065	56.14	+15.00
JUI (F) gain from PPPP				

A total of 10,510 votes were rejected.

=== 2018 general election ===
General elections were held on 25 July 2018.

General election 2018: NA-38 Dera Ismail Khan-I
Party	Candidate	Votes	%	±%
PTI	Ali Amin Gandapur	80,236	38.88	
MMA	Fazal-ur-Rehman	45,457	22.03	
PPP	Faisal Karim Kundi	20,429	9.90	
Independent	Waqar Ahmed Khan	18,788	9.10	
Independent	Muhammad Ali Raza	15,070	7.30	
Independent	Syed Husnain Mohyuddin Gillani	7,904	3.83	
TLP	Hafeezullah	6,122	2.97	
Independent	Dawar Khan Kundi	3,774	1.83	
Independent	Hameedullah Khan Qadri	3,588	1.74	
Independent	Chaudhary Sirajuddin	2,018	0.98	
Others	Others (five candidates)	2,973	1.44	
Turnout		214,653	54.82	
Total valid votes		206,359	96.14	
Rejected ballots		8,294	3.86	
Majority		34,779	16.85	
Registered electors		391,557		
PTI gain from JUI (F)				

=== 2024 general election ===
General elections were held on 8 February 2024. Ali Amin Gandapur won the election with 92,161 votes. He later vacated the seat in favour of PK-113 Dera Ismail Khan-III to become the Chief Minister of Khyber Pakhtunkhwa.

General election 2024: NA-44 Dera Ismail Khan-I
Party	Candidate	Votes	%	±%
PTI	Ali Amin Gandapur (Note: Filed nomination papers as PTI candidate but ECP allowed him to run as an Independent)	92,161	44.17	▲5.29
JUI (F)	Fazal-ur-Rehman	59,585	28.56	N/A
PPP	Faisal Karim Kundi	35,248	16.89	▲6.99
TLP	Muhammad Shafiq Ul Hai	9,315	4.46	▲1.49
PTI-P	Syed Muhammad Jawad Asghar Shah	4,064	1.95	
PML(N)	Waqar Ahmed Khan	1,648	0.79	▼8.39
ANP	Khurram Shehzad	1,231	0.59	
JI	Muhammad Yousaf Khan	1,167	0.56	
IPP	Mehnaz Ali	1,095	0.52	
Others	Others (eleven candidates)	3,150	1.51	
Turnout		215,399	54.97	▲0.15
Total valid votes		208,644	96.86	▲0.72
Rejected ballots		6,735	3.14	
Majority		32,576	15.61	▼1.24
Registered electors		391,882		

=== 2024 by-election ===
A by-election was held on 21 April 2024 due to the vacancy by Ali Amin Gandapur.

2024 Pakistani by-elections: NA-44 Dera Ismail Khan-I
Party	Candidate	Votes	%	±%
SIC	Faisal Amin Khan Gandapur	66,879	70.06	
PPP	Rashid Khan Kundi	21,979	23.03	
TLP	Akhtar Saeed	2,289	2.40	
PML(N)	Zameer Hussain	1,353	1.42	
Others	Others (15 Candidates)	2,946	3.09	
Turnout		97,155	24.50	
Total valid votes		95,446	98.24	
Rejected ballots		1,709	1.76	
Majority		44,900	47.03	
Registered electors		396,613		

== See also ==
- NA-43 Tank-cum-Dera Ismail Khan
- NA-45 Dera Ismail Khan-II
