= Abdul Majeed Ludhianvi =

Pakistani islamic scholar

Maulana Abdul Majeed Ludhianvi
- مولانا عبدالمجید لدھیانوی

Personal life
- Born: 5 June 1934 Salempur, Punjab, British India
- Died: 1 February 2015 (aged 80) Multan, Punjab, Pakistan
- Cause of death: Heart attack
- Parent: Hafiz Muhammad Yousuf (father)
- Education: Jamia Qasim Ul Uloom

Religious life
- Religion: Islam
- Denomination: Sunni
- Movement: Aalmi Majlis Tahaffuz Khatm-e-Nubuwwat
- Profession: Islamic scholar, writer

Muslim leader
- Teacher: Mufti Mahmud; Sayed Nafees al-Hussaini

7th Emir of Aalmi Majlis Tahaffuz Khatm-e-Nubuwwat
- In office 2010 – 1 February 2015
- Preceded by: Khawaja Khan Muhammad
- Succeeded by: Abdur Razzaq Iskander

4th president of Iqra Rozatul Atfal Trust
- Preceded by: Sayed Nafees al-Hussaini
- Succeeded by: Abdur Razzaq Iskander

Abdul Majeed Ludhianvi (5 June 1934 – 1 February 2015; Urdu: مولانا عبدالمجید لدھیانوی) was a Pakistani Islamic scholar and writer who served as 7th Emir of Aalmi Majlis Tahaffuz Khatm-e-Nubuwwat and a senior member of the executive committee of Wifaq ul Madaris Al-Arabia, Pakistan

== Early life and education ==
Ludhianvi was born to Hafiz Muhammad Yusuf in 1934 in an Arain family in Salempur Jagraon Tehsil, Ludhiana district. His father was a pious man and a middle-class landowner and farmer. He got his early education from Government High School at Salempur. During the eighth grade, it was decided the partition of India. He moved to Pakistan with his parents and settled in Shorkot and passed the middle school examination here. After that in 1949 he entered Jamia Darul Uloom Rabbania in Toba Tek Singh, to get religious education. After two years, he enrolled in Madrasa Ashraf Al-Rasheed in Faisalabad. Meanwhile, he married into a family living in Kamalia. Then he entered Jamia Qasim-ul-Uloom Multan and graduated from Dars-i Nizami in 1956. He studied Bukhari and Tirmidhi from Maulana Abdul Khaliq, a student of Mahmud Hasan Deobandi, and Sahih Muslim from Mufti Mahmood. He also had the permission of Hadith from Zakariyya Kandhlawi, Muhammad Idris Kandhlawi and Muhammad Yousuf Banuri.

== Career ==
After the demise of Khawaja Khan Muhammad in 2010, he was elected Amir of the Aalmi Majlis Tahaffuz Khatm-e-Nubuwwat. He also served as 4th president of Iqra Rozatul Atfal Trust.

== Literary works ==
- Tibyan ul Furqan (6. Vol)
- Khutbaat e Hakeem ul Asar (12. Vol)

== Death ==
He died on 1 February 2015 of a heart attack at a seminar of the Wifaq ul Madaris Al-Arabia at Multan. His funeral prayer was led by Saleemullah Khan. Nawaz Sharif (then Prime Minister), Shahbaz Sharif (then Chief Minister) and Maulana Fazlur Rehman have offered condolences on his death.

== See more ==
- List of Deobandis
