= Khawaja Khan Muhammad =

Pakistani islamic scholar

- خواجہ خان محمد

Emir of Aalmi Majlis Tahaffuz Khatm-e-Nubuwwat
- In office 1971–2010
- Preceded by: Muhammad Yousuf Banuri

Personal life
- Born: 1916 Mianwali District, British Raj
- Died: 5 May 2010 (aged 94) Multan, Punjab, Pakistan
- Children: Kalsoom Ahmad Sahibzada Rasheed Ahmad 4 more sons
- Parent: Khawaja Umar (father)
- Citizenship: British Indian (1916–1947); Pakistani (1947–2010)
- Political party: Jamiat Ulema-e-Islam; Majlis-e-Ahrar-ul-Islam
- Education: Darul Uloom Deoband; Jamiah Islamiah Talimuddin Dabhel

Religious life
- Religion: Islam
- Denomination: Sunni
- Jurisprudence: Hanafi
- Tariqa: Naqshbandi
- Movement: Deobandi
- Ordination: Dar-ul-Aloom Deoband, India

Muslim leader
- Teacher: Muhammad Yousuf Banuri; Hussain Ahmad Madani

Maulana Khawaja Khan Muhammad (Urdu: مولانا خواجہ خان محمد; 1916 - 5 May 2010) was a Pakistani Islamic scholar, who served as the Ameer of the Aalmi Majlis Tahaffuz Khatm-e-Nubuwwat.

== Early life and education ==
Khawaja Khan Muhammad was born in 1916 in Mianwali District to Khawaja Umar Sahib. He attended school to the sixth grade, then he studied Quran and early religious books at Khanqah Sirajia Kundian. He went to Jamiah Islamiah Talimuddin Dabhel for further education. Then he went to Darul Uloom Deoband to complete his studies. Apart from Izaz Ali Amrohi and other eminent teachers, he also got the honor of being a special student of Shaykh-ul-Islam Hazrat Maulana Syed Hussain Ahmad Madani.

== Career ==
After graduating from Darul Uloom Deoband in 1941, he returned to the Khanqah Sirajia Kundian and began teaching there. He served Khanqah Sirajia as principal for about sixty years till his death. He also served as Emir of the Aalmi Majlis Tahaffuz Khatm-e-Nubuwwat after the death of Muhammad Yousuf Banuri in 1977. He used to perform Hajj almost every year, so far he has performed about 65 Hajj.

He died in Multan due to severe Jaundice on Wednesday 5 May 2010 after Maghrib prayers. His funeral prayers were offered by his son and successor Hazret Khawja Abu Saad Khalil Ahmed, which was attended by millions of people from across the country, and was buried next to his mentor Hazret Maulana Abdullah Ludhianvi r.a in the Khanqah Sarajia cemetery.

The funeral was attended by many scholars like Maulana Fazlur Rehman, then Federal Minister Atta-ur-Rehman, Ubaidur Rahman Zia, Taqi Usmani, Saleemullah Khan, Abdur Razzaq Iskander, Abdul Ghafoor Haideri and Rafi Usmani, Syed Muhammad Kafeel Bukhari, Maulana Amjad Khan, Hafiz Hussain Ahmed, Abdul Latif Khalid Cheema, Muhammad Hanif Jalandhari, Gul Naseeb Khan and Qari Fayyaz-ur-Rehman Alvi. Punjab Assembly member Ali Haider Noor Khan Niazi representing then Punjab Chief Minister Muhammad Shahbaz Sharif attended the funeral prayer and also laid a wreath on the grave.
