= Mufti Mehmood =

Pakistani politician (1919–1980)

Sheikh al-Hadith Mufti Mehmood-ur-Rehman
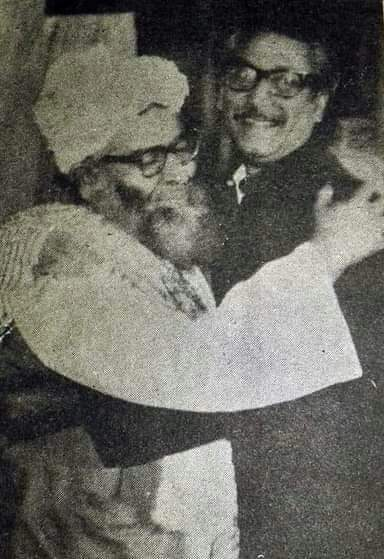
- Mahmud (in left) pictured with President of Bangladesh Sheikh Mujibur Rahman

8th Chief Minister of the North-West Frontier Province
- In office 1 March 1972 – 15 February 1973
- Governor: Arbab Sikandar Khan; Aslam Khattak
- Preceded by: Sardar Bahadur Khan
- Succeeded by: Inayatullah Khan Gandapur

General Secretary of Jamiat Ulema-e-Islam
- In office 1968–1980
- Preceded by: Maulana Ghulam Ghaus Hazarvi
- Succeeded by: Maulana Fazl-ur-Rehman (later elected as the President)

President of Wafaq ul Madaris Al-Arabia, Pakistan
- In office 15 May 1978 – 14 October 1980
- Preceded by: Muhammad Yousuf Banuri
- Succeeded by: Muhammad Idrees Mirti

Member of the National Assembly of Pakistan
- In office 26 March 1977 – 5 July 1977
- Constituency: NA-18 (D.I. Khan)
- In office 14 April 1972 – 10 January 1977
- Constituency: NW-13 (D.I. Khan)
- In office 8 June 1962 – 7 June 1965
- Constituency: NW-6 (D.I. Khan-I)

Muhtamim of Jamia Qasim-ul-Uloom
- In office 1974–1980
- Preceded by: Maulana Muhammad Shafi Multani
- Succeeded by: Maulana Faiz Ahmed

Personal details
- Born: 9 June 1919 (6 Rabi Us Sani 1337) Panyala, NWFP, British India (now KPK, Pakistan)
- Died: 14 October 1980 (aged 61) Karachi, Sindh, Pakistan
- Resting place: Abdul Khel, DI Khan, KPK
- Party: Jamiat Ulema-e-Islam
- Children: Maulana Fazal-ur-Rehman; Maulana Lutf ur Rehman; Maulana Atta-ur-Rehman; Eng. Zia ur Rahman; Ubaid ur Rahman
- Education: Madrasa Shahi, Moradabad
- Occupation: Politician; Scholar; Teacher

Mufti Mehmood-ur-Rehman (Urdu: مفتی محمود الرحمان; 1919–1980) was a Pakistani Islamic scholar and statesman who was one of the founding members of the Jamiat Ulema-e-Islam (JUI). He served as the first elected Chief Minister of Khyber Pakhtunkhwa, and later on as the Leader of the Opposition in National Assembly.

He led the opposition movement Pakistan National Alliance against Zulfiqar Ali Bhutto, which eventually led to Bhutto's downfall. He was among the principal architects of the 1973 Constitution of Pakistan.

== Early life and career ==
Born in January 1919, he was born into the ethnic Nasar Pashtun tribe from Panyala, Dera Ismail Khan District, colonial India (now Pakistan). His father, Maulana Khalifa Muhammad Siddiq, was a religious scholar and had permissions in all four orders of the Sufi Tariqa.

He received his religious education at Madrasa Shahi, Moradabad, UP and graduated from the Darul Uloom Deoband.

In 1941, he worked as a teacher in Isakhel, Mianwali. On the advice of his teacher Muhammad Miyan Deobandi he settled down in Abdul Khel, a town in Dera Ismail Khan, and married into a Marwat Pashtun family there.

At the time of the Indian independence movement Mufti Mahmud opposed the partition of colonial India with the Indian National Congress and opposed the creation of Pakistan.

== In Pakistan ==
He served as a Muhtamim at Jamia Qasim-ul-Uloom in Multan and later in his career, he also held the positions of Chief Mudarras in charge of education, Chief Mufti, and Sheikh al-Hadith. He issued at least 25,000 Fatwas in his lifetime and his students included Maulana Abdullah Ghazi, Abdul Majeed Ludhianvi and Noor Muhammad.

Mufti Mahmud was a critic of family planning programme of Ayub Khan's government. He participated in the elections for the National Assembly for the first time under Ayub Khan's 'Basic Democracy Program' and defeated all his opponents in 1962.

He also opposed the 'One Unit Scheme'.On 8 January 1968, in Dacca, then in East Pakistan, Mufti Mahmud was one of the key leaders of Jamhoori Majlis-e-Amal that opposed Ayub Khan's regime. In the 1970 general election, Mufti Mahmud had a landslide victory against Zulfiqar Ali Bhutto in the Dera Ismail Khan constituency.

After the 1970 general election in Pakistan, he became the president of Jamiat Ulema-e-Islam founded by Maulana Shabir Ahmed Usmani. His party went into a coalition with the National Awami Party for the 1970 Pakistani general election. In the 1970s, the Jamiat Ulema-e-Islam received significant funding from Saudi Arabia.

On 1 March 1972, he was elected as the chief minister of the province of Khyber-Pakhtunkhwa during the Zulfiqar Ali Bhutto government in Pakistan.

During his tenure as chief minister, he instituted many reforms, such as prohibition against alcohol, making Urdu as the official language in government offices, ban on interest in financial transactions and declared Friday as the official holiday in his province.

Mufti Mahmud played a vital role in Tehreek-e-Khatme Nabuwwat, a religious movement which has highlighted the beliefs of the followers of Mirza Ghulam Ahmad in Pakistan, in 1953 and again in 1974. He led a team of Islamic scholars which worked for the declaration of Ahmadis as non-Muslims in 1974.

He and his cabinet resigned in protest at the dismissal of the NAP–JUI coalition government in Balochistan on 14 February 1973.

He vowed to launch an anti-government movement, and first formed the UDF (United Democratic Front), and later on Pakistan National Alliance: the largest opposition movement in the history of Pakistan against Zulfiqar Ali Bhutto. In 1977, the Pakistan National Alliance launched nationwide street agitation against the rigging of Bhutto in 1977 General Elections. The same year Bhutto was removed in a Coup d'etat by Zia ul Haq.

Towards the end of his life, he continued his endeavours for democracy, and in 1980 had started negotiations with his arch-rival PPP, for a joint struggle against dictatorship.

He supported the Afghan jihad against the USSR in 1979.

== Death and legacy ==
He died on 14 October 1980, in Karachi, Sindh at the age of 61. He was buried in Abdul Khel, Dera Ismail Khan District. His eldest son among the five, Maulana Fazal-ur-Rehman is a politician who leads the Jamiat Ulema-e-Islam (JUI) party in Pakistan.

Remembered not only for his 'principled’ politics legal, and scholastic legacy includes establishing the renowned seminary Jamia Qasim Ul Uloom, and his proverbial verdicts compiled as Fatāvʹa Muftī Maḥmūd. His numerous pupils are active in politics and as scholars including:

- Maulana Musa Bazi Al Bazi
- Maulana Abdullah Ghazi
- Maulana Allah Wasaya
- Ahmed Ludhianvi
- Maulana Abdul Kareem Nadeem

== Bibliography ==
=== Books by him ===
- Tafsīr-i Maḥmūd, translation of and commentary on the Qur'an, in 3 volumes
- Fatāvʹa Muftī Maḥmūd, his fatwas, in 11 volumes
- Az̲ān-i saḥar: Maulānā Muftī Maḥmūd ke inṭerviyuz aur taqārīr kā majmūʻah, collected speeches and interviews
- K̲h̲ut̤bāt-i Maḥmūd: majmūʻah-yi taqārīr-i mufakkir-i Islām, Maulānā Muftī Maḥmūd, collection of his speeches

=== Books about him ===
- Savāniḥ-i ḥayāt: Muftī Maḥmūd, vazīr-i aʻlá-yi Sarḥad, janral sekraṭrī Jamʻiyat-i ʻUlamāʼ-yi Islām, Pākistān by Ziya ur-Rahman Faruqi, 1972
- Muftī Maḥmūd kī siyāsat by Nūrulḥaq Quraishī, 1974
- Maulānā Mufti Mahmūd by Naʻim Āsī, 1977
- Maulānā Muftī Maḥmūd ... kī siyāsī zindagī by Gul Nāyāb K̲h̲ān Citrālī, 2002
- Mufakkir-i Islām, qāʼid-i Islāmī inqilāb Maulānā Muftī Maḥmūd ... ek darvesh siyāsatdān by Sayyid Anvar Qidvāʼī, 2003
- Savāniḥ qāʼid-i millat Ḥaẓrat Maulānā Muftī Maḥmūd by ʻAbdulqayyūm Ḥaqqānī, 2003
- Muftī Maḥmūd kā daur-i ḥukūmat by Ashfāq Hāshmī, 2004
- Maulānā Muftī Maḥmūd ke ḥairat angez vāqiʻāt by Momin K̲h̲ān ʻUs̲mānī, 2009
- Muftī-yi Aʻẓam Maulānā Muftī Maḥmūd kī ʻilmī, dīnī aur siyāsī k̲h̲idmāt by ʻAbdulḥakīm Akbarī, 2010
- Afkār-i Maḥmūd : Shaik̲h̲ulhind Maulānā Maḥmūd Ḥasan va mufakkir-i Islām Maulānā Muftī Maḥmūd kī ḥayāt o k̲h̲idmāt kā ḥasīn tazkirah by Muḥammad Fārūq Quraishī, 2017

== See also ==
- Jamiat Ulema-e-Islam (F)
- Chief Minister of Khyber Pakhtunkhwa

== Bibliography ==
- Haq, Abdul; Qadoos, Hafiz Abdul (2022). "Style and characteristics of Mufti Mehmood's tafseer "Tafseer e Mehmood". Rahat-ul-Quloob (in Urdu). 6 (2): 157–168. doi:10.51411/rahat.6.2.2022/426 (inactive 12 July 2025). ISSN 2521-2869.
- Manan, Qazi Abdul; Achakzai, Abdul Ali (2022). "The thinker of islam, Mulana Mufti Mahmood's role in the movement for khatam-e Nabuwat". Rahat-ul-Quloob (in Urdu). 6 (1): 188–198. doi:10.51411/rahat.6.1.2022/403 (inactive 12 July 2025). ISSN 2521-2869.

Political offices
Preceded by Sardar Bahadur Khan	Chief Minister of Khyber-Pakhtunkhwa; 1972 – 1973	Succeeded by Inayatullah Gandapur
Party political offices
Preceded by Maulana Abdullah Darkhawasti	Ameer of Jamiat Ulema-e-Islam; 1968 – 1980	Succeeded by Maulana Fazal-ur-Rehman
