= Mohammad Usman (Khyber Pakhtunkhwa politician) =

Pakistani politician

- محمد عثمان

Member of the Provincial Assembly of Khyber Pakhtunkhwa
- Incumbent
- Assumed office 29 February 2024
- Constituency: PK-108 Tank

Personal details
- Born: Tank District, Khyber Pakhtunkhwa, Pakistan
- Political party: PTI (2024-present)
- Parent: Ghulam Qadir Khan Bhittani (father)

Mohammad Usman is a Pakistani politician from Tank District who has been a member of the Provincial Assembly of Khyber Pakhtunkhwa since February 2024.

== Career ==
He contested the 2024 general elections as a Pakistan Tehreek-e-Insaf/Independent candidate from PK-108 Tank. He secured 42,611 votes. The runner-up was Mahmood Ahmad Khan of JUI-F who secured 30,770 votes.
