= Waqar Ahmed Khan =

Politician in Pakistan

- وقار احمد خان

Federal Minister for Privatization
- In office December 2009 – February 2011

Federal Minister for Investment
- In office November 2008 – December 2009

Senate of Pakistan
- In office 1994–2015

Personal details
- Born: 20 July 1955 (age 70) Dera Ismail Khan, Khyber Pakhtunkhwa, Pakistan
- Other political affiliations: Pakistan Muslim League (N) (2023-2025); Independent (2015-2023); Pakistan Peoples Party (2009-2015); Independent (2003-2009); Pakistan Peoples Party (1994-2003)
- Relations: Ammar Ahmed Khan (brother)

Waqar Ahmed Khan (born July 20, 1955, in Dera Ismail Khan) is a Pakistani politician and businessman. He has been a member of the Senate of Pakistan for 21 years. Waqar was elected to the Senate of Pakistan for the first time in 1994 as the youngest ever member of the Upper House of Pakistan for a term of six years and won by an overwhelming majority, securing the largest number of electoral votes from the Provincial Assembly of the North-West Frontier Province. He served as a member of the Senate till 2015, holding positions of Federal Minister for Investment (November 2008 – December 2009) and Federal Minister for Privatization (December 2009 – February 2011). ۔ He is the Chairman of WAKGROUP - one of the business conglomerates in Pakistan whose business portfolio ranges from real estate and construction, energy and steel and fashion to consumer electronics.

== Political Background ==
Many members of Waqar Ahmed Khan's family are politicians and enjoy a historic parliamentary representation in the Upper House. Waqar Ahmed Khan is son of Senator Gulzar Ahmed Khan, an eminent political personality of Pakistan. The Senior Senator Gulzar Ahmed Khan held key Federal Ministries in the Government of Pakistan and remained special assistant for provincial coordination to the Prime Minister of Pakistan. Among other family members are his uncle Mukhtar Ahmed Khan elected to the Upper House and his mother Mrs. Razia Sultana who served as a member of the Lower House (National Assembly) of Pakistan. His uncle was also elected as District Nazim from Dera Ismail Khan District. His brother, Ammar Ahmed Khan served as a Senator as well.

He ran for the National Assembly of Pakistan from NA-24 Dera Ismail Khan as a candidate of the Pakistan People's Party (PPP) in the 2013 Pakistani general election, but was unsuccessful. He received 67,769 votes and was defeated by Fazal-ur-Rehman, a candidate and the leader of the Jamiat Ulema-e-Islam (F) (JUI(F)).

He ran for the National Assembly from NA-38 Dera Ismail Khan-I as an independent candidate, in the 2018 Pakistani general election but was unsuccessful. He received 18,788 votes and was defeated by Ali Amin Gandapur, a candidate of the Pakistan Tehreek-e-Insaf (PTI).

On 22 November 2023, he, along with his family, joined the Pakistan Muslim League (N) (PML(N)).

== Career ==
Gulzar Ahmed Khan (father) and Waqar Ahmed Khan (son) became members of the Senate simultaneously. Waqar Ahmed Khan was elected to the Senate of Pakistan for the first time in 1994 as the youngest ever member of the Upper House of Pakistan for a six years term and won by an overwhelming majority, securing the largest number of electoral votes from the provincial assembly of KPK. He was serving his country as a member of Upper House till 2015 holding positions of Federal Minister for Investment (Nov. 2008 – Dec. 2009) and Federal Minister for Privatization (Dec. 2009 – Feb. 2011).

Waqar Ahmed Khan was active in House Business Affairs and was Chairman of Senate Standing Committee on Labour, Manpower & Overseas Pakistanis and Senate Standing Committee on Textiles. During his parliamentary career, he has also held numerous positions in the House Committees, including Senate Standing Committee on Cabinet, Senate Standing Committee on Establishment & Management Services, Standing Committee on Planning & Development, Standing Committee on Foreign Affairs & Defence, Standing Committee of the House on Water & Power and Standing Committee of the Defense & Communication. Waqar Ahmed Khan has interacted with multi-national companies as well as Development Financial Institutions (DFIs). He also has experience in international and national political and economic strategic affairs.

For his efforts in signing Trade Agreement with G-11 Countries he was awarded a Leadership Honor.

In 2013 Waqar Ahmed Khan members of his family have been embroiled in a lasting legal battle with Deutsche Bank over the property in the north London street. As result the house was repossessed.

In 2014 Senator Waqar Ahmed Khan was accused of giving Rs 500 million to the trust bank of a personal friend in the name of investment when he was the head of the Privatization Commission which was followed by the bank's bankruptcy.
