= Noor Muhammad =

Pakistani Islamic scholar

Sheikh al-Hadīṯh Maulana Noor Muhammad
- مولانا نور محمد شہید

Member of the National Assembly of Pakistan
- In office 1997–1999
- Constituency: NA- 31 Tribal Area-V

Personal life
- Born: 1936 Bizenkhel, Bannu District
- Died: 23 August 2010 (aged 73–74) Wana, South Waziristan
- Cause of death: Assassination
- Political party: Jamiat Ulema-e-Islam (F) and Aalmi Majlis Tahaffuz Khatm-e-Nubuwwat
- Education: Jamia Qasim Ul Uloom
- Occupation: Islamic scholar writer politician

Religious life
- Religion: Islam
- Denomination: Sunni
- Jurisprudence: Hanafi
- Movement: Deobandi

Muslim leader
- Teacher: Mufti Mahmud

Noor Muhammad (1936 – 23 August 2010) (Urdu: مولانا نور محمد شہید) was a Pakistani Islamic scholar and politician, who served as a member of the 11th National Assembly of Pakistan from 1997 to 1999.

== Early life and education ==
Noor Muhammad was born in 1936 in Bizenkhel, Bannu District, to Maulvi Nazar Muhammad Ibn Maulvi Ahmad Noor in a well-known intellectual and spiritual family. He belongs to the Ahmadzai tribe of Wazir.

He received his early education from his late father at home and in 1951 he entered Jamia Qasim Ul Uloom, Multan and studied there for five years under the supervision of Mufti Mahmood.

== Career ==
In 1956, he assumed teaching and oratory duties in Wana, Waziristan, in support of his late father. In 1961, he started the construction of the Jama Masjid Wana, South Waziristan. The construction of the mosque was completed in ten years and at the same time, he laid the foundation of Jamia Darul Uloom Waziristan.

Besides studying in Jamia Qasim Ul Uloom, he ran a two-month continuous political campaign for Mufti Mahmood in Dera Ismail Khan.

In 1997 he was elected to the National Assembly as an independent and later joined the Jamiat Ulema-e-Islam (F) (JUI-F).

== Assassination ==
On 23 August 2010, Maulana Noor Mohammad was assassinated in Jamia Masjid Wana, Waziristan afternoon prayers in the month of Ramadan by a teenage suicide bomber along with more than thirty companions.

He was laid to rest in his ancestral graveyard in Wana and more than 10,000 people attended his funeral prayers. Then President of Pakistan Asif Ali Zardari, Prime Minister of Pakistan Syed Yusuf Raza Gilani, Defence Minister of Pakistan Chaudhry Ahmed Mukhtar including Leader of the Opposition Chaudhry Nisar Ali Khan, Federal Interior Minister Rehman Malik, Nawaz Sharif, Altaf Hussain, Imran Khan and other national leaders strongly condemned the attack and expressed deep shock and grief over the tragic incident.

== Literary works ==
- Uloom ul Anbiya aor Taskheer e Kainat (علوم الانیباء اور تسخیر کائنات)
- Edah ulmaqal fi Ruet-e-Hilal (ایضاح المقال فی رو یت الھلال)
- Jihad-e-Afghanistan (جہاد افغانستان)
- Paish amdah nai masail ki Fiqhi tehqeeq (پیش آمدہ نئے مسائل کی فقہی تحقیق)
- Islami inqilab aor Jihad-e-Islam (اسلامی انقلاب اور جہاد اسلام)

== See also ==
- List of Deobandis
