= Roedad Khan =

Pakistani civil servant (1923–2024)

- رؤداد خان
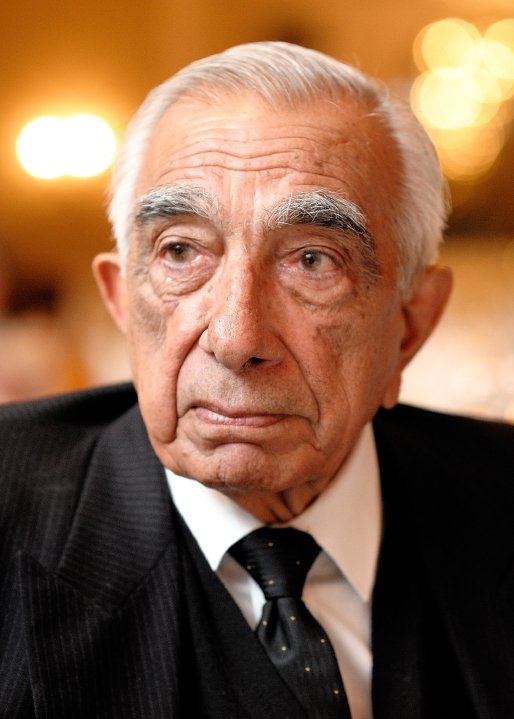
- Khan in 2010

Minister of Accountability
- In office 6 August 1990 – 18 April 1993
- President: Ghulam Ishaq Khan
- Prime Minister: Nawaz Sharif

Secretary General Ministry of Interior
- In office 17 August 1988 – 6 August 1990
- President: Muhammad Zia-ul-Haq
- Prime Minister: Muhammad Junejo

Interior Secretary of Pakistan
- In office 16 September 1978 – 17 August 1988
- President: Muhammad Zia-ul-Haq

Secretary of the Ministry of Tourism
- In office 3 August 1973 – 16 September 1978
- President: Fazal Ilahi Chaudhry
- Prime Minister: Zulfikar Ali Bhutto

Secretary of the Ministry of Tourism
- In office 25 March 1969 – 20 December 1971
- President: Yahya Khan

Pakistan Secretary of Industries and Production
- In office 27 October 1958 – 25 March 1969
- President: Muhammad Ayub Khan

Personal details
- Born: 28 September 1923 Mardan, North-West Frontier Province, British India
- Died: 21 April 2024 (aged 100) Islamabad, Pakistan
- Resting place: H-11 Graveyard, Islamabad, Pakistan
- Education: Forman Christian College (BA); Aligarh Muslim University (MA)
- Occupation: Civil servant

Roedad Khan (28 September 1923 – 21 April 2024) was a Pakistani politician and civil servant. He was a leading figure in Pakistan from the start to the end of the Cold War. During his long career, Khan was one of the most senior civil servants of Pakistan.

Khan joined the Civil Services of Pakistan in 1949 and has held several appointments, including those of Chief Secretary Sindh, Chief Secretary Khyber Pakhtunkhwa, Managing Director PTV, Information Secretary of Pakistan, Secretary Ministry of Labour, Secretary Ministry of Tourism, Interior Secretary of Pakistan, Secretary General Ministry of Interior, Federal Minister of Accountability and Adviser to the PM of Pakistan and the President of Pakistan.

== Personal life ==
Khan was born in a small village of Mardan, North-West Frontier Province, British India, to an ethnic Pashtun family of the Yusufzai tribe.

=== Education ===
In 1939, he graduated from local high school and went on to attend Forman Christian College and gained a BA in English Literature in 1942. The atmosphere at the College was liberal, tolerant and progressive.

Respecting his father's wishes, Khan attended the Aligarh Muslim University and gained an MA in English history in 1946.

Upon his return to Mardan, Khan taught history at Islamia College, Peshawar and opted for Pakistani citizenship in 1947.

=== Later life and death ===
Khan turned 100 on 28 September 2023, and died on 21 April 2024.

== Civil service career ==
In 1949, Khan joined the elite Pakistan Administrative Service, formerly known as DMG, of the Central Superior Services. He started his career in 1951 as the Secretary of Chief Minister of Sindh Provincial Government.

His career was at peak when he served with Chief Martial Law Administrator of Pakistan, General Zia-ul-Haq, responsible for the country's internal security while intelligence efforts were built up to sabotage Soviet military intervention in Afghanistan.

A part of General's Zia policy to enhance the secret establishment, Khan served as its elite member. After the fall of communism, Khan officially retired from Pakistan's politics and civil services and went on to become a political analyst.

Before being appointed the Secretary General, he held the position of Interior Secretary of Pakistan.

Khan went on to become the Secretary General of Pakistan, the highest rank in Pakistani bureaucracy, which could only be achieved after retirement by those who had served at BPS-22 grade, a position no longer in place.

Khan had held major public offices during the regime of President General Zia-ul-Haq and President Ghulam Ishaq Khan. He is also author of three books.

== Length of career ==
During his long career, Khan served with five Presidents of Pakistan namely, Muhammad Ayub Khan, Yahya Khan, Fazal Ilahi Chaudhry, Muhammad Zia-ul-Haq and Ghulam Ishaq Khan.

Khan served with three Prime Ministers of Pakistan.

== Bibliography ==
- Khan, Roedad. Pakistan, a Dream Gone Sour. Karachi: Oxford University Press, 2011.
