= NA-25 (Dera Ismail Khan-cum-Tank) =

Former constituency of the National Assembly of Pakistan

- Former constituency for the National Assembly of Pakistan
- Region: Dera Ismail Khan District; Tank District

Former constituency
- Created: 1977 (as NA-25 (Dera Ismail Khan)
- Abolished: 2018
- Created from: NA-25 (Dera Ismail Khan)
- Replaced by: NA-37 (Tank); NA-39 (Dera Ismail Khan-II)

NA-25 (Dera Ismail Khan-cum-Tank) (Urdu: این اے-۳۴، لور دیر) was a constituency for the National Assembly of Pakistan. It was split into NA-37 (Tank) and NA-39 (Dera Ismail Khan-II) in 2018. The constituency was established as NA-25 (Dera Ismail Khan) in 1977 when Tank was part of Dera Ismail Khan District as one of its tehsils. In 1992, with Tank becoming a district itself, the constituency name was changed to NA-25 (Dera Ismail Khan-cum-Tank).

== Members of Parliament ==
=== 1977–2002: NA-25 (D.I.Khan) ===
Election	Member	Party
1977	Gohar Rehman	PNA
1985	Maulanan M. Inayat-ur-Rehman	Independent
1988	Sahibzada Fateh-ullah	IJI
1990	Najm-ud-Din	IJI

=== 1993–2002: NA-25 (D.I.Khan-cum-Tank) ===
Election	Member	Party
1993	Sahibzada Fatehullah	PIF
1997	Sardar Umar Farooq Khan Miankhel	PML-N

=== 2002–2018: NA-25 (D.I.Khan-cum-Tank) ===
Election	Member	Party
2002	Maulana Fazal-ur-Rehman	MMA
2008	Atta ur Rehman	MMA
2013	Molana Fazal Rehman	JUI (F)
2013 By-election	Engineer Dawar Khan Kundi	PTI

== Elections since 2002 ==
=== 2002 general election ===
2002 General Election: NA-25 (D.I. Khan-cum-Tank)
Party	Candidate	Votes	%	±%
MMA	Fazal-ur-Rehman	59,102	50.23	
PPPP	Dawar Khan Kundi	31,976	27.18	
PML-Q	Al-haj Sardar Umar Farooq Khan Miankhel	18,882	16.05	
Independent	Al-haj Sanaullah Khan Miankhel	3,529	3.00	
Independent	Maulana Atta-ur-Rehman	1,501	1.28	
National Alliance	Farooq Khan	1,415	1.20	
Independent	Abdul Waheed	1,246	1.06	
Majority		27,126	23.05	
Turnout		117,651	44.69	
MMA gain from PML (N)				

A total of 3,622 votes were rejected.

=== 2008 general election ===
2008 General Election: NA-25 (D.I. Khan-cum-Tank)
Party	Candidate	Votes	%	±%
MMA	Atta-ur-Rehman	44,673	33.63	−16.60
PML	Habibullah Khan Kundi	42,831	32.24	
PPPP	Dawar Khan Kundi	39,450	29.70	+13.65
Independent	Abdur Rahim Khan Kundi	1,607	1.21	
Independent	Umar Amin Khan	1,289	0.97	
Independent	Al-Haj Sardar Umar Farooq Miankhel	1,069	0.80	
Independent	Nawabzada Mohammad Saifullah Khan	556	0.42	
PML-N	Huzbullah Gandapur	497	0.38	
Independent	Fahimullah Gandapur	400	0.30	
Independent	Irfanullah Khan Kundi	324	0.25	
Independent	Tariq Rahim Kundi	134	0.10	
Majority		1,842	1.39	
Turnout		132,830	43.00	−1.69
MMA hold		Swing		

A total of 4,613 votes were rejected.

=== 2013 general election ===
2013 General Election: NA-25 (D.I. Khan-cum-Tank)
Party	Candidate	Votes	%	±%
JUI-F	Fazal-ur-Rehman	77,595	41.38	
PTI	Dawar Khan Kundi	47,543	25.35	
PPPP	Faisal Karim Kundi	46,262	24.67	−5.03
Pakistan Sariaki Party	Faqir Jamshed Ahmed	2,956	1.58	
PML-N	Mohammad Yousaf Shah	2,871	1.53	+1.15
Independent	Zaraf Baig Bitani	2,283	1.22	
Independent	Mustafa Kundi	2,105	1.12	
Independent	Alhaj Sardar Umar Farooq Khan	2,002	1.07	
JUP-N	Molana Muhammad Zubair Rohani Bazi	1,044	0.56	
Independent	Muhammad Naseer Khan	915	0.49	
Independent	Ghulam Habib	582	0.31	
Independent	Muhammad Ajmal	325	0.17	
Independent	Pir Muhammad Farooq	301	0.16	
Independent	Ahmed Karim Kundi	154	0.08	
Independent	Mohammad Younas Khan Gandapur	141	0.08	
Independent	Muhammad Ghalib Kamal Advocate	128	0.07	
Independent	Ahmed Abdullah Zafar	119	0.06	
Independent	Khan Gul	116	0.06	
PPP (SB)	Muhammad Aslam Khan	71	0.04	
Majority		30,052	16.03	
Turnout		187,513	53.26	+10.26
JUI (F) gain from MMA				

A total of 9,165 votes were rejected.

=== 2013 By-election ===
A by-election took place on 22 August 2013.

2013 By-election: NA-25 (D.I. Khan-cum-Tank)
Party	Candidate	Votes	%	±%
PTI	Dawar Khan Kundi	73,754	51.29	+25.94
JUI-F	Asad Mehmood	66,069	45.94	+4.56
Independent	Pir Zada Muhammad Sabir Shah	1,270	0.89	
Pakistan Bacho Party	Ghulam Habib Marwat	1,037	0.72	
PPPP	Faisal Karim Kundi	358	0.25	−24.42
Independent	Umar Daraz	327	0.23	
Independent	Sardar Sher Zaman	251	0.18	
Independent	Anas Mehmood	140	0.10	
Independent	Al-Haj Sardar Umar Farooq Khan	89	0.06	−1.01
Independent	Ghulam Qadir Khan Bhittani	86	0.06	
Independent	Mustafa Kundi	79	0.06	−1.06
Awami Muslim League	Gulana Bibi	78	0.06	
Independent	Ahmad Abdullah Zafar	62	0.05	−0.01
Independent	Jahanzeb Babar	51	0.04	
Independent	Muhammad Yousaf	45	0.03	
Independent	Madoo Jan Gohar Wazir	28	0.02	
Independent	Ahmad Karim Kundi	26	0.02	−0.06
Majority		7,685	5.35	
Turnout		143,801	39.19	−14.07
PTI gain from JUI (F)				
