= Krishna Lal Chadha =

Indian horticultural scientist (1936–2025)

- Born: 15 September 1936; Bhopalwala, Sialkot District, Punjab Province, British India
- Died: 23 March 2025 (aged 88); New Delhi, India
- Occupation: Horticultural scientist
- Years active: 1963–20??
- Awards: Padma Shri Borlaug Award; Om Prakash Bhasin Award; Dr. H. M. Marigowda Award; S. K. Mitra Memorial Award; S. S. Ranade Memorial Life Time Achievement Award; HSI-Shivashakthi Life Time Achievement Award; AIKGA Millennium Achievement Award; Dr. B. P. Pal Memorial Award; NAAS Leadership Award
- Website: Official web site

Krishna Lal Chadha (15 November 1936 – 23 March 2025) was an Indian horticultural scientist, author and a National Professor of the Indian Council of Agricultural Research. He was honoured by the Government of India, in 2012, with the fourth highest Indian civilian award of Padma Shri.

== Life and career ==
Krishna Lal Chadha was born to a Punjabi Khatri family on 15 November 1936 in Bhopalwala, Sialkot, in British India, presently in Pakistan. His schooling was at the Government High School, Jalandhar from 1948 to 1951 after which he joined Panjab University, Chandigarh from where he secured a BSc (Agriculture) in 1955 and an MSc (Horticulture) in 1960. Thereafter, he joined the Indian Agricultural Research Institute, New Delhi for higher research and obtained a PhD in 1964.

Chadha started his career as an Assistant Horticulturist at the Indian Agricultural Research Institute in 1963 and worked only for a year to move to Punjab Agricultural University, Ludhiana as a Fruit Specialist in 1964. After working there for five years, he joined the Indian Institute of Horticultural Research (IIHR), Bengaluru in 1969 as Senior Horticulturist. In 1972, he moved to the Central Mango Research Station, Lucknow as the Project Coordinator (Fruits) and, later, got promoted as the Head of the Centre. The next move was back to IIHR, Bengaluru as the Director of the institute in 1980 for a stint till 1986 when he was called to the government cadre as the Horticultural Commissioner, Government of India and later, as the Executive Director of the National Horticultural Board. In 1987, he was promoted as the Deputy Director General of the Indian Council of Agricultural Research from where he retired in 1996. In 1997, he was selected as the ICAR National Professor, a post he held till 2001 and was an adjunct professor of the Indian Agricultural Research Institute ever afterwards.

Krishna Lal Chadha held the chairs of the Indian Society of Agribusiness Professionals (ISAP), the International Mango Working Group and the Indian Agribusiness Systems (Agriwatch), New Delhi during 2007–08. He was a president of various national-level agricultural societies such as the Indian Society of Agriculture Sciences, the Bougainvillea Society of India, the Orchid Society of India and the Mushroom Society of India. He was also the vice-president of the Indian Society of Vegetable Sciences and the Rose Society of India. He was the chief patron of the Association for Improvement in Production and Utilization of Banana and All India Kitchen Garden Association and served the Board of Trustees of the International Potato Center (CIP), Lima, Peru, seven years as a member and three years as its vice-chairman. He also worked as the secretary of the sub-group on Viticulture for Southeast Asia and the vice-chairman of the Commission on Tropical and Sub-Tropical Horticulture. He was a consultant to several international agencies such as Food and Agriculture Organization for the fruit production in eight countries of Asia, Genetic Resources in Thailand, USAID on mango production to Horticultural Export Improvement Association (HEIA), Cairo, Egypt, Bioversity International (former IPGRI) on genetic resources in citrus, mango and sub-tropical fruits and the World Bank on nursery production of horticulture and Forestry species. He was the incumbent president of the Horticultural Society of India.

Chadha was a Fellow of the International Society for Horticultural Science, a US based forum of the scientific and technical professionals in the field of horticulture and was a member of several workgroups within the organization. He also held fellowships of the National Academy of Agricultural Sciences, the Horticultural Society of India and the Indian Society of Vegetable Science. He was the chairman of such government and professional agencies as National Planning Commission of India working group for Horticulture Development in India, National Committee for oilpalm cultivation, Registration Committee for Pesticides, High Power Committee on Restructuring of Department of Agriculture, High Power Committee for Horticulture in the states of West Bengal, Haryana and Gujarat. He was also a member of the National Steering Committee for Organic Products, Planning Commission Committee for Mid-term Review of the eleventh Five Year Plan and two Task Forces for the Government of Kerala and Government of Rajasthan.

Krishna Lal Chadha lived in New Delhi, where the Horticultural Society of India had its headquarters. He died on 23 March 2025, at the age of 88.

== Legacy ==
Chadha was credited with 30 books on the topics of agriculture and horticulture, which include Advances in Horticulture, a 13-volume publication covering 9410 pages. He also brought out a Handbook of Horticulture. Some of the other notable books are Biotechnology of Horticulture and Plantation Crops, Agriculture and Environment, The Grape : Improvement, Production and Post-Harvest Management and The Apple : Improvement, Production and Post Harvest Management. Many books on horticulture and agriculture have cited Chadha in their works.

== Awards and recognitions ==
Krishna Lal Chadha was conferred the doctoral degree of DSc (Honoris Causa) by the Chandra Shekhar Azad University of Agriculture and Technology in 1995. Two other universities, Orissa University of Agriculture and Technology and Rajendra Prasad Agricultural University followed suit in 2008 and 2009 respectively. He received the Borlaug Award in 1984, the Om Prakash Bhasin Award in 1992, the Dr. H. M. Marigowda Award in 1996, the S. K. Mitra Award in 1998 and the S. S. Ranade Memorial Award in 1999. He was also a recipient of honours such as the All-India Kitchen Garden Association Millennium Achievement Award (2001), NAAS Dr. B. P. Pal Memorial Award (2004), HSI-Shivashakthi Life-Time Achievement Award (2007) and the National Agriculture Leadership Award (2008). In 2012, the Government of India included Chadha in the Republic Day honours list for the award of Padma Shri.

== See also ==
- National Academy of Agricultural Sciences
- Indian Council of Agricultural Research
- Indian Agricultural Research Institute
- International Potato Center
