= Sayed Nafees al-Hussaini =

Pakistani Islamic scholar and calligrapher (1933–2008)

Sayed Nafees al-Hussaini PP SI
- سید نفیس الحسینی

Personal life
- Born: Sayed Anwar Hussain; 11 March 1933 Sialkot, Punjab, India
- Died: 5 February 2008 (aged 74) Lahore, Punjab, Pakistan
- Parent: Syed Muhammad Ashraf Ali (father)
- Known for: Calligraphy
- Other name: Nafees Raqam

Religious life
- Religion: Islam
- Denomination: Sunni
- Movement: Aalmi Majlis Tahaffuz Khatm-e-Nubuwwat
- Profession: calligrapher Islamic scholar Poet

Muslim leader
- Students: Allah Wasaya Abdul Majeed Ludhianvi
- Influenced: Zayd ibn Ali Bande Nawaz Syed Ahmad Shaheed Abdul Qadir Raipuri, Bilal Abdul Hai Hasani Nadwi
- Awards: Pride of Performance; Sitara-i-Imtiaz

3rd president of Iqra Rozatul Atfal Trust
- Preceded by: Muhammad Yusuf Ludhianvi
- Succeeded by: Abdul Majeed Ludhianvi

Sayed Nafees al-Hussaini (11 March 1933 – 5 February 2008) (Urdu: سید نفیس الحسینی) was a calligrapher, Islamic scholar, poet, and spiritual figure. He was also blessed with the honour of contributing calligraphy at one of the doors of the Masjid Al Haram in Makkah.

== Early life and education ==
Sayed Nafees Al-Husseini was born in 1933 in Kahoriala village of Sialkot district. His real name was Sayed Anwar Hussain but he became known as Nafees Al-Husseini Shah in the Islamic world. He received his early education at a high school in Bhopalwala. In 1947, he came to Faisalabad and studied up to FA.

== Career ==
Nafees al-Hussaini started his calligraphy career in 1948. He inherited the art of calligraphy from his father, Sayed Muhammad Ashraf Ali, who was an expert in Naskh and had a reputation for expertise and calligraphy in the Holy Qur'an. In 1952, he set up his office in Lahore. He gained special place and expertise in Naskh and Nastaliq scripts. Apart from this, he also created works of art in Kufic, Thuluth, Ruqʿah script and Ijaza. Nafees Al-Husseini visited many countries and participated in the International Calligraphy Competition in Iran and Egypt as a judge. He also invented a script in Nastaliq called "Nafees Nastaliq".

He also served as Central Deputy Emir of Aalmi Majlis Tahaffuz Khatm-e-Nubuwwat.

== Awards ==
- Pride of Performance (1985)
- Sitara-i-Imtiaz
- First prize in a calligraphy exhibition of the Pakistan National Council of the Arts in 1980.
- First prize in the All Pakistan exhibition of Quranic calligraphy in 1982 organized by the Pakistan Public Relations Society.

== Death ==
He died in Lahore on 5 February 2008. Funeral prayers were offered at Badshahi Masjid Lahore in which more than one lakh people from all over the country participated. And according to his will, he was buried in the graveyard of Khanqah Syed Ahmed Shaheed.

== Writings ==
Syed Nafees al-Hussaini authored several works in the fields of Islamic mysticism, poetry, and devotional arts. His works include both poetic and prose contributions, many of which are preserved and published through private collections and cultural institutions.

- برگِ گل (Barg-e-Gul, "Petal of a Flower") – Published in 2006, this Urdu poetry collection includes devotional and spiritual verses (naat, manqabat, and Sufi reflections). It illustrates his command of classical poetic meters and themes of divine love.
- رسالہ اشغال (Risāla-e-Ashghāl, "Treatise on Spiritual Exercises") – A concise handbook written in 1978, focusing on various spiritual practices (ashghāl) rooted in Sufi traditions. It includes litanies, invocations, and contemplative exercises used in the Qadiriyya and Naqshbandiyya orders.
- کلامِ حضرت سید نفیس الحسینی (Kalām-e-Hazrat Syed Nafees al-Hussaini, "Poetry of Syed Nafees al-Hussaini") – A posthumous collection of his Urdu poetry and couplets, published online in 2014. This volume gathers his unpublished works, including devotional poetry, ghazals, and reflections on Islamic ethics.
- نستعلیق نامہ (Nastaliq Nāmah, "The Book of Nastaliq") – A collection of his calligraphic art compiled alongside instructional notes on the aesthetics and history of the Nastaliq script. Though not a literary work in the traditional sense, this manuscript represents his artistic legacy and was shared with students and disciples.

Several of his unpublished works remain preserved by his family and followers and may appear in future collections. His literary and artistic contributions are also featured in cultural exhibitions and are available through the online platform Nafees Library.

== See more ==
- List of Deobandis
