= NA-37 =

NA-37 may refer to:

- NA-37 (Tank), a constituency for the National Assembly of Pakistan
- NA-16-4R (NA-37), a variant of the North American Aviation NA-16 aircraft
- Sodium-37 (Na-37 or ^{37}Na), an isotope of sodium
