= NA-25 =

NA-25 may refer to:

- NA-25 (Nowshera-I), a constituency of the National Assembly of Pakistan
- NA-25 (Dera Ismail Khan-cum-Tank), a former constituency of the National Assembly of Pakistan
- Sodium-25 (Na-25 or ^{25}Na), an isotope of sodium
