= Bhawpal =

Rajput clan

Bhopal or bhawpal, is a Rajput clan that is from tribes that form the Chibhali community. They are found mainly in a region known as Chibhal, that lies on the southern slopes of the Shivalik hills between the Chenab and Jhelum rivers, in the Jammu and Kashmir.

== History and origin ==
The Bhopal Rajput, like other Chibhali claims descent from the Katoch Rajputs of Kangra, what is now Himachal Pradesh, India.

== Conversion to Islam ==
During the Mughal period, reign of Aurangzeb (1658-1707), the Bhopal Rajput clan converted to Islam in the middle of 16th Century.

Dharam Chand Chib, the Hindu Raja of the Bhimber converted to Islam in the 15th century. As a result of his conversion, many other Rajput clans were converted to Islam.

== Distribution ==
In Pakistani Punjab, they are mainly found in District Sialkot, and Gujranwala. In Sambrial, Pasrur, and Daska tehsils. Villages include, Bhopalwala, Ganjianwali, Marakiwal, Qila Sobha Sing and BaddhoMalhi.

In Pakistani Kashmir, they are found mainly in Kotli District and Bagh District, in villages near the line of control.

In Indian administered Jammu & Kashmir, they are found in Rajauri, Nawshera, Akhnoor and Jammu tehsils.

In Indian Punjab, there are also Sikh Bhopal Rajputs found in the Jalandhar district.

== Royal title ==
In Jammu & Azad Kashmir, they use title of Sardar; but in Punjab, they use Rana, Rajput and Chaudhary title.

== Notable people ==
- Haji Muhammad Shafi Rajput – British Peace Keeping Forces before Partition
- Iftikhar Ajmal Bhopal – Executive Member Pakistan Engineering Council
- Zulfiqar Ahmed Anjum Rajput – General Manager Accounts MPCHS Islamabad
- Salman Anjum Rajput – Chairman BlackFire Group
- Chaudhary Muhammad Siddique – Statistical Officer, Planning Division
- Dr. Muhammad Riaz Raza Rajput – Assistant Professor, Bahria University Islamabad

== See also ==
- Muslim Rajput
- Ethnic groups of Azad Kashmir
