= Ammar Ahmed Khan =

Pakistani politician

- عمار احمد خان

Senator of Pakistan
- In office March 2006 – March 2012
- Constituency: Punjab

Personal details
- Political party: Pakistan Muslim League (Q) (2006-2012)
- Relations: Waqar Ahmed Khan (brother)

Ammar Ahmed Khan is a Pakistani politician who served as a Senator from March 2006 to March 2012. He was a member of the Pakistan Muslim League (Q) (PML(Q)) and represented the province of Punjab in the Senate of Pakistan.
