= Faisal Amin Khan Gandapur =

Pakistani politician

Sardar Faisal Amin Khan Gandapur
- فیصل امین خان گنداپور

Member of the National Assembly of Pakistan
- Incumbent
- Assumed office 26 April 2024
- Constituency: NA-44 Dera Ismail Khan-I

Member of the Provincial Assembly of Khyber Pakhtunkhwa
- In office 22 October 2018 – 18 January 2023
- Constituency: PK-97 (Dera Ismail Khan-III)

Provincial Minister for Local Government, Elections and Rural Development
- In office 29 November 2021 – 18 January 2023
- Governor: Shah Farman; Haji Ghulam Ali
- Chief Minister: Mahmood Khan

Personal details
- Born: 20 December 1975 (age 50) Dera Ismail Khan, Khyber Pakhtunkhwa, Pakistan
- Citizenship: Pakistan; France (renounced)
- Party: PTI (2018-present)
- Relations: Ali Amin Gandapur (brother)

Sardar Faisal Amin Khan Gandapur is a Pakistani politician who has been a member of the National Assembly of Pakistan since April 2024. He was a member of the Provincial Assembly of Khyber Pakhtunkhwa from October 2018 to January 2023.

He also served as the Provincial Minister of for Local Government, Elections, and Rural Development from November 2021 till January 2023.

Additionally, he has also worked in modeling and journalism.

Faisal Amin was a French citizen but on the advice of his brother Ali Amin Gandapur relinquished his citizenship in 2018 when he joined the active politics of Pakistan.

== Early life and education ==
Faisal Amin was born in Dera Ismail Khan, Khyber Pakhtunkhwa on 20 December 1975.

He belongs to a politically active Pashtun family of the Gandapur tribe: His late father Major (retd) Aminullah Gandapur was the former Minister for Revenue, Excise and Taxation, while his brothers Ali Amin Gandapur and Umar Amin Khan Gandapur have served in important administrative postings.

He was educated at the Government College University, Lahore and at the Forman Christian College, Lahore, having earned his Master's degree in English literature.

== Career ==
Before entering politics Faisal Amin was a model, featuring in a music video by Shehzad Roy and having walked the runway at the Paris Fashion Week in France. He has written articles for leading French magazines, including the daily newspaper Le Figaro. He is an horse breeder and an environmentalist.

Faisal Amin was elected to the Provincial Assembly of Khyber Pakhtunkhwa as a candidate of Pakistan Tehreek-e-Insaf (PTI) from the constituency PK-97 in the 2018 Pakistani by-elections held on 14 October 2018. He defeated Farhan Afzal Malik of Pakistan Peoples Party (PPP). Gandapur garnered 18,170 votes while his closest rival, the combined opposition candidate Farhan Dhap Advocate of PPP secured only 7,609 votes.
