= Fida-Ur-Rehman Darkhawasti =

Pakistani Islamic scholar (1939–2020)

Shaykh-ul-Hadeeth Hazrat Maulana Fida-ur-Rehman Darkhwasti

Personal life
- Born: 1939 Khanpur, Rahim Yar Khan District
- Died: 1 January 2020 (aged 80–81) Islamabad
- Resting place: Dinpur Sharif, Khanpur, Rahim Yar Khan District
- Parent: Abdullah Darkhawasti (father)
- Political party: Jamiat Ulema-e-Islam
- Education: Jamia Makhzan-ul-Uloom, Eidgah Khanpur

Religious life
- Religion: Sunni Islam
- Founder of: Jamia Anwar-ul-Quran; Madrasa Sariyat-ul-Jabal
- Profession: Islamic scholar, academic, politician

Fida-ur-Rehman Darkhwasti (1939 – 1 January 2020) was a Pakistani Islamic scholar, academic and politician. He was the founder of Jamia Anwar-ul-Quran Adam Town North Karachi, former Central Emir of Jamiat Ulema-e-Islam and former Emir of Jamiat Ulema-e-Islam Sindh Province, Emir of Pakistan Shariat Council and Patron of Jamia Makhzan-ul-Uloom Khanpur. He was the son of Abdullah Darkhawasti. He died in Islamabad on 1 January 2020.

== Biography ==
Darkhwasti was born in 1939 to Abdullah Darkhawasti in Khanpur, Rahim Yar Khan District in an strict Islamic Scholar Shariya Arain family. From the beginning of his education to Dars-i-Nizami, he studied at Jamia Makhzan-ul-Uloom, Eidgah Khanpur, an institution established by his father. He graduated from the Hadith study in 1957, then remained a lecturer and Nazim-e-Talemat (Administrator of Education) at the same university till 1970, after which he moved to Karachi, where he established an institution called Madrasa Sariyat-ul-Jabal in Qasba Colony, with which He also built a mosque of the same name. About six years later, in 1976 he moved to Madinah and stayed there till 1980 and also taught Qur'an there. After that he founded Jamia Anwar-ul-Quran in Karachi in the year 1981, in which there are degrees ranging from reading and memorization of Quran to Hadith and specialization.

He died on 1 January 2020 in Islamabad where he was staying with his relatives. On the same day, the first funeral prayer was offered in Islamabad which was led by Zahid Ur Rashdi and was attended by scholars, students and a large number of people from Islamabad. On the second day, the second funeral prayer was offered by Maulana Mian Masood Ahmed in Khanpur. In which Darkhosti's disciples and students from all over the country participated. After which his burial took place in the special graveyard of Dinpur Sharif beside his father.

== See more ==
- List of Deobandis
