= Dawar Khan Kundi =

Pakistani politician

- داورخان کندی

Member of the National Assembly of Pakistan
- Incumbent
- Assumed office 29 February 2024
- Constituency: NA-43 Tank-cum-Dera Ismail Khan
- In office 25 September 2013 – 31 May 2018
- Constituency: NA-25 (D.I.Khan-Tank)

Personal details
- Born: Runwal, Tank District, Khyber Pakhtunkhwa, Pakistan
- Party: PTI (2013-2017; 2023-present)
- Other political affiliations: PMLN (2020–2023); PPP (2002-2013)

Dawar Khan Kundi (Urdu: داور خان کندی) is a Pakistani politician who is a member of the National Assembly of Pakistan since February 2024. He was also a member from September 2013 to May 2018.

== Early life and education ==
He was born into a politically active Pashtun family belonging to the Runwal village of Tank District. His father Amanullah Khan Kundi, who died in 2023, was a politician affiliated with Islamic Jamhoori Ittehad and later Pakistan People's Party politician and served as the provincial food minister. Dawar's brother Mustafa Kundi is a former district nazim Tank. He has two other brothers, Dilawar Khan Kundi and Abdullah Khan Kundi.

Dawar has done his Master's in Political Science from Gomal University, Dera Ismail Khan, his M.Phil in International Relations from the National Defence University, Islamabad and his Ph.D from the Area Study Centre for Africa, North and South America, Quaid-i-Azam University, Islamabad.

== Political career ==
Kundi ran for the National Assembly from NA-25 (D.I.Khan-cum-Tank) as a candidate of the Pakistan Peoples Party (PPP) in the 2002 Pakistani general election, but was unsuccessful. He received 31,976 votes and lost the seat to Maulana Fazal-ur-Rehman, a candidate and the leader of Muttahida Majlis-e-Amal (MMA).

He ran for the same seat as a PPP candidate in the 2008 Pakistani general election, but was unsuccessful once again, receiving 39,450 votes and losing the seat to Atta-ur-Rehman, a candidate of MMA.

Kundi ran for the same seat once more, this time as a candidate of Pakistan Tehreek-e-Insaf (PTI) in the 2013 Pakistani general election but was unsuccessful. He received 47,543 votes and lost the seat to Maulana Fazal-ur-Rehman, who was contesting as a candidate of Jamiat Ulema-e-Islam (F) (JUI(F)). Fazal-ur-Rehman later vacated the seat in order to retain the seat he had won in his home constituency, NA-24 (D.I.Khan).

Kundi finally won the constituency as a PTI candidate in the ensuing by-election held in September 2013. He received 64,218 votes and defeated Asad Mehmood, a candidate of JUI(F).

In 2017, he was expelled from the PTI for violating the party's code of conduct, as he criticized the party's policies and select individuals such as Ali Amin Gandapur.

He was the only MNA who voted against the constitutional amendment bill for FATA-KP merger in May 2018.

He ran for the National Assembly from NA-37 Tank as an independent candidate in the 2018 Pakistani general election, but was unsuccessful. He received 13,567 votes and was defeated by Asad Mehmood, a candidate of MMA.

On 12 March 2020, he joined the Pakistan Muslim League (N) (PML(N)) and was made the provincial senior vice president of the party.

On 21 November 2023, he left the PML(N) and officially re-joined the PTI.

In the 2024 Pakistani general election, he was re-elected to the National Assembly as a PTI-affiliated independent candidate from NA-43 Tank-cum-Dera Ismail Khan. He received 64,575 votes and defeated Asad Mehmood, a candidate of the JUI(F). He, like all the other winning PTI-affiliated independent candidates, later joined the Sunni Ittehad Council (SIC).
