= Yusuf Ludhianvi =

Pakistani Sunni Muslim scholar

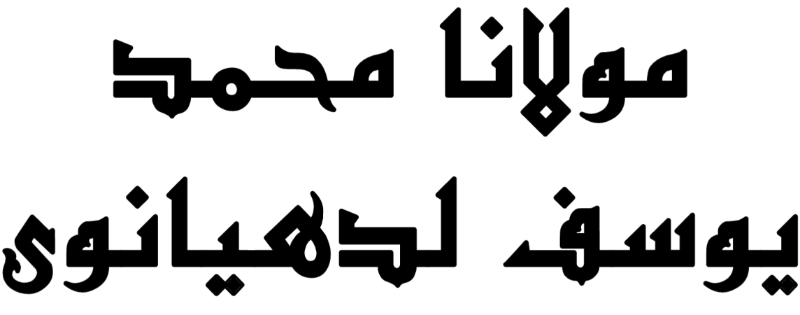

2nd President of Iqra Rozatul Atfal Trust
- Preceded by: Mufti Wali Hasan Tonki
- Succeeded by: Sayed Nafees al-Hussaini

Personal life
- Born: 1932 Ludhiana, Punjab, British India
- Died: 18 May 2000 (aged 67–68) Karachi, Sindh, Pakistan
- Relatives: Muneer Ahmed Akhoon (son in law)

Religious life
- Religion: Islam
- Creed: Sunni
- Movement: Aalmi Majlis Tahaffuz Khatm-e-Nubuwwat

Muhammad Yousuf Ludhianvi (1932–2000) was a Pakistani Sunni Muslim scholar, author, muhaddith, Ahrari leader, and Vice President of Aalmi Majlis Tahaffuz Khatm-e-Nubuwwat.

He was born in Esapur, Ludhiana, Eastern Punjab, India.

He was assassinated on 18 May 2000 in Karachi, Pakistan, at Naseerabad market while going to his office at Numaish Chowrangi before at 9 AM while buying fruits.

== Biography ==
Yusuf Ludhianvi was born in Isapur Village, Ludhiana District, Punjab, India in 1932. His father, Allah Baksh, a practicing Muslim and follower of religious leader Abdul Qadir Raipuri, was the chief (number dar) of his village. He migrated to Pakistan after partition, and settled in a village 335WB which is situated near district Vahari. Yusuf Ludhianvi received his primary Islamic education in Ludhiana, British India. He finished it in Multan, Pakistan under the guidance of Khair Muhammad Jalandhari before becoming a distinguished teacher of Hadith, teaching first in Faisalabad and Sahiwal, Punjab, Pakistan and then at Jamia Uloom-ul-Islamia in Karachi, Pakistan.

Yusuf Ludhianvi wrote over 100 books that have been translated into a number of languages. Aap Kay Masail Aur Unka Hul (regarded as an authority on Hanafi Fiqh) and Ikhtilaf-e- Ummat and Sirat-e-Mustaqeem (Factions in the Ummah and the Straight Path) are among his most famous works.

Besides being the editor of Al-Bayyinat, he was the vice-president of Aalmi Majlis Tahaffuz Khatm-e-Nubuwwat (the International Committee for the Protection of the Finality of Prophethood) and one of the founding fathers of the Iqra school. He taught hadith at Jamia Uloom-ul-Islamia in Karachi, one of the largest seminaries in Pakistan.

Due to his religious knowledge and ability, Muhammad Yousuf Banuri, Emir of Jamia Uloom-ul-Islamia, appointed him to edit the Khatm-e-Nubuwwat (a weekly newspaper) and the Al-Bayyinat (a monthly magazine).

Before being murdered, Yusuf Ludhianvi led efforts to end the ongoing violence between Sunni and Shia Muslims. He was a well-known scholar of the Sunni sect of Islam and had thousands of followers all over Pakistan. Hundreds of his supporters came out into the streets of Karachi to protest his murder. The news of his murder even caused a decline in the Pakistan Stock Exchange index at the end of the day.

== Bibliography ==
- Wasaya, Allah (2018). Tazkirah ShaheedeIslam Maulana Muhammad Yusuf Ludhianvi. Multan: Aalmi Majlis Tahaffuz Khatm-e-Nubuwwat. p. 408.
- Hussain, Imran
- Mahnama Bayyinat - Maulana Muhammad Yousuf Ludhianvi ra Number
