= Bizenkhel =

Coordinates: 33°1′20″N 70°41′55″E

Bizenkhal_Qom
- Town and union council
- Interactive map of Bizenkhal_Qom
- Country: Pakistan
- Region: Khyber Pakhtunkhwa
- District: Bannu District
- Time zone: UTC+5 (PST)

Bizenkhel is a town and union council of Bannu District in the Khyber Pakhtunkhwa Province of Pakistan. It is located at 33°1'20N 70°41'55E and has an altitude of 346 metres (1138 feet).

== Notable persons ==
- Maulana Noor Muhammad
