= Nasiruddin Khakwani =

Pakistani Islamic scholor Early life

Hazrat Maulana Pir Hafiz Muhammad Nasiruddin Khan Khakwani
- مولانا حافظ ناصرالدین خان خاکوانی

9th Emir of Aalmi Majlis Tahaffuz Khatm-e-Nubuwwat
- Incumbent
- Assumed office August 2021
- Preceded by: Abdur Razzaq Iskander

Personal life
- Born: 1942 (age 83–84) Multan
- Education: Aitchison College

Religious life
- Religion: Islam
- Denomination: Sunni
- Jurisprudence: Hanafi
- Movement: Deobandi

Peer Hafiz Muhammad Nasiruddin Khan Khakwani (مولانا پیر حافظ محمد ناصرالدین خان خاکوانی نقشبندی; born 15 October 1942) is a Pakistani Islamic scholar and current Emir of the Aalmi Majlis Tahaffuz Khatm-e-Nubuwwat since August 2021.

== Early life ==
Khakwani's maternal grandmother had a dream around 20 years before his birth in which she saw a child and was informed that he was her son. She was instructed to name him "Nasiruddin". After Khakwani was born, Sayyid ‘Ataullah Shah Sahib Bukhari paid a visit to Khakwani's home in Multan and he instructed that the word "Hafiz" be added to Khakwani's name (moreover, it was a well known specialty of the Khakwani family to have the children memorize the Quran Majeed in their childhood).

== Emir of Almi Majlis Tahaffuz Khatm-e-Nubuwwat ==
Khakwani has also served as Deputy Emir. After the death of Abdur Razzaq Iskander he was appointed as Emir of the Aalmi Majlis Tahaffuz Khatm-e-Nubuwwat.

== Religious heritage and impact ==
His mother's name was Hayaat Bib. Firstly, she gave bay’ah to Mawlana Husayn Ali Sahib of Wan Bhachran (rahimahullah). After his death, she gave bay’ah to Mawlana Abdul Ghafoor Abbasi Madani, and after his death she gave bay’ah to Sayyid Muhammad ‘Alauddin Shah Saheb Jilani.

Maulana `Abdul Ghafoor `Abbasi Muhajir Madani was a senior khalifa of Fazl Ali Shah Qureshi. He completed his religious studies in Madrassa Aminiyyah, Delhi under Kifayatullah Dehlawi. Through him, the fuyoodhaat of Silsilah Naqshbandia Mujaddidia spread in the Arab and non-Arab lands. He was the Shaykh of Sayyid Muhammad Ala’uddin Shah Jilani.

Nasiruddin Khawani is described by his followers as a spiritual successor (khalifa) of Alauddin Shah Jilani, associated with the Naqshbandi Sufi order. Alauddin Shah Jilani is reported to be buried at Khanqah Darus-Salam in Sheikhupura. Khawani is said to continue this tradition through activities focused on spiritual guidance and instruction.
