= Jamia Qasim Ul Uloom =

Religious university in Pakistan

- جامعہ قاسم العلوم
- Type: Madressa
- Established: 1946; 80 years ago
- Founder: Mufti Mahmood
- Affiliations: Jamiat Ulema-e-Islam (F)
- Religious affiliation: Deobandi Islam
- Academic affiliations: Wifaq ul Madaris Al-Arabia, Pakistan
- Chancellor: Asad Mehmood
- Location: Multan, Pakistan

Jamia Qasim Ul Uloom Multan (Urdu: جامعہ قاسم العلوم, romanized: Jamiyah Qasim Uloom) is a Deobandi religious educational centre in Multan, Pakistan. The seminary was established in 1946 by Mufti Mahmood.

In October 1946, Hussain Ahmad Madani visited Multan for formal inauguration and special prayer.

Asad Mehmood is the current chancellor of Jamia.

== Notable alumni ==
- Abdul Majeed Ludhianvi
- Maulana Abdullah Ghazi
- Allah Wasaya
- Ahmed Ludhianvi
- Muhammad Musa Ruhani Bazi
- Noor Muhammad
