= Atta-ur-Rehman (politician) =

Pakistani politician and Islamic scholar

Atta-Ur-Rehman
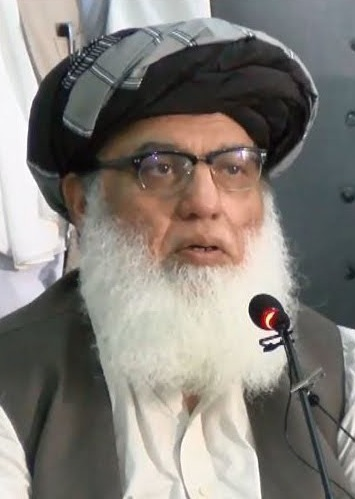
- Atta-ur-Rehman in c. 2016

Member of the Senate of Pakistan
- Incumbent
- Assumed office March 2015

Minister of Tourism
- In office 2008–2010

Vice President JUI (F)
- Incumbent
- Assumed office 2008

Member of National Assembly of Pakistan
- In office 2002–2007
- In office 2008–2013
- Constituency: NA-25

Personal details
- Born: 25 July 1962 (age 64) Dera Ismail Khan, Khyber Pakhtunkhwa, Pakistan
- Party: JUI (F) (2008-present)
- Relations: Fazal-ur-Rehman (brother); Lutf-ur-Rehman (brother); Asad Mehmood (nephew)
- Parent: Mufti Mehmood
- Education: Gomal University
- Profession: Politician; Scholar; Author

Atta-Ur-Rehman (Urdu: عطا الرحمن, born 25 July 1965) is a Pakistani Islamic scholar and politician, who serves as the vice-president of Jamiat Ulema-e Islam (F) and is member of Senate of Pakistan.

He had previously served as federal Minister of Tourism from 2008 to 2010 and was a member of the National Assembly from 2002 to 2007 and again from 2008 to 2013.

He is the son of Mufti Mehmood, former Chief Minister of Khyber Pakhtunkhwa, and the younger brother of Maulana Fazl-ur-Rehman.

== Early life and education ==
Following his early education in a local madrasa, he completed his Master's in Islamic Studies from the Gomal University, Dera Ismail Khan.

== Political career ==
=== Member of National Assembly ===
He was elected two times consecutively as the member of national assembly of Pakistan from NA-25, District Tank. In his first election he led the main contender Mr Dawar Khan Kundi by about 72,000 votes. In his second election of 2008, he defeated the former provincial minister Habib Ullah Khan Kundi aka Babu Khan, but there was a controversy in the result and Babu Khan claimed that the election was unfair and he petitioned a case in the Supreme Court of Pakistan against Maulana Atta-ur-Rehman but the Supreme Court cleared the result and Maulana Atta-ur-Rehman was declared as the member of National Assembly of Pakistan.

=== Minister of Tourism ===
In 2008, JUI, under a unanimous decision passed by the central executive committee, joined the PPP government as a coalition partner and he was given the portfolio of Minister of Tourism. His first measure was to ban alcohol in hotels and restaurants for both local and foreign tourists. He would keep the position till 2010.

== See more ==
- List of Deobandis
