= Kokal =

- Union council
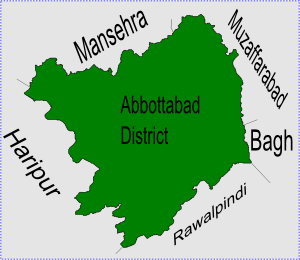
- Kokal is located in Abbottabad District
- Interactive map of Kokal
- Coordinates: 34°06′0″N 73°7′0″E
- Country: Pakistan
- Province: Khyber-Pakhtunkhwa
- District: Abbottabad

Kokal is one of the 57 Union councils of Abbottabad District in Khyber-Pakhtunkhwa province of Pakistan. It is located in the west of the district, near the border with Haripur District.
