= Abdullah Darkhawasti =

Pakistani Sunni Islamic and politician

Abdullah Darkhwasti

Ameer of Jamiat Ulema-e-Islam
- In office 1962–1968
- Preceded by: Ahmed Ali Lahori
- Succeeded by: Mufti Mahmud

Personal life
- Born: 1887 Basti Darkhwast
- Died: 28 August 1994 (aged 106–107)
- Home town: Basti Darkhwast
- Children: Fida-Ur-Rehman Darkhawasti; Mati-ur-Rehman Darkhwasti; Fazlur Rehman Darkhawasti; Qari Ataurehman Darkhwasti; Abdul Rehman Darkhwasti; Khalil-ur-Rehman Darkhawasti; Qari Aziz Ur Rehman Darkhawsti
- Political party: Jamiat Ulema-e-Islam

Religious life
- Religion: Islam
- Founder of: Jamia Makhzan-ul-Uloom, Eidgah Khanpur
- School: خانقاہ عالیہ قادریہ راشدیہ دین پور شریف
- Profession: Islamic Scholar & Political Leader

Muslim leader
- Students: Allah Wasaya Tafazzul Haque Habiganji
- Influenced: Qazi Mu'tasim Billah

Abdullah Darkhawasti (1887–1994) was a Pakistani Sunni Deobandi Islamic scholar, who was the Amir of the Jamiat Ulema-e-Islam. and co-founded Markazi Jamiatul Ulama-e-Islam along with Mufti Mahmud, Ahmad Ali Lahori and others in 1956.

== Biography ==
Darkhwasti was born in Muharram 1313 AH in Basti Darkhawst near Khanpur. He studied his primary classes under his father and later became a student of Ghulam Muhammad Deenpuri, a disciple of Hafiz Muhammad Siddique. Anwar Shah Kashmiri gave him the title of Hafiz al-Hadees. Darkhwasti was the founder of millions of Islamic Institutions (Madarsas) and Mosque. Darkhwasti died on 28 August 1994. His last rites were performed on the next day and was buried nearby Ubaidullah Sindhi. at historical graveyard of Deenpur Sharif.

He played a key role in getting the Ahmadiyya Muslim Community declared as non Muslims in Pakistan.

== Writings ==
He authored several spiritual, doctrinal, and devotional works. Many are esoteric and published via Sufi outlets or family archives. Documented works include:

- Solutions through Duas (انگلیش: A Collection of Du‘ās) – English. Publisher: Islamic Book Service; 90 pages; ISBN 817231356X; published ca. 2000s. Offers guidance through specific prayers for daily needs, spiritual benefits, health, wealth, and protection.
- فیوضات درخواستی مع مجربات درخواستی (Fuyūzāt Darkhawasti maʿ Majarrabāt Darkhawasti, "Darkhawasti’s Spiritual Bounties with Tested Formulas") – Urdu; published 2012. A compendium of Sufi practices, spiritual invocations, charms, and exercises (wazāʼif).
- مقدمہ القرآن للدرخواستی (Muqaddama al-Qurʾān li‑Darkhawasti, "Introduction to the Qur’ān by Darkhawasti") – Urdu; c. 2010s; 291 pages. A thematic and terminological introduction to Quranic sciences, exegesis methods, and principles of Quranic terminology.
- سورۃ یس کا خاص ورد (Sūrah YāʼSīn kā Khāṣ Wazīfah, "Special Recitation Practice for Surah YāʾSīn") – Urdu; Offers specific recitation instructions for spiritual benefits
- خطبات درخواستی (Khutbāt Darkhawasti, "Darkhawasti's Sermons") – Multi-volume series in Urdu, compiled speeches on tawḥīd, sīrah, **akhlaq, **fiqh, Sunnah, and various virtues (e.g., prayer, Ramadan, zakāh). Circa 2020s; attributed to Shafiq‑ur‑Rahman & Hammad‑ullah Darkhawasti.

Numerous other manuscripts and unpublished fatwā collections were reportedly circulated by his Khanpur madrasa and the Jamiat Ulema‑e‑Islam. These texts remain with family and institutional archives.

== See more ==
- List of Deobandis
