= Lutfur Rehman (politician) =

Pakistani politician

MPA Lutf ur Rehman

Leader of the Opposition in the Provincial Assembly of Khyber Pakhtunkhwa
- In office 9 May 2014 – 28 May 2018
- Governor: Mehtab Abbasi; Iqbal Zafar Jhagra
- Preceded by: Mehtab Abbasi
- Succeeded by: Akram Khan Durrani

Member of the Provincial Assembly of Khyber Pakhtunkhwa
- In office 13 August 2018 – 18 January 2023
- Constituency: PK-98 (Dera Ismail Khan-IV)
- In office 31 May 2013 – 28 May 2018
- Constituency: PK-66 (Dera Ismail Khan-III)

Personal details
- Born: 1 March 1968 (age 58) Dera Ismail Khan, Khyber Pakhtunkhwa, Pakistan
- Party: JUI (F) (2013-present)
- Children: Shaima Mahmud,Hamd ur Rehman
- Parent: Mufti Mahmud (father)
- Relatives: Fazl-ur-Rehman (brother); Maulana Atta-ur-Rehman (brother); Zia-ur-Rehman (brother, DCO Karachi Central); Maulana Asad Mehmood (nephew)
- Occupation: Politician

Lutf ur Rehman (Urdu: مولانا لطف الرحمان) is a Pakistani politician hailing from Dera Ismail Khan belong to Jamiat Ulema-e Islam (F). He served as a member of the Provincial Assembly of Khyber Pakhtunkhwa from May 2013 to May 2018 and from August 2018 to January 2023. He served as the Leader of the Opposition of the 10th Khyber Pakhtunkhwa Assembly.

== Early life ==
Maulana Lutfur Rehman was born into an influential political family of Dera Ismail Khan on 1 March 1968.

He is the son of Mufti Mahmud the president of Jamiat Ulema-e-Islam after the 1970 general elections and also served as the Chief Minister of Khyber Pakhtunkhwa, formerly known as the North West Frontier Province (NWFP). He is the younger brother of Maulana Fazl-ur-Rehman, the chief of Jamiat Ulema-e Islam (F), and Atta-ur-Rehman.

His house and those of his brothers are located in a compound next to a madrasa in Shore Kot, Dera Ismail Khan.
