= Kundi (Pashtun tribe) =

Pakistani Pashtun tribe

The Kundi (Niazi) (Pashto: کُنډی) is a sub-tribe of the Niazi tribe of Pashtuns, Afghans that mostly inhabit the areas of Tank, Mianwali and Dera Ismail Khan.
