= Ahmad Kundi =

Pakistani politician

- احمد کریم کنڈی

Member of the Provincial Assembly of Khyber Pakhtunkhwa
- Incumbent
- Assumed office 29 February 2024
- Constituency: PK-112 Dera Ismail Khan-II
- In office 13 August 2018 – 18 January 2023
- Constituency: PK-96 (Dera Ismail Khan-II)

Personal details
- Born: 1 April 1978 (age 48)
- Party: PPP (2018-present)
- Relations: Faisal Karim Kundi (brother)

Ahmad Karim Kundi (Pashto: احمد کریم کنډي; Urdu: احمد کریم کنڈی) is a Pakistani politician who had been a member of the Provincial Assembly of Khyber Pakhtunkhwa from August 2018 till January 2023.

== Political career ==
He was elected to the Provincial Assembly of Khyber Pakhtunkhwa as a candidate of the Pakistan Peoples Party (PPP) from PK-96 (Dera Ismail Khan-II) in the 2018 Khyber Pakhtunkhwa provincial election.
