= Musa Bazi =

Pakistani Islamic scholar and writer (1935–1998)

Maulana Muhammad Musa Bazi Rouhani
- Born: 1935; Kathah Khel, Dera Ismail Khan, Khyber Pakhtunkhwa, Pakistan
- Died: 19 October 1998 (aged 63)
- Education: Darul Uloom Haqqania, Jamia Qasim Uloom
- Occupations: Islamic philosopher, author, scholar, imam, commentator of hadith, astronomer, jurist
- Notable work: Fatḥ Allāh bi-khaṣā'iṣ al-ism Allāh
- Children: Sheikh Muhammad Zubair al-Rohani al-Bazi, Muhammad Uzair al-Ruhani al-Bazi, Muhammad Zubair al-Ruhani, Abdul Rahman Rouhani
- Relatives: Syed Sheikh Ahmad al-Rohani (grandfather)

Maulana Muhammad Musa Bazi Rouhani (1935 - 19 October 1998) was an Islamic philosopher, author, scholar, imam, commentator of hadith, astronomer, jurist, and was one of the prominent scholars of Pakistan. Fatḥ Allāh bi-khaṣā'iṣ al-ism Allāh is considered his most prominent work.

== Early life and education ==
Sheikh Muhammad Musa Bazi Rouhani Bin Maulvi Sher Muhammad Al Bazi was born in Kathah Khel, a village in the district of Dera Ismail Khan, Khyber Pakhtunkhwa, Pakistan.

He then went to Multan and got admission in Jamia Qasim Uloom. He stayed there for three years, and then graduated.

== Writings ==
Shaykh al-Bazi al-Ruhani wrote in every art, and his classifications number about three hundred. Some of them are in print, some in manuscript, some in Arabic, some in Urdu and Persian, and some of his books have been translated into English and others. His famous works include:

- Al-Kanz al-aʻẓam fī taʻyīn al-Ism al-ʻAẓam
- Falakyat-e-Jadeedah فلکیات جدیدہ [Modern Astronomy] (in Urdu).
- Rizq-i ḥalāl va g̲h̲aibī maʻāsh-i Auliyāʼ, musammī bih, targ̲h̲ībulmuslimīn
- Fatḥ Allāh bi-khaṣā'iṣ al-ism Allāh
- Fatḥ al-ʻalīm bi-ḥall ishkāl al-tashbīh al-ʻaẓīm fī ḥadīth "Kamā ṣallayta ʻalá Ibrāhīm"
- Bughyat al-kāmil al-sāmī : sharḥ al-Maḥṣūl wa-al-ḥāsil lil-Jāmī ; maʻa al-Ṭarīq al-ʻādil ilá bughyat al-Kāmil
- Muqaddimat sharḥ al-Bayḍāwī al-musammāt As̲mār al-Takmīl limā fī Anwār al-tanzīl
- Al-Hayʼat al-Ṣughraʹ maʻ sharḥhā Madār al-Bushrā

== Death and legacy ==
He died at the age of sixty-three on 27 Jumadi al-Thani 1419 AH, corresponding to 19 October 1998.

Sheikh Al-Bazi left four sons, each of whom is a scholar. The first among them is Sheikh Muhammad Zubair al-Rohani al-Bazi, second is Muhammad Uzair al-Ruhani al-Bazi, third is Muhammad Zubair al-Ruhani, and fourth is Abdul Rahman Rouhani.

Many scholars and students have praised Sheikh Al-Bazi, even the Imam of the Great Mosque of Makkah, Sheikh Muhammad bin Abdullah Al-Sabil, who said: "Scholars and Sheikhs from all over the world come to me, but I have not seen any scholar who is more knowledgeable and more correct than Al-Shaykh".
