= Asad Mehmood =

Pakistani politician

Minister of Communications
- In office 19 April 2022 – 10 August 2023
- President: Arif Alvi
- Prime Minister: Shehbaz Sharif
- Preceded by: Murad Saeed

Member of the National Assembly of Pakistan
- In office 13 August 2018 – 10 August 2023
- Constituency: NA-37 (Tank)

Chairman Standing Committee on Religious Affairs and Inter-faith Harmony
- In office 11 February 2020 – 10 August 2023

Muhtamim of Jamia Qasim-ul-Uloom
- Incumbent
- Assumed office 2016

Personal details
- Born: Asad Mehmood; 1985 (age 40–41) Abdul Khel, Khyber Pakhtunkhwa, Pakistan
- Party: Jamiat Ulema-e-Islam (F)
- Other political affiliations: Muttahida Majlis-e-Amal (2018-2025) (a political alliance that included the Jamiat Ulema-e-Islam (F) party)
- Relations: Mufti Mahmud (grand father); Atta-ur-Rehman (uncle); Lutf ur Rehman (uncle)
- Parent: Fazal-ur-Rehman (father)
- Education: Jamia Qasim Ul Uloom; Jamia Khairul Madaris

Asad Mehmood (Urdu: اسعد محمود; born 1985) is a Pakistani Islamic scholar and politician, who served as the Federal Minister for Communications from April 2022 to August 2023 and was a member of the National Assembly of Pakistan from August 2018 till August 2023.

He also served as the Chairman of the National Assembly Standing Committee on Religious Affairs and Inter-faith Harmony.

He is an alumnus of Khair al-Madaris and also serves as the chancellor of Jamia Qasim Ul Uloom.

== Political career ==
He was elected to the National Assembly of Pakistan as a candidate of Muttahida Majlis-e-Amal (MMA) from Constituency NA-37 (Tank) in the 2018 Pakistani general election. He received 28,504 votes and defeated Habib Ullah Khan Kundi, a candidate of Pakistan Tehreek-e-Insaf. Following his successful election, MMA nominated him for the office of Deputy Speaker of the National Assembly of Pakistan.

On 15 August 2018, he lost the office to Qasim Suri. He also served as the Chairman of Standing Committee of National Assembly of Pakistan on Religious Affairs and Inter-faith Harmony. He took oath as a federal minister for Communications and Postal Services in Shahbaz Sharif Cabinet.

== Personal life ==
Asad was born in 1985; he is the son of Fazal-ur-Rehman, former Leader of and President of Pakistan Democratic Movement, and grandson of Mufti Mahmood, former Chief Minister of NWFP (now Khyber Pakhtunkhwa).

He graduated from Jamia Qasim ul Uloom in Multan in 2010, taught there as a lecturer, and is its Chancellor.
