= Allah Wasaya =

Pakistani islamic scholar

- مولانا الله وسايا

Personal life
- Born: December 1945 (age 80) Garwan, Bahawalpur
- Education: Jamia Abbasia Bahawalpur; Jamia Qasim Ul Uloom

Religious life
- Religion: Islam
- Denomination: Sunni
- Movement: Aalmi Majlis Tahaffuz Khatm-e-Nubuwwat
- Profession: Islamic scholar writer

Muslim leader
- Teacher: Abdullah Darkhawasti; Sayed Nafees al-Hussaini; Abdul majeed ludhianvi

Allah Wasaya (born; 1945 Urdu: مولانا الله وسايا) is a Pakistani Islamic scholar and one of the leaders of Aalmi Majlis Tahaffuz Khatm-e-Nubuwwat.

== Biography ==
Wasaya born in 26 December 1945 to Malik Muhammad Ramzan in Garwan, Bahawalpur. He received his early education at Madrasa Rafiq-ul-Ulema, Basti Faqiran. Then he studied in Jamia Abbasia now Islamia University of Bahawalpur and Jamia Qasim Ul Uloom Multan and "Dora-e-Hadith" from Jamia Makhzan-Al-Ullum Khanpur, Rahim Yar Khan under Abdullah Darkhawasti. In 1968 he connected with Aalmi Majlis Tahaffuz Khatm-e-Nubuwwat. Since 1981 he is serving as a central leader of AMTKN in Head Office Multan.

== Literary work ==
- Tehreek e Khatam e Nubuwwat (1974 – Vol 1)
- Firaaq e Yaraan (2006)
- Tazkirah ShaheedeIslam Maulana Muhammad Yusuf Ludhianvi
- Fitna E Qadiyaniat Ki Niqab Kushaai
- Qadyaniat Defeated in the Parliament

== See more ==
- List of Deobandis
