= NA-43 Tank-cum-Dera Ismail Khan =

Constituency of the National Assembly of Pakistan

- Constituency for the National Assembly of Pakistan
- Region: Tank District and Paniala Tehsil, Kulachi Tehsil and Dera Ismail Khan Tehsil (partly) of Dera Ismail Khan District
- Electorate: 392,214

Current constituency
- Created: 2023
- Party: Pakistan Tehreek-e-Insaf
- Member: Dawar Khan Kundi
- Created from: NA-37 Tank & NA-51 T.A XXII

NA-43 Tank-cum-Dera Ismail Khan (این اے-43، ٹانک-کم-ڈیرہ اسماعیل خان) is a constituency for the National Assembly of Pakistan. The constituency was created in 2023 by merging Tank District with parts of Dera Ismail Khan District. Dawar Khan Kundi is the incumbent parliamentarian from the constituency, following the 2024 Pakistani general election.

== Members of Parliament ==
=== 2018–2023: NA-37 Tank ===
Election	Member	Party
2018	Asad Mehmood	MMA

=== 2024–present: NA-43 Tank-cum-Dera Ismail Khan ===
Election	Member	Party
2024	Dawar Khan Kundi	PTI

== 2018 general election ==
General elections were held on 25 July 2018.

General election 2018: NA-37 Tank
Party	Candidate	Votes	%	±%
MMA	Asad Mehmood	28,504	37.27	
PTI	Habibullah Khan	16,599	21.70	
Independent	Dawar Khan Kundi	13,569	17.74	
Independent	Ghulam Badshah	9,262	12.11	
Others	Others (nine candidates)	8,548	11.18	
Turnout		79,967	44.21	
Total valid votes		76,482	95.64	
Rejected ballots		3,485	4.36	
Majority		11,905	15.57	
Registered electors		180,872		
MMA gain from PTI				

== 2024 general election ==
General elections were held on 8 February 2024. Dawar Khan Kundi won with 64,575 votes.

General election 2024: NA-43 Tank-cum-Dera Ismail Khan
Party	Candidate	Votes	%	±%
PTI	Dawar Khan Kundi (Note: Filed nomination papers as PTI candidate but ECP allowed him to run as an Independent)	64,575	38.70	▲17.00
JUI (F)	Asad Mehmood	64,020	38.36	N/A
TLP	Muhammad Ramzan	19,985	11.98	N/A
Others	Others (nineteen candidates)	18,301	10.97	
Turnout		171,998	43.85	
Total valid votes		166,881	97.02	
Rejected ballots		5,117	2.98	
Majority		555	0.33	▼1.24
Registered electors		392,214		

== See also ==
- NA-42 South Waziristan Upper-cum-South Waziristan Lower
- NA-44 Dera Ismail Khan-I
