= Ministry of Tourism (Pakistan) =

Defunct Ministry of the Government of Pakistan

The Ministry of Tourism was a federal ministry of the Government of Pakistan. It was established to develop the tourism industry in Pakistan. The ministry was abolished after the Eighteenth Amendment to the Constitution of Pakistan was passed in 2010. The main objectives and functions of the ministry were largely transferred to the Pakistan Tourism Development Corporation (PTDC).

== See also ==
- Tourism in Pakistan
