= Mahmood Ahmad Khan =

Pakistani politician

Member of the Khyber Pakhtunkhwa Assembly
- In office 13 August 2018 – 18 January 2023
- Constituency: PK-94 (Tank)
- In office 31 May 2013 – 28 May 2018
- Constituency: PK-69 (Tank)

Personal details
- Party: JUI (F)
- Occupation: Politician

Mahmood Ahmad Khan is a Pakistani politician, belonging to Jamiat Ulema-e Islam (F), who was a member of the Provincial Assembly of Khyber Pakhtunkhwa from May 2013 to May 2018 and from August 2018 to January 2023. He also served as a member of different committees.

== Political career ==
Khan was elected as the member of the Khyber Pakhtunkhwa Assembly on ticket of Jamiat Ulema-e Islam (F) from PK-69 (Tank) in the 2013 Pakistani general election. He was re-elected in the 2018 General Elections on the ticket of Muttahida Majlis-e-Amal (a political alliance consisting of conservative, Islamist, religious, and far-right parties).
