= Abdul Khel =

Coordinates: 32°23′59″N 70°54′49″E

- Union council and town
- Interactive map of Abdul Khel
- Country: Pakistan
- Province: Khyber-Pakhtunkhwa
- District: Lakki Marwat District

Government
  - Chairman: Fazal-ur-Rehman

Population
  - Total: 12,000
- Time zone: UTC+5 (PST)

Abdul Khel is a town and union council in the Lakki Marwat District of Bannu Division in the Khyber Pakhtunkhwa province of Pakistan. It is located at 32°23'59N 70°54'49E and has an altitude of 493 metres (1620 feet).
