= PK-108 Tank =

Pakistani electoral district

- Constituency for the Khyber Pakhtunkhwa Assembly
- Region: Tank District

Current constituency
- Created: 1993
- Number of members: 1
- Created from: PK-69 Tank (2002-2018); PK-94 Tank (2018-2023)

PK-108 Tank (پی کے-108، ٹانک) is a constituency for the Khyber Pakhtunkhwa Assembly of the Khyber Pakhtunkhwa province of Pakistan.

== See also ==
- PK-107 Lakki Marwat-III
- PK-109 Upper South Waziristan
