= Bhopalwala =

Town in Sialkot District

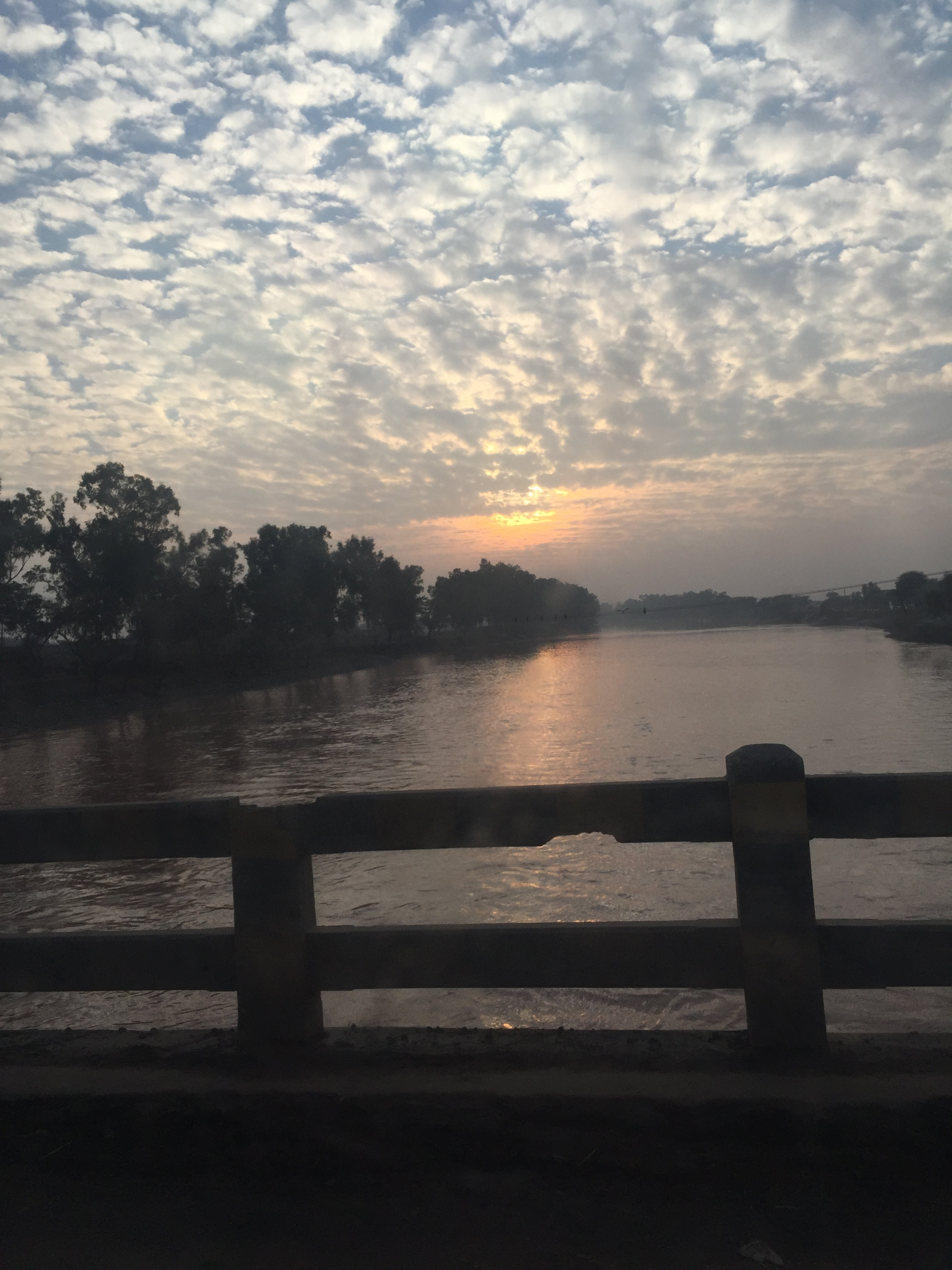

Bhopalwala is a village in Sialkot District, located in Punjab, Pakistan. It is one of the largest villages in the district and is surrounded by agricultural lands.
