= Aalmi Majlis Tahaffuz Khatm-e-Nubuwwat =

International movement for religious preaching and reform of Islam

- عالمی مجلس تحفظ ختمِ نبوت
- Abbreviation: AMTKN
- Formation: 1954
- Founder: Syed Ata Ullah Shah Bukhari
- Founded at: Multan
- Headquarters: Multan
- Secretary General: Maulana Aziz Ur Rehman Jalandhari
- Emir: Maulana Hafiz Nasiruddin khan Khakwani
- Deputy Emir (s): Maulana Syad Salman yousaf Binori; Maulana Khawaja Aziz Ahmad
- Key people: Allah Wasaya
- Publication: Khatm-e-Nubuwwat (Weekly); Laulak (Monthly)
- Website: khatm-e-nubuwwat.com

Aalmi Majlis Tahaffuz Khatm-e-Nubuwwat (Urdu: عالمی مجلس تحفظ ختمِ نبوت) is an international Islamic organization. Founded by Syed Ata Ullah Shah Bukhari in 1954 in Multan when Majlis-e-Ahrar-e-Islam was banned due to Khatm-e-Nubuwwat movement of 1953, Pakistan as a non-political missionary organization. He was elected the first Emir. The incumbent Emir is Nasiruddin Khakwani. In 1974 Tehreek e Khatam e Nabuwat under the guidance of AMTKN as a result, the National Assembly unanimously amended the constitution to declare the Ahmadi religious community a non-Muslim minority.

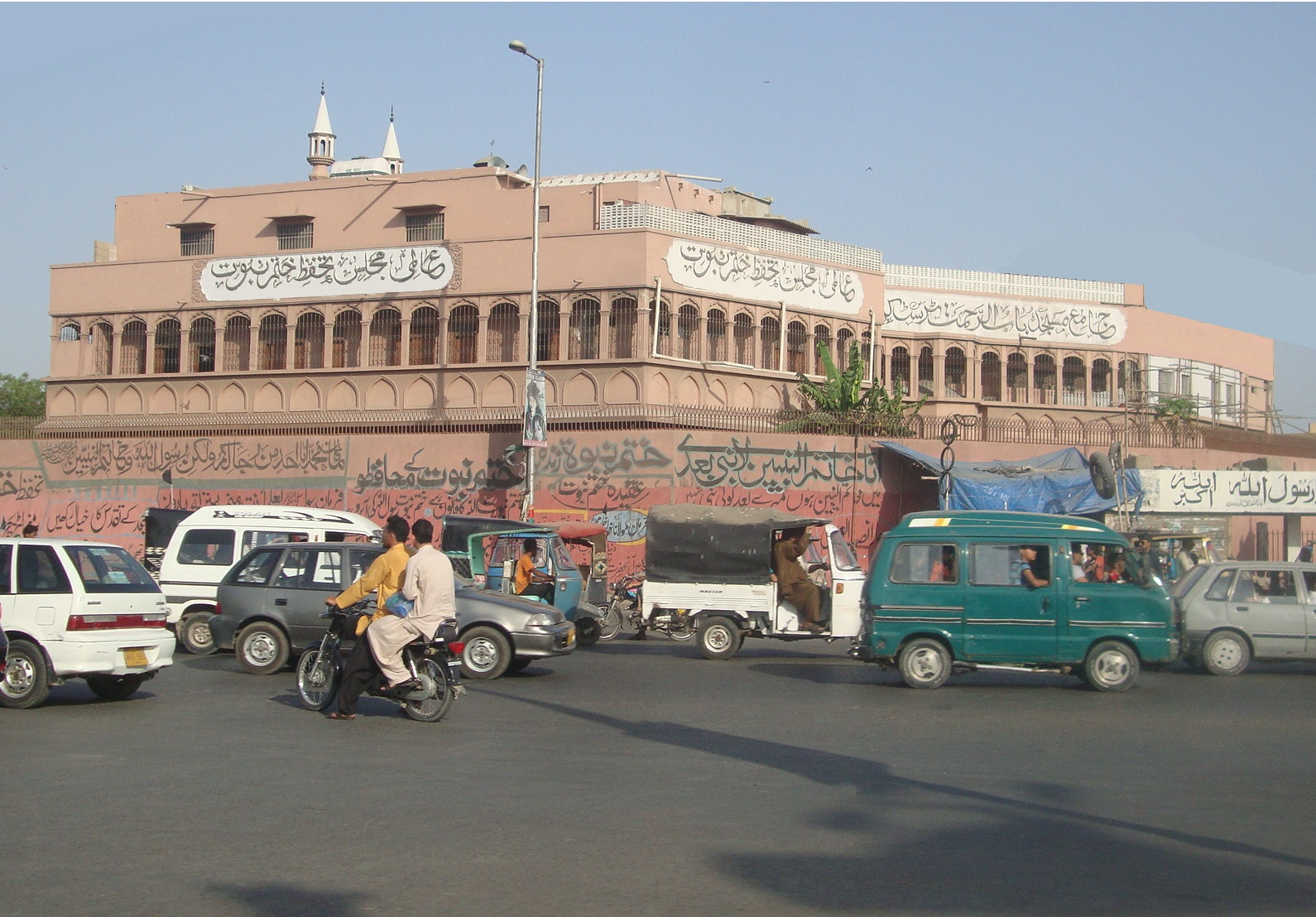
Masjid-e-Aalmi Majlis Tahaffuz-e-Khatm-e-Nabuwat - a Mosque in Karachi named after AMTKN

== Emirs ==
- Syed Ata Ullah Shah Bukhari (1954–1961)
- Qazi Ahsan Ahmed Shuja Abadi
- Muhammad Ali Jalandhari
- Lal Hussain Akhtar
- Maulana Muhammad Hayat (acting Emir)
- Muhammad Yousuf Banuri (1974–1977)
- Khawaja Khan Muhammad (1977–2010)
- Abdul Majeed Ludhianvi (2010–2015)
- Abdur Razzaq Iskander (2015–2021)
- Nasiruddin Khakwani (2021–Present)

== Publications ==
- Khatm-e-Nubuwwat (Weekly Magazine)
- Laulak (Monthly Magazine)
