= Fazal-ur-Rehman (politician, born 1953) =

Pakistani politician

- فضل الرحمان
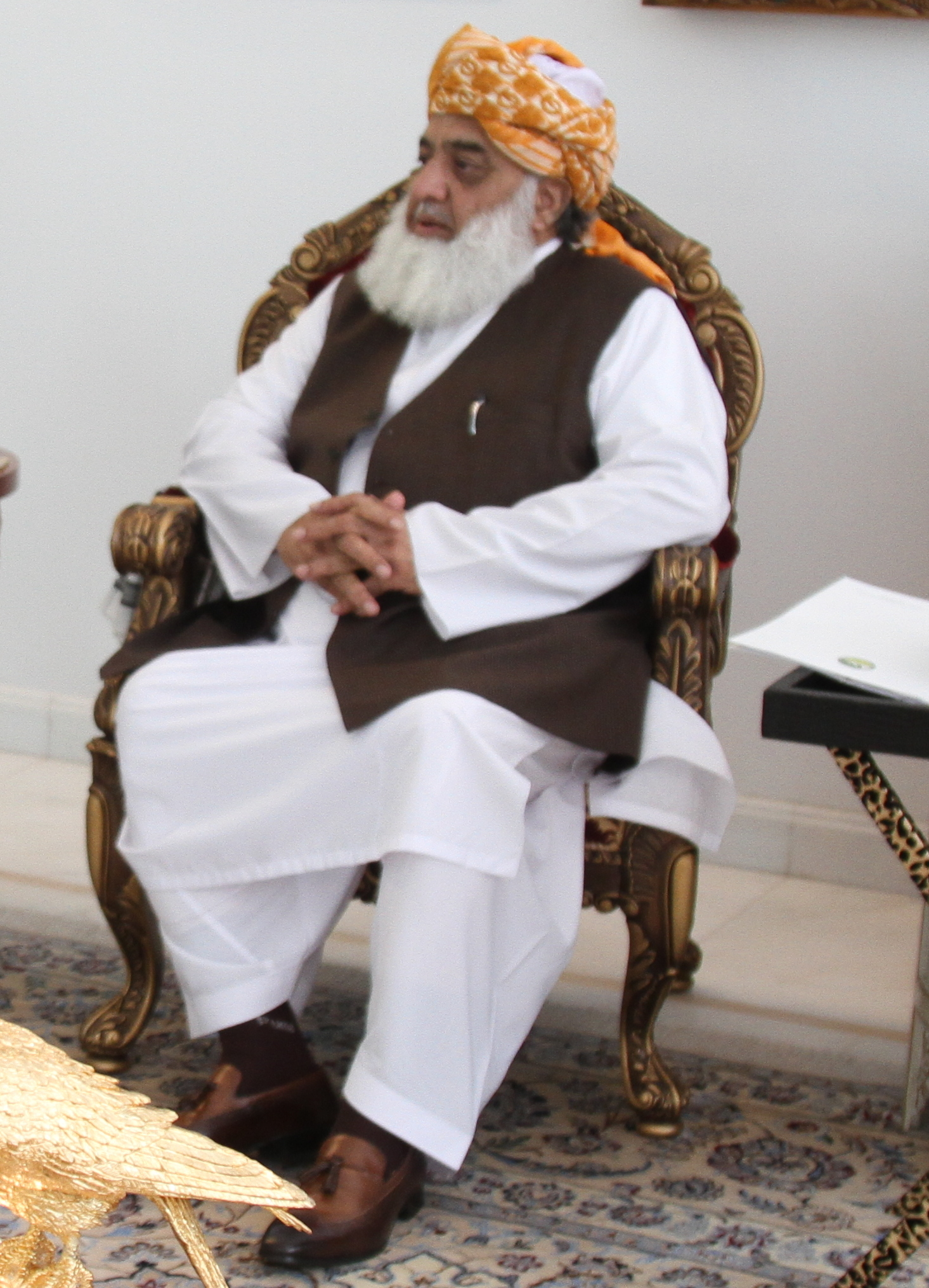
- Fazal-ur-Rehman in c. 2016

Leader of the Opposition
- In office 25 March 2004 – 15 November 2007
- President: Pervez Musharraf
- Prime Minister: Shaukat Aziz
- Preceded by: Benazir Bhutto
- Succeeded by: Chaudhry Pervaiz Elahi

President of Pakistan Democratic Movement
- In office 20 September 2020 – September 2023

Emir of Jamiat Ulema-e-Islam (F)
- Incumbent
- Assumed office 1995
- Vice President: Atta-ur-Rehman
- Preceded by: Abdullah Darkhawasti

General Secretary of Jamiat Ulema-e-Islam (F)
- In office 1980–1995
- Preceded by: Mufti Mahmud
- Succeeded by: Abdul Ghafoor Haideri

President of Muttahida Majlis-e-Amal
- In office 14 December 2017 – 27 July 2018 (as Jamaat-e-Islami part ways from MMA)

Chairman of the Parliamentary Special Committee on Kashmir
- In office August 2013 – 31 May 2018
- In office 16 September 2008 – 24 March 2013
- President: Asif Ali Zardari; Mamnoon Hussain
- Prime Minister: Yousuf Raza Gilani; Raja Pervaiz Ashraf; Nawaz Sharif; Shahid Khaqan Abbasi

Member of the Standing Committee on Foreign Affairs
- In office 2008–2013

Chairman of Standing Committee on Foreign Affairs
- In office 1993–1996

Member of the National Assembly of Pakistan
- Incumbent
- Assumed office 29 February 2024
- Constituency: NA-265 Pishin
- In office 1 June 2013 – 31 May 2018
- Constituency: NA-24 (D.I. Khan)
- In office 17 March 2008 – 31 May 2013
- Constituency: NA-26 (Bannu)
- In office 18 November 2002 – 18 November 2007
- Constituency: NA-24 (D.I. Khan)
- In office 16 October 1993 – 5 November 1996
- Constituency: NA-18 Dera Ismail Khan
- In office 2 December 1988 – 6 August 1990
- Constituency: NA-18 Dera Ismail Khan

Personal details
- Born: 19 June 1953 (age 73) Abdul Khel, NWFP, Pakistan
- Party: Jamiat Ulama-e-Islam
- Other political affiliations: Muttahida Majlis-e-Amal (MMA) (2002–2008)
- Children: Asad Mehmood
- Parent: Mufti Mahmud (father)
- Relatives: Lutfur Rehman (brother); Atta-ur-Rehman (brother)
- Education: Darul Uloom Haqqania; Jamia Qasim Ul Uloom

Fazal-ur-Rehman (Note: Urdu: مولانا فضل الرحمان) (born 19 June 1953) is a Pakistani Islamic scholar and politician, who serves as the president of Jamiat Ulema-e-Islam (F). He is also a member of the National Assembly since February 2024 and had previously served in that position between 1988 and 2018. He was also the Leader of the Opposition from 2004 to 2007. In the 1980s, he was part of the Movement for the Restoration of Democracy, which was formed to end the military regime of General Zia-ul-Haq.

He was previously the president of the Pakistan Democratic Movement (PDM), a coalition of political parties which ousted then prime minister Imran Khan through a no-confidence motion in 2022.

Fazal-ur-Rehman is a strong Taliban supporter, known for his close ties to the Islamic Emirate of Afghanistan. He has called for imposition of Sharia in Pakistan and is regarded by some as an extremist, though he has tried to re-brand himself as moderate. Being a follower of Mahmud Hasan Deobandi who campaigned for liberation against the British Raj but later restricted his members from armed struggle after establishing a political party, Rehman opposed armed struggle to impose sharia laws as it leads to extremism in society. When in power in Khyber Pakhtunkhwa from 2004 to 2007, his party passed the 'Hasba Bill' which was later declared illegal and unconstitutional. Through this bill, he believed that he would be following in his father Mufti Mahmud's footsteps, as he tried to implement 'Nizam-e-Mustafa', which his father struggled for throughout his political life. However, it was declared unconstitutional by Chief Justice of Pakistan Iftikhar Chaudhry.

After defeat in the 2018 Pakistani general election, Rehman was ejected from the National Assembly and failed to win major political support in Khyber Pakhtunkhwa, winning 10 of the 99 seats in his home turf. Alleging election fraud, 11 opposition political parties formed the PDM appointing Rehman as the president of this movement.

== Early life and education ==
Rehman was born on 19 June 1953 (1 September according to another report) to a Pashtun family, in the village of Abdul Khel in Dera Ismail Khan. His father, Mufti Mahmud, was an Islamic scholar of the Deobandi branch and a politician who served as the Chief Minister of Khyber Pakhtunkhwa from 1972 to 1973.

His early education was from a High School in Multan, where he was a student of Mussarat Baig and Syed Iqbal Shah. He attained a Bachelor's degree (B.A) in 1983 from University of Peshawar and completed his Master's degree at Al-Azhar University in Cairo. During his early religious training and education in arabic grammar and Islamic logic he remained the disciple of Mufti Muhammad Essa Gurmani and Molana Abdul Ghaffor Gurmani of Shadan Lund, later studying Sharah-e-Mata-e-Aamil and Hidayat-un-Nahv with Muhammad Ameer of Chudwan in a madrassa in Multan. He was a student of Abdul Haq Akorwi, Hasan Jan, and Syed Sher Ali Shah during his Shahadat-ul Alamia at Darul Uloom Haqqania, and subsequently completed his Dars-i Nizami with distinction in 1979.

== Political career ==
Rehman began his political career as the secretary general of Jamiat Ulema-e-Islam in 1980 at the age of 27. This was after the death of his father Mufti Mehmood who was the leader of the party before his death. He was arrested multiple times during General Zia ul Haq's martial law between 1980 and 1985.

Jamiat Ulema-e-Islam later split into two factions in the mid-1980s with the Jamiat Ulema-e-Islam (F) led by Fazal-ur-Rehman. Fazal-ur-Rehman was elected as the member of the National Assembly of Pakistan in the 1988 Pakistani general elections for the first time on from D.I. Khan seat. He then made connections with Afghan Taliban. Fazal-ur-Rehman ran for the seat of the National Assembly of Pakistan in the 1990 Pakistani general elections for the second time on from D.I. Khan seat but did not win the election. Fazal-ur-Rehman was elected as the member of the National Assembly of Pakistan in the 1993 Pakistani general elections for the second time on Islamic Jamhoori Mahaz ticket from D.I. Khan seat. Fazal-ur-Rehman was appointed as the Chairman of the Standing Committee for Foreign Affairs in National Assembly of Pakistan. Fazal-ur-Rehman ran for the seat of the National Assembly of Pakistan in the 1997 Pakistani general elections for the fourth time but did not win the election.

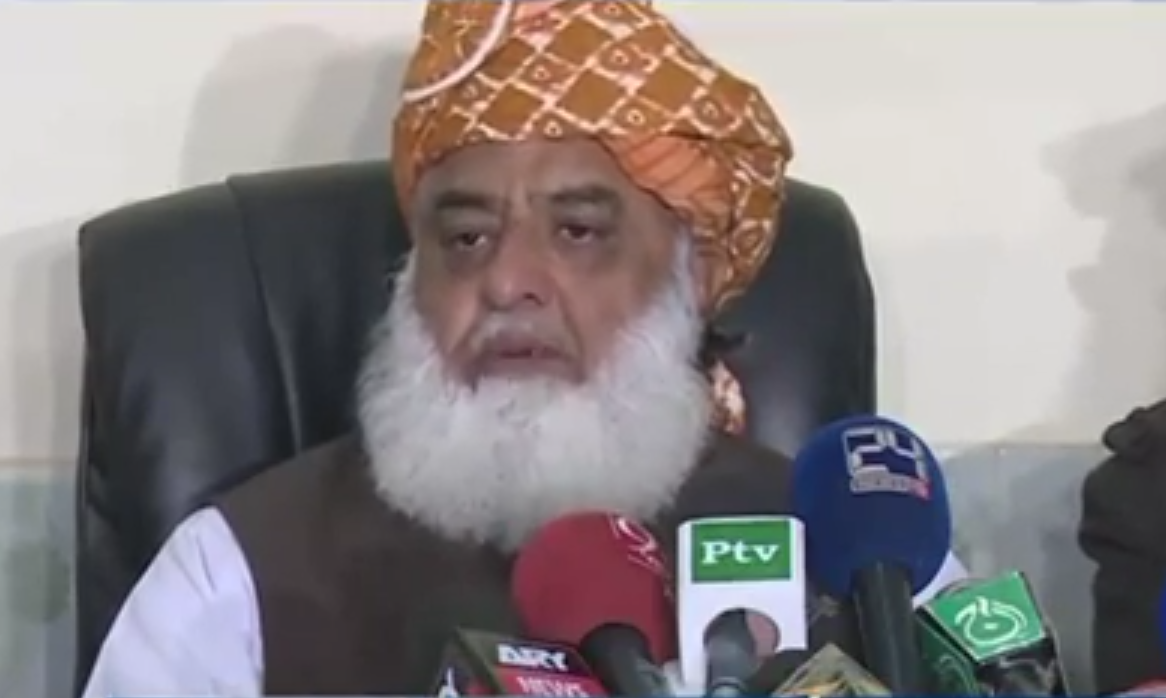
Fazlur Rehman during a Press conference

Fazal-ur-Rehman was elected as the member of the National Assembly of Pakistan in the 2002 Pakistani general elections for the third time on Muttahida Majlis-e-Amal ticket. He won on two seats, NA-24 and NA-25, the later was vacated. Upon winning the election, Rehman became a potential candidate for the post of prime minister of Pakistan but was not appointed. He served as the leader of the opposition from 2004 to 2007.

Fazal-ur-Rehman ran for the seat of the National Assembly of Pakistan in the 2008 Pakistani general elections for the sixth time on Muttahida Majlis-e-Amal ticket from two constituencies, NA-24, D.I. Khan which is his traditional constituency and NA-26, Bannu In September 2008, he was elected chairman of the Kashmir committee of the National Assembly of Pakistan. Rehman was elected as the member of the National Assembly of Pakistan for the fourth time on Muttahida Majlis-e-Amal ticket from Bannu constituency, but he lost the election in D.I. Khan constituency. By 2008, Fazal-ur-Rehman distanced himself from Taliban and called himself a moderate.

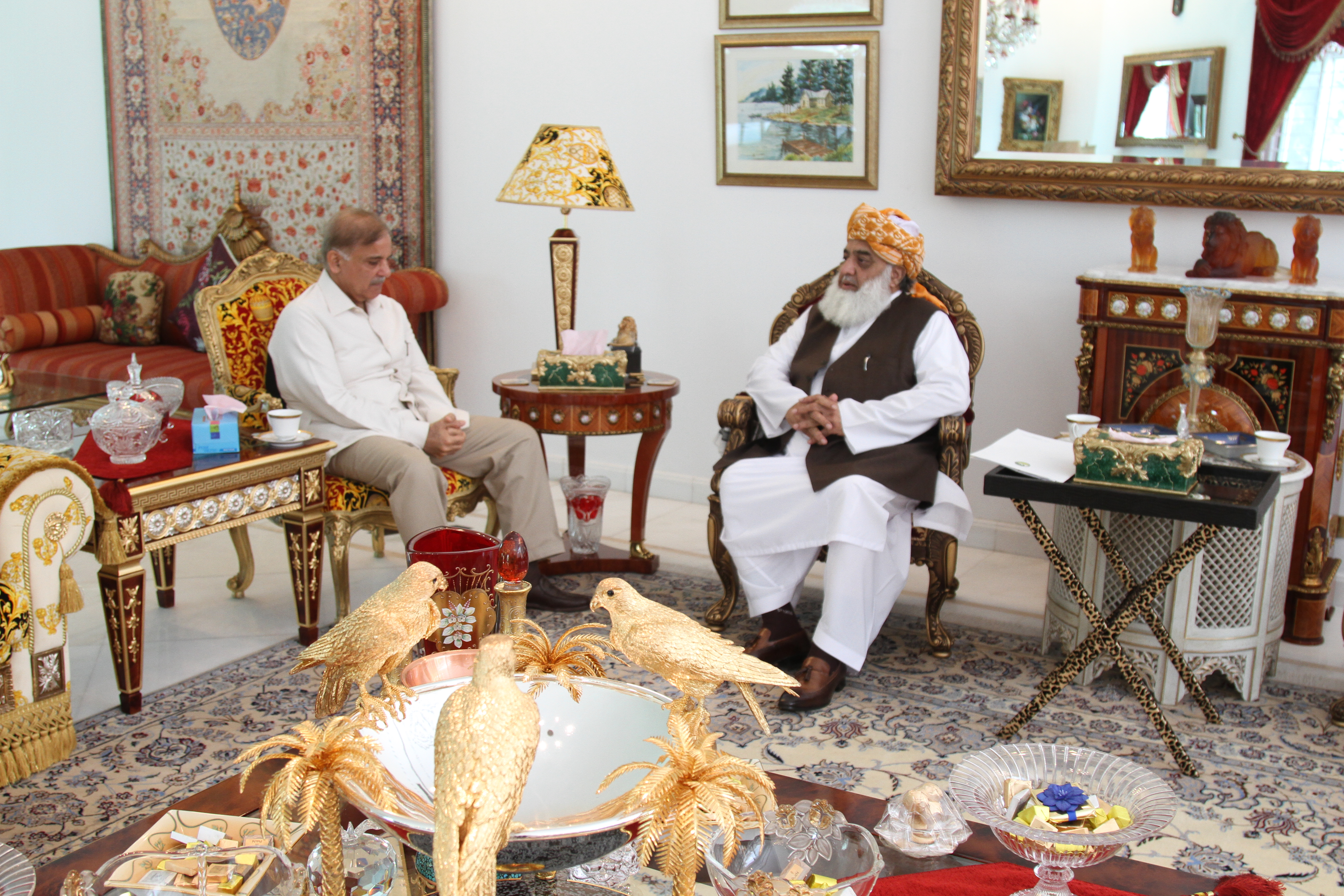
Rehman with Shehbaz Sharif in 2016

In May 2014, Prime Minister Nawaz Sharif gave him the status of a federal minister for being the chairman of special committee of the National Assembly on Kashmir. In August 2017, Prime Minister Shahid Khaqan Abbasi gave him the same status again. Upon the dissolution of the National Assembly on the expiration of its term on 31 May 2018, he ceased to hold the status of a federal minister. In March 2018, he became head of the Muttahida Majlis-e-Amal which was revived in December 2017. Fazal-ur-Rehman ran for the seat of the National Assembly of Pakistan in 2018 Pakistani general elections from Dera Ismail Khan's constituencies, NA38 and NA 39 but did not win.

On 27 August 2018, several opposition parties including Pakistan Muslim League (N), nominated him as a candidate in the 2018 presidential election. On 4 September 2018, he clinched 184 electoral votes behind Arif Alvi (352) and ahead of Aitzaz Ahsan (124) in the election.

=== Opposition to women-related bills ===
Fazal-ur-Rehman opposed the Huqooq-e-Niswan bill in 2016 claiming that it was un-Islamic. Fazal-ur-Rehman also rejected the Women's Protection Bill in 2016, which protects domestic violence victims, claiming that the judicial execution of Mumtaz Qadri was wrong and declared that he was a martyr, rallying other right-wing religious parties to do the same.

=== House arrest ===
In October 2001, Pervez Musharraf placed Fazal-ur-Rehman under house arrest in his native village Abdul Khel for inciting the citizens of Pakistan against the armed forces of Pakistan and for trying to overthrow the government of Pakistan.

Later in March 2002, Fazal-ur-Rehman was set free and the cases against him were withdrawn.

== Opposition to Tehreek-e-Insaf ==
On numerous occasions, Rehman has displayed severe opposition to Imran Khan and his political party, the Pakistan Tehreek-e-Insaaf (PTI). In 2013 Fazal-ur-Rehman declared voting for the PTI as haram (religiously prohibited), asserting Khan to be supported by the Western world and the Jewish lobby and explicitly calling him an agent of "Americans, Jews, Ahmadis and a person of ill character".

=== Azadi March ===
In late 2019 Fazal-ur-Rehman led a march towards Islamabad with the intent to sit-in, until PM Imran Khan resigned from office. The Azadi March which translates as "Freedom March" started from Karachi on 27 October 2019, and travelled Sindh and Punjab; other political parties also joined the march which reached Islamabad on 31 October 2019. Fazal-ur-Rehman also addressed the participants at different points on the journey. However, after extensive negotiations he ended the march on 16 November 2019.

=== Pakistan Democratic Movement ===
In 2020, Fazal-ur-Rehman was unanimously elected as the leader of the coalition of political parties against the PTI government, the Pakistan Democratic Movement. Nawaz Sharif even favoured this appointment to be on a permanent basis but was opposed by others.

== Assassination attempt ==
=== 2023 attack ===
Mufti Abrar, Fazal-ur-Rehman's spokesperson, stated that on 31 December 2023 the politician's convoy was fired upon from multiple sides at Yarik interchange in Dera Ismail Khan, Fazl-ur-Rehman's home city. While passing through DI Khan, the JUI-F chief's convoy was ambushed. In response to a question about his safety, he gave assurance that the veteran was in safe hands. President of the Pakistan Muslim League-Nawaz, Shehbaz Sharif, responded to the incident by denouncing the attack on Fazal-ur-Rehman's convoy and expressing relief over the politician's safety.

On 5 December during a press appearance in Islamabad, the politician commented:

"There is no police in Dera Ismail Khan, Tank, and Lakki Marwat. Can the polls be staged in this situation of unrest?".

Condemning the attack on the JUI-F chief, party leader Hafiz Hamdullah termed the incident as a nefarious move to prevent the party from taking part in the electoral process. Taking note of the reports, the Interior secretary has requested a report on the event. "Miscreants will not be allowed to spread chaos and sow discord in the country," said the spokesperson of the Ministry of Interior.

== Views ==
Fazal-ur-Rehman has been widely acknowledged as a "pragmatic" and "masterful" politician, earning praise from leading Pakistani journalists. Hamid Mir, Suhail Warraich, Saleem Safi, and Aniq Naji have commended his keen political acumen, referring to him as a "master at the art of politics." Wusatullah Khan has described him as the most brilliant politician of his time, while his legendary aptitude for deal-making and backdoor negotiations has solidified his influence across Pakistan's political landscape.

Suhail Warraich has written that his ability to navigate complex political terrains ensures his continued relevance, regardless of shifting political tides. Nicholas Schmidle, an American journalist, claimed that he was the most "sophisticated" and "effective" politician in Pakistan's political sphere. He is also sometimes referred as to the "university of politics in Pakistan" alluding to the fact that he is unrivalled in his political skills.

=== Taliban ===
He is a supporter of the Taliban government in Afghanistan and has demanded its international recognition. Fazal-ur-Rehman led several anti-American protests and pro-Taliban rallies in the major cities of Pakistan following the war in Afghanistan in 2001. He criticised President of United States George W. Bush, and threatened to launch jihad against the United States if the bombings continued. He also criticised and warned President of Pakistan Pervez Musharraf that he would be overthrown if he continued to support the war on terror.

=== Dinner with US Ambassador ===
According to leaked diplomatic cables, in 2007 then US Ambassador to Pakistan, Anne Patterson, requested a meeting with Fazal-ur-Rehman. Reportedly, Fazal-ur-Rehman asked her not to support any political party in politics, and questioned her support for Benazir Bhutto as Prime Minister. When she denied doing so, Abdul Ghafoor Haideri interjected that no one could become the PM without the tacit support of Americans in Pakistan. The ambassador wrote in her notes that Fazal-ur-Rehman sees himself as a kingmaker.

== Bibliography ==
=== Books by him ===
- Navīd-i Inqilāb: Maulānā Faz̤lurraḥmān Ke Inṭarviyūz kā Majmūʻah, 1987, 117 p. Collection of interviews on the political conditions in Pakistan. Edited by ʻAbdulvadūd Shāhid.
- Insānī Huqūq, 2000, 136 p. On human rights as interpreted in Islam, with particular reference to the role of NGO's in Pakistan. Edited by Raḥīm Ḥaqqanī.
- Z̤arb-i Darvesh, 2000, 446 p. Interviews on his anti-US movement; includes newspaper editorials and columns praising the movement. Edited by Riyāz̤ Durrānī.
- K̲h̲ut̤bāt-i Qāʼid-i Jamʻīyat, 2002, 2 volumes. Collection of speeches in defense of radical Islamic movements in different countries and against alleged American designs to rule the world. Edited by Momin K̲h̲ān ʻUs̲mānī.
- Mushāfihāt, 2017, 3 volumes. Collected interviews. Edited by Amīrzādah K̲h̲ān Yūsufzaʼī.

=== Books about him ===
- ʻAbdulqayyūm Shaik̲h̲, Maulānā Faz̤lurraḥmān Ka Siyāsī Safar, 2004, 514 p. On his political struggle.
- Momin K̲h̲ān ʻUs̲mānī, Maulānā Faẓlurraḥmān: Shak̲h̲ṣiyyat O Kirdār, 2017, 808 p. Biography.
- Maulānā Muḥammad Qāsim Ḥaqqānī, Mīr-i Kārvān̲ Maulānā Faẓlurraḥmán: Duniyāʼe Saḥāfat Kī Naz̤ar Men̲, 2017, 188 p. Collection of news articles on the politics of Faz̤lurraḥmān, published in various newspapers.

== See more ==
- List of Deobandis

== Notes ==
National Assembly of Pakistan
Preceded by Benazir Bhutto	Leader of the Opposition; 2004–2007	Succeeded by Chaudhry Pervaiz Elahi
