= Fatehullah Khan Miankhel =

Member of the National Assembly of Pakistan from Dera Ismail Khan (2024–2029)

- فتح ﷲ خان میاں خیل

Member of the National Assembly of Pakistan
- Incumbent
- Assumed office 29 February 2024
- Constituency: NA-45 Dera Ismail Khan-II

Personal details
- Born: Dera Ismail Khan
- Party: PPP (2024-present)
- Relatives: Ehsanullah Khan (nephew)

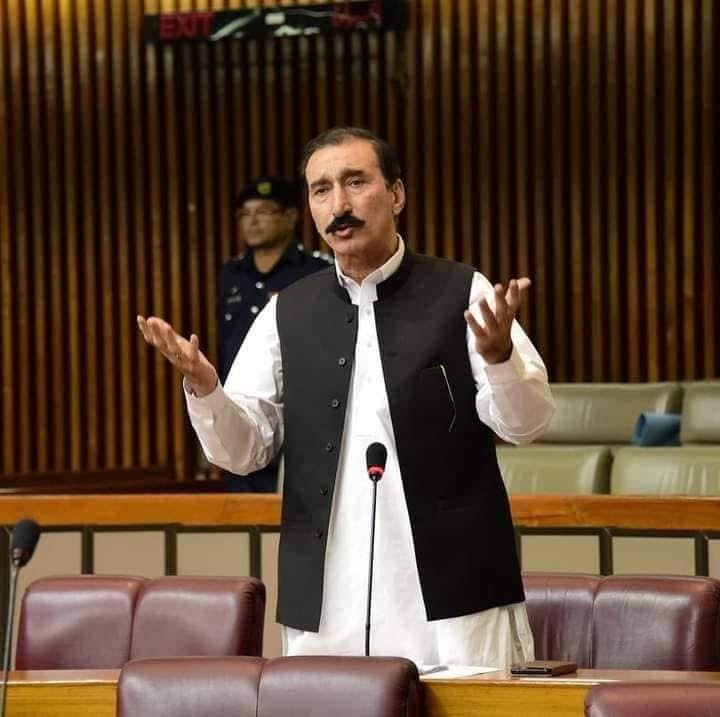
FatehUllah Khan Miankhel addressing the National Assembly of Pakistan

Fatehullah Khan Miankhel (Urdu: فتح ﷲ خان میاں خیل), is a Pakistani politician who is a member of the National Assembly of Pakistan since February 2024. He previously served as a member of the National Assembly and as the Mayor of Dera Ismail Khan twice.

== Political career ==
He contested the 1993 North-West Frontier Province provincial elections from PF-56 Dera Ismail Khan-V as a candidate of Pakistan Muslim League (N) (PML(N)), but was unsuccessful. He received 8,479 votes and was defeated by Inayatullah Khan Gandapur, an independent candidate.

He was elected to the Provincial Assembly of the North-West Frontier Province in the 1997 provincial elections from PF-56 Dera Ismail Khan-V as a candidate of PML(N). He received 9,802 votes and defeated Inayatullah Khan Gandapur, an independent candidate.

He became mayor of Dera Ismail Khan in 2002 and was the longest serving mayor of the city, serving for 8 years. He defeated Major Latif Ullah Alizai.

He contested the 2013 Khyber Pakhtunkhwa provincial election from PK-67 Dera Ismail Khan-IV as a candidate of PML(N), but was unsuccessful. He received 15,522 votes and was defeated by Israr Ullah Khan Gandapur, an independent candidate.

He contested a 2013 by-election from PK-67 Dera Ismail Khan-IV as an independent candidate, but was unsuccessful. He received 15,971 votes and was defeated by Ikramullah Gandapur, a candidate of Pakistan Tehreek-e-Insaf (PTI).

He contested a 2018 by-election from PK-99 Dera Ismail Khan-V as an independent candidate, but was unsuccessful. He received 25,303 votes and was defeated by Aghaz Ikramullah Gandapur, a candidate of PTI.

He was elected to the National Assembly of Pakistan in the 2024 Pakistani general election from NA-45 Dera Ismail Khan-II as a Pakistan People’s Party candidate. He received 56,933 votes and defeated Ubaidul Rehman, a candidate of Jamiat Ulema-e-Islam (F) (JUI(F)).
