= Gandapur =

Pashtun tribe in Pakistan

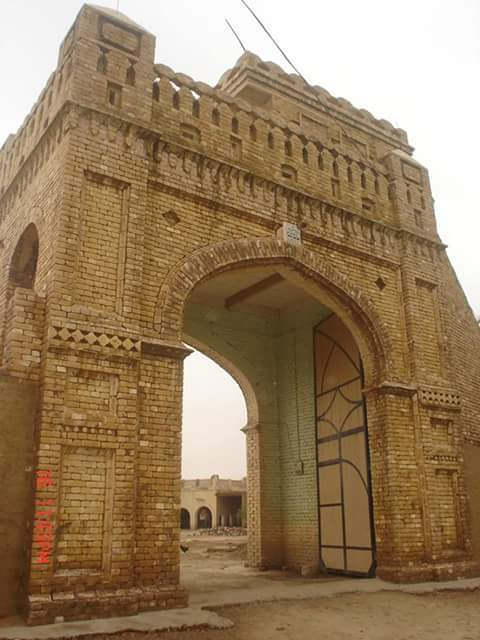
A historical gate associated with Gandapurs of Kulachi city

The Gandapur (Pashto: ګنډہ پور) also called Gandapore is a Pashtun tribe, which is based in Pakistan and Afghanistan. According to Simi Malhotra, they took their name from the Indo-Parthians king Gondophernes of house of Suren, while M. Jamil Hanifi and Richard N. Frye consider the origin of their name to be uncertain.

It is a Pashtun tribe that lives in the Damaan Valley of Dera Ismail Khan District and some parts of the District Tank of Pakistan. The majority of Gandapurs live in Kulachi Tehsil including Kulachi city and its surrounding villages like Luni, Rori, Takwara, Maddi, Kot Zafar Baladasti, etc., and in some of the villages of District Tank like Bara Khel, Gara Baloch etc. The tribe descended from the Afghan highlands to the plains of Damaan during the 17th century. The center of their winter quarters developed into a town in the 19th century, probably because of the trading activities of the tribesmen between Afghanistan and India.

The Afghan King Ahmed Shah Abdali named Gandapurs as Afghanpurs. The Gdpr tribe took part in Pashtun tribal wars during the 18th century. They also fought against the Sikh Empire (1799–1849). A part of the tribe also lives in Sur Kalay (سور کلے) in Ghazni Province of Afghanistan.

== People ==
- Sardar Asad Ullah Jan Khan, Member of Legislative Assembly
- Sardar Inayatullah Gandapur, Chief Minister of the North-West Frontier Province (1973–1975)
- Sardar Ali Amin Khan Gandapur, Chief Minister of Khyber Pakhtunkhwa (2024–present)
- Sardar Israr Ullah Khan Gandapur, Member of Parliamentary Assembly (2002–2013), Minister for Law, Parliamentary Affairs and Human Rights (2013)
- Sardar Ikramullah Gandapur, Member of Parliamentary Assembly, Minister for Agriculture (2013–2018)
- Aghaz Ikramullah Gandapur, Member of Parliamentary Assembly (2018–2023)
