= Nattuzai =

Pashtun tribe in Pakistan

Nattuzai (Pashto:ناتوزي) are part of the Gandapur tribe. Most of them live in Kulachi city but are scattered in the city and there is no Mohallah (Sector) after their name.

== Origin ==
An interesting anecdote about their origin quite popular in the Kulachi city is that they are not part of the original tribe of Gandapur and are rather the descendant of a Hindu Nathu Ram (Nattu being the local Pashto variant of Nathu). Nathu (or Nattu) Ram later embraced Islam and was so close with the Gandapur tribe that the elders of Gandapur tribe allocated him and his family share in the lands of Kulachi. The veracity of this claim cannot be verified and further research is required in this regard.

They are now part and parcel of the Gandapur tribe.
