= Yaqubzai =

Tribe situated in Afghanistan and Pakistan

Yaqubzai (Pashto: يعقوبزی) are a Pashtun tribe of Gandapur living in Afghanistan and Pakistan.

== History ==
Yaqubzais are the descendants of Yaqub, the eldest son of Gondophares. Yaqub, though the eldest one, was not the most brilliant of his four sons and hence the whole family of Gandapur was led by his second son, Ibrahim Khan. The descendants of Ibrahim Khan are known as Ibrahim Zai (sons of Ibrahim). Yaquzai are a small segment of the whole tribe of Gandapurs. They have played no worth mentioning role in the Gandapur tribe struggle to establish themselves at Kulachi, Dera Ismail Khan in the 16th century A.D.

The original name of Gondophares was Tairi Khan. He had four sons and a daughter. The names of the sons and daughter are as follows;

- Yaqub Khan (His descendants known as Yaqub Zai)
- Ibrahim Khan (His descendants known as Ibrahim Zai)
- Hussain Khan (His descendants known as Hussain Zai)
- Dre Plaara (His descendants are not known)
- Khubai the daughter of Gandapur. The descendants of her son Kamal are known as Kamal Khel.
