= Ehsanullah Khan =

Pakistani politician

Ehsanullah Khan Miankhel

Member of the Provincial Assembly of Khyber Pakhtunkhwa
- Incumbent
- Assumed office 29 February 2024
- Constituency: PK-115 Dera Ismail Khan-V

Personal details
- Born: Dera Ismail Khan District, Khyber Pakhtunkhwa, Pakistan
- Party: PPP (2024-present)
- Other political affiliations: JIP (2021-2024)
- Relations: Fatehullah Khan Miankhel (uncle)

Ehsanullah Khan is a Pakistani politician from Dera Ismail Khan District. He is currently serving as a member of the Provincial Assembly of Khyber Pakhtunkhwa since February 2024.

== Career ==
He was elected to the position of Tehsil Chairman of Daraban Tehsil as a candidate of Jamaat-e-Islami Pakistan in the 2021–22 Khyber Pakhtunkhwa local elections. He received 16,420 votes and defeated Babar Badshah, a candidate of the Pakistan Tehreek-e-Insaf (PTI).

He resigned on 29 December 2023 to contest the 2024 Khyber Pakhtunkhwa provincial election.

He contested the provincial election as a candidate of Pakistan Peoples Party Parliamentarians from PK-115 Dera Ismail Khan-V. He secured 31,861 votes. The runner-up was Aghaz Ikramullah Gandapur of JUI-F who secured 19,865 votes.

He was nominated for the position of Speaker of the Provincial Assembly of Khyber Pakhtunkhwa as the joint candidate of the PPP, Pakistan Muslim League (N), Awami National Party, and Pakistan Tehreek-e-Insaf Parliamentarians. He received 17 votes and was defeated by Babar Saleem Swati of the Sunni Ittehad Council, who received 89 votes.
