= Malakandi National Park =

National park in Pakistan

- مالاکنڈی نیشنل پارک
- IUCN category II (national park)
- Location: Mansehra District, Khyber Pakhtunkhwa, Pakistan
- Area: 19,971 acres (8,082 ha)
- Established: January 2022
- Governing body: Government of Khyber Pakhtunkhwa

The Malakandi National Park (Urdu: مالاکنڈی نیشنل پارک) is a protected territory situated in the Kaghan Forest Division of the Mansehra District, Khyber Pakhtunkhwa province in Pakistan.

== History ==
The provincial government designated it a national park in January 2022 in an effort to protect and conserve the flora and animals, as well as their habitats in varied ecosystems. This park is situated among the Nuri Bichla forest in the Jared subdivision, as well as the Malakandi, Mukhair, Chitta Par and Manna reserve forests in the Balakot subdivision. It covers an area of 19,971 acres.

== Controversies ==
The National Park is currently facing a significant threat due to a proposed de-notification. The Secretary to the Government of Khyber Pakhtunkhwa has initiated the process by submitting a summary to the Chief Minister. This action has been met with criticism from multiple stakeholders, including wildlife department officials, bio-environmentalists, and legal experts, who express concerns about the potential negative impacts on the environment and wildlife.
