= Israr Ullah Khan Gandapur =

Pakistani murdered politician (1975–2013)

Israr Ullah Khan Gandapur Minister

Minister for Law, Parliamentary Affairs and Human Rights
- In office 31 May 2013 – 16 October 2013
- Succeeded by: Imtiaz Shahid
- Constituency: PK-67 D.I. Khan-IV

Member of the Khyber Pakhtunkhwa Assembly
- In office May 2013 – October 2013
- In office 2008–2013
- In office 2002–2008

Personal details
- Born: 6 August 1975 Kulachi, Dera Ismail Khan District, Pakistan
- Died: 16 October 2013 (aged 38) Kulachi, Dera Ismail Khan District, Pakistan
- Party: PTI (2013-2018)
- Other political affiliations: QWP (2008-2013)
- Parent: Inayatullah Khan Gandapur (father)
- Relatives: Sardar Ikramullah Gandapur (brother); Aghaz Ikramullah Gandapur (Nephew)

Sardar Israr Ullah Khan Gandapur (Urdu: اسرار اللہ خان گنڈا پور; 6 August 1975 – 16 October 2013) was a Pakistani politician who had been a member of the Provincial Assembly of Khyber Pakhtunkhwa from 2002 till his murder by a terrorist suicide bomber. In his third term, he was serving as Minister for Law, Parliamentary Affairs and Human Rights at the time of his death.

== Murder ==
On 16 October 2013, Gandapur was murdered – along with at least seven other victims – by a suicide bomb blast on the first day of Eid al-Adha while greeting locals at his residence in Kulachi village. He was the third Member of the Provincial Assembly (MPA) killed by terrorists in a period of five months, following MPA Fareed Khan and MPA Imran Khan Mohmand.

== Brother's murder ==
After his death, his seat in the Provincial Assembly was won by his brother, Ikramullah Gandapur; Ikramullah was murdered by a terrorist in the 2018 Kulachi suicide bombing.

== Memorial ==
After the death of Sardar Israr Ullah Khan Gandapur, a government college was named in his honor.
