= Pride of Khyber Pakhtunkhwa Awards =

Pakistani provincial awards

- 11 February 2025
- Native name: فخرِ خیبر پختونخوا ایوارڈز
- Awarded for: Outstanding contributions to the advancement and promotion of Khyber Pakhtunkhwa's cultural, social, or economic development.
- Sponsored by: Government of Khyber Pakhtunkhwa, Directorate of Youth Affairs, Metrix Pakistan
- Country: Pakistan
- Presented by: Government of Khyber Pakhtunkhwa, Metrix Pakistan
- Established: 10 October 2024
- First award: 2024 Ammad Ali Muhammad Ali Swati Ayesha Ayaz Fayyaz Ahmed
- Website: https://prideofkp.pk

The Pride of Khyber Pakhtunkhwa Awards are prestigious honors presented annually by the Government of Khyber Pakhtunkhwa, through the Metrix Pakistan & Directorate of Youth Affairs

== History ==
The Pride of Khyber Pakhtunkhwa Awards were first announced in 2024 to celebrate the contributions of individuals in the region. The second edition of the awards took place in 2025, furthering the commitment to acknowledge and honor exceptional talent and service.

The first Pride of Khyber Pakhtunkhwa Award was presented to Ammad Ali for providing free training in digital marketing, freelancing, and entrepreneurship to more than 10,000 students from underprivileged areas of the province. He later received the Pride of Pakistan Award from President Asif Ali Zardari during the country’s 78th Independence Day celebrations. Aftab Ahmad A Earthquake Survivor, Huzaifa Behram Philanthropist/Entrepreneur & Jamshed Burki A travel blogger from South Waziristan

== Honorees ==
The Pride of Khyber Pakhtunkhwa (KP) Awards are an annual recognition presented during the Metrix Pakistan Youth Summit to honor individuals who have made significant contributions to their communities and respective fields within the KP province of Pakistan. Established to celebrate excellence across various sectors, these awards highlight achievements in areas such as philanthropy, environmental activism, entrepreneurship, sports, technology, and social work.

2024 Pride of KP Awards Honorees

Muhammad Ali Swati: Pakistani rescuer and philanthropist. - Muhammad Tawseef Khan: Climate change activist. - Ammad Ali: Entrepreneur and philanthropist. - Ayesha Ayaz: Taekwondo champion. - Muhammad Irfan: Social worker. - Qaiser Nawab: Global youth leader and climate activist. - Adil Nawaz Khan: Social entrepreneur and community leader. - Adnan Khan: Journalist. - Noorena Shams: Squash player. - Raja Ahmed: Technology strategist and entrepreneur. - Muddassir Shaffique: Telecom and IT solution specialist. - Sumera Shams: Politician and social worker. - Hamra Farhan: Social activist. - Farishta Noor: Social activist. - Talat Azam Khan: Mentor and community leader. - Rafiullah Kaki: Teacher and trainer. - Waqas Bloodwala: Blood donation activist. - Qaisar Akash Khan: Philanthropist. - Saira Shams: Social activist.

2025 Pride of KP Awards Honorees:

-Ahsan Ayaz (Professional Squash Player) -Ehsan Zaffar Abbasi (Young Pakistani Innovator) - Aftab Ahmad (Founder & CEO, Assort Tech) - Kashif Ali (Founder & CEO, TechKhwa) - Fayyaz Ahmed (Founder Director, - Jinnah Basic Schools & Colleges Mansehra) - Jamshed Burki (Travel Vlogger) - Adnan Khan (Social Worker/Philanthropist) - Zoha Malik Sher (CSS Officer) - Huzaifa Behram (CEO, LetsGrow) - Iqra Wakeel Khan (Karate & Jujitsu Gold Medalist) - Farzana Ali (Pakistani Journalist) - Dr. Muhib Afridi (Founder & CEO, HBK Arena) - Aqleem Orakzai (Mentor & Social Worker) - Masoud Afridi (GTF Taekwondo International Champion) - Aasiya Khan (Businesswoman & Former Minister) - Ubaidullah Khan (Martial Arts Champion)

== Categories ==
The awards encompass a wide range of categories, including but not limited to:

- Entrepreneurship
- Sports
- Social Services
- Education
- Environmental Sustainability

== See also ==
- Pride of Khyber Pakhtunkhwa Awards official Website
- Directorate of Youth Affairs, Khyber Pakhtunkhwa
