= 2018 Kulachi suicide bombing =

Terrorist attack in Pakistan

- Part of War in North-West Pakistan
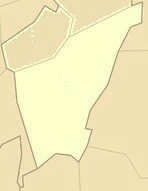
- Location: 31°55′58.18″N 70°27′39.75″E; Kulachi, Dera Ismail Khan District, KPK, Pakistan
- Date: 22 July 2018 (PST)
- Target: Ikramullah Khan Gandapur
- Attack type: Suicide bombing
- Weapon: Explosive belt
- Deaths: 3 (excluding suicide bomber)
- Injuries: 3
- Perpetrator: Tehreek-i-Taliban Pakistan (claimed)
- No. of participants: 1 (suicide bomber)
- Motive: Revenge of colleague militants of TTP

On 22 July 2018, 3 days before general elections, a suicide bomber blew himself near the vehicle of former KPK provincial minister of Agriculture Ikramullah Khan Gandapur in Kulachi, Dera Ismail Khan District, Pakistan. The prime target of attack, Gandapur was brought to Dera Ismail Khan in critical condition where he succumbed to his wounds. Apart from Gandapur, his driver and one of his guards was also killed and three more people were injured. Tehrik-i-Taliban Pakistan (TTP) claimed responsibility for the assault describing Gandapur's killing of their colleague militants as the motive. The attack was widely condemned across Pakistan.

== Background ==
=== Pre-election violence ===
Electoral candidates had been targeted since start of July to derail general elections. In the beginning of the month, a bombing took place in Ramzak Tehsil of North Waziristan at the office of Malik Aurangjeb Khan, Pakistan Movement of Justice's candidate for NA-48 (Tribal Area-IX), leaving 10 people injured. A week before the current attack in Bannu, a bomb planted in a motorcycle was remotely exploded at an election campaign of Muttahida Majlis-e-Amal's PK–89 candidate Shein Malik in the Takhti Khel area of the city. Two days prior to the attacks, a suicide bombing at an election rally of the Awami National Party's leader Haroon Bilour in Peshawar left 20 people, including Bilour, dead and wounded 63 others. On 12 July, the Balochistan Awami Party (BAP)'s office in Khuzdar came under gunfire before a bomb detonated injuring 2 people. 9 days before the assault, two bombings took place in Mastung and Bannu. In Bannu the bomb targeted former chief minister of KPK Akram Khan Durrani. Durrani remained unhurt but 5 people were killed and 37 others were injured. In Mastung, the prime target of the attack, Siraj Rasiani, who was to contest election on PB-35, was killed when a suicide bomber blew himself up killing 149 and injuring 186 others.

=== Target ===
Ikramullah Gandapur was main target of attack. A member of Pakistan Movement of Justice, Gandapur had served as KPK provincial minister of Agriculture and was to contest elections on PK-99. His brother and former provincial Law Minister of KPK, Israr Ullah Khan Gandapur was killed in a suicide explosion at his residence.

== Prior intelligence ==
Soon after the Peshawar ambush, National Counter Terrorism Authority (NACTA) forwarded 12 threats to federal and provincial interior ministries, following which committee chairman Rahman Malik directed authorities to enhance security of politicians named by NACTA. In its report, NACTA named six politicians that can be targeted. The list included Durrani. The other five politicians included Pakistan Tehreek-e-Insaf (PTI)'s chairman Imran Khan, Awami National Party leaders Asfandyar Wali and Ameer Haider Khan Hoti, Qaumi Watan Party's head Aftab Sherpao and Hafiz Saeed's son Talha Saeed. It also suggested that members of PML-N and Pakistan Peoples Party (PPP) were under threat. Following the Mastung and Bannu attacks, Nacta warned caretaker government of more attacks before polls.

== Bombing and aftermath ==
Gandapur was going for an election meeting when a suicide bomber, carrying around 10 kg of explosive material in his vest, blew himself up near his vehicle. As the bomb exploded, the limbs of assailant's body spread across the area. As a result, Gandapur, his driver and two of his police guards were wounded. All the injured were taken to District Headquarter Hospital (DHQ) in Dera Ismail Khan but later, citing to Gandapur's medical condition, he was taken to Combined Military Hospital (CMH) where he succumbed to his injuries. A video immediately after the attack was shot showing three unconscious injured in vehicle. Later his driver also died of his wounds. Four other people were injured. The bomb also included Ball bearing and pellets to amplify to intensity of detonation. On day after the attack, one of his guards died in DHQ raising the death toll to 3.

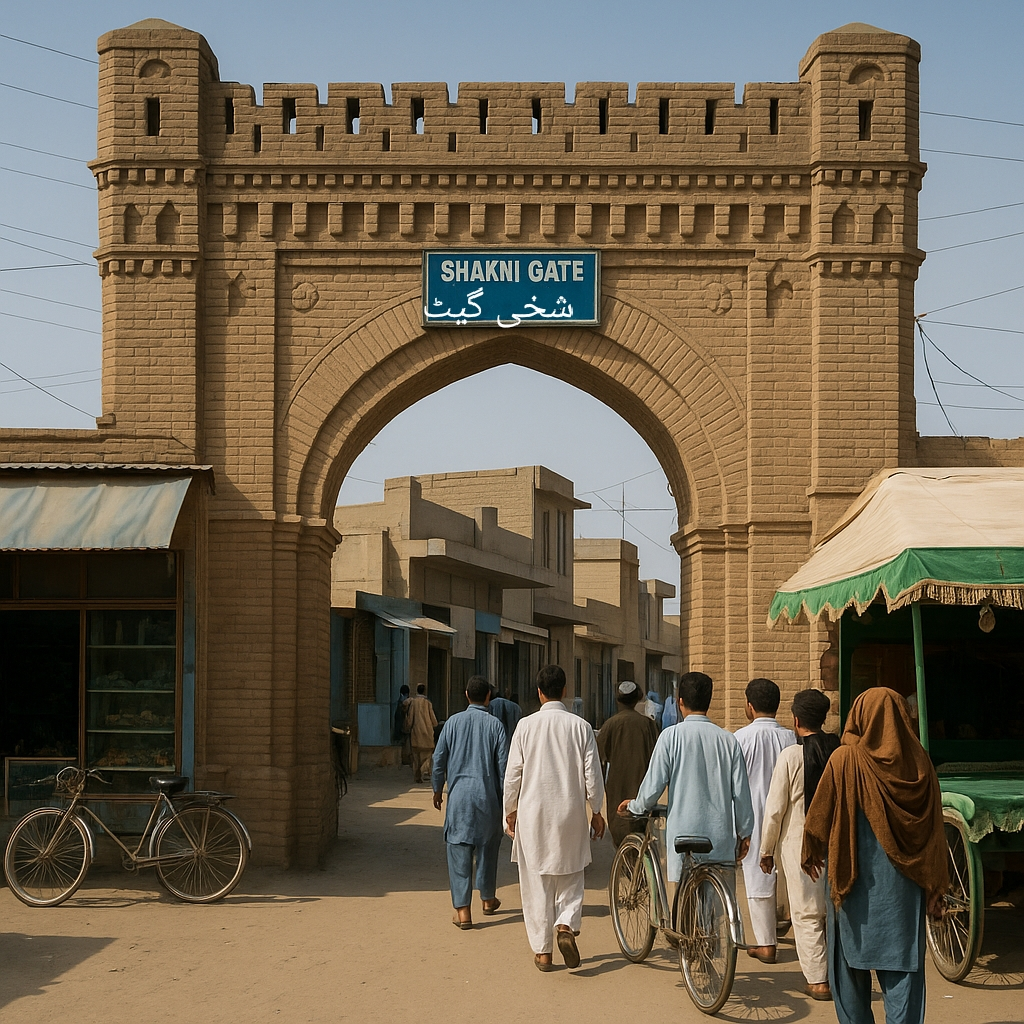
Shakhi Gate Kulachi

Soon after the attack, the caretaker chief minister of KPK Dost Muhammad Khan formed a committee to investigate bombing. Headed by chief of Counter Terrorism Department (CTD), the committee included Superintendent of police (SP), Superintendent of police (SSP), Deputy superintendent of police (DSP) and members from Intelligence Bureau (IB), Military Intelligence (MI) and Inter Services Intelligence (ISI). Following Gandapur's death, Election Commission of Pakistan (ECP) postponed elections for PK-99.

=== Gandapur's funeral ===
Gandapur's funeral took place on 23 July 2018 at the Kulachi Degree College. Strict security measures were taken citing to the attendance of many government and military figures.

== Responsibility ==
Tehreek-i-Taliban Pakistan (TTP) claimed responsibility for the attack. Muhammad Khurasani, organisation's spokesman said that Gandapur had killed their colleagues and his assassination was a revenge.

== Reactions ==
Caretaker Prime Minister of Pakistan Nasirul Mulk condemned the attack and expressed his grief. Chief Election Commissioner Sardar Muhammad Raza extended his sympathies to families of victims. He also sought a report form acting chief minister of KPK. Chairman of Pakistan Movement of Justice Imran Khan prayed for the victims. In a tweet, Director-General of Inter-Services Public Relations (DG ISPR) Asif Ghafoor wrote that Chief of Army staff expressed his grief over the incident. Pakistan Peoples Party's leader Faisal Karim Kundi denounced the attack. Chairman of Qaumi Watan Party Aftab Sherpao offered his condolences to the families of victims.

== Notable victims ==
- Ikramullah Gandapur, former politician

== See also ==
- 2018 Mastung and Bannu bombings
- 2018 Peshawar suicide bombing
- Terrorist incidents in Pakistan in 2018
