= 2017 Peshawar Agriculture Directorate attack =

Terrorist incident in Pakistan

- Location: 34°02′01″N 71°47′41″E; Peshawar, Khyber Pakhtunkhwa, Pakistan
- Date: 1 December 2017
- Target: Agricultural Training Institute, Peshawar
- Attack type: Mass murder, school shooting
- Deaths: 9 (+4 gunmen)
- Injuries: 35+
- Victims: University students and Forces
- Assailant: Tehrik-i-Taliban Pakistan
- Defenders: Police, Frontier Corps and Army

On 1 December 2017, 3–4 gunmen arrived at the hostel of Agricultural Training Institute at Agricultural University Peshawar and started firing as a result of which at least 13 people were killed and 35+ were injured. Tehreek-e-Taliban claimed responsibility for the attack.

== Background ==
Most students had gone home due to the long weekend. The hostel of the directorate was officially closed on Friday as the country celebrated Eid Miladun Nabi. It was the second attack in a week in Peshawar; on the same day, senior police official Mohammad Ashraf Noor was killed in a suicide attack in the Hayatabad area of the city. Previously, Taliban gunmen killed at least 20 people during a January 2016 attack on Bacha Khan University in Charsadda, while over a hundred children were killed in a terrorist attack on School on 16 December 2014, which killed 148 civilians including 132 schoolchildren.

== Attack ==
On 1 December 2017, 3–4 burqa-clad gunmen, later claimed to be affiliated with the Tehrik-i-Taliban Pakistan (TTP), arrived in a rickshaw at the Directorate of Agricultural Training Institute (ATI) in Peshawar. They shot the guard at the gate and then proceeded to the hostel of Agriculture Directorate at Agricultural University Peshawar and started firing. As a result, at least 13 people were killed and 35+ were injured. Three bodies and 16 injured persons were moved to the Khyber Teaching Hospital, next to the directorate, for treatment while 6 bodies of students and 18 injured persons were moved to the Hayatabad Medical Complex (HMC). A local journalist was also injured in the attack.

Immediately after the attack, security forces surrounded the building and cordoned off the area. The police, Frontier Corps (FC), and Army reached the campus, and an exchange of fire between the attackers and the law enforcement personnel took place and 8 to 10 people were evacuated. The ISPR and Khyber Pakhtunkhwa Police said all of the terrorists had been killed after a clearance operation by security forces. The area was being surveyed by military helicopters, while Peshawar's main University road (the major artery of the city) was closed for traffic. Seven students, four security officials, two watchmen and a journalist were among the injured. The Inter-Services Public Relations said two soldiers were injured in the attack and moved to the Combined Military Hospital for treatment.

== Responsibility ==
Inter Services Public Relations (ISPR) Director General Major General Asif Ghafoor said that the attack was planned, coordinated and executed by the Mullah Fazlullah group of Tehreek-e-Taliban Pakistan (TTP) and that the terrorists were in contact with others from Afghanistan. A spokesman of the Tehreek-e-Taliban claimed responsibility for the attack.

== Aftermath ==
The Agricultural Training Institute was closed indefinitely and an investigation began by the Counter Terrorism Department (CTD). Nine suspects were arrested from various areas of the provincial capital Peshawar after a joint search operation by police and security forces.

== Reactions ==
- Pakistan Tehreek-e-Insaf chairman Imran Khan condemned the militant attack on Directorate of Agriculture Institute of Peshawar. He applauded the KPK police and army for the operation.

He said "Saddened by condemnable terrorist attack in Peshawar this morning. My prayers to the victims and their families. Commend the rapid response of KP police and army that helped in containing damage and concluding the operation", and "The reformed professional KP police force with its special rapid response unit has made a difference in dealing with acts of terrorism in a timely, holistic and coordinated manner", he wrote.

- The Chief Minister of Khyber Pakhtunkhwa, Pervez Khattak strongly condemned the terrorist attack.
- Interior Minister, Ahsan Iqbal expressed his condolences for the affected families and said that Pakistan is united to destroy the aims of the terrorists, adding that "terrorists have nothing to do with Islam".
- The Punjab Chief Minister, Shehbaz Sharif condemned the terrorist attack, and said security forces defeated the terrorists with their timely response.
- The President of Pakistan, Mamnoon Hussain strongly condemned the terrorist attack, expressed his sympathies for the bereaved families, and prayed for the early recovery of the injured. He also praised the effective operation launched by the security forces against the terrorists.
- The Prime Minister, Shahid Khaqan Abbasi condemned the attack and swore to continue the war against terrorism till the end.
- Former President of Pakistan and Pakistan Peoples Party's co-chairman Asif Ali Zardari condemned the terror attack, extended condolences and expressed solidarity with bereaved families, whilst hoping for early recovery of those wounded in the attack.
- The Pakistan Peoples Party's chairman Bilawal Bhutto Zardari said that "terrorism is the biggest threat that Pakistan is fighting and that it is time to save the country".
- Nobel Laureate Malala Yousafzai strongly condemned the attack in which innocent people were killed. She tweeted: "When you pick up a gun in the name of Islam and kill innocent people, you are not a Muslim any more".

== See also ==
- 2014 Peshawar school massacre
- 2017 Peshawar police vehicle attack
- Bacha Khan University attack
- List of terrorist incidents in December 2017
