= Shakhi =

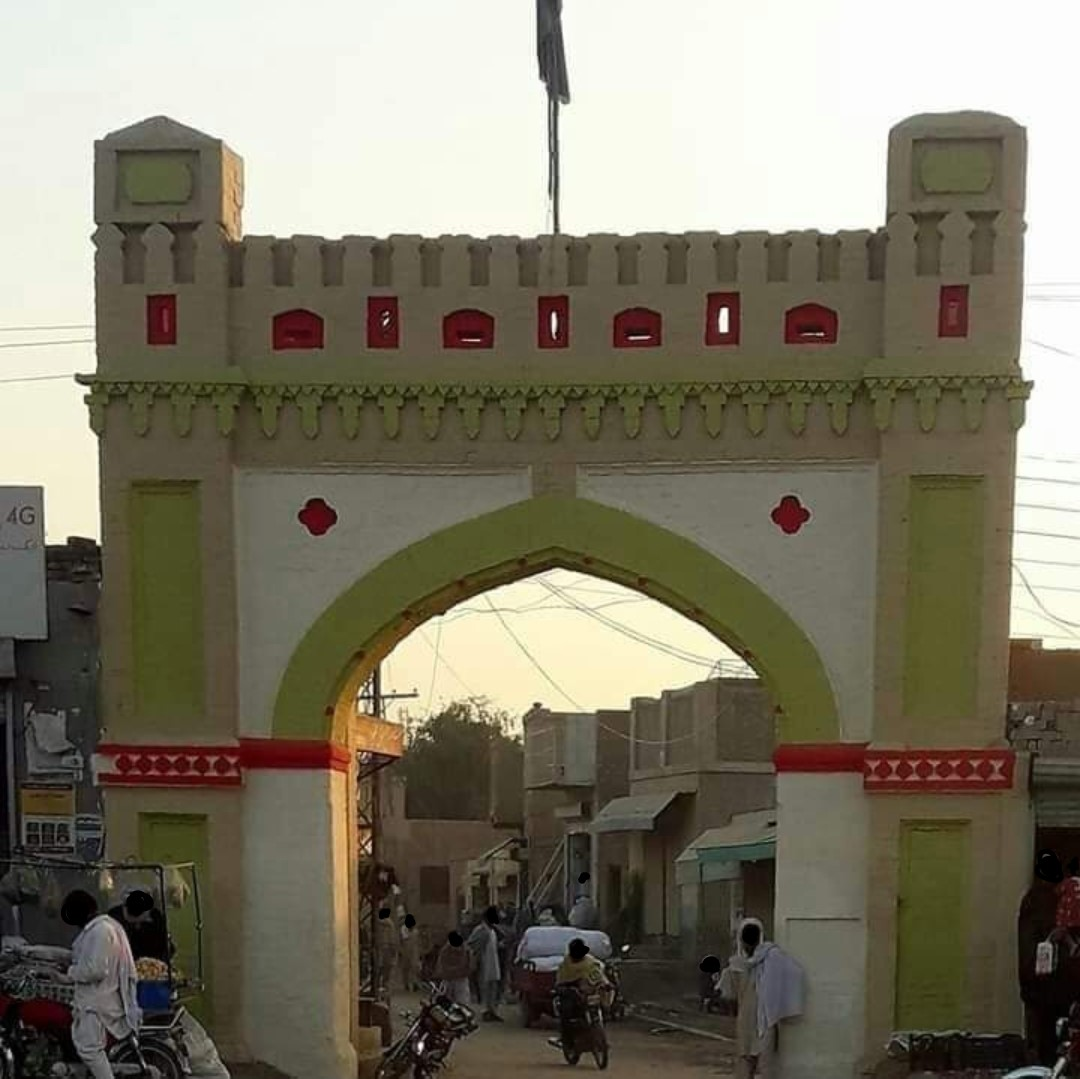
"Shakhi" gate is one of the famous gates which was named after the Shakhi caste

Shakhi reside in the northern part of Kulachi City, district Dera Ismail Khan, Pakistan. Shakhi is a clan of Gandapur tribe. The Shakhis live in Mohallah Shakhi inside Shakhi Gate. Shakhi Gate is of one of famous six gates of Kulachi City, located at the northern side of the city. It was named after the Shakhi tribe residing inside the Shakhi Gate. Shakhis are basically considered as brothers or cousins of Gandapur but with the passage of time they adopted and recognized themselves as Gandapur. They belong to Dray Plara. Dray Plara consists of Shakhi, Mareerha, and Hamarh. The Shakhi of Kulachi may not be confused with the Shakhi of sub cast Betani tribe which have entirely different identify. Although majority of Shakhi live in Mohallah Shakhi, Kulachi City, which is their homeland but they are also scattered in different cities in Pakistan including Dera Ismail Khan, Peshawar, Zhob, etc.
