= Muhib Ullah Khan =

Pakistani politician

Provincial Minister of Khyber Pakhtunkhwa for Agriculture
- In office 29 August 2018 – 18 January 2023
- Chief Minister: Mahmood Khan
- Preceded by: Sardar Ikramullah Gandapur

Member of the Provincial Assembly of Khyber Pakhtunkhwa
- In office 13 August 2018 – 18 January 2023
- Succeeded by: Sultan e Rum
- Constituency: PK-8 (Swat-VII)
- In office 29 May 2013 – 28 May 2018
- Constituency: PK-83 (Swat-IV)

Personal details
- Born: 20 December 1968 (age 57) Swat District, Khyber Pakhtunkhwa, Pakistan
- Party: ANP (2025-present)
- Other political affiliations: PTI-P (2023-2025); PTI (2013-2023)

Muhib Ullah Khan (born 20 December 1968) is a Pakistani politician who was the Provincial Minister of Khyber Pakhtunkhwa for Agriculture, in office from 29 August 2018 till 18 January 2023. He had been a member of the Provincial Assembly of Khyber Pakhtunkhwa from August 2018 till January 2023. Previously, he was a Member of the Provincial Assembly of Khyber Pakhtunkhwa from May 2013 to May 2018.

== Early life and education ==
He was born on 20 December 1968 in Swat District Pakistan.

He received a degree of Bachelor of Arts in 2016.

== Political career ==
He was elected to the Provincial Assembly of Khyber Pakhtunkhwa as a candidate of Pakistan Tehreek-e-Insaf (PTI) from Constituency PK-83 (Swat-IV) in the 2013 Pakistani general election. He received 10,995 votes and defeated a candidate of Pakistan Muslim League (N). In May 2014, he was inducted into the provincial Khyber Pakhtunkhwa cabinet of Chief Minister Pervez Khattak and was appointed as adviser to Chief Minister on Livestock, Fisheries and Cooperatives.

He was re-elected to the Provincial Assembly of Khyber Pakhtunkhwa as a candidate of PTI from Constituency PK-8 (Swat-VII) in the 2018 Pakistani general election.

On 29 August 2018, he was inducted into the provincial Khyber Pakhtunkhwa cabinet of Chief Minister Mahmood Khan and was appointed as Provincial Minister of Khyber Pakhtunkhwa for Agriculture.
