= Sardar Asad Ullah Jan Khan =

Pakistani politician

Sardar Asad Ullah Jan Khan Gandapur MCA, MLA
- Sardar Asad Ullah Jan Khan

Member of the Constituent Assembly Member of the Legislative Assembly

Personal details
- Born: 1888 Kulachi, Dera Ismail Khan District
- Died: 14 September 1966 (aged 78) Kulachi, Dera Ismail Khan District
- Citizenship: British Raj (1888–1947); Pakistan (1947–1966)
- Party: Indian National Congress; Jamiat Ulema-e-Hind; Muslim Nationalist Party; All-India Muslim League; Azad Pakistan Party
- Children: Sardar Atta Ullah Khan; Sardar Asmat Ullah Khan; Sardar Inayat Ullah Khan; Sardar Hizb-Ullah Khan; Sardar Hidayat Ullah Khan; Sardar Kiramat Ullah Khan
- Parent: Nawab Mohammad Afzal Khan (father)
- Occupation: Politician

Sardar Asad Ullah Jan Khan (also, Asadullah Khan and Asadjan Khan) was a Pakistani Pashtun politician from Kulachi, who represented North-West Frontier Province in the Constituent Assembly of Pakistan. Chieftain of the Gandapur tribal segment, Khan commanded influence in society; besides, he was a local land magnate. (Note: He had been a durbari for years.)

== Political career ==
=== British India ===
In the 1937 North-West Frontier Provincial Assembly Elections, Khan filed his nomination from Kulachi, a rural constituency reserved for Muslims, as an independent. He was pitted against Ramzan Khan from the Indian National Congress who accused him to be a kafir and even obtained a proclamation from Kifayatullah Dehlawi about the religio-moral responsibility of Muslims to vote for him. (Note: British intelligence dispatches record the election campaigns across the province to be characterized by a distinct communal flavor.) About half of the electorate skipped the polls, and Asadullah Khan scraped through barely. (Note: There were 5316 registered voters, of which only 2852 exercised their franchise. Ramzan Khan secured 1418 votes against Khan's 1437.)

In the Assembly, Khan joined the United Muslim Nationalist Party, a patchwork party formed by Abdul Qayyum Khan to form a coalition government in a hung House; the party remained in power for about six months, doing little of significance, before falling to Congress and disintegrating. Under the Congress Ministry, the Muslim League gained significant base in the province; (Note: As of the 1937 elections, Muslim League was yet to be a force in NWFP and did not participate in the elections.) its ascent was particularly aided by the British Government's outlawing of the Congress as a response to the Quit India Movement. In 1943, after a prolonged period of Governor's Rule, the League formed (Note: Seven Congress MLAs were indefinitely incarcerated on account of being involved with the Quit India Movement while seven other seats —none won by ML— felt vacant due to death etc. Despite, it remains doubtful, if the League did ever achieve confidence of the House - the installation was largely guided through by the British Officers who believed that a League Government would be less hostile to their interests.) the government; Asadullah Khan chose to side with the Congress initially but went on to join the League. However, the Muslim League had to bear the brunt of intense factional rivalries, winning over, and also losing, heavyweights at regular intervals. (Note: Scholars note that the local League had pretty little to offer in terms of meaningful politics and was essentially a network of patronage. In 1944, a central committee of the League arrived from Delhi to probe into local organizational discontents. It found the League lacked any organizational structure and was only a "citadel of few ambitious individuals"; accordingly, the existing League was dissolved and Qazi Mohammad Isa tasked with rebuilding the hierarchy from ground-up. That achieved little difference from the status quo, and would spur a series of reorganization attempts across the next few years but with negligible gains.) Asadullah Khan parted ways with the League in 1944, taking umbrage at the party's choice of candidate in the bye-elections from a warring tribal faction. (Note: The precise terminology is tarbur.) Soon, the Government fell to Congress.

In the 1946 elections, the Congress formed a stable government under the premiership of Abdul Ghaffar Khan. Khan was re-elected but as a member of the Jamiat-ul-Ulema-e-Hind, allied to the Congress. (Note: The '46 Provincial Elections were remarkable in that they appeared to vindicate Muslim League (and Jinnah) as the sole spokesperson for subcontinental Muslims and bolstered their campaign for Pakistan. Yet, Muslim League suffered a defeat in NWFP to INC and its allies, winning only 15 seats (of the 36) reserved for Muslims and 2 landholder seats out of a total 50 seats. Overall, there were 17 Muslims in favor of the League and 21 in favor of Congress.) He defeated Sardar Abdul Qaiyum Khan of the Muslim League. (Note: Khan received 4507 votes against Qaiyum Khan's 2332.) In July 1947, a referendum was held in the province with the options of joining either India or Pakistan. The Congress government called for a boycott citing the absence of provisions to remain independent or join Afghanistan; Khan adhered to the party line. However, while half of the legible voters did skip the referendum, over 99% of the votes cast were in favor of Pakistan.

=== Pakistan ===
==== Provincial Assembly ====
In August 1947, Jinnah requested Ghaffar Khan and his fellow legislators from Congress to concede that they did not have the confidence of the electorate and resign but was refused; within a week, Jinnah had Governor Cunningham dismiss the government (Note: Scholars find this to be the first constitutional crisis of the nascent state. Jinnah, realizing his lack of options to dismiss a government which has the confidence of the House, decided to bring back a colonial-era law that allowed the Governor-General to dismiss Provincial legislatures without any seemingly justifiable cause.) and install Abdul Qayyum Khan as the caretaker Chief Minister. Qayyum Khan convinced a few Congress legislators by force or favor to switch to the League but failing to secure a majority even by the end of the year, did not convene the House. In January 1948, Asadullah Khan ,along with six other Congress legislators (Note: They were Khan Muhammad Aslam Khan, Arbab Abdur Rahman Khan, Pir Shahinshah, Sahib Gul Khan, Abdullah Khan, and Mian Jaffar Shah.) met Liaquat Ali Khan at Lahore and joined the League, providing Qayyum Khan's government with the numbers; the House would sit for the first time after independence in March 1948.

In March 1949, Khan joined a group of fellow legislators from the League to pass a no-confidence motion against the government. However, a day before the resolution was to be tabled, most of them were imprisoned on grounds of conspiring to murder Qayyum Khan. Lacking the strength to effect a successful motion, Khan alongside five others, noted their discontent with Qayyum Khan's governance and requested the Speaker that they be not considered to be part of the government anymore; eventually, they became the new Opposition in the House replacing a group of three MLAs from the defunct Congress. (Note: Khan, speaking on behalf of the group, noted that they did not want to sit on the Opposition Benches in light of being committed to the League and asked for separate seats. The Speaker did not consent; Khan's request for being re-inducted into the Government was declined too.) Within a week, Khan and others were expelled from the League for a period of six years for "grave and flagrant breach" of party decorum.

==== Constituent Assembly ====
In March 1948, Khan was inducted as a replacement for Abul Kalam Azad the erstwhile representative of the province in the Constituent Assembly of India on a Congress ticket (Note: The Cabinet Mission Plan had reserved one seat in the Constitution Assembly per million people of a province. These seats were distributed among Muslims, Sikhs, and General (Hindus and others) category in proportion to their share of population in the province and were to be elected by legislators of the particular community. North-West Frontier Province was allotted with three seats, all of which were reserved for Muslims. Two Congress nominees —Azad and Abdul Ghaffar Khan—, and a Muslim League nominee —Sardar Bahadur Khan— were elected.) in the Constituent Assembly of Pakistan. One of the liberal members of the Assembly, Khan was among the three members (Note: The other two members were Shaukat Hayat Khan and Seth Sukhdev.) from West Pakistan to support Nur Ahmed's proposal of incorporating Bengali as an official language of the state alongside Urdu in the aftermath of the February 1952 events during the Bengali language movement. He was a strong critic of Pakistan's expenditure on defense and lamented the neglect of the agricultural sector.
