= Muhammad Yaqoob Sheikh =

Pakistani politician

Member of the National Assembly of Pakistan
- In office 13 August 2018 – 25 January 2023
- Constituency: NA-39 (Dera Ismail Khan-II)

Personal details
- Born: Dera Ismail Khan, Khyber Pakhtunkhwa, Pakistan
- Party: PTI-P (2023-present)
- Other political affiliations: PTI (2018-2023); JUI (F) (2011-2018)

Muhammad Yaqoob Shaikh is a Pakistani politician who was a member of the National Assembly of Pakistan from August 2018 until January 2023. He joined PTI in May 2018.

== Political career ==
He ran for the Senate of Pakistan from a technocrat seat from Khyber Pakhtunkhwa as a candidate of JUI(F) in the 2015 Pakistani Senate election, but was unsuccessful. He was defeated by Nauman Wazir of the Pakistan Tehreek-e-Insaf (PTI) and Muhammad Javed Abbasi of the Pakistan Muslim League (N) (PML(N)).

He ran for the Senate of Pakistan from a technocrat seat from Khyber Pakhtunkhwa as a candidate of JUI(F) in the 2018 Pakistani Senate election, but was unsuccessful. He was defeated by Azam Khan Swati of the PTI and Dilawar Khan of the PML(N).

He joined the PTI prior to the 2018 Pakistani general election.

He was elected to the National Assembly of Pakistan as a candidate of PTI from NA-39 (Dera Ismail Khan-II) in the 2018 Pakistani general election. He received 79,672 votes and defeated Fazal-ur-Rehman, the Ameer of the JUI(F), who received 52,327 votes.
