= Bacha Khan University attack =

2016 Tehrik-i-Taliban attack in Khyber Pakhtunkhwa, Pakistan

- Part of the War in North-West Pakistan
- Native name: دَ چارسدې يونيورسېټي حملې
- Location: 34°08′11.6″N 71°50′17.5″E; Charsadda, Pakistan
- Date: 20 January 2016; 9:30 am (UTC+05:00)
- Target: Bacha Khan University
- Attack type: Mass murder, school shooting
- Weapons: Assault rifles and grenades
- Deaths: 22+
- Injuries: 12+
- Victims: University students and faculty (including Syed Hamid Hussain)
- Perpetrator: Tehrik-i-Taliban Pakistan (Tariq Geedar Afridi faction) (Note: The word Geedar means "jackal" and also is a slang for coward in Pakistani society.)
- No. of participants: 4
- Defender: Syed Hamid Hussain

On 20 January 2016, four terrorists opened fire at Bacha Khan University (Pashto: باچا خان پوهنتون) near Charsadda, Pakistan. It is located in the Charsadda District of Khyber Pakhtunkhwa. At least 22 people were killed and over 20 others were wounded. Over 200 students were rescued from the premises, while the terrorists were killed by security forces. The Tariq Geedar Afridi faction of the Tehrik-i-Taliban, an internationally designated terrorist group, claimed responsibility for the attack.

On 23 January 2016, the Pakistani army laid the blame on a Taliban commander and the leader of its Tariq Geedar group, Khalifa Omar Mansoor alongside his deputy Qari Zakir. Mufti Khalid, one of the facilitator of the attack, was later killed in an ambush by unidentified person(s) in Kunar province of Afghanistan while he was travelling. Khalid was a central leader of Tehrik-i-Taliban and was a close associate of Mullah Fazlullah who was also killed in the same province.

== Background ==
Pakistan has been affected by years of militant violence, which has seen hundreds of suspected militants killed and arrested under a crackdown launched.

Education and educational institutions have been frequently under attack since Taliban took hold of valleys of Swat in early 2000s. They frequently attacked and burned schools in Swat valley during their years of hold. A young schoolgirl Malala Yousafzai strongly opposed the Taliban in her blogs. She was also attacked and seriously injured. Pakistan Army launched an operation in the valley during the time when Awami National Party (ANP) was in power in Khyber Pakhtunkhwa. The Taliban was effectively driven out of the valley in later years. Over the years, the Taliban have launched reprisal attacks on ANP leadership including Asfandyar Wali Khan, grandson of Bacha Khan. One of those attacks killed a government minister, Bashir Ahmed Bilour and only son of Mian Iftikhar Hussain, another minister.

A few days before the attack, authorities closed some schools in Peshawar because they believed an attack was being planned.

A nearby school was attacked and 130 students were killed in 2014. A mushaira (poetry gathering) to honour Khan Abdul Ghaffar Khan (secular Pashtun nationalist leader after whom the university is named) may have been the target, as he opposed the Mujahadeen against the 1979 Soviet invasion of Afghanistan.

== Attack ==
At 9:30 am, four men entered classrooms and accommodation blocks, opening fire on teachers and students; they were also armed with suicide vests. The attack happened as the students and faculty members gathered at the school for a poetry recital to commemorate the death anniversary of Gandhian Khan Abdul Ghaffar Khan. The university was reportedly not adequately secured, especially at the backside of the building, which had low boundary walls. Witnesses reported that an assistant professor, armed with a pistol, fired at the assailants.

According to provincial Health Minister Shaukat Ali Yousafzai, more than 30 people have been killed and over 60 wounded, including students and an assistant professor. More than 60 students were rescued from the premises. According to an army spokesperson, four gunmen have been killed. Provincial Public Health Engineering Minister Shah Farman said: "54 security guards were stationed at the university. Around 200 people were present in the examination hall, all of whom were rescued, and timely action by police and army has prevented large scale damage". The Education Department in Charsadda has announced the closure of all schools for 10 days.

Adnan Khan, a canteen owner in the university saw gunmen entering the university and instructed students to remain silent and turn off their mobile phones thus as a result saved many lives.

== Victims ==
Victims included 17 students, two gardeners, a caretaker and a professor. A later investigation revealed 21 people had been killed, mostly students at an all-male hostel. A security official said the death toll could rise to as high as 40 as army commandos cleared out student hostels and classrooms.

According to reports from eyewitness students, 27 years old assistant chemistry professor Syed Hamid Hussain died attempting to defend students with a pistol. Some eyewitnesses said his actions saved lives and delayed attackers for up to 15 minutes. There were also reports of a student armed with a pistol helping Hussain. The reports are conflicting with some saying he rushed out of the classroom and some saying he was killed on the spot where he confronted the attackers. Hussain is regarded as a hero of this attack in Pakistan.

== Perpetrators ==
The Dara Adma Khel branch of Tehrik-i-Taliban Pakistan claimed responsibility. The attack was believed to have been planned by Khalifa Omar Mansoor of Tehreek-i-Taliban Pakistan's Tariq Geedar Afridi faction, after he claimed the attack through a post on his Facebook page, adding that four attackers were sent to the university. Mansoor is also the alleged mastermind of the 2014 Peshawar school massacre. Mansoor told the media that the attack was in response to a military offensive against militant strongholds. Tehrik-i-Taliban Pakistan was reported to have been split into numerous factions which continue to conduct attacks across the country. However, the Tehrik-i-Taliban Pakistan main branch's spokesman, Mohammad Khurasani, denied the main faction's involvement in the attack. He also condemned the attack as "un-Islamic." Some sources claimed that phone calls of attackers were traced to neighbouring Afghanistan giving an indication that attack planners were based somewhere in that country. Pakistani media Dunya News alleged that the attack commander was in contact with the Indian embassy in Jalalabad (Note: Jalalabad is also the final resting place of Bacha Khan.) and attackers were paid 30 lac rupees by the embassy to carry out the attacks. Pakistan's former interior minister Rehman Malik also blamed Indian secret agency RAW for planning and carrying out the attacks.

On 23 January 2016, the Pakistani army spokesperson said that Mansoor was the mastermind and the attack was managed by his deputy Qari Zakir.

It was reported that the attackers gave stiff resistance to state security forces as they engaged in an operation to clear the university over several hours. Unnamed intelligence sources said eight to 10 attackers were inside the school and that they were between 18 and 25 years old wearing civilian clothes with their faces covered.

== Reactions ==
Prime Minister Nawaz Sharif, who was in Zurich to attend the World Economic Forum, said: "I'm deeply grieved over the attack, and we are determined and resolved in our commitment to wipe out the menace of terrorism from our homeland." Chief of Army Staff General Raheel Sharif reached Charsadda to boost the morale of the security personnel and took part in the operation. Speaking from the university, former health minister Shaukat Ali Yousafzai said: "This is a frontline province. We are fighting Pakistan's war in this province... The backs of terrorists have been broken and they are breathing their last. This stunt is an attempt to breathe life into their cause." A three-day mourning has been announced in the province by the Khyber Pakhtunkhwa government due to the attack. Pakistan observed National day of mourning and vigil on following Thursday.

The COAS shared details with the Afghan leaders based on investigations into the Charsadda attack, and informed them that the attack was being controlled from a location in Afghanistan through Afghan mobile phone by a Tehreek-i-Taliban Pakistan (TTP) operative. According to the ISPR branch of the Pakistan Army, the COAS telephoned Afghan President Ashraf Ghani, chief executive Abdullah Abdullah and USA commander in Afghanistan General John Campbell and shared information regarding attack on the university in Khyber Pakhtunkhwa.

Chief Minister of KPK Pervez Khattak cut his foreign tour and returned after learning about the news while provincial ministers reached the site as well. Pervez Khattak urged the federal government to take up the matter of terrorism with Afghan government and also send the Afghan refugees back to their country to improve law and order whom Pakistan have been hosting since 1979 Soviet invasion of Afghanistan.

Internationally, the attacks received condolences from world leaders including fellow Muslim countries, neighbouring India and most of the major developed countries in one way or another. UN Secretary General Ban Ki-moon was poignant on justice being brought to the perpetrators.

== Aftermath ==
The university briefly re-opened on 25 January and vigils were held, but faculty decided later that day to close the university until further notice. On 11 February, it was reported that security levels had been increased by raising boundary walls, adding barbed wire, watchtowers and increasing the number of security guards and CCTV cameras with a control room. A delegation reviewing the security recommended the campus move to a safer location near the motorway to Charsadda on a 62.5 acres (25.3 ha) site.

The university finally opened on 15 February 2016 after a closure of over three weeks.

Four men were arrested, including Qari Zakir's brother-in-law, for facilitating the attackers. The Pakistani army said they had helped them procure weapons, house them and purchased the rickshaw used to travel to the university.

Mufti Khalid, one of the facilitator of the attack, was later killed in an attack by unidentified person(s) in Kunar province of Afghanistan in 2021. He was previously a mastermind of attack on election rally in Pakistan in 2008. He was also wanted by Pakistani authorities for facilitating attack on Army Public School (APS) in Peshawar. Khalid was a senior leader of Tehrik-i-Taliban and was a close associate of Mullah Fazlullah who was killed in the same province.

== See also ==
- 2017 Peshawar Agriculture Directorate attack
- 2014 Peshawar school massacre
