= NA-45 Dera Ismail Khan-II =

Constituency of the National Assembly of Pakistan

- Constituency for the National Assembly of Pakistan
- Region: Paroa Tehsil, Daraban Tehsil, Drazanda Tehsil and D.I Khan Tehsil (partly) of Dera Ismail Khan District
- Electorate: 320,473

Current constituency
- Created: 2022
- Party: Pakistan People's Party
- Member: Fatehullah Khan Miankhel
- Created from: NA-39 (Dera Ismail Khan-II)

NA-45 Dera Ismail Khan-II (این اے-45، ڈیرہ اسماعیل خان-II) is a constituency for the National Assembly of Pakistan. The constituency was created in 2018 by bifurcating NA-25 (Dera Ismail Khan-cum-Tank) where Tank district shared its representation with a portion of Dera Ismail Khan District. In 2018, Tank District got its own constituency while the Dera Ismail Khan areas of the old constituency are now included in NA-39 (Dera Ismail Khan-II). In 2022 the Constituency number is changed into NA-45 (Dera Ismail Khan-II).

== Members of Parliament ==
=== 2018–2022: NA-39 Dera Ismail Khan-II ===
Election	Member	Party
2018	Muhammad Yaqoob Sheikh	PTI

=== 2023–present: NA-45 Dera Ismail Khan-II ===
Election	Member	Party
2024	Fatehullah Khan Miankhel	PPP

== 2018 general election ==
General elections were held on 25 July 2018.

General election 2018: NA-39 Dera Ismail Khan-II
Party	Candidate	Votes	%	±%
PTI	Muhammad Yaqoob Sheikh	79,334	49.63	
MMA	Fazl-ur-Rehman	52,031	32.55	
Others	Others (thirteen candidates)	28,499	17.82	
Turnout		166,165	50.59	
Total valid votes		159,864	96.21	
Rejected ballots		6,301	3.79	
Majority		27,303	17.08	
Registered electors		328,428		
PTI hold		Swing	N/A	

== 2024 general election ==
General elections were held on 8 February 2024. Fatehullah Khan Miankhel won the election with 56,944 votes.

General election 2024: NA-45 Dera Ismail Khan-II
Party	Candidate	Votes	%	±%
PPP	Fatehullah Khan Miankhel	56,944	37.41	▲31.18
JUI (F)	Obaid Ur Rehman	48,361	31.77	N/A
PTI	Shoaib Nasir (Note: Filed nomination papers as PTI candidate but ECP allowed him to run as an Independent)	23,112	15.18	▼34.45
PTI-P	Muhammad Yaqoob Sheikh	12,548	8.24	N/A
Others	Others (eight candidates)	23,795	15.63	
Turnout		160,268	50.01	▼0.58
Total valid votes		152,212	94.97	
Rejected ballots		8,056	5.03	
Majority		8,583	5.64	
Registered electors		320,473		
PPP gain from PTI				

== See also ==
- NA-44 Dera Ismail Khan-I
- NA-46 Islamabad-I
