= University of Agriculture, Peshawar =

Research university in Khyber Pakhtunkhwa, Pakistan

The University of Agriculture, Peshawar
- Type: Public
- Established: 1981
- Chancellor: Governor of Khyber Pakhtunkhwa
- Vice-Chancellor: Dr. Imran Khan
- Students: 7000+
- Location: Peshawar, Khyber-Pakhtunkhwa, Pakistan
- Nickname: UAP
- Website: aup.edu.pk

The University of Agriculture, Peshawar (UAP; Urdu: جامعہ زرعیہ پشاور، یا زرعی یونیورسٹی پشاور; Pashto: د کرنې پوهنتون، پېښور), is a research university located in Peshawar, Khyber Pakhtunkhwa, Pakistan. The university is ranked fourth in agriculture in Pakistan.

== History ==
It was founded in 1981.

== Academics ==
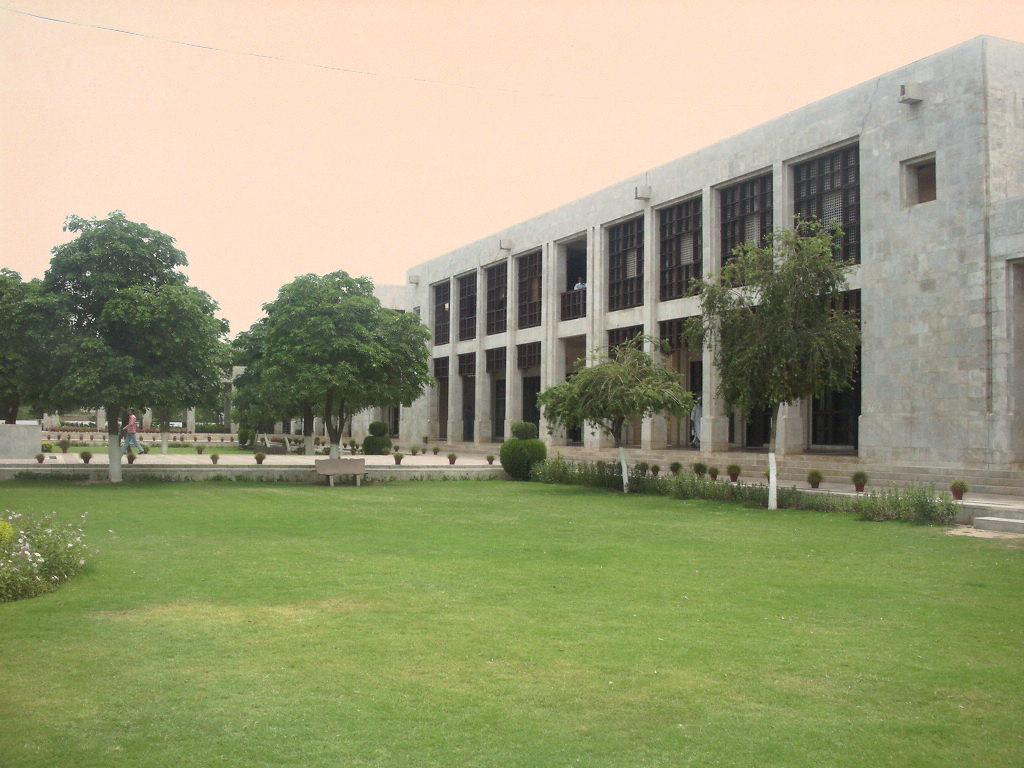
Administrative Block

The academic programs are divided into five faculties, each headed by a dean:

- Faculty of Crop Production Sciences
- Faculty of Crop Protection Sciences
- Faculty of Nutrition Sciences
- Faculty of Rural Social Sciences
- Faculty of Animal Husbandry and Veterinary Sciences

The university has three institutes:

1. The Institute of Biotechnology and Genetics Engineering (IBGE)
2. Institute of Business and Management Sciences (IBMS)
3. Institute of Development Studies (IDS).

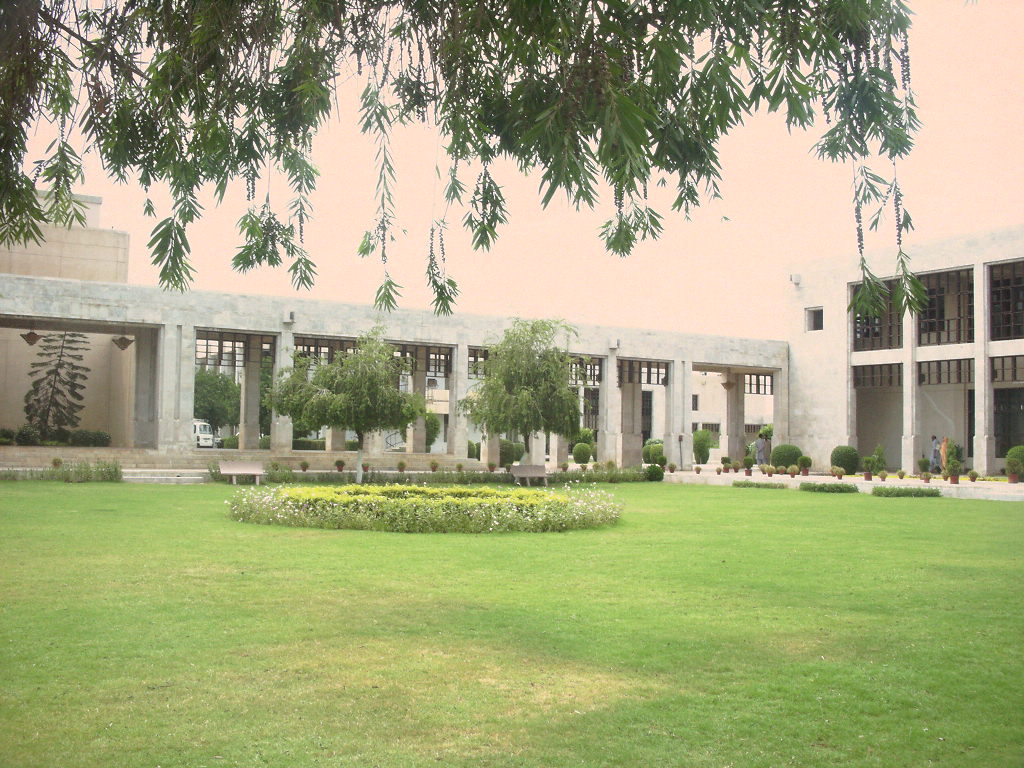
Agricultural University Lawn

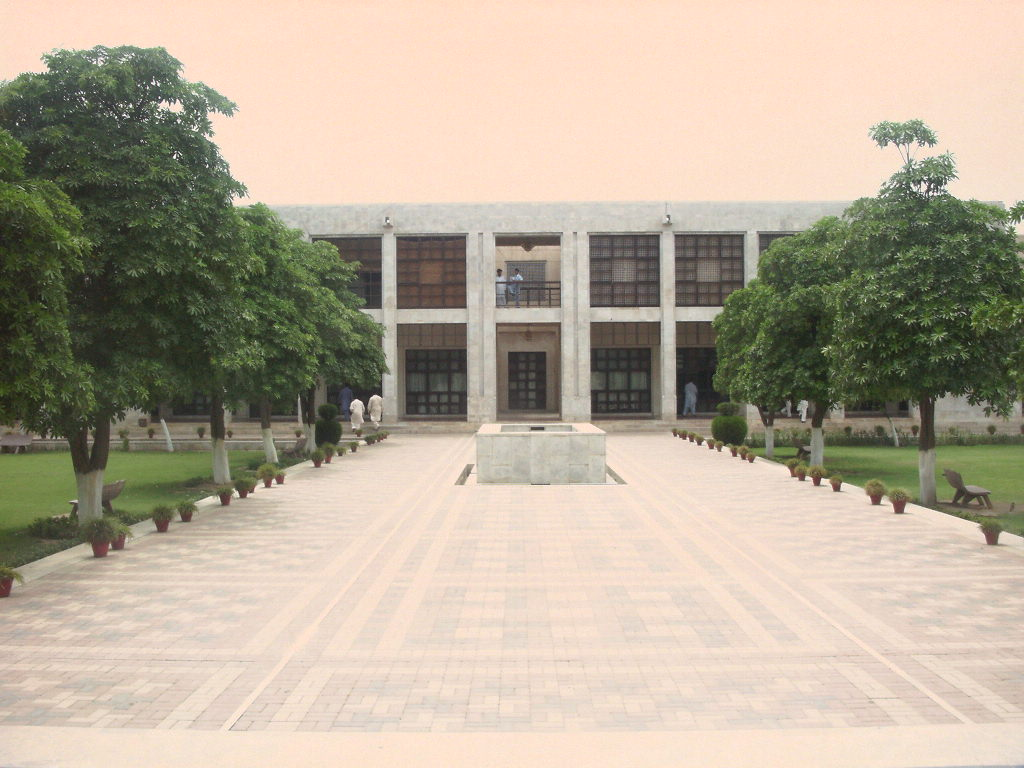
Admin Block

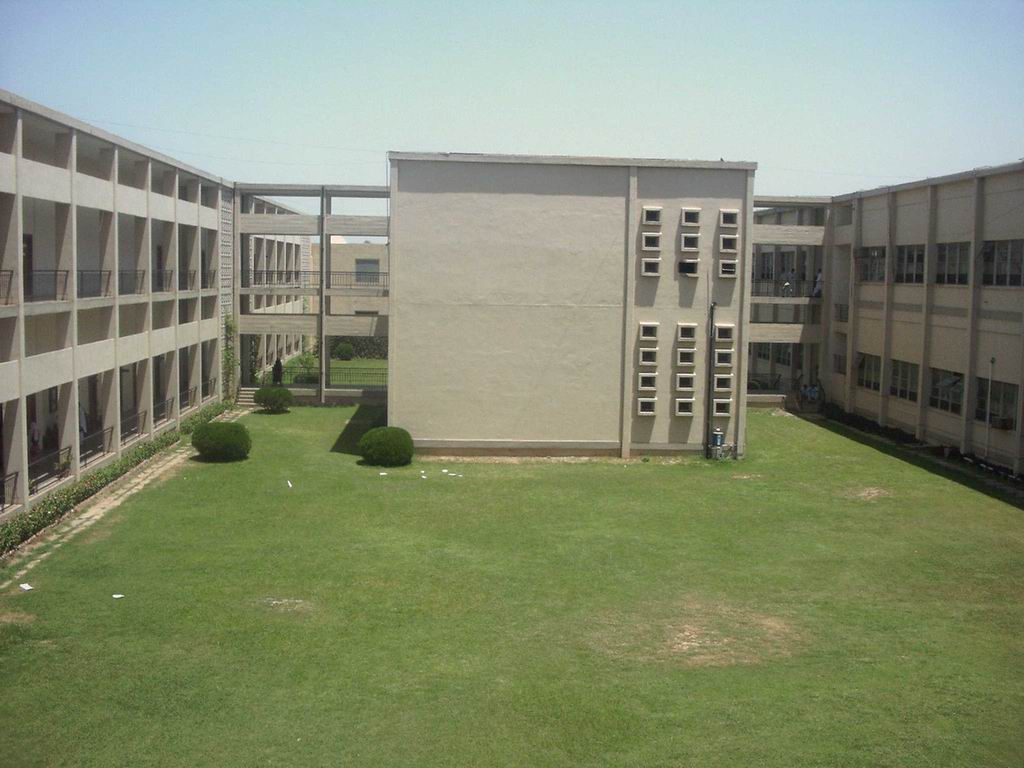
Lawn Old Plant Sci. Building

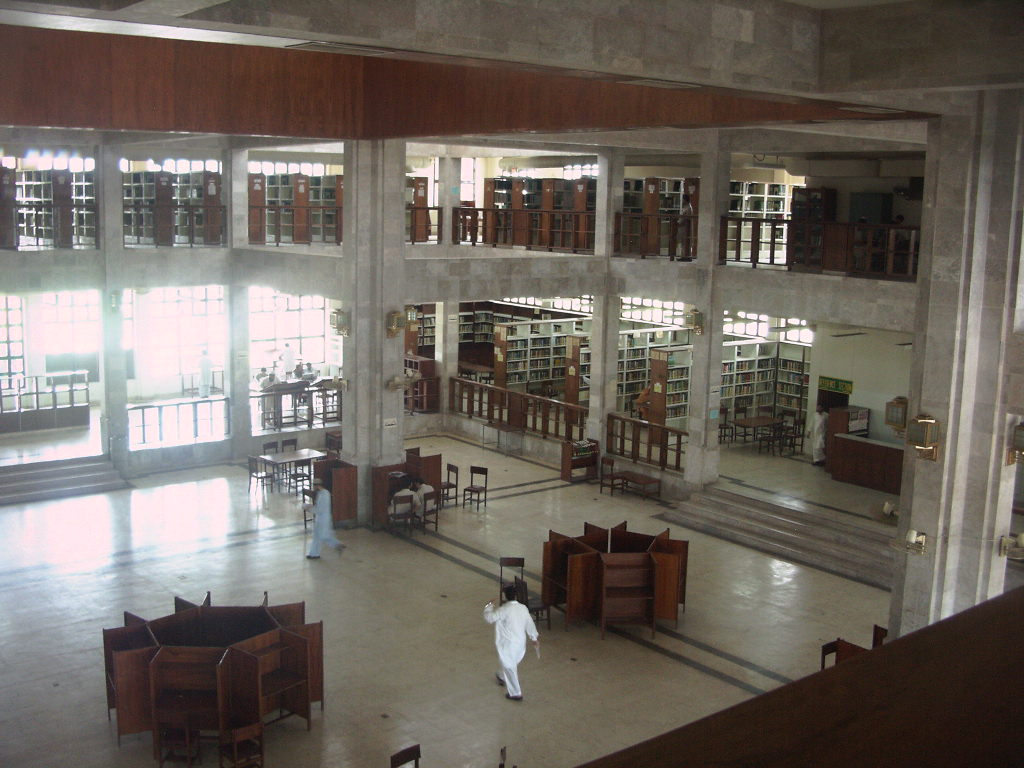
Main Library

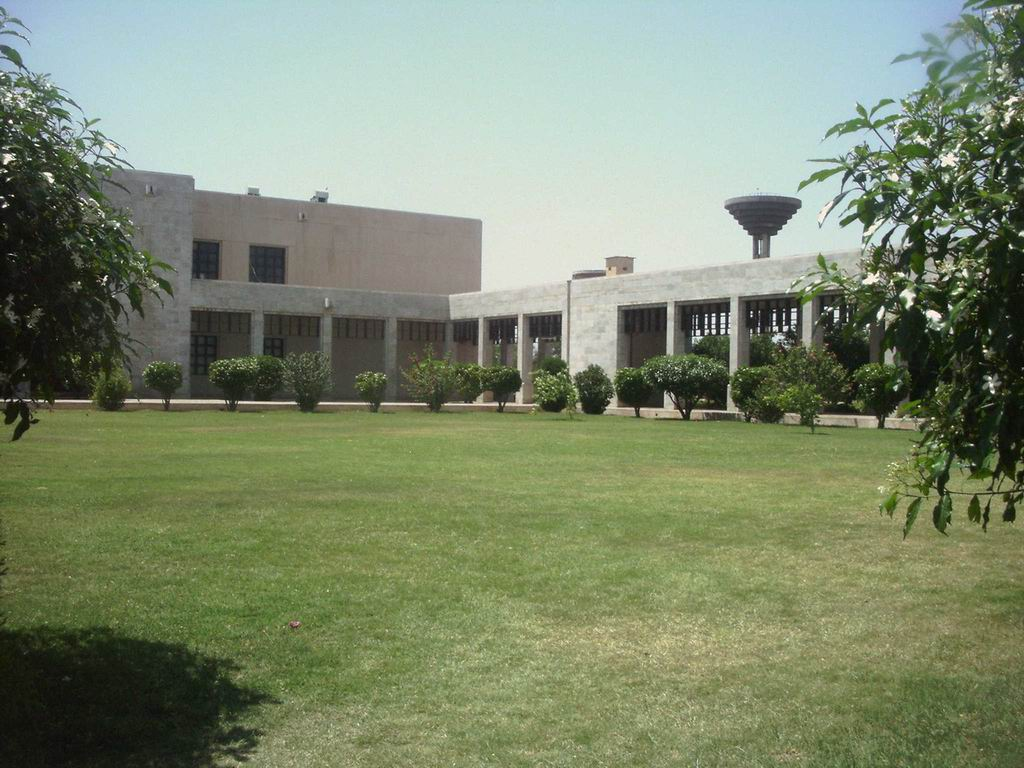
View to New Plant Science Building

=== Institute of Business and Management Science ===
Institute of Business & Management Sciences (IBMS) was established in 1998. Initially, only management science courses were offered, but now it also offers courses in computer science and information technology.

== See also ==
- Agricultural Training Institute, Peshawar
- 2017 Peshawar Agriculture Directorate attack
