= Tariq Gidar Group =

Pakistani militant jihadist group

- طارق گیدڑ گروپ
- Leader: Umar Naray †
- Dates active: 2001–2017
- Country: Pakistan
- Allegiance: Tehrik-e Taliban Pakistan
- Ideology: Wahhabism; Salafi Jihadism

Tariq Gidar Group (Urdu: طارق گیدڑ گروپ, abbreviated TGG) was a militant jihadist group based in Pakistan. The group was linked to Tehrik-e Taliban Pakistan and was mainly active in the Khyber Pakhtunkhwa region of Pakistan.

== History ==
The group faction was established in the 2000s and headquartered in Darra Adam Khel, Pakistan. During the late 2000s, the group claimed responsibility for many kidnappings and murders which include the beheading of Piotr Stańczak. The group also claimed responsibility for many attacks since 2010 which include the Bacha Khan University attack in Charsadda, Pakistan, and the 2014 Peshawar school massacre where 132 children and 9 staff were murdered. The group was also active in some parts of Afghanistan.

On 25 May 2016, the United States Department of State officially designated Tariq Gidar Group a terrorist organization, this also is with the designation of the group Jamaat ul Dawa al Quran.

On 13 July 2016, the US killed the leader of Tariq Gidar Group, Umar Naray, who had also masterminded the 2014 Peshawar school massacre in a targeted airstrike in Nangarhar Province, Afghanistan (before the Taliban take-over and the Fall of Kabul in 2021) near the Pakistani-Afghani border known as the Durand Line. The strike was also targeting members of the Islamic State – Khorasan Province with both being said in a Statement by-then United States press secretary, Peter Cook.

On 22 March 2019, the United Nations Security Council officially added Tariq Gidar Group onto the ISIL (Da'esh) and Al-Qaida Sanctions Committee.

According to the Pakistani government the group was destroyed during Operation Zarb-e-Azb. After this, the remnants of the Tariq Gidar Group, in Darra Adam Khel area, joined the Pakistani Taliban for their own survival.
