= Khyber Pakhtunkhwa Department of Agriculture =

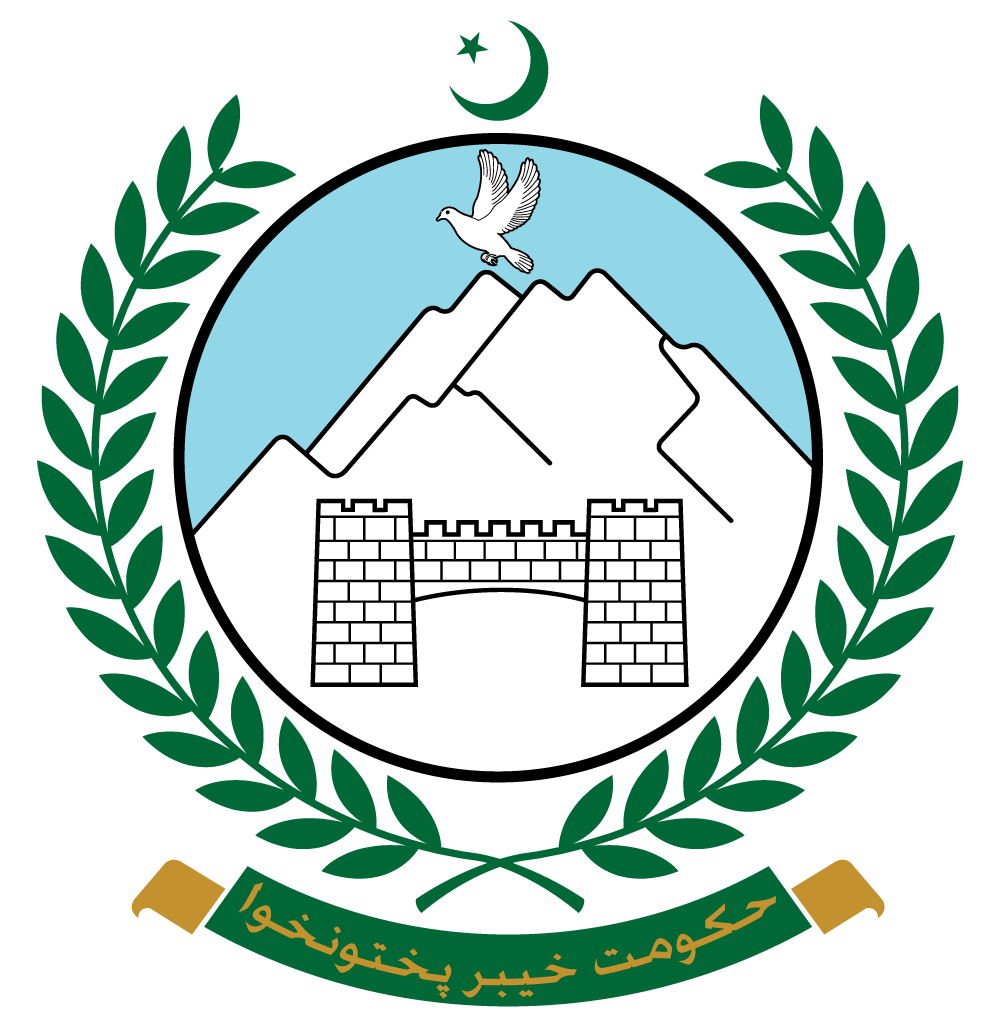
- Khyber Pakhtunkhwa emblem

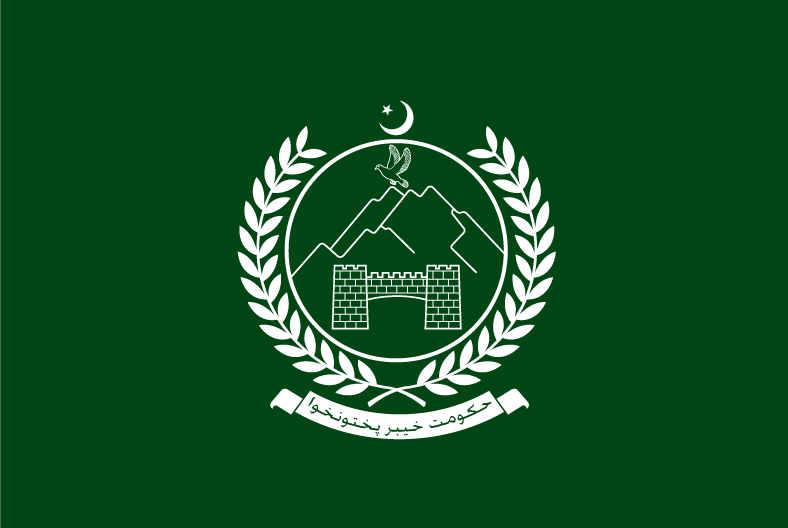
- Khyber Pakhtunkhwa flag

Agency overview
- Formed: August 14, 1973; 52 years ago
- Jurisdiction: Government of Khyber Pakhtunkhwa
- Headquarters: Peshawar, Khyber Pakhtunkhwa, Pakistan; 34°01′N 71°35′E
- Agency executives: Muhammad Sajjad, Minister; Atta Ur Rehman, Secretary
- Website: Official Website

The Khyber Pakhtunkhwa Department of Agriculture (Pashto: د کرنې رياست خیبر پښتونخوا, (Urdu; محکمہ زراعت خیبر پختونخوا) is charged with administering agricultural programs in the Pakistani province of Khyber Pakhtunkhwa, a mountainous region in the northern part of the country. The department is headed by the Minister of Agriculture who is a member of the Chief Minister's Cabinet.

The post of Minister of Agriculture is currently held by Muhammad Sajjad, who is part of Chief Minister Ali Amin Gandapur’s cabinet. This position was held by Mr. Ikramullah Gandapur, who was appointed as the first Minister of Agriculture part of PTI by Chief Minister Pervez Khattak on May 7, 2014.

== History ==
Created on August 14, 1973, the department's mission is to create jobs, promote agricultural growth, encourage sustainable development and improve living standards for the Khyber Pakhtunkhwa province.

== Organization ==
The department is under the control and supervision of the Khyber Pakhtunkhwa Minister for Agriculture, a political appointee of the Chief Minister of Khyber Pakhtunkhwa. The Secretary of Agriculture, also appointed by the Chief Minister, assists the Agriculture Minister in managing the department and assumes the duties of the Minister in his absence.

=== Structure ===
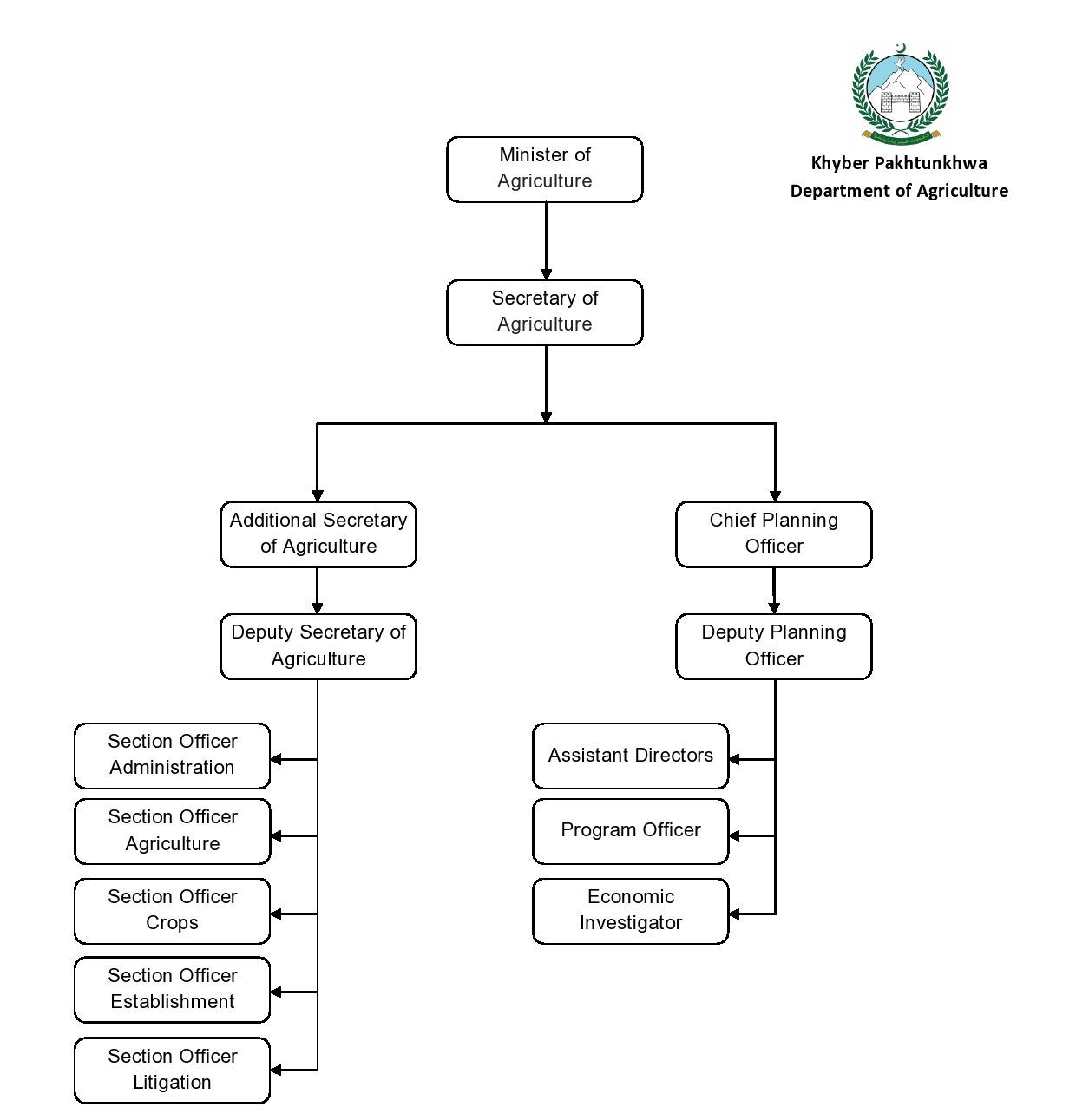
Organization Chart of the Khyber Pakhtunkhwa Department of Agriculture

- Minister of Agriculture
  - Secretary of Agriculture
  - Special Secretary of Agriculture
    - Additional Secretary of Agriculture
      - Deputy Secretary of Agriculture
        - SO Accounts & Cooperatives
        - SO Agriculture
        - SO Administration
        - SO Establishment
        - SO Litigation
        - SO Livestock & Fisheries
      - Chief Planning Officer
        - Deputy Director Planning Agriculture
        - Deputy Director Monitoring & Planning
        - Assistant Director Planning
        - Planning Officer
        - Assistant Statistical Officer
        - Agribusiness Officer

== Duties ==
Ministry roles include assessing emerging agriculture conditions, and emerging concerns in the Khyber Pakhtunkhwa area. Additional roles include advising the Chief Minister of agriculture-related matters. The Minister of Agriculture applies Department of Agriculture policies to carry out approved programs and generates public awareness of the department's policies.

== See also ==
- Agricultural Training Institute, Peshawar
