= Government of Khyber Pakhtunkhwa =

Provincial government in Pakistan

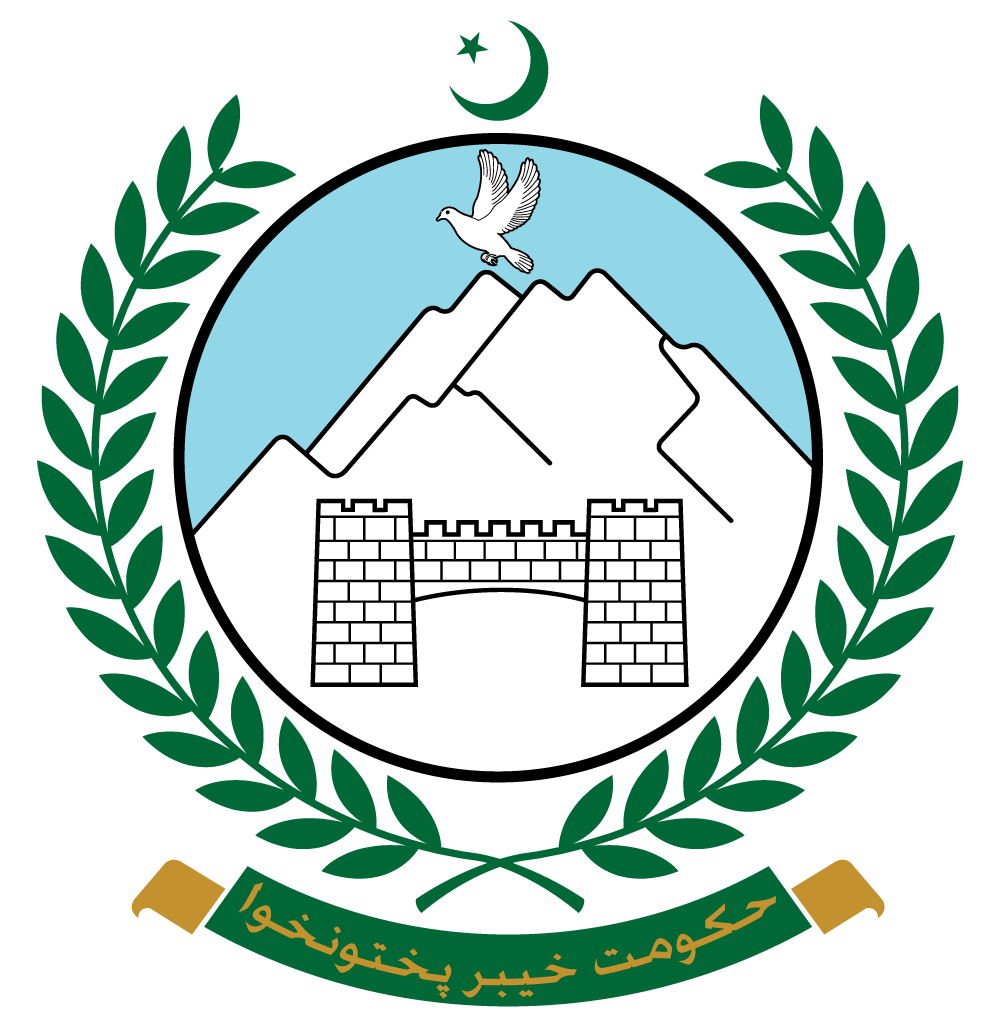

Legislative branch
- Name: Khyber Pakhtunkhwa Assembly
- Presiding officer: Babar Saleem Swati, Speaker

Executive branch
- Head of state
- Title: Governor
- Currently: Faisal Kundi
- Head of government
- Title: Chief Minister
- Currently: Vacant

Judicial branch
- Peshawar High Court
- Chief judge: Ishtiaq Ibrahim

The Government of Khyber Pakhtunkhwa (Urdu: حکومتِ خیبر پختونخوا; Pashto: د خیبر پښتونخوا حکومت) is the provincial government of the Pakistani province of Khyber Pakhtunkhwa. Its powers and structure are set out in the provisions of the 1973 Constitution, in which 32 districts come under its authority and jurisdiction. The government includes the cabinet, selected from members the Khyber Pakhtunkhwa Assembly, and the non-political civil staff within each department. The province is governed by a unicameral legislature with the head of government known as the Chief Minister. The Chief Minister, invariably the leader of a political party represented in the Assembly, selects members of the Cabinet. The Chief Minister and Cabinet are thus responsible the functioning of government and are entitled to remain in office so long as it maintains the confidence of the elected Assembly. The head of the province is known as the Governor, appointed by the federal government, on behalf of the President, while the administrative boss of the province is Chief Secretary Khyber Pakhtunkhwa.

The official and full name of the province is Khyber Pakhtunkhwa (formerly known as the Northwest Frontier Province). Often an abbreviation of "KP" or "KPK" is used by unknowing journalists and media outlets, although these terms neither appears in the Constitution, any treaties or in legal cases to which it is a party. The terms Government of Khyber Pakhtunkhwa or Khyber Pakhtunkhwa Government are often used in official documents. The seat of government is in Peshawar, thus serving as the capital of the province.

Since 11 October 2026, the government of Khyber Pakhtunkhwa is under governor's rule after Chief Minister Sohail Afridi was removed and detained.

== History ==
=== 2025 corruption scandal ===
In 2025, over Rs 40 billion was uncovered in the Khyber Pakhtunkhwa government's accounts, with investigations revealing systematic fraud spanning from 2020 to 2024. Rs 4.5 billion found in the account of a dumper truck driver linked to a fake construction business. The scam reportedly involved fraudulent cheques, fabricated records, and unauthorized payments for non-existent projects, primarily orchestrated through the Communication and Works Department of Upper Kohistan. The National Accountability Bureau (NAB) initiated the inquiry after credible reports of financial misconduct and is now conducting a full-scale investigation, examining the roles of government officials, contractors, and bank employees.

=== 2026 emergency declaration ===
In October 2026, after mass protests in support of imprisoned former prime minister Imran Khan, the federal government of Pakistan disbanded the PTI-led provincial government of Khyber Pakhtunkhwa and declared emergency rule. Hundreds of members from Khan's PTI party were detained by the authorities and the province's chief minister Sohail Afridi was placed in custody. The federal government justified this by accusing the PTI-led provincial government of failing to handle militant attacks.

== Structure ==
The Government of Khyber Pakhtunkhwa functions under the provisions of the Constitution of Pakistan (1973). The Province has a Khyber Pakhtunkhwa Assembly with 145 elected members, constituent of 115 Regular seats, 26 seats reserved for women and 4 seats for non-Muslims. The Provincial Assembly elects the Chief Minister of the Province who forms a Cabinet of Ministers to look after various Departments. The Chief Minister is the Chief Executive of the Province. The Federal Government appoints a Governor as head of the Provincial Government.

The bureaucratic machinery of the province is headed by Chief Secretary Khyber Pakhtunkhwa, who coordinates and supervises functions of various departments headed by departmental secretaries. The Chief Secretary is appointed by the Prime Minister of Pakistan. All the Secretaries are assisted by Additional Secretaries, Deputy Secretaries, Section Officers and other staff. The main departments may have attached departments and autonomous or semi-autonomous bodies to look after various functions.

Since the year 2001, the system of elected District Governments has been introduced. The Province is divided into 24 districts. The Districts are headed by a Zila Nazim or district mayor assisted by a District Coordination Officer, in charge of district bureaucracy. In a District, the functions are devolved further to the Tehsil, Town and Union Council Governments. Each District has an elected Zilla Council, elected Tehsil, Town, and Union Councils who look after various activities at their respective levels.

At the district level, a District Police Officer looks after the Law and Order and he reports to the Zila Nazim. Each district has a Public Safety Commission which addresses public complaints against the Police. There is a Provincial Police Officer who is in charge of the Police system at the provincial level.

== Legislative branch ==
Khyber Pakhtunkhwa Assembly 2019.

The Khyber Pakhtunkhwa Provincial Assembly is the legislative branch of the provincial government. It is a unicameral legislature.

=== Powers of Assembly ===
The Constitution grants numerous powers to Assembly. Enumerated in Article 123(3), 130, 141 and 142 the Constitution of Pakistan, these include the powers to manage the purse of the province, to keep checks on the policies and practices of the government and to make laws.

=== Makeup of Assembly ===
The Assembly currently consists of 145 voting members, each of whom represents a provincial district. The number of representatives each province has in the Assembly is based on each province's population as determined in the most recent Census. All 145 representatives serve a five-year term. Each district receives a minimum of one representative in the Assembly. In order to be elected as a representative, an individual must be at least 18 years of age and must be only a Pakistani citizen and his name appears on the electoral roll for any area in the Province. There is no limit on the number of terms a representative may serve.

== Executive Branch ==
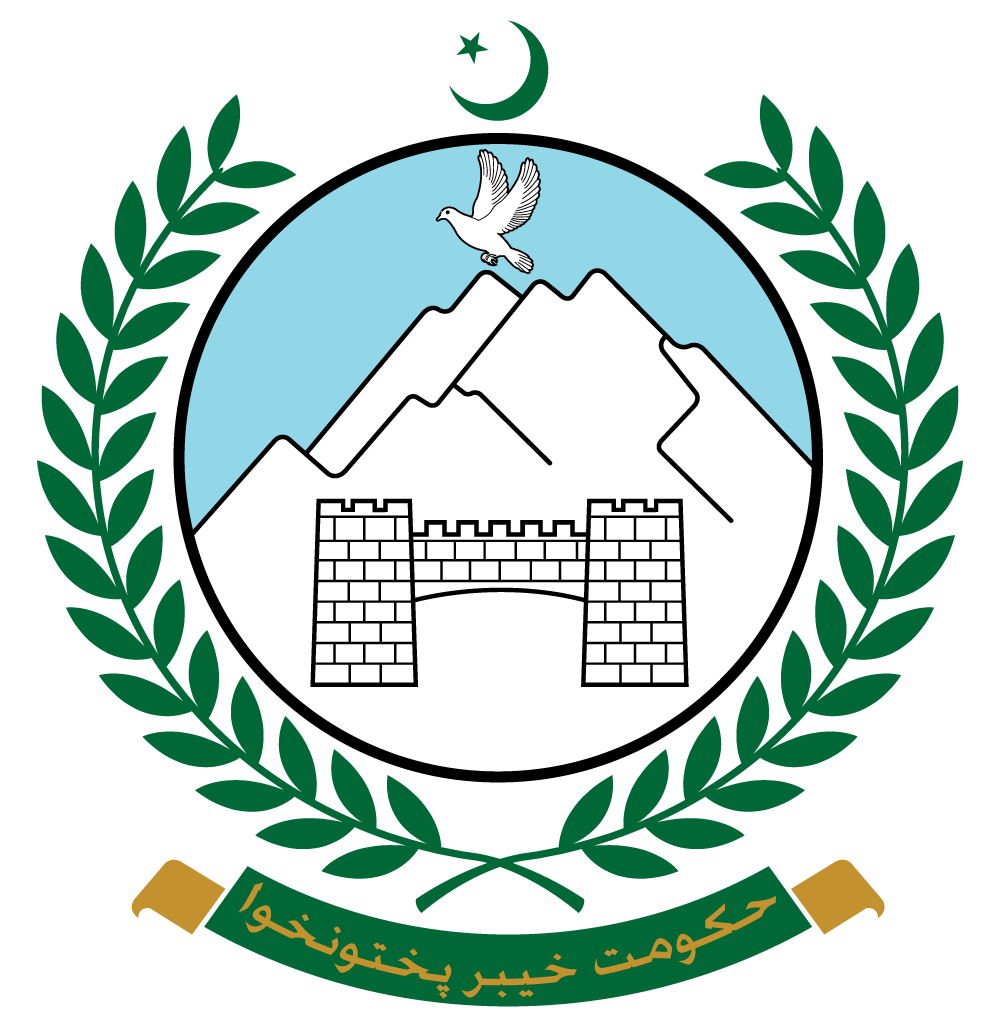

The executive post in the provincial government is the Governor of Khyber Pakhtunkhwa although power is delegated to the Chief Minister, Cabinet members, and other officials. The governor is designated by the President on the advice of the Prime Minister and Chief Minister normally regarded a ceremonial post.

=== Governor ===
The executive branch consists of the Governor. The Governor is the head of province. The Governor, according to the Constitution, must "take care that the laws be faithfully executed", and "preserve, protect and defend the Constitution". Governor Methab Ahmed Khan Abbasi resigned on 10 Feb 2016, because the charge of governorship was keeping him away from political activities. Fazal-ur-Rehman of JUI-F tried to grab the position for his own party but was unsuccessful and Prime Minister of Pakistan transferred the responsibility to his close associate Iqbal Zafar Jhagra on 4 March 2016.

The current Governor is Faisal Karim Kundi of Pakistan Peoples Party, who was appointed by Asif Ali Zardari. The Governor may sign legislation passed by Khyber Pakhtunkhwa Assembly into law or may veto in the case of a bill other than a Money Bill preventing it from becoming law unless two-thirds of Provincial Assembly vote to override the veto.

=== Chief Minister ===
The Chief Minister is the Chief Executive of the province hence is the head of government. Under the Constitution, the Chief Minister is Leader of House. In that capacity, the Chief Minister is allowed to vote in the Assembly.

=== Senior Minister ===
The Senior Minister is the deputy head of government. It is a ceremonial post to elevate a minister in the cabinet. Senior Minister is allowed to vote in the Assembly.

=== Chief Secretary ===
The Chief Secretary is the administrative boss of the province as the CS heads the provincial bureaucracy. The appointment of the provincial Chief Secretary is made by the Prime Minister of Pakistan

=== Secretariat Administration ===
The executive and legislative governance machinery of the province is structurally split into the Civil Secretariat (headed by the Chief Secretary) and the Provincial Assembly Secretariat (headed by the Secretary of the Assembly).

==== Civil Secretariat Leadership ====
- Chief Secretary of Khyber Pakhtunkhwa: Serves as the highest-ranking civil servant and administrative boss of the province. Governed by the Civil Servants Act, this officer directly supervises all Administrative Secretaries, coordinates provincial policies across all ministries (such as Finance, Home, and Health), and bridges communications between the provincial Cabinet and the federal bureaucracy.
- Administrative Secretaries: Grade-20 or Grade-21 senior management officers who individually spearhead specific provincial departments. They carry executive responsibility for budgeting, lawmaking drafts, and departmental operations, working closely with underlying regional Additional Secretaries, Deputy Secretaries, and Section Officers.

==== Provincial Assembly Secretariat Roster ====
The legislative assembly runs on an independent administrative framework tasked with parliamentary operations, legislative documentation, and member coordination:

- Syed Wiqar Shah (Secretary of the Assembly): Holds a Grade-21 rank as the chief executive officer of the assembly's secretariat. Responsible for advising the Speaker on parliamentary procedures, authenticating bills passed by the house, summoning sessions, and overseeing the entire legislative staff.
- Mr. Inamullah Khan (Senior Additional Secretary): Holds a Grade-21 rank, working as the primary administrative deputy to the Secretary. Manages upper-level secretariat strategy, procedural coordination for high-level assembly committees, and general house management.
- Syed Muhammad Mahir (Additional Secretary-I): Holds a Grade-20 rank. Specifically tasked with directing legislative procedures, bill drafting, managing assembly questions, and acting as the official Acting Secretary during designated secretarial transitions.
- Mian Altaf-ur-Rehman (Additional Secretary-II): Holds a Grade-20 rank. Manages the institutional administration, HR, deployment of lower-tier staff, and operational logistics of the assembly buildings and chamber offices.
- Naeem Ullah Khan Durrani (Additional secretary-III): Holds a Grade-20 rank as a senior management officer of the administration. Responsible for managing upper-level secretariat strategy, procedural coordination for departmental operations, and general administrative framework within the province.

=== Cabinet and Cabinet-Level Officials ===
The day-to-day enforcement and administration of provincial laws is in the hands of the various provincial departments, created by the Assembly to deal with specific areas of provincial and national affairs. The heads of the departments are chosen by the Chief Minister from members of the Provincial Assembly and then approved with the "advice and consent" of Governor generally known as the Chief Minister's "Cabinet".

==== Minister for Agriculture, Livestock, Fisheries and Cooperatives ====
Minister of Agriculture of KP
- Incumbent; Muhammad Sajjad since 7 March 2024
- KP Department of Agriculture
- Reports to: Chief Minister
- Seat: Peshawar
- Appointer: Chief Minister; with Provincial Assembly advice and consent
- Term length: No fixed term
- Formation: 14 August 1973
- Website: Official Website

The Khyber Pakhtunkhwa Minister of Agriculture is the head of the Khyber Pakhtunkhwa Department of Agriculture, concerned with Agriculture. The Minister is a member of the Chief Minister's Cabinet. Mr. Muhib Ullah Khan was appointed as Minister of Agriculture by Chief Minister of KP Mahmood Khan on 30 August 2018.

The duties of the minister revolve around Agriculture conditions and concerns in the Khyber Pakhtunkhwa. This includes advising the Chief Minister on matters of Agriculture. It strives to administer the department of Agriculture to carry out approved programs and make the public aware of the objectives of the department.

==== Khyber Pakhtunkhwa Minister for Finance ====
Minister of Finance of KP
- Incumbent; Muzzammil Aslam
- Final holder: Taimur Saleem Khan Jhagra

The Khyber Pakhtunkhwa Minister of Finance is the head of the Khyber Pakhtunkhwa Department of Finance, concerned with Finance. The Minister is a member of the Chief Minister's Cabinet. Mr. Taimur Saleem Khan Jhagra was appointed as Minister of Finance by Chief Minister of KP Mahmood Khan on 30 August 2018.

The duties of the minister revolve around Finance conditions and concerns in the Khyber Pakhtunkhwa. This includes advising the Chief Minister on matters of Finance. It strives to administer the department of Finance to carry out approved programs and make the public aware of the objectives of the department.

==== Minister of Excise & Taxation ====
Minister of Excise & Taxation of KP
- Incumbent; Khaliq-ur-Rehman since 7 March 2024
- KP Department of Excise & Taxation
- Reports to: Chief Minister
- Seat: Peshawar
- Appointer: Chief Minister; with Provincial Assembly advice and consent
- Term length: No fixed term
- Formation: 14 August 1973
- Website: Official Website

The Khyber Pakhtunkhwa Minister of Excise & Taxation is the head of the Khyber Pakhtunkhwa Department of Excise & Taxation, concerned with Excise & Taxation. The Minister is a member of the Chief Minister's Cabinet.

Mr. Jamshaid Uddin was appointed as Minister of Excise & Taxation by Chief Minister of KP Pervez Khattak on 7 May 2014. The office is currently without a Minister.

The duties of the minister revolve around Excise & Taxation conditions and concerns. This includes advising the Chief Minister on matters of Excise & Taxation. It strives to administer the department of Excise & Taxation to carry out approved programs and make the public aware of the objectives of the department.

==== Minister of Health ====
Minister of Health of KP
- Incumbent; Ihtisham Ali
- Seat: Peshawar
- Appointer: Chief Minister of Khyber Pakhtunkhwa
- Term length: No Fixed term
- Final holder: Syed Qasim Ali Shah

The Khyber Pakhtunkhwa Minister of Health is the head of the Khyber Pakhtunkhwa Department of Health, concerned with health matters. The Minister is a member of the Chief Minister's Cabinet. Mr. Hisham Inamullah Khan was appointed as Minister of Health by Chief Minister of KP Mahmood Khan on 30 August 2018.

The duties of the secretary revolve around human conditions and concerns in the Khyber Pakhtunkhwa. This includes advising the Chief Minister on matters of health. It strives to administer the department of Health to carry out approved programs and make the public aware of the objectives of the department.

==== Minister of Local Government, Elections & Rural Development ====
Minister of Local Government of KP
- Incumbent; Arshad Ayub Khan since 7 March 2024
- Local Government, Elections and Rural Development
- Seat: Peshawar
- Appointer: Chief Minister of Khyber Pakhtunkhwa

The Khyber Pakhtunkhwa Minister of Local Government is the head of the Khyber Pakhtunkhwa Department of Local Government, concerned with Local Government. The Minister is a member of the Chief Minister's Cabinet. Mr. Shahram Khan was appointed as Minister of Local Government by Chief Minister of KP Mahmood Khan on 30 August 2018.

The duties of the minister revolve around Local Government conditions and concerns in the Khyber Pakhtunkhwa. This includes advising the Chief Minister on matters of Local Government. It strives to administer the department of Local Government to carry out approved programs and make the public aware of the objectives of the department.

==== Minister of Minerals Development ====
Minister of Minerals Development of KP
- Incumbent (Unnocupied)
- Reports to: Chief Minister of Khyber Pakhtunkhwa
- Appointer: Chief Minister of Khyber Pakhtunkhwa
- Term length: No Fixed term

The Khyber Pakhtunkhwa Minister of Minerals Development is the head of the Khyber Pakhtunkhwa Department of Minerals Development, concerned with Minerals Development. The Minister is a member of the Chief Minister's Cabinet. Mr. Amjad Ali was appointed as Minister of Minerals Development by Chief Minister of KP Mahmood Khan on 30 August 2018.

The duties of the minister revolve around Minerals Development conditions and concerns in the Khyber Pakhtunkhwa. This includes advising the Chief Minister on matters of Minerals Development. It strives to administer the department of Minerals Development to carry out approved programs and make the public aware of the objectives of the department.

==== Special Assistant to Chief Minister for Revenue and Estate ====
The Khyber Pakhtunkhwa Minister of Revenue & Estate is the head of the Khyber Pakhtunkhwa Department of Revenue & Estate, concerned with Revenue & Estate matters. The Minister is a member of the Chief Minister's Cabinet. Mr. Taj Muhammad Tarand has been appointed as Special Assistant to Chief Minister for Revenue & Estate by Chief Minister of KP Mr. Mahmood Khan.

The duties of the minister/Special Assistant/Adviser to Chief Minister revolve around Revenue & Estate conditions and concerns in the Khyber Pakhtunkhwa. This includes advising the Chief Minister on matters of Revenue & Estate. It strives to administer the department of Revenue & Estate to carry out approved programs and make the public aware of the objectives of the department.

==== Minister of Energy & Power ====
The Khyber Pakhtunkhwa Minister of Energy & Power is the head of the Khyber Pakhtunkhwa Department of Energy & Power, concerned with Energy & Power. The Minister is a member of the Chief Minister's Cabinet.

Mr. Muhammad Atif was appointed as Minister of Energy & Power by Chief Minister of KP Pervez Khattak on 1 June 2014. The duties of the minister revolve around Energy & Power conditions and concerns in the Khyber Pakhtunkhwa. This includes advising the Chief Minister on matters of Energy & Power. It strives to administer the department of Energy & Power to carry out approved programs and make the public aware of the objectives of the department.

==== Minister of Law ====
Minister of Law of KP
- Incumbent; Aftab Alam Afridi since 7 March 2024
- Website: Official website

Mr. Imtiaz Shahid was appointed as Minister of Law by Chief Minister of KP Mahmood Khan on 30 August 2018. The duties of the minister revolve around Law conditions and concerns in the Khyber Pakhtunkhwa. This includes advising the Chief Minister on matters of Law. It strives to administer the department of Law to carry out approved programs and make the public aware of the objectives of the department.

==== Minister of Food ====
Minister of Food of KP
- Incumbent; Muhammad Zahir Shah since 7 March 2024
- Department of Food
- Reports to: Chief Minister
- Seat: Peshawar
- Formation: 14 August 1973
- Website: www.food.kp.gov.pk

The Khyber Pakhtunkhwa Minister of Food is the head of the Khyber Pakhtunkhwa Department of Food, concerned with Food. The Minister is a member of the Chief Minister's Cabinet.

Mr. Qalandar Khan was appointed as Minister of Food by Chief Minister of KP Mahmood Khan on 30 August 2018.

The duties of the minister revolve around Food conditions and concerns. This includes advising the Chief Minister on matters of Food. It strives to administer the department of Food to carry out approved programs and make the public aware of the objectives of the department.

=== KP Accountability Commission ===
For the first time ever in the history of any provincial government, the PTI led government of KP presented an amendment in the parliament for the establishment of a provincial Accountability Commission. The bill was passed and KP Ehtesab Cell was set up in 2014. KP government as per its claim kept the Commission away from any political pressure and for the first time in the history of Pakistan, a serving Minister Ziaullah Afridi was arrested for corruption and misuse of Authority by any Law forcing agency. KP Ehtesab Cell claims of recovering as much as 2 billion rupees from the corrupt bureaucrats and politicians. A controversy was created in January 2016 on amending the Accountability Law and Director General Ehtesab Commission resigned on the reservations in amendments. However, the Law was reverted through an ordinance by Chief Minister of KP.

=== Cabinet ===
Party
Pakistan People's Party

=== Cabinet members ===
Khyber Pakhtunkhwa cabinet under Faisal Kundi
Portfolios	Minister	Term
Governor	Faisal Kundi	11 October 2026
Education	Syed Amir Abdullah	11 October 2026
Finance, Revenue, Excise and Taxation	Tariq Mahmood Pasha	11 October 2026
Energy and Power, Planning and Development	Osman Saifullah	11 October 2026
Law and Parliamentary Affairs	Amir Javed	11 October 2026
Information and Broadcasting	Samar Haroon Bilour	11 October 2026
Industries and Commerce	Muhammad Irshad	11 October 2026
Auqaf and Religious Affairs	Tayyab Qureshi	11 October 2026
Health	Nigar Johar	11 October 2026
Home and Tribal Affairs	Kifayatullah Khan	11 October 2026
Mines and Minerals	Sarfaraz Ali Shah	11 October 2026

== Judicial Branch ==
The Judiciary explains and applies the laws. This branch does this by hearing and eventually making decisions on various legal cases.

== Provincial Departments ==
- Department of Administration
- Department of Agriculture
- Department of Auqaf
- Climate Change, Forestry, Environment & Wildlife Department
- Department of Communication & Works
- Department of Elementary & Secondary Education
- Department of Energy & Power
- Department of Environment
- Department of Excise & Taxation
- Department of Finance
- Department of Food
- Department of Health
- Department of Home & Tribal Affairs
- Department of Housing
- Department of Industries
- Department of Information
- Department of Irrigation
- Department of Law
- Department of Local Government
- Department of Minerals Development
- Department of Planning & Development
- Department of Relief, Rehabilitation & Settlement
- Department of Revenue & Estate
- Department of Tourism & Archaeology and Museums
- Department of Sports and Youth Affairs
- Department of Transport
- Department of Zakat & Ushr

== VIP Aircraft ==
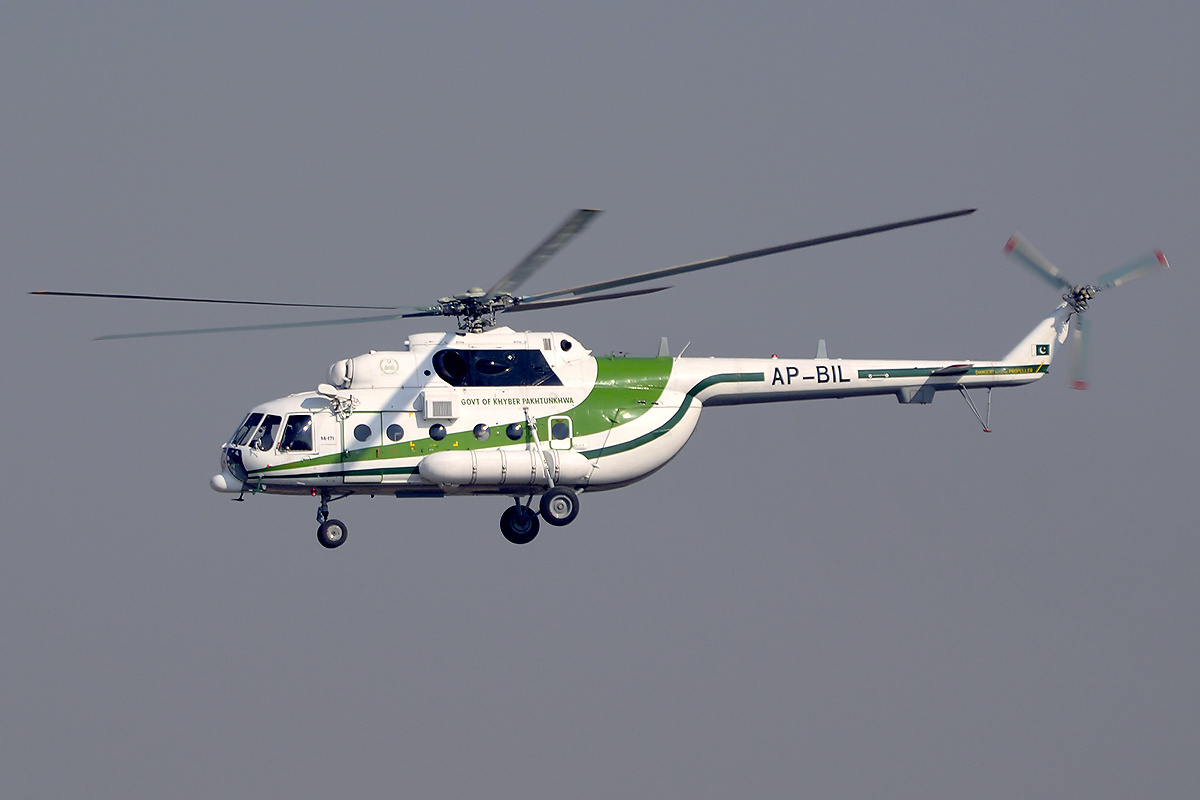
Government of Khyber Pakhtunkhwa former Mi-17 helicopter which crashed in 2025.

The Government of KPK does not operate any fixed-wing aircraft.

=== Current ===
Aircraft	Image	Quantity	Reg.	Note
Eurocopter AS350 Écureuil		1	AP-BIM	

=== Former ===
Aircraft	Image	Quantity	Reg.	Note
Mil Mi-17		1	AP-BIL	Crashed on 15 August 2025 killing 5 occupants.

== See also ==
- Khyber Pakhtunkhwa
- Peshawar, the provincial capital of Khyber Pakhtunkhwa
- Khyber Pakhtunkhwa Assembly
- Sarhad Development Authority
