= Sultan e Rum =

Pakistani politician

Member of the Provincial Assembly of Khyber Pakhtunkhwa
- Incumbent
- Assumed office 29 February 2024
- Preceded by: Muhib Ullah Khan
- Constituency: PK-9 Swat-VII

Personal details
- Born: Swat District, Pakistan
- Party: PTI (2024-present)

Sultan e Rum is a Pakistani politician from Swat District. He is currently serving as a member of the Provincial Assembly of Khyber Pakhtunkhwa since February 2024.

== Career ==
He contested the 2024 general elections as a Pakistan Tehreek-e-Insaf/Independent candidate from PK-9 Swat-VII. He secured 28525 votes. His runner-up was Muhib Ullah Khan of Pakistan Tehreek-e-Insaf Parliamentarians who secured 6913 votes.
