= Aghaz Ikramullah Gandapur =

Pakistani politician

Member of the Provincial Assembly of Khyber Pakhtunkhwa
- In office 22 October 2018 – 18 January 2023
- Constituency: PK-99 (Dera Ismail Khan-V)

Personal details
- Born: November 14, 1992 (age 33)
- Party: JI (2025-present)
- Other political affiliations: JUI (F) (2024-2025); PTI-P (2023-2024); PTI (2018-2023)
- Relations: Inayatullah Khan Gandapur (Grand father); Israr Ullah Khan Gandapur (Uncle)
- Parent: Ikramullah Gandapur (father)

Aghaz Ikramullah Gandapur is a Pakistani politician who was a member of the Provincial Assembly of Khyber Pakhtunkhwa from October 2018 to January 2023. Gandapur is the youngest ever member of the KPK parliament, being of only 25 years at time of his inclusion into Parliament. He has a bachelor's degree in international relations. Gandapur was elected onto PK-99 after the killing of his father in the Kulachi bombings. His family has been in politics for many years - with his grandfather serving as Chief Minister of KPK, his uncle Isarullah serving as law minister, and his father serving as agricultural minister.

== Political career ==
Gandapur was elected to the Provincial Assembly of Khyber Pakhtunkhwa as a candidate of Pakistan Tehreek-e-Insaf (PTI) from the constituency PK-99 in the 2018 Pakistani by-elections held on 14 October 2018. He defeated an independent candidate Fatehullah Khan. Gandapur garnered 30,330 votes while his closest rival secured 22,825 votes.
