= PK-1 Upper Chitral =

Pakistani electoral district

- Constituency for the Khyber Pakhtunkhwa Assembly
- Region: Upper Chitral District
- Electorate: 1,30,139

Current constituency
- Created: 2022
- Seats: 1
- Party: Vacant
- Member: Vacant
- Created from: PK-90 Chitral-II

PK-1 Upper Chitral (پی کے-1، چترال بالا) is a constituency for the Khyber Pakhtunkhwa Assembly of the Khyber Pakhtunkhwa province of Pakistan.It covers area of Upper Chitral District.

== Election 2024 ==
General elections are scheduled to be held on 8 February 2024.

General election 2024: PK-1 Upper Chitral
Party	Candidate	Votes	%	±%
JI	Javed Hussain			
PPP	Siraj Ali Khan			
PML(N)	Muhammad Wazir			
JUI (F)	Shakeel Ahmed			
PTI-P	Ghulam Muhammad			
Independent	Burhan Ud Din			
Independent	Bibi Latifa			
Independent	Hizbullah			
Independent	Rehmat Karim Baig			
Independent	Suriya Bibi			
Independent	Syed Amir Hussain Shah			
Independent	Syed Jamal Shah			
Independent	Gul Murad Khan			
Independent	Mukhtar Nabi			
Independent	Naveed Sultan			
Turnout				
Rejected ballots				
Majority				
Registered electors		1,30,139		
gain from MMA				

== Election 2018 ==
Winner	Party affiliation	Votes
Hidayat ur Rehman	Muttahida Majlis-e-Amal	46050

== Election 2013 ==
Winner	Party affiliation	Votes
Ghulam Muhammad	All Pakistan Muslim League	10848

== See also ==
- PK-115 Dera Ismail Khan-V
- PK-2 Lower Chitral
