= Sarhad Development Authority =

The Sarhad Development Authority is the body which oversees construction and planned developments in the Pakistani province of Khyber Pakhtunkhwa. It was established in 1972 by the Government of Khyber Pakhtunkhwa, with its head office in the capital city of Peshawar. The authority is responsible for:

- Planning, promoting, organising and implementing programmes for the establishment of industries and commercial ventures.
- Tendering advice on the technical, operational and commercial feasibility of any programme or scheme specified by the provincial government.

The SDA was dissolved and merged into the Khyber Pakhtunkhwa Economic Zones Development and Management Company in 2016 by the Government of Khyber Pakhtunkhwa.

== See also ==
- Balochistan Development Authority
