= PK-9 Swat-VII =

Pakistani electoral district

- Constituency for the Khyber Pakhtunkhwa Assembly
- Region: Matta and Kabal Tehsils (partly) of Swat District

Current constituency
- Created from: PK-84 Swat-V (2002-2018); PK-8 Swat-VII (2018-2023)

PK-9 Swat-VII (پی کے-9، سوات-7) is a constituency for the Khyber Pakhtunkhwa Assembly of the Khyber Pakhtunkhwa province of Pakistan. It is currently represented in the Khyber Pakhtunkhwa Assembly by Member of Provincial Assembly, Sultan e Rum.

== See also ==
- PK-8 Swat-VI
- PK-10 Swat-VIII
