= Muhammad Sajjad =

Pakistani politician

Provincial Minister of Agriculture for Khyber Pakhtunkhwa
- In office 7 March 2024 – 13 October 2025

Member of the Provincial Assembly of Khyber Pakhtunkhwa
- Incumbent
- Assumed office 29 February 2024
- Constituency: PK-98 Karak-II

Personal details
- Born: Karak District, Khyber Pakhtunkhwa, Pakistan
- Party: PTI (2024-present)

Muhammad Sajjad also known as Sajjad Barakwal is a Pakistani politician from Karak District. He served as Provincial Minister of Agriculture for Khyber Pakhtunkhwa (KPK) in the Gandapur ministry and is a member of the Provincial Assembly of Khyber Pakhtunkhwa from the Pakistan Tehreek-e-Insaf (PTI) since February 2024.

== Political career ==
He contested the 2024 Khyber Pakhtunkhwa provincial election as a Pakistan Tehreek-e-Insaf-backed Independent candidate from PK-98 Karak-II. He secured 37,284 votes and won the seat. Following this, he was inducted into the PTI provincial cabinet of Chief Minister Ali Amin Gandapur as Minister for Agriculture.

As Minister, Sajjad stated that agriculture was the backbone of the economy and that since Khyber Pakhtunkhwa’s land was fertile, he and the government would put special attention and effort into boosting the agriculture sector and making it self-sufficient. He also directed officials in the Agriculture Department to plant more fruit orchards to more areas of the province while he visited the Directorate General of Agriculture Research in Peshawar. He has also continuously emphasized the Gandapur ministry’s commitment to agricultural research.
