= Agricultural Training Institute (Peshawar) =

Agricultural school in Peshawar, Pakistan

Agricultural Training Institute زرعى تربيتى ادارہ پېښور
- Established: 1922
- Focus: Agricultural
- Owner: Khyber Pakhtunkhwa Department of Agriculture
- Location: Peshawar, Khyber Pakhtunkhwa, Pakistan
- Website: ati.kp.gov.pk

Agricultural Training Institute (ATI; Pashto: زرعى تربيتى ادارہ پېښور) was established in 1922 in Peshawar, Khyber Pakhtunkhwa, Pakistan. The ATI is working under the Khyber Pakhtunkhwa Department of Agriculture.

== History ==
The current building of ATI was constructed in 1922 as normal training college (Vocational Training) by Education Department which was temporarily loaned to University of Peshawar.

== Programs ==
- Agricultural Sciences (Dip-3 years)
- Veterinary Assistant (Dip-3 years)

== Attack ==
On 1 December 2017, 3–4 gunmen of Tehreek-e-Taliban attacked ATI as a result of which at least 13 people were killed and 35+ were injured.

== See also ==
- Khyber Pakhtunkhwa Department of Agriculture
- Agricultural University Peshawar
