= Damaan Valley =

Valley in Khyber-Pakhtunkhwa province

Damaan Valley is a valley of Dera Ismail Khan District in Khyber Pakhtunkhwa province of Pakistan. It is situated 55 km from Dera Ismail Khan. Sherani mountain range is in the west and Sulaiman Range in the south-west. Pezu mountains Sheikh Budin range mark its boundary on the northeast side. River Indus bounds Damaan from the east and Dera Ghazi Khan District Punjab lies on its south side.

== See also ==
- Kulachi
- Dera Ismail Khan
- Gomal River
