= Ishtiaq Ibrahim =

Chief Justice of the Peshawar High Court
- In office 20 April 2024 – 13 February 2025
- Preceded by: Muhammad Ibrahim Khan

Justice of the Peshawar High Court
- In office 12 August 2016 – 14 February 2025

Personal details
- Born: 2 December 1969 (age 56) Khazana village in Peshawar District

Ishtiaq Ibrahim (born 2 December 1969) is a Pakistani jurist and a former chief justice of the Peshawar High Court. Since 14 February 2025, he has been serving as a judge of the Supreme Court of Pakistan.

== Biography ==
Ibrahim was born on 2 December 1969 in Khazana village in Peshawar District.

He completed his early education at University Public School, Peshawar in 1985 and pursued his secondary education at Government College Peshawar in 1987. Following this, he attended Government College Peshawar for his Bachelor of Arts degree. Later, he obtained his LLB from Khyber Law College in 1989 and 1992, respectively.

Ibrahim began his legal career by becoming an advocate of the District Courts on 18 May 1993, and advocate of the High Courts on 11 March 1995. He was appointed as a National Accountability Bureau (NAB) special prosecutor from 2001 to 2002.

Later, he was enrolled as an Advocate of the Supreme Court of Pakistan on 26 September 2008.

His involvement in legal associations includes serving as Joint Secretary and later as General Secretary of the Peshawar High Court Bar Association from 1998 to 1999, and from 2007 to 2008, respectively. He also served as President of the Peshawar High Court Bar Association from 2013 to 2014.

He was appointed as an additional Justice of the Peshawar High Court on 12 August 2016. On 1 June 2018, he took oath as the permanent judge of the PHC.

On 13 April 2024, he was appointed as acting Chief Justice of the Peshawar High Court. He took oath as Chief Justice on 20 April 2024.
