= Inayatullah Khan Gandapur =

Pakistani politician (1919–2005)

Inayatullah Khan Gandapur Minister
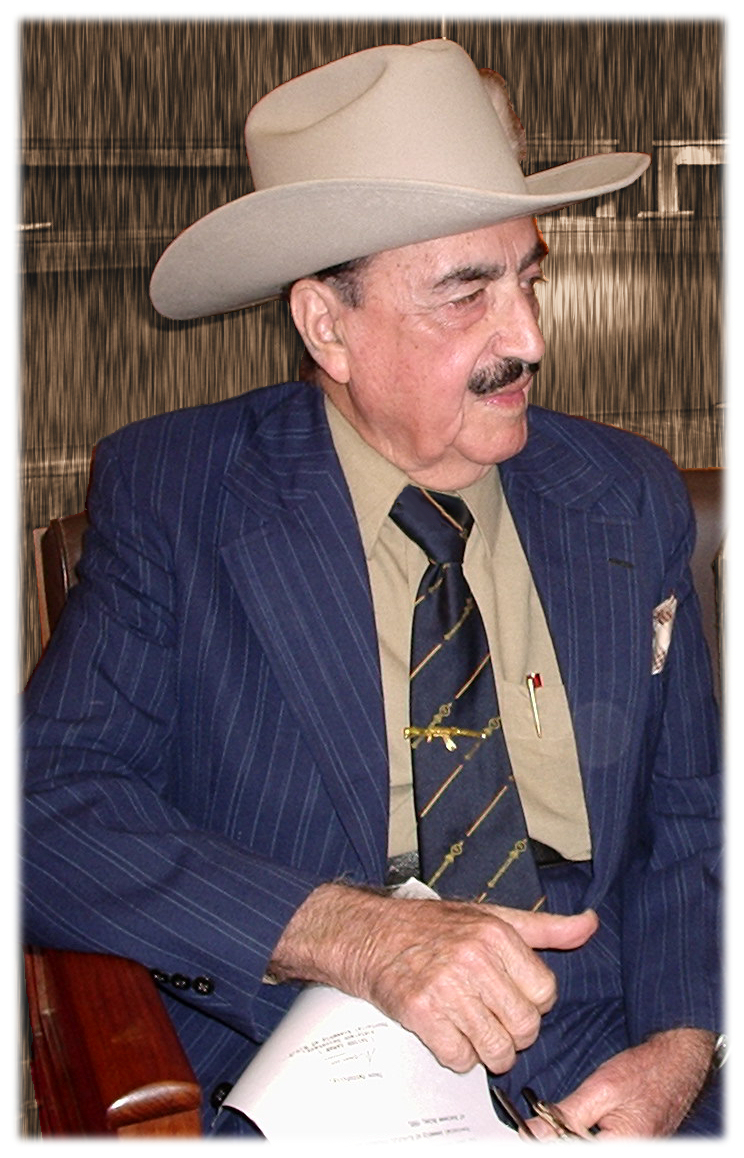
- Inayatullah in 2005

Chief Minister of the North-West Frontier Province
- In office 29 April 1973 – 16 February 1975
- Preceded by: Mufti Mahmud
- Succeeded by: Nasrullah Khan Khattak

Minister for Finance and Statistics
- In office 1972–1973

Personal details
- Born: 27 August 1919 Kulachi, Dera Ismail Khan District
- Died: 29 April 2005 (aged 85) Kulachi, Dera Ismail Khan District
- Party: Jamiat Ulema-e Islam (F); Pakistan Peoples Party
- Children: Israr Ullah Khan Gandapur; Sardar Ikramullah Gandapur; Sardar Inam Ullah Khan
- Parent: Sardar Asad Ullah Jan Khan (father)
- Occupation: Politician

Sardar Inayatullah Khan Gandapur (Urdu: سردار عنایت اللہ خان گنڈا پور; 27 August 1919 – 29 April 2005) was a Pakistani politician from the Khyber-Pakhtunkhwa province of Pakistan. He was born on August 27, 1919, in Kulachi Tehsil of Dera Ismail Khan District. Elected to the provincial assembly in the 1970 elections, he served as finance minister from 1972 to 1973 under the coalition government of Mufti Mehmood. After the resignation of the provincial government in 1973, he defected to the Pakistan Peoples Party. He was the Chief Minister of the province from 29 April 1973 to 16 February 1975. He was dismissed as Chief Minister unceremoniously following the assassination of Hayat Sherpao.

He died on 29 April 2005, leaving three sons, Sardar Ikramullah Gandapur a politician, Sardar Inam Ullah Khan (Director of Federal Investigation Agency Islamabad), and Sardar Israr Ullah Khan Gandapur. Sardar Israr Ullah Khan Gandapur (1975-2013) was assassinated on 16 October 2013 on Eid-day when greeting public in his house. Sardar Israr Ullah Khan, including 10 others died due to this blast. He was buried on 17 October in Dera Ismail Khan. Sardar Ikramullah Gandapur (1964-2018) was killed in a suicide attack on 22 July 2018 while heading to a political convention.

Political offices
Preceded by Mufti Mahmud	Chief Ministers of the Khyber-Pakhtunkhwa; 1973–1975	Succeeded by Nasrullah Khan Khattak
