= Incumbent Cabinet of Khyber Pakhtunkhwa =

Executive authority of Khyber Pakhtunkhwa, Pakistan

Cabinet of Khyber Pakhtunkhwa
- کابینہ خیبر پختونخوا د خیبر پښتونخوا کابینه

- Provincial Emblem of Khyber Pakhtunkhwa

Agency overview
- Formed: 23 August 1947; 79 years ago
- Type: Highest executive body of the provincial government
- Jurisdiction: Government of Khyber Pakhtunkhwa
- Headquarters: Peshawar
- Agency executive: Faisal Kundi, Chairperson
- Child agency: Ministries of the Government of Khyber Pakhtunkhwa
- Website: kp.gov.pk

The Cabinet of Khyber Pakhtunkhwa is the principal executive organ of the Government of the Pakistani province of Khyber Pakhtunkhwa. It is composed of senior government officials chosen and led by the Chief Minister of Khyber Pakhtunkhwa. All cabinet members sworn in are designated Minister, and are seated in Peshawar, the provincial capital. The incumbent cabinet is the Kundi provincial government after governor's rule was imposed on 11 October 2026.

According to the Constitution of Pakistan, the Chief Minister may dismiss members of the cabinet, but must do so in writing, and new appointees must again be approved by the Provincial Assembly of Khyber Pakhtunkhwa. The cabinet prior to the current one was the Gandapur Ministry.

== Current Cabinet (2026-present) ==
Party
| Pakistan People's Party |

=== Cabinet members ===
Khyber Pakhtunkhwa cabinet under Faisal Kundi
| Portfolios | Minister | Term |
|---|---|---|
| Governor | Faisal Kundi | 11 October 2026 |
| Education | Syed Amir Abdullah | 11 October 2026 |
| Finance, Revenue, Excise and Taxation | Tariq Mahmood Pasha | 11 October 2026 |
| Energy and Power, Planning and Development | Osman Saifullah | 11 October 2026 |
| Law and Parliamentary Affairs | Amir Javed | 11 October 2026 |
| Information and Broadcasting | Samar Haroon Bilour | 11 October 2026 |
| Industries and Commerce | Muhammad Irshad | 11 October 2026 |
| Auqaf and Religious Affairs | Tayyab Qureshi | 11 October 2026 |
| Health | Nigar Johar | 11 October 2026 |
| Home and Tribal Affairs | Kifayatullah Khan | 11 October 2026 |
| Mines and Minerals | Sarfaraz Ali Shah | 11 October 2026 |

== List of Cabinets ==
- Akram Khan Durrani cabinet (2002 to 2007)
- Haider Khan Hoti cabinet (2008 to 2013)
- Pervez Khattak cabinet (2013 to 2018)
- Mahmood Khan cabinet (2018 to 2023)
- Ali Amin Gandapur cabinet (2024 to 2025)
- Sohail Afridi cabinet (2025 to 2026)
- Faisal Kundi cabinet (2026 to present)
