= Ikramullah Gandapur =

Pakistani politician

Sardar Ikramullah Khan Gandapur Minister

Minister for Agriculture
- In office 7 May 2014 – 28 May 2018
- Constituency: PK-67 D.I. Khan-IV

Personal details
- Born: 11 February 1962 Dera Ismail Khan, Pakistan
- Died: 22 July 2018 (aged 56) Dera Ismail Khan, Pakistan
- Manner of death: Assassination by suicide attack
- Party: Pakistan Tehreek-e-Insaf (PTI)
- Children: Aghaz Ikramullah Gandapur (son)
- Parent: Inayatullah Khan Gandapur (father)
- Relatives: Israr Ullah Khan Gandapur (brother)
- Occupation: Politician

Sardar Ikramullah Gandapur (Urdu: سردار اکرام اللہ گنڈا پور; 11 February 1962 – 22 July 2018) was a Pakistani politician, and a member of Pakistan Tehreek-e-Insaf who served as provisional Minister for Agriculture in the Khyber Pakhtunkhwa Assembly. He was elected to his late brother, Israr Ullah Khan Gandapur, ex law minister's seat through a by-election.

== Life ==
Gandapur hailed from the village of Kulachi and was the eldest son of Inayatullah Khan Gandapur, and at an early age was asked to perform various political tasks on behalf of his father, during his father's political career. He was an important decision maker in the surrounding areas of Kulachi and due to his efforts, the constituency PK-99 was formed, giving Kulachi and its surrounding areas a better say in parliament. He also played a pivotal role in improving Kulachi's infrastructure and providing a higher grid of electricity which helped the local people to avail a steady flow of electricity.

After his brother's death, Gandapur was elected through a by-election and served as provisional Minister of Agriculture. He played a leading role in implementing the government's decision of planting a million trees across the province. Other achievements by him as Minister for Agriculture were; 1) helped many small holding farmers of the province by providing free seeds which helped them enhance their production manifold. 2) ensured providing watercourses (lakhti in Pashto) which guaranteed minimal water wastage and high crop production. 3) leveling of the land of farmers so as to facilitate sowing and harvesting of crops. 4) played a leading role in the commissioning of Gomal Zam, which resulted in more water for the farmers of the area, which enhanced the value of their land and enabling them to grow sugar cane, which requires high quantity of water.

== Death ==
Gandapur died from injuries sustained after the Kulachi suicide bombing in Dera Ismail Khan. His death was widely condemned across Pakistan.
