= PK-115 Dera Ismail Khan-V =

Pakistani electoral district

- Constituency for the Khyber Pakhtunkhwa Assembly
- Region: Kulachi Tehsil, Daraban Tehsil FR Region D.I Khan of Dera Ismail Khan District

Current constituency
- Member(s): Sardar Ikramullah Gandapur
- Created from: PK-67 Dera Ismail Khan-IV (2002–2018); PK-99 Dera Ismail Khan-V (2018–2023)

PK-115 Dera Ismail Khan-V (پی کے-115، ڈیرہ اسماعیل خان-5) is a constituency for the Khyber Pakhtunkhwa Assembly of the Khyber Pakhtunkhwa province of Pakistan. It comprises Kulachi Tehsil, Draban Tehsil and FR Region Dera Ismail Khan.

== See also ==
- PK-114 Dera Ismail Khan-IV
- PK-1 Upper Chitral
