= Kulachi =

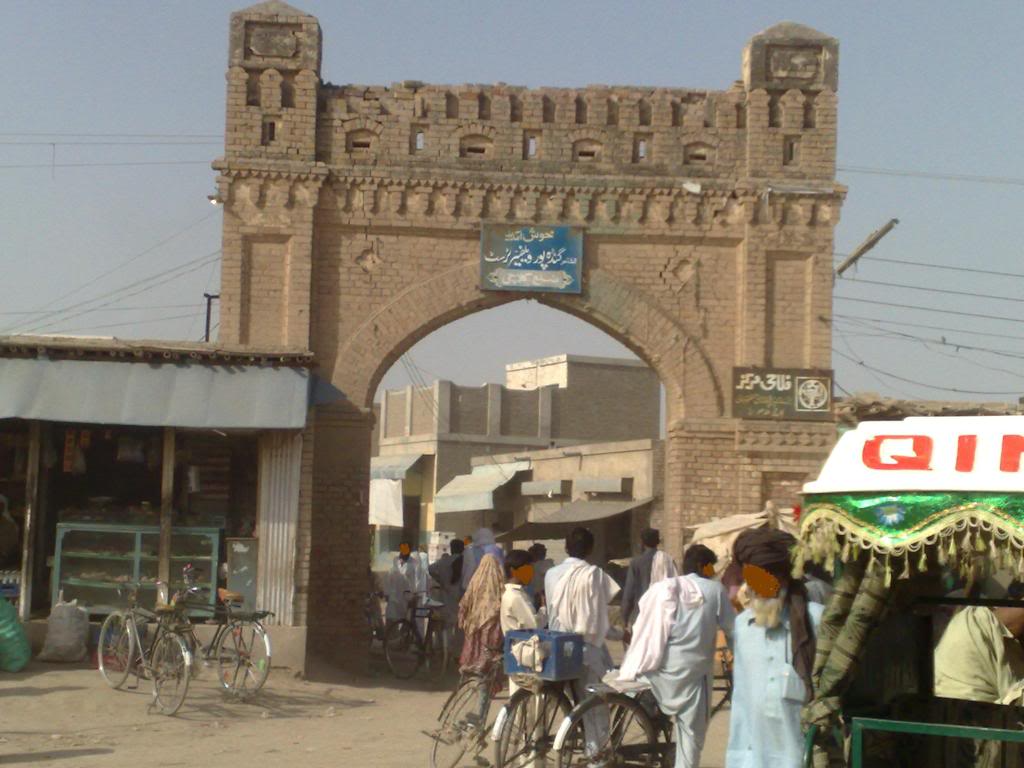
- Shakhi gate, one the six gates located at the periphery of Kulachi

- Location within Khyber Pakhtunkhwa Location within Pakistan Location within Asia
- Coordinates: 31.55°N 70.27°E
- Country: Pakistan
- Province: Khyber-Pakhtunkhwa
- Elevation: 209 m (686 ft)

Population (2023)
  - Total: 24,481
- Time zone: UTC+5 (PST)
- Calling code: 0966
- Number of Towns: 2
- Number of Union councils: 15

Kulachi (کلاچی) is a town in Khyber-Pakhtunkhwa province of Pakistan. It is located at 31°55′49″N 70°27′31″E at an altitude of 209 metres (688 feet).

== Economy ==
Kulachi is an agricultural city. The area lies at the foot of the Sulaiman Range and hence is irrigated by flood water from Sulaiman Mountains. The system of irrigation is called Rod Kohi, a system of mountain channels or hill-torrents inundating the whole valley of Damaan ("Rod" means "channel" and "Koh" means "mountain" in Persian). The Rod Kohi system based on "Kulyat Riwajat" (Fromulae and Traditions) governed the irrigation system ever since the Pathan tribes had moved into Damaan. The British officers reduced all these to writing during their Land Settlemts in the later part of 19th century. The Bolton Irrigation Notes of 1908 are still considered as the Bible of Rod Kohi irrigation. The city population consists of two major ethnic groups, the Pushtuns and the Baloch who mostly speak Saraiki.

== Demographics ==
=== Population ===
Historical population
Year	Pop.	±% p.a.
1951	6,981	—
1961	7,190	+0.30%
1972	9,315	+2.38%
1981	14,785	+5.27%
1998	19,113	+1.52%
2017	24,753	+1.37%
2023	24,481	−0.18%

As of the 2023 census, Kulachi had a population of 24,481.

== Demographics ==
According to the 2017 census, the population of Kulachi Tehsil is 101,892 whereas the population of Kulachi city is 24,753.
