= Miana (Pashtun tribe) =

Pashtun tribe

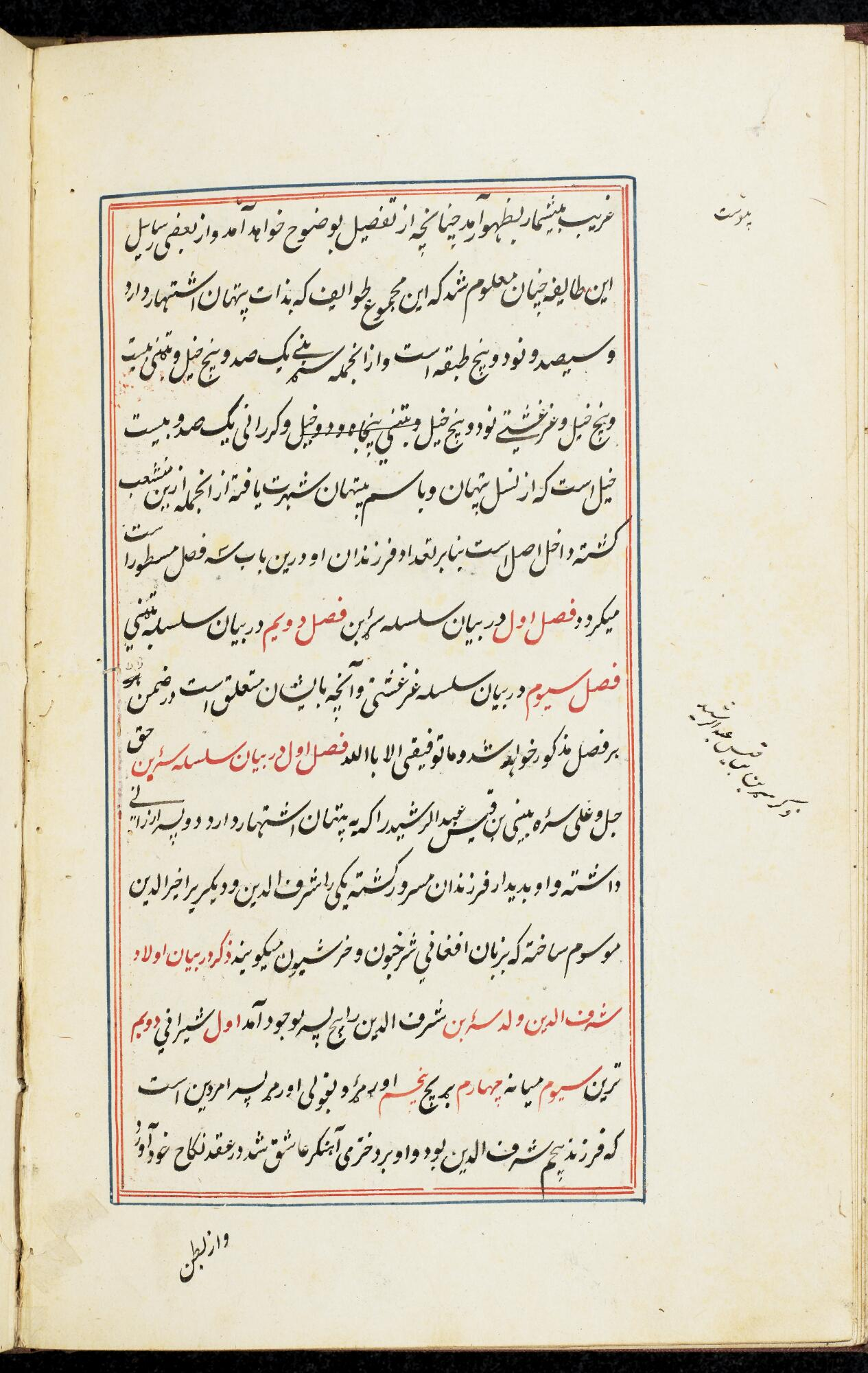
Folio 33b of the Makhzan-i Afghānī (c. 1612), detailing the subdivisions of the Afghans of the Sharkhbun branch. Copied by Shaykh Niẓām al-Dīn Nawkar Ṣāḥib in 1796. Held at the John Rylands Library (Persian MS 155)

The Miyana or Miyanai (Pashto: میانه, also romanized as Miyāṇah or Miyanrah), are a Pashtun tribe belonging to the Sarban division, specifically within the Sharkhbun branch. Historically documented in the Makhzan-i-Afghani (translated into English as the History of the Afghans) by Khwaja Naimatullah al-Harawi, they are genealogically categorized as siblings to the Shirani, Barech, and Tareen tribes. They primarily inhabit territories in Northern Balochistan today, within the Loralai, MusaKhel, and Dukki districts. Some are settled in the Quetta district, within the vicinity of the Sulaiman Mountain ranges. Smaller, fragmented populations are located across the wider Pashtun belt, and some have settled in Punjab's Dera Ghazi Khan district near the northeastern edge of Balochistan.

== Tribal branches ==
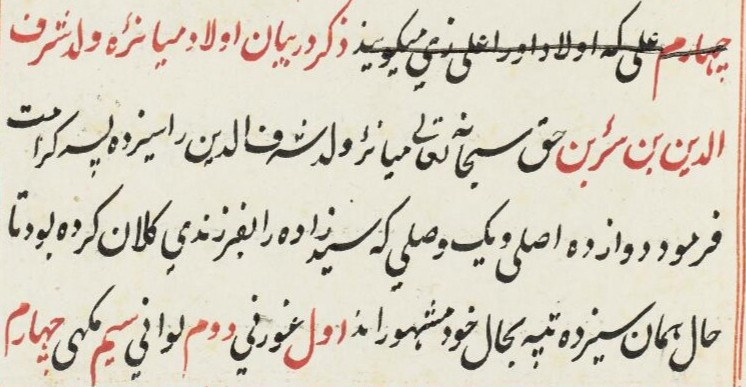
A cropped section from a page of the Makhzan-i Afghani detailing the names of the first three sons of Miyana. - John Rylands Library Persian MS 155 - Folio 37a

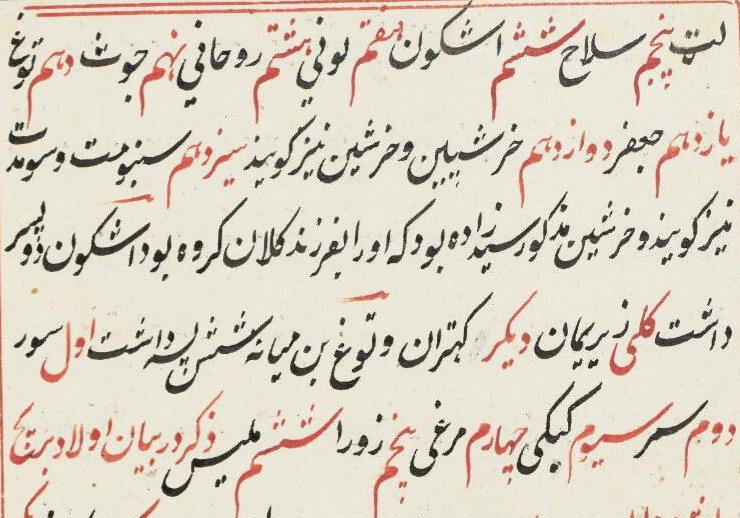
A cropped section from a page of the Makhzan-i Afghani detailing the names of the remaining sons of Miyana - John Rylands Library Persian MS 155 - Folio 37b

According to the Makhzan-i-Afghani, compiled c. 1612 by Naimatullah, the principal sub-sections of the Miyana lineage include:

- Loni (Lorni)
- Rahwani
- Ghornai (Ghorai)
- Tsot
- Lawani
- Las
- Mullai
- Jafar
- Gharsheen (or Kharshin)
- Shkorn (Zmarai and Kahtran)
- Silah
- Togh

== Demographics and assimilation ==
Today majority of these branches are primarily found along the Sulaiman Mountains. Over centuries, complex regional dynamics have led to the assimilation of several Miyana sections into other Pashtun tribes and neighboring ethnic groups. For example, descendants of the Togh branch are largely found in the Bangash region, with a village in the region bearing their name. Muhammad Hayat Khan also mentions some groups in Kandahar.

While many branches such as the Luni and Zamarai speak Pashto predominantly, linguistic shifts and regional bilingualism are also heavily prevalent among these descendants. The Jafar and Rahwani branches in the Drug and Gargoji areas of MusaKhel maintain their Pashtun identity, however according to the census of India (1911), they predominantly speak Jafriki (a language very similar to Khetrani) or remain bilingual. In contrast, Jafar communities residing further west in the Pashtun belt, such as in Quetta, Loralai, and Dukki, have largely retained the Pashto language.

The 1911 census of Balochistan records that sub-sections like the Silah merged with the Khetran, while others integrated into the Isots residing north of the Drug valley. Other branches experienced similar structural shifts; many Gharsheen frequently identify solely as Syed and the 1907 Loralai district gazetteer also describes those inhabiting MusaKhel as speaking Jafriki or Khetrani. Muhammad Hayat Khan noted in the Hayat-i-Afghani that Gharsheen communities exist across the wider Pashtun belt in areas in the vicinity of Kandahar.

== History and migrations ==
=== Early homeland ===
The traditional homeland of the Miyana was centered in the Sulaiman Mountains. According to Hafiz Rahmat Khan Barech’s Khulasat ul-Ansab (1770), the tribe inhabited the regions near Takht-e-Sulaiman, which he explicitly refers to as Kasighar. Kasighar is the Pashto equivalent for Takht-e-Sulaiman (the site where the mythical progenitor of the Pashtuns, Qais Abdur Rasheed, is traditionally said to be buried). Hafiz Rahmat Khan describes them as sharing contiguous territory east of the Sheranis. H.A. Rose, in A Glossary of the Tribes and Castes... (1911), also states that the Miyana inhabited Kasighar in the past, establishing that prior to their later migrations, the Miyana historical center lay near the modern-day Sherani District and south of Dera Ismail Khan.

=== The Lodhi Era and Early Migrations ===
Afghan migration into the Indian subcontinent occurred in successive waves, significantly accelerated by the Mongol conquests of Afghanistan and the establishment of the Delhi Sultanate. Displaced by regional upheaval and in search of new livelihoods and opportunities, populations from Roh—a vast historical region stretching from Kashkar in the north to Balochistan in the south, and the Helmand River in the west to Kashmir in the east—began migrating eastward. This included tribes such as the Miyana, Shirani, Yusufzai, Barozai, Panni, and Dilazak. Genealogical records of the Nawabs of Savanur also trace their ancestry to Malik Abdul Karim Khan Miyana, who served the Delhi Sultanate before the Mughal era and was granted an estate near Delhi prior to the Mughal period.

Following the call of Bahlul Lodi, many Miyana migrated to assist in the expansion of the Lodi dynasty, incentivized by high-ranking positions and land grants. Rizqullah Mushtaqi mentions that when Prince Nizam Khan Lodi (Sultan Sikandar Lodi) was sent by Sultan Bahlol Lodi to crush the rebellion instigated by Tatar Khan Yusufkhel, and began gathering a coalition of commanders and their sawars to join the Prince's army, Ikhtiyar Khan Togh (Miyana) was one of the commanders who presented himself for service, eventually culminating in a battle between Nizam Khan and Tatar Khan's armies on the plains of Ambala.

=== The Sur Period ===
According to K.R. Qanungo the Miyana migrated as mercenaries for the Khalji rulers of Malwa, establishing a presence there in the 16th century. Many individuals of this tribe naviagted the complex and shifting political landscape of North India. While Nizam Khan Miyana surrendered to the Mughal Emperor Babur, others, such as Sikandar Khan Miyana of Malwa, attempted to maintain their independence amid the ensuing power struggles between the early Mughals and the Afghan factions. As Sher Shah Suri consolidated his empire, this neutrality eventually brought Sikandar Khan into direct conflict with him.

Modern historians and some early chronicles, offer differing perspectives on Sher Shah Suri's march on Malwa. According to Abbas Khan Sarwani’s Tarikh-i-Sher Shahi, the campaign was an expedition driven by Sher Shah's grievance against regional rulers of Malwa. This included Sikandar Khan Miyana, the independent ruler of Satwans and Hadiyat, who had previously refused to aid Sher Shah's son, Prince Qutub Khan, against Mughal forces, resulting in the Prince's death. However, modern historians such as K.R. Qanungo suggest this grievance primarily served as a strategic pretext for annexation.

When Sher Shah encamped at Ujjain, Sikandar Khan Miyana presented and formally submitted. Following the flight of Malwa's ruler, Mallu Khan (Qadir Shah), Sarwani's account claims that Sher Shah, infuriated by Mallu Khan's escape, stripped his commander Shujaat Khan of the Malwa governorship, and handed him Sikandar's confiscated territories of Satwans and Hadiyat. Qanungo refutes this, stating that Shujaat Khan had never been appointed to the governorship or the faujdari of Ujjain at that stage of the campaign.

Qanungo notes that as Sher Shah marched from Malwa toward Ranthambore, he brought Sikandar along with him. During the march, Sikandar grew restive at the prospect of detention outside of his local power base. Suspecting his loyalty, Sher Shah promptly imprisoned him and officially confiscated his jagirs. In response to this capture, his brother, Nasir Khan Miyana, launched a retaliation against Shujaat Khan. Nasir Khan attacked with 6,000 horsemen, instructing his men to capture Shujaat Khan alive to use as leverage for his brother's release. The plan failed, and Nasir Khan was forced to flee, leaving 200 elephants in the hands of Shujaat Khan.

Sikandar's ultimate fate remains contested in the historical record. Iqbal Hussain notes that he survived this imprisonment and continued to serve as nobility into the subsequent reign of Islam Shah Suri. Conversely, Khwaja Naimatullah's Makhzan-i-Afghani states that his life ended in assassination at the instigation of the Timurid Mirzas. Resolving this contradiction, Qanungo notes that "Mirza" in the translated text is evidently a slip for "Miyana," indicating that he may have actually been assassinated by rival kinsmen within his own tribe.

Another noble, Alem Khan Miyana, revolted against Sher Shah in the province of Maitra (Pargana Meerath) but was later taken prisoner. In the 1545 succession clash following Sher Shah's death, at Agra, an Alem Khan Miyana—though it is uncertain if this was the same individual—along with nobles like Par Khan Lohani and Burmazid Gour, defected to the rebel forces, from Islam Shah Suri's army, led by Adil Khan Suri and Khawaz Khan Marwat the night before the battle. As Islam Shah Suri’s lines held and the rebels collapsed the next day, Alem Khan opportunistically abandoned the losing side and attempted to seamlessly rejoin the victorious royal army to save himself. However, Sultan Islam Shah saw through his treachery and ordered his immediate execution.

It must be noted that many Miyana remained loyal to the Sur state. Sher Shah Suri appointed Sadr Khan Miyana (belonging to the Gharsheen section) as the faujdar of Malwa. It was likely during the Sur period that many Miyana, alongside Karlani and Dilazak Afghans, began to seek employment as mercenaries and administrators in the Deccan Sultanates.

=== The Mughal Era ===
Miyana activity in Central India continued into the Mughal era. Abul Fazl records in the Ain-i-Akbari (Volume II) that in the third year of Akbar's reign (c. 1558), the Miyana Afghans rose in rebellion near Sironj in Malwa. The Emperor dispatched Kamal Khan Gakkhar to suppress the revolt and bring the region under control. The translation of the Akbarnama (Volume II) mentions Asaf Khan securing "Miyana wilayat" before invading Garha-Katanga. Historical context and translator Henry Beveridge's assessment suggest this meant "the Country of the Miyana Afghans." By the reigns of Akbar and Shah Jahan, it also appears that a substantial demographic shift had occurred. The Ain-i-Akbari also records that 1,500 infantry and 50 cavalry were to be provided by Utraula in Gorakhpur, where the main caste inhabiting the territory is stated to be the "Afghan-i-Miyanah."

During the reign of the Mughal Emperor Shah Jahan, prominent Afghan leaders aligned with the rebellious Khan Jahan Lodi in Malwa around 1629. Among them was Bahlol Khan Miyana (Sarbuland Khan), son of Hasan Khan Miyana, who held a mansab (military rank) of 1,500 under the Mughal Emperor Jahangir and was elevated to a commander of 4,000 and jagirdar of Balapur by Shah Jahan.

As Khan Jahan Lodi's rebellion faltered, he grew despondent over the impending ruin of his followers. The Dhakhīrat al-khawānīn, authored by Sheikh Farid Bhakkri, records a sharp ideological split between the Afghan nobility at this juncture. Recognizing the fatal consequences of his rebellion, Khan Jahan Lodi reportedly stated:

"The Mughals would expel and kill each and every Afghan from the towns and villages. Even the Afghan maid-servants would stand and strike their slipper upon the earth, proclaiming that ‘it is on Khan Jahan’s head that on account of his shame our condition has fallen thus.’ I haven’t the strength to bear their cries and wails after my death."

Disillusioned by Khan Jahan’s despair and the abandonment of their cause, Bahlol Khan Miyana severed his allegiance, stating:

"We abandoned our homelands and imperial service and joined you in the hope that we would attain the rank of 12,000 under your kingship. And now, having thus ruined men’s households, you have thrown away your shield. What has befallen us that we should be killed alongside you?"

Following this fracture, Bahlol Khan defected, turning his attention south toward the Deccan and entering the service of the Adil Shahi Sultanate of Bijapur. Khan Jahan Lodi was later captured by the Mughals and executed in January 1631 CE.

=== The Deccan and the Savanur State ===
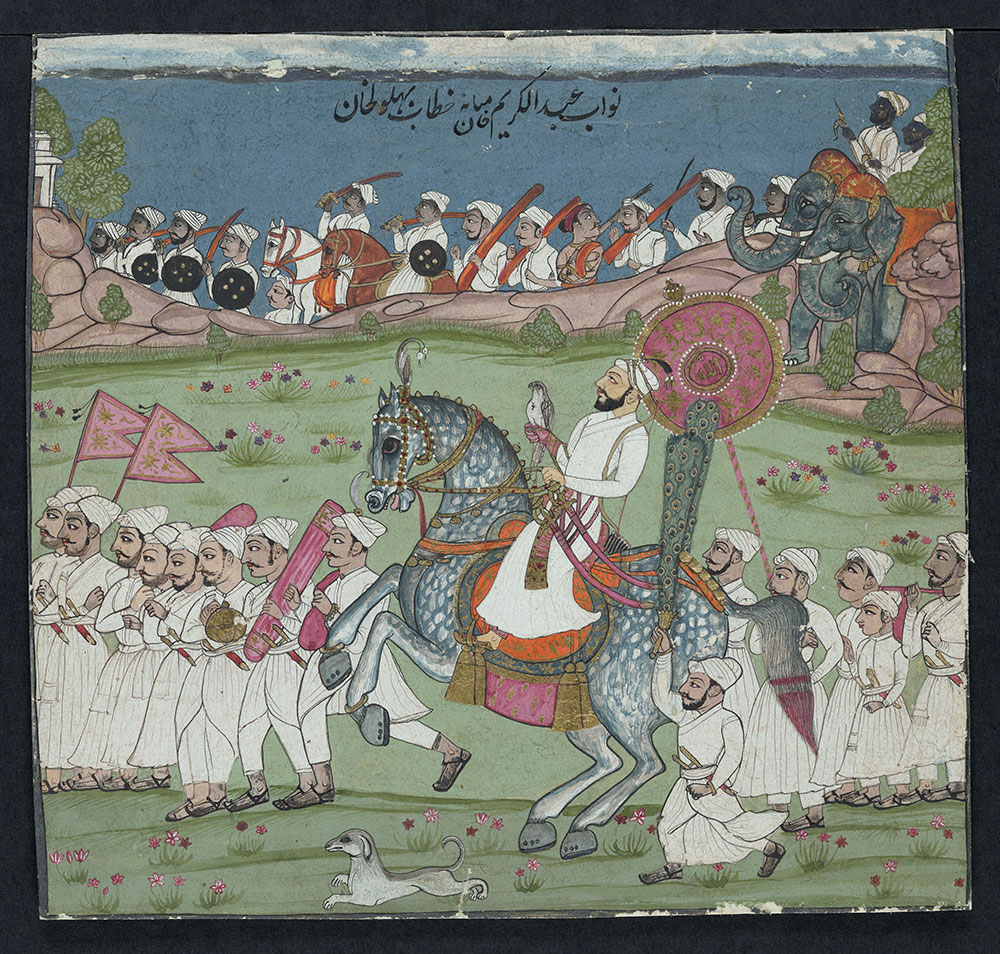
Painting of Abdul Karim Khan Miyana of Bijapur hunting on Horseback, with Elephants and Calvary.

Bahlol Khan’s descendants rose to significant prominence in the Deccan. His grandson, Abdul Karim Khan Miyana, became one of the most powerful figures in Bijapur, serving as Commander-in-Chief of the Adil Shahi army and later as Regent for Sultan Sikandar Adil Shah. He also suppressed local revolts for Sikandar Adil Shah, for which he was granted a substantial jagir. Abdul Karim emerged as a formidable opponent to Mughal expansion, engaging their forces in battle numerous times. On one notable occasion, Abdul Karim led the Bijapur forces against a Mughal army commanded by his own first cousin, Ikhlas Khan Miyana. This encounter highlights a characteristic of the Deccan wars, wherein Afghan elites and soldiers frequently formed the backbone of opposing armies.

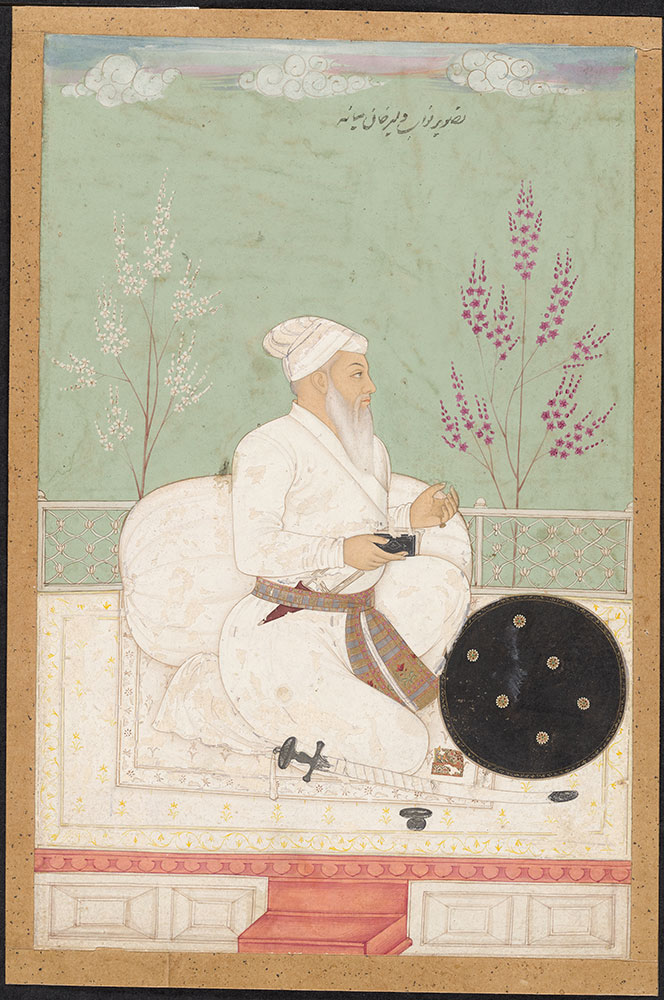
Portrait of Nawab Adul Rauf Khan Miyana - Dilir Khan.

The lineage peaked under Abdul Rauf Khan Miyana, son of Abdul Karim, who navigated the Mughal conquest of Bijapur. In 1680, he negotiated the surrender of the Adil Shahi state to Emperor Aurangzeb. Earning the Emperor’s favor, Abdul Rauf joined the Mughal forces in 1681 with 6,000 troops (largely from his own tribe) and was awarded the title Dalel Khan Bahadur Diler Jang, the jagir of Bankapur, and a mansab of 7,000 for his service. This laid the foundation for the Savanur State, which reached its zenith under his son, Abdul Majid, between 1722 and 1755. The Nawabs of Savanur remained a formidable power. They would later clash with Haider Ali and his son Tipu Sultan of Mysore, and ruled as a princely state until absorption into the Republic of India in 1947.

=== The Miyana of Koh-i-Suleiman ===
The en masse migration of skilled fighters and powerful aristocratic families into India deeply fractured the remaining Miyana demographic in the Sulaiman Mountains. Left numerically and militarily depleted, the remaining sub-sections were highly vulnerable to territorial encroachment.

British ethnographer Major H.G. Raverty documented the geographic drift of the remaining branches south of their original territories near Kasighar. Oral traditions and administrative records indicate that many remnants of the Miyana consolidated southeast in the vicinity of the Drug valley, located in modern day MusaKhel district of Balochistan. The 1911 Census of India explicitly mentions that Surani, Somat, and Rahwani subsections—all once classified as distinct Miyana branches—were now operating as merging sections within the Jafar tribal structure, highlighting this internal tribal merging and collective migration.

Despite this consolidation, the Miyana remnants were largely unable to defend their historical territories against expanding Baloch tribes such as the Buzdar and Gorchani, as well as rival or other Pashtun groups. Major Raverty notes the severe toll these encroachments took on the Jafar and other Miyana remnants. The village of Gargoji was originally held by Gharsheen Syeds before other demographic groups moved in. Raverty details that the Gharsheen were ultimately forced out of Gargoji and surrounding areas because the Jafar and Luni lacked the capacity to protect them from Buzdar raids and depredations.

Consequently, the Gharsheen migrated out of the area and sought protection among the Ustranas. Many also migrated to Punjab, inhabiting a village of their name located in the vicinity of the road from Attock to Rawalpindi, and some to Taunsa.

The Luni, who once occupied areas in the vicinity of the Drug valley, according to a report compiled by Major O.T Dukes, similarly migrated south, founding the village of Kot Muhammad Khan at the base of the Hazargat peak, southwest of the Drug valley, and later migrated towards Dukki. In Duke's report, they are also noted as having migrated near Vehowa—situated on the border between modern-day MusaKhel and Dera Ghazi Khan—prior to Drug. The predominant ethnic group in this area is the Khetran. Major R.T.I. Ridgway notes that the Khetran migrated to Vehowa from their territories originally near Dera Ismail Khan after their tribe was broken up by the Emperor Akbar.

A major conflict occurred against the Gorchani. In a battle near Nath, the Gorchani reportedly killed between 80 and 100 Jafar defenders, dealing a critical blow to the Pashtun population of Drug. Further displacement from the region was only prevented through the eventual intervention of neighboring groups, such as the Musakhel, who helped stabilize the territorial boundaries.
