= Jafar (Pashtun tribe) =

Sarbani Pashtun tribe in Balochistan, Pakistan

- جعفر
- Ethnicity: Pashtun
- Location: Pakistan (Balochistan: Musakhel, Loralai, Quetta; Khyber Pakhtunkhwa: Dera Ismail Khan)
- Parent tribe: Sarbani (Miyana)
- Branches: Khidrani (Khiderzai), Umrani
- Language: Pashto, Jafarki
- Religion: Islam (Sunni)

The Jafar (Pashto: جعفر; also spelled Jaffar) are a Sarbani Pashtun tribe primarily concentrated in the Drug Tehsil of Musakhel District in northern Balochistan, with smaller groups residing in Loralai, Quetta, and Dera Ismail Khan. They are a surviving sub-tribe of the historically prominent Miyana (Mianai) tribal confederacy.

They are primarily found along the eastern slopes of the Sulaiman Mountains, a region that has historically overlapped with Baloch and Derajat groups. Lying on this frontier zone along with centuries of interaction with outside groups means that the Jafar have developed some unique traits over time; the most striking of these is their language, Jafarki (Jafriki), which is spoken alongside Pashto.

== Etymology ==
The tribe is named after its ancestor, Jafar, who is recorded in traditional Pashtun genealogies, such as Nimatullah al-Harawi's Makhzan-i-Afghani (c. 1612), as the seventh among the thirteen sons of Miyana, son of Sharkhbun.

In colonial records, a section of the Jafar was assimilated by the Shadozai (Kibzai Kakars) residing in Dukki, where they were known as Shakun, a name also used by neighboring tribes in Musakhel District to refer to the Jafar. In the Makhzan-i-Afghani, Shakun is listed as one of the sons of Miyana, and the ancestor of the Zmarai Pashtuns, also found in Musakhel District.

== History ==
=== Medieval Miyana homeland and dispersion ===
The Miyana tribal confederacy is described as having inhabited the slopes of the Takht-e-Sulaiman region during the medieval period. This region is located along modern-day southern Dera Ismail Khan, directly east of the Shirani territories. During the reign of Bahlul Khan Lodhi (r. 1451–1489) and later under the Mughal Empire, large numbers of Miyana tribesmen migrated to the Indian subcontinent, where they achieved prominence. Figures such as Bahlol Khan Miyana and Ikhlas Khan Miyana rose to high imperial nobility during the Mughal period, with Bahlol Khan eventually founding the princely state of Savanur in the Deccan.

As the bulk of the Miyana in India assimilated into local populations and the remnants fragmented in the frontier, only a few branches, namely the Luni, Zmarai, Gharshin, and Jafar, retained distinct tribal territories in northern Balochistan, while other branches were largely assimilated by other groups. An example of this is the Bulfarz section among the Esote Panri residing north of the Jafars, which the Baluchistan District Gazetteer: Loralai, published in 1907, states was considered a Miani subsection.

=== Migration to the Drug Valley ===
After the Jafar settled in Drug they occupied a buffer zone between various populations. To the north and west they were bordered by Panri Pashtuns (specifically the Esote and Musakhel) and to the south and east by the Buzdar Baloch of the Dera Ghazi Khan plains.

Major Henry George Raverty mentioned the impact of neighboring groups on the Jafar in his Notes on Afghanistan and Part of Baluchistan (1888) as follows:

They have the Pannis of Isot and Musa Khel branches on the West, but on the east and south, the Bozadar Balochs dwell. From the incursions and encroachment of these people, Jafars have suffered, as well as others of the Miyana tribe. In former times, traders used to pass their territory, but the depredations of the Baloch tribes led them to take another route.

— Major H. G. Raverty, Notes on Afghanistan and Part of Baluchistan (1888), p. 515

Due to their lack of numerical strength British ethnographers described them as a "weak Pathan tribe" by the 19th century. Colonial reports also state that the Jafars fell into conflict with the Gurchani Baloch in a battle near Nath, where between 80 and 100 tribesmen were killed. It was only through the timely intervention of their neighbors, the Musakhel, that they were able to defend their territories.

== Demographics and subdivisions ==
=== Geographic distribution ===
The Jafar primarily reside in Drug Tehsil, a subdivision of Musakhel District in northeastern Balochistan. It lies along the border with the Dera Ismail Khan and Dera Ghazi Khan districts. Smaller groups and families of this tribe also reside in the neighboring Loralai and Quetta districts. According to some colonial sources, a small subsection of this tribe, the Ispani, also resided in Zhob.

=== Subdivisions ===
According to the Baluchistan District Gazetteer: Loralai, published in 1907, the Jafars of Musakhel are divided into two primary khels (clans):

- Khidrani (also known as Khizderzai)
- Umrani

British administrators also noted that different branches operating within the Jafar tribe, such as the Rahwani, Somat, and Surani, were once independent Mianai lineages that have become integrated into the Jafar. Similarly, in the Khulasat-ul-Ansab's section on Mianai Pashtuns, Hafiz Rahmat Khan Barech refers to Rahwani as an independent branch located near "Kasighar" (House of Qais), which is the Pashto name for Takht-e-Sulaiman.

== Language and culture ==
=== The Jafarki dialect ===
Due to centuries of contact with neighboring ethnic groups along the Derajat plains such as the Baloch, the Jafar have absorbed some cultural and linguistic influences from their neighbors. Their language Jafarki is described as a Western Punjabi dialect and the Loralai gazetteer calls Jafarki similar to Khetrani, also known as Barazai. Furthermore, in his 1911 A Glossary of the Tribes and Castes of the Punjab and North-West Frontier Province, H. A. Rose described the Jafar as speaking "Jatki or western Punjabi."

A 1938 military handbook published by the Government of India (Pathans, Recruiting Office, Peshawar) provided a more specific classification, calling Jafarki a mix of Pashto and Jatraki:

With the passage of time the Jafars have acquired a number of Baluch and Jatraki traits and now speak a language that is a mixture of Jatraki and Pashto and is called Jafarki.

— Pathans: Handbooks for the Indian Army (1938)

=== Culture ===
Colonial ethnographers consistently described the Jafars as Pashtuns integrated within the larger Pashtun tribal system in modern-day northern Balochistan. According to the 1998 census report of the MusaKhel district, the tribe practices pashtun culture (Pashtunwali) with some traces of the Dera Ghazi Khan Baloch culture. Many members of the tribe today are bilingual in both Pashto and Jafarki, and the tribe maintains social and political alliances with surrounding groups.

== See also ==
- Pashtun tribes
- Sarbani
- Miana (Pashtun tribe)
- Musakhel District
