= Shirani (Pashtun tribe) =

Pashtun tribe in Afghanistan and northwest Pakistan

The Shirani (Pashto: شيراني), also spelled Sherani, are a Pashtun tribe, from the Sarbani tribal confederacy, who live in Afghanistan and Pakistan. The Sherani are mostly settled in the Dera Ismail Khan District, in the Khyber Pakhtunkhwa, Pakistan and in the adjoining Sherani District of Balochistan, Pakistan. Some clans have settled in other surrounding districts of Balochistan; and in the Zabul, Ghazni, and Kandahar provinces of Afghanistan.

== Sherani district ==
=== History ===
==== Medieval era ====
According to Syed Amin Amirzai, an elder of Frontier Region Dera Ismail Khan, Sherani was the name of the forefather of the tribe. He had four sons named Abubakar, Hassan, Marhal, and Kaif. The people of clan Oba Khail are descended from Abubakar, clan Hassan Khail from Hassan, clan Marhail from Marhal, and clan Kapip from Kaif. Abubakar and Hassan were born of Sherani's first wife, while Marhal and Kaif were of his second wife. Abubakar and Hassan were preferred to Marhal and Kaif, so the second wife suggested that Sherani marry his serving woman so that son could be equal to Kaif and Marhal and they could have rights equal to Abubakar and Hassan. Sherani married his serving woman, and he named the newborn son Soharh, which in the Pashto language means "son of serving women". The clan descended from Soharh is the Soharh Khail, and they live in Mughul Kot near the Sherani District in Balochistan.

Another tradition, substantiated by the Gazetteer, says that about four hundred years ago Bargha lands were laying waste for fear of the Wazir, and the Sherani were in constant and protracted war with the Bettani. The Sherani leader met a Syed boy who had migrated from Pishin District, sought his supernatural help, and the Sheranis were victorious over the Bettani. The leading Sherani men sent some of their tribe under the boy's leadership to occupy the deserted lands of Bargha. Following the occupation of the Bargha land, the leading men of Sherani told the Syed boy to run his horse from dawn to dusk, with the land within that run to be his allocation of booty. The Syed ran his horse, but before dusk, the horse being overstretched ran down and died, while the Syed was performing his Asar Prayer. This boy later married a Sherani woman and became the progenitor of the Harifal tribe, which now occupies the land.

British scholar Henry Walter Bellew hypothesized that the Sheorani were originally Rajput Indians of Hindu origin, adhering to Shaivism.

All Sheranis, irrespective of their geography, out of courtesy call a Harifal tribe Neeka, meaning grandfather. A position of reverence even above father. When Mountstuart Elphinstone visited this region in the early 19th century, he recorded that the Sherani were led by a "Neeka" who was supported by an annual tax of one lamb and one calf on all those who raised those animals. The Neeka served as a judge and a commander-in-chief and derived his authority from the belief that he is under the immediate guidance and protection of Providence.

The Neeka commands in their wars, and before any expedition, all the troops pass under his turban, which is stretched out for the purpose by the Neeka and a Moollah. This they think secures them from wounds and death; and they tell stories of persons who have died from neglecting or disdaining this ceremony.

The recognized khan of both the Largha and Bargha Sherani, Khan Mir Ajab Khan, still lives in Largha. Until recently he and his family's leading members used to make periodic visit to Harifal country to pay homage and seek blessings.

==== British India ====
During the 19th century, the tribal group known as the Sherani was recorded as living on the northwest Punjab border in what became the North-West Frontier Province (NWFP) of British India. After annexation by the British, their homeland became a part of the Sherani Agency. The agency occupied an area of 1,500 square miles (3,900 km^{2}), and had a population of 12,371, according to the 1901 census. The Sherani occupied the principal portion of the mountain known as the Takht-e-Sulaiman, and the country southeast from there to the border of Dera Ismail Khan district, close to Balochistan. They were constrained on the north by the Gomal Pass, and beyond that by the Mahsud and Waziri tribes; on the south by the Ustarana and Zimri tribes; and on the west by the Harifal, Kakar, and Mandokhel tribes.

In June 1891, the first Political Agent of Zhob, Captain I. MacIver (in office 22 January 1890 to 14 March 1898), and Sir Henry visited the area of Takht-e-Sulaiman. Their account, dated 8 August 1894, was published in The Geographical Journal of that year.

The people of Sherani district resisted the British occupation. Masho Khan Sherani, a folk hero, was the refractive leader of these Sherani warriors. He was killed during fighting against British army in the "Silyazi" area of Zhob district. After his murder, his many companions were arrested, including his confidant Adam Khan Harifal.

=== Geography ===
In the northeast of the Balochistan plateau, the Zhob and Sherani basins form a lobe surrounded on all side by mountains. The Sherani district occupies an area of 2,800 square kilometres (1,100 sq mi). The general elevation of the district is about 1,500 to 3,000 metres (4,900 to 9,800 ft).

Kaseghar was known to the British as Takht-e-Sulaiman, or Throne of Solomon. With its highest peak at 3,441 metres (11,289 ft), it marks the eastern boundary of the district. With its sister peak Shinghar, 9,273 feet (2,826 m) in height, Kaseghar is one of the highest points of the Suleiman range.

Takht-e-Sulaiman shrine is situated on a ledge below the crest on the southernmost bluff of Kaseghar mountain,. Many legends are connected with the shrine. One says that Noah's Ark alighted there after the deluge, while another connects the shrine with King Solomon, whose throne alighted on this peak, which has ever since borne the name of Takht-e-Sulaiman.

Qais Abdul Rashid (575 AD - 661 AD), who is believed to be one of the progenitors of the Pashtuns, lived in the Suleiman Mountains. Natives call the place where he is buried Kaseghar (the "mountain of Qais", but "Kase" because, in the Pashto dialect, there is no "Q").

Other peaks include Torghar, which is the continuation of southern hills of the Suleiman range, whose highest peak is Charkundai, 7,517 feet (2,291 m) above sea level. The mountain ranges west of Takht-e-Sulaiman contain strata of liassic (lower Jurassic), and middle Jurassic (about 146 to 208 million years ago).

The actual length of the gorge is 4 miles. The enclosing limestone cliffs rise perpendicularly some 15,000 feet (4,600 m). The gorge gradually narrows from 20 yards to a few feet. From 1895 to 1905, the British made a road through pass thus connecting Zhob with DIK. Inhabitants of the district generally live in stone-built houses with flat mud roofs, while nomads live in improvised tenements.

=== Climate ===
Rainfall is about 10 inches (250 mm). During the monsoon, from July to September, the district receives heavy rainfall, with rain clouds coming from the Gulf of Bengal. The climate is hot and dry in summer. January is the coldest month, with mean maximum and minimum temperatures of about 11.5 °C (52.7 °F) and 1.9 °C (35.4 °F) respectively. July is the hottest month, with mean maximum and minimum temperatures of about 36.7 °C (98.1 °F) to 21.8 °C (71.2 °F) respectively.

=== Modern district ===
Geographically the Sheranis are divided into two groups. Those residing east of the Suleiman range are known as the Largha Sheranis, who fall under the administrative control of DIK, while those residing to the west are called the Bargha Shirans and are under the jurisdiction of Sherani district. This division was effected by the British raj following the Khiderzai Expedition of 1890. The geography of the country makes the separation so complete that the two tribal divisions act independently of each other. The Bargha lands were formerly held by Hazaras, who deserted the country and migrated to Rozgan in the north.

The modern Sherani district was created in January 2006, following the bifurcation of Zhob District. It is bounded by Zhob on the west and north, on the south by Musakhil (Zimri), on the east the contiguous district is DIK (for 225 kilometres (140 mi)). Dahna Pass links the district with DIK. The district headquarters is under construction at Stano Raaghah. The main language of the district is Pashto.

== Other territories ==
=== India ===
Besides the populations living in Pakistan and Afghanistan, there is Sherani Abad village in the Nagaur district of Rajasthan, India. That village has four mohallas: Sufiya, Gausiya, Najmiyan and Noori. There are also small villages—like Barnel, Bheniyad, Danta, Hamidpur and Dungari—with Sherani communities. The renowned Urdu poet Akhtar Sheerani belongs to this community. His father Hafiz Mehmood Khan Sherani was a noted author, and it was in his name that the Rajasthan Urdu Academy award was given. This family now resides primarily in Pakistan, in Lahore, Dera Ismail Khan, and Karachi.

Some Sherani Pathans also lived in Vadnagar, Gujarat, India. They lived in Shemberwada, near Samarkand. Pathan Sherani tribes migrated to India during the time of the Mughal Emperor Humayun, who with the support of Sherani Pathan warriors was victorious in battle when he came to India for the second time. During the reign of the Mughal Emperor Akbar (son of Humayun), the Sherani Pathans migrated to Kaligam, near Ahemdabad, Gujarat. At that time, the Nawab of Gujarat sent them to fight the Dodia Rajput near the Rajasthan-Gujarat border. The Sherani Pathan defeated the Dodia Rajput in battle, and took over their land. They were called Shembher (or Summer), since they came from Samarkand.

=== Afghanistan ===
During the era of Amir Amanullah Khan, many Harifal families migrated to Afghanistan during the British Raj in colonial India and are still settled there in Loghar, Makwar, and Kabul. Prominent amongst them were Nazak, Harifal, Abdulraheem Harifal, Gooloon Harifal, and Majeed Harifal. Dr. Ghouse Khan Sherani, Dewan of Jayachamarajendra Wadiyar, King of Mysore, settled in Tumkur district, Karnataka. He was a prominent leader of Muslims, and also a freedom fighter. Today there is road named after him as "Sherani Road" in Tumkur. His grandchildren settled in Tumkur City and Bangalore City, Karnataka, India.

== Bibliography ==
- Paget, William Henry (1874) "Section II: The Shirani Expedition, March 1853" A record of the expeditions undertaken against the North-west frontier tribes. Compiled from the military and political despatches, Lieut.-Colonel McGregor's gazetteer, and other official sources. Office of Supt. of Govt. Printing, Calcutta, OCLC 28445038
