= Darazinda Tehsil =

Coordinates: 31.30°N 69.55°E

Drazanda Tehsil تحصیل درازندہ درازنده تحصیل
- Tehsil
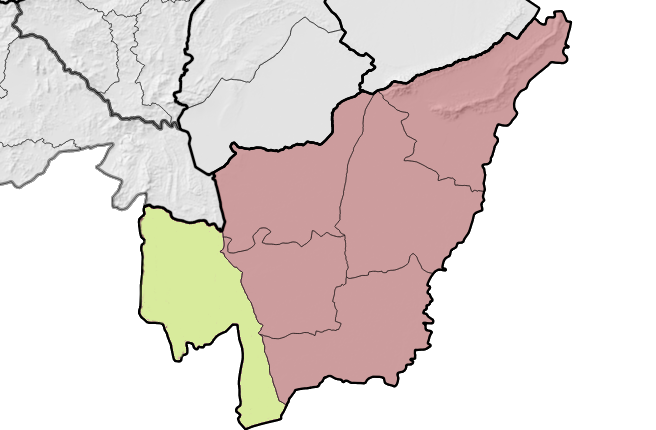
- Location of Darazinda Tehsil (yellow) within Dera Ismail Khan District, Pakistan
- Country: Pakistan
- Region: Khyber Pakhtunkhwa
- District: Dera Ismail Khan District
- Headquarters: Drazanda

Area
  - Total: 2,008 km^{2} (775 sq mi)

Population (2017)
  - Total: 68,556
  - Density: 34.14/km^{2} (88.43/sq mi)
- Former name: Frontier Region Dera Ismail Khan سرحدی علاقہ ڈیره اسماعیل خان دېره اسماعيل خان سرحدي سیمه

Darazinda Tehsil, also known as Drazanda Tehsil, is an administrative subdivision (tehsil) of Dera Ismail Khan District in Khyber Pakhtunkhwa province of Pakistan - the capital is the town of Drazanda. It borders South Waziristan to the north, Dera Ghazi Khan and Musa Khel to the south and Zhob to the west.

== History ==
Prior to 2018, Darazinda Tehsil was known as Dera Ismail Khan Subdivision, and prior to that it was Frontier Region Dera Ismail Khan. Before the merger of the subdivision into Dera Ismail Khan District it was a Frontier Region to the west of Dera Ismail Khan District.

== Geography and climate ==
The geography of Drazanda Tehsil is mostly hilly as it lies near the Sulaiman Range. The Sherani area is totally under the eastern shadow of the range's highest peak Takht-e-Sulaiman. The northern side is bounded by Gomal Pass. The Koh Sulaiman Forest is located within Drazanda Tehsil in January 2025 a fire broke out damaging pine nuts, olive, and other valuable trees, the residents of the area urged the government to take action to assist them.

== Militancy ==
In May 2024 a mobile police van was attacked with hand grenades and firing which resulted in the deaths of a Station House Officer and three of the attackers. In October 2024 militant attacks took place across Khyber Pakhtunkhwa - the worst attack was in Darazinda where 10 Frontier Constabulary personnel were killed. In July 2025 security personnel were killed by an improvised explosive device, the personnel were members of the Frontier Corps which was moving in a convoy through the area.

== Demography ==
The population of Darazinda Tehsil over the years is shown below, the census figures display information when the area was known as "Dera Ismail Khan Subdivision" and "Frontier Region Dera Ismail Khan".

Historical population
Year	Pop.	±%
1972	49,822	—
1981	55,824	+12.0%
1998	38,990	−30.2%
2017	68,556	+75.8%

According to the 2017 census the total population of Darazinda Tehsil is 68,500. The first language of 97.6% of the population is Pashto - Pashto is the main language of Khyber Pakhtunkwa province, the census recorded that out of a total population of 40,641,120 in Khyber Pakhtunkwa 32,919,592 (i.e. 81%) spoke Pashto as their first language, Darazinda at 97.6% is significantly above this.

Out of the remaining 3.4%, Urdu the national language of Pakistan is spoken by 1.07% of the population as a first language, other languages are Saraiki 0.61%, Balochi 0.23%, Sindhi 0.22%, Brahvi 0.13%, Punjabi and Kashmiri both 0.02% and Hindko which is less than 0.01. Punjabi is Pakistan's most widely spoken language, however in Darazinda it is not so prominent - likewise Hindko which dominates eastern part of Khyber Pakhtunkwa doesn't have much of a presence in Darazinda.

Mother tongues of residents
Language	Number of speakers	Percentage
Pushto	66,890	97.65%
Urdu	735	1.07%
Saraiki	418	0.61%
Balochi	155	0.23%
Sindhi	151	0.22%
Brahvi	90	0.13%
Others	30	0.04%
Punjabi	13	0.02%
Kashmiri	12	0.02%
Hindko	3	<0.01%

First languages of Drazanda Tehsil (2017 census)
1. Pashto (97.6%)
2. Urdu (1.07%)
3. Saraiki (0.61%)
4. Balochi (0.23%)
5. Sindhi (0.22%)
6. Brahui (0.13%)
7. Punjabi (0.02%)
8. Kashmiri (0.02%)
9. Others (0.26%)
First languages of Drazanda Tehsil (Pashto removed)
1. Urdu (45.7%)
2. Saraiki (26.0%)
3. Balochi (9.65%)
4. Sindhi (9.40%)
5. Brahui (5.60%)
6. Punjabi (0.81%)
7. Kashmiri (0.75%)
8. Hindko (0.19%)
9. Others (1.87%)

== Health ==
In October 2024 a polio case was confirmed in Union Council Morga, bringing the provincial total to 4. In November 2024 two cases of polio were reported in Darazinda, a 3-year-old girl and an 18-month-old boy, taking the total reported cases in the district of Dera Ismail Khan to 5 for that year, polio is endemic in southern districts of Khyber Pakhtunkhwa. In May 2025 the authorities seemed to be taking steps to eradicate polio in area, with Assistant Commissioner of Darazinda Tehsil Syed Muhammad Arslan meeting polio eradication teams. Security threats due to ongoing militancy in the area and problems accessing the vaccine contribute to polio still being endemic in this area. In June 2025 it was reported that due to a funding crisis hospitals across the merged districts that hospitals could close with Darazinda affected.

== Education ==
According to the Alif Ailaan Pakistan District Education Rankings 2015, Drazanda Tehsil is ranked 127 out of 148 districts in terms of education. For facilities and infrastructure, the tehsil is ranked 95 out of 148.

== See also ==
- Federally Administered Tribal Areas
- Dera Ismail Khan District
