= Storyani =

Pashtun tribe of Sayyid origin

The Storyani (Pashto: ستورياني), also called Ustrani or Ustarana, are a Pashtun tribe of Sayyid origin inhabiting the Frontier Region in the outer hills opposite the extreme south of Dera Ismail Khan district of Khyber Pakhtunkhwa Province, Pakistan. They have occupied the eastern slope of Suleiman Mountains. To their north lies Gomal River, which separates South Waziristan Agency from this region. To their south west across Baluchistan border is Zhob and Dukki, to the east towards Daman plains with the Gandapurs of Kulachi, to the west with Musa Khel and Zmaryani while Qaisrani (a Balouch tribe) on the south.

== History and origin ==
Until about the 18th century the Storyani were entirely a pastoral and trading tribe; they were venturesome traders, carrying goods from Kandahar as far as West Bengal, but the feud with their neighbors the Musa Khel and the Bozdar put a stop to their annual westward immigration, and they were forced to take to agriculture and subsequently acquired a good deal of the country below the hills. Their territory includes the eastern slopes of the Suleiman Mountains, the crest of the range being held by the Musa Khel, and Zmaryani. Storyanis are descended from Syed Gesdudaraz I and his Sherani wife, who had five sons.
