= Naivela =

Coordinates: 31°37′52″N 70°46′58″E

- Town and union council
- Interactive map of Naivela
- Country: Pakistan
- Province: Khyber Pakhtunkhwa
- District: Dera Ismail Khan District
- Time zone: UTC+5 (PST)

Naivela is a town and union council of Dera Ismail Khan District in Khyber Pakhtunkhwa province of Pakistan. It is located at 31°37'52N 70°46'58E and has an altitude of 151 metres (498 feet).
