= University Wensam College =

School in Khyber Pakhtunkhwa, Pakistan

University WENSAM College
- یونیورسٹی ونسام کالج

Location
- Multan road, Dera Ismail Khan; Khyber Pakhtunkhwa; Dera Ismail khan, Dera Ismail Khan District, Khyber Pakhtunkhwa, Khyber Pakhtunkhwa, 29100; Pakistan; 31.8464°N 70.6350°E

Information
- Other name: Government Comprehensive High School Dera Ismail Khan
- Former name: Government Comprehensive High School Dera Ismail Khan
- School type: Public
- Motto: Education for a Better Future (تعلیم ایک بہتر مستقبل کے لیے)
- Established: 1979 (as University Wensam College)
- Status: Active
- Locale: Urban
- School district: Dera Ismail Khan
- Chairman: Kamran Bashir
- Principal: Kamran Bashir
- Gender: Male and Female
- Classes: Primary Education, Secondary Education, Computer Sciences, Pre-Engineering, Pre-Medical, Arts, Pedagogy
- Language: Urdu, English
- Campus: Urban campus
- Colors: Green and White
- Song: National Anthem Of Pakistan
- Sports: Cricket, hockey, football
- Mascot: Wensamers
- Website: https://wensamcollege.com/

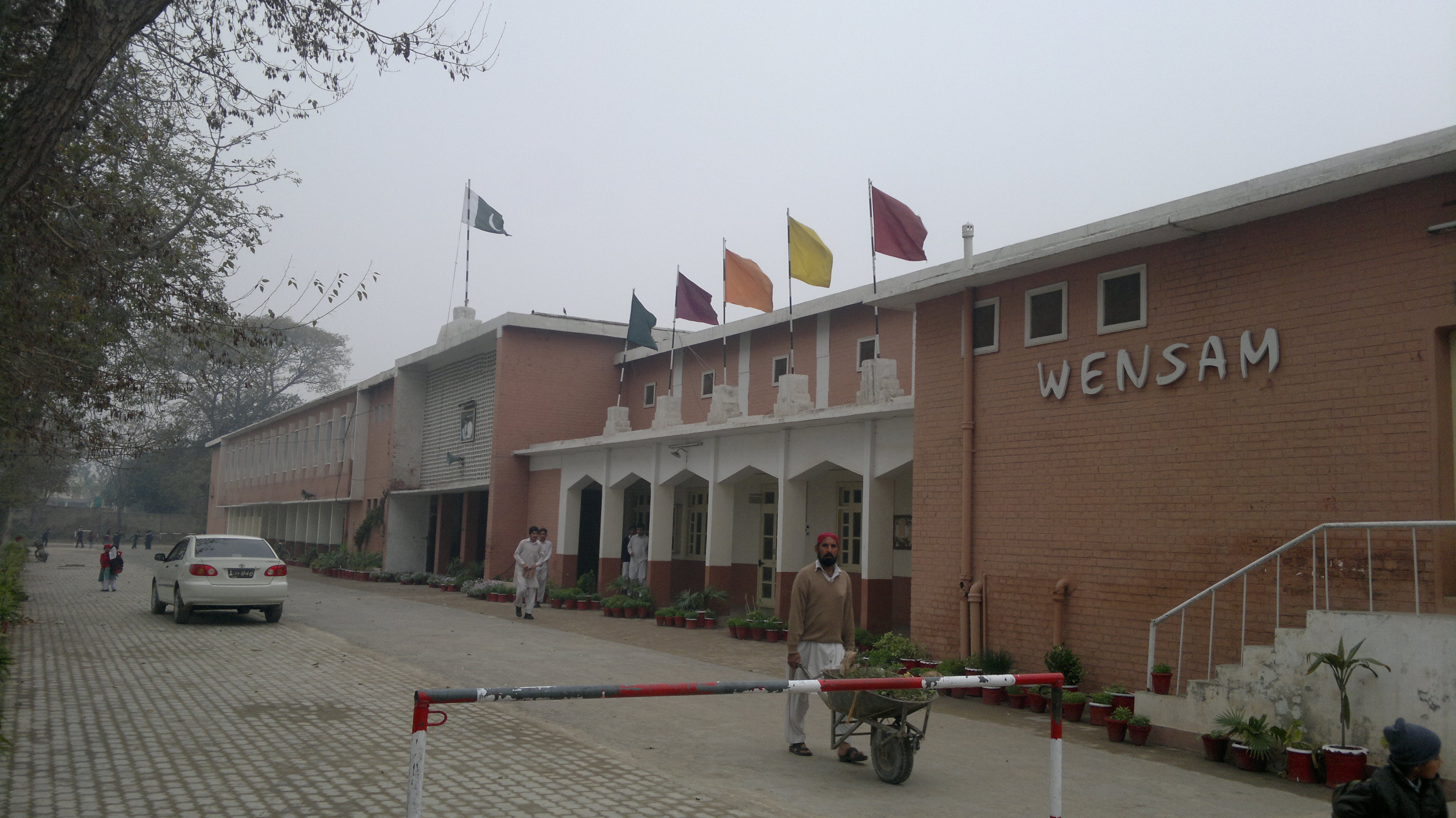
WENSAM College

University Wensam College, previously named Government Comprehensive High School Dera Ismail Khan, is a higher secondary school located in Dera Ismail Khan, Khyber Pakhtunkhwa, Pakistan. It was renamed when it was taken over by Gomal University in 1979. It produces best results in male education in Board of Intermediate and Secondary Education Dera Ismail Khan.

== Admission ==
Students can get admission to study:

- Primary Education
- Secondary Education
- Computer Sciences
- Pre-Engineering
- Pre-medical
- The arts
- Pedagogy
- Art or Drawing

== Junior section ==
Junior section is controlled by female staff and headed by a Headmistress. It enrolls both male and female children in grades one to five and a nursery class. The medium of education is both Urdu and English. Separate assembly and school times are observed for the junior section of the college. There are 3 dedicated playgrounds and a canteen for this section.

== Senior section ==
Senior section is controlled by the principal of the college. However, the responsibility of the whole college is under Vice Chancellery of Gomal University. There are two divisions of the senior section. The High School division holds classes for grade 6 to grade 10 and classes for male and female students are held in separate classrooms. This section is mainly located on the first floor of the main college building. The College division of the senior section holds classes for Intermediate level with separate sections for pre-medical and pre-engineering groups. There is a dedicated library in this section which is open to all students of the institution during office hours. The science labs are mainly located in this section of the institute.

== Etymology and structure ==
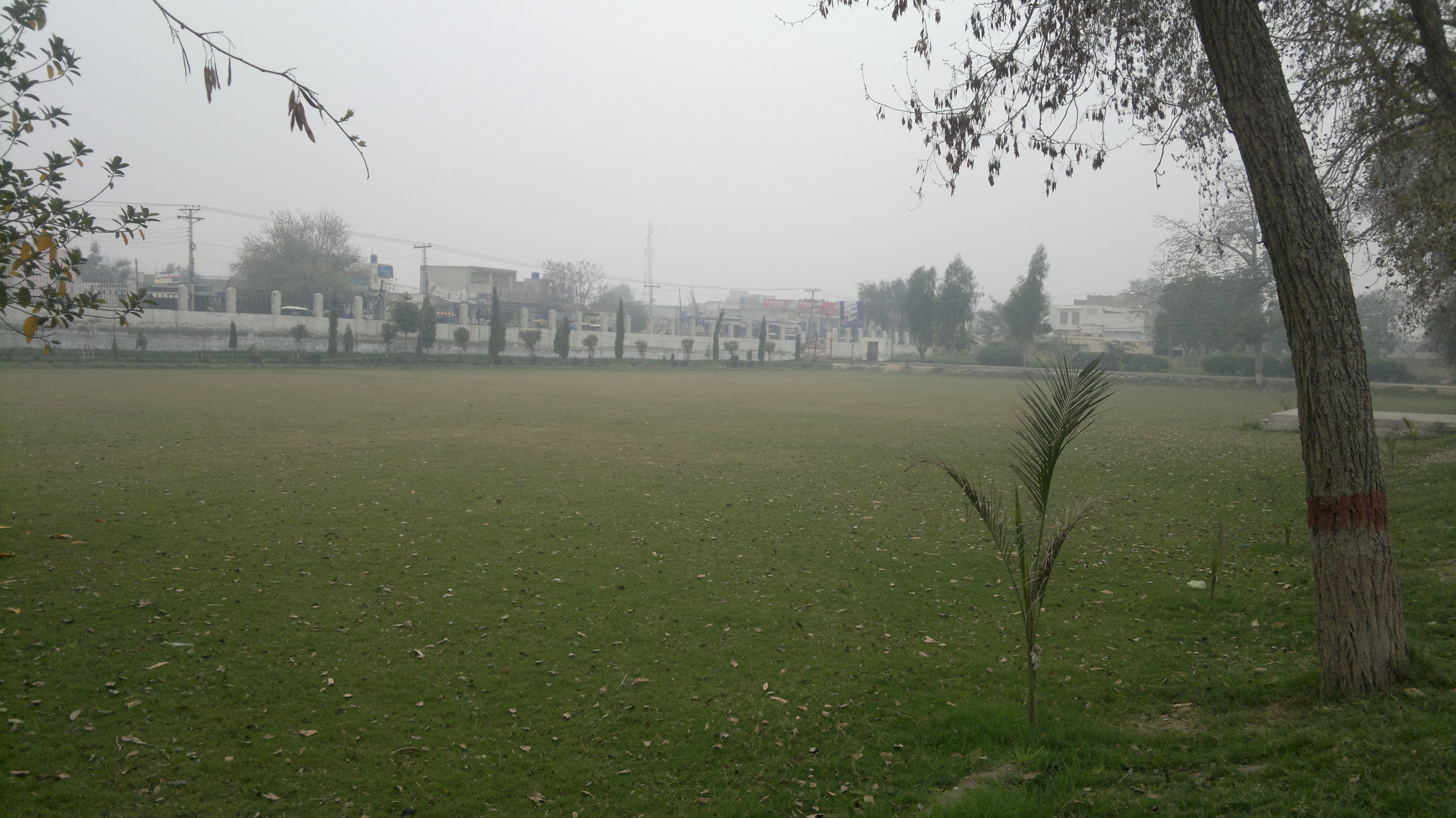
Main Assembly Ground

The word WENSAM is the combination of six words that are W for Woodwork, E for Electricity, N for Nursery, S for Science, A for Arts, M for Metalwork. The institute has a main building composed of a two floors. The ground floor houses the College section and the Primary Section which are separated by the offices of the Principal and other administrative offices. The ground floor also sports the main auditorium and indoor sports hall along with a wall of fame. The main building has a front assembly ground and a football ground to the north of assembly. Behind the main building are the science labs and staff rooms for teacher and other staff separated by dedicated gardens. There is a Western Football and Hockey ground and a student Hostel and a Mosque to the west of the West Ground. The residential houses for the Principal of the college and their supporting staff are also on site of the campus.

== Divisions ==
College is divided in to three sections:

- Junior section from nursery to fifth class
- Secondary section elongate from sixth class to Matriculation level
- Senior section contains Intermediate classes
