= Drazanda =

Drazanda درازندہ درازنده
- Location within Khyber Pakhtunkhwa
- Coordinates: 31.706926°N 70.135163°E
- Country: Pakistan
- Region: Khyber Pakhtunkhwa
- District: Dera Ismail Khan
- Tehsil: Drazanda Tehsil

Government
  - Chairman: Izat Gull (IND)

Population (2017)
  - Total: 8,842

Drazanda (also spelled Darazinda or Drazinda) is a main village or small town in Dera Ismail Khan District of Pakistan's Khyber Pakhtunkhwa province. It is the capital of Darazinda Tehsil and has a population of 8,842, according to the 2017 Census of Pakistan.

The Takht-e-Sulaiman (Solomon's throne), the highest peak of the Sulaiman Mountains is located near Drazanda. At 3,487 metres (11,440 ft), it is the highest peak in Dera Ismail Khan District and the greater Shirani region. 14th-century Maghrebi explorer Ibn Battuta named Takht-e-Sulaiman as Kōh-e Sulaymān, "Mount of Solomon".
