= Harifal =

Pashtun tribe

The Harifal (Pashto:حریفال) is a subtribe of the Shirani Pashtun tribe in the Balochistan province of Pakistan, and, to a lesser extent, the surrounding districts of Afghanistan.

== History ==
Under Arif's leadership, the Shiranis sent a portion of their tribe to occupy Bargha. Arif later married a Shirani women (according to tradition, his second wife and the mother of the Ibrahikhail sub-tribe), and thus became the eponymous ancestor of the Harifal tribe.

This account is corroborated by Olaf Caroe, who wrote that "the genealogies frequently supply actual confirmation of observable differences today."

An account of the warlike nature of the Hurreepaul tribe is given by the Scottish historian Mountstuart Elphinstone in his book An account of the kingdom of Caubul, and its dependencies in Persia, Tartary, and India: comprising a view of the Afghaun nation, and a history of the Dooraunee monarch, "The Sheeraunees [Sheranis] are at war with all the tribes that pass through their country in their annual migrations. They may, indeed, be said to be at war with all the world, since they plunder every traveller that comes within their reach; and besides, make incursions into parts of Damaun, with the inhabitants of which they have no quarrel. While I was in their neighbourhood, they stopped the body of a Dooraunee of rank, which was going through their country to be buried at Candahar, and detained it till a ransom had been paid for it."

== Historical records ==
Mountstuart Elphinstone (1779–1859) says "The tribes of Hurreepaul (sic) and Kuppeep resemble the Sheeraunees, of which tribe they are branches; and their residence is in the hills and valleys at the western base of Tukhti Solimaun. To the north of the Hurreepaul is the country near the junction of the Gomul and Zhobe, sometimes pastured on by wandering Cankers. North of it is Wauneh, a low plain situated on the hills that slope down to the valley of the Gomul."

According to Baluchistan Through the Ages, "The Haripals claim a Saiad descent, and allege that their progenitor, Harif, was a Saiad from Pishin, who migrated to the Shirani country, married a Shirani woman, and was affiliated with the Shiranis".

Herbert Benjamin Edwardes says "It is by the Zirkunnee Pass that caravans go to Kandahar. About five or six miles to the south of the Zirkunnee Pass, is the Pass of Drabund, the mouth of which is about eight miles from Drabund itself. Not very far from midway between the town and the Pass of Drabund, but rather nearer to the latter, are ruins of the former fort of Akhoond Gool Hubeeb. This Akhoond, I was informed, belonged to a tribe called Hurrial, connected with the Sheraunees; the same probably as that of 'Hurreepaul,' mentioned by Mr. Elphinstone as a branch of the Sheraunees, residing 'in the hills and valleys at the western base of Tukht-e-Sulaiman'."

Qazi Abdul Haleem Asar Afghani (1910-1987), a well known Pashto writer (District Mardan, Tehsil Takht Bhai) holds that "Harifal is a minor tribe living in and around Daraban amongst Sheranis. In the twelfth generation of this tribe was a renowned saint by the name of Sheikh Ahmed Zinda-pir.

Sheikh Ahmed Zinda-pir had five sons; eldest among them was Sadar-ud-din, who later became famous by the name of Sheikh Sadar-ud-din Sadar Jahan; an erudite and noted Sufi saint. He migrated to India to spread the word of Islam. In India he reached "Malir Kotla and settled there. Sheikh later married daughter of Sultan Behlul Lodhi. This gave much impetus to his reputation. Stories of his erudition and piety spread far and wide and gradually Malerkotla became the seat of Sufism in India."

Shaikh Sadar Ud-din also known as Haidar Shaikh was born at Daraban, the winter dwellings of the Harifal tribe, in 1437. In 1449, he reached Multan and became the disciple of Baha-ud-din Zakariya. When his master was sure that his disciple was well versed in spirituality, he asked him to go out and help humanity. The Sheikh chose a raised mound near the old village of Maler to build his hut, and there he used to spend his time in prayer.

One distinguished member of this family was Zulfiqar Ali Khan who, although not a nawab, was a figure in the literary history of the riyasat. A close friend of allama Muhammad Iqbal, he was the author of the first biography of the famous poet, titled A Voice from the East.

Stanley Reed (28 January 1872 – 17 January 1969) was a British Conservative Party politician and an important figure in the media of India in the early 20th century. He claims; that Maler kotla's ruling family, though famed as Pathan, is actually Sayyid in its origin, for its ancestral progenitor was Sayyid Husain who migrated from Ghaur during the reign of caliph Abd al-Malik ibn Marwan (646–705 the 5th Umayyad Caliph) and settled in the region neighboring `Kooh-e-Sulaiman.
