= Zandani =

Coordinates: 31°48′50″N 70°40′35″E

- Town and union council
- Interactive map of Zandani
- Country: Pakistan
- Province: Khyber-Pakhtunkhwa
- District: Dera Ismail Khan District
- Time zone: UTC+5 (PST)

Zandani is a town and union council of Dera Ismail Khan District in Khyber-Pakhtunkhwa province of Pakistan. It is located at 31°48'50N 70°40'35E and has an altitude of 174 metres (574 feet).
