= Burg pusht =

Village in Balochistan, Pakistan

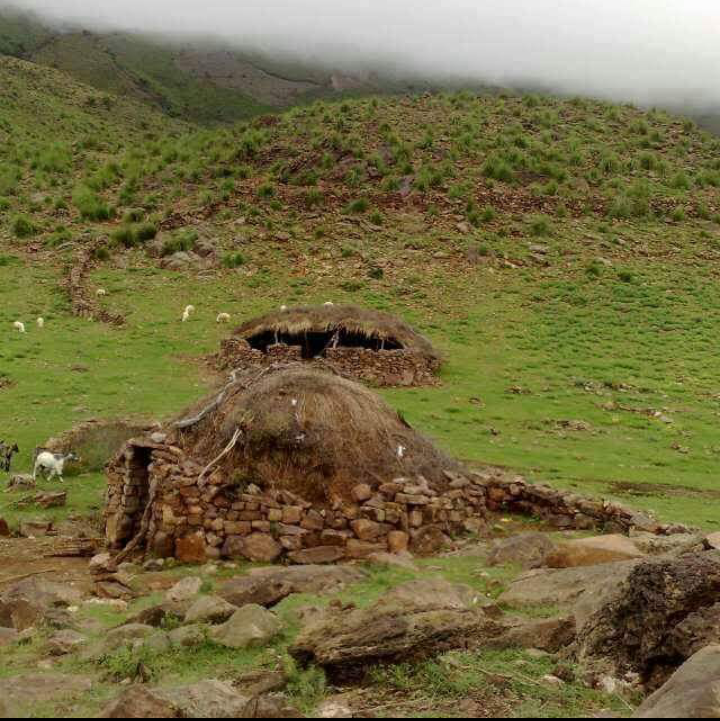
A View of Burg Pusht

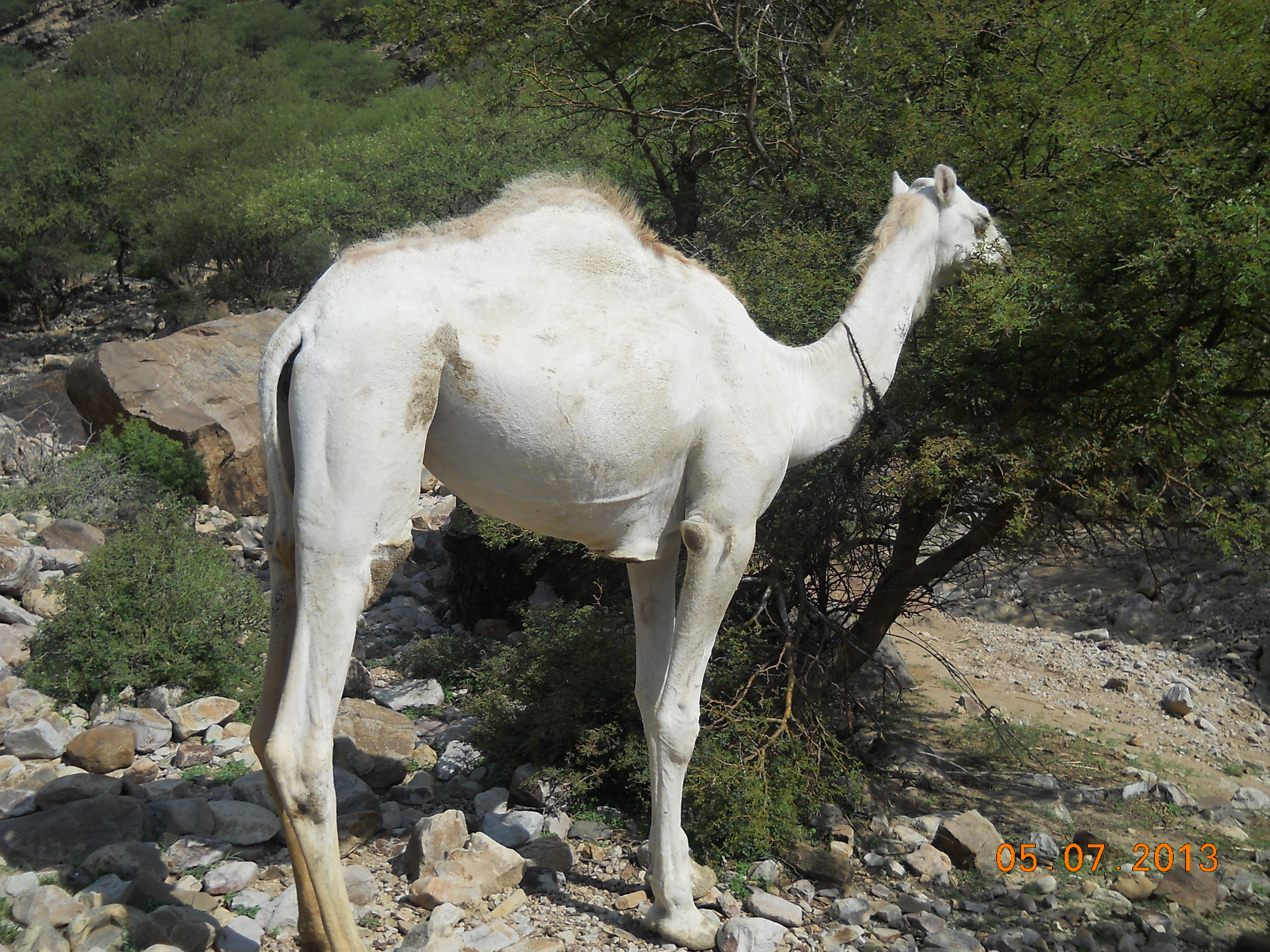
Kohi Breed Camel in burg Pusht

Burg Pusht (Balochi:برگ پْشت) is a village in Musa Khail District, Balochistan, Pakistan with a population of over 1000 residents.

It comes under the vast BUZDAR tribe.

It has a boys' high school, a girls' middle school and a medical dispensary ' Viternary Hospital.

Burg Pusht is a valley of Koh-e-salumman or Salumanian Mountain Range.

In the Burg Pusht are large mountains. In these mountains live camels, goats, sheep, and cows.

Different types of Trees and bushes are found. There are also Senegalia senegal or Kahoor in Balochi are found. Olive trees from 3000 years previous. There is an olive garden where almost 3000 olive trees are planted.
