= Kotla Syedan =

Coordinates: 31°49′27″N 70°50′52″E

- Town and union council
- Interactive map of Kotla Syedan
- Country: Pakistan
- Province: Khyber Pakhtunkhwa
- District: Dera Ismail Khan District
- Time zone: UTC+5 (PST)

Kotla Syedan or Kotla Saidan is a town and union council of Dera Ismail Khan District in Khyber Pakhtunkhwa province of Pakistan. It is located at 31°49'27N 70°50'52E and has an altitude of 164 metres (541 feet).
