= Lachra =

Coordinates: 31°49′45″N 70°52′5″E

Lachra Zafar Abad Colony
- Town and union council
- Interactive map of Lachra
- Country: Pakistan
- Province: Khyber Pakhtunkhwa
- District: Dera Ismail Khan District
- Tehsil: Dera Ismail Khan

Government
  - Type: Local Democratic Government
  - Malik: Malik Qayyum Lachra
- Time zone: UTC+5 (PST)
- Pakistan Post: 29111
- Area code: 0966

Lachra is a town and union council of Dera Ismail Khan District in Khyber Pakhtunkhwa province of Pakistan. It is located at 31°49'45N 70°52'5E and has an altitude of 164 metres (541 feet).
