= Gara Isa Khan =

Coordinates: 31°40′40″N 70°32′0″E

- Town and union council
- Interactive map of Gara Isa Khan
- Country: Pakistan
- Province: Khyber Pakhtunkhwa
- District: Dera Ismail Khan District
- Time zone: UTC+5 (PST)

Gara Isa Khan is a town and union council of Dera Ismail Khan District in Khyber Pakhtunkhwa province of Pakistan. It has an altitude of 186 metres (613 feet).
