= Pul Shekhani =

Village in Pakistan

Pul Shekhani is a village located 28 km from the Dera Ghazi Khan district in Pakistan, near the Koh Suleiman mountain range. Khalid Baloch

== Population ==
Its population is approximately 25,000.

== Religion ==
Most of the people are Muslims.

== Language ==
In this village most of the people use the Saraiki language to communicate with one another.

== Culture ==
Mela Pul Shekhani is held every year to promote their culture, language and brotherhood.

== Income ==
Agriculture and cattle are the major sources of income.
