= University of Agriculture, Dera Ismail Khan =

Agricultural university in Dera Ismail Khan, Pakistan

- Type: Public
- Established: March 2018; 8 years ago
- Chancellor: Governor of Khyber Pakhtunkhwa
- Vice-Chancellor: Dr. Muhammad Latif
- Academic staff: Agriculture, Veterinary and Animal Sciences, Artificial Intelligence, Arts, Basic Sciences and Forestry
- Location: Dera Ismail Khan, Khyber Pakhtunkhwa, Pakistan
- Campus: Fateh Morr, Dera Ismail Khan
- Colors: Green
- Nickname: UAD
- Website: www.uad.edu.pk

The University of Agriculture (UAD), Dera Ismail Khan is a university chartered by the Khyber Pakhtunkhwa Provincial Assembly in March 2018 and recognized by Higher Education Commission (HEC) Pakistan on May 5, 2021. It was originally a faculty of Agriculture in Gomal University, Dera Ismail Khan. The University of Agriculture DI Khan started its academic activities for the Fall-2021. The University of Agriculture is located at the Sadiq Awan Memorial Complex, near Baahoo Flour Mill, Bhakkar Road, Dera Ismail Khan. Currently, UAD is offering different undergraduate and diploma programs. Keeping in view the purpose of its research orientation, the university has started work to develop various research organizations i.e. Date Palm Research Institute Dhakki D.I. Khan, Temperate Research Institute Wana, Sugarcane Research Institute, D.I. Khan.

== Overview and history ==
University of Agriculture Dera Ismail Khan is established by Government of Khyber Pakhtunkhwa in March 2018. It was originally a faculty of Agriculture in Gomal University Dera Ismail Khan. First Senate Meeting of University of Agriculture took place at Governor House Peshawar on June 17, 2021, and the Budget for 2021-22 was approved. The Government of Khyber Pakhtunkhwa has allocated Rs.1000 million for the development works of the university. It was originally a faculty of Agriculture in Gomal University Dera Ismail Khan. The Government of Khyber Pakhtunkhwa has now upgraded the department into full-fledged university in March 2018.

== Departments ==
The University of Agriculture Dera Ismail Khan has currently the following departments.

- Faculty of Veterinary and Animal Sciences (FVAS)
- Department of Agronomy
- Department of Agriculture Chemistry
- Department of Entomology
- Department of Food Science Technology
- Department of Horticulture
- Department of Plant Breeding and Genetics
- Department of Soil & Environmental Sciences
- Department of Basic Sciences
- Department of Forestry
- Department of Animal & Veterinary Sciences
- Department of Botany and Zoology
- Department of Biotechnology & Biochemistry
- Department of Human Nutrition and Dietetics
- Department of English and foreign languages
- Department of Agriculture Economics and Rural Sociology

== See also ==
- Gomal University Dera Ismail Khan
- University of Agriculture, Peshawar
