= Zhmaryani =

Pashtun tribe in Balochistan and Khyber Pakhtunkhwa, Pakistan

The Zmarai (also known as Gumaryani or Gamaryani; locally written as Pashto: ژمرياني / گمریانی) are a Pashtun tribe recorded in colonial and local sources. Variant ethnonyms include Zhmaryani and Zimri/Mizri.

== Etymology and oral traditions ==
They are traditionally grouped within the Shakun branch of the Sarbani Miyana (or Mianai) lineage by historical texts such as Nimat Allah al-Harawi's Makhzan-i-Afghani (c.1612) and the Khulasat-al-Ansab (1770). Although classifications can vary, Gazetteers and other colonial sources also grouped them among the Mianai tribe, linking them to the Luni and Jafar.

Local folklore glosses Zimri/Zhmaryani with the Pashto word zmarai (زمری, lion/tiger). According to oral tradition, the name was given in the Sulaiman Mountains near Musakhail as an honorific for bravery. These stories are widely told but not linguistically attested in academic sources.

== Geography ==
Hafiz Barech's Khulasat-al-Ansab directly places them on the eastern slopes of the Takht-e-Suleiman region, East of the Sherani around the year 1770. Modern placement includes the following areas:

- Balochistan: Concentrated in the Zhob–Musakhail tract and adjacent hills of the Sulaiman Mountains.
- Khyber Pakhtunkhwa: In Nowshera District, especially Pirpiai and nearby settlements (e.g., Pushtoon Garhi, Amankot, Mohib Banda) as noted in regional chronicles.

Toponymic evidence includes a locality called Zimri Plaseen in Musakhel District (Drug Tehsil), confirming the persistence of the name.

== Pirpiai tradition ==
Local histories attribute the founding of Pir Piai to Pir Muhammad Khan, son of Daulat Khan. Daulat Khan is remembered as a confidant of Nader Shah during his campaigns of the 1730s. According to these accounts, after Nader Shah's conquest of Ghazni and Herat, the Dalazak village at the present Pirpiai site was destroyed, and the land was granted to Daulat Khan, identified as Gamaryani/Gumoriani.

== Sub-divisions ==
A dictionary of Pathan tribes, prepared by the Indian General Staff Army Headquarters, lists the following primary sub-sections amongst them:

- MuhammadKhel
- IsmailKhel
