= Qurtuba University =

University in Pakistan

- Qurtuba University
- Type: Private
- Established: 2001
- Founder: Abdul Aziz Khan Niazi (late)
- Affiliations: Higher Education Commission of Pakistan, Pakistan Engineering Council
- Vice-Chancellor: Huzaifa Sabri
- Location: Dera Ismail Khan & Peshawar, Khyber Pakhtunkhwa, Pakistan
- Campus: Dera Ismail Khan & Peshawar
- Nickname: QU
- Website: www.qurtuba.edu.pk

Qurtuba University (QU) is a private educational institution established in Pakistan in 2001. Qurtuba is the Arabic variation of the name of the formerly Al-Andalus and current Spanish city of Córdoba. It has two campuses in Dera Ismail Khan and Peshawar, Pakistan. Both are separately recognized and placed in the highest 'W3' category by the Higher Education Commission of Pakistan (HEC). It has seventh position among universities of Pakistan by the HEC rankings. It is chartered by the Government of Khyber Pakhtunkhwa and approved by the HEC.

Qurtuba University of Science and Information Technology is one of the pioneer private sector universities of Khyber Pakhtunkhwa.

== History ==
The university was established through a charter issued by the Governor (K.P.K) on 30 August 2001 and is recognized by the Higher Education commission (former UGC), Islamabad. In 2006, the Girls School & College was separated. In 2008, a model school in P.I.A society Lahore was established.

== Achievements ==
Qurtuba University of Science & IT has been awarded ‘W3’ Category by the Higher Education Commission of Pakistan in the new ranking system and has placed among the top ranked universities of the country. Qurtuba University is the only university of Khyber Pakhtunkhwa having highest position of ranking by Higher Education Commission of Pakistan. It has been consistently placed in third position in the field of Computer Science & Information Technology in HEC rankings.

== Campuses ==
Qurtuba University of Science and Information Technology has two campuses. Both are in Khyber Pakhtunkhwa. The main campus is in Dera Ismail Khan and the other is in Peshawar.

== Programs offered ==
Qurtuba University offers following graduate, post graduate and doctorate programs.

=== Five-Year Programs Offered at Qurtuba University ===
- Doctor Of Pharmacy (Pharm-D)
- LLB

=== Bachelor's programs ===
- Bachelor of Business Administration (BBA)
- Bachelor of Commerce (B.Com)
- Bachelor of Education (B.Ed)
- Bachelor of Computer Science
- Bachelor of Science in Electrical Engineering
- Bachelor of Science in Civil Engineering
- Bachelor of Technology in Electrical Technology
- Bachelor of Technology in Civil Technology
- Bachelor of Economics

=== Master programs ===
- Master of Business Administration MBA
- Master of Accounting (M.Com)
- Master of Education (M.Ed)
- Master of Science in Mathematics
- Master of Science Computer Sciences
- Master of Arts in English
- Master of Arts inInternational Relations
- Master of Science in Physics
- Master of Science in Chemistry
- Master of Arts in Political Science

=== MS programs ===
- MS Computer Science
- MS Management Sciences
- MS English

=== M.Phil programs ===
- M.Phil Physics
- M.Phil Education
- M.Phil Economics
- M.Phil International Relations
- M.Phil Political Sciences
- M.Phil Pakistan Studies
- M.Phil Urdu

=== Ph.D programs ===
- Ph.D Management Sciences
- Ph.D International Relations
- Ph.D Political Science
- Ph.D Education
- Ph.D Urdu

=== Diplomas ===
- Diploma in Human Rights
- Diploma in Islamic Banking
- Diploma in Marketing
- Diploma in Human Resource Management (HRM)
- Diploma in Physical Education

=== Certificate ===
- Certificate in Accounting
