= Abdullah Bagh Kili =

- Location within Pakistan
- Coordinates: 32.40°N 69.69°E
- Country: Pakistan
- Territory: Federally Administered Tribal Areas
- Elevation: 1,635 m (5,364 ft)
- Time zone: UTC+5 (PST)
  - Summer (DST): UTC+6 (PDT)

Abdullah Bagh Kili is a town in the Federally Administered Tribal Areas of Pakistan. It is located at 32°24'7N 69°41'20E with an altitude of 1635 metres (5367 feet).
