= Loni (Pashtun tribe) =

Durrani Pashtun tribe

Luni (Pashto: لوني) (also spelled as Loni) is branch of Miana (Pashtun tribe) tribe of Pashtuns, mainly living in Balochistan, Pakistan with its minority in Afghanistan.

Main body of Lunis is to be found in Duki District and a minority living at Sibi (Luni, Balochistan).

“The Lúnis are descended from Miani and are, therefore, connected with the Jáfars of the Músá Khél tahsíl. They designate themselves Durranis, the reason for which may be found in the fact that Miana was a brother of Tarín, the ancestor of the Durranis. Living near the Baloch, and being constantly at feud with them, the Lúnis appear to have adopted the arbitrary distribution of their component groups into large clans or divisions, which is common among the former. The tribe was, therefore, divided into the three main clans Drigzai or Drugzai, Paláo and Rakhanwal. According to local accounts the Lúnis are descended from Laun, Durráni. Originally they were a pastoral tribe and used to come down from Khurásan to graze their flocks in Bagháo, Rarkan, Kingri, etc., returning to Khurasân for the summer. The eldest son of Laun was Shamé Khan, from whom are descended the Shamézais (169) who are the sardár khél or chief's family. After Shamé Khan, the chiefs of the tribe were successively Abbakar Khan, Hatang khan and Haidar Khan. In the time of Ghazi Khán, son of Haidar, a few of the Lúnis remained behind in Rarkan, while in the time of his son and successor Muhammad Khan, the migration back to Khurásan entirely ceased. Muhammad Khan founded the village of Kot Khán Muhammad in Kingri. Muhammad Khán had seven sons, of whom Dost Muhammad migrated to Déra Ghazi Khán, and Pérag Khán commenced cultivation in Rarkun, Rara Sham, etc. The Lúnis came into collision with the Músa Khéls at Hazargat on the Lúni river, and in one of the fights 400 Lúnis were killed when the remainder moved to Chamalang and Nath-ki-chap. Pérag Khan had two sons-Jalal Khan and Páind Khan—and on the former's death Paind Khan became the chief as Samundar Khan, son of Jalal Khan, was a weak man. Paind Khan collected a force of 800 men, and attacked some Marris who were living with the Khétrans. Bábul Khán, Khétrán, claimed the restoration of the property looted, but the Lúnis declined to give it up. In the fighting which ensued the Lúnis were at first successful, but the Khétráns and Marris at length collected in such force that the Lúnis were obliged to retire towards Lakhi. The Lunis are excellent soldiers and fine men. On grand occasions they make a great show of men in armour and of horsemen with tasseled spears. They are not on good terms with Marris.”

“ They built the following forts in Lakhi : Shair-Paind Khan, Shah Gul, Lashkar Khan, Mir Khan, Shair- Sanbat Khan, Aliph Khan, Chimna and Amran.”

“ About 25 years ago (1858) they (Lunis) came to an understanding with the Shadozais (Kakar) and extended their settlements into Chotiali township. The Tarins formerly holding these lands had either disappeared or were arranged with. The Shadozais when they first settled on Thal had been able to draw assistance from the Kakar country, and thus to even more than hold their own against the Marris, but latterly they had grown weaker, and the occupation of Chotiali by the Lunis was therefore an arrangement satisfactory to both the Thal people and Lunis.”

“The Lunis put up the following forts in the Chotiali township :— Shahr Mir Khan, Mahi Khan, Doda Khan, Kaim Khan, Shahr Bisharat Khan, Tali, Musa and Biluch Khan.“

“Paind Khan who was held in great respect by the Lunis was assassinated about five years ago (1878) by Kakars, he had gone to the Kakar country for the purpose of raising an army to co-operate with his own tribe against the Marris, 6 months later the Kakars under Dost Muhammad zhobi attacked the Lunis but were driven off with loss.”

“ Paind Khan had no son and was succeeded by his nephew Samandar Khan, and on the latter's death in 1893 Sardar Nawab Khan became the chief and was given the title of “Khan Bahadur” in 1900. He has abandoned Dewana Shahr (also known as Samundar Khan Shahr) and has now settled in Dhaki, His lands in Lakhi are revenue-free for life, and he and his brother Mir Khan enjoy an annual allowance of 1,050 maunds of grain which was converted into cash (Rs. 2,625) in April 1900. Another man of importance among the Lunis is Makho Khan, Shamezai.” 1907

“The majority of the Lunis are now engaged in agriculture, but some of them such as the Waliani, Marufzai, Mirzai, Lado and Katakhel also combine flock-owning with it.” 1907

== LUNI Country (Duki & Musakhail Districts) ==
“Generally speaking, the Luni country may be said to extend from the Bori valley and Thal plain to the foot of the main eastern branch of the Suleman hills; it thus includes the sources and whole course of the Narechi river, the Chamalang valley, Nath-ki-Chap (Nath Ghar), Girda Kach, a great portion of the Bagao valley, the Rara sham and Rarkan Shams, and the Siren valley. The base of the Hinglun and Kala Pahar range limits them in the east, on the south the Rakhni plain and Butar range of hills closes them in. On the north; the hills limiting the Lakhi plain also separate the Luni from the Hamzazai country. The Musa Khel, Hamzazai (Mekhtar) and Loralai Kakars, with the Tarins and Shadozais of Thal (Duki) lie on their north and west, the Bozdars lie on their east, whilst to their south are the Khetrans of Bagao and Rakni, and the Marris aud Zarkuns of Kohlu. The total area of their nominal territory may be put down as about 1,920 square miles.”

== LUNI-MARRI Wars ==
“ The Hasnis were defeated by the combined Marris and Brahuis and retired to Kohlu, which in those days belonged to the Zarkún Patháns. This was about 1780 A.D. Subsequently another fight ensued at Daola Wanga, when Sadik, the Hasni chief, was killed and the power of the Hasni tribe was completely broken. The place has since been called Sadik Wanga. Sadik's son, however, continued to fight against the Marris and he was assisted by a Luni force, but was again beaten; 58 Hasnis and 38 Lúnis fell, whilst the Marris lost only 17 men. A further attempt resulted in the total destruction of an advanced party of Lúnis under Gul Khán. This defeat resulted in the dispersion of the remainder of the Hasnis.”

“Paind Khan (Luni Chief) collected a force of 800 men, and attacked some Marris who were living with the Khétrans. Bábul Khán, Khétrán, claimed the restoration of the property looted, but the Lúnis declined to give it up. In the fighting which ensued the Lúnis were at first successful, but the Khétráns and Marris at length collected in such force that the Lúnis were obliged to retire towards Lakhi(Luni country).”

”There had been constant disputes and fighting between Lúni and Marri tribes in connection with the grazing on Chamalang plains these culminated in April 1895, in a raid by the Lobaráni-Marris into the Lúni country, when 14 Lúnis were killed. A counter-raid was made by the Lúnis which resulted in the death of 8 Marris. The case was heard by the Quetta shahi jirga and compensation to the amount of Rs. 18,420 was awarded against the Marris, and Rs. 8,800 against the Lúnis. Four Marris and six Lúnis were sentenced to transportation for life, and others of both tribes to shorter terms of imprisonment. The Marri and Lúni chiefs were required to furnish heavy securities for their future good behaviour, and the rate of blood money between the tribes was raised from Rs. 600 to Rs. 1,000.”

“By 1998 Chamalang was in serious trouble with a coal lorry being blown up by a land mine every third day resulting in a death or two. Small arms fire began to be regularly exchanged between the Lunis and the Marris, with occasional use of rocket launchers as well: miners were actually working under a regular battle situation. The Quetta Jirga award of 1994 had come to nothing in less than four uneasy years. In June 2001 another round of arbitration took place in the Punjab-Balochistan border town of Rakhni. While two influential Marri landowners accepted the concessions granted them by the Rakhni Arbitration, there were others who did not and who demanded additional allotments for the entire Bijarani sub-tribe. Twenty days after the accord was signed, conflict broke out once again. When ten days later the smoke cleared, fifty-two good men were dead and twice as many seriously injured with loss of limbs. In order to prevent further bloodshed, the district Nazim of Loralai banned mining activity in Chamalang in July 2002.”

“In 2006, Pakistan Army helped facilitate an agreement between the Lunis and Marris. Resultantly, on December 12, 2006, a tripartite agreement was signed among the Lunis, Marris and mine contractors. Since 2007, when the excavation commenced, 1.5 million tons of coal has been excavated which has generated Rs. 6 billion (US$21 million) in revenues. A total of 500 million tons of coal deposits have been confirmed which worth Rs. 2000 billion (US$6.9 billion).”

== Population ==
As of 1998 Loni had largest population in the Pashtun tribes.

== Notable members ==
- Arman Loni
- Wranga Loni
- Late Sardar Muhammad Tahir Khan Luni
- Sardar Masood Ali Khan Luni
- Sardar Khusdil Khan Luni
- Tumandar Sardar Asmatullah Khan Luni
- Sardar Hafeez khan Luni
