= Musakhel District, Pakistan =

Coordinates: 30.919°N 69.86°E

Musakhel District ضلع موسی‌ خیل موسی خېل ولسوالۍ موسی خݔل دمگ
- District of Balochistan
- Map of Balochistan with Musakhel District highlighted
- Country: Pakistan
- Province: Balochistan
- Division: Loralai
- Headquarters: Musakhel Bazar

Government
  - Type: District Administration
  - Deputy Commissioner: Muhammad Bilal Shabir
  - District Chairman: Sardar Alam Khan (PTI)
  - District Vice Chairman: Rehmat Jan (Independent)

Area
  - District of Balochistan: 5,728 km^{2} (2,212 sq mi)

Population (2023)
  - District of Balochistan: 182,275
  - Density: 31.82/km^{2} (82.42/sq mi)
  - Urban: 15,805
  - Rural: 166,470

Literacy
  - Literacy rate: Total: (36.60%); Male: (47.50%); Female: (24.72%)
- Time zone: UTC+5 (PST)
- Area code: Post Code : 84700

Musakhel (Urdu: ضلع موسی‌خیل) is a district in the northeast of the Balochistan province of Pakistan. It became a separate district in 1992, prior to which it was a tehsil within Loralai District. Musakhel District is now part of Loralai Division, which was created after splitting Zhob Division.

== History ==
After the first phase of the Afghan war of 1878-79 AD, the British took control of the northern areas of Balochistan under the Treaty of Gandamak. During 1879-84 AD, efforts were made to extend the British influence over the Khetrans and Musakhels of the, now Musakhel, territory. The Musakhels took part in outrages committed by the Kakars under Shah Jahan in 1884, but surrendered to the British government on the conclusion of the expedition in the same year. On 1 November 1887, the whole area was declared part of British India. Zhob agency was formed in 1890 and Musakhel territory was annexed to it. Musakhel was made a tehsil in 1892 and was transferred to Loralai district in October 1903.

In 1905, the Musakhel tehsil comprised 61 villages and the total population, according to 1901 census, was 15,537 (8,374 males and 7,163 females). The principal tribes represented were Afghan, who included: Isot (1,941); Jafar (1,026); Panri (10,144) including the Musakhel clan (9,748) the principal divisions of which were the Belkhel (7,662) and Laharzai (2,086); and Syed Gharshin (271). The chief language spoken was Pushto. Musakhel remained a tehsil of Loralai district till 1 January 1992 when it was notified as a district as a result of splitting Loralai district into 3 districts, Loralai, Musakhel, and Barkhan.

== Geography ==
Musakhel District is located in the north-east of Balochistan and borders Khyber Pakhtunkhwa to the north and Dera Ghazi Khan, Punjab to the east. The district comprises an area of 5,728km². The headquarters of the district is Musakhel Bazar.

=== Climate ===
The climate of Musakhel, located 1,200–2,400 metres above sea level, is semi-arid and subtropical. During summer, the region experiences monsoon showers and high heat, with mean temperatures ranging from 21 °C to 32 °C. June is the hottest month with maximum temperatures exceeding 38 °C.

Summer is longer than winter and lasts for about 7 months (April–October). In winter the temperature drops below 21 °C, but in the coolest month (January) the mean monthly temperature drops below 10 °C. The mercury may touch the freezing point during cold spells. Some areas of Musakhel also receives snowfall in winter like Kingri and Rarasham.

== Administrative divisions ==
The district of Musakhel is divided into five Tehsils:

Tehsil	Area (km²)	Pop. (2023)	Density (ppl/km²) (2023)	Literacy rate (2023)	Union Councils
Drug Tehsil	301	21,792	72.40	65.37%	...
Kingri Tehsil	3,683	33,618	9.13	45.37%	...
Musakhel Tehsil	658	49,809	75.70	34.51%	...
Tiyar Essot Tehsil	...	...	...	24.71%	...
Toisar Tehsil	539	56,818	105.41	26.06%	...

== Demographics ==
=== Population ===
Historical population
Year	Pop.	±% p.a.
1951	...	—
1961	24,320	—
1972	38,547	+4.28%
1981	91,174	+10.04%
1998	134,056	+2.29%
2017	167,243	+1.17%
2023	182,275	+1.44%

According to 2023 census, the district had a population of 182,275, with a population density of 31.82/km².

=== Religion ===
In the 2023 census, 494 (0.27%) people in the district were from religious minorities.

Languages of Musakhel district (2023)
1. Pashto (85.8%)
2. Balochi (12.0%)
3. Others (2.17%)

=== Language ===
At the time of the 2023 census, 85.83% of the population spoke Pashto and 12% Balochi as their first language.

== Education ==
Musakhel District is ranked at the 81st position in the education score index of the Pakistan District Education Rankings 2017 published by Alif Ailaan. The education score is composed of the learning score, retention score and gender parity score. Retention is one of the biggest concerns in this district, with the relevant score being only 43.79 out of a potential 100. While, gender parity and learning scores lying a little above average. There has been only a slight improvement in the provision of post primary school infrastructure, with government primary schools still accounting for over 80% of the total number of government schools in the province, with a score of 27.87.

In a recent District Education Performance Index DEPIx published by the Planning Commission of Pakistan, Musakhel's overall average falls within the 45-50 range, indicating low performance.

In percentage terms, the allocations for education in Baluchistan have seen the highest growth compared to all other provinces during the 2013–2018 tenure, including district Musakhel. According to the National Education Management Information System data 2016–2017, the structural and governance reforms have yet to create an impact in terms of better provision of school infrastructure to students and teachers of all districts in Baluchistan.

Issues reported by the residents via the Taleem Do! App complain of the lack or absenteeism of teachers.

== Recreational places ==
Musakhel district features locations with potential for tourism, the region characterised by meadows and green valleys, which attract visitors from neighbouring districts, particularly in summer. Behu, in Drug Tehsil, is a notable picnic spot.

== See also ==
- Burg pusht
- Mizri Ghar
- Districts of Pakistan
  - Districts of Khyber Pakhtunkhwa, Pakistan
  - Districts of Punjab, Pakistan
  - Districts of Balochistan, Pakistan
  - Districts of Sindh, Pakistan
  - Districts of Azad Kashmir
  - Districts of Gilgit-Baltistan

== Bibliography ==
- 1998 District Census report of Musakhel. Census publication. Vol. 81. Islamabad: Population Census Organization, Statistics Division, Government of Pakistan. 2000.
