= Gomal University =

Public University in Dera Ismail Khan, Pakistan

- جامعہ گومل
- Logo of Gomal University
- Other name: GU
- Motto in English: University at Glance
- Type: Public
- Established: 1974; 52 years ago
- Chancellor: Governor of Khyber Pakhtunkhwa
- Vice-Chancellor: Prof. Dr Muhammad Tahir Khalily
- Provost: Prof. Dr Sami Ullah
- Director: Dr. Ameer Atta, director of Distance Education
- Academic staff: 335 (registered professors)
- Administrative staff: 384
- Students: 20000
- Postgraduates: 485
- Doctoral students: 289
- Other students: 37
- Location: Dera Ismail Khan, Khyber Pakhtunkhwa, Pakistan; 31°49′N 70°55′E
- Colours: Aero and green
- Website: www.gu.edu.pk

Gomal University (Urdu: جامعہ گومل) is a public research university located in Dera Ismail Khan, Khyber Pakhtunkhwa, Pakistan. Founded and established in 1974, the university is one of the older institutions in the province and occupies one of the largest campuses in the Khyber Pakhtunkhwa province.

Gomal University offers a wide range of courses at the undergraduate, postgraduate, and doctoral levels, besides research degree programs in most of the departments. It consists of four faculties of science, with a strong emphasis on natural and medical sciences courses. Gomal University is affiliated with the Higher Education Commission and the National Testing Service.

The university was founded by Prime Minister Zulfikar Ali Bhutto, and the donation came from Nawab Allah Nawaz Khan, who donated a large area of his land for the establishment of the university. Nawab Allah Nawaz was also Gomal University's first vice-chancellor in 1974.

Dr. Zafar Iqbal is the current vice-chancellor.

== History ==
Gomal University was established as a chartered and co-educational university. The university is the 12th oldest university in terms of HEC's seniority listings. The university was founded by Prime Minister Zulfikar Ali Bhutto who laid the establishment of Gomal University in D.I.Khan, Khyber-Pakhtunkhwa Province. Prime Minister Bhutto laid down the foundation stone of Gomal University on 1 May 1974, putting forward his educational policy of highly educated Pakistan to meet the challenges of the modern world in every aspect of life. Donations and land were provided by Nawab Allah Nawaz Khan, who served as the university's first and founding vice-chancellor. Nawaz Khan donated 11000 Kn agricultural land to the establishment of the university.

The Act No. X of 1974 provides the constitutional establishment of the university as a public research university categorization of the Ministry of Education. The post-graduate schools of Physics, Mathematics, Chemistry, States, and Economics were founded in 1974. The business school and the school of mass communication were founded in 1974 as well. In 1975, the Department of Pharmacy started its classes. The faculty of agriculture was established and began its classes in December 1979.

== Academics ==
=== Institute of Engineering and Technology ===
The Institute of Engineering and Technology of Gomal University grants Bachelor of Science degrees in tele-systems, electronics, and telecommunications engineering disciplines. The school also awards a Master of Science degree in Telecommunications Network. Gomal University also grants undergraduate degrees in law. The institute also awards bachelor's degrees in the following disciplines:

- Bachelor of Science
  - Computer Science
  - Information Technology
  - Electronics Engineering
  - Telecommunications Engineering
  - Biotechnology

In 2003, Abdul Qadeer Khan helped the university financially in building an auditorium that was named after him.

=== Gomal University Law College ===
The Law College is one of the constituent colleges of Gomal University dedicated to the promotion of legal education. The Law College grants the LLB degree and it consisted of 11 registered faculty members in the Law college.

=== Gomal College of Veterinary Sciences ===
The Gomal College of Veterinary Sciences was established as the Institute of Animal Husbandry and Veterinary Sciences. The college grants Master of Philosophy and Doctor of Veterinary Medicine academic degrees. The college is under the jurisprudence of the Ministry of Food Agriculture and Livestock.

=== Graduate schools and departments ===
The university offers master programmes in physics, chemistry, mathematics, economics, and biological science. The research on physics began in 1974 after the physics department gained independence from Peshawar University the following year. Earlier, the Physics Department was established in the Government Post-Graduate College (GPGC) under the University of Peshawar in 1968 and was transferred to Gomal University in 1974. During the same time, scientist Abdul Qadeer Khan joined the research faculty and briefly taught physics courses as a visiting professor. Gomal University focuses its research and development in radiation physics, particle physics, plasma physics, and computational physics (as well as Monte Carlo integration).

== Degrees offered ==
Gomal University offers the following degrees:

=== Bachelors ===
- Bachelor of Computer Science
- Bachelor in Information Technology
- Bachelor of Science (Telecommunication Engineering)
- Bachelor of Business Administration
- Bachelor of Commerce (Hons)
- Bachelor of Education
- Pharm.D
- Doctor of Veterinary Medicine
- Bachelor of Science (Biotechnology)
- Bachelor of Science Medical Emergency Care Technology
- Bachelor of Science Dental Technology
- Bachelor of Science Medical Lab Technology
- Bachelor of Science anesthesia Technology
- Bachelor of Science Surgical Technology
- Bachelor of Science Medical imaging Technology
- Doctor Of Physical therapy

==== Postgraduate ====
- Master of Science in Journalism and Mass Communication
- Master of Computer Science
- Master of Science in Health and Physical Education
- Master of Science in Biology
- Master of Science in Chemistry (world)
- Master of Science in Economics
- Master of Science in Mathematics
- Master of Science in Physics
- Master of Science in Statistics
- Master of Arts in Islamic Studies
- Master of Business Administration
- Master of Arts in Pak Studies
- Master of Business Administration (Banking & Finance)
- Master of Commerce
- Master of Education
- Master of Arts (English)
- Master in Public Administration
- Master in Public Health
- LLB

== Sexual harassment scandals ==
In 2020, multiple women, including students and faculty, accused Professor Hafiz Salahuddin of sexual misconduct. The university fired him after allegations of sexual harassment against him were proven.

In 2021, Assistant Professor Muhammad Zubair of Political Science was fired after allegations of sexual harassment against him were proven.

== See also ==
- List of Islamic educational institutions
