= Takht-e-Sulaiman =

Peak of the Sulaiman Mountains in Khyber Pakhtunkhwa, Pakistan

- Location within Pakistan

Highest point
- Elevation: 3,487 m (11,440 ft)
- Prominence: 1,775 m (5,823 ft)
- Listing: List of mountains in Pakistan
- Coordinates: 31°40′57.66″N 69°56′11.64″E

Geography
- Location: Pakistan
- Parent range: Sulaiman Mountains

Takht-e-Sulaiman (Note: Urdu: تَختِ سلیمان; Pashto: تخت سليمان, Balochi: تخت ء سلیمان) (lit. 'Throne of Solomon') is a peak of the Sulaiman Mountains, located near the town of Darazinda in the Dera Ismail Khan Subdivision of Khyber Pakhtunkhwa, Pakistan. It is close to Dera Ismail Khan Subdivision's borders with both South Waziristan and Zhob, Balochistan. At 3,487 metres (11,440 ft), it is the highest peak in Dera Ismail Khan District.

== In mythology ==
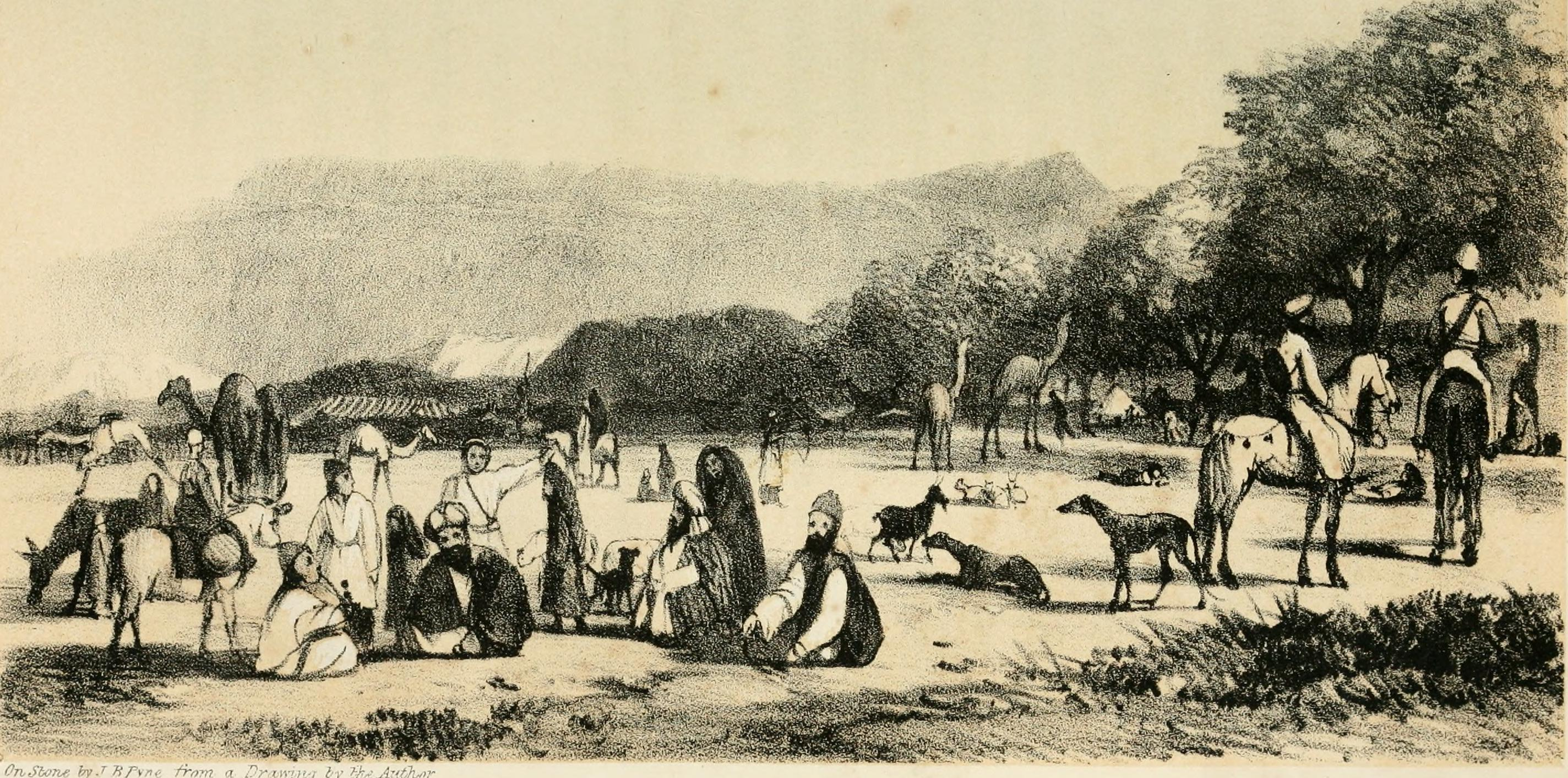
View of the Takht-e-Sulaiman Mountain seen from Derabund in the 19th century

Ibn Battuta named Takht-e-Sulaiman as Kōh-e Sulaymān, "Mount of Solomon". A legend, recorded by him, has it that Prophet Solomon climbed this mountain and looked out over the land of Hindustan, which was then "covered with darkness". After staying on the peak, he turned back without descending into this new frontier, and so the peak got named after him.

According to the Pashtun mythology, Qais Abdur Rashid, said to be the legendary ancestor of the Pashtun people, is buried on top of Takht-e-Sulaiman, which gives the peak the local Pashto name of Da Kasī Ghar (د کسي غر, "Mountain of Qais").

== Tourism ==
Takht-e-Sulaiman is surrounded by olive groves and pine-nut (chalghoza) forests, and hosts wild animals like markhors, wolves, rabbits, eagles and partridges. Royalty from the Gulf Arab states are known to hunt precious birds in the region.
