= Dera Ismail Khan District =

District sub-division in Pakistan

Coordinates: 32°00′N 70°30′E

Dera Ismail Khan District ضلع ڈیره اسماعیل خان
- District of Khyber Pakhtunkhwa
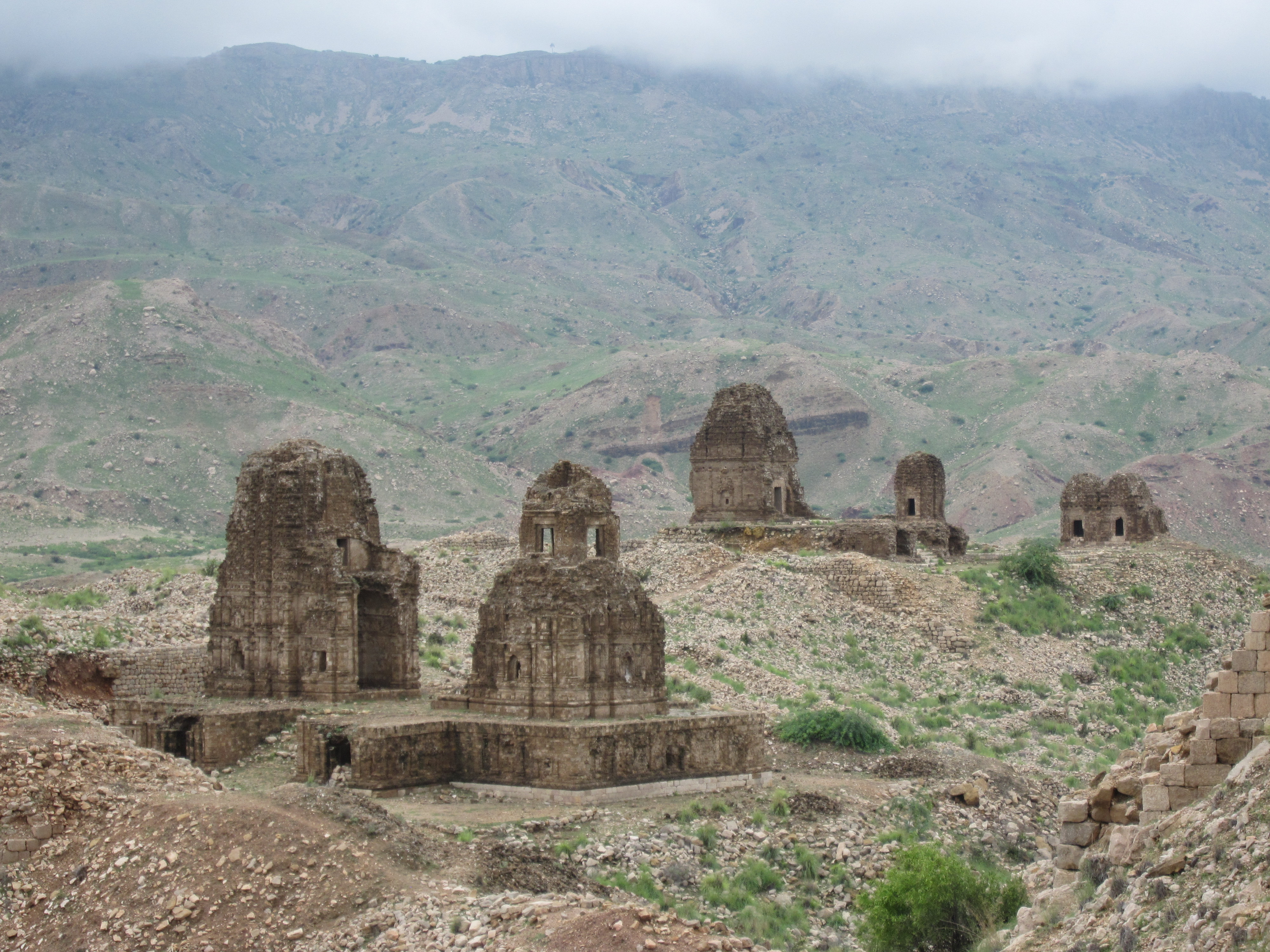
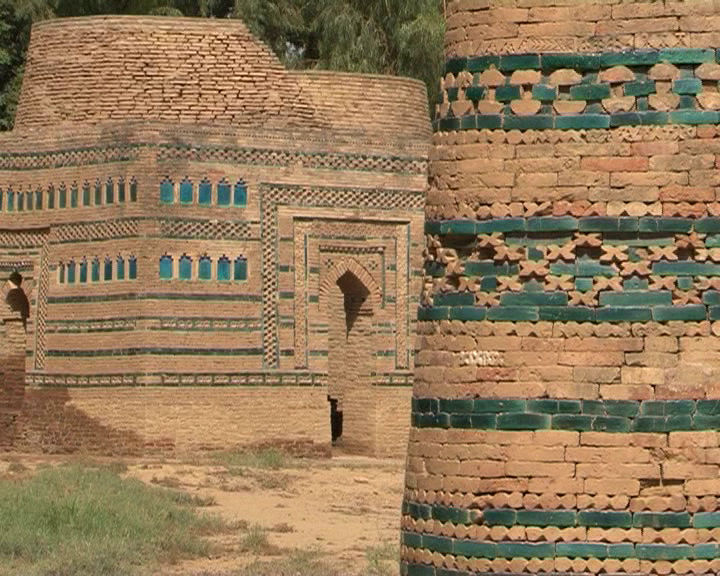
- Top: Hindu temple ruins at Kafir Kot; Bottom: Lal Marah Tombs

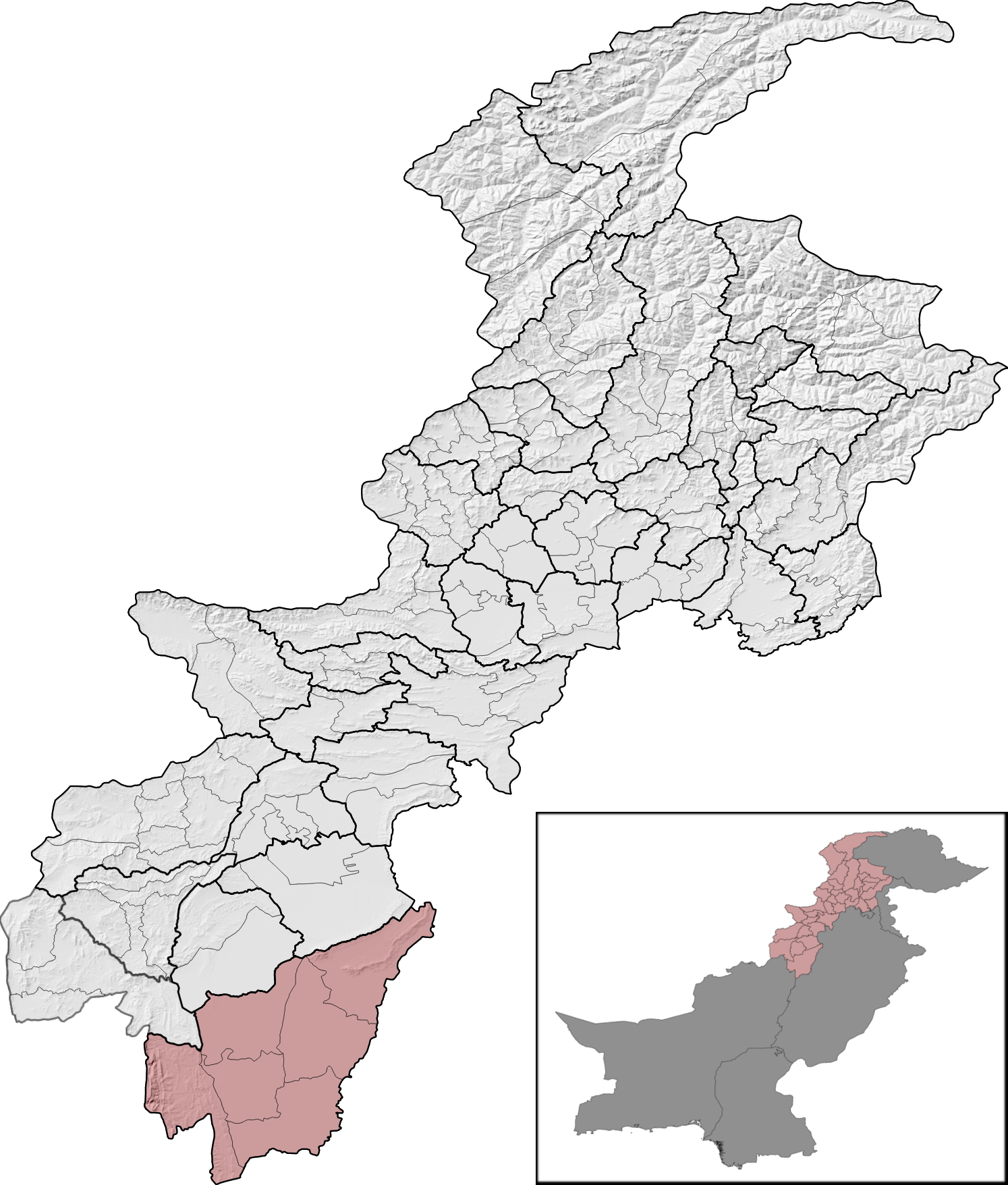
- Dera Ismail Khan District (red) in Khyber Pakhtunkhwa
- Country: Pakistan
- Province: Khyber Pakhtunkhwa
- Division: Dera Ismail Khan
- Established: 1849; 177 years ago
- Founder: British Raj
- Headquarters: Dera Ismail Khan
- Tehsils of Dera Ismail Khan District: 05

Government
  - Type: Government of Khyber Pakhtunkhwa
  - Deputy Commissioner: Abdul Nasir Khan
  - Constituency: NA-44 Dera Ismail Khan-I
  - National Assembly Member: Faisal Amin Khan Gandapur (Pakistan Tehreek-e-Insaf)

Area
  - Total: 9,334 km^{2} (3,604 sq mi)
- Elevation: 165 m (541 ft)

Population (2023 Pakistani census)
  - Total: 4,193,456
  - Density: 449.3/km^{2} (1,164/sq mi)

Literacy
  - Literacy rate: Total: 46.58%; Male: 58.14%; Female: 33.71%
- Time zone: UTC+05:00 (PKT)
  - Summer (DST): DST is not observed
- ZIP Code: 29111
- NWD (area) code: 966
- ISO 3166 code: PK-KP

Dera Ismail Khan District (Urdu and Saraiki: ضلع ڈیره اسماعیل خان, Pashto: دېره اسماعيل خان ولسوالۍ), often abbreviated as D.I. Khan is a district in the Dera Ismail Khan Division of the Khyber Pakhtunkhwa province of Pakistan. The capital of the district is the town of Dera Ismail Khan. The district has an area of 9,334 km^{2} (3,604 sq mi) and a population of 1,822,916 as of the 2023 Census. After the Second Anglo-Sikh War in 1849 the district (which was then part of the Punjab) was annexed by the East India Company and then became part of British India. In 1901 the district became part of the North-West Frontier Province when the province was created from the North-western territories of the Punjab. This province was later renamed to Khyber Pakhtunkhwa and Dera Ismail Khan is now one of its 38 districts.

== Geography ==
The district of Dera Ismail Khan is bounded on the North east by the Bhakkar and Dera Ghazi Khan districts of Punjab. Eastern portions of the district along the Indus river are characterized by fertile alluvial plains, while lands farther from the river consist of clay soil cut by ravines from rainfall. The district is bounded on the southwest by a thin strip of the South Waziristan district, which separates D.I Khan from the Koh-e-Sulaiman mountain in the neighboring Baluchistan province. In the northwest is the Tank District.

D.I Khan is separated from the Marwat plains of the Lakki Marwat district by a spur of clay and sandstone hills that stretch east from the Sulaiman mountains to the Indus river known as the Sheikh Badin Hills.

The highest peak in the range is the limestone Sheik Badin mountain, which is protected by the Sheikh Badin National Park. Near the Indus River is a spur of limestone hills known as the Kafir Kot hills, where the ancient Hindu complex of Kafir Kot is located. DI Khan is also considered the center of Pakistan because of its location between Bhakkar, Mianwali of North Punjab, Zhob of Balochistan and South Waziristan of Pakistan's tribal belt.

== History ==
=== Etymology ===
It is named after Dodai mercenary Ismail Khan, son of Malik Sohrab Dodai of the Langah Sultanate of Multan, who laid the foundation of the area.

=== Ancient history ===
The Dera Ismail Khan District is littered with ruins from ancient civilizations. Dera Ismail Khan is home to the collection of Hindu ruins from two separate sites 20 miles apart, jointly known as Kafir Kot.

The region came under the influence of the Nanda empire of the ancient India from 300 BCE. With the rise of Chandragupta Maurya, the region came under the complete control of the Mauryan empire. Afterward, the region was briefly and nominally controlled by the Shunga empire. However, with the decline of the Shungas, the region passed to local Hindu and Buddhist rulers and was interrupted by foreign rulers. Many of these foreign rulers, like the Indo-Parthians, Sakas, and Kushans converted to Hinduism and Buddhism and promoted these Indian religions throughout central and south Asia.

With the decline of the imperial Guptas, the Hindu Shahis came to rule the area. The Hindu Shahis built two massive forts in the northern edges of Dera Ismail Khan. The forts were later renamed as "Kafir kots" (forts of the Kuffar (Disbelievers)). These Hindu Shahi forts were known for high towers and steep defensive walls. The Hindus also built many Hindu temples around the area. However, many of them are now in rubble. The Hindu Shahis remained in control of the area until their defeat by the Turkic Muslim army of Ghaznavids.

The district is part of what was historically territory inhabited by the Baloch people during the medieval India, who were invited to settle in the region by Shah Husseyn of the Langah Sultanate of Multan. These Baloch settlers were displaced by or assimilated into later waves of the Pashtun settlement.

=== British era ===
Dera Ismail Khan district was annexed by the British from its former Sikh rulers after the Second Anglo-Sikh War of 1848–1849. Dera Ismail Khan was created as an administrative unit of the British India, part of the Derajat Division of the North-West Frontier Province (now Khyber Pakhtunkhwa). It was formerly divided into almost two equal portions by the Indus river which intersected it from north to south. To the west of the Indus, the characteristics of the country resembled those of Dera Ghazi Khan. To the east of the present bed of the river, there is a wide track known as the Kachi, exposed to river action. Beyond this, the country rises abruptly, and a barren, almost desert plain stretches eastwards, sparsely cultivated, and inhabited by nomadic tribes.

In 1901, the trans-Indus tract was allotted to the newly formed North-West Frontier Province, the cis-Indus tract remaining in the Punjab jurisdiction. The cis-Indus portions of the Dera Ismail Khan and the Bannu districts now comprise the new Punjab district of Mianwali. Wheat and wool were exported. In 1901, it contained an area of 8,814 km^{2} (3,403 sq mi) and a population of 252,379. In 1947, it became part of the newly independent State of Pakistan.

=== Modern era ===
In 2016, 191,000 acres in the district were brought under cultivation with completion of the Gomal Zam dam, and a series of irrigation canals partially funded by the United States Government.

In 2026, a bombing at a wedding left seven dead, and 25 others injured.

== Demography ==
=== Population ===
Historical population
Year	Pop.	±% p.a.
1972	430,051	—
1981	550,256	+2.78%
1998	891,985	+2.88%
2017	1,693,594	+3.43%
2023	1,829,811	+1.30%

As of the 2023 census, Dera Ismail Khan district has 270,021 households and a population of 1,829,811. The district has a sex ratio of 110.24 males to 100 females and a literacy rate of 46.58%: 58.14% for males and 33.71% for females. 559,401 (30.69% of the surveyed population) are under 10 years of age. 374,757 (20.48%) live in urban areas.

=== Language ===
Languages of Dera Ismail Khan District (2023 Pakistani census)
1. Saraiki (65.8%)
2. Pashto (32.0%)
3. Urdu (1.70%)
4. Punjabi (0.30%)
5. Others (0.51%)

Saraiki are main ethnic groups in Dera Ismail Khan District in simple majority. Total population of DI Khan District is 1,822,916 consists of Males 956,098 & females 866,667 as of 2023 Pakistani census.

There are 1,198,862 Saraiki, 582,703 Pashto, 31,152 Urdu, 4,765 Punjabi, 863 Sindhi, 791 Balochi, 490 Kashmiri, 2,738 Hindko, 5 Brahui, 18 Shina, 2 Balti, 3 Kalasha & 524 others of total 1,822,916 speakers

=== Religion ===
Religion in contemporary Dera Ismail Khan District
Religious group	1941		2017		2023	
Religious group	Pop.	%	Pop.	%	Pop.	%
Islam	205,910	84.92%	1,690,436	99.81%	1,816,418	99.64%
Hinduism	33,888	13.98%	642	0.04%	717	0.04%
Sikhism	2,000	0.82%	—N/a	—N/a	58	~0%
Christianity	195	0.08%	2,278	0.13%	5,645	0.31%
Other	474	0.20%	238	0.02%	78	0.01%
Total Population	242,467	100%	1,693,594	100%	1,822,916 (Note: Different from official population figure since it excludes sensitive areas where religion was not asked)	100%
Note: 1941 census data is for Dera Ismail Khan and Kulachi tehsils of erstwhile Dera Ismail Khan district, which roughly corresponds to contemporary Dera Ismail Khan district, excluding the former Frontier Region Dera Ismail Khan. District and tehsil borders have changed since 1941.

Religious groups in Dera Ismail Khan District (British North-West Frontier Province era)
Religious group	1881		1891		1901		1911		1921		1931		1941	
Religious group	Pop.	%	Pop.	%	Pop.	%	Pop.	%	Pop.	%	Pop.	%	Pop.	%
Islam	385,244	87.23%	420,189	86.42%	218,338	86.51%	224,992	87.85%	218,315	83.72%	235,707	86%	255,757	85.79%
Hinduism	54,446	12.33%	62,961	12.95%	29,434	11.66%	28,617	11.17%	39,311	15.08%	35,822	13.07%	39,167	13.14%
Sikhism	1,691	0.38%	2,840	0.58%	4,362	1.73%	2,175	0.85%	1,904	0.73%	1,878	0.69%	2,390	0.8%
Christianity	253	0.06%	204	0.04%	230	0.09%	336	0.13%	1,237	0.47%	657	0.24%	810	0.27%
Zoroastrianism	13	0%	7	0%	0	0%	0	0%	0	0%	0	0%	0	0%
Jainism	2	0%	0	0%	15	0.01%	0	0%	0	0%	0	0%	1	0%
Buddhism	0	0%	0	0%	0	0%	0	0%	0	0%	0	0%	5	0%
Judaism	—N/a	—N/a	0	0%	0	0%	0	0%	0	0%	0	0%	1	0%
Others	0	0%	0	0%	0	0%	0	0%	0	0%	0	0%	0	0%
Total population	441,649	100%	486,201	100%	252,379	100%	256,120	100%	260,767	100%	274,064	100%	298,131	100%
Note1: British North-West Frontier Province era district borders are not an exact match in the present-day due to various bifurcations to district borders — which since created new districts — throughout the region during the post-independence era that have taken into account population increases. Note2: Population decrease noted between 1891 census and 1901 census due to the creation of British North-West Frontier Province, bifurcating from British Punjab province. The trans-Indus tract of Dera Ismail Khan district was allotted to the newly formed North-West Frontier Province, the cis-Indus tract remaining in the Punjab jurisdiction. The cis-Indus portions of the Dera Ismail Khan and the Bannu districts would comprise the new Punjab district of Mianwali.

== Education ==
The Dera Ismail Khan district has many schools and colleges, predominantly in the capital of Dera Ismail Khan.

- University of Agriculture, Dera Ismail Khan
- Gomal University- Two campuses in Dera Ismail Khan
- Qurtuba University
- Gomal Medical College
- University Wensam College
- Dar-e-Arqam School, Dera Ismail Khan
- The City School, Dera Ismail Khan
- Beaconhouse School System
- Overseas Pakistan Foundation School]
- Educare School
- Knowledge Home
- Islamabad Schools
- Mufti Mehmood Public School & College
- Elite Education System, Haleemia Colony, Eid Gah Kalan, Dera Ismail Khan
- St. Helen's High School & College
- Shawn School & College Paharpur
- Iqra Science School & College Paharpur
- Punjab College Meraj Campus
- Government College of Technology, Dera Ismail Khan campus
- The Educators Dikhan campus

== Politics ==
The district is represented in the National Assembly by two elected MNAs who represent the following constituencies:

Constituency	MNA	Party
NA-24	Fazal-ur-Rehman	Jamiat Ulama-e-Islam (F)
NA-39	Muhammad Yaqoob Shiekh	PTI

=== Provincial Assembly ===
Member of Provincial Assembly	Party affiliation	Constituency	Year	Area
Ehtisham Javed	Independent	PK-95 Dera Ismail Khan-I	2018	Paharpur/Paniyala
Ahmad Kundi	Pakistan Peoples Party Parliamentarians	PK-96 Dera Ismail Khan-II	2018	D.I.Khan North
Faisal Amin Khan	Pakistan Tehreek-e-Insaf	PK-97 Dera Ismail Khan-III	2018	D.I.Khan city
Lutf ur Rahman	Muttahida Majlis-e-Amal	PK-98 Dera Ismail Khan-IV	2018	Paroa Tehsil
Aghaz Ikram Ullah Gandapur	Pakistan Tehreek-e-Insaf	PK-99 Dera Ismail Khan-V	2018	Kulachi, Draban, FR DIK

== Cuisine and food ==
Sobat is a traditional dish predominantly prepared in the capital of Dera Ismail Khan. It consists of chicken, onions, garlic, tomatoes, khusk dhania, garam masala, turmeric, and other spices. It is usually eaten as dinner. Sobat is known all over Pakistan, and brings a lot of attention to the district and the city.

== Sports ==
Football is a very popular game in Dera Ismail Khan. Other games including cricket, hockey, badminton, and many more are played as well. Ali Amin Khan has also provided a platform for more involvement in sports in this region. In 2017, he introduced a tennis ball cricket league, named Dera Premier League, and the teams from different geographical regions of Pakistan competed. Season two was held in 2018. DPL became Pakistan's biggest tape ball cricket tournament.

Dera Ismail Khan has a cricket team as well: Dera Ismail Khan cricket team. Some cultural games (kabaddi, mailay and kodi, which is played by three sportsmen called pehlwaan where one runs while two other have to catch him in a big circular ground encircled by spectators) are still popular among native Saraiki people and have been for decades.

== Administration ==
The district is subdivided into five Tehsils which are divided into Union Councils:

Tehsil	Name (Urdu)	Name (Pashto)	Area (km²)	Pop. (2023)	Density (ppl/km²) (2023)	Literacy rate (2023)	Union Councils
Daraban Tehsil	تحصیل درابن	درابن تحصیل	1,540	149,447	97.04	26.89%	
Drazanda Tehsil	(Urdu: تحصیل درازندہ)	(Pashto: درازنده تحصیل)	2,008	82,386	41.03	28.67%	
Dera Ismail Khan Tehsil	(Urdu: تحصیل ڈیره اسماعیل خان)	(Pashto: دېره اسماعيل خان تحصیل)	1,167	767,979	658.08	56.97%	
Kulachi Tehsil	(Urdu: تحصیل کلاچی)	(Pashto: کلاچی تحصیل)	1,229	102,595	83.48	30.29%	
Paroa Tehsil	(Urdu: تحصیل پرووا)	(Pashto: پرووا تحصیل)	1,733	320,937	185.19	35.56%	

== See also ==
- Abdullah Bagh Kili
- National Assembly of Pakistan
- Districts of Pakistan
  - District of Khyber Pakhtunkhwa
- Sport in Pakistan
- President of Pakistan
- Arif Alvi
- Pakistani cuisine
