= Sulaiman Mountains =

Mountain range in Afghanistan and Pakistan

- Urdu: سليمان پہاڑی سلسلہ; Pashto: د سلیمان غرونہ; Balochi: کوهِ سليمان;Dari: سلسله کوه های سلیمان
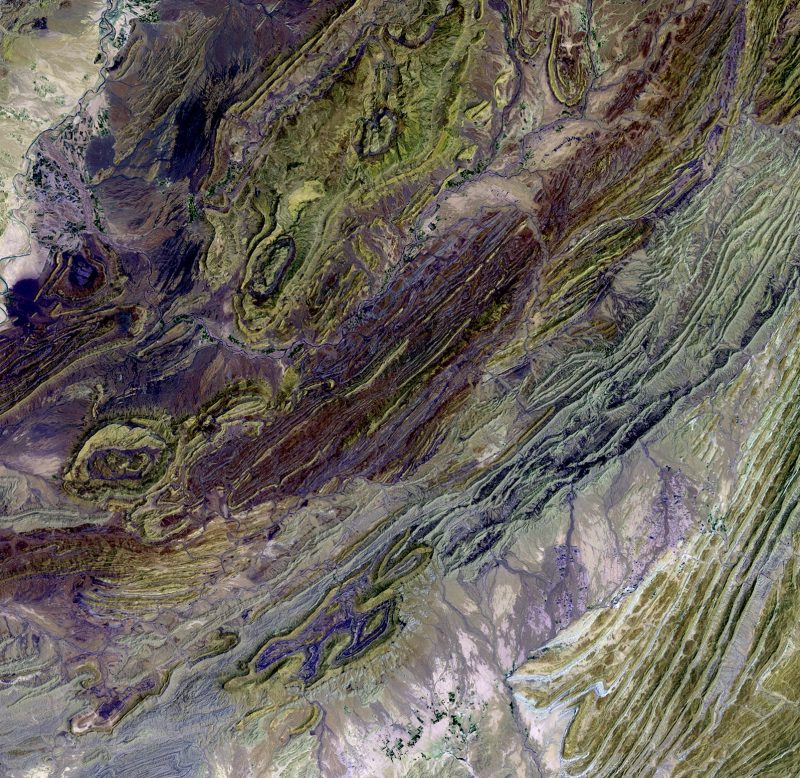
- Satellite image of a part of the Sulaiman Range

Highest point
- Coordinates: 30°30′N 70°10′E

Geography
- Location within Balochistan, Pakistan Location within Pakistan
- Location: Afghanistan and Pakistan
- Parent range: Hindu Kush

The Sulaiman Mountain Range is a north–south extension of the southern Hindu Kush mountain system in western Pakistan and eastern Afghanistan. They rise to form the eastern edge of the Iranian plateau. They extend from northeastern Afghanistan into southwestern Pakistan, bordering the plains of the Indus River Valley to the east. To the north are the arid highlands of the Central Hindu Kush whose heights extend up to 3,383 m (11,099 ft). Together with the Central Brahui Range in Balochistan Province and Kirthar Mountains on the border between Balochistan and Sindh Province, the Sulaiman Mountains form the Sulaiman-Kirthar geologic province.

The highest and best-known peak of the main Sulaiman Range is the twin-peaked Takht-e-Sulaiman at 3,487 m (11,440 ft), located near Darazinda in Dera Ismail Khan. The highest peak in the Sulaiman Mountains subrange is Koh-i-Zarghun at 3,578 m (11,739 ft) near Quetta, located in the Central Brahui Range. The next highest peak in Balochistan Province is Khilafat Hill at 3,475 m (11,401 ft), also located in Central Brahui Range in the Ziarat District of Pakistan, and is famous for the Ziarat Juniper Forest, where Juniperus macropoda trees grow.

== Geography ==
The Sulaiman Range extends from the Kandahar, Zabul and Paktia provinces in Afghanistan across Waziristan and Kurram districts of Khyber Pakhtunkhwa, northern Balochistan, and southwestern Punjab in Pakistan. In Afghanistan, the western edge of the range starts just beyond the northern Paktia province where they meet the Koh-i-Baba range. South from there, they meet the Spin Ghar range northeast of Gardez in Paktia province, but towards west, the mountain range drops gradually in Kandahar southwest into Helmand and the Sistan Basin.

In Punjab the mountains extend into the Dera Ghazi Khan, Taunsa and Rajanpur districts, located west of the Indus River on the boundary with Balochistan. The eastern edge of the Sulaiman range runs 280 miles (450 km) from the Gomal Pass in Pakistan's Khyber Pakhtunkhwa to near the city of Jacobabad in Sindh, and further stretches into south-west Punjab.

The Sulaiman Range, and the high plateaus to the west of it, helps form a natural barrier against the humid winds that blow from the Indian Ocean, creating arid conditions across southern and central Afghanistan to the west and north. In contrast, the relatively flat and low-lying Indus delta is situated due east and south of the Sulaimans.

Rivers that drain the Sulaimans include the Gomal River which flows eastward into the Indus River, and the Dori River and other small tributaries of the Arghandab River, which flow southwestward into the Helmand River.

== Geology ==
The Sulaimans were formed as a fold and thrust belt as the Indian Plate collided into Eurasian Plate beginning about 30 million years ago. The Indian Plate's counter-clockwise rotation as it collided with the Eurasian Plate resulted in the Sulaimans having some of the most complex tectonic structures in the world, including "stacking" of thrust faults. The complex fault-system is capable of producing doublet earthquakes that jump to other faults — such as the 1997 Harnai earthquake in which a magnitude 7.1 earthquake triggered a 6.8 earthquake 19 seconds later on a second fault 50 kilometres away.

Areas in the southern part of the range include an Imbricate fan of slices of rocks in close parallel, bounded by faults on either side of each slice. Along the Eastern edge of the Sulaimans is the Sulaiman Fold, an area within the Indian Plate consisting of sediment, alongside which runs the Ornach Nal-Ghazaband-Chaman Fault.

== In mythology ==
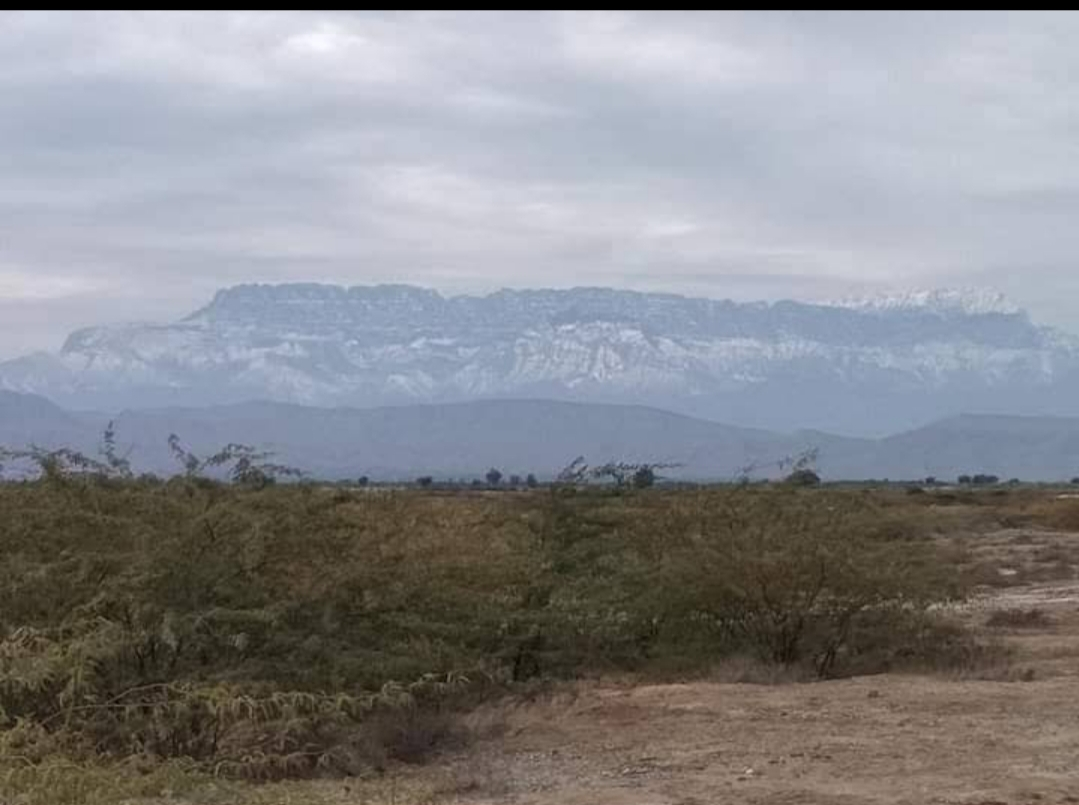
A view of Takht-e-Sulaiman from Kulachi tehsil

One of the highest peaks of the range, the Takht-e-Sulaiman ("Throne of Solomon") at 3,487 m (11,440 ft) high, was recorded by Ibn Battuta as the Koh-i Sulaiman. It is associated with Prophet Solomon. According to the legend told by Ibn Batutta, Prophet Solomon climbed this mountain and looked out over the land of Hind, which was then covered with darkness, and so turned back without descending into this new frontier, and left only the mountain which is named after him.

Another legend says that Qais Abdur Rashid, said to be the legendary ancestor of the Pashtun nation, is buried atop Takht-e-Sulaiman, and so it is also locally known as Da Kasī Ghar (د کسي غر, "Mount of Qais").

Trips to the mountain is undertaken mostly in summer, since from late November until March the snowfall makes it difficult to climb.

== See also ==
- Fort Munro
- Hindu Kush
- List of mountain ranges of the world
- Loe Nekan
- Pul Shekhani
- Sheikh Badin
- Spin Ghar
- Wadani
