= Mashwani =

Pashtun tribe

Mashwani (Pashto: مشواڼي, romanized: Maṣwāṇī) (also Mishwani, Meshwani, Moshwani, Mushwani, Pashto pronunciation: [maʃwɑːɳiː]) is Arab origin tribe mainly settled in different parts of Afghanistan and Iran, in addition to some other neighboring regions. They are Afghans by adoption and Arabs by descent. They use Mashwani, as their surnames. Mashwanis played a vital role in fighting against Sikh Khalsa army.

== Demographics ==
Mashwanis are mainly settled in some parts of Afghanistan, Iran.

- In Afghanistan they live in Konar and Ghazni provinces.
- In Iran Mashwanis live in Zahedan city of Sistan and Baluchestan province.
- In Hazara region of Khyber Pakhtunkhwa Pakistan, particularly in Village Srikot and Gudwalian District Haripur.

== Culture ==
Mashwanis are very friendly and are famous for their hospitality. The majority of Mashwanis are Pashto speakers, hence follow Pakhtun culture. They wear Pashtun traditional dress shalwar kameez. Women cover their head with a shawl while males usually wear kufi, Peshawari cap, turban, Sindhi cap, or pakol as traditional headgear and Peshawari Chappal as footwear. They are Muslims and follow Islam as their religion.

== Progenitor of the Mashwani Tribe ==
Syed Muhammad Kalan also known as Gesudaraz I (because of his long hair) was born in village Kollan of Dalgan, Sistan and Baluchistan province of Iran. He was the Prince of Persia or "Governor of Persia". He sided from Iran to Sulayman Mountain and settled among the Afghans, and fixed his residence between the Kakar, Shirani and Karlani . These three tribes enjoyed his blessed presence, and, learning from him the fundamental truths of Islam. The commanders of these Pashtuns tribes (Kakar, Shirani and Karlani) had presented their daughters to him in respect of his family and mysticism. He married women from each tribe and had sons, Sherani woman had the son known as, "Storyani". Karlani woman had two Sons known as, Wardak and Hanni, Wardak and Hanni were the Sons of Syed Gesudaraz from His Wife Karlani Woman, who were known as progenitors of these tribes. The Arab tribes descended from Gesudaraz I sons are using his sons titles as there "surnames". Mashwani was son of Gesudaraz I from his Kakar wife Sher Bano. Syed Muhammad Kalan (Gesu daraz I) was performing Fajr prayer when his maid came and gave him news about the birth of his son, Syed titled him "Mashwani" which means light of education or "Feather and Inkpot". Mashwani had nine sons, Tukuz, Lodin, Matakati, Suleiman, Roghani, Kazbuli, Ghareb, Khar bari, and Diaz.

=== Ancestor ===
Mashwanis are descended from the Islamic prophet Muhammad, through his daughter Fatima bint Muhammad and Ali ibn Abi Talib.

1. Fāṭima bint Muḥammad (605–632 AD) w/o ʿAlī ibn Abī Ṭālib (600–661 AD)
2. Imam al-Ḥusayn ibn ʿAlī (625–680 AD)
3. Imam ʿAlī ibn al-Ḥusayn al-Sajjād (659–713 AD)
4. Imam Muhammad Baqir 676–733
5. Ja'far al-Sadiq 702–765
6. Isma'il ibn Jafar 719–755. Fatima bint al-Hussain'l-Athram bin al-Hasan bin Ali (mother)
7. Ali ibn Ismail 752–856
8. Syed Faateh (Syed-al-Rajal)
9. Syed Qaim
10. Syed Qaaf
11. Syed Omar
12. Syed Ghafar (Yousaf)
13. Syed Muhammad Kalan (Gesudaraz I) 907–999.
14. Syed Muhammad Masood (Mashwani 959–1016). Brothers: Syed Muhammad Sani (Storyani), Syed Abbas (Wardak), Syed Fakhruddin (Hanni)

== Notable Mashwanis ==
- Sheikh Sayyid Adam Banuri was a famous Sufi scholar in the 16th century, and is known as the progenitor of Benuri tribe. He traces back his own roots to Mashwani in his own book titled "Nikatul Asrar". He wrote a book on the teaching of the Mujadddid and the Naqshbandiyya entitled Kalimatul Ma Arif, two of his other works, the Khulasatu Ma Arif and the Nikatul Asrar, were among other well-known works on Sufi teachings and on the importance of the Naqshbandiyya order. Sayed Adam Banoori was the first to spread the Mujaddid teachings in the Hijaz. Muhammad Yousuf Banuri was one of his grandchildren, was also a famous Islamic scholar, founder of Jamia Uloom-ul-Islamia and former President of Wifaq ul Madaris Al-Arabia, Pakistan. A town in Karachi city was renamed as Allama Banuri town in honor of the known hadith scholar Muhammad Yousuf Banuri.
- Sirajul Haq is a famous Pakistani politician.
- Pir Sabir Shah is a former chief minister of Khyber Pakhtunkhwa and a famous Pakistani Politician.
- Iftikhar Ali Mushwani, a Pakistani politician.
