= Jameel Khan (scholar) =

Pakistani Islamic scholar

Central Information Secretary of Aalmi Majlis Tahaffuz Khatm-e-Nubuwwat
- In office ?–?

Co-founder of Iqra Rauzatul Atfal Trust
- In office April 1984 – 9 October 2004

Personal details
- Born: 1953
- Died: 9 October 2004 (aged 50–51) Karachi, Pakistan
- Party: Jamiat Ulema-e-Islam
- Education: Jamia Uloom-ul-Islamia
- Occupation: Islamic scholar, columnist, co-founder of Iqra Rauzatul Atfal Trust

Jameel Khan (1953 – 9 October 2004) was a Pakistani Islamic scholar, columnist and co-foundeder of Iqra Rauzatul Atfal Trust. He also served as the central spokesman of Aalmi Majlis Tahaffuz Khatm-e-Nubuwwat.

== Early life and education ==
Khan studied at Madrasa Ashraf Uloom Gujranwala. He belonged to Popalzai family of Peshawar, which is a business family but his father dedicated him to religious education and service to Islam. He moved to Karachi and studied under Muhammad Yusuf Banuri in Jamia Uloom-ul-Islamia.

== Career ==
After completing his education, he joined the teaching and Darul Ifta in Jamia Uloom-ul-Islamia. He was politically associated with Jamiat Ulema-e-Islam. He joined Aalmi Majlis Tahaffuz Khatm-e-Nubuwwat in 1970 and also served as its Central Information Secretary for some time. He was regularly associated with the Daily Jang, and was especially active in organizing Islamic pages and special publications on religious topics and personalities.

=== Iqra Rauzatul Atfal Trust ===
He co-founded Iqra Rauzatul Atfal Trust along with Wali Hasan Tonki in April 1984. It has a wide network of schools across the country.

== Assassination ==
Mufti Jameel Ahmed Khan and his companion Maulana Nazir Taunsvi were shot dead by unknown gunmen on 9 October 2004 near the Guru Mandir Chorangi, Karachi. He was assassinated while the majority of the police force in the city was being used to protect Prime Minister Shaukat Aziz, who was present in the city.

Maulana Nazir was seated alongside Mufti Jameel, who was driving the vehicle. Two armed guys on a motorbike stopped the van, opened fire at it, and then fled after it. Jameel was taken to Liaquat National Hospital, the doctor said that he received 6 bullets and died on the way to the hospital.

=== Investigation ===
A team of investigators led by DIG Investigation Manzoor Mughal has been assembled by the province administration to look into the terrorist incident. The Government of Sindh has offered a reward of Rs 2 million to anyone who can identify the militants responsible for the attack.

In February 2022, the suspected terrorist Haider Zaidi alias Salim Bhai, a member of the outlawed group, was detained by Counter Terrorism Department (CTD), Civil Line during an operation in the Mosumiyat neighbourhood of Karachi. According to the CTD in-charge, the accused has slain foreigners as well as muftis and Islamic scholars. In 2004, the accused assassinated Mufti Nizamuddin Shamzai. In 2004, the suspects also murdered Mufti Jameel Khan.

The suspects attacked mosques and processions between 1993 and 1995, according to CTD authorities. In 2004, the defendant blew up a motorbike bomb in front of Jamia Banuria. The Red Book lists Haider Zaidi; the suspect had terrorist training from Para Chinar; and the suspect was engaged in the bombing of Maulana Ziaur Rehman in Lahore. His name is included in the Red Book, the suspect received terrorist training from Para Chinar, the suspect has been involved in the bomb attack on Zia ur Rehman Farooqi in Lahore. Weapons have been recovered from his possession while further investigation is going on.

== See also ==
- List of Deobandis
