= Abdul Haleem Chishti =

Pakistani Islamic scholar and writer (1929 – 2020)

Maulana Abdul Halim Chishti Nomani
- مولانا ڈاکٹر عبدالحلیم چشتی نعمانی

Personal life
- Born: 16 April 1929 Jaipur, Rajasthan
- Died: 12 October 2020 (aged 91)
- Resting place: University of Karachi Cemetery
- Education: Karachi University; MA in Islamic Studies; Master in Library Science; PhD in Library Science
- Occupation: Islamic scholar, librarian, writer

Religious life
- Religion: Islam
- Institute: University of Karachi; Radio Pakistan; Bayero University Kano Library; Jamia Uloom Islamia

Muslim leader
- Teacher: Hussain Ahmad Madani, Abdul Rasheed Nomani, Fateh Muhammad Panipati

Abdul Haleem Chishti Nomani (16 April 1929 – 12 October 2020) was a Pakistani Islamic scholar, librarian, writer and the first PhD in library sciences in Pakistan. He was a disciple of Hussain Ahmad Madani. He was head of the Department of Hadith Studies at Jamia Uloom Islamia and the younger brother of Abdul Rasheed Nomani.

== Early life and education ==
Abdul Haleem Chishti was born on 16 April 1929 in Jaipur, Rajasthan coinciding with Zul Qaida 1347 AH. His father Abdul Rahim was a calligrapher and had memorized the Quran. Abdul Haleem received his early education at Madarsa Taleem ul Islam in Jaipur. In 1940, he entered Jamia Nizamia, in Hyderabad, where he studied Arabic and joined the Munshi Fazil course. He went to Darul Uloom Deoband in 1363 AH for higher education and graduated in 1369 AH; where his teachers included Hussain Ahmad Madani. He did an MA in Islamic studies from Karachi University in 1967, and a Masters in Library science in 1970. In 1981, he obtained the degree of PhD.

== Career ==
Chishti migrated after the creation of Pakistan, and initially settled in Ranchhor Line, Karachi. In 1949, he worked in Radio Pakistan for two years, after that he took a government job in Liaquat National Library for 14 years, after that he served in University of Karachi for a long time, and for some time he was the Khatib of Karachi University Mosque.

After leaving the University of Karachi in 1977, he moved to Nigeria, where he served for 10 years as a senior cataloger in the Bayero University Kano Library. Then returned to Pakistan around 1987. In 1992–91, on the guidance and desire of Habibullah Mukhtar, he came to Jamia Uloom Islamia, Allama Banuri Town, as a specialist in Hadith Studies and after his return, he remained associated with the Jamia. Dozens of academic and research papers of PhD level have been written on the subject of Hadith science under his supervision, which have made their mark in the field of research, many of these papers have been published.

== Literary works ==
He authored more than a dozen books.

== Death ==
Chishti died on 12 October 2020. The first funeral prayer was performed at Jamia Tur Rasheed by Mufti Muhammad and he was buried in University of Karachi cemetery.

== See also ==
- List of Deobandis
