= Anwar Badakhshani =

Pakistani Islamic scholar (1932–2024)

Sheikh ul Tafsir, Sheikh ul Hadith Maulana Syed Muhammad Anwar Badakhshani
- شیخ التفسیر والحدیث مولانا سید محمد انور بدخشانی

Personal life
- Born: 1932 Badakhshan, Afghanistan
- Died: 13 August 2024 (aged 91–92)
- Children: 3 sons, 6 daughters including (Maulana Mufti Muhammad Anas Anwar Badakhshani and Maulana Mufti Muhammad Umar Anwar Badakhshani)
- Notable work: Translation of the Quran into Persian (Dari)
- Education: Anjuman Taleem Al-Qur'an Kohat, Jamia Islamia Akora Khattak, Darul Uloom Islamia Saidu Sharif, Jamia Uloom-ul-Islamia
- Known for: Islamic jurisprudence, Quran translation
- Occupation: Scholar, Writer and Educator
- Relatives: Muhammad Yusuf Banuri (father-in-law)

Religious life
- Religion: Islam

Maulana Syed Muhammad Anwar Badakhshani (Urdu: مولانا سید محمد انور بدخشانی; 1932 – 13 August 2024) was an Afghan-born Pakistani scholar, writer and educator, known for his contributions to Islamic jurisprudence and literature. Born in Badakhshan, Afghanistan, he pursued his early education under the guidance of his uncle, Maulana Muhammad Sharif, before relocating to Pakistan in 1965 for advanced studies. Badakhshani's academic journey led him to esteemed institutions such as Jamia Farooqia and Jamia Uloom-ul-Islamia. His career spanned several decades, during which he taught various Islamic sciences and authored over forty books in Arabic and Persian. He also translated the Quran into Persian (Dari), a widely published and recognized work.

== Early life and education ==
Syed Muhammad Anwar Badakhshani was born in Badakhshan, Afghanistan in 1932. He received his initial education from his uncle Maulana Muhammad Sharif (a disciple of Kifayatullah Dehlawi). Badakhshani then moved to Pakistan around 1965 for further education. Here he got knowledge in Anjuman Taleem Al-Qur'an Kohat, Jamia Islamia Akora Khattak and Darul Uloom Islamia Saidu Sharif. Maulana Sheikh Abdul Ghaffar, Muhammad Fareed, Sheikh Fazl Elahi, Sheikh Khan Bahadur Martung, Sheikh Latafat Rahman Swati are among his famous teachers.

Later, he moved to Jamia Uloom-ul-Islamia Banuri Town and acquired the Hadith study from Yusuf Banuri, Wali Hasan Tonki, Maulana Misbahullah Shah, Maulana Idris Meerthi, Maulana Badi-ul-Zaman, Maulana Fazal Muhammad Swati. And he got Tafsir study from Ghulamullah Khan.

== Career ==
In 1971, after the completion of Dars-i-Nizami course, he taught the books of jurisprudence, principles of jurisprudence, logic, Arabic literature, including Sunan Nasa'i and Ibn Majah, for two years in Jamia Farooqia Shah Faisal Colony and in 1974, from Jamia Uloom Islamia Allama Banuri Town. He became attached, and continued to irrigate knowledge till death.

And in 1974, he was affiliated with Jamia Uloom-ul-Islamia Banuri Town, and continued to till his death. He taught from the early books to Sahih Bukhari in Jamia Uloom-ul-Islamia, until he held the position of Sheikh Al-Hadith.

== Literary works ==
Along with teaching, he was also engaged in the field of writing and compilation, authoring more than forty books in Arabic and Persian languages some of them are also included in Dars-i-Nizami.

He also translated Quran into Persian (Dari) language. Saudi government's King Fahd Complex for the Printing of the Holy Quran selected this translation and published it for a large number of residents of Persian regions and the former government of Afghanistan also published this translation under the Afghan Ministry of Religious Affairs. At the same time, he had also completed the commentary of the Quran consisting of six volumes.

Some of his work includes:

- Tashil Ùsul al-Shashi
- Dīnī madāris kī z̤urūrat aur jadīd taqāz̤aon̲ ke mut̤ābiq niṣāb va niz̤ām-i taʻlīm
- Daur-i ḥāz̤ir ke fitne aur un kā ʻilāj
- ʻIlm-i Ḥadīs̲, muḥaddis̲īn aur kutub-i Ḥadīs̲ par Ḥaẓrat Bannūrī kī nādir taṣnīf
- Talkhees Sharh Al Aqeedah Al-Tahawiyya" also translated by Sheikh Muhammad Sadik Muhammad Yusuf as Aqidatut Tahoviya sharhining talxiysi.
- تسهيل شرح الجامي: تهذيب الفوائد الضيائية
- البلاغة الصافية
- طريق الوصول الى علوم البلاغة

== Death ==
He had been ill for the past few years, until in the last few days the illness worsened and he was admitted to the hospital and died on Tuesday, 13 August 2024. After the noon prayer, scholars and his students offered a funeral prayer at Jamia Uloom Islamia under the leadership of Taqi Usmani and he was buried in the graveyard of Darul Uloom Karachi. He is survived by three sons, six daughters and a wife (with whom the third marriage took place).

== Personal life ==
He was the son-in-law of Muhammad Yusuf Banuri, and after the death of his first wife, Noor Ahmad's daughter (granddaughter of Muhammad Shafi) was married to him. His two sons Maulana Mufti Muhammad Anas Anwar Badakhshani and Maulana Mufti Muhammad Umar Anwar Badakhshani are involved in teaching/faculty/member Dar-ul-Ifta in Jamia Uloom Islamia.

== See also ==
- List of Deobandis

== Bibliography ==
- میری علمی ومطالعاتی زندگی: مولانا محمد انور بدخشانی lit. 'My academic and study life: Maulana Muhammad Anwar Badakhshani' - islaminsight.org
- سمینار علمی و تحقیقی بدخشان در گسترۀ فرهنگ موالنا محمد أنور بدخشانی lit. 'Scientific and research seminar of Badakhshan in the scope of Maulana Muhammad Anwar Badakhshani' By Dr. Abdul Bari Hameedi University of Kabul
