= Jalandhari =

Jalandhari is a toponymic surname (nisba) for people from Jalandhar, a city in Punjab, India. Notable people with this surname include:

- Hafeez Jalandhari (1900–1982), Pakistani Urdu-language poet who wrote the lyrics for the national anthem of Pakistan
- Muhammad Hanif Jalandhari, Pakistani Islamic scholar
- Khair Muhammad Jalandhari (1895–1970), Pakistani Islamic scholar
- Muhammad Ali Jalandhari (1895–1971), Pakistani Islamic scholar
