= Madina Masjid case =

Supreme Court of Pakistan case

Madina Masjid case was a legal case about a mosque which was built on illegal land on Tariq Road, Karachi in 1980 and was affiliated with Jamia Uloom-ul-Islamia, Banuri Town.

In December 2021, the Supreme Court of Pakistan ordered the demolition of the mosque because it was built in a park. In January 2022, Supreme Court rejected plea of the government to maintain status quo until the Government of Sindh completes the investigation of the matter.
