= Muzammil Hussain Kapadia =

Pakistani Islamic scholar and educationist (1961–2021)

Mufti Muzammil Hussain Kapadia
- مفتی مزمل حسین کاپڑیا

Personal life
- Born: 1961
- Died: 2021 (aged 59–60)
- Resting place: Mewa Shah Cemetery
- Education: Jamia Uloom-ul-Islamia; Umm Al-Qura University
- Occupation: Mufti, academician

Religious life
- Religion: Islam
- Denomination: Sunni
- Institute: Iqra Rozatul Atfal Trust

Muslim leader
- Teacher: Wali Hasan Tonki

Muzammil Hussain Kapadia (1961–2021) was a Pakistani cleric, academic and deputy director and founding member of the Iqra Rozatul Atfal Trust.

== Education ==
He graduated from Jamia Uloom-ul-Islamia in 1981. He also obtained the certificate of Mufti by specializing in Islamic jurisprudence under the supervision of Wali Hasan Tonki. He has also studied for five years at Umm Al-Qura University, Makkah, on the subject of the principles of religion.

== Death ==
He died in February 2021. His funeral prayers were offered by his teacher Muhammad Rafiq at Jamia Uloom-ul-Islamia Banuri Town in which thousands of scholars and students and people participated. Abdul Razzaq Iskander, Syed Sulaiman Yousuf Banuri, Anwar-ul-Haq Haqqani, Khalid Mahmood, Muhammad Hanif Jalandhari, Aziz-ur-Rehman Rahmani Maulana, Imdadullah Yousafzai, Haq Nawaz and other scholars attended the funeral. He was buried in Mewa Shah Cemetery.
