= Muhammad Ali Jalandhari =

Pakistani Muslim scholar

Mawlāna Muhammad Ali Jalandhari
- مولانا محمّد على جالندھرى

3rd Emir of Aalmi Majlis Tahaffuz Khatm-e-Nubuwwat
- Preceded by: Qazi Ahsan Ahmed Shuja Abadi
- Succeeded by: Lal Hussain Akhtar

1st General secretary of Aalmi Majlis Tahaffuz Khatm-e-Nubuwwat

Personal life
- Born: 1895 Raipur Araian, Jalandhar
- Died: 21 April 1971 (aged 75–76)
- Political party: Majlis-e-Ahrar-ul-Islam
- Education: Darul Uloom Deoband

Religious life
- Religion: Islam
- Denomination: Sunni
- Institute: Jamia Khairul Madaris
- Founder of: Jamia Khairul Madaris; Aalmi Majlis Tahaffuz Khatm-e-Nubuwwat
- Movement: Aalmi Majlis Tahaffuz Khatm-e-Nubuwwat

Muslim leader
- Teacher: Khair Muhammad Jalandhari; Anwar Shah Kashmiri

Muhammad Ali Jalandhari (1895 – 21 April 1971) was a prominent Deobandi Scholar and Ahrari leader. He also served as president of Majlis-e-Ahrar-e-Islam Punjab during Khatm-e-Nubuwwat movement in 1953. He also served as Emir and General secretary of Aalmi Majlis Tahaffuz Khatm-e-Nubuwwat.

== Early life and education ==
Jalandhari was born in 1895 in Raipur Araian, Jalandhar, Nakodar (now Jalandhar district, India)

Jalandhari received his early education from Faqir Ullah, a student of Mahmud Hasan Deobandi and then studied with Khair Muhammad Jalandhari in Jalandhar. He studied hadith sciences with Anwar Shah Kashmiri at Darul Uloom Deoband.

== Career ==
Jalandhari co-founded Jamia Khairul Madaris and Aalmi Majlis Tahaffuz Khatm-e-Nubuwwat. He was also one of the foremost leaders of Majlis-e-Ahrar-e-Islam and served as a member of the Central Working Committee of the All India Majlis-e-Ahrar Islam and president of Majlis-e-Ahrar-ul-Islam Punjab chapter.

== Writings ==
His written contributions span educational grammar texts, Quranic translation, and Islamic literature.

- مبادی القواعد (Mabādiʾ al‑Qawāʿid, "Fundamentals of Grammar") – Urdu grammar primer for primary-level students; published in 1938 by Atar Chand & Kapoor, Lahore. Adopted into Punjab's upper-primary school curriculum.
- افضل القواعد (Afḍal al‑Qawāʿid, "Superior Grammar") – Advanced Urdu grammar, also part of Lahore primary curriculum following its publication in the late 1930s.
- مصباح القواعد (Miṣbāḥ al‑Qawāʿid, "Lantern of Grammar") – Widely used Urdu grammar text from the same series, published circa 1938.
- منہاج القواعد (Minhāj al‑Qawāʿid, "Path of Grammar") – Urdu grammar book included in Punjab University entrance curriculum around the same period.
- Quran Translation – ‌'فاتح الحميد' (Fātih al‑Ḥamīd, "Opener Praiseworthy")** – His Urdu translation of the Quran, first published in 1960 in Amritsar. Praised for its clarity and language, later republished in Pakistan as Nūr-e-Hidayat, and adopted by Radio Pakistan for the Saut al-Qur’an broadcast.
- Literary and Islamic writings – Authored works such as Irshādāt al‑Qur’ān, al‑Islām, Nafā’is al-Qiṣaṣ wa‑l‑Ḥikāyāt, al‑Yāqūṭ al‑Marjān, and Nafīṣ Tuḥfah.

== See also ==
- List of Deobandis
