= Adil Khan =

Adil Khan may refer to:

- Adil Khan (actor) (born 1983), Norwegian actor
- Adil Khan (footballer) (born 1988), Indian footballer
- Muhammad Adil Khan (1957–2020), Pakistani Islamic scholar

== See also ==
- Adilkhan Sagindykov (born 1979), Kazakh taekwondo practitioner
- Adilkhan Garahmadov (born 2001), Azerbaijani footballer
