= Petaw Payan =

Village in Khyber Pakhtunkhwa, Pakistan

Pitaw Payan
- Village
- Location within Pakistan
- Coordinates: 33.56°N 72.10°E
- Country: Pakistan
- Time zone: UTC+5 (PST)
- Area code: 00923

Petaw Payan, is a developing village in the Nowshera District of Khyber Pakhtunkhwa province of Pakistan. It is one of the main link for connecting the far Southwestern villages to the town of Jehangira. It is situated at 33"56'03.91" N and 72"10'39.84" E and 340 meters high from the sea level.

== People and Tribes ==
Petaw Payan is the home area of the Khattak tribes, a family group related to Khushaal Khan Khattak, a poet and warrior. The population of Petaw Payan is approximately 15000 inhabitants. Pashto is the primary language, but some of the younger residents are fluent in Urdu, Arabic, and English.

Major tribes in Petaw Payan include Razar, Babu Khel and Kakar.

== Environment ==
Petaw Payan is surrounded by green low and high hills on its east and west. Petaw is an agriculture dominated village with green citrus plants as the dominating earning plant. These citrus plants have the ability to keep environment at its best.

== Education ==
Petaw Payan has five primary schools, Two for girls and three for boys , a secondary school for boys and a middle school for girls. The local literacy rate is almost negligible at higher level and is growing rapidly at the lower level with approximately 60%.

There are Five teacher.

Muhammad Ijaz Khan SST

Fazle Rabbi SST

Raheem Ullah PST

There is only one Director of drug at islamabad. ( Rabnawaz Khan )

== Religion ==
The people of Petaw Payan are Muslims. There are four mosques in the village.

== Legal system ==
Disputes are solved by the Jarga system and there is rarely contact with the courts.

== Healthcare ==
There is no health care center in the Village and residents are totally dependent on the clinics situated in Jehangira and Shaidu to meet their health requirements.

== Economy ==
Agriculture, mining and foreign jobs are the village's main sources of income. Agricultural practices have been shifted from intensive practices of growing vegetables that need plenty of water, pesticides, insecticides, fertilizers and hardworking; to very soft practices of gardening that has less fatigue and more income. Gardening is successful practice because Pakistan is facing an energy crisis these days and gardening (growing fruit trees) need less water and thus less energy. Main commercial fruits are oranges and lemon. However, people have grown many varieties of fruit trees for their own use and their guests. Non-commercial fruits recognized are papaya, pomegranate, grapes, bananas, guava, palm, apricots, grey fruits, walnuts, peaches, almonds, mango, figs, persimmons and zizupus.

== Geology ==
Petaw Payan is located in Attock-Cherat Range.

Geologically Petaw Payan is a buried Valley with gravely soil that produces very delicious fruits and vegetables. Water is this type of Valley has perfect composition like the standard distilled water. Main lithologies are slates of Manki Formation of Cambrian age which are mined by local people in the form of grave-slabs. Limestone of Khattak Formation is another dominant lithology which is crushed by crushing plants for obtaining cheap, easily accessible and durable construction aggregates.

Slates are broken down naturally into pencil structures to form another type of construction aggregate "locally known as Shengal" which is mostly used for filling purposes and is being fluently transported to nearby cities.

Recently the PMDC " Pakistan Mineral Development Corporation" has made a commercial discovery of graphite, sulphur and red oxide in the Manki Slates at Western border of the village's territory. Coal mining has also been started in the area, however, this coal is of sub-bituminous grade.

== Transport ==
Datsun , Taxis and private cars are the main sources of transport.
