= Fateh Muhammad Panipati =

Pakistani Islamic scholar (1905–1987)

Qari Fateh Muhammad Panipati

Personal life
- Born: 18 January 1905 Panipat, British India
- Died: 16 April 1987 (aged 82) Medina, Saudi Arabia
- Resting place: Al-Baqi Cemetery
- Education: Darul Uloom Deoband

Religious life
- Religion: Islam

Muslim leader
- Students: Abdul Haleem Chishti

Fateh Muhammad Panipati (18 January 1905 – 16 April 1987) was a Pakistani Islamic scholar who worked in the field of qira'at (Qur'an recitation methods). He was an alumnus of Darul Uloom Deoband and wrote books including Al-Qurrah al-Marḍiyyah and Inayate Rahmani.

== Biography ==
Fateh Muhammad Panipati was born on 18 January 1905 (coinciding 12 Dhu al-Qadah 1322 AH) in Panipat. He graduated in the traditional dars-e-nizami from the Darul Uloom Deoband. His teachers included Asghar Hussain Deobandi, Hussain Ahmad Madani, Ibrahim Balyawi, Izaz Ali Amrohi and Muhammad Shafi.

In 1947, when Pakistan was established, Panipati migrated there and briefly taught in Ichhra and Pind Dadan Khan. He taught at Madrasah Ashrafiyyah Fayḍ al-Qurʾān in Shikarpur from 1948 to 1956. He moved to Karachi in 1957 at the invitation of Muhammad Shafi Deobandi, and taught at the Nanak Wara branch of Darul Uloom Karachi, for over fifteen years. He was considered a senior scholar of Quranic recitation during his time. Taqi Usmani has described him as the contemporary al-Jazari. His students included Abdul Haleem Chishti, Abdush Shakoor Tirmizi, Raheem Bakhsh Panipati and Siddiq Ahmad Bandwi.

Panipati migrated to Medina in 1972 and began teaching in the Al-Masjid an-Nabawi. He spent the last few years of his life in Medina. He visited Lahore for a short while where he suffered from hemiparesis on 20 May 1979, leading him to return to Medina. He died on 16 April 1987 and was buried in Al-Baqi Cemetery. His funeral prayer was led by Ali ibn Abdur-Rahman al Hudhaify.

== Literary works ==
Panipati wrote seventeen books in Urdu. He wrote Inayate Rahmani, a commentary on al-Qasim ibn Firruh's Ḥirz alAmānī wa Wajh al-Tahānī, commonly known as al-Shatibiyyah. His other works include:

- Al-Qurrah al-Marḍiyyah
- Ashal al-Mawārid fī Sharḥ ʿAqīlat Atrāb al-Qaṣāʾid
- Miftāḥ al-Kamāl
- Nūrānī Qāʿidah
- Tashīl al-Qawāʿid
- ʿUmdat al-Mabānī

== See more ==
- List of Deobandis
