= Saleemullah Khan =

Pakistani Sunni Muslim scholar

Sheikh al-Hadith Mawlānā Shaykh al-Qul Saleemullah Khan

President of Wifaq ul Madaris Al-Arabia, Pakistan
- In office 8 June 1989 – 15 January 2017
- Preceded by: Muhammad Idrees Mirti
- Succeeded by: Abdur Razzaq Iskander

Rector of Jamia Farooqia
- In office 1967 – 15 January 2017
- Preceded by: "office established"
- Succeeded by: Muhammad Adil Khan

Personal life
- Born: 1921 Hasanpur Luhari , District Muzaffarnagar , United Provinces, British India
- Died: January 15, 2017 (aged 95–96) Karachi, Sindh, Pakistan
- Children: Muhammad Adil Khan (son)
- Notable work: Kashf al-Bari Amma fi Sahih al-Bukhari
- Education: Darul Uloom Deoband

Religious life
- Religion: Islam
- Denomination: Sunni
- Founder of: Jamia Farooqia

Muslim leader
- Students: Rafi Usmani Taqi Usmani Nizamuddin Shamzai Manzoor Mengal Maulana Abdul Aziz, Mahmudul Hasan

Saleemullah Khan (1921 – 15 January 2017) was a Pakistani Islamic scholar and a former President of Wifaq ul Madaris Al-Arabia, Pakistan.

His students include Mufti Rafi Usmani, Maulana Abdul Aziz, Maulan Manzoor Mengal and Mufti Taqi Usmani.

He established Jamia Farooqia in Karachi in 1967.

Khan died on 15 January 2017 in Karachi, Pakistan.

== Education and career ==
Saleemullah Khan was born in Hasanpur Luhari District, Muzaffarnagar, in British India. Starting in 1942, he studied at Darul Uloom Deoband under the guidance of Hussain Ahmad Madani, Izaz Ali Amrohi and many other teachers. He completed his traditional dars-e-nizami degree in 1947. Then he taught at Miftahul Uloom Jalalabad in India under the tutelage of Masihullah Khan for eight years before he decided to migrate to Pakistan. In Pakistan, he founded Jamia Farooqia, Karachi in 1967.

Khan taught at Tando Allahyar, Sindh, Pakistan for three years and also at Dar-ul-Uloom, Karachi later.

He also served as president of Wafaq ul Madaris Al-Arabia, Pakistan (Federation of Islamic Seminaries, Pakistan) from 8 June 1989 to 15 January 2017, for over 27 years.

== Literary works ==
In a fatwa, Darul Uloom Deoband has regarded Khan's 16 volume commentary to Sahih al-Bukhari entitled Kashf al-Bari Amma fi Sahih al-Bukhari as one of the best commentaries.

== Death and legacy ==
Khan died on Sunday, 15 January 2017 in Karachi. His funeral prayer was performed twice and attended by Mufti Taqi Usmani, Maulana Tariq Jamil, Muhammad Ahmed Ludhianvi.

His son, Muhammad Adil Khan was assassinated on 10 October 2020.

== See also ==
- List of Deobandis
