= Sayyid Adam Banuri =

Indian Naqshbandi Sufi (1503/06–1643)

Allama Abu Abdullah Sheikh Sayyid Adam Banuri Muazzeddin
- سید آدم بنوری

Personal life
- Born: 1503/06 AD Banoor, Chandigarh, Delhi Sultanate
- Died: 25 December 1643 Medina, Habesh Eyalet, Ottoman Empire
- Resting place: Jannat al-Baqī
- Children: Sayyid Ghulam Ahmad, Sayyid Muhammad Aoliya, Sayyid Muhammad Esa, Sayyid Muhammad Mohsin and two daughters
- Parent: Ismail bin Bahauddin Mashwani
- Notable work(s): Founded Ahsaniya Naqshbandiya Sufi Order, Literature work, Books written by him
- Known for: Sufi, Mystic, Scholar of Sunni sect, Progenitor of Banoori tribe

Religious life
- Religion: Islam
- Denomination: Sufi
- Founder of: Ahsaniya-Naqshbandiya Sufi Order
- Philosophy: Sufism
- Lineage: Sayyid
- Tariqa: Naqshbandi-Mujaddidi

Sheikh Sayyid Adam Banuri (Persian: سید آدم بنوری, b. 1503/06, d. 1643) was a Sufi spiritual adviser to Ahmad Sirhindi.

== Early life ==
His parents were Ismail bin Bahauddin Mashwani He was born in Banur, Chandigarh, then part of the Delhi Sultanate of India.

== Career ==
He is known for his research on Sufism. He is the founder of “Ahsaniya” with some modifications in Ahmad Sirhindi’s Naqshbandi-Mujaddidi thoughts. Ahsaniya is mostly followed by Arabs in Egypt and Yemen. In 1641 Abdul Hakim Sialkoti and Sadduallh (advisor to Mughal Emperor Shah Jahan) visited him in Lahore. They both advised Shah Jahan to dispatch Adam for Hajj. He travelled and performed Hajj with hundreds of his students. He died in Medina in 1643. He is buried at Jannat al-Baqī.
