= Banoori =

Banuri (also spelled Banoori or Binori) is the family name of Sayyids from the family of the Islamic prophet, Muhammad, being his direct descendants and deriving lineage through Sheikh Sayyid Adam Banuri from the Pakhtun region of Afghanistan (today's Pakistan) including the regions of Kohat, Peshawar, Landi kotal, Swat and Malakand His lineage traces back to Imam Musa ibn Ja'far al-Kadhim from the family of Muhammad.

== Origins ==
People with family name Banuri are the direct descendants of Muhammad through Sufi Sheikh of the Naqshbandiyya order, Sheikh Sayyid Adam Banuri. The name Banuri originated from the Sheikh who travelled from Afghanistan and spent some time in the Indian town of Banur near Sirhind, where he was ordained to attain his spiritual status in Sufism. Banur is a small town about 25 km from Chandigarh, the capital of Indian Punjab, on the Chandigarh-Patiala National Highway, NH 64. Banuris are not a clan of several families but represent only one aristocratic and noble family which has a direct link with Muhammad. The lineage of Sayyid Adam Banuri can therefore be directly traced to Muhammad and onward to Ibrahim - another great prophet.

Banuris due to their lineage and aristocratic background suffered great setbacks during the Mughal period and later under the colonial rule.

== Sayyid Adam Banuri ==
Sheikh Sayyid Adam Banuri lived in Afghanistan. The ancestors of Sayyid Adam Banuri were from Roh region in Iraq.

== Books ==
In 1625–26, Syed Adam Banuri wrote a book on the teachings of the Mujaddid and the Naqshbandiyya entitled Kalimatul Ma'arif. Two of his other works; the Khulasatul Ma'arif and the Nikatul Asrar, were among other works on Sufi teachings and on the importance of the Naqshbandiyya order. Sayyid Adam Banuri was also the first to spread the Mujaddid's teachings in Hijaz.

== Disciples ==
A large number of Pashtuns and other Muslims became his disciples and followers, with Muhammad Amin Badakhshi estimating the number to be 12,000 with 100 Khalifas. So large was the Sheikh's following that it became a perceived challenge and suspect in the eyes of the Mughal officials and the crony nobility of the area. In 1052/1642–43, the Sheikh arrived in Lahore with his supporting contingent made up of mostly disciples (who by this time were amounting to the size of a private army). The Mughal Governor was so apprehensive that the Emperor decided to dispatch his Diwan, Saad-ullah Khan, accompanied by Mullah Abdul Hakim Sialkoti to investigate the situation. Sayyid Adam Banuri ignored them both. On Saad-ullah Khan's recommendation, the Mughal Emperor, who regarded Naqshbandiyya order as an adversary to the Mughal kingdom, became convinced that the great following was a potential threat to the Emperor and had the Sheikh and some of his disciples banished to Mecca.

It is said that Emperor Shah Jahan, saw a dream that his kingdom has fallen, and therein realized his mistake of ill treating Adam Banuri. He tried to stop Adam Banuri from leaving, but it was too late, Adam Banuri had already left for Mecca from the port of Kathiawar by ship. The prophecy came true as soon after, Aurangzeb Alamgir took over the throne, and imprisoned his father (Shah Jahan) in the Agra fort.

After performing the Hajj pilgrimage in Mecca, Adam Banuri went to Medina to debate and promote the reformist thesis with other great ulema of the time. He died in Medina in 1642. His family thereafter suffered two setbacks, one during the reign of Emperor Aurangzeb who challenged their influence in the Swat and Buner regions of Yusufzai tribes and later during the occupation period and rule of the British when most of their forestry and agriculture land was turned into a Crown land, and its retention was subjected to a period of lease which was renewable conditioned to the continued loyalty of the owners to the Crown.

== See also ==
- Muhammad Yusuf Banuri
