= Manzoor Mengal =

Pakistani Sunni Muslim scholar

Sheikh al-Hadith Manzoor Ahmad Mengal
- منظور احمد مینگل
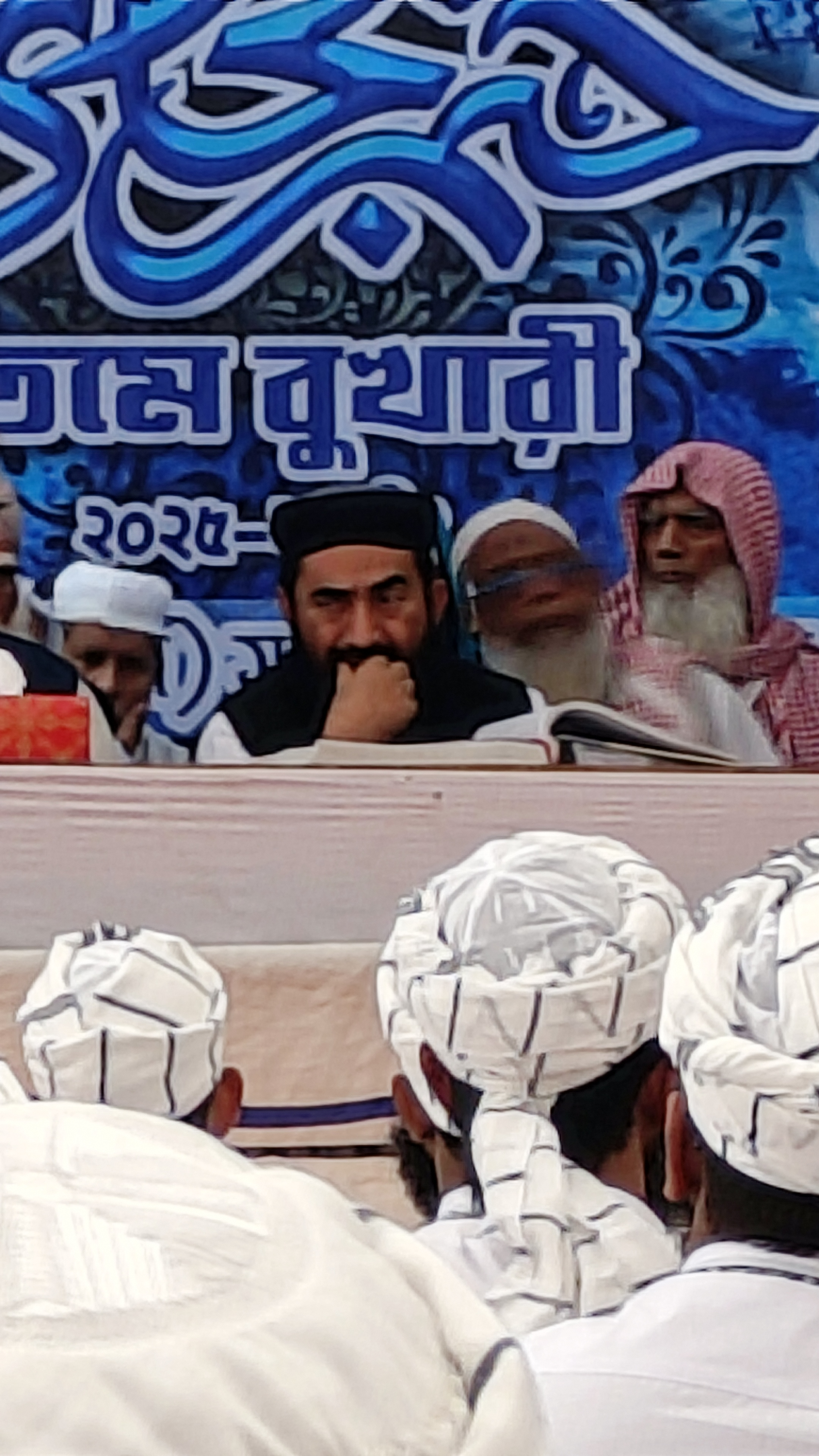
- Mengal in 2026

Personal life
- Born: 1963 (age 62–63) Khuzdar, West Pakistan, Pakistan
- Notable work: Tuhfatul Manazir
- Education: Jamia Farooqia; University of Sindh

Religious life
- Religion: Islam
- Denomination: Sunni
- Jurisprudence: Hanafi
- Movement: Deobandi

Muslim leader
- Teacher: Saleemullah Khan; Nizamuddin Shamzai; Abu Lubaba Shah Mansoor; Muhammad Abdullah Ghazi

Manzoor Ahmad Mengal (Note: Urdu: منظور احمد مینگل) (c. 1963) is a Pakistani Islamic scholar from Balochistan, who serves as the Sheikh al-Hadīṯh at the Jamia Siddiqia and Jamia Farooqia. He is a supporter of the Sunni Deobandi organization Jamiat Ulema-e Islam (F).

== Education and career ==
Manzoor Ahmad Mengal was born in Khuzdar, West Pakistan in c. 1963 to a Brahui family belonging to the Mengal tribe. He received his early education at a government school. In 1973, he enrolled at a madrasa in his home village.

After completing his study of the Quran, he moved to Tando Muhammad Khan in 1979 and joined the Darul Uloom Muhammadiya Madrasa. He later continued his studies at Jamia Farooqia in Karachi, specializing in the field of Hadith studies.

== Career and scholarly work ==
Mengal served as an imam at Jamia Farooqia for 28 years. During his tenure, he is reported to have led the recitation of the entire Quran 28 times during obligatory prayers.

In 1992, he completed a PhD from the University of Sindh in a period of two months, under the supervision of Nizamuddin Shamzai. He also memorized Sahih Bukhari during a stay in Saudi Arabia, a feat he accomplished in a month and a half. Mengal is multilingual, with proficiency in Balochi, Brahui, Pashto, Urdu, Arabic, and Persian.

== Controversy ==
In 2021, following the annual Aurat March on International Women's Day, Mengal repeated allegations of blasphemy propagated by anti-feminist elements in Pakistan.

== Books ==
- Tuhfatul Manazir

== See also ==
- Muhammad Ilyas Ghuman
