= Kapadia =

Kapadia is a surname common in India and Pakistan. The name literally translates into "fabric maker". Traditionally, it included people involved in the textiles industry. Notable people with the surname Kapadia include:

== India ==
- Dimple Kapadia (born 1957), actress
- Harish Kapadia (born 1945), mountaineer
- Nawang Kapadia (1975–2000), Indian Army officer and Harish's son
- Simple Kapadia (1958–2009), actress
- Sarosh Homi Kapadia, Former Chief Justice of India
- Novy Kapadia, Indian Football Commentator and Author
- Payal Kapadia, filmmaker
- Aditya Kapadia (born 1986), Actor (TV and films)

== Pakistan ==
- Latif Kapadia (1934–2002)
- Muzammil Hussain Kapadia (1961–2021)
- Faisal Kapadia (born 1971)

== United Kingdom ==
- Alex Kapadia (born 1980), British racing driver
- Asif Kapadia (born 1972), filmmaker
