= Al-Jazari (surname) =

Al-Jazari is an Arabic surname. The attributive title (nisba), Jazari, denotes an origin from Jazirat ibn 'Umar

Notable people with the surname include:

- Ibn al-Razzaz Al-Jazari, Muslim polymath who lived during the Islamic Golden Age (Middle Ages)
- Ali 'Izz al-Din Ibn al-Athir al-Jazari: a prominent Muslim historian
- Muhammad ibn Muhammad Ibn al-Jazari: a distinguished Muslim scholar in the field of the qira'at of the Qur'an
