= Adil Khan (scholar) =

Pakistani Sunni Muslim scholar (1957–2020)

Doctor Allamah Mawlānā Adil Khan
- مولانا ڈاکٹر عادل خان
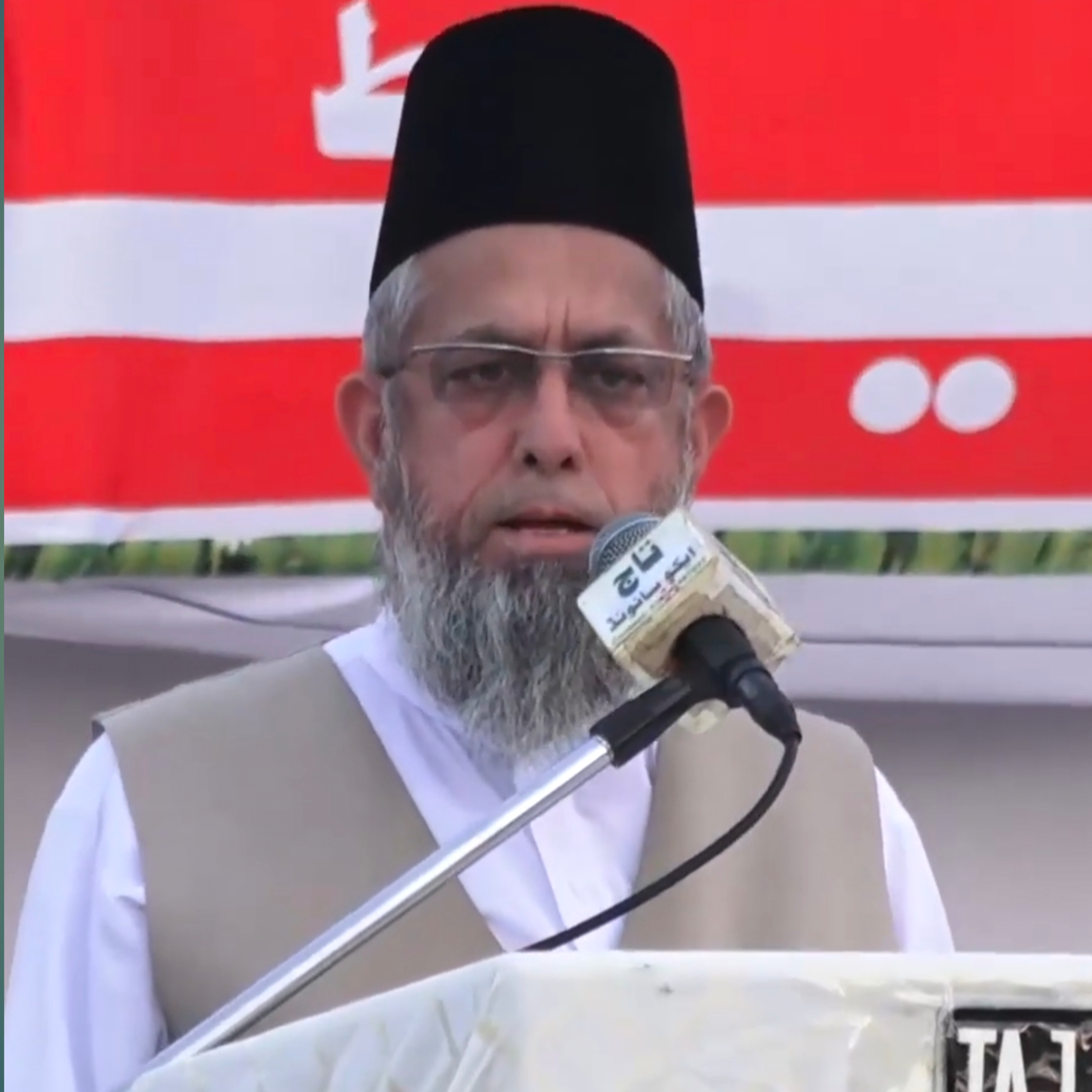
- Khan in c. 2017

Rector of Jamia Farooqia
- In office 15 January 2017 – 10 October 2020
- Preceded by: Saleemullah Khan

Personal details
- Born: 1957 Sindh, Pakistan
- Died: 10 October 2020 (aged 62–63) Karachi, Sindh, Pakistan
- Cause of death: Assassination
- Education: Jamia Farooqia, University of Karachi
- Awards: Five Star Ranking Award, 2018 from Malaysia Higher Education

Personal life
- Parent: Saleemullah Khan (father)
- Notable work: Tārīkh Islāmi Jamhūriya-e-Pākistān

Religious life
- Religion: Islam
- Denomination: Sunni Hanafi
- Movement: Deobandi

Muḥammad Adil Khān (1957 – 10 October 2020) was a Pakistani Islamic scholar, who served as the rector of Jamia Farooqia and was seen as an influential Sunni Deobandi scholar of Pakistan.

He was the son of Saleemullah Khan. and an alumnus of the Jamia Farooqia and the University of Karachi and taught at the International Islamic University Malaysia for eight years from 2010 to 2018. He was also a member of the working committee of the Wifaq ul Madaris Al-Arabia.

Khan received the Five Star Ranking Award from Malaysia Higher Education in 2018.

He was assassinated by unknown armed men near a shopping center in Shah Faisal Colony, Karachi on 10 October 2020.

== Biography ==
Muhammad Adil Khan was born in 1957 and was the son of Saleemullah Khan. He graduated in the traditional dars-e-nizami from Jamia Farooqia in 1973; he got a B.A in human science in 1976, an M.A in Arabic in 1978 and a PhD in Islamic culture in 1992 from the University of Karachi.

Khan had established an Islamic center in Lodi, California for young children. He, along with his teenage son were arrested and investigated by the US authorities and deported back in 2005. According to the Voice of America, "they were investigated in connection with possible terrorist activity and agreed to be deported in exchange for the government dropping charges that they misrepresented themselves when entering the country."

Khan was the general secretary of Jamia Farooqia seminary in Karachi from 1986 to 2010. He was the professor at the International Islamic University Malaysia from 2010 to 2018.

He returned to Pakistan after the death of his father Saleemullah Khan on 15 January 2017 and became the rector and a Professor of Hadīth at the Jamia Farooqia. Later, he entrusted his brother Ubaidullāh Khālid with the administration of the Shah Faisal Colony branch of the Farooqia seminary and himself associated with the seminary's Hub Chowki branch. (Note: The Jamia Farooqia seminary has two branches. One is located in the Shah Faisal Colony, and the other in Hub Chowki.) He wrote a book on the history of Pakistan.

In September 2020, Khan said in the "Azmat-e-Sahaba Conference" at Shahrah-e-Quaideen that the people who defame the companions of Muhammad should be booked under the Anti-Terrorism Act.

== Assassination ==
On 10 October 2020, while returning from the Jamia Darul Uloom, Karachi where he met Taqi Usmani, Khan had stopped his Toyota Vigo car near a shopping center in Shah Faisal Colony to purchase some sweets. (Note: According to police, Umair, who was accompanying Adil Khan survived the attack. Umair had gone outside to buy sweets while Adil Khan was sitting in the car.) Some unidentified gunmen opened fire on the car and fled.

He was shifted to Liaquat National Hospital, where he was pronounced dead on arrival. Saeed Ghani condemned the attack and expressed sorrow on Khan's death. Ghani said that, "the attack on the scholar was a "conspiracy to disturb the situation in Sindh, especially Karachi".

The Prime Minister of Pakistan, Imran Khan condemned the killing of Khan and accused India of creating Shia-Sunni division in Pakistan. The Chief of Army Staff, Pakistan, Qamar Javed Bajwa also condemned the assassination of Khān, terming it as "an attempt to foment unrest" by enemies of Pakistan.

=== Funeral ===
Khan's funeral prayer was offered in the Hub Chowki branch of Farooqia seminary on Sunday, 11 October 2020. It was led by his brother Ubaidullāh Khālid and attended by Rafi Usmani, Taqi Usmani, Muhammad Hanif Jalandhari, Awrangzib Faruqi, Abdul Ghafoor Haideri and Atā-ur-Rahmān. He was buried next to the grave of his father Saleemullah Khan.

=== Investigation ===
On 14 October 2020, the IGP Sindh formed a high level inquiry committee consisting of four members including Omer Shahid Hamid to probe the case. The committee is headed by the Additional IG of Karachi. According to The News International, Korangi police have made a sketch of one of the three suspects behind the assassination of Khān and his driver with the help of the witnesses and CCTV footages.

On 15 October 2020, home department of the Government of Sindh offered a reward of five million Pakistani rupees for any person giving information, and leading to arrest of the killers of Khān. Religious parties including Jamiat Ulema-e-Islam (F) and Jamiat Ulema-e-Islam (S) also announced a countrywide protest and strike to be observed on Friday, 16 October 2020.

A condolence ceremony was held at Jamia Farooqia on 22 Rabiʽ al-Thani 1442. It was attended by various scholars of Pakistan including Muhammad Taqi Usmani.

== Literary works ==
Khan's three books Knowledge and Civilization in Islam, Ethic and Fiqh for Everybody and The Islamic Wordview are part of the curriculum at the International Islamic University Malaysia. His other books include:

- Tārīkh Islāmi Jamhūriya-e-Pākistān
- Islām awr Tasawwur-e-Kā'ināt
- Islām awr Ikhlāqiyāt
- Ikkīswī Sadī mai Islām
- al-Maqālāt al-Mukhtārat fī al-Kitāb wa al-Sunnah
- Islam and Knowledge
- Islam awr Ethics

== See also ==
- List of Deobandis
