= Zar Wali Khan =

Pakistani Islamic scholar (1955–2020)

Mufti Sheikh al-Hadith Mohammad Zarwali Khan
- Succeeded by: Mufti Anwar Shah

Personal life
- Born: 13 May 1955 Jehangira, Khyber Pakhtunkhwa, Pakistan
- Died: 7 December 2020 (aged 65) Karachi, Sindh, Pakistan
- Main interests: Fiqh; Hadith; Tafsir
- Education: Jamia Uloom-ul-Islamia
- Occupation: Islamic Scholar; Writer; Mufti

Religious life
- Religion: Islam
- Denomination: Sunni
- Jurisprudence: Hanafi
- Movement: Deobandi

Muslim leader
- Teacher: Wali Hasan Tonki

Zarwali Khan (13 May 1955 – 7 December 2020), was a Pakistani Islamic scholar, writer and sermon preacher, who was the founder and principal of Jamia Ahsan Ul Uloom.

== Biography ==
Mufti Zar Wali Khan was born in Jehangira and studied at Jamia Uloom-ul-Islamia. He founded Jamia Arabia Ahsan Ul Uloom, Karachi in 1978. . Khan was known for his extensive teaching of Hadith, Fiqh, and Aqeedah at Jamia Arabia Ahsan-ul-Uloom. He delivered thousands of lectures during his lifetime, many of which were later distributed through recordings and online platforms. His lectures focused on Islamic jurisprudence, creed, spiritual reform, and contemporary issues facing the Muslim world. Khan's seminary was notable within the Deobandi movement for being one of the first traditional institutions to establish the Takhassus (a highly advanced, PhD-equivalent specialized research tier leading to official Mufti status) explicitly open to female Islamic scholars.

== Geopolitical engagement ==
Khan was a prominent regional voice against Western imperialism and advocated strongly for the implementation of strict Sharia. During the Soviet invasion of Afghanistan, he cooperated with Pakistani President Muhammad Zia-ul-Haq to support the Mujahideen. In his later career, he extended educational support to the Taliban movement, opening his seminary to Afghan students to ensure they received foundational theological instruction. In his public sermons, he frequently cited historical leaders like Saladin, Mahmud of Ghazni, Saddam Hussein and Mullah Omar as exemplary templates for Islamic leadership and unity

== Death ==
He died on 7 December 2020 at Indus Hospital in Karachi while under treatment for his ailments.

His death was condoled by Imran Ismail, Noor-ul-Haq Qadri, Rafi Usmani, Taqi Usmani, Fazal-ur-Rehman, Sirajul Haq and Abdur Razzaq Iskander.

According to Dawn, media reports said that Khan had died due to the COVID-19. However, Qari Usman, a leader of Jamiat Ulama-e-Islam rejected this claim and said that Khan was a chronic cardiac patient and did not die due to the coronavirus.

Khan's funeral prayer was held at Nasir Hussain Shaheed Park in Karachi. The exceptionally large turnout filled the park, overflowed into the surrounding Moti Mahal neighbourhood and adjacent back streets, and occupied nearby buildings, including all five floors of Jamia Arabia Ahsan-ul-Uloom. Many attendees walked alongside the funeral procession to Ahsan-ul-Madaris, where he was buried. Several roads in the vicinity were temporarily closed to facilitate the movement of the procession and accommodate the large crowds.

== See also ==
- List of Deobandis
