= Hafiz (Quran) =

Someone who has completely memorized the Quran

In Islam, a hafiz (/ˈhɑːfɪz/; Arabic: حافظ, romanized: ḥāfiẓ, pl. حُفَّاظ, ḥuffāẓ) is a person who has memorized the Qur'an. Hafiza (حافظة, ḥāfiẓa) is the female equivalent.

A hafiz has traditionally been highly respected by the community. A hafiz or hafiza are given titles such as "hafiz sahb" (sir hafiz), أُسْتَاذ, ustāḏ, 'teacher', and occasionally شَيْخ, shaykh, 'elder/Muslim scholar'.

== Qur'an ==
The Qur'an consists of 114 Surahs (chapters), 6,236 verses, and about 77,797 words in the original Classical Arabic.

== Importance ==
Hifz means memorization of the Quran. Hufaz names the Muslim belief that whoever memorizes the Quran and acts upon it will be rewarded and honoured by God. Abdullah ibn Amr narrated that Muhammad said: "It shall be said — meaning to the one who memorized the Qur'an — 'Recite, and rise up, recite (melodiously) as you would recite in the world. Indeed your rank shall be at the last Āyah you recited" (Jami` at-Tirmidhi 2914)

Having memorized the Quran, the hafiz or hafiza requires constant practice to ensure perfect retention in the long term. Yearly, thousands of students master and memorize the Quran.

In Pakistan, Muhammad Hanif Jalandhari, the general secretary of the Wafaq-ul-Madaris, a central board accounting for most religious seminaries in Pakistan that adhere to the Deobandi sect, says that in its network of madrasas, "one million children have become Hafiz-e-Quran (Hafiz of the Quran) after an exam was introduced in 1982", with more than 78,000 (including 14,000 girls) every year, which he compared to the yearly output of Saudi Arabia, at 5,000.

== Cultural differences ==
For Muslims attempting to memorize certain suwar but who are unfamiliar with the Arabic script, the ulama have made various elucidations. Opinions are mixed on the romanization of Arabic due to concerns about pronunciation. Writing systems with close consonantal and vocalic equivalents to classical Arabic or relevant and effective diacritics, and a preference for Quran tutors or recorded recitations from qurrāʾ or any device with clear audible sound storage technology such as CDs or cassettes offer alternative approaches.

In Iran, according to resolution 573 of the Supreme Council of the Cultural Revolution (SCCR), at least one specialized examination of the preservation of the Quran takes place each year, according to specific criteria. Dar al-Qur'an al-Karim reviews this evaluation. It is a subsidiary of the Islamic Advertising Organization. According to article 5 of the decree, holders of specialized qualifications for memorizing the Quran enjoy the benefits of one to five art degrees, subject to the approval of the 547th session of the SCCR. Therefore, the approval of the qualification degrees 1 to 5 of the Quran is in line with the doctoral, master's, bachelor's, associate's diploma, and diploma degrees, respectively.

== See also ==
- Halaqa
- Tajwid
- Tarteel
