= Habibullah Mukhtar =

Pakistani Islamic scholar

Maulana Dr. Habibullah Mukhtar Shaheed
- مولانا حبیب اللہ مختار

Personal life
- Born: 28 February 1944 Delhi
- Died: 2 November 1997 (aged 53) karachi
- Parent: Hakim Mukhtar Hassan Khan Hazeq (father)
- Education: Jamia Darul Uloom, Karachi; Jamia Uloom-ul-Islamia; University of Karachi; Islamic University of Madinah

Religious life
- Religion: Islam
- Denomination: Sunni
- Movement: Aalmi Majlis Tahaffuz Khatm-e-Nubuwwat
- Profession: Islamic Scholar, writer

Muslim leader
- Teacher: Yousuf Banuri, Wali Hasan Tonki, Abdul Rasheed Nomani, Muhammad Idrees Mirti

3rd chancellor of Jamia Uloom-ul-Islamia
- In office 1991–1997
- Preceded by: Mufti Ahmad Ur Rahman
- Succeeded by: Abdur Razzaq Iskander

5th General secretary of Wifaq ul Madaris Al-Arabia, Pakistan
- In office 29 April 1991 – 1 November 1997
- Preceded by: Mufti Ahmad Ur Rahman
- Succeeded by: Muhammad Hanif Jalandhari

Maulana Habibullah Mukhtar (Note: (Urdu: مولانا ڈاکٹر محمد حبیب اللہ مختار)) (28 February 1944 – 2 November 1997) was a Pakistani Islamic scholar and writer who served as chancellor of Jamia Uloom-ul-Islamia and general secretary of Wifaq ul Madaris Al-Arabia, Pakistan.

== Early life and education ==
Habibullah Mukhtar was born in 1944 to Hakim Mukhtar Hassan Khan in Delhi, British India. Upon the partition of India, at the age of three, he migrated from Delhi to Karachi with his family. He received his early religious education from Darul Uloom Karachi and Dars-i Nizami from Jamia Uloom-ul-Islamia in 1959. In 1966, on the behest of Muhammad Yousuf Banuri he entered to the Islamic University of Madinah and studied there for four years, and returned in 1970. Then he obtained his MA in Islamic Studies in 1973 and his Ph.D. from Karachi University in 1981. At the same time, he continued teaching and practice at Darul Iftaa Jamia Uloom-ul-Islamia.

== Career ==
From the earliest to the last major book of Dars-e-Nizami Sahih Bukhari Sharif, every important book was under his tutelage at Jamia Uloom-ul-Islamia. In 1991, after the demise of Maulana Mufti Ahmad-ur-Rehman, the second chancellor of the Jamia, by mutual consent Maulana Habibullah Mukhtar was given the responsibility. At the same time, the position of the General Secretary of Wifaq ul Madaris Al-Arabia, Pakistan was also vacant. Maulana Habibullah Mukhtar was also elected to take charge of this position.

== Literary works ==
He authored many books and also translated dozens of Arabic books into Urdu. including;

- Bringing up children in Islam
- Yaqeen wa Imaan
- Momin ka Hathyar

== Death ==
Mukhtar was shot dead on 2 November 1997, along with his driver Muhammad Tahir. He was laid to rest in the premises of Jamia Banuri Town next to his Shaykh and mentor Allama Banuri and Mufti Ahmad-ur-Rehman.

== See also ==
- List of Deobandis
