= Bayyināt =

Monthly Arabic Islamic journal published by Jamia Uloom-ul-Islamia

- Language: Urdu

Publication details
- Publisher: Jamia Uloom-ul-Islamia (Pakistan)

Standard abbreviations
- ISO 4: Bayyināt

Links
- Journal homepage

Bayyināt (Urdu: بینات, lit. 'Clear Proofs') is the monthly journal of Jamia Uloom-ul-Islamia. Its Arabic version is also published under the title of Al-Bayyinat. Its came into print in November 1962. Its the projection of Deobandi Ulama's religious authority in Pakistan. Apart from glorifying the ulama of its parent madrasah, It has published articles against Shias and Ahmadiyya on the one hand and against mainstream customs, education and politics of Pakistan on the other.

== History ==
The first issue of Bayyināt came into circulation under the editorial-ship of Abdul Rasheed Nomani. Numani remained as the editor of the journal till December 1963, after which Muhammad Yusuf Banuri took over the duties until his demise in 1977. A separate department, Shuba-i Tasnif was established in the Jamia Uloomul Islamia and delegated the responsibility for the publication of Bayyināt. In 1962 the annual subscription fee was a mere six rupees, fifty paisa for each month, and by 1977 the annual fee had increased to fifteen rupees, one rupee and fifty paisa for each copy of Bayyināt. Even though the price doubled from 1962 to 1977, it is nevertheless cheaply priced. The journal was issued on the 7th of each month of the Gregorian calendar. On average each copy of Bayyināt ran between fifty and eighty pages, however the special edition in memorial of Yusuf Banuri went over eight hundred pages, and contained black and white photographs of the Jamia Uloomul Islamia. The first few issues consistently promoted a book titled "Parwez Kafir He" (Parwez is an infidel) with point form description of the book.

== See More ==
- Al-Daie
- Al-Kifah
