= Jamia Khairul Madaris =

Islamic seminary in Multan, Pakistan

- جامعہ خیرالمدارس ملتان
- Type: Islamic university
- Established: 9 March 1931 (95 years ago)
- Founders: Khair Muhammad Jalandhari
- Affiliations: Wifaq al-Madaris al-`Arabiyah, Pakistan
- Rector: Muhammad Hanif Jalandhari
- Location: Auranzeb Road, o/s Dehli Gate, Multan, Punjab, Pakistan
- Website: khairulmadaris.com.pk

Jamia Khairul Madaris (Urdu: جامعہ خیرالمدارس) is an Islamic seminary located in the Pakistani city of Multan. Originally established in Jalandhar on 9 March 1931, the seminary moved to its current location in Multan on 8 October 1947.

== History ==
Khairul Madaris was originally established in Jalandhar on 9 March 1931 by Khair Muhammad Jalandhari at the suggestion of Ashraf Ali Thanwi. Thanwi also became first patron of Khairul Madaris, and the later patrons included Shabbir Ahmad Usmani and Shamsul Haq Afghani. It was re-established in Multan on 8 October 1947. The first executive council of the seminary included Muhammad Shafi, Muhammad Idris Kandhlawi, Zafar Ahmad Usmani and Shamsul Haq Afghani.

Along with Islamic education, Jamia offers formal education up to matriculation as well as computer education. One of its branches, Al-Khair Public School, offers 'O' Level and A-Level education in addition to Hifz-e-Quran. The seminary opened a female wing in 1970.

== Alumni ==
Alumni include:

- Hafez Ahmadullah
