= Ibn al-Jazari =

Islamic scholar (1350–1429)

Imam Ibn al-Jazari ابن الجزري
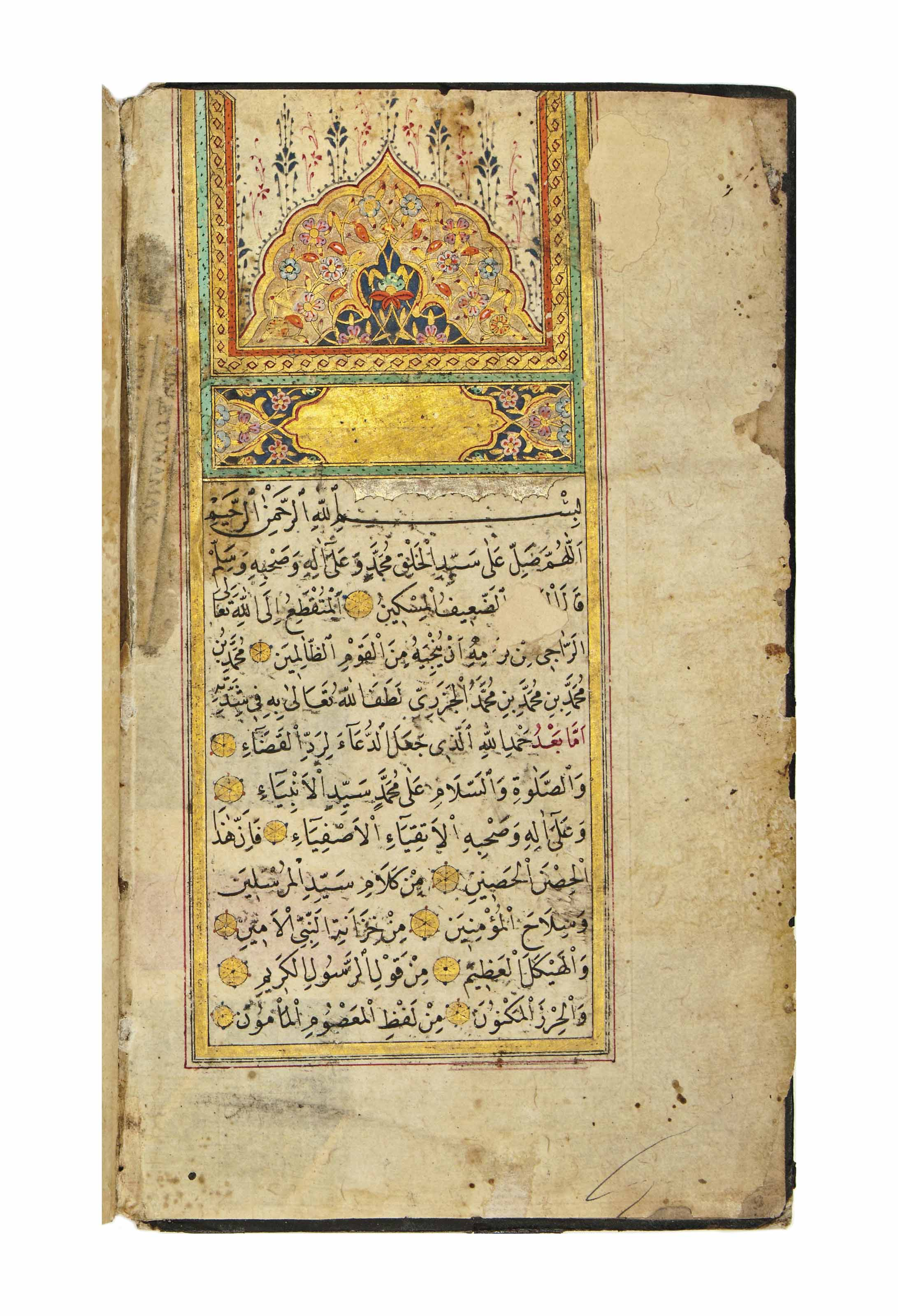
- Manuscript of a religious treatise by al-Jazari (al-Husn al-Hasin), after al-Bukhari's Sahih. Copy created in Ottoman Turkey, dated 1761-2
- Title: Shaykh al-Qurrāʼ; Muqriʼ al-Mamālīk; Al-Imām al-Aʻẓam; Shams al-Din; Al-Hafiz

Personal life
- Born: 26 November 1350; 25 Ramadan 751 AH Damascus, Syria
- Died: 2 December 1429; 5 Rabi' al-awwal 833 AH (aged 79) Shiraz, Iran
- Era: Middle Ages
- Region: Middle East
- Main interest(s): Qira'at, Tajwid, Hadith, History, Fiqh, Arabic
- Occupation: Scholar, Reciter, Traditionist, Historian, Jurist, Grammarian, Linguist

Religious life
- Religion: Islam
- Denomination: Sunni
- Jurisprudence: Shafi'i
- Creed: Ash'ari

Muslim leader
- Influenced by: Al-Shafi'i Abu Hasan al-Ash'ari Abu al-Qasim al-Shatibi Ibn Kathir Jamal al-Din al-Isnawi Siraj al-Din al-Bulqini

Abu al-Khayr Shams al-Din Muhammad ibn Muhammad ibn Muhammad ibn Ali ibn Yusuf al-Jazari (Arabic: أبو الخير شمس الدين محمد بن محمد بن محمد بن علي بن يوسف الجزري, 26 November 1350 – 2 December 1429), also known as Ibn al-Jazari (Arabic: ابن الجزري) was one of the prominent scholars of the late 14th and early 15th centuries, and is considered one of the greatest Quranic reciters in Islamic History. He was a distinguished and prolific scholar in the field of the qira'at of the Quran to whom al-Suyuti regarded as the "ultimate authority on these matters". His works on tajwid and qira'at are considered classics. He was a noted authority in hadith science, Islamic jurisprudence, history, and Arabic.

== Name ==
The nisba (attributive title), Jazari, denotes an origin from Jazirat ibn 'Umar.

== Biography ==
Al-Jazari was born in Damascus on Friday 26 November 1350 (25 Ramadan 751 AH). By the time he was fifteen or sixteen years old, he had not only learnt the entire Qur'an by heart, but also the well-known Shafi'ī law book Tanbīh and two works on qirā’ah, the Shātibiyyah and al-Taysīr. Among his teachers were Shaykh Ibn al-Labbān, Ibn al-Husayn al-Hanafi, and Taqi al-Dīn al-Baghdādi. He studied Shafi'i jurisprudence under Jamal al-Din al-Isnawi, Siraj al-Din al-Bulqini, Ibn Raslan, and Abu al-Baqa al-Subki. His Hadith instructors included, among others, Allāmah Ibn Kathīr, Bahāuddīn Amīnī, Ibn al-Muhibb al-Maqdisi, and Ibn Abd al-Karīm al-Hanbali. The scholar, Tāsh Kubrā Zādah stated, “He learnt Hadith from a cohort of scholars.”

Imam al-Jazari was noted to have memorized over 100,000 Hadiths, along with acquiring mastery in Hadith, law, and qirā'āh. Al-Sakhawi mentions, “Many scholars had granted him licenses to issue legal verdicts, lecturing, and teaching the sciences of qirā'ah.”

He travelled to Damascus, Mecca, Medina, Cairo, Alexandria, and studied the sciences of qira'at from about 40 experts. Following that, he was chosen to hold the position of Shaykh al-Qurrā in Damascus. The Levant was then a province of the Egyptian monarchy. Imam al-Jazari was appointed as the head of the educational department of al-Jāmi’ah al-Salāhiyyah by Sultan Barqūq, the monarch of Egypt.

He was appointed Qādī (judge) of Shām in 797 AH by Amīr Altamash, the ruler of the Levant. However, Imam al-Jazari disagreed with the administration on significant issues pertaining to the judicial position. Furthermore, the central authority started to mistreat him as a result of the planning of some people who were jealous of him. He ultimately made the decision to relocate from Damascus to Bursa in present-day Turkey. Knowing Imam al-Jazari well, the Turkish king, Bayezid I, treated him with immense honour and respect. He asked Imam al-Jazari to settle down in Bursa permanently, and Imam al-Jazari agreed. The results of his publications and talks started to emerge after that. He was a great asset to those who appreciated his knowledge, particularly the qirā'ah students.

Timur had set out to conquer Turkey in 805 AH with the intention of toppling the Bāyazīd government. Bayezid I was captured and after being detained, Bayezid passed away in custody. In addition to accumulating wealth and treasure, Timur was keen to bring together leading authorities from a range of disciplines and sciences to his realm in Samarqand. Timur dutifully arranged for Imam al-Jazari and a few other chosen scholars to accompany him on his journey. He brought them with him to Transoxiana's major cities of education, right in the middle of the royal army. Once they had read Imam Jazari's published works, they were much more appreciative of his wisdom and saw it as a tremendous blessing. This was at the time when Imam al-Jazari was visiting these cities. Timur held Imam al-Jazari in high regard and had faith in him. He believed that Imam al-Jazari "was a person who would experience clairvoyance (kashf) and would be blessed with visions of the Prophet sallallahu `alayhi wa sallam whenever he wished."

Following Timur's death in 807 AH, Imam al-Jazari travelled via Khorasan, Herat, Yazd, and Isfahan on his way to Shiraz. In 808 AH, he arrived in Shiraz. Pīr Muhammad, the Shiraz governor and Timur's paternal grandson, was deeply convinced of and respected Imam Jazari. He gave Imam Jazari the mandate to remain in Shiraz and elevated him to the rank of Chief Judge. In 827 AH, Imam al-Jazari left Shiraz for the Hajj pilgrimage following a protracted stay there. Following the Hajj, he journeyed to Cairo, where he was visited by scholars and pupils from distant locations. In Cairo, hordes of Qurrā and scholars could be seen, all hoping to get Ijazah from him. A youthful Ibn Hajr al-Asqalani, who would later become the well-known author of Fath al-Bari, was among these groups of experts. Furthermore, Imam al-Jazari gave ijāzāt and gave lessons on the Musnad Ahmad, Musnad al-Shafi'i, and other books. Ibn al-Jazari taught several students including Sidi Boushaki (1394-1453)

Upon his return to Shiraz, Imam al-Jazari established Dār al-Qur'ān, a sizable seminary. He had already founded a seminary with the same name in Damascus. This seminary is sometimes incorrectly called "Dār al-Qurrā". Al-Jazari died at the age of 79 on Friday 2 December 1429 (5 Rabi' al-awwal 833 AH) in Shiraz, Iran. He was buried inside the Dār al-Qur'ān seminary's walls.

== Reception ==
From his era till now, none has reached the level of Imam al-Jazari in the sciences of qira'at. Ibn Hajar al-Asqalani said, “He held the highest position in the world in the science of qirā'ah.”

Al-Suyuti said: “When it came to the science of qirā’ah he was unparalleled in the world during his time, and he was a hāfiž of Hadith.”

Al-Shawkani said: “He was unmatched in the science of qirā’ah in the entire world.”

Abd al-Hayy al-Lucknawi said: “Amongst the glorious personalities of Islam in the 8th century were Zain al-Din al-'Iraqi, Shams al-Dīn Jazari, and Siraj al-Din al-Bulqini.”

== Selected works ==
Al-Jazari compiled more than 90 works on qira'at (readings), ḥadīth (traditions), ta’rīkh (history) and other disciplines. These include:

- Taḥbīr al-taysīr fī qirāʼāt al-ʻashr (تحبير التيسير في قراءات العشر)
- Taqrīb al-Nashr fī al-qirāʼāt al-ʻashr (تقريب النشر في القراءات العشر)
- Al-Tamhīd fī ʻilm al-tajwīd (التمهيد في علم التجويد)
- Ṭayyibat al-nashr fī al-qirāʼāt al-ʻashr (طيبة النشر في القراءات العشر)
- Munjid al-Muqriʼīn wa-murshid al-ṭālibīn (منجد المقرئين ومرشد الطالبين)
- Ghāyat al-Nihāyah fī Ṭabaqāt al-Qurrāʻ (غاية النهاية في طبقات القرآء) Lexicon of the Holy Qur’ān’s Reciters

== See also ==
- List of Ash'aris
- Ten recitations
- Seven readers
