= Jehangira =

Jahangīra
- Location within Khyber Pakhtunkhwa Location within Pakistan
- Coordinates: 33.57°N 72.13°E
- Country: Pakistan
- Province: Khyber-Pakhtunkhwa
- Elevation: 281 m (922 ft)

Population (2023 census)
  - Total: 57,011
- Time zone: UTC+5 (PST)

Jehangira (Urdu: جہانگیرا) is a town in the District Swabi, Khyber-Pakhtunkhwa province of Pakistan.

== Overview and history ==
According to 1870-72 land management records, when the area was under the control of the Afzal Khan Khattak Grand Son of Khushal Khan Khattak, he awarded jehangira village to inhabitants of that time for their service and loyalty which is mentioned in 1870 jehangira land and owners record. The place was known as Jehangir khan but over time came to be known by the current name of Jehangira.

In 1818, during Ranjit Singh's invasion of the Peshawar Valley, Jehangira was badly damaged by the Sikhs. The Sikhs built an army post inside Jehangira in order to control the area and launched a boat service across the river to connect it with Peshawar.

In the aftermath of the Second Anglo-Sikh War, the area came under British rule in March 1849 and the region became part of British India. Under British colonialism, the residents built a checkpoint and a police station on the bank of Kabul River as well as a floating bridge over the river. After the independence of Pakistan from British rule in 1956, the local government has used the former British checkpoint as a police station.

In 1970, a reinforced hollow-core concrete bridge was constructed over the river, now known as Jehangira bridge. During a period of flooding in July 2010, the bridge was submerged under water for several hours.

As time passed, the village's population increased and it started to grow into adjacent populated areas. Many new markets and industries emerged in the area and some people started to refer to the entire municipal area as "Jehangira town".

Jehangira divided into two municipal governments under two different districts: Eastern Jehangira (under the Swabi district) and Western Jehangira which is Tehsil (under the Nowshera District).

== Boundaries ==
The mountains of Khawri behind the Jehangira Railway station form the western boundary of Jehangira. The southern shore of the Indus River is the border with Punjab, Pakistan. To the east are Tordhair town and Ala Dher Village and on the northern border are the villages of Mian-Esa and Jalbai.

== Climate ==
The climate of Jehangira is similar to that of Islamabad, although sometimes more humid due to the Kabul and Indus Rivers. In the summer, the chain of mountains and desolate areas to the northwest can cause hot and dusty winds.

== Demographics ==
=== Population ===
Historical population
Year	Pop.	±% p.a.
1951	...	—
1961	3,501	—
1972	3,564	+0.16%
1981	18,076	+19.77%
1998	31,115	+3.25%
2017	53,109	+2.85%
2023	57,011	+1.19%

The population of city in 1972 was 3,564 but according to the 2023 Census of Pakistan, the population has risen to 57,011.

== People and cultures ==
Some locations of note within Jehangira:

- Jehangira village (Swabi district): This place is also known as Pushtoon's village because of the usage of the Pushto language
- Mardgan village (Swabi district): This area was settled by Sikh-Raj in 1818 for the purpose of providing boating services on the Kabul River - "Mardgan" is a Pushto word that means "boatmen" or "sailors".
- Ala Dher Village

== Notable people ==
- Abbas Khattak Chief of Air staff 8 November 1994 – 7 November 1997.
- Zar Wali Khan founder of Jamia Arabia Ahsan Uloom Karachi

== Mausoleums and cemeteries ==
About 250 acres (1.0 km^{2}) of the area consists of graveyards, mostly at the eastern part of town. Some graves of note:

- The tomb of Badu Baba, in the north-east
- The tomb of Lakai Bebyane, in the south
- The tomb of Sheikh Baba, on the eastern bank of Kabul river
- Garra Qabristan
- Adam Baba Muqbara
- Muhabbat Pur Muqbara
- Tumb Of Khan Bahadur Risaldar Fateh Khan Khattak
- An urs is celebrated annually on the 12th of Rabi Alawal on his Mazzar under the supervision of Alaf din awan .

== Tourism ==
Kund Park
