= Hasanpur Luhari =

Village in Uttar Pradesh, India

Hasanpur Luhari is a village in the Shamli district of the Indian state of Uttar Pradesh. It is a historical village situated 6 km away from the Delhi–Saharanpur road and 27 km from Muzaffarnagar. It has fertile agricultural land used to grow sugarcane and grains.

Educational institutes include Adarsh Janta Uchtar Vidyalaya and Vishvkarma Inter College. The village has a branch of the State Bank of India. The main industry of this village is agriculture, but some people have service sector jobs such as retail marketing. Police Station is Thanabhawan.

Nearby towns include Thana Bhawan; Jalalabad, Muzaffarnagar; Shamli; and Charthawal.
