= Abu al-Qasim al-Shatibi =

Islamic scholar

- Born: Abū Muḥammad al-Qāsim ibn Fīrruh ibn Khalaf ibn Aḥmad al-Ruʿaynī al-Shāṭibī; 538 AH / 1144 CE; Xàtiva, Sharq al-Andalus (modern day País Valencià, Spain)
- Died: 22 Jumada al-Thani 590 AH / 1194 CE; Egypt
- Occupation: Islamic scholar
- Notable work: Ḥirz al-amānī wa-wajh al-tahānī (commonly known as Matn al-Shāṭibīyah), Aqīlat atrāb al-qaṣāʼid fī asná al-maqāṣid, Nāzimatuz-zuhr, Qasīdah Dāliyah

Abū Muḥammad al-Qāsim ibn Fīrruh ibn Khalaf ibn Aḥmad al-Ruʿaynī al-Shāṭibī (Arabic: أبو محمد القاسم بن فِيرُّه بن خلف بن أحمد الرعيني الشاطبي), 538–590 AH / 1144–1194 CE, was an Islamic scholar from Xàtiva (then in شرق الأندلس or Sharq al-Andalus; modern day País Valencià, Spain) who worked in the field of qira'at, Qur'an recitation methods.

== Life and works ==
Al-Shatibi was born in 538 AH in al-Andalus (Islamic Iberia). He moved to Egypt in 574 AH where he died on 22 Jumada al-Thani 590 AH. He authored Ḥirz al-amānī wa-wajh al-tahānī, commonly known as Matn al-Shāṭibīyah. The Pakistani scholar Fateh Muhammad Panipati wrote a commentary on it entitled Inayate Rahmani. His other books include:

- Aqīlat atrāb al-qaṣāʼid fī asná al-maqāṣid
- Nāzimatuz-zuhr
- Qasīdah Dāliyah
