= Yusuf Banuri =

Sunni Deobandi Islamic scholar (1908–1977)

Allama Sheikh-ul-Hadith Sheikh-ut-Tafseer Muhammad Yousuf Banuri
- محمد یوسف بنوری

1st Chancellor of Jamia Uloom-ul-Islamia
- In office 1954 – 17 October 1977
- Preceded by: None (office created)
- Succeeded by: Mufti Ahmad Ur Rahman

3rd President of Wifaq ul Madaris Al-Arabia, Pakistan
- In office 30 May 1973 – 17 October 1977
- Preceded by: Khair Muhammad Jalandhari
- Succeeded by: Mufti Mahmud

2nd Vice President of Wifaq ul Madaris Al-Arabia, Pakistan
- In office 19 October 1959 – 30 May 1973
- Preceded by: Khair Muhammad Jalandhari
- Succeeded by: Muhammad Shafi Sargodhi

5th Emir of Aalmi Majlis Tahaffuz Khatm-e-Nubuwwat
- In office 1974–1977
- Preceded by: Maulana Muhammad Hayat (acting)
- Succeeded by: Khawaja Khan Muhammad

Personal life
- Born: 7 May 1908 Mohabat Abad, NWFP, British India
- Died: 17 October 1977 (aged 69) Rawalpindi, Punjab, Pakistan
- Home town: Mardan
- Education: Darul Uloom Deoband; Jamiah Islamiah Talimuddin Dabhel
- Known for: Maarif al-Sunan sharh Sunan al-Tirmidhi
- Relatives: Anwar Badakhshani (Son in law)

Religious life
- Religion: Islam
- Denomination: Sunni
- Institute: Jamia Islamia Talimuddin; Jamia Uloom-ul-Islamia
- Founder of: Jamia Uloom-ul-Islamia, Bayyinat
- Lineage: Sayyid
- Jurisprudence: Hanafi
- Creed: Maturidi
- Movement: Deobandi

Muslim leader
- Teacher: Anwar Shah Kashmiri; Shabbir Ahmad Usmani
- Students: Khawaja Khan Muhammad Mufti Zar Wali Khan Maulana Muhammad Abdullah Habibullah Mukhtar Abdus Salam Chatgami, Mahmudul Hasan

Sayyid Muhammad Yousuf Banuri (7 May 1908 – 17 October 1977) was a Pakistani Islamic scholar, who was the founder of Jamia Uloom-ul-Islamia and former President and Vice President of Wifaq-ul-Madaris al-Arabia, Pakistan from 30 May 1973 to 17 October 1977.

He also served as Emir of the Aalmi Majlis Tahaffuz Khatm-e-Nubuwwat from 1974 to 1977.

== Education and career ==
Yousuf Banuri received primary education from his father and maternal uncle. Then he went to Darul Uloom Deoband, India, for higher Islamic education. From Jamiah Islamiah Talimuddin Dabhel he completed his "Dora-e-Hadith" under Anwar Shah Kashmiri and Shabbir Ahmad Usmani. He served as "Sheikh-ul-Hadith" at Jamiah Islamiah Talimuddin Dabhel and as "Sheikh-ut-Tafseer" at Darul Uloom Tando Allahyar, Sindh. He founded Jamia Uloom-ul-Islamia in 1954.

== Banuri's writings ==
- Imam Tirmidhi's contribution towards Hadith, (Ma῾ārif al-Sunan) 1957
- Knowledge of the Sunnahs Introduction to the knowledge of the Sunnahs
- Sunan knowledge
- Fayd Al-Bari explained Sahih Al-Bukhari
- Glory Al-Darari Explanation of Sahih Bukhari
- Atonement for atheists in the necessities of religion
- The doctrine of Islam in the life of Jesus
- Unrepentant in the provisions of the kiss and niches
- A whiff of amber in the life of the imam of the era, Sheikh Anwar
- Professor Mawdudi and some of his life and ideas
- An orphan of the statement in the problems of the Qur'an
- Harness the beings of Ur Islam
- The position of the Islamic nation on the Qadianis
- Yatimatul Bayan

== Death ==
Yousuf Banuri was attending a meeting of Islami Mushawarati Council at Islamabad. His health worsened there and he was rushed to Combined Military Hospital Rawalpindi were his health worsened over two days. Muhammad Yousuf Banuri died on 17 October 1977. At his last breath, he recited the Kalimah Tayyibah with "Assalam-o-Alaikum" to the Attentive at hospital and turned himself towards Qibla. His body was returned to Karachi. Dr. Abdul Hai Aarifi led the funeral prayer and was laid to rest in the Jamia Uloom-ul-Islamia among thousands of people, Ulama, devotees, followers and students.

== Legacy ==
A residential and commercial town in Karachi, originally named "New Town". It was renamed Allama Banuri Town in honor of Banori.

== Bibliography ==
- Qazi, Abdul Manan; Ghafoor, Hafiz Abdul (2020). "The Role and Leadership qualities of Maulana Muhammad Yousaf Banuri during the Movement towards Finality of Prophet hood (Khate-e-Nabuwat): A Research Review". Hazaraislamicus. 9 (02): 21–32. ISSN 2410-8065.
- Baxriddinovich, Ilhom Abdusattorov (2023). "The Role Of Muhammad Yusuf Banuri In The Development Of Islamic Sciences". International Journal of Education, Social Science & Humanities. Finland Academic Research Science Publishers. 11 (5): 54–58. doi:10.5281/zenodo.8017187. Archived from the original on 12 June 2023.
- Ahmed, Khalil; Ahmed, Sardar; Khan, Ismail (2020). "The Role Of Allama Muhammad Yusuf Banuri In The Arabic Poetry". The International Research Journal of Usooluddin (in Arabic). 4 (2): 01–08. ISSN 2664-4940.
