= Jamia Farooqia =

Islamic seminary in Pakistan

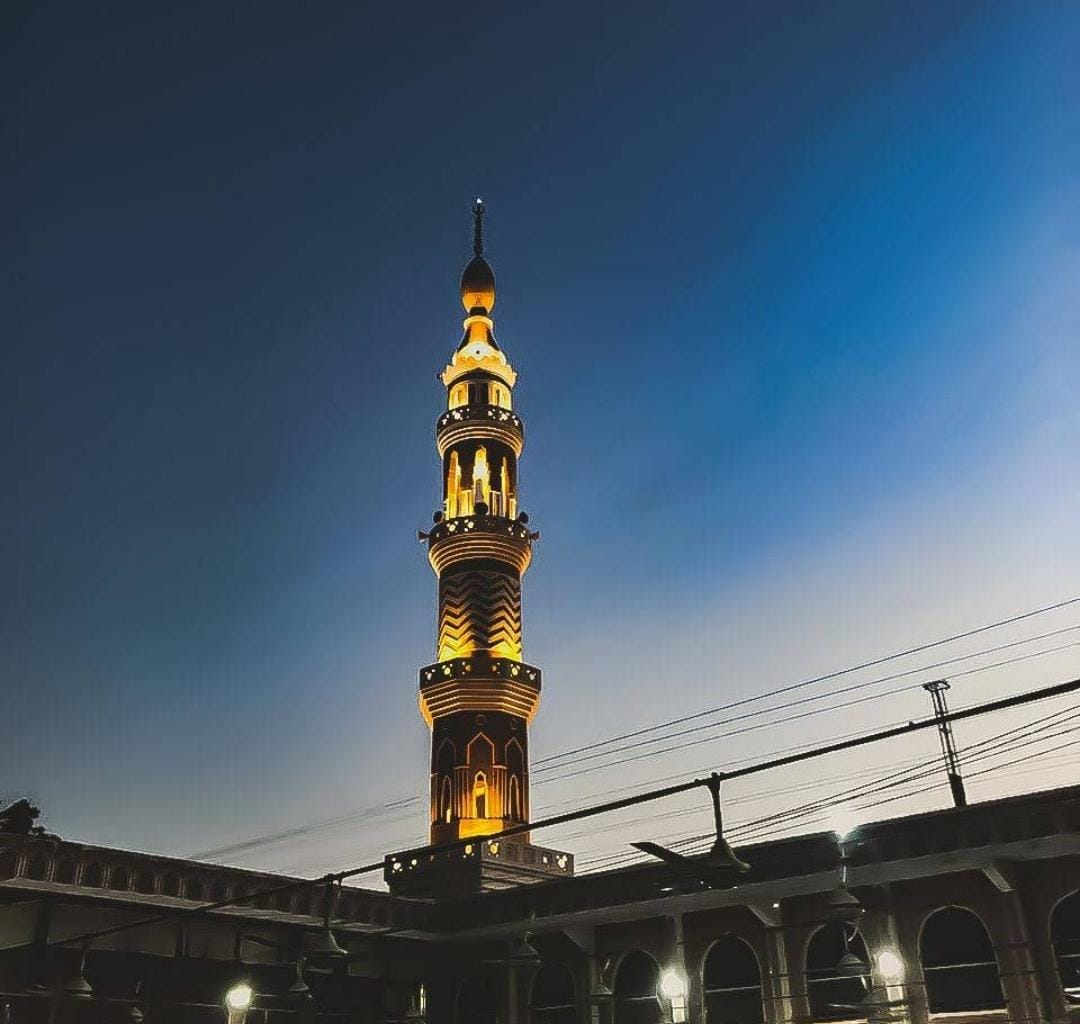
- Type: Islamic university
- Established: 1967 (59 years ago)
- Founder: Saleemullah Khan
- Rector: Muhammad Adil Khan (d. 10 October 2020)
- Students: 27000
- Location: Shah Faisal Colony, Karachi; Hub Chowki, Lasbela, Balochistan
- Website: farooqia.com

Jamia Farooqia is an Islamic seminary in Pakistan, having two branches, one located in the Shah Faisal Colony in Karachi, and the other in Hub Chowki.

Established in 1967 by Saleemullah Khan, an alumnus of Darul Uloom Deoband, the seminary has over 2300 students.

== History ==
Jamia Farooqia was established in 1967 by Saleemullah Khan. The seminary has two branches, one located in the Shah Faisal Colony, and the other in Hub Chowki.

The seminary was headed by Saleemullah Khan until his death on 15 January 2017. He was succeeded by his son Muhammad Adil Khan.

Nizamuddin Shamzai who taught in the seminary for twenty years, was assassinated on 30 May 2004.

== Magazine ==
Al-Farooq is a monthly magazine published by the Jamia in four languages Urdu, Arabic, Sindhi and English.

== Alumni ==
- Nizamuddin Shamzai
- Abdul Aziz Ghazi
- Manzoor Mengal
- Awrangzib Faruqi
- Muhammad Adil Khan
- Qari Hussain
