= Liaquat National Memorial Library =

Public library in Karachi, Pakistan

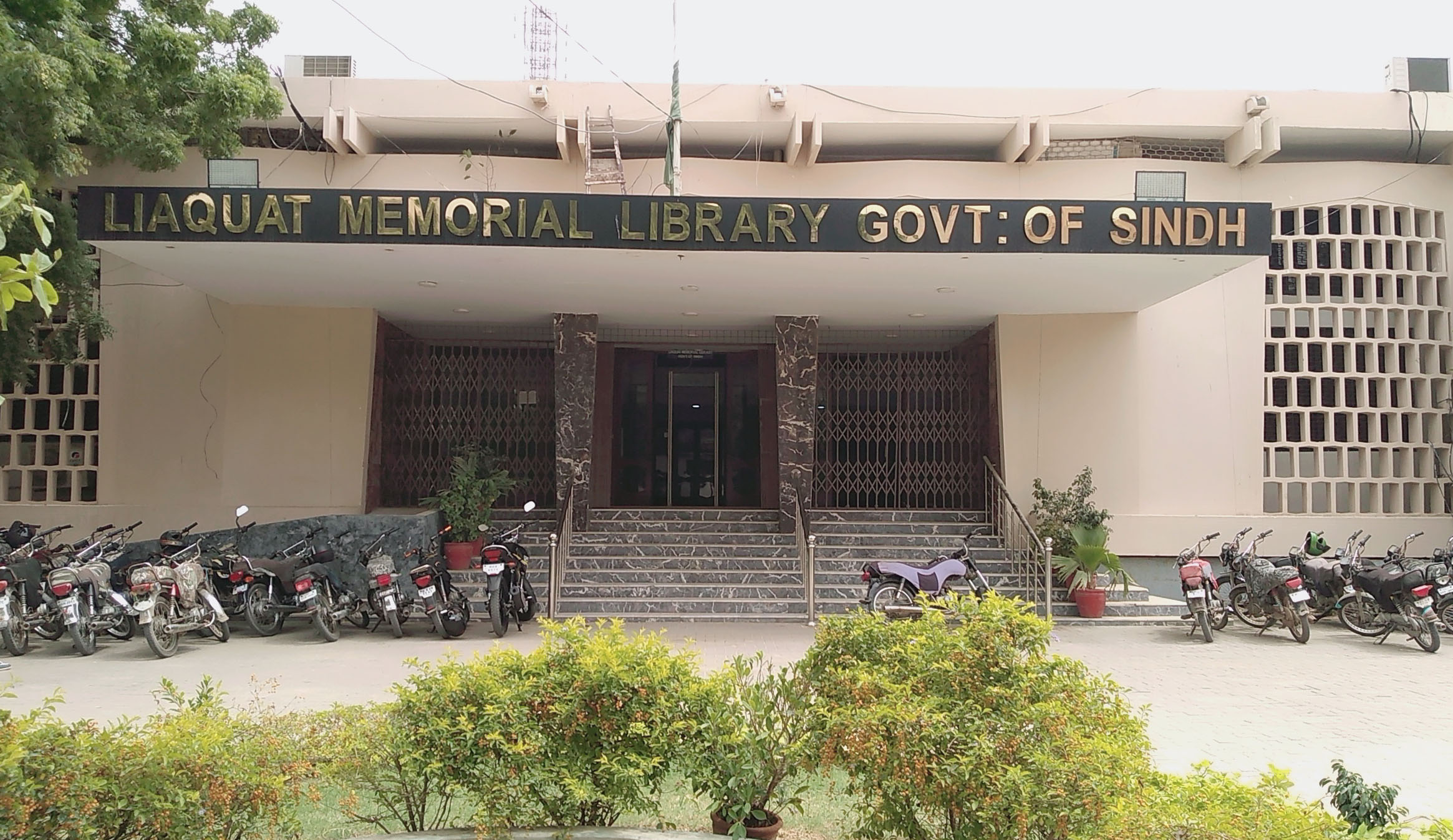
Entrance of the Liaquat Memorial Library, Govt. of Sindh

The Liaquat National Memorial Library (کتاب خانہ یادگار قومی لیاقت)is a public library located at the Stadium Road in Karachi, Pakistan.

== History ==
The National Library of Pakistan was established in 1951 as a branch directorate. In the year 1954, the Liaquat Memorial Library was constructed by Haji Illyas Hassan Mughal bery famous architecture of that time. The Liaquat Memorial Library declared a legal depository under the Copyright Law. This library continued to function of the National Library until 1986. Over a short span of few years the library has acquired numerous collections through purchases, copyright deposits, gifts, exchanges, and donations. The library has total holdings of 144,000 volumes (73,000 English and European Languages, 40,000 Oriental Languages).

Liaquat Memorial Library has been serving the nation for over fifty years and its collection of over 150,000 reading materials can now be searched online. The library has the biggest collection among the public libraries of the country. Liaquat Memorial Library holds thousands of volumes of books and other reading materials. Library is intended to be a reference library for all purposes, a working place for scholars, postgraduate students of social sciences and humanities and repository of national published literature for future historians.

== Lincoln Corners ==
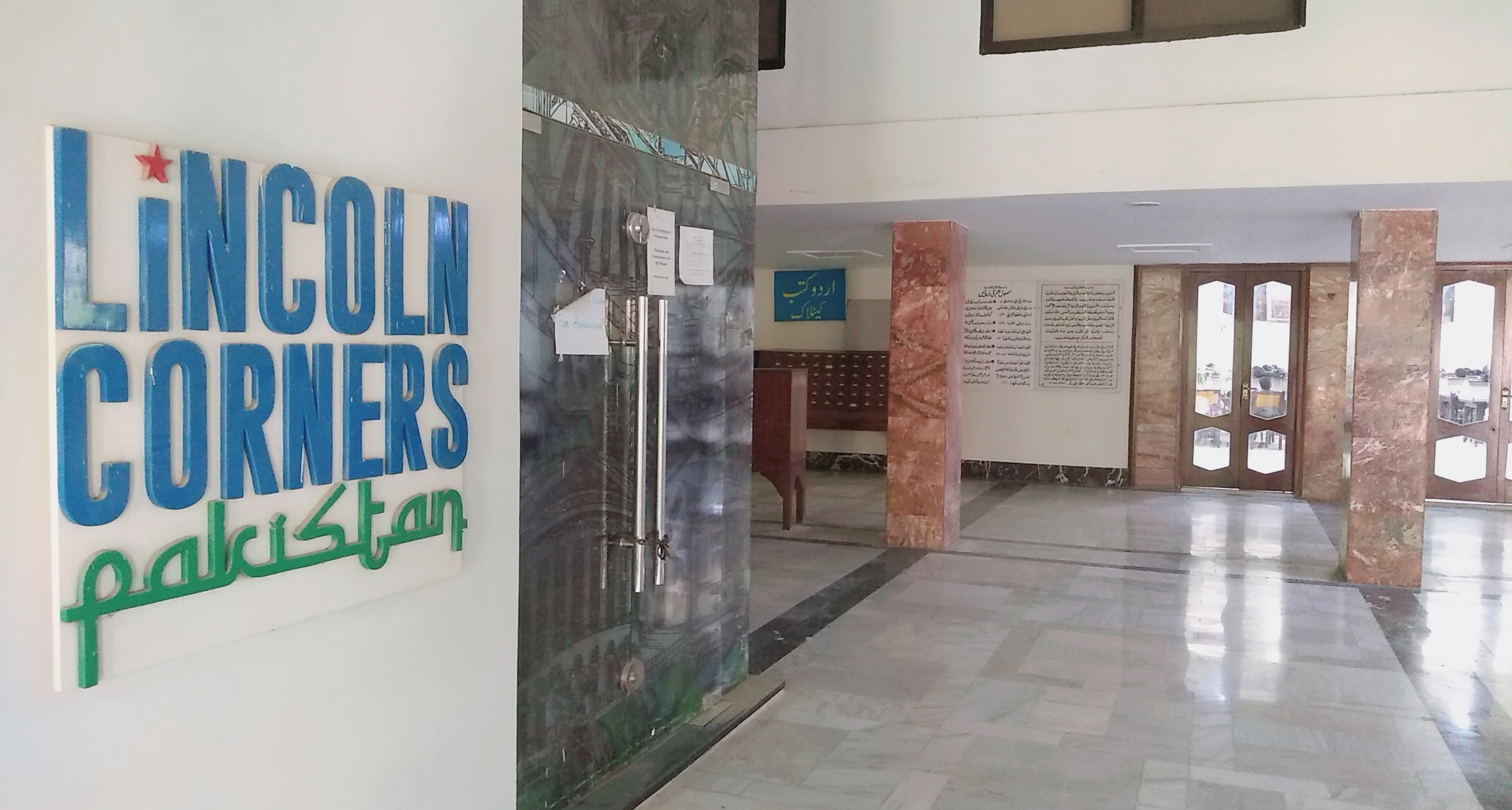
Liaqaut Memorial Library presents the Pakistani Center of an International Institution, the Lincoln Corners,

The library is a pakistani chapter to The Lincoln Corners; an Institution promoting the scholarships & educational gatherings naming it after Abraham Lincoln, the 16th President of the United States and a leader who promoted the values of equality among the people as according to David Hale, the US ambassador to Pakistan, while explaining the significance of the name and inaugurating the opening of the Corners alongside the chief minister of Sindh. The Library's director Bashir Abro further added, “We plan to have more libraries at the union council level to enhance reading habits,” said Abro, adding that there is a dire need for promoting a reading culture in our society. “I see the youth taking notes from their own books rather than using the reference books placed in this library”. Lincoln Corner (LCK) is managed by Pakistan American Cultural Center PACC.
