= Wali Hasan Tonki =

Pakistani grand mufti and Islamic scholar

- مفتی ولی حسن ٹونکیؒ

1st President of Iqra Rozatul Atfal Trust
- In office April 1984 – unknown
- Preceded by: None (office created)
- Succeeded by: Muhammad Yusuf Ludhianvi

Personal life
- Born: 1924 Tonk, Tonk State, British India
- Died: 3 February 1995 (aged 70–71) Karachi, Sindh, Pakistan
- Resting place: Darul Uloom Korangi Cemetery
- Education: University of Allahabad; Panjab University; Mazahir Uloom; Darul Uloom Deoband; Darul Uloom Nadwatul Ulama

Religious life
- Religion: Islam
- Denomination: Sunni
- Institute: Darul Uloom Karachi; Jamia Uloom-ul-Islamia
- Jurisprudence: Hanafi
- Movement: Deobandi

Muslim leader
- Teacher: Hussain Ahmad Madani; Abdul Haq Akorwi
- Students: Taqi Usmani Rafi Usmani Zar Wali Khan Habibullah Mukhtar Mufti Muhammad Naeem Abu Lubaba Shah Mansour Muzammil Hussain Kapadia, Mahmudul Hasan Inam-Ul-Haq Qasmi, Hifzur Rahman

Wali Hasan Tonki (Urdu: مفتی ولی حسن ٹونکیؒ; 1924 – 3 February 1995) was a Pakistani Islamic scholar and Mufti jurist.

== Early life and education ==
Wali Hasan was born in 1924 to Mufti Anwarul Hassan Khan in Tonk district. His father and grandfather, Muhammad Hassan Khan were muftis in the Sharia Court of Tonk. He studied Persian and other books of Arabic from his father. His father died when he was 11. In 1936 his paternal uncle Haider Hassan Khan took him to Darul-uloom Nadwatul Ulama and studied for four years. And then he studied random books from his paternal uncle in Tonk. After the death of his paternal uncle, he served for many years in the Sharia Court of Tonk. During this period, he passed the Maulvi examination from University of Allahabad and Maulvi Alam and Fazil from Panjab University. Then entered in Mazahir Uloom and complete Dars-i Nizami. Then he studied in Darul Uloom Deoband under Hussain Ahmad Madani.

== Career ==
After studies, he was appointed as Mufti and Judge in a Sharia court at Chhabra Gugor till the partition of India. He migrated to Pakistan and taught at Metropolis High School, Karachi. He later taught at the Madrasa Imdadul Uloom and at the Jamia Uloom-ul-Islamia.

He founded Iqra Rozatul Atfal Trust, and also served as its first president.

== Literary works ==
Tonki wrote books and his articles appeared in various journals. His books include:

- Tazkira Auliya i Hind wa Pakistan
- Aaili Qawaneen Shariat ki Roshni main
- Bima Ki Haqeeqat
- Qurbani Ke Ahkam Masail
- Fitna Inkar-e-Hadees

== Death ==
He died on Friday, 3 February 1995. His funeral prayers were led by Abdul Rasheed Nomani and according to his will, he was laid to rest in Darul Uloom Karachi cemetery.
