= Khair Muhammad Jalandhari =

Pakistani Muslim scholar (1895 - 1970)

Maulana Khair Muhammad Jalandhari
- خير محمّد جالندھرى

Personal life
- Born: 1895 Nakodar, Jalandhar India
- Died: 1970 (aged 74–75)
- Children: Muhammad Sharif Jalandhari
- Parent: Elahi Bakhsh (father)
- Political party: Jamiat Ulema-e-Islam
- Relatives: Muhammad Hanif Jalandhari (grandchild)

Religious life
- Religion: Islam
- Denomination: Sunni
- Institute: Jamia Khair-ul-Madaris
- Founder of: Jamia Khairul Madaris

Muslim leader
- Disciple of: Ashraf Ali Thanwi
- Students: Muhammad Ali Jalandhari

1st Muhtamim (principal) of Jamia Khair-ul-Madaris
- In office 1947–1975
- Preceded by: None (office created)
- Succeeded by: Muhammad Sharif Jalandhari

1st Vice-President of Wifaq ul Madaris Al-Arabia, Pakistan
- In office 19 October 1959 – 12 January 1963
- Preceded by: None (office created)
- Succeeded by: Muhammad Yousuf Banuri

2nd President of Wifaq ul Madaris Al-Arabia, Pakistan
- In office 12 January 1963 – 22 October 1970
- Preceded by: Shamsul Haq Afghani
- Succeeded by: Muhammad Yousuf Banuri

Khair Muhammad Jalandhari (1895–1970) (Urdu: مولانا خير محمّد جالندھرى) was a Pakistani Islamic scholar, founder and first rector Jamia Khairul Madaris. He served as president and vice-president of Wifaq ul Madaris Al-Arabia, Pakistan.

== Early life and education ==
Khair Muhammad Jalandhari was born in 1895 to Elahi Bakhsh in Nakodar, Jalandhar district India. He completed the Quran from Mian Imam Din and his maternal uncle Shah Muhammad. In 1905, he went to Madrasa Rasheedia in Nakodar and studied initial Persian books there. Then he continued his education at Madrasa Arabi Raipur, Madrasa Sabria Raipur in Gojran and Madrasa Manba ul Uloom Gulauthi, Bulandshahr. He joined Madarsa Isha Atul Uloom Bareilly in 1913 and graduated in traditional dars-e-nizami in 1917. There he studied under Muhammad Yasin Sirhindi, a student of Mahmud Hasan Deobandi.

Jalandhari was a disciple of Ashraf Ali Thanwi. He also served as a member of the governing body of Darul Uloom Deoband in May 1944 to 1947.

== Literary work ==
- Khair Ul Usool Fi Hadith Ur Rasool
- Aasar-e-Khair
- Khair ul Fatawa

== See also ==
- List of Deobandis

== Bibliography ==
- Rizwi, Syed Mehboob. Tarikh Darul Uloom Deoband [History of the Dar al-Ulum Deoband]. Vol. 2. Translated by Murtaz Husain F Quraishi (1981 ed.). Deoband: Darul Uloom Deoband.
