= Raipur Araian, Jalandhar =

Raipur Araian
- Village
- Country: India
- State: Punjab
- District: Jalandhar
- Tehsil: Nakodar

Government
  - Type: Panchayat raj
  - Body: Gram panchayat

Area
  - Total: 427 ha (1,060 acres)

Population (2011)
  - Total: 1,382; 703/679 ♂/♀
  - Scheduled Castes: 712; 342/370 ♂/♀
  - Total Households: 258

Languages
  - Official: Punjabi
- Time zone: UTC+5:30 (IST)
- ISO 3166 code: IN-PB
- Website: jalandhar.gov.in

Raipur Araian is a village in Nakodar in Jalandhar district of Punjab State, India. It is located 20 kilometres (12 mi) from sub district headquarter and 40 kilometres (25 mi) from district headquarter. The village is administrated by Sarpanch an elected representative of the village.

== Demography ==
As of 2011, the village has a total number of 258 houses and a population of 1,382 of which 703 are males while 679 are females. According to the report published by Census India in 2011, out of the total population of the village 712 people are from Schedule Caste and the village does not have any Schedule Tribe population so far.

== See also ==
- List of villages in India
