= Abdul Hakim Sialkoti =

Muslim scholar

Mulla Abdul Hakim Sialkoti
- ملا عبدالحکیم سیالکوٹی
- Title: Fazīl Lahorī; Aftāb-i-Panjāb

Personal life
- Born: c. 1580 Sialkot, Punjab, Mughal Empire
- Died: 1656 Sialkot, Punjab, Mughal Empire
- Era: Mughal India
- Main interest(s): Islamic Law, Islamic philosophy, Islamic metaphysics

Religious life
- Religion: Islam
- Denomination: Sunni
- Jurisprudence: Hanafi

Abdul Hakim Sialkoti (Punjabi: ملا عبدالحکیم سیالکوٹی, romanized: Mullā ʿAbd al-Ḥakīm Siyālkōtī; c. 1580 – 1656) was a Mughal-era Punjabi Muslim Islamic scholar, philosopher, theologian and metaphysician.

== Biography ==
Abdul Hakim Sialkoti was born in 988 AH/c. 1580 during the reign of Mughal Emperor Akbar into a weaver family from Sialkot. He was the son of Shaykh Shams al-Dīn, a religious scholar. Abdul Hakim received his early education from his father, and then studied under the renowned religious scholar of his time, Shaykh Kamāl al-Dīn (d. 1017 AH/ 1608), who was also the teacher of another well-known theologian, Ahmad Sirhindi. In his later life, Sialkoti became a disciple of Sirhindi as well.

During the reign of Akbar, Sialkoti taught in Lahore where he came to be known as Fazīl Lahorī. He had two notable class fellows, Ahmad Sirhindi and Nawab Sa'dullah Khan. When Sa'dullah Khan was appointed as vizier of Emperor Shah Jahān, Sialkoti was introduced to the emperor by the former who ordered him to be sent for. He became the most influential scholar in the imperial court, and taught in the imperial madrassa in Delhi. Sialkoti was weighed in gold twice by Shah Jahān. He was the one who introduced the Persian philosopher Mulla Sadra in the Subcontinent, and his fame reached as far as Ottoman Empire already during his lifetime.

Ahmad Sirhindi and Sialkoti were both class fellows. After the completion of their studies, they remained separated till 1022 AH/1613. Later in that year, one of Sialkoti's students remained absent for a few days from the class. Sialkoti got concerned and he sent word for him. The student came back with few pages in his hands and on Sialkoti's curiosity, he told that he read these pages and they caught his attention that he got distracted from his studies. When Sialkoti read the pages, he was also impressed. Ultimately, he figured out that these pages were written by Ahmad Sirhindi himself. Between 1023 AH/1614 and 1024 AH/1615, he went to Sirhind to meet Ahmad and accepted Sirhindi's discipleship. He was the one who gave the title of Mujadid-e-Alf-e-Sani (Reviver of the second millennium) to Ahmad Sirhindi. In return, Ahmad Sirhindi bestowed upon him the title of Aftāb-i-Panjāb (Sun among the scholars of Punjab).

== Literary works ==
Sialkoti was a prolific writer. His most important works include Ḥāshiya-yi sharḥ ḥikmat al-'ayn, Ḥāshiya-yi sharḥ al-'aqā'id of 'Allamah al-Taftāzānī, Ḥāshiya-yi sharḥ al-mawāqif of 'Allamah al-Jurjānī, Ḥāshiya-yi sharifiyyah, Ḥāshiya-yi sharḥ-i shamsiyyah, Durrat al-thamīnah and Risāla al-khāqāniyya.

== Students ==
His notable students include Chandar Bhan Brahman, Qāzi Abdur Rahīm Murādabādī, Syed Ismail Bilgrāmī, Shaykh Muhammad Afzal Jaunpurī, Ismatullah Saharanpuri and Moulavī Muhammad Qanuajī. After Abdul Hakim Sialkoti's death in 1656, his son Maulvī Abdullah (d. 1094 AH/1682) became chief scholar of Sialkot, and his madrassa became a centre of learning.

== See also ==
- List of Sufis
- List of Muslim theologians
- List of Ash'aris and Maturidis
