= Muhammad Hanif Jalandhari =

Pakistani Islamic scholar

Mawlānā Qari Muhammad Hanif Jalandhari
- مولانا محمد حنیف جالندھری
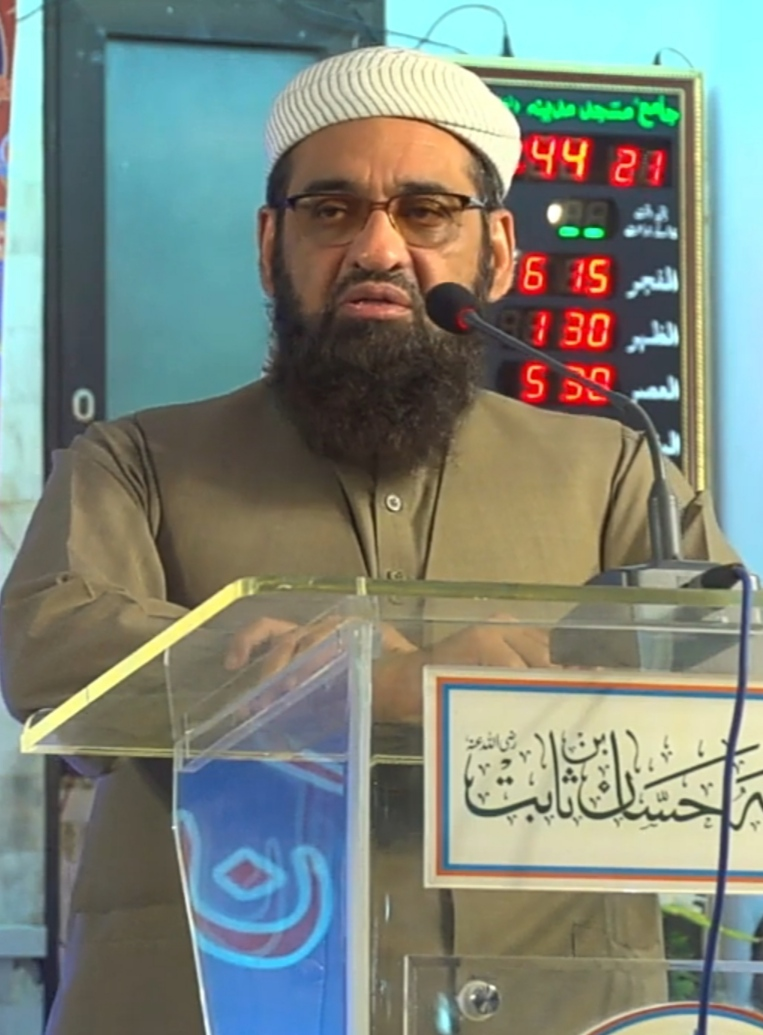
- Hanif Jalandhari in 2020

Personal life
- Born: 8 November 1963 (age 62) Multan
- Parent: Muhammad Sharif Jalandhari (father)
- Relatives: Khair Muhammad Jalandhari(grandfather)

Religious life
- Religion: Islam
- Denomination: Sunni
- Institute: Jamia Khair-ul-Madaris

6th General Sectary of Wifaq ul Madaris Al-Arabia, Pakistan
- Incumbent
- Assumed office 2 March 1998
- Preceded by: Habibullah Mukhtar

3rd rector of Jamia Khairul Madaris
- Incumbent
- Assumed office 22 October 1981
- Preceded by: Muhammad Sharif Jalandhari

7th Vice President of Wifaq ul Madaris Al-Arabia, Pakistan
- In office 8 June 1989 – 2 March 1998
- Preceded by: Maulana Muhammad Obaidullah
- Succeeded by: Hasan Jan

Chairman of Punjab Quran Board
- Incumbent
- Assumed office October 2022
- Preceded by: Sahibzada Hamid Raza

Personal details
- Awards: Sitara-e-Imtiaz (Star of Excellence) Award by the President of Pakistan (2023)

Muhammad Hanif Jalandhari (born; 8 November 1963) محمد حنیف جالندھری) is a Pakistani Islamic scholar, incumbent General Secretary of Wifaq ul Madaris Al-Arabia, Pakistan the rector of Jamia Khairul Madaris since 1981. and Chairman of Punjab Quran Board.

He has also served as Vice-president of Wifaq ul Madaris Al-Arabia, Pakistan from 8 June 1989 to 2 March 1998.

== Awards and recognition ==
- He was awarded by the International Organization for Quran Memorization (a subsidiary of Muslim World League) for producing the most Huffaz of Quran in the world in the year 2013 - 2014.
- Sitara-e-Imtiaz (Star of Excellence) Award by the President of Pakistan for his services to Pakistan in the field of religion.

== See also ==
- List of Deobandis
