= Wifaq-ul-Madaris al-Arabia =

Federation of Islamic Seminaries in Pakistan

Wifaq ul Madaris Al-Arabia, Pakistan
- وفاق المدارس العربیہ
- Other name: The Federation of Madaris
- Motto: رَبِّ زدْنيِ عِلْماً (Arabic)
- Type: Board of Islamic seminaries
- Established: 19 October 1959
- Religious affiliation: Sunni Islam (Hanafi school, Deobandi)
- President: Taqi Usmani
- Vice-president: Anwar-ul-Haq Haqqani; Ubaiullah Khalid; Sayyid Sulaiman Yousuf Banuri; Maulana Saeed Yousuf
- General Secretary: Muhammad Hanif Jalandhari
- Location: Multan, Punjab, Pakistan
- Website: www.wifaqulmadaris.org

Wifaq-ul-Madaris al-Arabia, Pakistan (Urdu: وفاق المدارس العربیہ lit. 'Federation of Madaris') is the largest federation of Islamic seminaries in Pakistan, founded in 1959. More than 10,000 seminaries and 23,000 madaris across Pakistan are affiliated with the federation. It controls all the seminaries which are run by Deobandi school of thought.

The current president Taqi Usmani was appointed on 19 September 2021 after the death of the former president, Abdur Razzaq Iskander.

Qari Muhammad Hanif Jalandhari is general secretary of the federation. The head office of the federation is situated in Multan.

== Functions ==
The functions of 'Wifaq ul Madaris Al-Arabia, Pakistan' are the registration of seminaries, creation of syllabus, checking standard of education, arrangement of examination and issuance of degrees.

== Course curriculum ==
The Dars-i-Nizami is the traditional eight-year Islamic curriculum administered by Wifaq-ul-Madaris al-Arabia for male students and a six-year curriculum for female students. It is structured into four distinct stages, each lasting two years and aligned/equivalence with Pakistan’s formal education system.

== Presidents ==
- Shamsul Haq Afghani (19 October 1959 – 12 January 1963)
- Khair Muhammad Jalandhari (12 January 1963 – 22 October 1970) – founder of Jamia Khairul Madaris Multan.
- Sayyed Yousuf Banuri (30 May 1973 – 17 October 1977) – founder of Jamia Uloom-ul-Islamia.
- Mufti Mahmud (15 May 1978 – 14 October 1980)
- Muhammad Idrees Meerthi (30 November 1980 – 1988)
- Maulana Saleemullah Khan (8 June 1989 – 15 January 2017) - founder of Jamia Farooqia Karachi.
- Abdur Razzaq Iskander (5 October 2017 – 30 June 2021) – Chancellor of Jamia Uloom-ul-Islamia.
- Mufti Taqi Usmani (20 September 2021 – present)

== See also ==
- List of Deobandi organisations
- Ittehad-e-Tanzeemat-Madaris Pakistan
- Madrassas in Pakistan
- Qawmi, Bangladesh
