= Allama Banuri Town =

Coordinates: 24°53′N 67°03′E

Allama Banuri Town is a residential and commercial area in Karachi, Pakistan. Originally known as New Town, it was renamed in honour of the hadith scholar Muhammad Yousuf Banuri. Banuri had established a Deobandi madrassa by the name of Jamia Uloom ul Islamia in Karachi.
