= Jamia Uloom-ul-Islamia =

Islamic seminary in Pakistan

Coordinates: 24.881337°N 67.041739°E

Jamia ul-Uloom-ul-Islamia
- جامعۃ العلوم الاسلامیہ بنوری ٹاؤن، کراچی; Jame'at Ul-uloom ul Islamia, Banori town, Karachi
- Type: Islamic University; Madrasa
- Established: 1954 (1374 Hijri)
- Founder: Muhammad Yousuf Banuri
- Affiliations: Wifaq ul Madaris; Darul Uloom Deoband
- Religious affiliation: Sunni Islam (Hanafi Deobandi)
- Chancellor: Sayyid Sulaiman Yousuf Banuri
- Vice-Chancellor: Ahmad Yousuf Banuri
- Students: 12,000 (Total)
- Location: Banuri Town, Karachi, Pakistan
- Campus: Urban
- Website: www.banuri.edu.pk

Jamia Uloom-ul-Islamia (Urdu: جامعہ علومِ اسلامیہ, Jāmiā Ulūm-i Islāmīyā / جامعۃ العلوم الاسلامیہ, Jāmi‘at-ul-‘Ulūm-ul-Islāmīyah) is an Islamic University in Banoori Town, Karachi, Pakistan. The university was established in 1954 by Allama Muhammad Yousuf Banuri.

The university continues the tradition of the Darul Uloom system initiated by Darul Uloom Deoband.

As of 2007, there are about twelve thousand students in different departments of the Jamiah and its branches, including a number of foreign students from over sixty countries.

== Assassinations of preachers ==
On 2 November 1997, Habibullah Mukhtar (Rector) and Abdus Sami, were martyred when two motorcyclists hurled an explosive device at their van.

On 18 May 2000, Yousuf Ludhianvi, was shot dead by gunmen in Karachi.

On 30 May 2004, Mufti Nizamuddin Shamzai, was martyred when armed men ambushed his vehicle in front of the Mosque.

On 9 October 2004, Jameel Ahmad Khan, was killed when his vehicle was fired upon by two gunmen on motorcycles.

On 13 May 2012, Aslam Sheikhupuri was killed when gunmen on two motorcycles shot at his car. He had been associated with the school for 25 years.

== Notable alumni ==
- Maulana Abdullah Ghazi, political figure and leader of Lal Masjid and Jamia Faridia
- Masood Azhar, leader of Jaish-e-Mohammed (JeM)
- Asim Umar, leader of Al-Qaeda in the Indian subcontinent (AQIS)
- Saifullah Akhtar, leader of Harkat-ul-Jihad al-Islami (HuJI)
- Azam Tariq, leader of Sipah-e-Sahaba Pakistan (SSP)
- Ahmed Ludhianvi, sarparast-e-aala of Ahle Sunnat Wal Jama'at (ASWJ).
- Fazlur Rehman Khalil, leader of Harkat-ul-Mujahideen (HuM)
- Aurangzaib Farooqi, leader of Ahle Sunnat Wal Jama'at (ASWJ)
- Abdul Aziz Ghazi, imam of Lal Masjid and Chancellor of Jamia Faridia
- Ali Sher Hyderi, leader of Sipah-e-Sahaba Pakistan (SSP)
- Abdolmalek Rigi, leader of Jundallah
- Mullah Omar, founder of the Taliban organization and Supreme Leader of Islamic Emirate of Afghanistan, did not study there, but was granted an honorary degree
- Mahmudul Hasan, chairman of Al-Haiatul Ulya Lil-Jamiatil Qawmia Bangladesh.
- Abdus Salam Chatgami, former Grand Mufti of Bangladesh
- Anwar Badakhshani, Sheikh Al-Hadith at Jamia Uloom-ul-Islamia
- Hifzur Rahman, Sheikh al-Hadith at Jamia Rahmania Arabia
- Ilyas Kashmiri, Pakistani Special Forces Operator turned Islamist jihadist militant leader

== See also ==
- Bayyinat
- Darul Uloom Haqqania
- Jamia Binoria
