= List of Jamiat Ulama-i-Hind people =

Jamiat Ulama-i-Hind is a council of Indian Sunni Muslim scholars. It was established in November 1919 by a group of scholars including Abdul Bari Firangi Mahali, Ahmad Saeed Dehlavi and Kifayatullah Dehlawi. The following is a list of people associated with it.

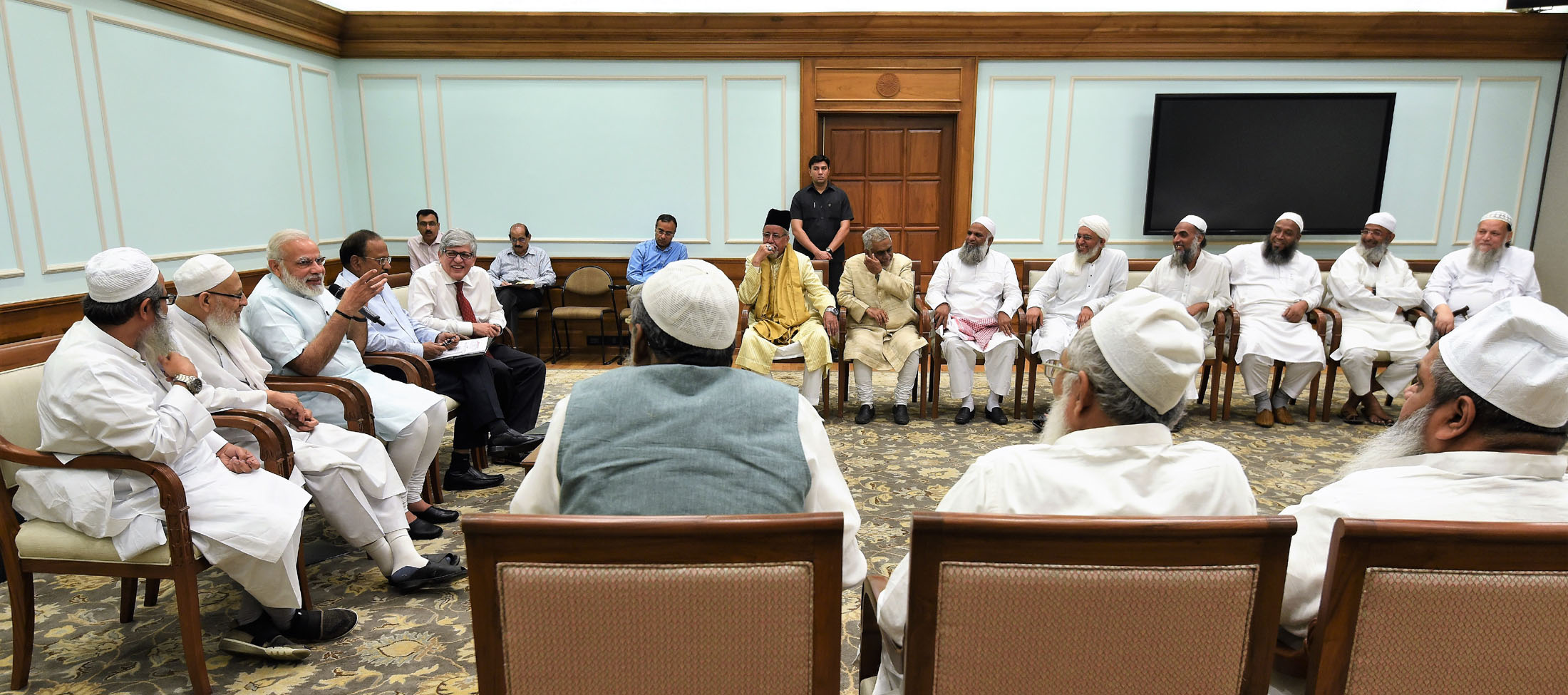
A delegation of scholars from the Mahmood Madani faction of Jamiat Ulama-e-Hind led by President Usman Mansoorpuri, meeting the Indian Prime Minister, Narendra Modi on 9 May 2017.

== List of founders ==
- Abdul Bari Firangi Mahali, was a leader of Indian freedom struggle. He was among the students of Abd al-Hayy al-Lucknawi.
- Abdul Haleem Gayawi
- Abul Muhasin Sajjad, was the founder of Muslim Independent Party. He also established the Imarat-e-Sharia in Bihar.
- Ahmad Saeed Dehlavi
- Azad Subhani
- Bakhsh Amritsari
- Dawood Ghaznavi
- Ibrahim Darbhangawi
- Kifayatullah Dehlawi
- Khuda Bakhsh Muzaffarpuri
- Khwaja Ghulam Nizamuddin
- Muhammad Ibrahim Mir Sialkoti
- Sanaullah Amritsari
- Mazharuddin
- Muhammad Abdullah
- Muhammad Akram Khan, was the founder and editor of The Azad. He also published newspapers such as Akhbār-e-Muḥammadi in Bangla and Akhbār-e-Zamāna in Urdu.
- Muhammad Anees
- Muhammad Asadullah Sindhi
- Muhammad Imam Sindhi
- Muhammad Fakhir
- Muhammad Sadiq Karachivi, was a student of Mahmud Hasan Deobandi and Khalil Ahmad Saharanpuri. He established the Jamiat Ulama in Karachi as the then state-unit of Jamiat Ulama-e-Hind.
- Muniruzzaman Khan, was a resident of Islamabad (Chittagong), and a staunch critic of the Pakistan movement. He died in Kolkata.
- Qadeer Bakhsh
- Sayyid Ismail
- Sayyid Kamaluddin
- Sayyid Muhammad Dawood
- Taj Muhammad

== List of presidents ==
No.	Name	Term of office		Reference
#	Kifayatullah Dehlawi (Interim)	November 1919	November 1920	
1	Mahmud Hasan Deobandi	November 1920	30 November 1920	
2	Kifayatullah Dehlawi	6 September 1921	7 June 1940	
3	Hussain Ahmad Madani	13 July 1940	5 December 1957	
4	Ahmad Saeed Dehlavi	December 1957	4 December 1959	
5	Syed Fakhruddin Ahmad	December 1959	5 April 1972	
6	Abdul Wahab Arvi			
7	Asad Madni	11 August 1973	6 February 2006	
8	Arshad Madani	7 February 2006	5 March 2008 (Jamiat Ulema-e-Hind bifurcated)	

== List of general secretaries ==
No.	Name	Term of office		Reference
1	Ahmad Saeed Dehlavi	November 1920	12 July 1940	
2	Abul Muhasin Sajjad	13 July 1940	23 November 1940	
3	Abdul Haleem Siddiqi	November 1940	1942	
4	Hifzur Rahman Seoharwi	1942	2 August 1962	
5	Muhammad Miyan Deobandi	1962	August 1963	
6	Asad Madni	9 August 1963	10 August 1973	
7	Syed Ahmad Hashmi	11 August 1973	28 January 1980	
8	Asrarul Haq Qasmi	29 January 1980	11 October 1991	
9	Mufti Abdul Razzaq	12 October 1991	22 January 1995	
10	Abdul Aleem Farooqui	23 January 1995	2001	
11	Mahmood Madani	2001	5 March 2008 (Jamiat Ulema-e-Hind bifurcated)	

== Jamiat Ulema-e-Hind (Arshad) ==
=== Presidents ===
No.	Name	Term of office		Reference
1	Arshad Madani	4 April 2008	"in office"	

=== General secretaries ===
No.	Name	Term of office		Reference
1	Abdul Aleem Farooqui	8 April 2008	15 October 2020	
2	Masoom Saqib Qasmi	15 October 2020	"in office"	

== Jamiat Ulema-e-Hind (Mahmood) ==
=== Presidents ===
No.	Name	Term of office		Reference
1	Usman Mansoorpuri	5 April 2008	21 May 2021	
2	Mahmood Madani	27 May 2021 (as interim); 18 September 2021 (as permanent president)	"in office"	

=== General secretaries ===
No.	Name	Term of office		Reference
1	Mahmood Madani	5 April 2008	27 May 2021	
2	Hakeemuddin Qasmi	27 May 2021	"in office"	

== Others ==
People who have been in the executive or working committee of the Jamiat Ulema-e-Hind, or have served other related positions, like, state-president for any Indian state.

- Abdul Hameed Nomani
- Abul Kalam Azad
- Abdur Rauf Danapuri
- Ahmad Ali Lahori
- Ahmed Ali Badarpuri
- Anwar Shah Kashmiri
- Asjad Madani
- Badruddin Ajmal
- Habib-ur-Rehman Ludhianvi
- Hakim Ajmal Khan
- Hasrat Mohani
- Matinul Haq Usama Qasmi
- Muhammad Ismail Katki
- Muhammad Jabir Qasmi
- Murtaza Hasan Chandpuri
- Rahmatullah Mir Qasmi
- Salman Bijnori
- Salman Mansoorpuri
- Saifuddin Kitchlew
- Shabbir Ahmad Usmani
- S.S. Sajideen Qasmi
- Sulaiman Nadwi
- Syed Ashhad Rashidi
- Tajul Islam
- Zafar Ali Khan
