= Salman Mansoorpuri =

Indian mufti and writer (born 1967)

Na'ib Amir al-Hind Maulana, Mufti Muhammad Salman Mansoorpuri
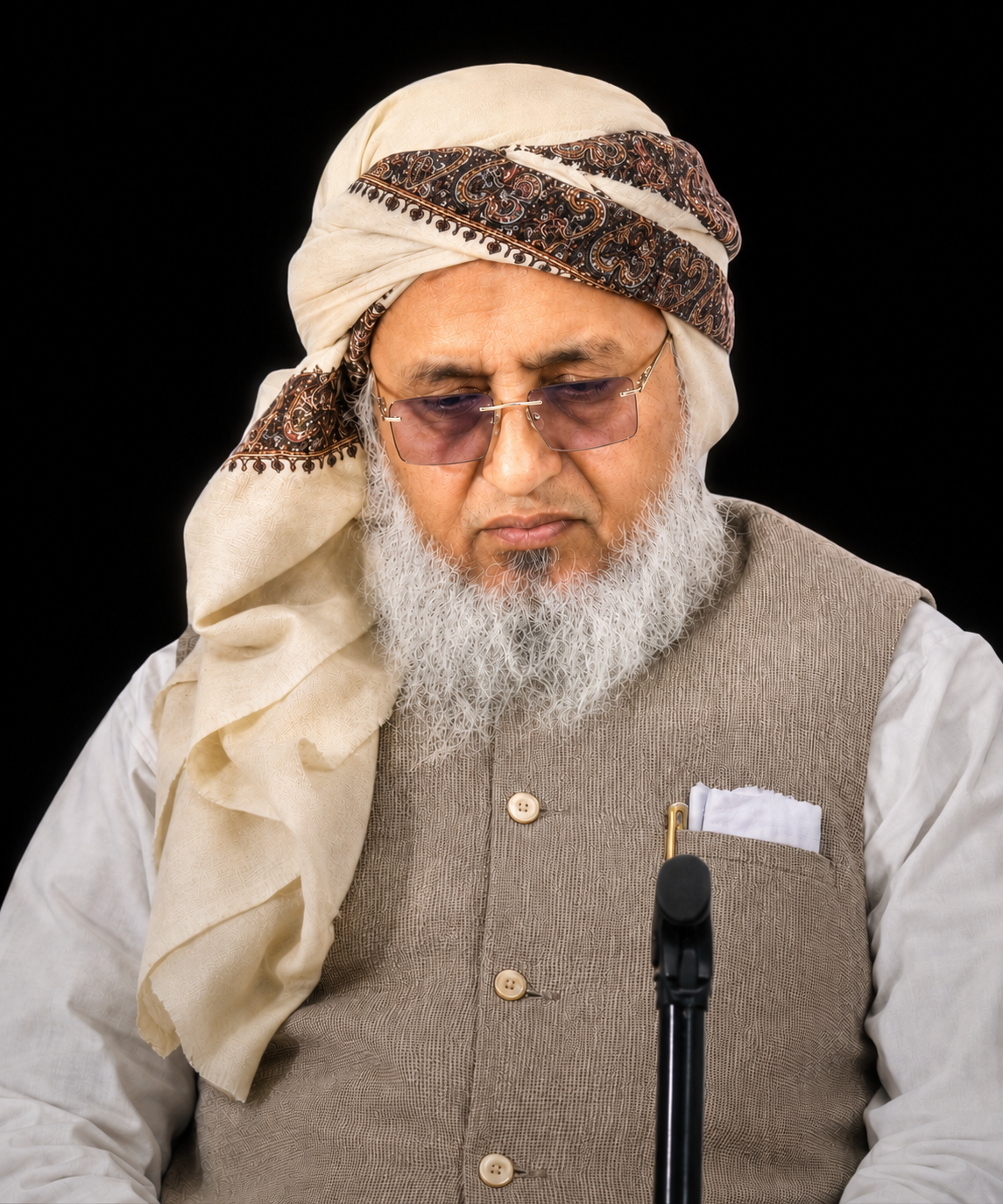

Na'ib Amir al-Hind, Imarat-e-Shariah Hind
- Incumbent
- Assumed office July 2021

Editor of the Urdu monthly Nida-e-Shahi
- Incumbent
- Assumed office 1990
- Title: Islamic Scholar, Professor, Writer

Personal life
- Born: 11 February 1967 (age 59) Deoband, Uttar Pradesh, India
- Parent: Usman Mansoorpuri (father)
- Citizenship: Indian
- Era: Contemporary
- Education: Darul Uloom Deoband
- Known for: Fiqh, Islamic ethics, Urdu writings
- Occupation: Islamic scholar, Jurist, Writer, Educator
- Relatives: Hussain Ahmad Madani (Maternal Grandfather) Asad Madani (Uncle) Arshad Madani (Uncle, Father-in-law) Affan Mansoorpuri (Brother)Asjad Madani (Uncle) Mahmood Madani (Cousin Brother) Syed Ashhad Rashidi (Cousin Brother)

Religious life
- Religion: Islam
- Denomination: Sunni
- Jurisprudence: Hanafi
- Creed: Maturidi
- Movement: Deobandi
- Profession: Professor of Tafseer, Hadith & Fiqh at Darul Uloom Deoband

Muslim leader
- Teacher: Naseer Ahmad Khan; Mahmood Hasan Gangohi; Abdul Haq Azmi; Qamaruddin Ahmad Gorakhpuri; Nematullah Azmi; Saeed Ahmad Palanpuri; Arshad Madani; Abdul Khaliq Madrasi
- Influenced by: Ashraf Ali Thanwi, Muhammad Zakariyya Kandhlawi, Taqi Usmani

Muhammad Salman Mansoorpuri (born 11 February 1967) is an Indian Islamic scholar, jurist, and writer affiliated with the Deobandi school of thought. He currently serves as a teacher at Darul Uloom Deoband and has been associated with Jamia Qasmia Madrasa Shahi, Moradabad, where he previously served as deputy mufti. He is the editor of the Urdu monthly Nida-e-Shahi and has authored several books on Islamic law, ethics, history, and social reform. In 2021, he was appointed as Na'ib Amir al-Hind (Deputy Amir of India) under the Imarat-e-Shariah Hind system.

== Early life and education ==
Muhammad Salman Mansoorpuri was born on 11 February 1967 in Deoband. His ancestral home is Mansoorpur, a locality in Muzaffarnagar district, Uttar Pradesh, India. He is the eldest son of Muhammad Usman Mansoorpuri, former deputy vice-chancellor of Darul Uloom Deoband and president of Jamiat Ulama-e-Hind (M). He is also the maternal grandson of Hussain Ahmad Madani.

He began his formal education at Jamia Qasmiya, Gaya, Bihar, where his father was posted as a teacher. In 1970 (1390 AH), he moved to Amroha and continued his studies there until 1981 (1401 AH). During this period, he completed the memorization of the Qur'an and studied foundational Arabic texts under his father's supervision, while formally enrolled at Jamia Islamia, Jama Masjid, Amroha, up to the fourth year.

In late 1982 (1402 AH), he joined the spiritual and academic environment of Darul Uloom Deoband for higher Islamic studies, entering directly into the fourth year of the Dars-e-Nizami curriculum. He graduated in 1987 (1407 AH) with distinction in Dawrah Hadith (the final year of hadith studies). He then pursued specialization in Islamic jurisprudence (Takhassus fi al-Fiqh) in 1988, followed by Ifta training in 1989 and pedagogical training (Tadrib fi al-Tadris) in 1990. He also performed Hajj in 1988 (1408 AH) during this period of study.

Mansoorpuri studied Sahih al-Bukhari with Naseer Ahmad Khan (Part I) and Abdul Haq Azmi (Part II); Jami' al-Tirmidhi with Saeed Ahmad Palanpuri (Part I) and Arshad Madani (Part II); Sharh Ma'ani al-Athar also with Palanpuri; Sahih Muslim and Muwatta Imam Muhammad with Nematullah Azmi; Muslim (Part II) with Qamaruddin Ahmad Gorakhpuri; Sunan Abi Dawud and Muwatta Imam Malik with Muhammad Husain Bihari; Sunan ibn Majah with Riyasat Ali Zafar Bijnori; Sunan an-Nasa'i with Zubair Ahmad Deobandi and Mahmood Hasan Gangohi; and Shama'il al-Muhammadiyya with Abdul Khaliq Madrasi.

== Career ==
After completing his studies, Mansoorpuri began teaching at Darul Uloom Deoband as part of his pedagogical training (Tadrib fi al-Tadris) in 1990, before joining Jamia Qasmia Madrasa Shahi in Moradabad as a full-time faculty member. There, he taught texts such as Sahih Muslim, Jami' al-Tirmidhi, Muwatta Imam Malik, Shamā'il al-Tirmidhi, and Hidayah Akhirain, among others. In the Ifta department, he also taught Sharh Uqood Rasm al-Mufti and Al-Ashbah wa al-Nazair.

In addition to teaching, he served as the deputy mufti of the institution, issuing legal verdicts and responding to public queries, as well as mentoring students training in ifta. From 1990 until his appointment at Darul Uloom Deoband, he served as the editor of the Urdu monthly journal Nida-e-Shahi, published by Madrasa Shahi. He now holds the position of honorary editor.

As of 2017, he served as the General Secretary of the Religious Educational Board of Jamiat Ulama-i-Hind (M).

In July 2021, he was appointed as Na'ib Amir al-Hind (Deputy Amir of India), a religious title within the Imarat-e-Shariah Hind.

In March 2022, he was appointed to the faculty at Darul Uloom Deoband by the institution's governing body (Majlis-e-Shura).

== Approach to jurisprudence ==
Mansoorpuri emphasizes the importance of grounding Islamic legal rulings in classical Hanafi texts like Fatawa Shami, Bada'i al-Sana'i, Fath al-Qadir of Ibn al-Humam, and Al-Bahr al-Ra'iq of Ibn Nujaim. He also refers to the Encyclopedia of Islamic Jurisprudence but advises scholars to cross-reference its content with primary legal sources.

== Views on Islamic seminaries ==
In a 2002 article published in The Milli Gazette, Mansoorpuri defended Darul Uloom Deoband against accusations linking Islamic madrasas with extremism. He argued that such claims were unfounded and politically motivated. Emphasizing the historical and national service of Deobandi madrasas, he wrote that these institutions have consistently promoted moral values, tolerance, and peaceful coexistence, and that their curriculum does not contain any teachings that incite hatred or violence. He also pointed out that these madrasas are registered under the Societies Act, regularly audited, and operate under governmental oversight.

In 2003, amid public remarks by VHP leader Praveen Togadia targeting Islamic seminaries including Darul Uloom Deoband, Mansoorpuri publicly defended the institution. He stated that Darul Uloom's 150-year history was "an open book," emphasizing that the seminary had consistently produced men of learning and character, and had never engaged in any anti-national activity. He also asserted that its curriculum did not include any content that incited hatred or intolerance towards followers of other religions.

== Views on jihad and extremism ==
Mansoorpuri has also written and spoken extensively on controversial religious concepts such as Ghazwa-e-Hind. In a widely discussed note issued through Jamia Qasmia Madrasa Shahi, he argued that militant interpretations of the term, particularly by Pakistan-based groups like Jaish-e-Mohammad, are based on weak hadith chains and are misused for political purposes. He outlined, according to his analysis, three interpretive possibilities: historical battles during early Islamic conquests (such as those led by Muhammad bin Qasim), symbolic references to other regions such as Basra, or a future eschatological event linked with the return of Isa (Jesus). Citing hadith science, he emphasized that these narrations lack reliable isnads and should not be used to promote modern-day militancy.

== Intellectual influences ==
Mansoorpuri's interest in religious reading and authorship developed early under the guidance of his parents. He was influenced by Islamic biographies and religious literature from a young age, and later developed admiration for scholars such as Ashraf Ali Thanwi, Muhammad Zakariyya Kandhlawi, Muhammad Shafi Usmani, Abul Hasan Ali Nadwi, and Taqi Usmani.

== Literary works ==
Mansoorpuri is a prolific writer whose work spans multiple genres, including fiqh, ethics, and Islamic history. His notable works include Kitab al-Masail (5 volumes), Kitab al-Nawazil (19 volumes), Allah se Sharam Kijiye (transl. Be Ashamed Before Allah), and Allah Walon ki Maqbooliyat ka Raaz (transl. The Secret Behind the Acceptance of the Pious).

He has also authored Tahreek-e-Azadi-e-Hind mein Musalman Ulama aur Awam ka Kirdar (transl. The Role of Muslim Scholars and the Public in the Indian Freedom Movement), which offers a historical perspective on the role of Indian Muslims in the freedom movement. Another significant work is Zikr-e-Raftagaan (transl. Remembrance of the Departed), a multi-volume collection of obituaries and tributes to deceased scholars, compiled from articles originally published in Nida-e-Shahi. As of 2023, six volumes of the series have been released.

He compiled Da’wat-e-Fikr-o-Amal (transl. Call to Thought and Action) and Lamhaat-e-Fikriyyah (transl. Reflective Moments), which consist of editorials and reflective essays published between 1990–2005 in Nida-e-Shahi. He is also known for preparing thematic issues of the journal, such as the Tarikh-e-Shahi Number (transl. Shahi History Issue), Hajj wa Ziyarat Number (transl. Hajj and Pilgrimage Issue), Naat al-Nabi Number (transl. Prophetic Praise Issue), and Fida-e-Millat Number (transl. Devotee of the Nation Issue).

His other works include Tohfa-e-Ramadan (transl. Gift of Ramadan), Deeni Masail aur Unka Hal (transl. Religious Issues and Their Solutions), Fatwa-Nawisi ke Rehnuma Usool (transl. Guiding Principles of Fatwa Writing), Fatawa Sheikh al-Islam (transl. Legal Opinions of Sheikh al-Islam), Pekar-e-Azm wa Himmat: Ustad aur Shagird (transl. Embodiment of Resolve and Courage: Teacher and Student), Noor-e-Nubuwwat (transl. The Light of Prophethood), Islami Muasharat (transl. Islamic Social Life), Shamail-e-Rasool (transl. Prophetic Characteristics), Hajjaj Kiram ke liye Zaroori Hidayat (transl. Essential Guidance for Pilgrims), Dars Surah Fatihah (transl. Lessons from Surah al-Fatiha), Qadyani Mughallatay (transl. Qadiani Misconceptions), Radd-e-Mirzaiyyat ke Zarreen Usool (transl. Golden Principles in Refuting Mirzaiyat) and Ulama aur Talabah ke liye fikr-angez aur karguzar baatein (transl. Thought-Provoking and Beneficial Points for Scholars and Students)

== See also ==
- Deobandi movement
