= Syed Ashhad Rashidi =

Indian Islamic scholar and religious leader

Maulana Syed Ashhad Rashidi
- مولانا سید اشہد رشیدی
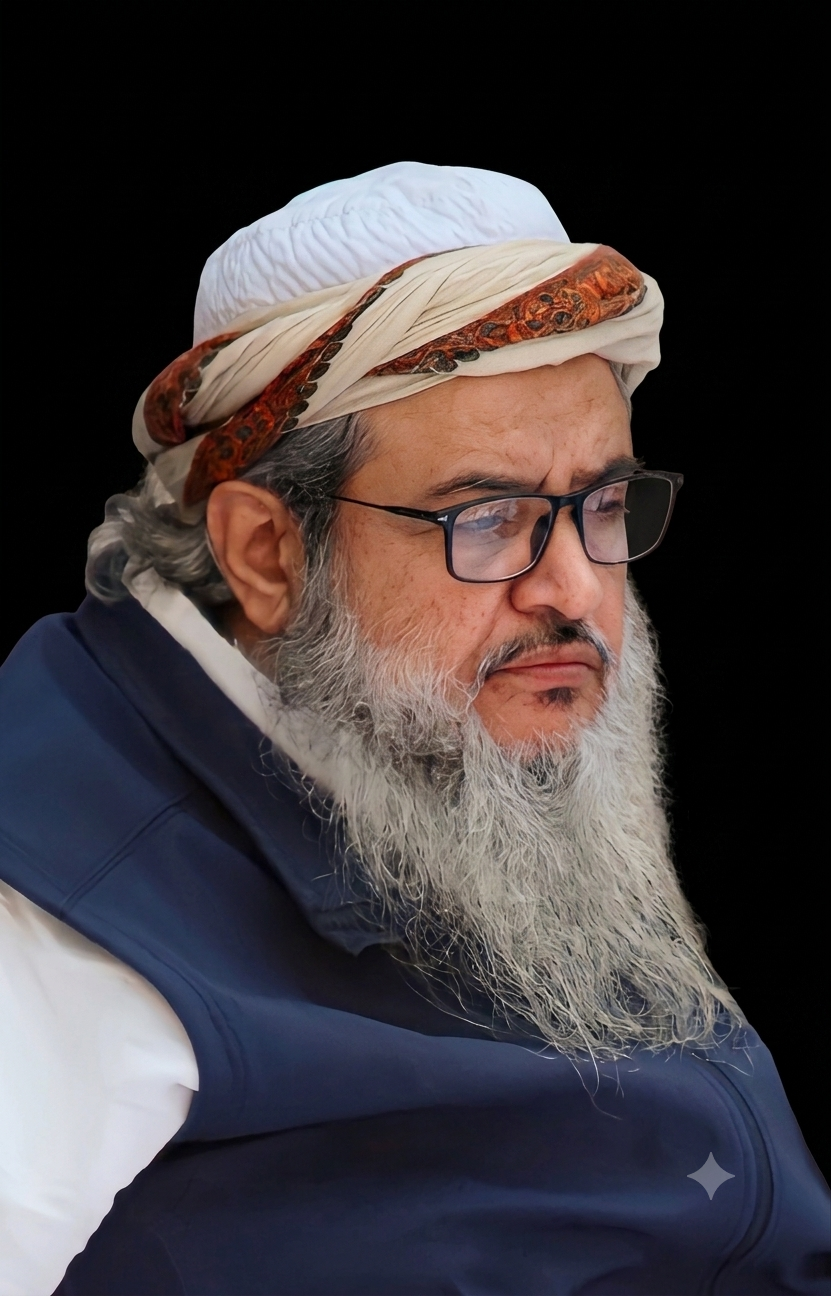

President Jamiat Ulama-e-Uttar Pradesh (A)

Rector Madrasa Shahi

Personal life
- Born: 1971 (age 54–55) Moradabad, Uttar Pradesh, India
- Children: Maulana Syed Kaab Rashidi Advocate Supreme Court of India
- Parent: Maulana Syed Rasheed-Uddin Hamidi (father)
- Era: Contemporary
- Notable work: Legal challenge in Ayodhya dispute
- Education: Darul Uloom Deoband
- Occupation: Islamic scholar, Religious Leader
- Relations: Hussain Ahmad Madani (Maternal Grandfather), Maulana Syed Hamid-ud-deen (Paternal Grandfather), As'ad Madani (Maternal Uncle) , Arshad Madani (Maternal Uncle), Usman Mansoorpuri (Uncle), Asjad Madani (Maternal Uncle), Akhlad Rashidi (Elder Brother), Mahmood Madani (Paternal & Maternal Cousin), Salman Mansoorpuri (Maternal Cousin), Affan Mansoorpuri (Maternal Cousin & Brother-in-law), Hasan Madani (Maternal Cousin).

Religious life
- Religion: Islam
- Denomination: Sunni
- Jurisprudence: Hanafi
- Creed: Maturidi
- Movement: Deobandi
- Profession: Rector & Professor Jamia Qasmia Madrasa Shahi

Syed Ashhad Rashidi (born 1971) is an Indian Islamic scholar and religious leader associated with Jamiat Ulama-e-Hind. He serves as the rector of Madrasa Shahi in Moradabad and has been elected multiple times as the president of Jamiat Ulama-e-Hind (A)'s Uttar Pradesh unit. Rashidi has been actively involved in socio-political issues and legal matters, including filing a review petition against the 2019 Supreme Court of India verdict on the Ayodhya dispute. He has also commented on various governmental policies affecting the Muslim community in India.

== Early life and education ==
Syed Ashhad Rashidi was born in 1971 (1391 AH). He received his early education at Madrasa Shahi in Moradabad, where he studied until the fourth grade. He then enrolled at Darul Uloom Deoband, where he completed his Daurah-e-Hadith in 1991 (1411 AH) and Takmil-e-Adab in 1992 (1412 AH).

== Career ==
Following his education at Darul Uloom Deoband, Rashidi was appointed as a teacher at Madrasa Shahi in Moradabad. Later, he took on the role of rector at Madrasa Shahi in Moradabad. He also became actively involved with Jamiat Ulama-e-Hind and was elected as the president of its Uttar Pradesh unit multiple times. In October 2024, he was re-elected to this position for the seventh consecutive time.

In his capacity as a religious leader, Rashidi has participated in various social and political discussions, including addressing communal incidents. In 2024, he directed Jamiat Ulama-e-Hind representatives to assess the situation following communal violence in Bahraich and Sambhal. He condemned what he described as unilateral actions against Muslims and called for judicial inquiries into alleged police misconduct.

His son, Kaab Rashidi, is an Islamic scholar, legal advisor, and spokesperson for Jamiat Ulama-e-Hind.

== Political views ==
=== Ayodhya dispute ===
Rashidi was involved in legal efforts concerning the Ayodhya dispute. In December 2019, as the president of Jamiat Ulama-i-Hind, he filed a review petition in the Supreme Court challenging its verdict on the Ram Janmabhoomi-Babri Masjid case. The petition argued that the ruling effectively condoned previous actions against the Babri Masjid and contended that the site was awarded to Hindu claimants despite acknowledged violations. The Supreme Court later dismissed all review petitions, including Rashidi's, stating that they lacked merit.

=== Social and political engagement ===
Rashidi has commented on various socio-political issues. In 2015, he criticized the ghar wapsi campaign by right-wing groups, arguing that it promoted social divisions and that the government's response was inadequate. In 2017, he announced the Rashtriya Ekta Sammelan (National Unity Conference) in Lucknow, aiming to counteract what he described as growing communal discord in the country.

In March 2016, Rashidi, as a representative of Jamiat Ulama-e-Hind, expressed concerns over what he described as efforts to transform India into a Hindu Rashtra. He criticized the central government's silence on the matter and stated that Jamiat Ulama-e-Hind would protest against any attempts to undermine India's secular fabric. Rashidi emphasized that such developments could disrupt communal harmony and called for collective efforts to safeguard the country's pluralistic identity.

=== Views on government policies ===
In 2015, Rashidi opposed a mandatory advance fee for animal sacrifice during Hajj, stating that such a requirement was unnecessary and not obligatory in all forms of Hajj. In 2018, he responded to a proposed dress code for madrasa students in Uttar Pradesh, stating that any changes should be carefully examined before implementation.

== See more ==
- List of Jamiat Ulema-e-Hind people
