= Syed Mahmood Mian =

Pakistani Islamic scholar (1956–2025)

Mawlana Syed Mahmood Mian

Emir of Jamiat Ulema-e-Islam (F) Punjab
- In office September 2024 – 2 July 2025

Personal details
- Known for: Leadership in JUI-F Punjab and Islamic education
- Title: Sheikh al-Hadith

Personal life
- Born: July 1956 Pakistan
- Died: 2 July 2025 (aged 68–69) Lahore, Pakistan
- Resting place: Jamia Madania Jadeed, Raiwind Road, Lahore
- Parent: Syed Hamid Mian (father)
- Known for: Principal of Jamia Madania Jadeed
- Occupation: Islamic scholar, educator

Religious life
- Religion: Islam
- Denomination: Sunni
- Order: Jamiat Ulema-e-Islam (F)
- Movement: Deobandi

Syed Mahmood Mian (July 1956 – 2 July 2025) was a Pakistani Islamic scholar and political figure affiliated with Jamiat Ulema-e-Islam (F). He served as the Emir (provincial head) of JUI-F in Punjab and was also the principal of Jamia Madania Jadeed, a religious seminary located on Raiwind Road in Lahore.

== Early life and education ==
Syed Mahmood Mian was born in July 1956 in Pakistan. He belonged to a family of prominent religious scholars. His father, Syed Hamid Mian (1926–1988), served as the central Emir of Jamiat Ulema-e-Islam (JUI), and his grandfather, Syed Muhammad Mian, was associated with Jamiat Ulama-e-Hind as a central General Secretary. Syed Muhammad Mian also taught at the historic Madrasa Shahi in Moradabad, India, where he was a teacher of Mufti Mehmood, a prominent Deobandi scholar and politician.

== Career ==
Mahmood Mian served as the principal of Jamia Madania Jadeed, where he was involved in teaching Islamic sciences including Hadith and Fiqh. He also held the position of Sheikh al-Hadith at the same institution, contributing to advanced instruction in Hadith literature. Under his leadership, the institution became a center for Islamic education in the region.

He was a senior leader in Jamiat Ulema-e-Islam (F), often participating in religious and political activities related to the party. In September 2024, he was elected as the provincial emir (president) of JUI-F Punjab for a five-year term, a position he held until his death in July 2025. He was known for his role in guiding the party on ideological and religious matters.

== Death ==
Mahmood Mian died on the night of 2 July 2025 following a prolonged illness. His funeral prayer was held the next morning, 3 July, at 10:00 AM at Jamia Madania Jadeed on Raiwind Road in Lahore. The funeral was attended by religious scholars, political figures, students, and members of the public.

Religious figures and organizations expressed sorrow at Mahmood Mian's death, describing it as a loss to the religious and educational community in Pakistan. JUI-F leader Fazal-ur-Rehman offered condolences, referring to Mian's lifelong dedication to the teaching of prophetic sciences.

== See also ==
- Jamiat Ulema-e-Islam (F)
- Mufti Mahmood
