= Abu Salman Shahjahanpuri =

Pakistani historian (1940–2021)

Abu Salmān Shahjahānpūri
- Born: Tasadduq Hussain Khan; 30 January 1940; Shahjahanpur, United Provinces, British India
- Died: 2 February 2021 (aged 81); Karachi, Pakistan

Academic background
- Education: Jamia Qasmia Madrasa Shahi, University of Karachi, University of Sindh
- Thesis: Tazkirah Khānwāda-e-Waliullāhi
- Doctoral advisor: Sakhi Ahmad Hashmi

Abu Salmān Shahjahānpūri (30 January 1940 – 2 February 2021; Urdu: ابو سلمان شاہجہانپوری) was a Pakistani scholar, researcher and historian. He was regarded as an authority in the historical and political movements of the Indian subcontinent. He was an alumnus of Jamia Qasmia Madrasa Shahi, University of Karachi and the University of Sindh. He wrote more than 150 books including Ifādat-e-Azād and Maulānā ʻUbaidullāh Sindhī ke inqilābī manṣūbe.

== Life and career ==
Abu Salmān Shahjahānpūri was born Tasadduq Hussain Khan on 30 January 1940 in Shahjahanpur. He was schooled at Madrasa Saeedia in Shahjahanpur and the Jamia Qasmia Madrasa Shahi in Moradabad. Aged 10, he migrated to Pakistan in 1950. He received a BA and an MA degree from the University of Karachi and completed his doctoral studies at the University of Sindh. The subject of his doctoral study was to compile and study Khānwada-e-Waliullāhi of Syed Ahmad Khan.

Shahjahānpūri served as a Professor at Government National College, Karachi and retired in 2002. He was regarded as an authority on historical and political movements of the Indian subcontinent. He was associated with Abul Kalam Azad Research Institute in Karachi and visited India during 2014 to present his papers in an International seminar about Abul Kalam Azad organized by Iran Society and Maulana Abul Kalam Azad Institute of Asian Studies in Kolkata. His articles appeared in the Ma'ārif of Shibli Academy, the Burhān of Nadwatul Musannifeen, Madina and the Chattan. In 2010, he had more than one hundred books to his credit. He stopped writing in 2016 due to his weakness and old age.

Shahjahānpūri's house was set on fire during the Qasba Aligarh massacre in 1986. According to a 2019 Express News report, hundreds of works were lost in this incident including rare manuscripts that he possessed.

== Abul Kalamism ==
Shahjahānpūri was regarded as a major "Abul Kalāmi" in Pakistan after Agha Shorish Kashmiri and Ghulam Rasool Mehr. He started writing in 1957, and his first article appeared after the death of Abul Kalam Azad. He codified various articles of Azad and got them published. He wrote explanatory notes to the Urdu translation of Azad's India Wins Freedom. His works on Azad include Maulana Abul Kalam Azad: Ek Siyasi Mutala, Maulana Abul Kalam Azad: Ranchi mai nazarbandi awr uska faizān, Maulana Abul Kalam Azad awr Khwajah Hasan Nizami, Maulana Abul Kalam Azad ke chand buzurg and Abul Kalam Azad awr un ke ma'āsirīn.

== Literary works ==
Shahjahānpūri wrote more than 150 books. Fifty of his books are only about Abul Kalam Azad. His major research work is the compilation of the political diary of Hussain Ahmad Madani, Hussain Ahmad Madani ki siyāsi diary: akhbār-o-afkār ki roshni mai, which spreads over seven thousand pages, in eight different volumes. Shahjahānpūri has the credit of getting Ilm-o-Aagahi, the college magazine of Government National College, Karachi, published as a research magazine. His other works include:

- Imām al-Hind, taʻmīr-i afkār
- Dīvān-i Āh: Abū al-Naṣr G̲h̲ulām Yāsīn Āh Dihlavī ke Urdū aur Fārsī kalām kā majmūʻah maʻ z̤amīmah kalām-i Ārzū va Ābrū
- Taḥrīk-i Pākistān: afkār o masāʼil
- Maulānā Muḥammad ʻAlī aur unkī ṣaḥāfat (Muhammad Ali Jauhar and his journalism)
- Ashfāqullāh K̲h̲ān̲ Shahīd : ḥayāt o afkār : kākorī kes kā hīro
- Maulānā ʻUbaidullāh Sindhī ke inqilābī manṣūbe (Revolutionary mission of Ubaidullah Sindhi)
- Maulānā Muḥammad ʻAlī : savāniḥ va k̲h̲idmāt

== Death and legacy ==
Shahjahānpūri died on 2 February 2021 in Karachi. Indian scholars Usman Mansoorpuri and Mahmood Madani expressed sorrow on his death.

Akhtarul Wasey and Khaliq Anjum co-authored Maulānā Abūlkalām Āzād ke muḥaqqiq Ḍākṭar Abū Salmān Shāhjahānpūrī: shak̲h̲ṣīyat aur adabī k̲h̲idmāt (The research scholar of Abul Kalam Azad, Abu Salmān Shahjahānpūri: Life and academic works). According to Moinuddin Aqeel, "Shahjahānpūri is the scholar who is a keen observer of the rise and fall of the nationalist and historic movements of Indian subcontinent".
