= Masood Madani =

Indian politician

Masood Asad Madani (born 1 April 1967) is an Indian politician and Deobandi leader who had served as a Minister of State-ranked official in the Narayan Datt Tiwari Ministry in Government of Uttarakhand from 2002 to 2007. He is the younger brother of former Rajya Sabha Member, Mahmood Madani and son of Asad Madani. He was a Member of the Indian National Congress.

In 2021, Maulana had requested Government of India to recognise Taliban, as it is now changed.

== Personal life ==
In 2017, a woman filed a first information report against Maulana that he had raped her in the name of Black Magic. The woman wrote in the Tahrir that she went to Piran Kaliyar where she was taken to Maulana, she had no child. Maulana called her in privacy and raped her. He was convicted of rape and was jailed on 18 March 2017. He was acquitted by the High Court on 6 June 2017, saying that he was covered under Honey Trap.

Umar Madani, the son of Maulana contested the 2022 Uttar Pradesh Legislative Assembly election from Deoband Assembly constituency representing the All India Majlis-e-Ittehadul Muslimeen, led by Asaduddin Owaisi. He lost and managed to get only 3500 votes.
