= Masoom Saqib Qasmi =

Indian Islamic scholar

Mufti Masoom Saqib Qasmi

General Secretary of Jamiat Ulama-i-Hind (A)
- Incumbent
- Assumed office 15 October 2020
- Preceded by: Abdul Aleem Farooqui

Personal life
- Born: Syed Masoom Saqib Masoodpur Bhiyaon Sharif, Ambedkar Nagar district, Uttar Pradesh, India
- Education: Madrasa Karamatia, Jalalpur; Darul Uloom Deoband
- Occupation: Islamic scholar, author

Religious life
- Religion: Islam

Masoom Saqib Qasmi is an Indian Islamic scholar and author. He has served as the general secretary of the Jamiat Ulama-i-Hind (A) since 15 October 2020 and as a member of the Majlis-e-Shura of Mazahir Uloom Jadeed since December 2017.

== Early life and education ==
Masoom Saqib Qasmi hails from Masoodpur Bhiyaon Sharif, in present-day Ambedkar Nagar district, Uttar Pradesh. His father was Syed Muhammad Akbar.

He received his education and training at Madrasa Karamatia, Jalalpur, under the guidance of Zameer Ahmad Azmi. He completed the final two years of the Dars-i-Nizami curriculum at Darul Uloom Deoband and subsequently received training in Ifta there.

== Career ==
After completing his education at Darul Uloom Deoband, Qasmi joined Darul Uloom Imdadia in Rayachoty, Kadapa district, Andhra Pradesh, on the advice of Syed Asad Madani. He served as an Arabic teacher there and was later appointed as its administrator.

He had been associated with the Jamiat Ulama-i-Hind and its senior leaders since his student days. He later served as vice-president of the Andhra Pradesh unit of the Jamiat Ulama-i-Hind (A) and subsequently as its president. He has served as the general secretary of the Jamiat Ulama-i-Hind (A) since 15 October 2020. He has also been a member of the Majlis-e-Shura of Mazahir Uloom Jadeed since December 2017.

As general secretary, he has represented the Jamiat Ulama-i-Hind at its working committee meetings and national conferences. He has also been involved in the Jamiat Ulama-i-Hind's work concerning the functioning of Sharia courts in India.

He has also supervised the Help Ex-Muslim website, which provides material addressing questions and misconceptions about Islam and Islamic beliefs and practices.

== Literary works ==
He has also written on child psychology and education. His book Ta'leem-e-Nafsiyat (Urdu: تعلیم نفسیات), published by Maktaba Naumaniya, Deoband, discusses child psychology and the education and upbringing of children in educational institutions.

His another work is Tahffuz-e-Khatm-e-Nabuwwat.
