= Asjad Madani =

Indian Islamic scholar (b. c. 1956)

Maulana Asjad Madani

Vice President of Jamiat Ulama-e-Hind (Arshad faction)
- Incumbent
- Assumed office 2023
- President: Arshad Madani

Head of JUH Legal Aid Committee
- Incumbent
- Assumed office 10 September 2023
- Preceded by: Gulzar Azmi

Personal life
- Born: c. 1956 (age 69–70 (Note: While several sources mention that Asjad Madani was born in 1957, including some that specify 15 December 1957, a memorial article published on 15 February 1958 in Daily Al-Jamiat described him as being "about one and a half years old" at that time. This suggests a possible birth date in mid-1956. Another account states that his father, Hussain Ahmad Madani, was 80 years old at the time of his birth. According to the Islamic calendar, Hussain Ahmad Madani was born on 19 Shawwal 1296 AH and died on 13 Jumada al-Awwal 1377 AH, living approximately 81 lunar years.)) Deoband, Uttar Pradesh, India
- Spouse: Daughter of Samiur Rahman (Samastipur)
- Children: 1 son (Hasan Madani), 2 daughters
- Parent: Hussain Ahmad Madani (father)
- Education: Darul Uloom Deoband
- Occupation: Islamic scholar, administrator
- Relatives: Asad Madani (elder brother); Arshad Madani (brother); Mahmood Madani (nephew)

Religious life
- Religion: Islam
- Denomination: Sunni Islam
- Jurisprudence: Hanafi
- Creed: Maturidi
- Movement: Deobandi

Asjad Madani (born c. 1956) is an Indian Islamic scholar and administrator who serves as the senior vice-president and head of the Legal Aid Committee of the Jamiat Ulama-e-Hind. A graduate of Darul Uloom Deoband, he has been actively involved in religious education, social reform, and legal advocacy. He is the youngest son of the freedom fighter and Islamic scholar Hussain Ahmad Madani.

== Early life and education ==
Asjad Madani was born c. 1956 in Deoband, India. He is the son of Hussain Ahmed Madani and his fourth wife, known as Aapa Jan. His elder brothers include Asad Madani and Arshad Madani. His nephew is Mahmood Madani.

He memorized the Qur'an under scholars such as Qari Asghar Ali and Qari Muhammad Kamil. He studied at Madrasa Shahi, Moradabad, and later enrolled at Darul Uloom Deoband, where he studied under notable scholars including Abdul Haq Damani (a disciple of Hussain Ahmad Madani), Mirajul Haq Deobandi, Wahiduzzaman Kairanawi, Naseer Ahmad Khan, Saeed Ahmad Palanpuri, Nematullah Azami, and his elder brother, Arshad Madani. He graduated in 1986.

== Career ==
Madani began his organizational involvement in 1987 as secretary of the Jamiat Ulama-e-Hind (JUH), and in 2006, he became a member of its working committee. In 2023, he was appointed vice-president of the JUH (A) during a general body meeting held in Mumbai. Later that year, following the death of Gulzar Azmi, Madani was appointed head of the JUH Legal Aid Committee, which has been active since 2007. The committee focuses on defending Muslims who have been falsely accused in terrorism-related cases. According to JUH sources, the committee has contributed to the acquittal of over 300 individuals, including some who had initially received death sentences. In 2019, Madani was appointed as a member of a five-member committee formed by Jamiat Ulama-e-Hind (A) to consider filing a review petition against the Supreme Court's verdict in the Ayodhya case. The committee was tasked with evaluating legal options and was scheduled to report within four days.

In addition to his organizational roles, Madani manages a number of educational and religious institutions across India. These include the Madani Educational Trust in Deoband, Madrasa Madania in Bihar, Ma'had Tahfiz al-Qur'an in Hazaribagh (Jharkhand), the Modern Madani Public School in Madhubani (Bihar), and Jamia Islamia Lilbanat Inter College in Deoband. In 2021, he participated in a JUH (A) working committee meeting that publicly opposed co-education and called for the establishment of separate educational institutions for girls. In February 2022, he attended another JUH working committee meeting chaired by Arshad Madani, in which the organization declared that hijab is mandatory in Islam and criticized restrictions on it as a violation of Article 25 of the Indian Constitution.

In October 2024, Madani addressed a gathering in Shamli, Uttar Pradesh, where he emphasized the need to protect waqf properties and madrasas from what he described as anti-Islamic efforts to dismantle them. He urged Muslims to respond legally and constitutionally, and appealed for mass participation in a JUH-led “Defend the Constitution” convention in Delhi.

In November 2024, during a visit to Prayagraj district, he publicly criticized the Uttar Pradesh government for its handling of a communal incident in Sambhal, urging it to uphold constitutional values and act impartially.

Madani is also actively involved in humanitarian and relief efforts. His work includes providing housing for widows, ensuring access to clean water, supporting people with disabilities, and offering free medical care. He has also focused on technical education for girls, particularly in underprivileged regions such as Bihar, Jharkhand, Odisha, and West Bengal.

In February 2019, Madani formally inaugurated the newly renamed "Madani Chattar" (Madani Square) in Sylhet, Bangladesh. Named by the Sylhet City Corporation in honor of his father, Hussain Ahmad Madani, the square commemorates his historic association with the region. During the event, Asjad Madani also addressed the public at the nearby Naya Sarak Mosque.

He has authored and contributed to several pamphlets and publications released by the JUH, covering topics such as legal aid and rehabilitation, the Babri Masjid case, and interfaith harmony in India. These works have been circulated through JUH’s media division and have also appeared in national newspapers.

== See also ==
- Arshad Madani
- Syed Ashhad Rashidi
