= Arshad Madani =

Indian Islamic scholar (b. 1941)

Amirul Hind, Maulana Arshad Madani
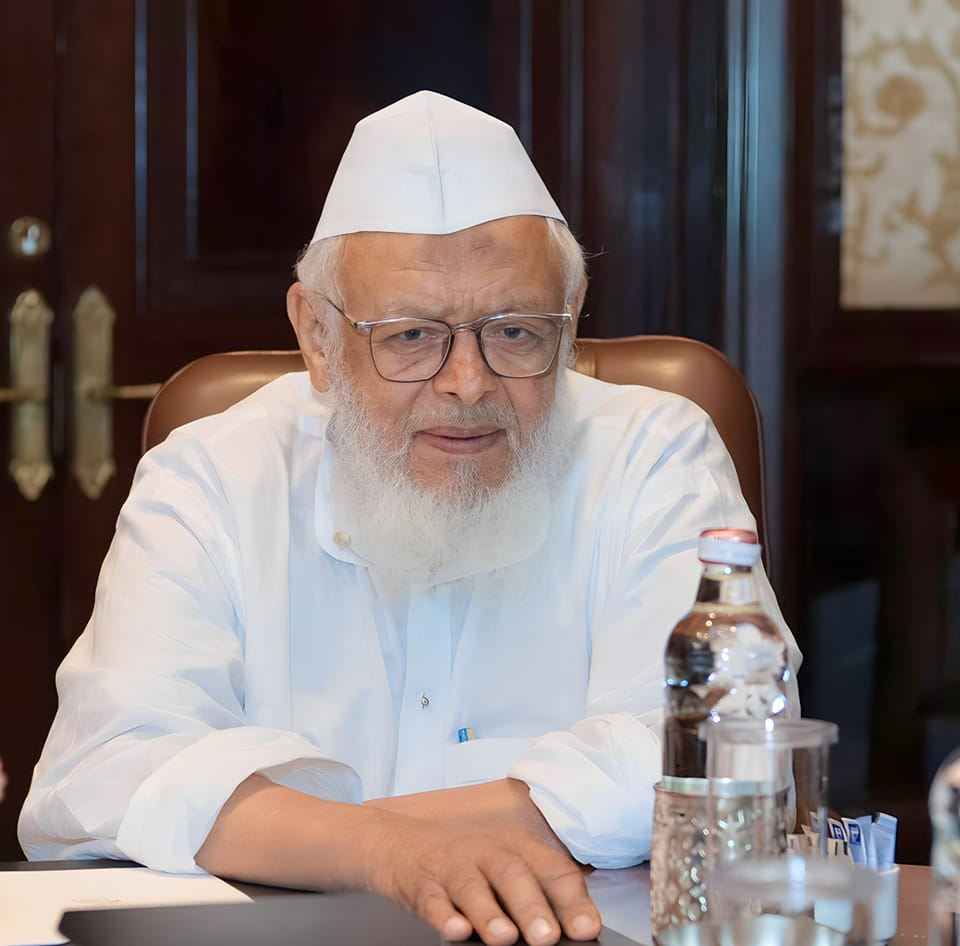

1st President of Jamiat Ulama-e-Hind (A)
- Incumbent
- Assumed office 4 April 2008
- Preceded by: office established

12th Principal of Darul Uloom Deoband
- Incumbent
- Assumed office 14 October 2020
- Preceded by: Saeed Ahmad Palanpuri

8th President of Jamiat Ulama-e-Hind
- In office 8 February 2006 – 6 March 2008
- Preceded by: Asad Madani
- Succeeded by: "office bifurcated": Arshad Madani, as the president of Arshad faction; Usman Mansoorpuri, as the president of Mahmood faction

Personal life
- Born: 1941 (age 84–85) Deoband, United Provinces, British India
- Parent: Hussain Ahmad Madani (father)
- Education: Darul Uloom Deoband
- Occupation: Islamic scholar
- Relatives: Asad Madani (elder brother); Asjad Madani (younger brother); Usman Mansoorpuri (brother-in-law); Mahmood Madani (nephew); Salman Mansoorpuri (son-in-law, nephew); Syed Ashhad Rashidi (nephew)

Religious life
- Religion: Islam
- Denomination: Sunni

Arshad Madani (born 1941) is an Indian Islamic scholar and the current Principal of Darul Uloom Deoband. He succeeded Asad Madni as the eighth president of the Jamiat Ulama-e-Hind. The organization split around 2008, and Madani continues to serve as the president of its Arshad faction.

== Early life and education ==
Arshad Madani was born in 1941 (1360 AH) to the fourth wife of Hussain Ahmad Madani, whom he married after the demise of his third wife and the mother of Asad Madani.

Madani began his education under Hussain Ahmad Madani's authorised disciple, Asghar Ali Sahaspuri, with whom he completed the memorization of the Qur'an at the age of 8, after which he completed a 5-year course in Persian at Darul Uloom Deoband. Then he started his Arabic education in Darul Uloom Deoband in 1955 and completed the Darse Nizami in Darul Uloom Deoband in 1963 (1383 AH).

His Hadith teachers include Sayed Fakhruddin Ahmad, Ibrahim Balyawi, Fakhrul Hasan Moradabadi, Naseer Ahmad Khan, Zahoor Ahmad Deobandi, Mahdi Hasan Shahjahanpuri, Muhammad Tayyab Qasmi, and Abdul Ahad Deobandi. His other teachers in Deoband include Izaz Ali Amrohi, Jalil Ahmad Kairanawi, Akhtar Hussain Deobandi, and Wahiduzzaman Kairanawi. He is the authorized disciple of his elder brother Asad Madani.

== Career ==
After graduating from Darul Uloom Deoband, Madani started his teaching career in Jamia Qasmia, Gaya, in 1965 and did teaching services there for about one and a half years. At the beginning of 1967, he went on a pilgrimage to Madinah and stayed there for about fourteen months.

On his return from Madina, on the advice of his teacher, Syed Fakhruddin Ahmad, in Shawwal 1389 AH (1969 AD), he became a teacher at Madrasa Shahi, Moradabad, and stayed there for 14 years until 1403 AH (1983 AD). Apart from the secondary books, the teaching of hadith books like Mishkat al-Masabih, Sahih Muslim, and Muwatta Imam Malik were also assigned to him to teach. On 21 Dhu al-Qadah 1391 AH, he was also made the convener of the Academic Council along with teaching. On 11 Jumada al-Ula, 1393 AH, he was appointed the Deputy Chief of the Academic Council, and due to his efforts, the advisory committee in Madrasa Shahi approved the classification of Dars e Nizami in 1396 AH, and the educational standard of the madrassa increased. Similarly, on 14 Sha'ban 1396 AH, he was elected as a member of Madrasa Shahi's Appointment Committee.

Madani was appointed teacher at Darul Uloom Deoband in Dhu al-Qadah 1403 AH (1983 AD). He served as the Deputy Chief of Darul Uloom's Academic Council between 1987 and 1990 AD, and then as the Head of the Academic Council from 1996 to 2008.

In Safar 1442 AH (October 2020 AD), he succeeded Saeed Ahmad Palanpuri as the Principal (Head of the Teaching Faculty) at Darul Uloom Deoband by Darul Uloom's Advisory Committee.

Since 2012, he is a member of the World Muslim League.

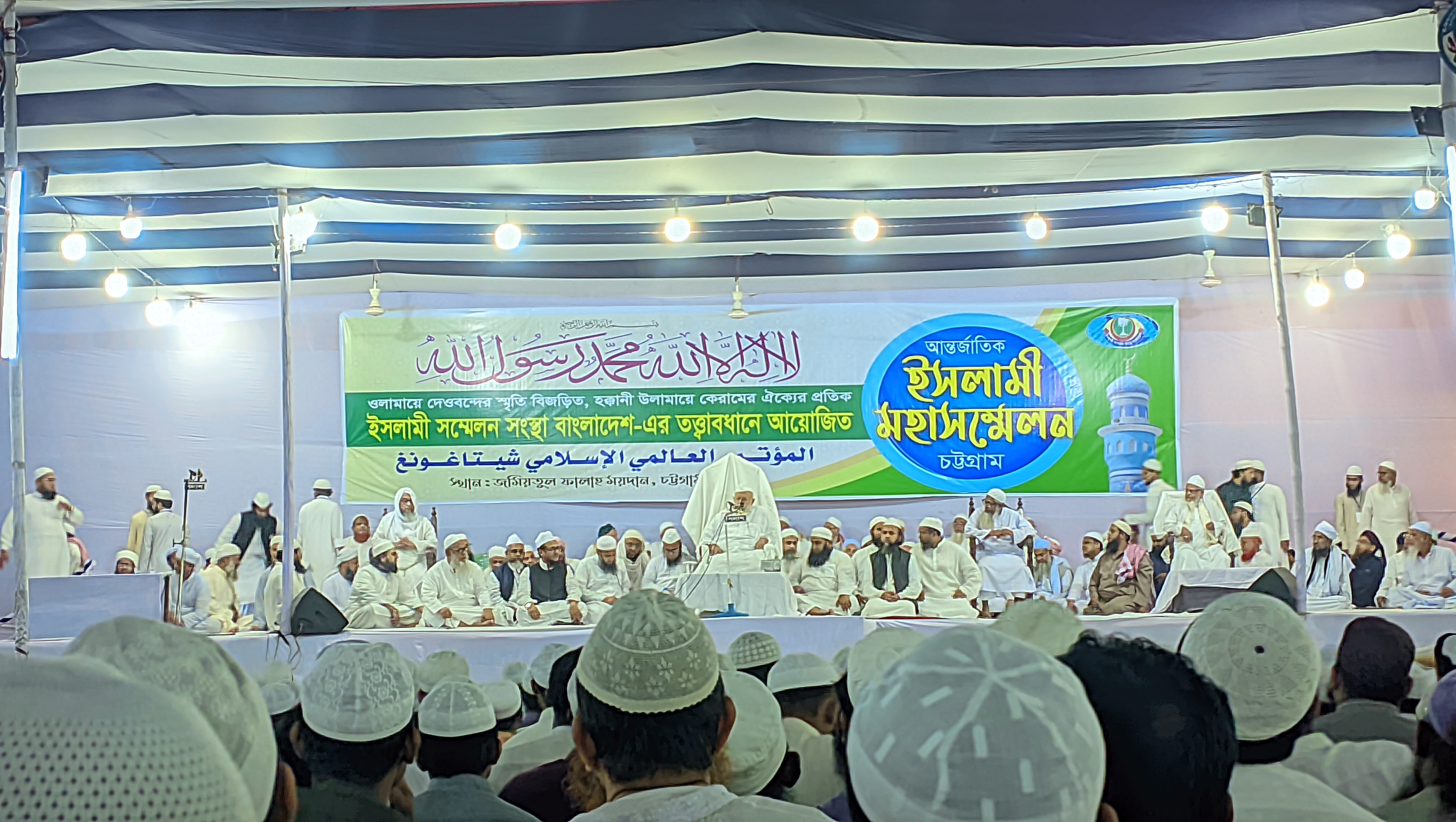
Arshad Madani Addresses the 2024 International Islamic Conference at the Jamiatul Falah Ground

=== Jamiat Ulama-e-Hind ===
On February 8, 2006, Arshad Madani succeeded his brother Asad Madani following his death. In March 2008, Jamiat Ulema-e-Hind split into two factions. Arshad was dismissed as president in 2006, after which he formed his own faction, claiming it as the legitimate Jamiat. The other faction was presided by Usman Mansoorpuri.

In mid-2022, reports indicated that the two factions of Jamiat were moving towards reconciliation and a potential merger. Mahmood Madani's faction showed willingness to work under Arshad Madani as Jamiat president. In a significant step towards unity, Arshad Madani attended Mahmood Madani's faction's general body meeting in Deoband on 28 May 2022, where he emphasized the need for the Jamiat to unite in order to amplify their collective voice.

== Political views ==
=== Opposition to partition and support for secularism ===
Madani has criticized the partition of India and espoused Hindu–Muslim unity, stating: "Our elders from Hindu and Muslim communities went ahead on the path of unity and liberated the country from the slavery of the British, but unfortunately partition also took place. This partition has become a cause of destruction and ruin, not just for a particular community, but for both Hindus and Muslims." He suggests that secularism is the only path to a cohesive and united India.

=== Views on Narendra Modi and 2002 Gujarat riots ===
In a February 2013 interview with India Today, Madani said that Narendra Modi was not credible or trustworthy to the common Muslims of India. Muslim hostility to Modi is not softening recently at all as some circles in the Indian news media have suggested. He questions whether Indian Muslims can forgive Modi for his assertion that he initiated and condoned the 2002 Gujarat riots and the ensuing violence against Muslims in India, which Madani calls a mass murder of Muslims. Narendra Modi was the Chief Minister of Gujarat at that time.

=== Remarks on interfaith parallels (Om and Allah) ===
On February 12, 2023, at Ramlila Ground in New Delhi, during a speech, Arshad Madani stated, "What Hindus worship as Om, Muslims worship as Allah." He drew parallels between religious concepts, saying that Adam in Islamic tradition is known as Manu in Hinduism, and that both Om and Allah refer to the same divine entity. He explained that different languages and cultures have different names for the same God. The statement sparked controversy, with some religious leaders expressing opposition to his comparison.

=== Statements on Palestine and Hamas ===
On November 5, 2023, Madani praised Hamas for their courage, calling them freedom fighters rather than terrorists. He argued that the Palestinian struggle, including Hamas's actions, is a legitimate fight against Israeli aggression and criticized the international community for applying double standards to Palestinian resistance.

=== Babri Masjid stance ===
In December 2023, Madani said that he had long maintained that the Babri Masjid was not built on the remains of any temple, and asserted that this position had been vindicated in the court proceedings. He stated that the court did not hold that a temple had been demolished to construct the mosque, and that the property was awarded to the Hindu side on the basis of religious belief rather than findings of demolition.

=== Gyanvapi and Mathura comments ===
In February 2024, Madani claimed that the idols currently being worshipped at the Gyanvapi mosque complex were brought from outside and were not discovered during the Archaeological Survey of India's survey. He questioned the legitimacy of the ASI's findings, arguing that if a temple had existed there before, idols would have already been present. Madani maintained that neither the Gyanvapi mosque nor the Mathura site had ever been temples, asserting that such claims conflict with Islamic beliefs.

=== Allegations concerning 'attacks on Islam' and Waqf Bill opposition ===
In August 2024, Madani alleged that unprecedented challenges were emerging in India, marked by repeated attacks on Islam. He criticized the BJP for trying and failing to divide Hindus and Muslims during the general elections. Madani also recalled that during Partition, the Congress party had assured Muslim organizations that the Constitution would uphold secularism and protect minorities. He expressed concern that this promise was now under direct threat, highlighting that the issue went beyond waqf matters to the broader constitutional guarantee of secularism and minority rights.

=== Appeals to political parties on Waqf Amendment Bill ===
Madani appealed to political parties like the TDP and JD(U) to consider the sentiments and welfare of Muslims regarding the proposed Waqf Amendment Bill. He expressed concern that this bill might make it easier to encroach on Waqf properties, including mosques and educational institutions, which are essential for the social and educational needs of the Muslim community. Madani stated that disregarding the sentiments of Muslims could potentially lead to a negative reaction.

=== Stance on 'bulldozer justice' ===
Madani, while commenting on the Supreme Court's decision against bulldozer justice, stated that the court has confirmed everything the Jamiat had been saying. He said demolishing someone’s house with a bulldozer is not a punishment but a crime, and only the judiciary has the authority to determine legality, not the government. He also reiterated that punishment should not be meted out to the family members of someone who commits a crime.

=== Opposition to Waqf (Amendment) Bill and related actions ===
In March 2025, Madani expressed opposition to the Waqf (Amendment) Bill, arguing that it would impact Muslim rights and the autonomy of Waqf properties, which he described as ancestral endowments for community welfare. He stated that government involvement in these properties was unjustified and that if the bill were passed, Jamiat Ulama-e-Hind would challenge it in state high courts and, if necessary, in the Supreme Court. Supporting ongoing protests, he emphasized that peaceful demonstrations were a constitutional right and encouraged participation to raise concerns over the bill.

=== PIL against film release (Udaipur Files) ===
In July 2025, Madani filed a public interest litigation (PIL) in the Delhi High Court seeking a stay on the release of the film Udaipur Files: Kanhaiya Lal Tailor Murder, citing concerns that its content could promote communal disharmony and negatively portray a religious community. The petition also objected to references made in the film to ongoing sensitive legal matters, stating they could pose a threat to public order and social harmony. It further argued that the film violated constitutional rights under Articles 14, 15, and 21, and challenged its certification by the Central Board of Film Certification (CBFC). On July 10, 2025, the Delhi High Court granted an interim stay on the film's release and directed the petitioners to approach the Centre under Section 6 of the Cinematograph Act, 1952 to seek cancellation of the CBFC certificate. The court stated that the Government of India should decide the matter within a week, and that the stay would remain in effect in the meantime.

=== Views on the Taliban ===
Madani has denied any institutional link between Darul Uloom Deoband and the Taliban, stating that "99% of the Taliban have never even visited India" and that the seminary has no contact with the group. He has also observed that the Taliban sometimes invoke Deobandi history and ideas, while distancing the Indian Deobandi tradition from the version of Deobandi-influenced Islam that developed in Pakistan and Afghanistan. Madani has said he would be willing to travel to Afghanistan to urge the Taliban to act peacefully and justly if the Indian government requested it.

=== 2025 statements and reactions ===
In November 2025, numerous Indian media outlets reported that Madani expressed concern about what he described as increasing discrimination against Muslims, citing recent investigative actions involving Al-Falah University and the legal troubles of politician Azam Khan as examples of government pressure on the community.

According to these reports, he contrasted the situation in India with the election of Muslim mayors abroad, mentioning Zohran Mamdani in New York and Sadiq Khan in London, and argued that Muslims in India faced obstacles in achieving senior academic positions, stating that even those who rise to such roles risk imprisonment.

He also referred to the arrest of Al-Falah University founder Jawad Ahmed Siddiqui and the investigation linking several of its doctors to the Delhi blast case, describing the scrutiny of the institution as disproportionate.

His comments prompted wide political reactions. Several Congress leaders, including Udit Raj and Sandeep Dikshit, endorsed aspects of his remarks, arguing that marginalised groups face barriers in institutional appointments and that entire communities should not be targeted during investigations.

Leaders from the BJP and allied parties, including Mohsin Raza, Shehzad Poonawalla, Yaser Jilani, Praveen Khandelwal and JD(U) spokesperson Neeraj Kumar, strongly rejected Madani’s claims. They argued that Muslims have historically held and continue to hold prominent offices in India, contending that his statements gave a communal interpretation to ongoing law-enforcement and financial-crime investigations involving Al-Falah University.

== See more ==
- List of Deobandis
