= Usman Mansoorpuri =

Indian Muslim scholar (1944–2021)

Mawlāna, Qāri Muḥammad Usman Mansoorpuri
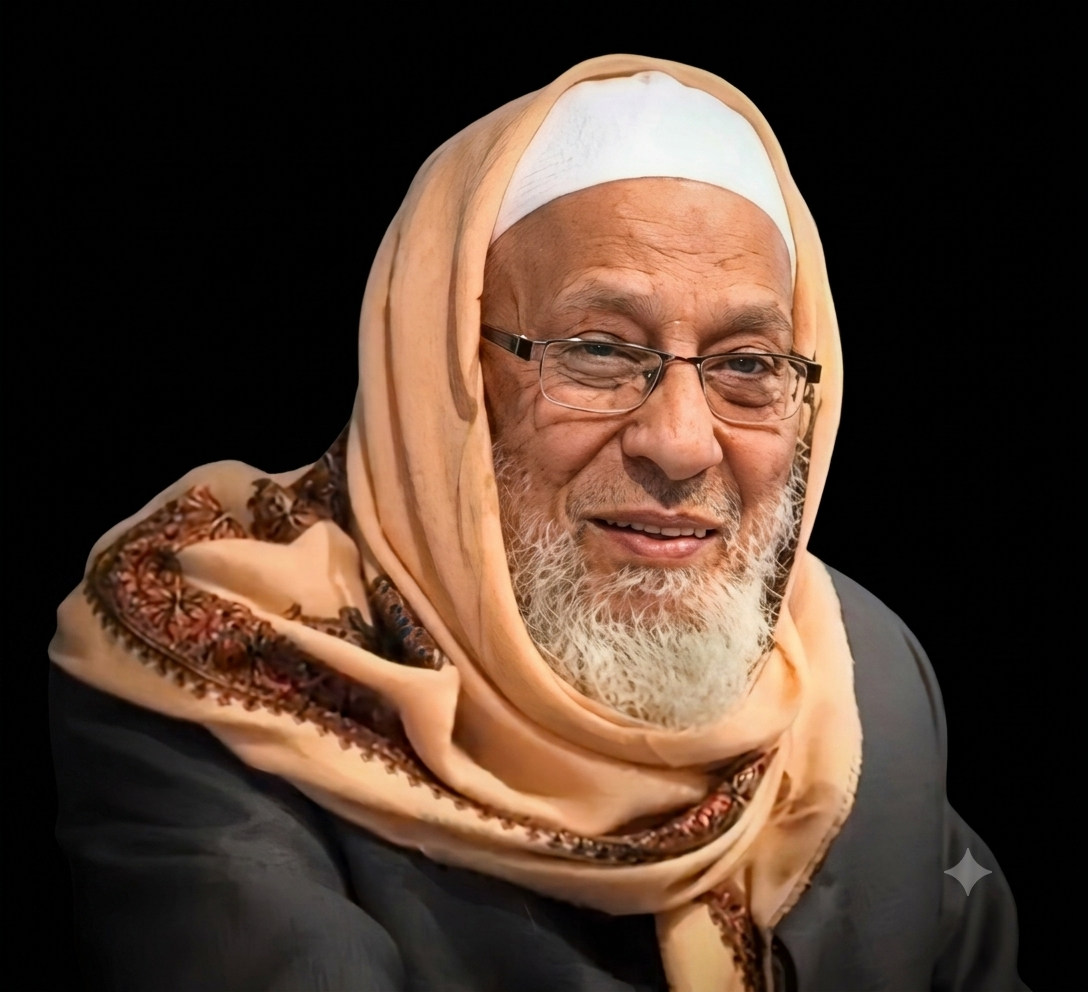
- Mansoorpuri in December 2018

1st President of Jamiat Ulama-e-Hind's Mahmood Faction
- In office 5 April 2008 – 21 May 2021
- Preceded by: "office established"
- Succeeded by: Mahmood Madani

Vice-Rector of Darul Uloom Deoband
- In office 1997–2008
- Preceded by: Habibur Rahman Khairabadi
- Succeeded by: Abdul Khaliq Sambhali

Personal life
- Born: 12 August 1944 Mansurpur, Muzaffarnagar, British India
- Died: 21 May 2021 (aged 76)
- Children: Muhammad Salman Mansoorpuri, Affan Mansoorpuri
- Region: India
- Education: Darul Uloom Deoband
- Relatives: Hussain Ahmad Madani (father-in-law), Asad Madani (brother-in-law), Arshad Madani (brother-in-law) Asjad Madani (Brother-in-law) Mahmood Madani (Nephew) Syed Ashhad Rashidi (Nephew)

Religious life
- Religion: Islam
- Denomination: Sunni
- Jurisprudence: Hanafi
- Movement: Deobandi

Muḥammad Usmān Mansoorpuri (12 August 1944 – 21 May 2021) was an Indian Muslim scholar who served as the first National President of Jamiat Ulama-e-Hind's Mahmood faction. He taught hadith at the Darul Uloom Deoband and served the seminary as a working rector.

== Biography ==
Usmān Mansoorpuri was born on 12 August 1944 in Mansurpur, Muzaffarnagar. He graduated from the Darul Uloom Deoband in the traditional dars-e-nizami in 1965. He specialized in Qirat, Tajweed and Arabic literature in 1966 from the Deoband seminary.

Usmān taught at the Madrasa Qāsmia in Gaya, Bihar for five years, and at the Madarsa Islamiya Arabia, Amroha for eleven years. In 1982, he was appointed a teacher at the Darul Uloom Deoband. He taught hadīth including the books Muwatta Imam Malik and Mishkat al-Masabih. On 5 April 2008, he was appointed the National President of Jamiat Ulama-e-Hind's Mahmood faction. He served as the vice-rector of Darul Uloom Deoband for eleven years from 1997 to 2008. In October 2020, he was appointed the working rector of the seminary. His books include Radd-i Qādyāniyat.

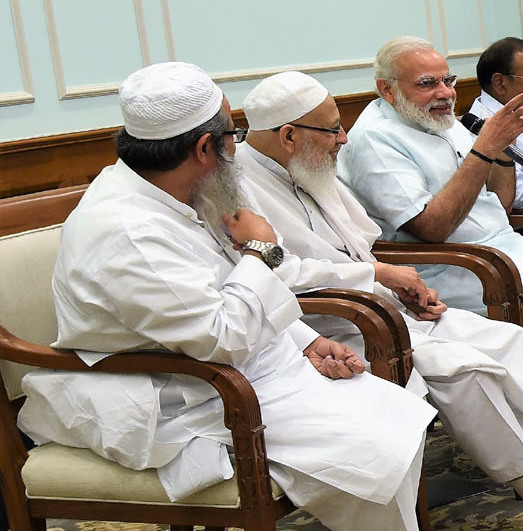
Mansoorpuri (middle) with Indian Prime Minister Narendra Modi and Mahmood Madani.

In November 2016, protesting against the visit of Israeli Prime Minister Reuven Rivlin to India, Usmān addressed a gathering in New Delhi, saying that "It has been against our culture and tradition to welcome an oppressor". He also expressed that "The Indian Government should revisit its relationship with the tyrant and expansionist Israel following into the footsteps of Mahatma Gandhi, Jawaharlal Nehru and Atal Bihari Vajpayee, and should not violate the traditional friendship of India with the weaker and oppressed people around the world." The Jamiat Ulama-e-Hind (JUH) defended the Assam Accord under his leadership in the Supreme Court of India during May 2017. In November 2019, a JUH meeting presided by him, described the Ayodhya verdict as "the darkest spot in the history of free India". He also supported the National Register of Citizens as he believed that "who is Indian and who is not should be known". JUH, under his leadership has also held Kashmir as an integral part of India. In December 2017, Usmān led an anti-Israel protest in Varanasi; demanding that the occupation of Jerusalem and killings of innocents be ended.

Usmān Mansoorpuri died on 21 May 2021 of COVID-19. Farooq Abdullah condoled his death saying that Usmān was a promoter of national unity and communal harmony and his death is a loss to both India and the Muslim community. Abdullah remarked that, "Usmān shall be remembered for his scholarly disposition, and ease of elucidation in familiarizing his students with teachings of the Quran and Sunnah". Omar Abdullah, Ali Mohammad Sagar, Nasir Aslam Wani and Syed Sadatullah Husaini, Ali al-Sallabi, Nurul Islam Jihadi also condoled his death.

== Family life ==
Usmān was the son-in-law of Hussain Ahmad Madani. His sons Salmān Mansoorpuri and Affān Mansoorpuri are Islamic scholars and jurists.
