= Ahmad Hasan Amrohi =

Indian Muslim scholar (1850-1912)

Mawlānā Ahmad Hasan Amrohi

Muhaddith Amrohi

1st Principal of Madrasa Shahi
- In office 1879–1885
- Preceded by: "post established"
- Succeeded by: "unknown"

1st Principal of Jamia Islamia Arabia Amroha
- Preceded by: "post established"
- Succeeded by: Abdur Rahman Siddīqi Sandelwi

Personal life
- Born: 1850 Amroha, Moradabad, North-Western Provinces
- Died: 18 March 1912 (aged 61–62) Amroha, Moradabad, United Provinces of Agra and Oudh, British India
- Education: Darul Uloom Deoband

Religious life
- Religion: Islam
- Denomination: Sunni
- Jurisprudence: Hanafi
- Creed: Maturidi
- Movement: Deobandi

Muslim leader
- Disciple of: Imdadullah Muhajir Makki

Ahmad Hasan Amrohi (1850 – 18 March 1912) also known as Muhaddith Amrohi within the Deobandi movement; was an Indian Muslim scholar and freedom struggle activist who served as the first principal of Madrasa Shahi in Moradabad. He was an alumnus of Darul Uloom Deoband and among the founding members of Mahmud Hasan Deobandi's Thamratut-Tarbiyat. He was an authorized disciple of Imdadullah Muhajir Makki.

== Biography ==
Ahmad Hasan was born in 1850 in Amroha, which at that time was part of the Moradabad district. He received his primary education from Sayyid Rafat Ali, Karim Bakhsh Bakhshi, Muhammad Hussain Jafri, and studied medicine with Amjad Ali Khan. He went to Meerut for higher education, where he studied with Muhammad Qasim Nanautawi. Nanautawi taught him all the academic sciences and then sent him to Darul Uloom Deoband, from where he graduated in 1290 AH, alongside Mahmud Hasan Deobandi and Fakhrul Hasan Gangohi. Ahmad was an authorized disciple of Imdadullah Muhajir Makki in Sufism and was authorized to transmit hadith by Ahmad Ali Saharanpuri and Shah Abdul Ghani.

After completing his studies, Hasan became the principal of Madrasa Qasmia, an Islamic school established by his teacher Nanautawi in Khurja. He then served in the Islamic institutions in Delhi and Sambhal as a principal, the institutions being likely Madrasa Abdur-Rab, Delhi; and Madrasa Jama Masjid, Sambhal. He became the principal of Madrasa Shahi in Moradabad upon its inception it 1879 (1296 AH), a post he served until 1885 (Dhu al-Qadah 1303 AH). Later, he moved to Amroha, where he re-established an old madrasah in the Jama Masjid, (Note: This is now known as Madrasa Islamia Amroha or Jamia Islamia Arabia Amroha, and is among the prominent Islamic institutions in India. It was earlier established by Muhammad Qasim Nanautawi.) and occupied himself with the teaching responsibilities, and served as the first rector, principal and senior hadith professor. Few years later, the executive council of Darul Uloom Deoband, called him to teach at the seminary. He taught there for just two months and then moved back to Amroha. His students included Ismail Sambhali.

Hasan was a member of the executive council of the Darul Uloom Deoband from 1895 to 1912. He was a founder members of Mahmud Hasan Deobandi's Thamratut-Tarbiyyat. He debated with Arya Samaj people and was among the prominent Muslim scholars who debated Ahmadis. On 15 June 1909, he debated with Ahmadis in Rampur alongside Sanaullah Amritsari, and defeated them. His literary works include Ifādāt-e-Aḥmadiyyah, Izālatul Waswās and Al-Ma'lūmāt al-Ilāhiyyah. He was a jurist and his religious edicts are found in the libraries of Phalauda and Rampur.

Hasan died of plague on 18 March 1912 in Amroha, Moradabad. His funeral prayers were led by Hafiz Muhammad Ahmad. Kifayatullah Dehlawi, Habibur Rahman Usmani and Mahmud Hasan Deobandi expressed grief over his death.

== See also ==
- List of Deobandis
