= Matinul Haq Usama Qasmi =

Indian Islamic scholar

Maulana, Mufti Matinul Haq Usama
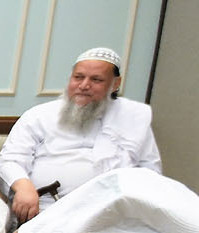

Kanpur City Qazi
- In office 28 January 2016 – 18 July 2020
- Preceded by: Mufti Manzoor Mazahiri

State President of Jamiat Ulema-e-Hind
- In office 4 October 2016 – 18 July 2020

Personal details
- Born: 7 May 1967 Fatehpur
- Died: 18 July 2020 (aged 53) Hallet Hospital, Kanpur
- Resting place: Jama Masjid Ashrafabad, Jajmau
- Education: Madarsa Jame Ul Uloom, Darul Uloom Deoband

Religious life
- Religion: Islam
- Denomination: Sunni Hanafi
- Movement: Deobandi

Matinul Haq Usama (7 May 1967 – 18 July 2020) was an Indian Muslim scholar and jurist who served as the Qazi of Kanpur city and state president of Jamiat Ulema-e-Hind for Uttar Pradesh.

== Biography ==
He was born in Fatehpur on 7 May 1967. Usama was an alumnus of Darul Uloom Deoband. He died on 18 July 2020 due to COVID-19.
