= Gulzar Azmi =

Indian Muslim social activist (1934–2023)

- Born: 1 May 1934; Bombay
- Died: 20 August 2023 (aged 88–89); Mumbai
- Citizenship: Indian
- Occupations: Social activist, legal advisor
- Years active: 1954–2023
- Organization: Jamiat Ulama-e-Hind

Gulzar Azmi (1 May 1934 – 20 August 2023) was an Indian Muslim social activist who led the Legal Cell Institute of the Jamiat Ulema-e-Hind.

== Early life ==
Gulzar Azmi was born on 1 May 1934 in Bombay. His father's name was Noor Mohammad. Native place was Kharewan, Azamgarh UP. He spent his life mostly at Mumbai. He was the fifth among his six brothers and sisters. At age of just 5, his mother's shadow lifted from his head. His early education was in JR Municipal School, Imam bada, Mumbai, where he receive school education up to the fifth standard, then he entered the Department of Theology and Arabic at Madrasa Darul Uloom Islamia, Muhammad Ali Road, Mumbai. After the education he started working as a lathe machine turner with his big brother. In early ages he participated in socialist movements and socio-religious groups. Since 1950s, he started working for Jamiat Ulema-e-Hind. He became a senior leader in the party. Upon the split of Jamiat, Gulzar stood with Arshad Madani faction in 2008.

In early 2015, he was awarded the Sipah Salaar-e-Millat Award by Bazm-e-Sham'-e-Adab, Mumbai, for his meritorious services.

== Legal cell ==
From 2006, a legal cell was started by Jamiat, to provide legal support to falsely Implicated Terror-Accused. Gulzar Azmi was heading the team of legal cell. He oversaw cases of more than 500 people who were mostly framed in terror cases. At the time of his death on 20 August 2023, he and his team were handling cases of people which included 75 people who were sentenced to death and 125 to lifetime in prison.

Gulzar, he spent his time to build legal team in every state of India. Shahid Azmi, was one of his first associate lawyers, who was representing accused of 2006 Mumbai train bombings, 2006 Malegaon bombings, Ghatkopar blasts case, 2008 Mumbai terror attack case at time of his death by shooting by gangsters. The Legal cell tried to get justice for suspects in framed terror cases, from trial court up to Supreme court.

Gulzar on behalf of Legal cell, started scholarship programs to study law from the community. Every year the organization sponsors 25 to 30 law students to empower their team.

== Death ==
On Sunday, 13 August 2023, when Gulzar Sahab was going to make an ablution for Maghrib prayer, his foot slipped, and he fell on his head. At that time, he did not feel the injury and did not even remember that he had fallen. Later he went to sleep after having dinner. The next morning when Gulzar Sahab did not regain consciousness, he was admitted to Massena Hospital, Mumbai, where the initial treatment revealed that his brain had shifted from its place and blood had clotted in the brain. Doctors immediately started brain surgery and the treatment was successful, but he did not regain consciousness. On 20 August 2023, at 10:27 in the morning, his heart stopped beating and he died. His cremation prayers were offered at Piru Lane, Pathan Wadi and his body was buried at Marine Line Graveyard. He died at the age of 89.
