= Madrasa Shahi =

Islamic seminary in Moradabad, Uttar Pradesh, India

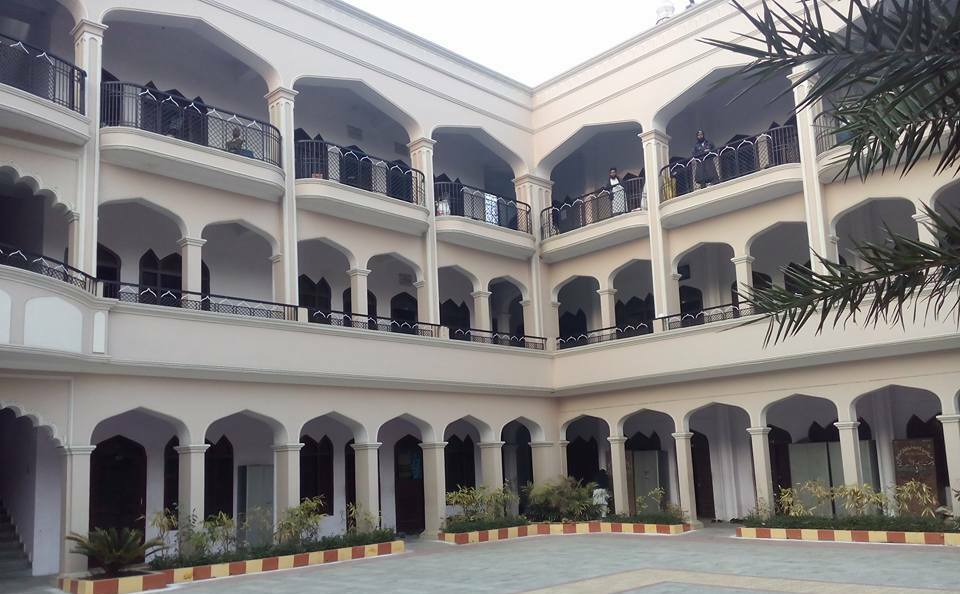
- Type: Islamic university
- Established: 1879 (147 years ago)
- Founder: Muhammad Qasim Nanautavi
- Rector: Syed Ashhad Rashidi
- Location: Lal Bagh Chowraha, Faiz Ganj, Moradabad, Uttar Pradesh, India
- Website: madarsashahi.com

Madrassa Shahi (alternatively known as Jamia Qasmia) is an Islamic seminary in Moradabad, Uttar Pradesh. It was established in 1879 by the poor Muslims of Moradabad under the supervision of Islamic scholar, Muhammad Qasim Nanautawi, who also established the Darul Uloom Deoband. This started as Madrasatul Ghuraba, but gained recognition as Madrasa Shahi. Its first principal was Ahmad Hasan Amrohi.

== History ==
Madrasa Shahi was established by the poor Muslims of Moradabad at the suggestion of Muhammad Qasim Nanautawi in 1879. It was thus known as "Madrasatul Ghuraba" (The School of the Poor) and Ahmad Hasan Amrohi was appointed its first principal. He served there for seven years, and scholars such as Abdur Rahman Siddiqi Amrohi, Abdul Ghani Phalaudi, Muhammad Yahya Shahjahanpuri and Khadim Hussain Amrohi graduated in those years. Madrasa Shahi was established on the lines of Darul Uloom Deoband. It did not accept any aid from the government.

Madrasa Shahi was initially patronized by Rashid Ahmad Gangohi. Later, its patrons included Mahmud Hasan Deobandi, Hussain Ahmad Madani, Syed Fakhruddin Ahmad, Syed Muhammad Miyan Deobandi, Zakariyya Kandhlawi and As'ad Madani. As of 2021, Arshad Madani is the patron of the institution.

Bab-e-Qasim, Jamia Qasmia Madrasa Shahi

== Courses offered ==
The seminary offers courses in dars-e-nizami (the aalim course), calligraphy, Islamic jurisprudence (Mufti), Quranic memorisation, Qirat, and specialisation courses in Arabic language and literature.

== Publications ==
Madrasa Shahi publishes its monthly Urdu journal, Nidā-e-Shāhi, since 1990. Tārīkh-e-Shāhi Number, Hajj-o-Ziyārat Number and Naat-un-Nabi Number are its few historical documentary issues.

== Alumni ==
Name	Introduction	Ref
Abu Salman Shahjahanpuri	Pakistani historian and researcher	
Athar Ali Bengali (1891–1976)	He was a Bangladeshi religious scholar and political activist who was involved in the independence movement of Pakistan. He was the founding president of the Nizam-e-Islam party.	
Hafiz Muhammad Ahmad	Rector of Darul Uloom Deoband.	
Hifzur Rahman Seoharwi	Indian freedom struggle activist	
Kifayatullah Dehlawi	First president of the Jamiat Ulama-e-Hind.	
Muhammad Ismail Katki (1914–2005)	He was associated with the Khatme Nabuwat movement in India, particularly in the state of Odisha.	
Mufti Mahmud	Pakistani politician and former Chief Minister of Khyber Pakhtunkhwa.	
Nizamuddin Asir Adrawi	Indian historian and author	
Qazi Athar Mubarakpuri	Indian historian and author	
Saeed Ahmad Akbarabadi	Former Dean of Faculty of Theology, Aligarh Muslim University	

== Bibliography ==
- Amini, Nur Alam Khalil (February 2017). "Hadhrat Mawlānā Sayyid Muḥammad Miyān Deobandi thumma al-Dehlawi". Pas-e-Marg-e-Zindah (in Urdu) (5 ed.). Deoband: Idara Ilm-o-Adab. pp. 37–107.
- Qasmi, Nayab Hasan (2013). Darul Uloom Deoband Ka Sahafati ManzarNama (in Urdu). Deoband: Idara Tehqeeq-e-Islami.
