= Jamiatul Falah Mosque =

Mosque in Chittagong, Bangladesh

- জমিয়াতুল ফালাহ
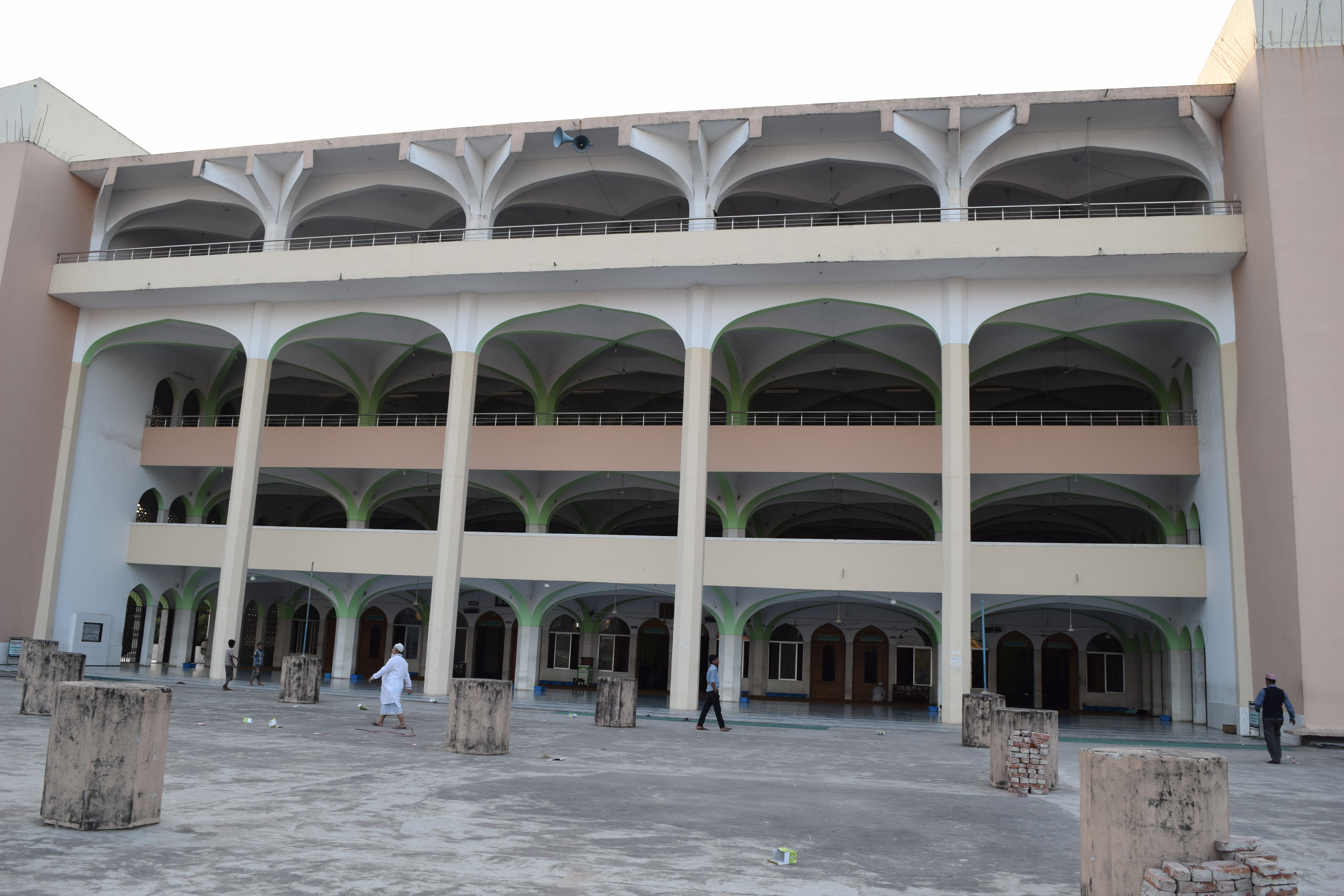

- Location of the mosque in Bangladesh

Religion
- Affiliation: Islam
- Ecclesiastical or organizational status: Mosque
- Status: Active

Location
- Location: Chittagong
- Country: Bangladesh
- Interactive map of Jamiatul Falah Mosque
- Coordinates: 22°21′00″N 91°49′23″E

Architecture
- Type: Mosque architecture
- Capacity: 5,000 worshipers

The Jamiatul Falah Mosque or Baitul Falah (Bengali: জমিয়াতুল ফালাহ) is the largest mosque in Chittagong, Bangladesh, with capacity for 5,000 worshipers.

== Overview ==
The mosque is located on the south side of WASA Square. To the east of the mosque is a large eidgah that is commonly the location of two of the three largest Eid al-Fitr and Eid al-Adha gatherings in the city.

The mosque is maintained by the Chittagong City Corporation. As of 2021, the khatib of the mosque is Syed Mohammad Abu Taleb Alauddin Al-Kaderi.

== See also ==
- Islam in Bangladesh
- List of mosques in Bangladesh
