= Muhammad Miyan Deobandi =

Indian independence activist (1903–1975)

Mu’arrikh-e-Millat, Sayyid-ul-Millat, Mawlāna Muhammad Miyan Deobandi

5th General Secretary of Jamiat Ulama-e-Hind
- In office 1962 – August 1963
- Preceded by: Hifzur Rahman Seoharwi
- Succeeded by: Asad Madni

Personal life
- Born: Muzaffar Miyan; 4 October 1903 Deoband, British India
- Died: 24 October 1975 (aged 72) Delhi, India
- Region: India
- Main interest(s): History, Urdu literature, Hadith, Politics
- Notable work(s): Idarat al-Mabahith al-Fiqhiya, Jamiat Ulema-e-Hind Kya Hai?, Ulama-e-Hind Ka Shaandar Maazi, Ulama-e-Haqq Aur Unke Mujahidana Karname, Aseeraan-e-Malta
- Education: Darul Uloom Deoband
- Relatives: Syed Mahmood Mian (grandson)

Religious life
- Religion: Islam
- Denomination: Sunni
- Jurisprudence: Hanafi
- Movement: Deobandi

Senior posting
- Disciple of: Hussain Ahmad Madani
- Influenced: Mufti Mahmud, Nizamuddin Asir Adrawi

Muhammad Miyan Deobandi (4 October 1903 – 24 October 1975) was an Indian Sunni Islamic scholar, academic, historian, freedom struggle activist, who served as the fifth general secretary of the Jamiat Ulama-e-Hind. He wrote books such as Aseeraan-e-Malta, Ulama-e-Hind Ka Shaandar Maazi and Ulama-e-Haqq Aur Unke Mujahidana Karname.

== Biography ==
Muhammad Miyan Deobandi was born Muzaffar Miyan on 4 October 1903 in Deoband. He began his studies at home and read the Qur'an from his maternal grandmother. He studied some books of Persian and Urdu with Khalīl Aḥmad in Muzaffarnagar. In 1916, Miyan Deobandi entered the Persian class of the Darul Uloom Deoband and graduated in the traditional dars-e-nizami in 1925. His teachers include Anwar Shah Kashmiri, Asghar Hussain Deobandi, Izaz Ali Amrohi and Shabbir Ahmad Usmani. He was a disciple of Hussain Ahmad Madani.

Muhammad Miyan started taught at the Madrasa Hanfiyah in Arrah, Bihar for two years from 1926 to 1928. He later taught at the Madrasa Shahi in Moradabad for a span of sixteen years, starting from March 1928. During these sixteen years, Muhammad Miyan served as a Mufti, rector and as a teacher. After 1947, he shifted to Delhi permanently, and was appointed as the member of the executive council of Madrasa Shahi. In 1380 AH, he was appointed as the honorary rector of the Shahi, and later in 1395 AH made the rector.

In 1930, Muhammad Miyan was appointed as the secretary of the Moradabad unit of the Jamiat Ulama-e-Hind (JUH). Later, he served as the secretary of the Agra and Awadh units of the JUH. He also served as the secretary of preaching department of JUH Agra. On 7 May 1945, he was appointed as the secretary of the JUH, and as the general secretary after the death of Hifzur Rahman Seoharwi; a post he served for a year only, resigning a year later. He was then appointed as a member of the JUH's general body, secretary of Jamiat Trust, and the manager of Idāra Mabahith-e-Fiqhiyyah in Delhi. He was appointed as the senior Hadīth professor and senior Mufti of the Madrasa Aminia, where he served until his death in 1975.

Muhammad Miyan died in Delhi on 24 October 1975, aged 72. He is referred as Mu'arrikh-e-Millat for his historical works. His followers refer him as Sayyid-ul-Millat. His students include Mufti Mahmud, Athar Mubarakpuri and Asir Adrawi.

== Literary works ==
Muhammad Miyan Deobandi's works include:

- Ahd-e-Zarrin awr Misali Hukumatein
- Aseeran-e-Malta
- Mishkat al-Athaar
- Shah Abdul Aziz: Afkaar-o-Khidmaat
- Panipat aur Buzurgan-e-Panipat
- Jamiat Ulama-e-Hind Kya Hai?
- Shawahid-e-Taqaddus
- Tareekh-e-Islam
- Tehreek Reshmi Rumaal (Translated to English as Silk Letter Movement by Muhammadullah Khalili Qasmi).
- Ulama-e-Hind Ka Shandaar Maazi (2 volumes)
- Ulama-e-Haqq Aur Unke Mujahidana Karname (2 volumes)
- Waliullahi Tehreek

== See also ==
- List of Indian writers

== Bibliography ==
- Amini, Nur Alam Khalil (February 2017). "Hadhrat Mawlānā Sayyid Muḥammad Miyān Deobandi thumma al-Dehlawi". Pas-e-Marg-e-Zindah (in Urdu) (5 ed.). Deoband: Idara Ilm-o-Adab. pp. 37–107.
