= Abdul Bari Firangi Mahali =

Indian Muslim scholar (1878–1926)

Abdul Bari Firangi Mahli

Personal life
- Born: 1878
- Died: 1926 (aged 47–48)

Religious life
- Religion: Islam

Abdul Bari Firangi Mahali (1878–1926) was an Indian Muslim scholar and writer from the Firangi Mahal palace in Lucknow. He authored 111 books.

== History ==
His ancestors moved from Sihali, Barabanki to the Firangi Mahal around 1692. In 1915, he was residing in Lucknow.

== Politics ==
During the First World War he asked the Sultan of Turkey to support Britain or remain out of the war.

On 26 January 1919 he presided over a protest meeting in Lucknow against the British attitude against Muslims.

He was highly active in the Khilafat movement.

He preached Hindu-Muslim unity, especially during the Khilafat agitation, and was an associate of Mahatma Gandhi. On other occasions, he urged Muslims not to sacrifice cows in respect of the Hindus.

== Institutions ==
- In his opposition to Western education, he founded Madarssa-i-Nizamia in Lucknow.
- He set up Anjuman-i-Khuddam-i-Kabba (1914) to prevent desecration of Muslim Holy places by the British.
- He was the founder member of Darul Mussannefin Shibli Academy, (1915–1916).
- He was the founder member of Jamia Millia Islamia in United Provinces, India (1920).

== See also ==
- Ansari (nesbat)
- Islam in India
