= Mahmood Madani =

Indian politician

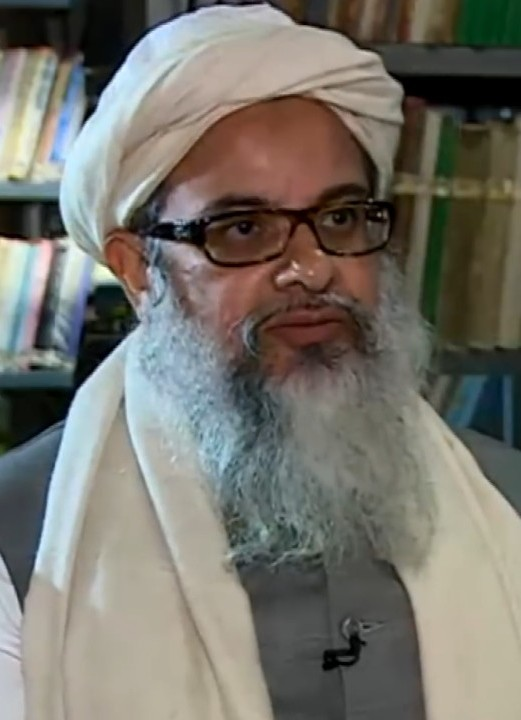

Member of Parliament, Rajya Sabha
- In office 3 April 2006 – 2 April 2012
- Succeeded by: Rasheed Masood
- Constituency: Uttar Pradesh

President of Jamiat Ulama-e-Hind (M)
- Incumbent
- Assumed office 27 May 2021
- Preceded by: Usman Mansoorpuri

1st General Secretary of Jamiat Ulama-e-Hind (M)
- In office 5 April 2008 – 27 March 2021
- Preceded by: Office Established
- Succeeded by: Hakeemuddin Qasmi

11th General Secretary of Jamiat Ulama-e-Hind
- In office 2001 – 5 March 2008
- Preceded by: Abdul Aleem Farooqui
- Succeeded by: Office Bifurcated: Mahmood Madani as the 1st General Secretary of Jamiat Ulama-e-Hind (M); Abdul Aleem Farooqi as the 1st General Secretary of Jamiat Ulama-e-Hind (A)

Personal details
- Born: 3 March 1964 (age 62) Deoband, Uttar Pradesh, India
- Party: Rashtriya Lok Dal
- Parent: Asad Madani (father)
- Profession: Islamic scholar, Politician
- Awards: Man of the Year 2023 The 500 Most Influential Muslims

Mahmood Asad Madani (born 3 March 1964) is an Indian Islamic scholar, activist, politician, and president of the Mahmood faction of the Jamiat Ulama-e-Hind religious organisation. He formerly served as the general secretary of Jamiat Ulama-e-Hind (JUH), and as member of the Rashtriya Lok Dal (RLD) party in the Rajya Sabha (the Indian upper house) in the state of Uttar Pradesh from 2006 to 2012. He is ranked 15th on the list of The 500 Most Influential Muslims.

== Early life and education ==
Madani was born on 3 March 1964 in Deoband, Uttar Pradesh, the son of the Islamic scholar and politician Asad Madni. He attended the Darul Uloom Deoband Islamic seminary, where he graduated in 1992.

== Career ==
Madani joined the Jamiat Ulema-e-Hind (JUH) religious organisation, where he served as the organising secretary in 2001. He was appointed as the general secretary of the organisation later that year, a position which he held until 2008, whereupon he served as the general secretary of the organisation's Mahmood faction until 27 March 2021.

He was later appointed as the interim president of Mahmood faction of the JUH on 27 May 2021 following the death of his predecessor Usman Mansoorpuri. He was elevated to the position of president on 18 September 2021. He is ranked 27th on the list of The 500 Most Influential Muslims, which is published by the Royal Islamic Strategic Studies Centre.

== Activism ==
Madani led JUH relief and advocacy efforts in the aftermath of the 2001 Gujarat Earthquake and the subsequent period of ethno-religious violence in 2002. He co-founded the Save India Front with the All-India Confederation of SC/ST Organisations in April 2002, which organised a multi-religious rally in Delhi that demonstrated against the ethno-religious conflict in Gujarat in May 2002. This rally was jointly led by Madani. He later led a march of over 10,000 protestors to the Prime Minister's Residence in Delhi on 15 October 2002 to protest against ethno-religious violence inflicted upon the Muslim community. A JUH delegation was later received by then-prime minister of India Atal Bihari Vajpayee. Madani also organised protests through the JUH against the visit of then-American President George W. Bush in 2006.

Madani was active in the leadership of the Ganaunnayan Janadhikar Sangram Committee (an alliance of 22 local and national organisations) during the period of civil unrest in Nandigram in 2007. He also launched an anti-terrorism campaign through the JUH in 2008, which involved the issuing of a Fatwa by his alma mater Darul Uloom Deoband in May 2008, which condemned terrorist activity as anti-Islamic. This Fatwa was later ratified by multiple other Islamic organisations in India, including the Darul Uloom Nadwatul Ulama, the Jamaat-e-Islami Hind and the All India Muslim Personal Law Board. Madani also conducted several other anti-terrorism conferences and rallies in various Indian cities.

In the wake of the 2010 period of violence in Kashmir, Madani, through the JUH, organised multiple conferences in Deoband and Delhi, on 4 October 2010 and 31 October 2010, respectively, which were attended by clerics, legal experts, and activists. An eleven-point resolution of demands was passed by both conferences, which reiterated the place of Kashmir within India but also demanded the demilitarisation of Kashmir and the revocation of the Armed Forces Special Powers Act and the Public Safety Act. Madani also sponsored the release of commemorative postal stamps on the Silk Letter Movement and Hussain Ahmad Madani.

Madani responded to the 2013 period of ethno-religious violence in Muzaffarnagar and Rajasthan by directing criticism towards the governments of these states, comparing the scale of violence with that of Gujarat. Madani also wrote to then-prime minister Manmohan Singh, demanding the dismissal of then-Chief Minister of Uttar Pradesh Akhilesh Yadav. In December 2013, Madani organised conferences in Deoband and Delhi as part of the Silk Letter Movement Centenary Celebrations. The conferences were attended by approximately 200 Islamic scholars and religious leaders from multiple countries, including the Maldives, Britain, Pakistan and Myanmar, and advocated for peaceful, dialogue-based solutions to conflicts, as well as the reiteration of the anti-terrorism Fatwa issued by Darul Uloom Deoband in 2008. Madani also organised protests against ISIL in November 2015 through the JUH. These protests were held in 75 cities across India.

Madani organised protests through the JUH against the visit of then-Israeli President Reuven Rivlin in November 2016, the United States' recognition of Jerusalem as the capital of the State of Israel in December 2017, and the visit of then-prime minister of Israel Benjamin Netanyahu in January 2018. The protests in December 2017 were estimated to have been attended by approximately 10 million people, and were held nationwide. The protests in January 2018 against Netanyahu's visit were met with opposition from the authorities in Ahmedabad. Members of the local JUH organisation were denied position to protest and were later harassed and detained by local authorities.

Madani protested against the August 2017 Supreme Court ruling on triple talaq, a form of Islamic divorce, which led to the introduction of the Muslim Women (Protection of Rights on Marriage) Act, 2019 that criminalised triple talaq. He criticised the ruling and subsequent legislation, stating that it would cause injustice against Muslim women. Madani also led protests in Pune in August 2017 against ethno-religious violence in India, as part of a wider nationwide peace movement that was launched by the JUH in approximately 800 cities in India. Madani also led demonstrations in support of the Rohingya refugees at the Jantar Mantar observatory in Delhi on 21 September 2017, where he condemned deportations of refugees and demanded that the Indian government handle the refugee crisis on a humanitarian basis.

In May 2018, he established a Civil Services Examination coaching centre with the Zakat Foundation of India for approximately 500 candidates. In July 2018, Madani established the Jamiat Youth Club (affiliated with the JUH), which was modelled after the Bharat Scouts and Guides organisation. Madani expressed his intentions to expand the Jamiat Youth Club gradually through expanding membership by 1.25 million each year, with a target membership of 12.5 million across 100 districts by 2028.

Following the abrogation of Article 370 on 5 August 2019 and the subsequent period of civil unrest in Kashmir, Madani convened a meeting of leading Muslim organisations and religious leaders in India through the JUH, where he co-sponsored a unanimous resolution that questioned the way of abrogating Article 370, called for the restoration of normalcy and the protection of human rights in Kashmir, while also supporting the integrity and stability of India. The central organising council of the JUH passed a similar resolution on 12 September 2019, which was also presented by Madani. This resolution was later presented to the Indian Minister of Home Affairs, Amit Shah, by a JUH delegation. However, Madani's strong support for national integrity, which he expressed on a variety of media platforms, including the Geneva Press Club, was met with opposition from the Indian Islamic community, who viewed it as an expression of support for the Indian government.

On 6 October 2019, Madani criticised Amit Shah for his role in the National Register of Citizens (NRC), and the Citizenship (Amendment) Act, 2019 (CAA). Madani also called for nationwide protests against the CAA, which were held nationwide at over 1000 locations in December 2019. Madani would later continue to lead protests against the CAA. The JUH, under Madani's leadership, also called for a complete boycott of the NRC process. Madani also led relief and advocacy efforts for the victims of the 2020 Delhi Riots.

During the initial phase of the COVID-19 pandemic in India, Madani offered the use of 10,000 isolation centres in a letter to the Prime Minister, Narendra Modi. In February 2021, Madani launched the Jamiat Open School through the JUH in order to provide secondary and higher secondary education to Madrassa students.

== Jihad controversy ==
In December 2025, at a national meeting of the Jamiat Ulema-i-Hind in Bhopal, Madani defended the meaning of jihad and criticized what he described as distortions of the concept in Indian political discourse. He argued that "if there is oppression, there will be jihad," presenting it as a moral principle of justice rather than violence. Madani stated that jihad "was and will always remain holy" and defined it as a struggle "for the good and betterment of others." He accused the government and media of misusing the term through labels such as "love jihad," "spit jihad," and "land jihad."

Madani also urged Muslims to engage with India's "silent majority," estimating that 10 percent of people supported Muslims, 30 percent opposed them, and 60 percent remained neutral. He warned that hostility from this majority would pose a serious danger to the country. His remarks included criticism of the judiciary, asserting that "the Supreme Court is entitled to be called 'Supreme' only as long as the Constitution is protected there."

The speech drew sharp responses from political opponents. Rameshwar Sharma, a legislator from the Bharatiya Janata Party (BJP), accused Madani of provoking Muslims and undermining national institutions, likening him to "new Jinnahs" and alleging that his rhetoric encouraged extremism. Sharma warned that India would not tolerate "anti-national activities at any cost."

Observers noted that the exchange highlighted contrasting perspectives: Madani's emphasis on constitutional rights and reformist engagement versus Sharma's framing of dissent as extremism within a majoritarian nationalist narrative.

== Personal life ==
Madani has a brother, Masood Madani, who is also a politician.
