= Asad Madani =

Indian Muslim scholar and politician (1928 – 2006)

Maulana As’ad Madani

Member of Parliament, Rajya Sabha
- In office 3 April 1974 – 2 April 1980
- Constituency: Uttar Pradesh
- In office 5 July 1980 – 5 July 1986
- Constituency: Uttar Pradesh
- In office 3 July 1988 – 2 July 1994
- Constituency: Uttar Pradesh

7th President of Jamiat Ulama-e-Hind
- In office 11 August 1973 – 6 February 2006
- Preceded by: Syed Fakhruddin Ahmad
- Succeeded by: Arshad Madani (A group); Usman Mansoorpuri (M group)

6th General Secretary of Jamiat Ulama-e-Hind
- In office 9 August 1963 – 10 August 1973
- Preceded by: Muhammad Miyan Deobandi
- Succeeded by: Syed Ahmad Hashmi

Personal details
- Born: 27 April 1928 Moradabad, British India
- Died: 6 February 2006 (aged 77) Apollo Hospital, Delhi, India
- Resting place: Mazar-e-Qasmi, Deoband, Uttar Pradesh, India
- Citizenship: British Indian (1928-1947); Indian (1947-2006)
- Party: Indian National Congress
- Children: Mahmood Madani
- Parent: Hussain Ahmad Madani (father)
- Relatives: Brothers: Arshad Madani, Asjad Madani
- Education: Darul Uloom Deoband
- Profession: Politician, islamic scholar
- Awards: Friends of Liberation War Honour

Religious life
- Religion: Islam
- Denomination: Sunni
- Jurisprudence: Hanafi
- Movement: Deobandi

Muslim leader
- Disciples: Ishaq Faridi
- Influenced: Farid Uddin Masood

As’ad Madani (27 April 1928 – 6 February 2006) was an Indian Deobandi Islamic scholar and a politician, who served as the sixth general secretary and the seventh President of the Jamiat Ulema-e-Hind. He was a member of the executive body of Darul Uloom Deoband. He was a member of the Rajya Sabha, upper house of the Parliament of India representing Uttar Pradesh for three terms as a member of the Indian National Congress.

== Early life and education ==
Asad Madni was born in 1928 to Hussain Ahmad Madani in Moradabad at his maternal uncle's home. He was raised in Madani Manzil in Deoband. He graduated from Darul Uloom Deoband in 1945. He then stayed in Madinah for a few years before returning as teacher at Darul Uloom Deoband for 12 years.

== Career ==
In 1960, he was appointed as the president of the Uttar Pradesh circle of Jamiat Ulama-e-Hind and on 9 August 1963, he was appointed as the general secretary of the Jamiat Ulama-e-Hind. He became the president of Jamiat Ulama-e-Hind on 11 August 1973. He was president of Jamiat Ulama-e-Hind for 32 years. He was a member of the upper house of the Indian parliament from 1968 to 1974, 1980 to 1986 and 1988 to 1994.

== Death and legacy ==
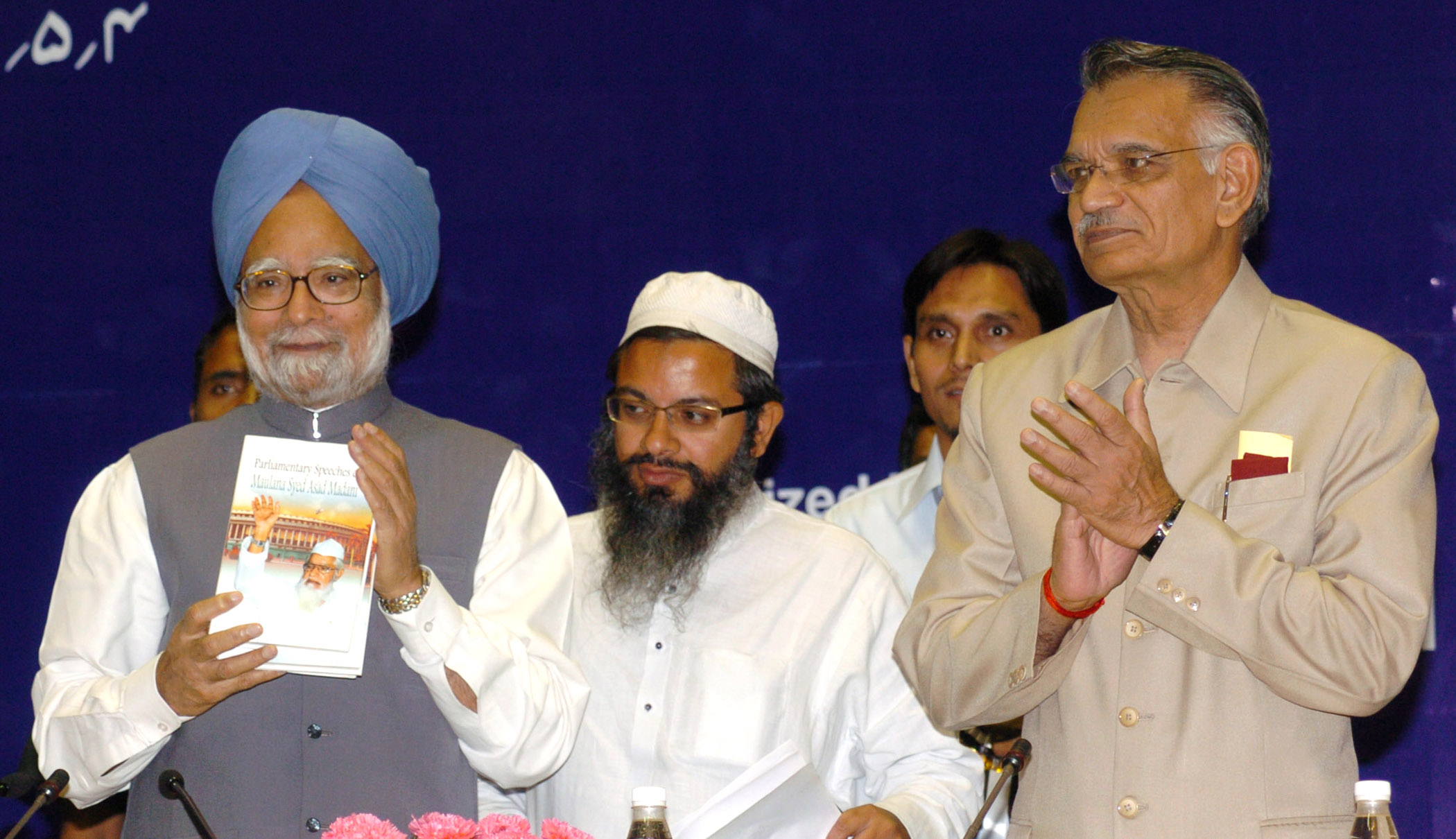
Prime Minister Manmohan Singh releasing the parliamentary speeches of Asad Madni

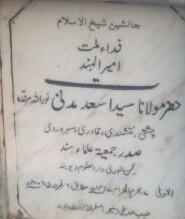
Inscription on the grave of As‘ad Madani

On 6 February 2006, Madani died in Delhi, India. He is survived by his son, Mahmood Madani, who is the current president of Jamiat Ulama-e-Hind (M).

An international seminar was organized in his memory in New Delhi on 23 and 24 April 2007. Madani's parliamentary speeches were released by the former Prime Minister of India Manmohan Singh in the same seminar.

He is a very popular figure in the neighbouring country of Bangladesh which he frequently used to visit. He first visited eastern Bengal in 1933, and since 1973 he used to go there nearly every year. During the Bangladesh Liberation War of 1971, Madni strongly protested against the brutal torture of the Pakistan Army and its allied forces, and distributed adequate aid to the memorial camps. He projected his views to stop the torture of innocent Bengalis and marched in the streets of Delhi with more than fifty thousand Indian Muslims in favour of Bangladesh. His last visit to the country was on 2 April 2005 when he was an honorary guest at the National Conference of Jamiat Ulema-e-Islam Bangladesh at Paltan Maidan, Dhaka.

== See more ==
- List of Deobandis

== Bibliography ==
- Salman Mansoorpuri, ed. (May 2012). Tazkirah Fidā-e-Millat. New Delhi: Jamiat Ulama-e-Hind.
