= Jamiat Ulama-i-Hind =

Council of Indian Muslim theologians

Jamiat Ulema-e-Hind
- Formation: November 1919 (106 years ago)
- Founders: Abdul Bari Firangi Mahali; Ahmad Saeed Dehlavi; Kifayatullah Dehlawi; Ibrahim Sialkoti; Sanaullah Amritsari and others.
- Type: Religious organisation, NGO
- Legal status: Active
- Headquarters: 1, Bahadur Shah Zafar Marg, New Delhi
- Location: ITO
- Region served: India
- Members: Over 12 Million, and millions of followers.
- Official languages: Urdu and English
- Secretary General: Masoom Saqib Qasmi (A); Hakeemuddin Qasmi (M)
- President: Arshad Madani (A); Mahmood Madani (M)
- Publication: Al-Kifah (1973–1987)
- Website: Official website of M group; Official website of A group
- The Jamiat Ulama-e-Hind split into two groups in March 2008, one being the Arshad group and the other Mahmood group, both denoted with "A" and "M".

Jamiat Ulama-i-Hind or Jamiat Ulema-e-Hind (Urdu: جمعیۃ علماءِ ہند transl. Council of Indian Muslim Theologians) is one of the leading organisations of Islamic scholars belonging to the Deobandi school of thought in India. It was founded in November 1919 by a group of Muslim scholars including Abdul Bari Firangi Mahali, Kifayatullah Dehlawi, Muhammad Ibrahim Mir Sialkoti and Sanaullah Amritsari.

The Jamiat was an active participant in the Khilafat Movement in collaboration with the Indian National Congress. It also opposed the partition of India, taking the position of composite nationalism: that Muslims and non-Muslims form one nation. As a result, this organisation had a small break-away faction known as the Jamiat Ulema-e-Islam, which decided to support the Pakistan movement.

The constitution of the Jamiat was drafted by Kifayatullah Dehlawi. As of 2021, it is spread over various states of India and has established institutions and wings such as the Idara Mabahith-e-Fiqhiyyah, the Jamiat National Open School, the Jamiat Ulama-e-Hind Halal Trust, the Legal Cell Institute and the Jamiat Youth Club. Arshad Madani succeeded his brother Asad Madani as the president in February 2006, however the organisation split into the Arshad group and Mahmood group in March 2008. Usman Mansoorpuri became the president of the Mahmood group and continued to serve the position until his death in May 2021. Mahmood Madani succeeded him as the interim president before being appointed the president on 18 September 2021. Arshad Madani serves as the president of Arshad group.

== History ==
=== Inception and development ===
On 23 November 1919, the Khilafat Committee held its first conference in Delhi which was attended by Muslim scholars from all over the India. Afterward, a group of twenty-five Muslim scholars from among them held a separate conference in the hall of Krishna Theatre, in Delhi, and formed the Jamiat Ulama-e-Hind. These scholars included Abdul Bari Firangi Mahali, Ahmad Saeed Dehlavi, Kifayatullah Dihlawi, Muniruzzaman Khan, Mohammad Akram Khan, Muhammad Ibrahim Mir Sialkoti, Dawood Ghaznavi and Sanaullah Amritsari. Other scholars included Abdul Haleem Gayawi, Azad Subhani, Bakhsh Amritsari, Ibrahim Darbhangawi, Muhammad Abdullah, Muhammad Imam Sindhi, Muhammad Asadullah Sindhi, Muhammad Fakhir, Muhammad Anees, Muhammad Sadiq, Khuda Bakhsh Muzaffarpuri, Khwaja Ghulam Nizamuddin, Qadeer Bakhsh, Salamatullah, Sayyid Ismail, Sayyid Kamaluddin, and Taj Muhammad.

Jamiat, also romanised as "jam'iyyat", is a term in an Islamic context referring to an assembly, league or other organisation. The word originated from the Arabic word for gathering (جمع), and is used in Urdu as a noun.

The first general meeting of the Jamiat Ulema-e-Hind was held at Amritsar on 28 December 1919, at the request of Sanaullah Amritsari, in which Kifayatullah Dehlawi presented a draft of its constitution. Abul Muhasin Sajjad and Mazharuddin are also mentioned among the key founders. A common misconception exists that the Jamiat was founded by Mahmud Hasan Deobandi and his other colleagues including Hussain Ahmad Madani, however this is not true as they were jailed in Malta at the time the organisation was founded.

When the Jamiat Ulema-e-Hind was founded, Kifayatullah Dehlawi was appointed interim president and Ahmad Saeed Dehlavi was made an interim secretary. The Jamiat formed its first governing body at its first general meeting, which was held at Amritsar. The second general meeting of the Jamiat was held during November 1920 in Delhi, where Mahmud Hasan Deobandi was appointed the president and Kifayatullah Dehlawi the vice-president. Hasan died several days after (on 30 November) and Kifayatullah continued to serve as the vice-president whilst concurrently serving as interim-president, until he was permanently appointed president on 6 September 1921. The scholars of the Darul Uloom Deoband associated with the Jamiat only after Mahmud Hasan Deobandi was released, and they had no substantial role in its establishment. It is now considered a major organisation belonging to the scholars of Deoband.

=== Governance ===
The earliest principles and constitution of the Jamiat were written by Kifayatullah Dehlawi. In the first general meeting in Amritsar it was decreed that these be published and opinions gathered from a group of scholars in attendance, and that it then be discussed again at the next meeting. The principles and constitution were ratified in the second meeting, held in Delhi and presided over by Mahmud Hasan Deobandi. There it was decided that the organisation would be called the "Jamiat Ulama-e-Hind", its headquarters located in Delhi, and its stamp state, "Al-Jamiat al-Markaziyyah li al-Ulama il-Hind" (transl. "The Central Council of the Scholars of India"). It aimed to defend Islam from any external or alien threat; to guide common folk in politics through the lens of Islamic precepts; and to establish an Islamic court, the Darul Qadha.

The first governing body of the Jamiat Ulama-e-Hind was formed in Amritsar. Its members included Abdul Majid Badayuni, Abul Muhasin Sajjad, Ahmad Saeed Dehlavi, Hakim Ajmal Khan, Hasrat Mohani, Khuda Bakhsh, Mazharuddin, Muhammad Abdullah Sindhi, Muhammad Fakhir Allahabadi, Muniruzzaman Khan, Mohammad Akram Khan, Muhammad Ibrahim Mir Sialkoti, Muhammad Sadiq Karachivi, Ruknuddin Dāna, Salamatullah Farangimahali, Sanaullah Amritsari, Sayyid Muhammad Dawood Ghaznawi and Turab Ali Sindhi.

The first working committee was formed over 9 and 10 February 1922, in Delhi. It consisted of nine people; Abdul Haleem Siddiqi, Abdul Majid Qadri Badayuni, Abdul Qadir Qusoori, Ahmadullah Panipati, Hakim Ajmal Khan, Hasrat Mohani, Kifayatullah Dehlawi, Mazharuddin and Shabbir Ahmad Usmani. In March 1922 the number was increased to twelve, and Abdul Qadeer Badayuni, Azad Subhani and Ibrahim Sialkoti were added to the working body. The Jamiat elected Murtaza Hasan Chandpuri and Nisar Ahmad Kanpuri as the vice-presidents on 15 January 1925.

The Jamiat has an organisational network which is spread across India. It also has an Urdu daily newspaper, the Al-Jamiyat. The newspaper was banned by the British government of India in 1938, but was restarted on 23 December 1947 with Muhammad Miyan Deobandi appointed its editor. The Jamiat propounds a theological basis for its nationalistic philosophy, which is that Muslims and non-Muslims have entered upon a mutual contract in India, since independence, to establish a secular state. The Constitution of India represents this contract. This is known in Urdu as a mu'ahadah. Accordingly, as the Muslim community's elected representatives support and swear allegiance to this mu'ahadah, so too is it the responsibility of Indian Muslims to support the Indian Constitution. This mu'ahadah is similar to a previous similar contract signed between the Muslims and the Jews in Medina.

=== Independence movement ===
On 8 September 1920, the Jamiat issued a religious edict, called Fatwa Tark-e-Mawalat, boycotting British goods. This was authored by Abul Muhasin Sajjad and signed by 500 scholars. During the British Raj, the Jamiat opposed British rule in India and participated in the Quit India Movement. Since its inception in 1919 it aimed for a "British-free India". It formed an institution called "Idārah Harbiyyah" (transl. The War Council) during the civil disobedience movement.

Hifzur Rahman Seoharwi, a prominent scholar of the Jamiat speaking at a conference and sharing stage with Abul Kalam Azad and Jawahar Lal Nehru.

The Jamiat's scholars were arrested frequently, and its general secretary Ahmad Saeed Dehlavi spent fifteen years of his life in jail. The Jamiat secured pledges from the Muslim community that they would avoid using British cloth and enrolled about fifteen thousand volunteers to participate in the Salt March. Kifayatullah Dehlawi, the co-founder of the Jamiat, was imprisoned in Gujarat jail for six months in 1930 for participating in the civil disobedience movement. On 31 March 1932, he was arrested for leading a procession of over a hundred thousand people and imprisoned in Multan jail for eighteen months. The general secretary of the Jamiat, Muhammad Miyan Deobandi, was arrested five times and his book Ulama-e-Hind ka Shāndār Māzī (transl. The Glorious Past of Indian Scholars) was seized for discussing the struggles of Muslim scholars against the ruling people, including the British Raj. Hifzur Rahman Seoharwi, another scholar of the Jamiat, was arrested multiple times for campaigning against British colonialism. He spent eight years in incarceration.

=== Partition of India ===
Hussain Ahmad Madani, the principal of the Darul Uloom Deoband (from 1927 to 1957) and the leading Deobandi scholar of the day, held that Muslims were unquestionably part of a united India and that Hindu-Muslim unity was necessary for the country's freedom. He worked closely with the Indian National Congress until the Partition of India was carried out. In 1945, a faction emerged within Jamiat Ulema-e-Hind that supported the creation of Pakistan and the All Indian Muslim League. This faction was led by a founding member of the Jamiat, Shabbir Ahmad Usmani. The Jamiat Ulema-e-Hind was a member of the All India Azad Muslim Conference, which included several Islamic organisations standing for a united India.

Ishtiaq Ahmed states that, in return for their support, the Jamiat Ulema-e-Hind obtained a pledge from the Indian leadership that the state would not interfere with the Muslim Personal Law. The former Prime Minister of India, Jawahar Lal Nehru agreed with the pledge, however, he believed that Muslims should first reform these laws. Despite these concessions, during the Partition of India, there erupted riots all over the country which resulted in wholesale carnage and numerous Muslims were killed; Jamiat Ulema-e-Hind played a key role in securing the life and safety of Muslims. Syed Mehboob Rizwi says that the general secretary of the Jamiat, Hifzur Rahman Seoharwi, "faced the grave conditions with unusual spirit, daring, resolution, and exerted pressure on the leaders and officials, and accomplished the great exploit of restoring peace and order, and dispelled fear and apprehension from the hearts of terror-stricken Muslims."

Following India's independence, the Jamiat Ulema-e-Hind reassessed its political role and decided to disengage from electoral politics. The organisation reaffirmed its commitment to the preservation of Muslim faith and culture, officially transitioning to a non-political entity on March 20, 1948.

=== Split into JUH-A and JUH-M ===
In March 2008, after the death of its former president Asad Madni, Jamiat Ulema-e-Hind split into two factions. The division was caused by differences between Arshad Madani and his nephew Mahmood Madani after Arshad Madani was accused of being involved in anti-Jamiat activities. A contemporaneous report by the Hindustan Times alleged that Arshad "had dissolved elected units and disintegrated its democratic structure to establish his personal rule." Consequently, on 5 March 2006, Arshad was dismissed as the president of the united Jamiat, leading him to form a new executive committee which he claimed to be the true Jamiat. The existing Jamiat was led by Mahmood Madani, and on the 5 April 2008 this faction appointed Usman Mansoorpuri as their first president. The first general secretary of the Arshad faction was Abdul Aleem Farooqui, who also served as the tenth general secretary of the united Jamiat Ulema-e-Hind from 1995 to 2001.

=== Centenary ===
The Jamiat celebrated its centenary in November 2019. The Jamiat Ulema-e-Islam (F) held the centenary celebrations in Azakhel over two days starting on 7 April 2017. It was attended by Saleh bin Abdul-Aziz Al ash-Sheikh.

=== Anti-terror edict ===
In November 2008, 6000 scholars endorsed an anti-terror edict in the 29th general body meeting of the Jamiat Ulema-e-Hind, held at Hyderabad. The edict was issued by the Darul Uloom Deoband and signed by its Grand Mufti, Habibur Rahman Khairabadi, in May 2008. In the general meeting, Mahmood Madani said that, "it is a demonstration of the faith the Muslim scholars are reposing in the importance and timeliness of the edict. When these delegates go back to their homes they would take the signed Hyderabad Declaration that endorses the stand taken by Darul Uloom against terrorism." This meeting was attended by Ravi Sankar and Swami Agnivesh. The fatwa stated that "Islam rejects all kinds of unwarranted violence, breach of peace, bloodshed, killing and plunder and does not allow it in any form. It is the basic principle of Islam that you assist each other in pursuit of good righteous causes and do not co-operate with anyone for committing sin or oppression. It is evident in the clear cut guidelines given in the Holy Quran that the allegation of terrorism against a religion like Islam which enjoins world peace is nothing but a lie. In fact Islam was born to wipe off all kinds of terrorism and to spread the message of global peace".

=== Hindu relations ===
In 2009, Jamiat Ulema-e-Hind said that Hindus should not be called kafirs (infidels) because, even though the term only means a "Non-Muslim," its use may cause misunderstanding between communities. The Jamiat passed a resolution in November 2009 describing Vande Mataram as an anti-Islamic song and received opposition from Muslim Rashtriya Manch national convener, Mohammed Afzal stating "Our Muslim brothers should not follow the fatwa as Vande Mataram is the national song of the country and every Indian citizen should respect and recite it."

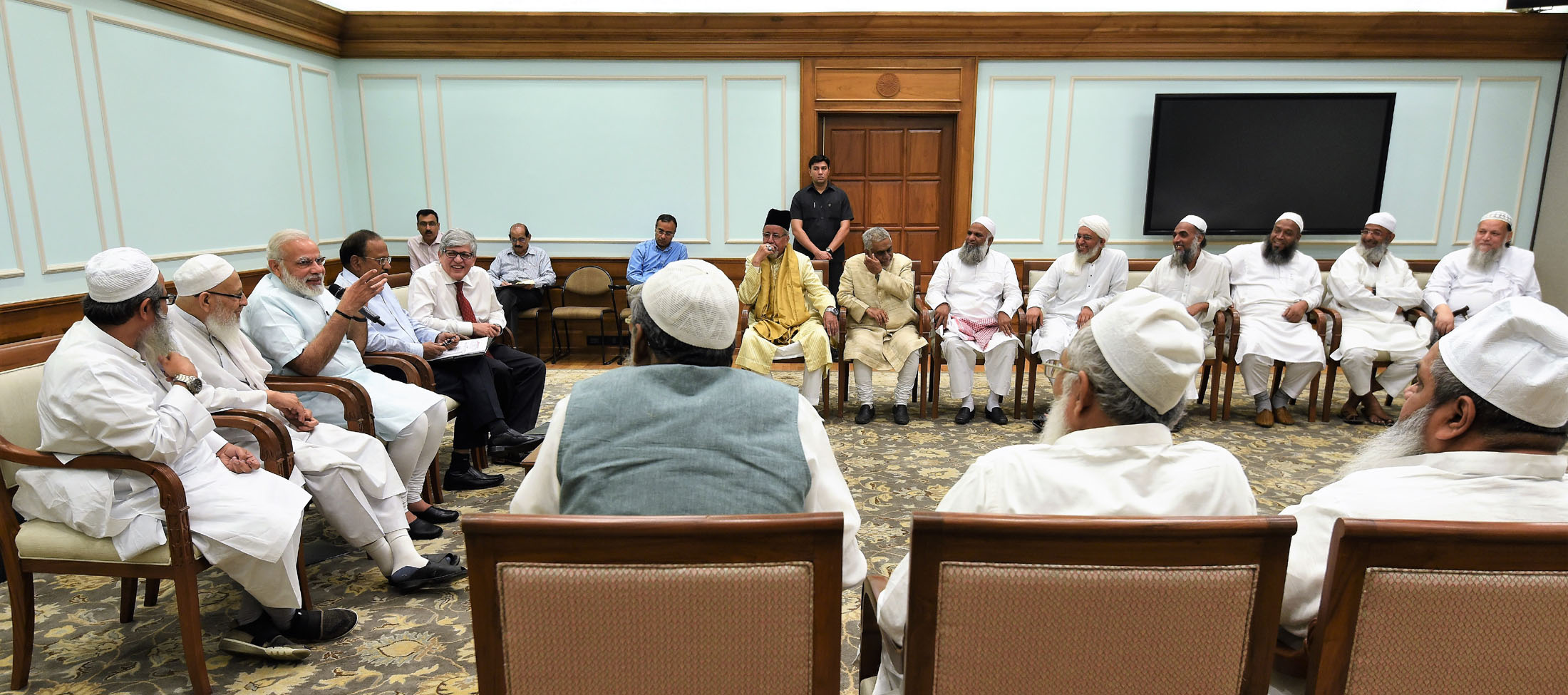
A delegation of scholars from the Mahmood Madani faction of Jamiat Ulama-e-Hind led by President Usman Mansoorpuri, meeting the Indian Prime Minister, Narendra Modi on 9 May 2017.

In 1934, a few sections of the Babri Masjid mosque were vandalised and pictures of Hindu deities with Ram inscribed upon them were placed inside the mosque. The president of the Jamiat, Kifayatullah Dehlawi, visited Ayodhya and later presented a report to the Jamiat's working committee. The working committee followed the Babri Masjid case and during a February 1952 meeting, presided over by Hussain Ahmad Madani and attended by Abul Kalam Azad and Hifzur Rahman Seoharwi, it was decided that the issue should be pursued through legal channels. Subsequently, in February 1986, the district sessions judge of Faizabad, Krishna Mohan Pandey, ordered the removal of locks on the Babri Masjid gates to allow Hindus to worship. The Jamiat scholars Asad Madani and Asrarul Haq Qasmi appealed to the Indian government to take action against the judge and simultaneously raised a petition against this order. A memorandum was presented to Rajiv Gandhi on 3 March 1986, and he was asked to take a personal interest in the case and help resolve the matter. The Jamiat formed a committee on 22 February 1986 to follow-up the Babri Masjid case. It included Jalil Ahmad Seoharwi, Muhammad Matin, and advocates Zafaryab Jilani and Muhammad Raa'iq. In 2019, when the Supreme court of India ordered that the Babri Masjid be given up for the construction of the Ram Mandir and 5 acres of land be given to Muslims for the construction of a new mosque to replace it, the Jamiat described it as "the darkest spot in the history of free India." Arshad Madani said that although Muslim organisations lost the Babri Masjid, the Jamiat Ulama-e-Hind would continue fighting for the safety and protection of other places of worship.

In an interview with the Economic Times, Arshad Madani said that "We are citizens of this country and we have the rights over our places. We will continue to protect them till we die. Fate of one case is not fate of all cases. We still have faith in the judiciary of our country." The position of the Jamiat was that no alternate site was acceptable for the Babri Masjid and Muslim organisations should not accept any offered replacement land or money.

=== National Register of Citizens ===
The Mahmood faction of the Jamiat defended the Assam Accord during May 2017 under the leadership of Usman Mansoorpuri in the Supreme Court of India. They also passed a resolution in support of the National Register of Citizens. The Arshad faction's president Arshad Madani, however, said that, "the NPR-NRC project is part of the Central government's communal agenda to transform India into a Hindu nation." He also holds that it is a "big threat to Muslims and also some other communities, including Dalits." Consequently, in December 2019, the Mahmood faction filed a challenge to the Citizenship (Amendment) Act, 2019 in the Supreme Court of India on the grounds that "the law classified immigrants without any "intelligible differentia" and ignored several religiously persecuted minorities." The faction also held Kashmir as an integral part of India.

On the 2020 Delhi riots, Arshad Madani said in October 2020 that "it is not possible to control riots in the country without making the district administration accountable." According to an October 2020 Ummid report, the Jamiat under his leadership was fighting the cases of Muslims accused in the Delhi riots and sixteen bail petitions were accepted by the Delhi High Court.

=== Dowries ===
After a young woman named Ayesha committed suicide and her video went viral, the Pune circle of the Jamiat launched a campaign against dowry practices in March 2021. Scholars of the Jamiat said that they would use Friday prayers as a platform to make people aware of the issue.

=== Implementation of population policy ===
JUH's Assam faction stated on 5 July 2021 that "the Jamiat will not support the [Indian government's population policy] if the government forcefully implements it". Secretary Fazlul Karim Kasimi said that "birth control policies cannot be imposed upon minorities and population policy should be applicable to the majority. There should be a law on birth control for the majority."

=== COVID-19 vaccinations ===
In June 2021, the Jamiat Ulema-e-Hind's Gujarat unit held camps to raise awareness of COVID-19 vaccines. A group of sixty scholars participated in this drive from areas such as Bhavnagar and Palanpur. A local scholar associated with the Jamiat, Imran Dheriwala, said that, "the community has a deep sense of mistrust towards the government concerning vaccines, but it is because of the faith of the people as well, that it is Allah who decides one's time of death and He protects even if one does not take a vaccine." He also said that, "we are trying to remove this misconception from people, as the teachings of Islam make it necessary for a person to go through medication in order to protect his life and thus vaccinations was necessary, and we are trying to spread this message." The president of Jamiat's Arshad faction, Arshad Madani said that, "Whatever saves human lives is permissible. We should take the vaccine and protect ourselves and everybody around us from Covid-19."

=== Merger process ===
The Times of India reported on 22 June 2022 that the two factions of the Jamiat have begun a merger process which might be materialised very soon. The Hindu reported on 16 July 2022 that "the faction of the younger Madani is said to be agreeable to work under the senior Madani as Jamiat president." On 28 May 2022, the Jamiat's M faction had invited its rival Arshad Madani to attend its general body meeting in Deoband, which he accepted. His acceptance of the invitation has been seen as his first step towards reconciliation. In the Deoband meet, Arshad Madani expressed that "the Jamiat needs to come together so our voice can be stronger."

== Institutions ==
=== Idara Mabahith-e-Fiqhiyyah ===
Jamiat Ulema-e-Hind established the Idara Mabahith-e-Fiqhiyyah (Institute of Juristic Discussions) in 1970 and Muhammad Miyan Deobandi was appointed its first director. The institute organised its fifteenth juristic seminar in March 2019. The seminar discussed whether Google AdSense, Paytm cash and other things related with mobile and internet were allowed under Islamic law. It was attended by Muslim jurists including Saeed Ahmad Palanpuri and Shabbir Ahmad Qasmi.

=== Jamiat Youth Club ===
The Jamiat Youth Club was established in July 2018. It aims to provide youth with training in different self-defense techniques to deal with community crises. It was called a "pilot project" and it was reported that the Jamiat expects to train about 1.25 million youngsters every year and about 12.5 million youth in over a hundred Indian districts are expected to join the Jamiat Youth Club by 2028. Mahmood Madani said that the club will train the youth like the Scouts and Guides, with an emphasis on physical training and different ways to strengthen their mental ability.

=== Halal trust ===
The Jamiat has a halal-declaring agency known as the Jamiat Ulema-e-Hind Halal Trust. It was set up in 2009 and was recognised by the Department of Islamic Development Malaysia in 2011 as "a reliable and authoritative institution for issuing Halal Certificates to meat, meat products and slaughter houses." As of April 2020, its secretary is Niaz Ahmad Farooqi.

In November 2023, the UP government registered an FIR against Jamiat Halal Trust and several other organisations for allegedly providing fake halal certifications. The allegation claimed that this was done to increase sales. However, Jamiat denied the allegations, filed a petition in the Supreme Court, and thereafter received interim protection from any coercive action by the Uttar Pradesh government against the ban on manufacture and sale.

=== Jamiat National Open School ===
Jamiat National Open School was established in February 2021. It is similar to the National Institute of Open Schooling (NIOS), and provides trained staff and infrastructure to students through which they can study computers, mathematics, sciences, language and other subjects offered under the NIOS. The school was established to provide students with high quality and contemporary academic learning, in part because thousands of students graduate from Islamic madrasas every year, but often lack adequate contemporary secular education abilities and skills.

The Jamiat provides scholarships to students undertaking professional courses such as B.Tech, M.Tech, BCA, and other medical and engineering courses. Since 2012 the scholarships are offered to financially weak students through the Taleemi Imdadi Fund.

=== Legal Cell Institute ===
Jamiat Ulema-e-Hind also has the Legal Cell institute, through which it helps Muslims accused of Islamic terrorism to fight legal battles, including individuals like Faheem Ansari and Sabauddin, who were later acquitted in the 2008 Mumbai Attacks. However, not all those aided by the Legal Cell were acquitted. For instance, in the 7/11 Mumbai train blasts case, several Muslim accused who received legal support from the Jamiat were convicted and sentenced to life imprisonment or death, such as Faisal Shaikh and Asif Khan. Similarly, in the 2010 Pune German Bakery blast case, Mirza Himayat Baig, who was aided by the Jamiat, was convicted and sentenced to death in 2013. Same way, several accused were acquitted but many others aided by Jamait Ilema e Hind were convicted of Islamist terrorism in many other cases including Mulund blast case, the Gateway of India blasts case, and the 13/7 Mumbai triple blasts. The Institute has also provided legal aid in high-profile cases involving individuals who were later convicted, such as Yasin Bhatkal, co-accused with Mirza Himayat Baig in the German Bakery blast, who was also convicted and sentenced to death.

It was set up by Arshad Madani in 2007 and, as of May 2019, has aided in 192 acquittals across India. Madani stated he started the institute when he saw that innocent people are picked up and incarcerated regularly on different charges in India and their families spend their savings and sell their assets and homes to fight the legal battle in order to prove their innocence. According to a May 2019 report of The New Indian Express, "the first three cases that the legal cell took up were the 7/11 Mumbai train blasts, the 2006 Malegaon blasts and the Aurangabad Arms haul case in September 2007." The people accused in these were represented by Shahid Azmi, who later defended Faheem Ansari and Sabauddin, both accused of the 2008 Mumbai Attacks. Azmi was however assassinated on 11 February 2010; and the Institute assisted both of them in the trial court and then in the high court. The high court upheld their acquittal, and both were freed of the conspiracy charges. The Institute defended nine Muslim youth who were accused of the 2006 Malegaon blasts; and all of them were acquitted in 2016.

Other cases where the institute has provided legal aid in defense of the accused include those in the Mulund blast case, the Gateway of India blasts case, and the 13/7 Mumbai triple blasts. The institute's support is not limited to Muslims, as they aided a Hindu man in 2012 who was given a death sentence, and he was later acquitted. In March 2019, aided by the institute, eleven Muslims who had been booked under TADA were acquitted by the Special TADA Court after spending 25 years in jail. In June 2021, two men were cleared of the UAPA charges after they spent nine years in jail, and they were seen thanking Gulzar Azmi of the Legal Cell for aiding them in the long legal battle.

The former head of the Legal Cell Institute, Gulzar Azmi, maintains that "We do not have any issues if terrorists are hanged, but what hurts us is when innocent people are falsely booked in terror cases." In a more recent case, the institute has been reported to be helping two people accused of terror activities who have been arrested by the Anti-Terrorism Squad in July 2021. Arshad Madani was quoted as saying about this case that "the process of using terrorism as a weapon to destroy the lives of Muslim youth continues. Out legal struggle will continue till the honourable release of innocent Muslims."

=== Publications division ===
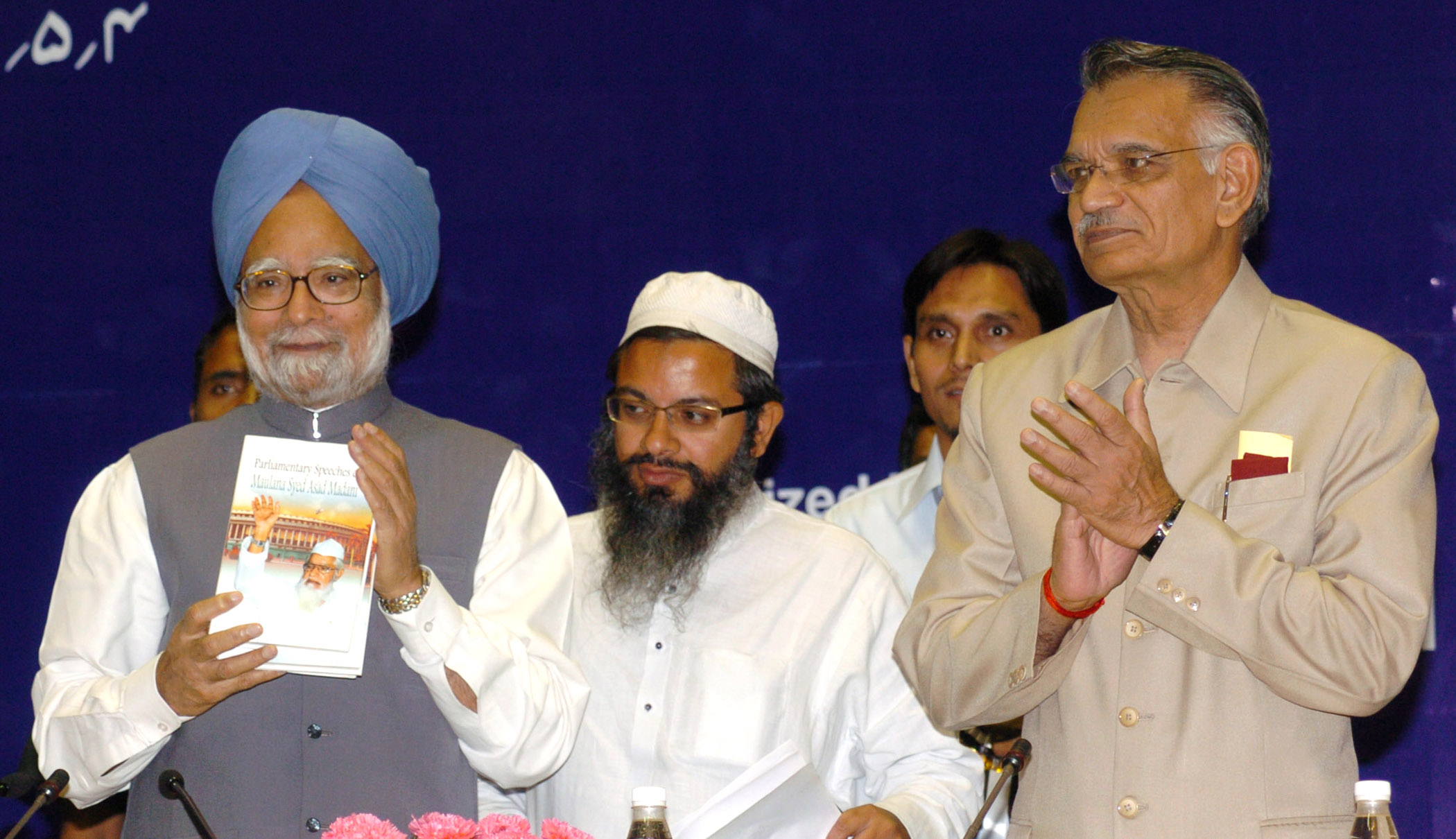
Manmohan Singh, former Prime Minister of India, releasing a collection of the parliamentary speeches of Asad Madni, former President of the Jamiat Ulema-e-Hind, on 23 April 2007.

Jamiat Ulema-e-Hind also has a publications division through which it has published books such as Islam mai Imamat awr Imarat ka Tasawwur (The Concept of Leadership and Emirate in Islam), Hindustan aur Masla-e-Imarat (India and the Issue of Emirate) and Islam The Benevolent for all Constructive Programs of Jamiat Ulema-e-Hind.

== Administration ==
Mahmud Hasan Deobandi was the first president of the Jamiat Ulema-e-Hind, appointed after Kifayatullah Dehlawi served as an interim president until November 1920. Dehlawi succeeded Hasan as the second president of the Jamiat and was succeeded by Hussain Ahmad Madani in 1940. Asad Madni served as the fifth president until February 2006 and was succeeded by his brother Arshad Madani on 8 February 2006. The Jamiat split into Arshad and Mahmood faction in March 2008. Mahmood Madani became the interim president of Mahmood faction on 27 May 2021 after the death of its former president Usman Mansoorpuri, and Arshad Madani serves as the president of the Arshad faction. Mahmood Madani was appointed the president of Mahmood faction on 18 September 2021.

Jamiat Ulema-e-Hind has a general secretary; the first was Ahmad Saeed Dehlavi and the last general secretary of the united Jamiat was Mahmood Madani, who later on became the first general secretary of its Mahmood faction. The current general secretary of the Mahmood faction is Hakeemuddin Qasmi. On 15 October 2020, Masoom Saqib Qasmi was appointed the general secretary of the Arshad faction.

During 1920, Muhammad Sadiq Karachivi, a co-founder of the Jamiat Ulema-e-Hind, established a state-unit of the Jamait in Karachi, and remained its president throughout his life. The Jamiat now has state units throughout India. These include Jamiat Ulama Assam, Jamiat Ulama Bihar, Jamiat Ulama Jharkhand, Jamiat Ulama Karnataka, Jamiat Ulama Madhya Pradesh, Jamiat Ulama Maharashtra, Jamiat Ulama Odisha, Jamiat Ulama Rajasthan, Jamiat Ulama Uttar Pradesh, Jamiat Ulama Uttarakhand, Jamiat Ulama Telangana, and Jamiat Ulama West Bengal. Islamic scholar and the founder of All India United Democratic Front, Badruddin Ajmal, is the state-president for the Assam unit.

== See also ==
- All India Muslim Personal Law Board
- Anjuman-i-Ulama-i-Bangala
- Imarat-e-Shariah
