= Sanyal =

Bengali Hindu surname

Origin
- Origin: Bengali Hindu
- Region of origin: Bengal

Sanyal (Bengali: সান্যাল) is a native Bengali surname, commonly found among the Bengali Hindus of the Indian state of West Bengal and in Bangladesh. Sanyal surname mostly belongs to the Barendra clan of Bengali Kulin Brahmin community.

== Notable people ==
- B. C. Sanyal, artist
- Chandan Roy Sanyal, actor
- Gautam Sanyal, secretary to Chief Minister of West Bengal Mamata Banerjee
- Kanu Sanyal, politician
- Meera Sanyal, banker
- Milan K. Sanyal, physicist
- Mithu Sanyal, German writer, essayist, and academic
- Nalinaksha Sanyal, politician, economist and freedom fighter
- Narayan Sanyal, author
- Pahari Sanyal, actor
- Ram Brahma Sanyal, zoologist
- Ritwik Sanyal, classical singer
- Sachindra Nath Sanyal, revolutionary
- Sanjeev Sanyal, economist and author, who has been a member of the Economic Advisory Council to the Prime Minister of India since March 2022
- Satarupa Sanyal, director
- Sugata Sanyal, computer scientist
- Sulekha Sanyal, author and activist
- Sumita Sanyal, actress
- Usha Sanyal, historian
