= Abdul Rehman Katki =

Indian Islamic cleric (born c. 1978)

- Born: Mohammad Abdul Rehman Ali Khan c. 1978; Paschimkachha, Cuttack district, Odisha, India
- Other names: Maulana Abdul Rehman, Abdur Rahman Katki
- Education: Fazilat (Alim degree) from Darul Uloom Deoband
- Occupations: Islamic cleric, madrasa teacher
- Organization(s): Jamia Ashraful Uloom, Bilteruan (Tangi)
- Known for: Arrested in 2015 in connection with alleged AQIS links; convicted under UAPA in the Delhi case (2023), acquitted in the Jharkhand case (2025) and acquitted in the Odisha/Cuttack case (2026)
- Criminal charge: Offences under Unlawful Activities (Prevention) Act
- Criminal status: Convicted in Delhi (2023); acquitted in Jharkhand (2025); acquitted in Odisha (2026)

Abdul Rehman Katki (also known as Maulana Abdul Rehman or Abdur Rahman Katki; born c. 1978) is an Indian Islamic cleric from Odisha. He came to public attention after his arrest in December 2015 in connection with investigations into alleged links with the Al-Qaeda in the Indian Subcontinent (AQIS).

In February 2023, a special court in Delhi convicted Katki and three others under provisions of the Unlawful Activities (Prevention) Act (UAPA) related to conspiracy and recruitment in a case linked to alleged AQIS activities. In separate proceedings, courts in Jharkhand (2025) and Odisha (2026) later acquitted him in cases alleging AQIS links, citing insufficient evidence.

== Biography ==
Abdul Rehman Katki was born in Paschimkachha village under Jagatpur police station in Cuttack district, Odisha, into the family of Mohammad Usman Ali, a retired policeman. He studied at Jamia Ashraful Uloom in Kendrapara between 1990 and 1995 before joining Darul Uloom Deoband in Uttar Pradesh, where he completed the Dars-e-Nizami course (Fazilat) after several years of study. He later established the Jamia Ashraful Uloom at Bilteruan village in Tangi, Cuttack district, where he served as a cleric and teacher.

== Arrest, investigation and charges ==
On 16 December 2015, Katki was arrested from his residence in Paschimkachha by the Delhi Police Special Cell, with assistance from the Odisha Police.

According to reports at the time, Rehman was 37 years old and was being investigated for allegedly acting as a facilitator and recruiter for Al-Qaeda in the Indian subcontinent (AQIS). Police said that electronic devices and his passport were seized during the search.

Police and media reports at the time described Katki as a recruiter for AQIS and alleged that he ran a madrasa near Cuttack with foreign funding and links abroad. According to police statements and subsequent investigative filings, he was alleged to have links with AQIS and to have been involved in recruitment of youths from Odisha and neighbouring states; investigators also examined foreign travel records and certain foreign-origin bank transactions during the probe.

Following the arrest, the Odisha government ordered increased scrutiny of madrasas in the state and inquiries into the source of funding of institutions associated with Katki's activities.

Shortly after the arrest, the district administration closed the unregistered madrasa run by Katki at Tangi near Cuttack and sent 71 students, mostly from Jharkhand, back to their guardians. Police sealed the premises and detained two teachers for questioning, while investigators examined his bank accounts and leased property records.

The arrests were also reported in international media, including Time, which described the detention of suspected members of an alleged Indian al-Qaeda cell following coordinated operations by Delhi and Odisha Police.

Following his arrest, Odisha Police and Jharkhand Police jointly investigated Katki’s connections in Jamshedpur and surrounding areas, examining possible local associates as part of a wider probe into AQIS activities.

A report by Hindustan Times stated that a Delhi Police team brought Katki and Abdul Sami to Jamshedpur in April 2016 for interrogation in connection with a local FIR alleging recruitment and indoctrination of youths in the city.

In early 2016, some investigators and media reports stated that Katki’s interrogation suggested a wider AQIS presence in India; these reports described allegations of recruitment and foreign contacts but did not constitute formal charges on all such allegations in every jurisdiction.

The Odisha Crime Branch filed a chargesheet in December 2016 accusing Katki under provisions of the UAPA and section 121(A) of the Indian Penal Code, alleging conspiracy, recruitment and related activities; police stated that no explosives or weapons were recovered.

In May 2017, the Special Task Force (STF) of the Odisha Crime Branch produced Katki before the Judicial Magistrate First Class in Salipur and stated that a final chargesheet would be filed; the committal hearing was briefly adjourned after defence counsel said a copy of the chargesheet had not been provided.

The STF later submitted a 574-page final chargesheet in June 2017, after which the matter was transferred to the Cuttack District and Sessions Court for trial.

Katki was subsequently transferred from Delhi’s Tihar Jail to Odisha and lodged in Choudwar Circle Jail under orders of the Judicial Magistrate, Salipur. The case was committed to the Cuttack Sessions Court, where proceedings continued under heavy security.

By 2018, he remained in custody at Choudwar Circle Jail and was periodically produced before the District and Sessions Court, Cuttack, though several hearings were adjourned because prosecution witnesses did not appear.

Court records show that charges were framed in 2017 under multiple UAPA provisions and sedition-related counts, and proceedings continued over several years with multiple hearings and witness examinations.

Later court proceedings and subsequent acquittals in connected cases did not substantiate several of the broader allegations made in early media and police reports.

== Community reaction ==
Local residents and madrasa authorities expressed surprise at the allegations and described Katki as a religious teacher. The Jamiat-Ulama-i-Odisha (M) condemned terrorism and urged madrasas to cooperate with the authorities following Katki's arrest. JUIO president Muhammad Jabir Qasmi said the organisation was "deeply hurt and pained" by the allegations, while general secretary Mohammad Ashraf Ali Qasmi stated that innocent members of the community should not be harassed.

Mohammad Farooq Qasmi, principal of Jamia Ashraful Uloom, told investigators that the institution had cooperated with the inquiry and described Katki as a disciplined and academically able former student, while also expressing shock over the allegations.

Additional reports in The Telegraph said residents of Paschimkachha village expressed shock at Katki's arrest. While some villagers criticised him for bringing a "bad name" to the village, his family and colleagues maintained his innocence and described him as a respected religious teacher.

In December 2016, Katki's brother Taher Ali Khan stated that his brother had been arrested on false charges and expressed confidence that he would eventually be cleared of the allegations.

== Delhi proceedings (2015–2023) ==
On 11 February 2023, a special court at the Patiala House Courts Complex convicted Katki and three others under sections 18 and 18B of the UAPA for conspiracy and recruitment; sentence was scheduled for 14 February 2023.

On 14 February 2023, the court sentenced Katki and three co-accused to seven years and five months’ rigorous imprisonment under sections 18 and 18B. The defence counsel stated that the convicts had already spent around seven years and three months in custody and that this period would be counted as part of the sentence.

Following the verdict, Gulzar Azmi, head of the legal aid committee of the Jamiat Ulama-e-Maharashtra (Arshad Madani), which had provided legal assistance to the accused, stated that while convictions were recorded under specific UAPA sections, the allegation of any connection with the Al-Qaeda organisation could not be proved.

== Jamshedpur proceedings (2016–2025) ==
In April 2016, Katki and co-accused Abdul Sami were produced before the Chief Judicial Magistrate in Jamshedpur after being brought from Delhi’s Tihar Jail on transit remand. The court granted Jharkhand Police seven days’ custody for interrogation under the Unlawful Activities (Prevention) Act in connection with the Bistupur police case. According to police statements cited in contemporaneous reports, the interrogation aimed to ascertain possible links with other suspects, including Masood Ahmed, and to determine whether the accused had undergone arms training abroad.

The trial arising from the 2016 FIR at Bistupur police station concluded on 28 February 2025, when the Additional District and Sessions Judge, Jamshedpur, acquitted Katki and two co-accused. The court held that the prosecution had failed to establish any links with Al-Qaeda and found the evidence insufficient under the UAPA.

== Odisha/Cuttack proceedings (2015–2026) ==
The trial in the Odisha case arising from allegations of links with the AQIS continued before the special sessions court at Cuttack for several years. According to defence submissions before the Supreme Court of India in 2026, many prosecution witnesses had turned hostile and the accused had already spent more than ten years in custody.

In April 2026, while hearing Katki's bail petition, the Supreme Court directed the trial court to expedite proceedings and complete the trial within a fixed period. Following the direction, the prosecution concluded examination of witnesses and the sessions court reserved its judgment in May 2026.

On 26 May 2026, the district and sessions court at Cuttack acquitted Katki of all charges, observing that the prosecution had failed to produce sufficient and credible evidence to establish the allegations under the UAPA.

The sessions court observed that no convincing and substantial material had been produced regarding Katki's alleged involvement with AQIS or Indian Mujahideen, association with terrorists, or visit to Pakistan. The court further held that nothing on record showed that he had received or raised funds for terrorist activities. In its order, the court stated that there was "not a single scrap of convincing evidence" to support the allegations against him.

Following his acquittal, Katki told the Odia news outlet Kanak News that he had spent more than a decade in prison and had suffered significant personal loss during that period. He said that he had been unable to be with members of his family, including relatives who died while he was in custody.

== Appeals & procedure ==
In December 2021, the Supreme Court of India directed the Delhi High Court to expedite hearing of Katki's bail plea, noting prolonged pre-trial custody and limited progress in witness examination — a point raised by defence counsel as implicating the right to a speedy trial.

In July 2024, the Supreme Court listed a special leave petition filed by Katki (SLP (Crl) Nos. 8719–8720/2024) challenging proceedings in the Jharkhand case. The matter, titled Md. Abdul Rhman Ali Khan @ Abdul Rehman @ Katki vs. State of Jharkhand, was listed before a bench comprising the Chief Justice, Justice J.B. Pardiwala, and Justice Manoj Misra.

On 4 March 2024, the Jharkhand High Court (DB) dismissed Katki’s appeal against refusal of regular bail, holding that the case diary and confessional statements furnished prima facie material under the UAPA and emphasising that in UAPA matters “jail is the rule and bail the exception.” The appeal was listed before the Division Bench comprising Justice Sujit Narayan Prasad and Justice Arun Kumar Rai, as shown in the High Court’s daily cause list for 4 March 2024.

Between 2023 and 2025, Katki was moved between Tihar Jail in Delhi and Jharkhand facilities for hearings before different courts. His bail pleas and related interlocutory applications were heard in the Jharkhand and Orissa courts at various stages, with proceedings reported by the press.

In November 2025, the Orissa High Court rejected Katki's bail plea in a separate UAPA case registered by Odisha Police, noting the gravity of allegations and their implications for national security. While refusing bail under Section 483 of the Bharatiya Nagarik Suraksha Sanhita (BNSS), the court directed the Cuttack Sessions Court to expedite the trial, observing the prolonged period of custody already undergone by the accused.

In February 2026, the Supreme Court of India issued notice to the Odisha government while hearing Katki's bail petition in the pending Cuttack UAPA case. A bench comprising Justice Surya Kant and Justice N. Kotiswar Singh directed the state to file its response within four weeks. Senior advocate Nitya Ramakrishnan, appearing for Katki, argued that he had spent more than a decade in custody and that the trial in Cuttack had progressed slowly.

== Scholarly mention ==
Academic sources have briefly mentioned Katki's arrest in the context of studies on Deobandi networks and transnational jihadist movements. The book Faith-Based Violence and Deobandi Militancy in Pakistan (2016), published by Springer Nature, referred to him as an Indian cleric allegedly associated with attempts to establish AQIS-linked recruitment networks, based on contemporary security reports and press coverage from 2015.
