= Khwaja M. Shahid =

Vice Chancellor of Maulana Azad National Urdu University
- In office 2015–2015
- Preceded by: Mohammad Miyan
- Succeeded by: Zafar Sareshwala

Khwaja Mohammed Shahid is an Indian career civil servant, academic and administrator who formerly served as Vice Chancellor of Maulana Azad National Urdu University and Registrar of Jamia Millia Islamia University. He was also an eminent visitor to the University Grants Commission.

He also previously served as Joint Secretary to Government of India. He is a 1976 batch Central Secretariat Service officer.

== Early life and education ==
He graduated with Bachelor, Masters and a Doctor of Philosophy from Aligarh Muslim University.

== Career ==
=== Civil service ===
Shahid joined the Central Secretariat Service in 1976 after qualifying through the Civil Services Examination. He served as Joint Secretary in Union Public Service Commission Secretariat.

He was later empanelled and served in the post as Joint Secretary to Government of India. He was appointed as Director of Institute of Secretariat Training and Management by the Ministry of Personnel, Public Grievances and Pensions.

=== Academic ===
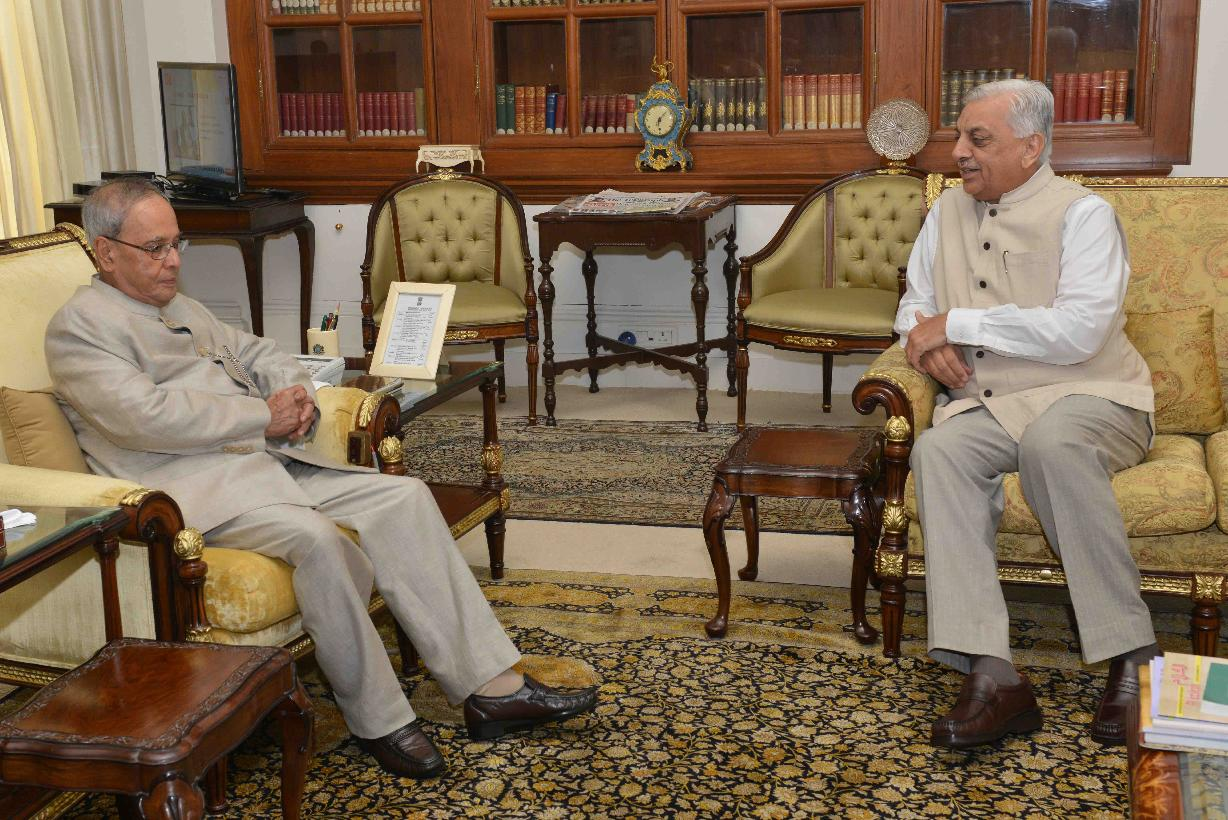
President of India Pranab Mukherjee with Khwaja M. Shahid at Rashtrapati Bhavan in 2015.

He served as registrar of Jamia Millia Islamia University and was responsible for transforming the institution from a "deemed university" status to a full-fledged central university.

He was later appointed as pro-vice chancellor of Maulana Azad National Urdu University by the Ministry of Human Resource Development. He was later appointed as vice chancellor (in charge) of Maulana Azad National Urdu University.

== Books, research papers and journals ==
Shahid is the author of 3 Urdu and 1 English book.

=== Books ===
- Indian Higher Education at a Crossroads (Publisher: Kalpaz Publications; ISBN 9789351281535)

Academic offices
| Preceded by Mohammad Miyan | Vice Chancellor of Maulana Azad National Urdu University; 2015-2015 | Succeeded by Zafar Sareshwala |
| Preceded by | Pro-Vice Chancellor of Maulana Azad National Urdu University; 2013-2015 | Succeeded by |
| Preceded by | Registrar of Jamia Millia Islamia University | Succeeded by |
Government offices
| Preceded by R.K. Saini | Director of Institute of Secretariat Training and Management; 2008-2012 | Succeeded by Umesh Kumar |
Order of precedence
| Unknown | Order of Precedence of India as Joint Secretary to Government of India; 2008 to 2012 | Unknown |
