= D. B. Singh =

Indian politician

Dinesh Singh
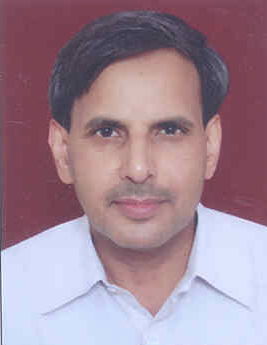

Secretary of Rajya Sabha Secretariat
- In office 2015–2017
- Secretary General: Shumsher K Sheriff
- Vice President of India: Mohammad Hamid Ansari

Personal details
- Born: 23 June 1954 (age 72)
- Education: IIT Kanpur; Faculty of Law, University of Delhi

Dinesh Bahadur Singh is a career India civil servant, mathematician and a scholar who formerly served as Secretary of Rajya Sabha and Rajya Sabha Secretariat, Parliament of India, i.e. the Upper House in the Indian Parliament (similar to the House of Lords but different as most Rajya Sabha members are elected by people's representatives, unlike most of the members of the House of Lords who have peerages bestowed upon them).

He was appointed as Advisor in Rajya Sabha in 2014 and previously served as Additional Secretary and Joint Secretary in Rajya Sabha.

He is a 1981 batch Central Secretariat Service officer.

== Early life and education ==
D.B. Singh has degrees in Bachelor of Science, Master of Science and Doctor of Philosophy in Mathematics from Indian Institute of Technology Kanpur. He also has a Bachelor of Laws from Faculty of Law, University of Delhi and a Master of Business Administration from the United Kingdom.

== Career ==
Singh joined the Central Secretariat Service in 1981 after qualifying through the Civil Services Examination. He has undergone professional trainings in prestigious institutes of USA, UK, Japan, Spain and Thailand. He has led delegation of officers of Rajya Sabha to US Congress, Australian Parliament and South African Parliament. He has also led Indian delegation for negotiation of bi-lateral investment and promotion treaties to various countries.

He has previously served as Joint Secretary of Rajya Sabha and has also worked in Department of Economic Affairs, Constitution Review Commission and Ministry of Law and Justice. He also served as Officer on Special Duty to Suresh Pachouri, then Minister of State in the Ministry of Personnel, Public Grievances and Pensions.

== Recognition ==
He is the first non Indian Administrative Service officer and the first retired civil servant to hold the position of Secretary in Rajya Sabha.

Order of precedence
Preceded by N.C. Joshi	Order of Precedence of India as Secretary of Rajya Sabha; 2015 - 2017	Succeeded by P.P.K. Ramacharyulu
