= Central Secretariat Service =

Administrative civil service of the Indian executive branch

Service overview
Abbreviation	CSS
Formerly known as	ISS
Formed	1 October 1946; 80 years ago
Country	India
Training Ground	Institute of Secretariat Training and Management, New Delhi
Cadre controlling authority	Ministry of Personnel, Public Grievances and Pension, Department of Personnel and Training (CS-I Division)
Legal personality	Governmental: Government service
General nature	Policy Formulation; Civil administration Advisors to Ministers; Continuity of administration in the Cabinet Secretariat
Preceding service	Imperial Secretariat Service (1919–1946)
Cadre Size	11,550 members (2017) (Note: As on year 2021, CSS cadre has a total strength of 12,500 members and is controlled by DOPT, Ministry of Personnel GOI. According to a PTI report published by ThePrint on 7 March 2024, the sanctioned strength of the CSS officers is 13,016.) (Group A - 2471; Group B - 9079)
Selection	UPSC Civil Services Examination (1946–2003); UPSC Limited Departmental Competitive Examination (2003–present)
Association	CSS Group A Officers Association

Head of the Civil Services
- Cabinet Secretary; Current: T.V.Somanathan

Central Secretariat Service (Hindi: केंद्रीय सचिवालय सेवा; abbreviated as CSS) is the administrative civil service under Group A and Group B of the Central Civil Services of the executive branch of the Government of India. They are governed by Central Secretariat Service Rules of 1962, which has been issued under the powers of Article 309 of the Constitution of India. The service members work under restrictions and rules of Central Civil Services (Conduct) Rules.

The service serves as the backbone of administrative work and provides permanent bureaucracy and functionary staff in the Union Government ministries, Cabinet Secretariat, Central Secretariat and other offices of Government of India.

On October 1 every year, the service celebrates CSS day, which marks the anniversary of its establishment.

== History ==
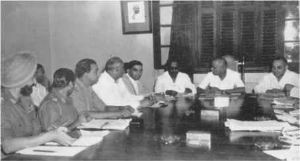
ISS officer V. P. Menon with Rajpramukhs convened by the States Ministry to discuss the future of the Indian States Forces in 1940's.

In the year 1919, the Imperial Secretariat Service came into being as one of the offshoots of the Lewllyn-Smith Committee which had been set up on the eve of the introduction of the Montagu–Chelmsford Reforms. The posts of Assistant Superintendent, Superintendent, Assistant Secretary and Under Secretary were filled by officers drawn from the Imperial Secretariat Service during the British Raj. The recruitment of the members was made by Central Staff Selection Board, which was precursor of the Union Public Service Commission set up in 1926. Notable members included - V. P. Menon and P. V. Gopalan.

In 1946, after India gained independence from Britain, the Imperial Secretariat Service was replaced by Central Secretariat Service in India. However, in Pakistan, a Central Secretariat Service was formed in Central Superior Services of Pakistan, which was later replaced and renamed to Office Management Group (OMG) and Secretariat Group (SG).

The Central Secretariat Service was formed in 1946 and was established before the creation of All India Services - Indian Administrative Service in 1950, Indian Forest Service in 1966 and Indian Police Service in 1948. CSS is one of the earliest organized services in India.

== Recruitment ==
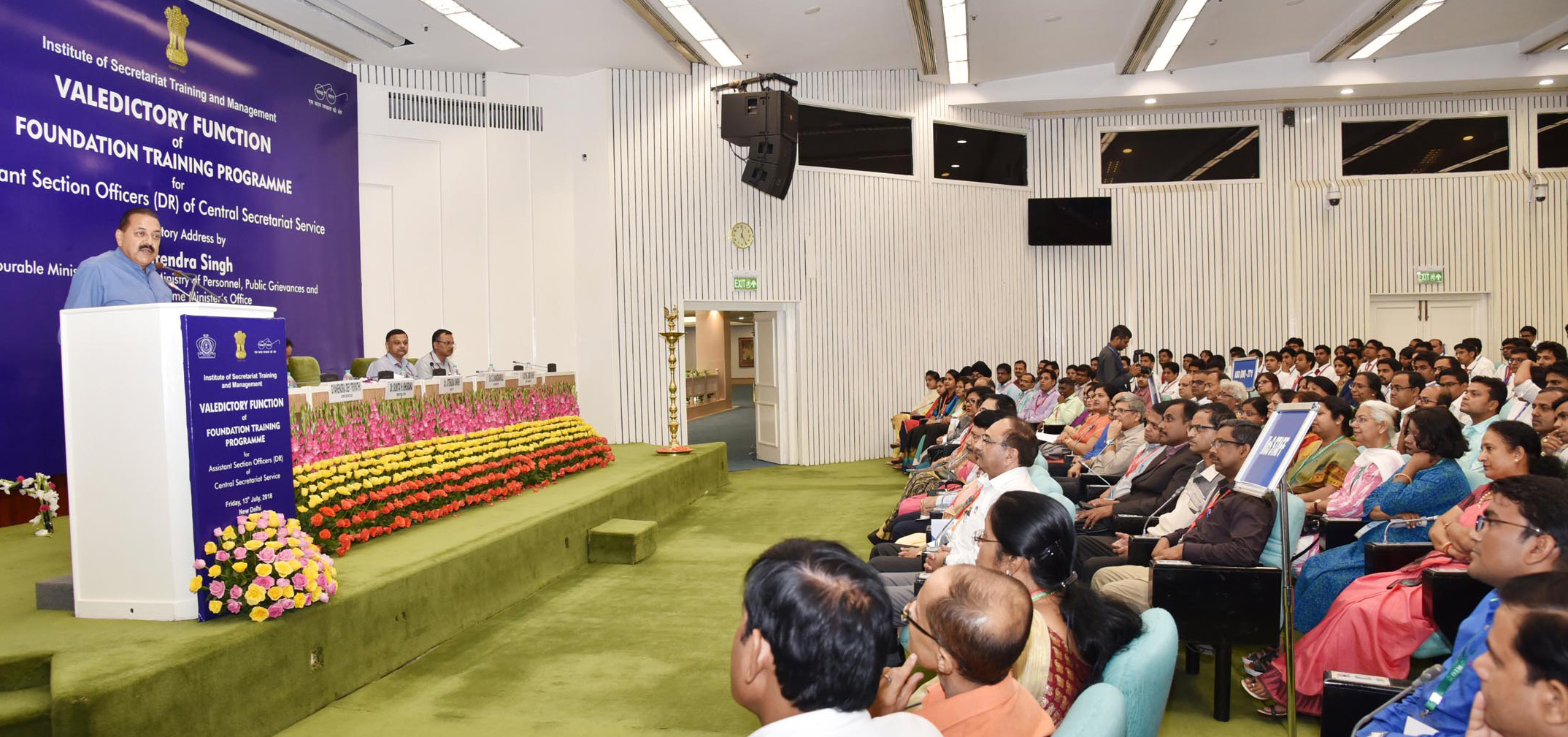
Minister of State at Ministry of Personnel, Public Grievances and Pensions Jitendra Singh interacting with CSS officers in 2018.

From 1946 until 2003, 50 percent of direct recruitment into CSS was through the Civil Services Examination conducted by the Union Public Service Commission, the next 25 percent recruitment was through Annual Departmental Examination and next 25 percent by promotion.

However, after the cadre restructuring in 2003, the direct recruitment into CSS through the Civil Services Examination has been stopped.

The mode of recruitment was changed to the grade of Section Officer by way of 50% through Limited Departmental Competitive Examination by Union Public Service Commission and 50% by seniority.

=== Cadre Strength ===
In July 1950, the authorised permanent strength of Grade I of the CSS cadre was only 180. In May 1967, the authorised permanent strength of Grade I of the CSS cadre was 390. As on 2024, the total sanctioned strength of the CSS is 13,016 (including Group A and Group B).

=== Mandatory Training Program ===
In addition to these, the Government has also introduced mandatory training programs at every level of promotion. The CSS officers are trained both in India and abroad in various institutions starting at Level E onwards.

== Allocation and placement ==
After appointment by the President of India, the officers (Entry grade/Probationers) are allocated to different Ministries/Departments under Government of India. The Group B officers work in the levels of Assistant Section Officer and Section Officer/Assistant Director (For Directorate). The Group A officers work in the levels of Under Secretary/Deputy Director (For Directorate), Deputy Secretary/Joint Director (For Directorate), Director, Joint Secretary and Additional Secretary under Central Staffing Scheme of Government of India.

The officers are posted in various Ministries and Departments, Prime Minister's Office, National Security Council Secretariat, intelligence agencies, Apex /Autonomous organizations of Government of India located at different places in the Secretariat in New Delhi. They are also appointed in personal staff of Union Council of Ministers of India.

=== Deputations ===
The officers are also posted outside Delhi, or at various places of the country in other offices upon deputation. They can also be deputed for service under an international organization, an autonomous body not controlled by the Government, or a private body as same as under Rule 6 (2)(ii) of IAS (Cadre) Rules.

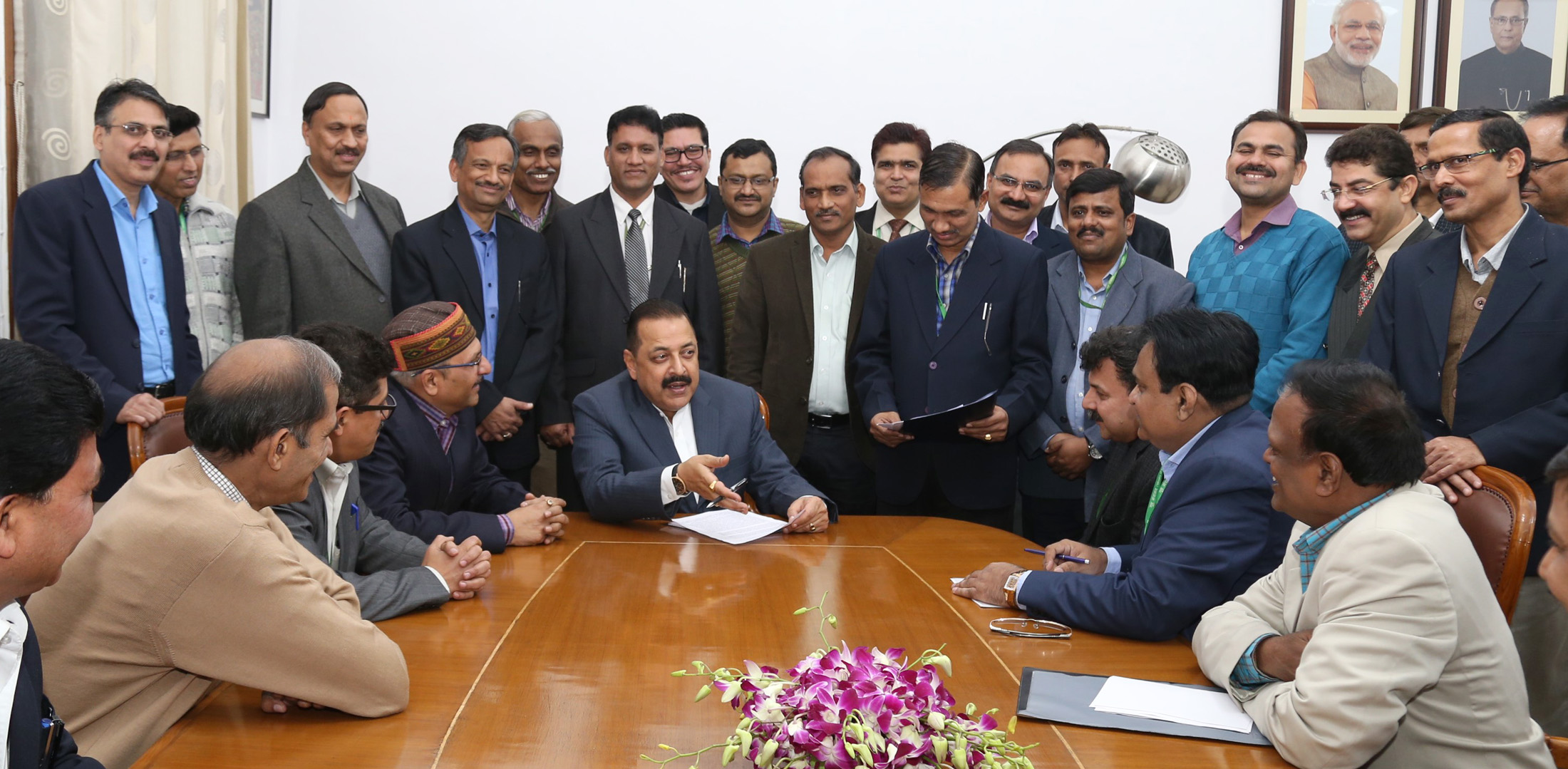
Minister of State at Ministry of Personnel, Public Grievances and Pensions Jitendra Singh interacting with CSS Forum in 2016.

In 2014, Government of India offered cadre officers on deputation to State governments of India like West Bengal and Uttarakhand. In 2016, Government of India has approved officers to be posted on non-cadre posts in the secretariat of Northeastern states of India.

=== Rotational transfer policy ===
The service follows RTP policy which stipulates fixed tenure in a Ministry/Department at different grades of the service in their career. The policy aims at the overall growth of officers, their exposure to different Ministries/Departments and various aspects of working of the Government of India. The Central Vigilance Commission also recommends rotational transfers as a preventive vigilance mechanism to curb corruption by limiting the development of vested interests.

The officers serving in Prime Minister's Office, Cabinet Secretariat, offices of - Solicitor General, Attorney General and Additional Solicitor General are exempted under RTP.

The Department of Personnel and Training (DoPT) revised the Rotational Transfer Policy (RTP) for Central Secretariat Service (CSS) officers on May 8, 2026. It divides all central ministries and departments into four new functional sector groups to ensure transparent transfers, balanced career growth, and diverse administrative experience.

New Sector Groups (2026)
Serial No.	Group	Sector	Sector Description
1	Group A	Rural Development & Social Sector	Covers agriculture, cooperation, culture, health, education, fisheries, minority affairs, and panchayati raj.
2	Group B	Economy, Finance & Industries	Covers commerce, corporate affairs, chemicals, and finance-linked departments like DIPAM.
3	Group C	Infrastructure, Resources & Technology	Covers civil aviation, coal, bio-technology, earth sciences, and technical resource departments.
4	Group D	Governance & Security	Covers administrative reforms, the Cabinet Secretariat, CBI, and the CVC.

== Responsibilities and functions ==
The typical functions performed by an CSS officer are:

- Formulation and Monitoring of Policies - The officers play a critical role in assisting policy formulation and monitoring its implementation across various ministries and departments. They convert broad directives into actionable administrative tasks.
- Administrative Continuity and Secretariat Maintenance - They ensure the smooth running of day-to-day Secretariat operations (commonly termed “Secretariat administration and housekeeping”), providing institutional memory and continuity within the machinery of governance.
- Noting, Drafting, and Regulatory Interpretation - The officers have strong skills in official noting, drafting documents, and interpreting existing rules and regulations—tasks fundamental to effective government administration.
- Analysis and Policy Development - They analyze reports from commissions/committees, expert opinions, and inputs from various sources to produce balanced, informed notes that feed into policy development.
- Parliamentary Liaison & Documentation - They act as a vital link between Parliament and the Secretariat, handling parliamentary questions, government bills, assurances, and other legislative support work.
- Financial Management and Budget Oversight - They assist in preparing departmental budgets and managing financial aspects of centrally funded schemes—especially those executed by states or other agencies.
- Litigation Handling - They are often entrusted with matters related to litigation, ensuring that the government's legal interests are protected in administrative and policy disputes.
- Institutional Memory & Transition Support - The officers bridge the gap between past and present, senior leadership and junior staff, helping maintain administrative coherence and learning.

== Designations and Pay grade ==
	Position / Pay Grade in the Government of India	Level and Rank in the Central Government (Note: CSS officers serve in ranks/posts of the Government of India under Central Staffing Scheme.)	Order of Precedence (As per Presidential order)	Equivalent Position or Designation in the Directorate	Equivalent Position or Designation in the State Government(s)
1	Super Time Scale (HAG) (Pay level 15) ₹182,200 (US$1,900)—₹224,100 (US$2,300)	Additional Secretary to Government of India	25	-	Principal Secretary/Divisional Commissioner
2	Super Time Scale (SAG) (Pay level 14) ₹144,200 (US$1,500)—₹218,200 (US$2,300)	Joint Secretary to Government of India	26	-	Secretary/Divisional Commissioner
3	Selection Grade (Pay level 13) ₹123,100 (US$1,300)—₹215,900 (US$2,200)	Director	-	-	Additional Secretary /Deputy Commissioner/Special Secretary
4	Junior Administrative Grade (JAG) (Pay level 12) ₹78,800 (US$820)—₹208,700 (US$2,200)	Deputy Secretary	-	Joint Director	Joint Secretary/District Magistrate/Collector
5	Senior Time Scale (Pay level 11) ₹67,700 (US$700)—₹208,700 (US$2,200)	Under Secretary (Note: Under Secretary is a Group A Gazetted Officer post. The majority of Under Secretary-level officers in the Government of India are from the CSS cadre.)	-	Deputy Director	Deputy Secretary/Additional District Magistrate/Additional Collector
6	Junior Time Scale (NFSG) (Pay level 10) ₹56,100 (US$580)—₹177,500 (US$1,800)	Assistant Secretary / Section Officer	-	Assistant Director	Under Secretary/Sub-Divisional Magistrate
7	Junior Time Scale (Pay level 8) ₹47,600 (US$490)—₹151,100 (US$1,600)	Assistant Secretary / Section Officer (Note: The appointing authority of a Section Officer in the CSS cadre is the President of India. Thus the President is the only authority competent to dismiss or remove the section officer.)	-	-	Section Officer
8	Entry Grade (Pay level 7) ₹44,900 (US$470)—₹142,400 (US$1,500)	Assistant Section Officer (Note: An Assistant Section Officer (ASO) in the CSS is a Group B (Non-Gazetted) position within the Government of India. This is an entry-level (probationer) or promoted from the post of UDC.)	-	-	Review Officer in State Secretariat

== Reforms ==
=== 1st Cadre Restructure of 2003 ===
In 2003, a committee was formed under the leadership of Additional Secretary (GOI). The direct induction of CSS officer through Civil Services Examination was permanently stopped. Also a new level G training program was organised for those in line of promotion in the rank of Joint Secretary (GOI) in the SAG level.

=== 2nd Cadre Restructure of 2010 ===
The Government had set up a Committee on Cadre Restructuring of Central Secretariat Service (CSS) in June 2008. The Committee submitted its report in November 2008 for further reforms in the service. The report was finally accepted in 2010 and the number of posts at various levels including Deputy Secretaries and Directors were increased following the review

=== 3rd Cadre Restructure of 2013 ===
A committee was formed under the leadership of Additional Secretary (GOI) in 2013 for further reforms in the service. The report is currently pending with Prime Minister's Office and is expected to improve the service conditions by increasing the number of posts at the level of Deputy Secretaries.

== Controversies ==
Recently, some CSS officers have been in the list of corrupt bureaucrats and have come under the CBI scanner for alleged involvement in a few corruption cases. In 2019, Ministry of Personnel, Public Grievances and Pensions (DOPT) listed 284 officers for performance audit by review panel headed by Cabinet Secretary of India.

In 2019, a group of CSS officers approached the Supreme Court alleging that the Government of India had violated its April 15, 2019 order, which directed maintenance of a status quo on promotions. Despite this injunction, the Department of Personnel and Training (DoPT) issued ad hoc promotions in December 2020—reportedly affecting 149 officers—and again in early 2021, prompting the petitioners to seek contempt action. The Supreme Court bench comprising Chief Justice Uday Lalit and Justice Shripathi Bhat took a serious view of the matter and in April 2021 (as noted in multiple reports) issued contempt notice to Home Secretary Ajay Bhalla, after prima facie finding non‑compliance with its 2019 directive. However, in September 2022, the contempt proceedings were closed after the government complied with the Court's orders by issuing pending promotions and addressing the cadre restructuring of CSS officers.

== Model and influence ==
=== State government of India ===
Based on CSS service model, 28 state governments in India have their own independent secretariat service, usually known as the State Secretariat Service, which functions similarly to the CSS of the Government of India. The examples are like Bihar, Uttar Pradesh who have organised their own independent services like Bihar Secretariat Service and Provincial Secretariat Service (UP).

=== Central Government ===
The Union Government ministries such like Railways, Defence and External Affairs, have organised their own independent services based on CSS model which are known as Railway Board Secretariat Service, Armed Forces Headquarters Civil Services and Indian Foreign Service, Group B (general cadre) respectively.

The Railway Board Secretariat Service, the general administration staff in the Ministry of Railways, is modelled after the Central Secretariat Service.

== Notable members ==
Since its inception, CSS has produced many outstanding civil servants in India, including recipients of Padma Shri (2) and Padma Bhushan (1).

Influential members include - M.P. Singh who was appointed as Vice-Chairman of Central Administrative Tribunal at Jabalpur Bench, P.G. Lele who served as Additional Secretary to Government of India in the Ministry of Finance and M.V. Ayyar who was empanelled as Secretary to Government of India.

Reportedly, in the 1960s, there have been Labour Secretary and Education Secretary in Government of India also from CSS.

=== List ===
- N. R. Madhava Menon - Awarded Padma Shri (2003) and Padma Bhushan (2020) by Government of India and founder director of National Law School of India University
- Ramaswamy Venkata Subra Mani - Awarded Padma Shri (2026) by Government of India
- Anwar Jamal Kidwai - 6th Vice Chancellor of Jamia Millia Islamia University and Secretary to Government of India in Ministry of Information and Broadcasting
- Khwaja M. Shahid - Vice Chancellor of Maulana Azad National Urdu University
- Hari Sharma
- Arun Kumar
- D.B. Singh
- Gautam Sanyal
- U. Sagayam (1989)

== See also ==
- Civil Services of India

== Books ==
- Singh, Hoshiar (2011) Indian Administration. Pearson Education India ISBN 9788131761199.
- Jayapalan, N. (2001) Indian Administration 2 Vols. Set. Atlantic Publishers & Distri ISBN 9788171569212.
- Maheshwari, S.R. (2006) Public Administration in India: The Higher Civil Service. Oxford University Press ISBN 9780199087839.
