= Arun Kumar =

Arun Kumar may refer to:

- Arun Kumar (administrator) (born 1953), Indian civil servant
- Arun Kumar (Bihar politician) (born 1959), former member of the Indian Parliament
- Arun Kumar (bowls) (born 1961), Indian-Fijian international lawn bowler
- Arun Kumar (Himachal Pradesh politician) (born 1961), Indian politician
- Arun Kumar (Uttar Pradesh politician) (born 1948), Indian physician and member of Uttar Pradesh Legislative Assembly
- Arun M. Kumar (born 1952), former chairman and CEO of KPMG in India
- Arun Kumar Aravind (born 1977), Indian film director, editor and producer
- Arun Vijay (born 1974), previously credited as Arun Kumar, an Indian actor
- Uttam Kumar (1926–1980), birth name Arun Kumar Chatterjee
- Stage name of Gururajulu Naidu (1931–1985), Indian musician
- Atlee (director), (born 1986) Indian filmmaker, real name Arun Kumar

== See also ==
- Arunkumar, alternative spelling of the Indian male given name
- Thangjam Arunkumar, Indian politician from Manipur
