= Jamia Ashraful Uloom =

Islamic educational institution in Odisha

Coordinates: 20.4975°N 86.4154°E

- جامعہ اشرف العلوم
- Type: Islamic seminary (madrasa)
- Established: 1937 (reopened 1984)
- Affiliations: Odisha State Board of Madarsa Education
- Principal: Muhammad Farooq Qasmi
- Location: Kendrapara, Odisha, India
- Language: Urdu, Arabic, Odia, English

Jamia Ashraful Uloom (Urdu: جامعہ اشرف العلوم), formerly known as Madrasa Ashraful Uloom Hanafiya, is an Islamic educational institution located in Mahmoodabad, Kendrapara district, in the Indian state of Odisha. It is a residential madrasa offering a combination of religious and modern general education. The institution is registered under the Societies Registration Act XXI of 1860 and is affiliated with the Odisha State Board of Madarsa Education. The current principal of the institution is Muhammad Farooq Qasmi.

== History ==
The madrasa was initially founded in 1937 as a center for Quran memorization. It was closed for several years and later reopened in 1984. It was officially registered as a full-fledged Islamic residential college on 22 December 1986.

== Academics and curriculum ==
Jamia Ashraful Uloom is one of 167 registered madrasas under the Odisha State Board of Madarsa Education (OSBME). It offers both theological and general education subjects, including:

- Theological: Quranic studies, Fiqh (Islamic jurisprudence), Arabic, Urdu
- General: Odia, English, Mathematics, Science, and History

The institution is recognized for equivalence by Maulana Azad National Urdu University (MANUU) for the following programs:

- Alim (B.A.), including B.A. (Hons-JMC)
- Fazil (M.A.) in Arabic, Urdu, Persian, Islamic Studies, History, Political Science, Sociology, Economics, Public Administration, Women Education, and Translation Studies

It is also recognized by Dr. Abdul Haq Urdu University (AHUU) for both regular and distance mode admissions. Approved programs under the Alim level include:

- Regular mode: B.A., B.A. (Hons-JMC)
- Distance mode: B.A., Diploma in Journalism and Mass Communication (JMC)

The Odisha Madrasa Board conducts the following examinations:

- Wastania (Class VII)
- Moulvi (Class X)
- Mahir (Plus Two)
- Alim (B.A. level)
- Fazil-e-Hadith (Postgraduate in theology)
- Fazil-e-Urdu (Postgraduate in Urdu)

Additionally, the institution holds academic equivalency affiliations with Jamia Millia Islamia and Aligarh Muslim University (AMU), facilitating graduates’ access to higher and professional education in mainstream universities.

== Community Role ==
The institution is considered important for the educational advancement of underprivileged sections of the Muslim community. According to a 2015 study, madrasa education in Odisha provides an accessible alternative to private schooling, especially for economically weaker families.

Students are reported to have transitioned successfully to mainstream education systems and achieved respectable positions in society.

== Events ==
The madrasa hosts Quranic recitation competitions and religious seminars, some of which involve over 100 affiliated maktabs and madrasas. The institution was previously guided by religious scholars such as the late Ghulam Mohammad Vastanvi.

== See also ==
- Jamia Islamia Markazul Uloom
