= Muhammad Jabir Qasmi =

Indian Islamic scholar, Sufi sheikh and Muslim leader

Mawlana Muhammad Jabir Qasmi
- محمد جابر قاسمی

1st President of Jamiat Ulama-e-Odisha (M)
- In office 2008 – 17 November 2020
- Preceded by: "office established"
- Succeeded by: Muhammad Ghufran Qasmi

President of United Jamiat Ulama-e-Orissa
- In office February 2008 – March 2008
- Preceded by: S. S. Sajideen Qasmi
- Succeeded by: "office bifurcated": Himself, as the president of Jamiat Ulama-e-Odisha (M); Muhammad Jalal Qasmi, as the president of Jamiat Ulama-e-Odisha (A)

President, Odisha State Unit of Kul-Hind Rabta-e-Madāris-e-Arabia, Darul Uloom Deoband
- In office December 2006 – 17 November 2020
- Preceded by: S. S. Sajideen Qasmi
- Succeeded by: Muhammad Farooq Qasmi

Personal life
- Born: 1943 Binjharpur, Jajpur district, Orissa (Odisha), India
- Died: 17 November 2020 (aged 76–77) Binjharpur, Jajpur district, Odisha, India
- Education: Mazahir Uloom Saharanpur; Darul Uloom Deoband
- Occupation: Islamic scholar, Sufi shaykh, muslim leader

Religious life
- Religion: Islam
- Denomination: Sunni
- Jurisprudence: Hanafi
- Tariqa: Chishtiya-Sabiriya-Imdadiya
- Creed: Maturidi
- Movement: Deobandi

Muslim leader
- Teacher: Zakariyya Kandhlawi; Syed Fakhruddin Ahmad; Wahiduzzaman Kairanawi
- Disciple of: Asad Madani

Muhammad Jabir Qasmi (1943–17 November 2020) was an Indian Islamic scholar, Sufi sheikh, and Muslim leader. He was the first president of Jamiat Ulama-e-Odisha (M) and a member of the working committee of Jamiat Ulama-e-Hind (M).

== Early life and education ==
Muhammad Jabir Qasmi was born in 1943 in Binjharpur, Jajpur district, Orissa.

He received his primary education from Maulana Irfan in his village, memorized only ten verses of the Quran due to his ill health, then traveled to Mazahir Uloom Saharanpur for higher education and stayed there to study up to the fifth grade of Arabic. At the Saharanpur seminary, his teachers included Zakariyya Kandhlawi and Yahya Saharanpuri, the father of Salman Mazahiri.

Following Saharanpur, he moved to Deoband, enrolled in Darul Uloom Deoband, and graduated from there in 1966 (1366 AH). He studied Sahih al-Bukhari with Syed Fakhruddin Ahmad at Darul Uloom Deoband.

== Career ==
After graduation, Qasmi started his teaching career at a madrasa in Begusarai, Bihar, and served there for five years. After that, on the insistence of Amanullah Binjharpuri and Abdul Ghaffar Binjharpuri, he served as the teacher at the Senior Madrasa in Binjharpur, Jajpur district, and taught Sahih Muslim there for years. He also served as a teacher at Madrasa Mishkat-ul-Uloom, Binjharpur.

He was a lifelong member of the Jamiat Ulama-e-Hind, having served it both before and after its split. In the year 2008, he was elected as the president of the Jamiat Ulama-e-Odisha, and then, after the split of the Jamiat Ulama-e-Hind on 6 March 2008, he was elected as the president of the Jamiat Ulama-e-Odisha (M) and continued to serve for it till his lifetime. He also served as Ameer Shariat of Odisha Province; however, his emirate was confirmed by Osman Mansoor Puri at the beginning of his emirate period, i.e., 2010. Apart from this, he was a member of the working committee of the Jamiat Ulema-e-Hind (M) and was also its special invitee for life. Being associated with the Jamiat, he performed social and welfare services in Odisha. He was also active during the 1999 Odisha Cyclone. He also organized a meeting on the occasion of an anti-terrorism conference organized by Jamiat Ulema-e-Hind (M) in Bhubaneswar, the capital of Odisha, in which Odisha Chief Minister Naveen Patnaik was also invited as a special guest.

He was an authorised disciple of Asad Madani in Sufism, and for this reason, he also established a khanqah (Islamic monastery) in Binjharpur for the reform and education of the nation. Apart from this, their khanqahs were also established in other areas.

In the working committee meeting of the All-India Association of Islamic and Arabic Seminaries, Darul Uloom Deoband [held: 4 December 2006, 12 Dhu Qa'da 1427 AH], after Sirajussajidin Katki, he was appointed as President of its provincial branch and elected its working committee member.

== Death ==
Qasmi died on 17 November 2020 (1st Rabi al-Thani 1442 AH) on Tuesday after a long illness. The funeral prayer was led by his son Arshad Zaki Qasmi in Binjharpur the same day after the Isha prayer, and he was buried there in Binjharpur. Usman Mansoorpuri and Mahmood Madani delivered their condolences on his demise and stated that it was a loss to the Jamiat.

== See also ==
- Muhammad Ismail Katki
- Sirajussajidin Katki
- Kafeel Ahmad Qasmi
