= Shah Alam Gorakhpuri =

Indian Islamic scholar and author (b. 1969)

- شاہ عالم گورکھپوری
- Born: Shah Alam; 21 March 1969 (age 57); Baldiha, Gorakhpur district (now part of Maharajganj district), Uttar Pradesh, India
- Education: Jamia Arabia Masoodia Noorul Uloom; Darul Uloom Deoband; (Dars-e-Nizami); Maulana Azad National Urdu University (M.A.); Chaudhary Charan Singh University (Ph.D.)
- Occupations: Islamic scholar, author, teacher
- Known for: Deputy Secretary, All India Majlis-e-Tahaffuz-e-Khatm-e-Nubuwwat
- Notable work: Tafaseer Quran aur Mirzai Shubhat, Mirzaiyat aur Adalati Faislay, Fitna Qadianiyat aur Islami Istilahaat
- Awards: Uttar Pradesh Urdu Academy commendation (2014)

Shah Alam Gorakhpuri (born 21 March 1969) is an Indian Islamic scholar and Deputy Secretary of the All India Majlis-e-Tahaffuz-e-Khatm-e-Nubuwwat, dedicated to safeguarding the doctrine of Khatm-e-Nubuwwat (Finality of Prophethood).

== Early life and education ==
Shah Alam Gorakhpuri was born on 21 March 1969, in Baldiha village, Gorakhpur district (now Maharajganj district). He began his education under his uncle at Madrasa Noor-ul-Islam. He later attended Anglo-English School, Ghughali, and pursued Islamic studies at institutions like Jamia Arabia Masoodia Noorul Uloom, Bahraich.

In 1986, he joined Darul Uloom Deoband and completed Dars-e-Nizami in 1989 under the guidance of renowned scholars such as Naseer Ahmad Khan, Mahmood Hasan Gangohi, Abdul Haq Azmi, Qamruddin Ahmad Gorakhpuri, Nematullah Azami, Saeed Ahmad Palanpuri, Usman Mansoorpuri, and Abdul Khaliq Madrasi. He specialized in Khatm-e-Nubuwwat in 1989–1990, benefiting from prominent mentors, including Muhammad Ismail Katki and Manzoor Ahmad Chinioti.

== Career ==
In 1991, Gorakhpuri began as a preacher at Darul Uloom Deoband and later rejoined as a teacher in 1996, serving in the Department of Khatm-e-Nubuwwat. He also serves as Deputy Secretary of the All India Majlis-e-Tahaffuz-e-Khatm-e-Nubuwwat, playing a vital role in teaching, writing, and promoting this doctrine globally.

Gorakhpuri earned an M.A. from Maulana Azad National Urdu University, Hyderabad, and a Ph.D. from Chaudhary Charan Singh University, Meerut, in 2010. Under Aslam Jamshedpuri's supervision, he wrote a thesis on the role of lesser-known scholars in promoting Urdu literature (1850–1900), later published by Educational Publishing House, Delhi. This work earned him a commendation from the Uttar Pradesh Urdu Academy in 2014.

== Literary works ==
Gorakhpuri researched, annotated, edited, and published over two hundred books on the topic of the Protection of Finality of Prophethood. His notable books include:

- Tafaseer Quran aur Mirzai Shubhat (transl. Exegesis of the Quran and Mirzai Objections)
- Mirzaiyat aur Adalati Faislay (transl. Mirzaiyat and Judicial Decisions)
- Fitna Qadianiyat aur Islami Istilahaat (transl. The Fitna of Qadianism and Islamic Terminology)
- Shakeel bin Hanif: Ek Taaruf wa Tajziyah (transl. Shakeel bin Hanif: An Introduction and Analysis)
- Urdu Zaban o Adab ki Tareeje o Isha'at mein Chand Gumnaam Ulama ka Mukhlisana Kirdar - 1850 se 1900 (transl. The Sincere Role of Some Unknown Scholars in the Promotion and Dissemination of Urdu Language and Literature - 1850 to 1900)

In 2006, he established Markaz al-Turath al-Islami al-Ilmi in Deoband, a center dedicated to research, editing, and publishing classical Islamic texts. His book, Islami Aqaa'id o Maloomat (transl. Islamic Beliefs and Information), has been translated into eight languages, including Urdu, Hindi, English, Arabic, Malayalam, Gujarati, and Telugu. It is included in the curriculum of various schools and madrassas.

== See also ==
- List of Deobandis
