= Sugata (disambiguation) =

Sugata is an epithet for Gautama Buddha.

Sugata may also refer to:

== People ==
Name

- Sugata Bose, Indian historian
- Sugata Marjit, Professor of Industrial Economics
- Sugata Mitra, Professor of Educational Technology
- Sugata Sanyal, Professor of Computer Science

Surname

- Isotaro Sugata (須賀田 礒太郎; 1907–1952), Japanese composer
- Masahiro Sugata (菅田 真啓; born 1997), Japanese footballer
- Shun Sugata (菅田 俊; born 1955), Japanese actor
- Yoshikazu Sugata (菅田 順和; born 1953), Japanese former track cyclist

== Films ==
- Sanshiro Sugata (1943) Japanese martial arts drama film
- Sanshiro Sugata Part II (1945) Japanese action drama film

== Other ==
- Sugata Saurabha (epic), (Nepali: सुगत सौरभ) an epic poem in Nepal Bhasa by Chittadhar Hridaya
