= Gautam Sanyal =

Indian civil servant

Personal details
- Born: 14 October 1951 (age 74)

Gautam Sanyal is an Indian career civil servant who formerly served as Principal Secretary to Government of West Bengal from June 2015 to May 2026.

In June 2016, he was re-appointed as Principal Secretary and his tenure co-terminus with that of Chief Minister of West Bengal.

He previously served as Secretary to Chief Minister of West Bengal from 2011 to 2015. He also previously served as Joint Secretary to Government of India. He is a 1976 batch Central Secretariat Service officer.

== Early life and education ==
Sanyal has a Bachelor of Arts in political science from Ashutosh College, a Masters in Sociology from Delhi University in 1997, and later earned a Master of Business Administration from United Kingdom.

== Career ==
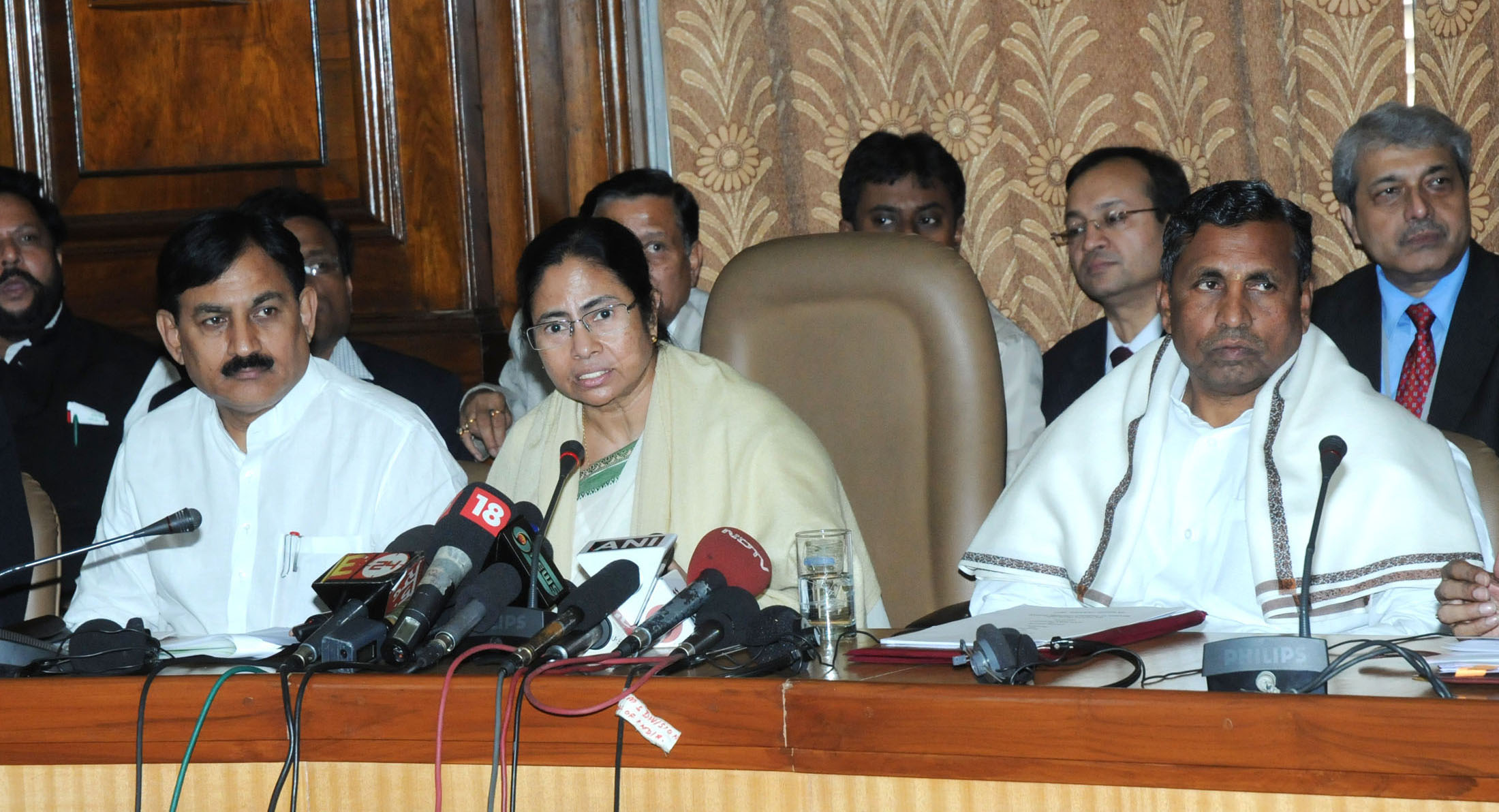
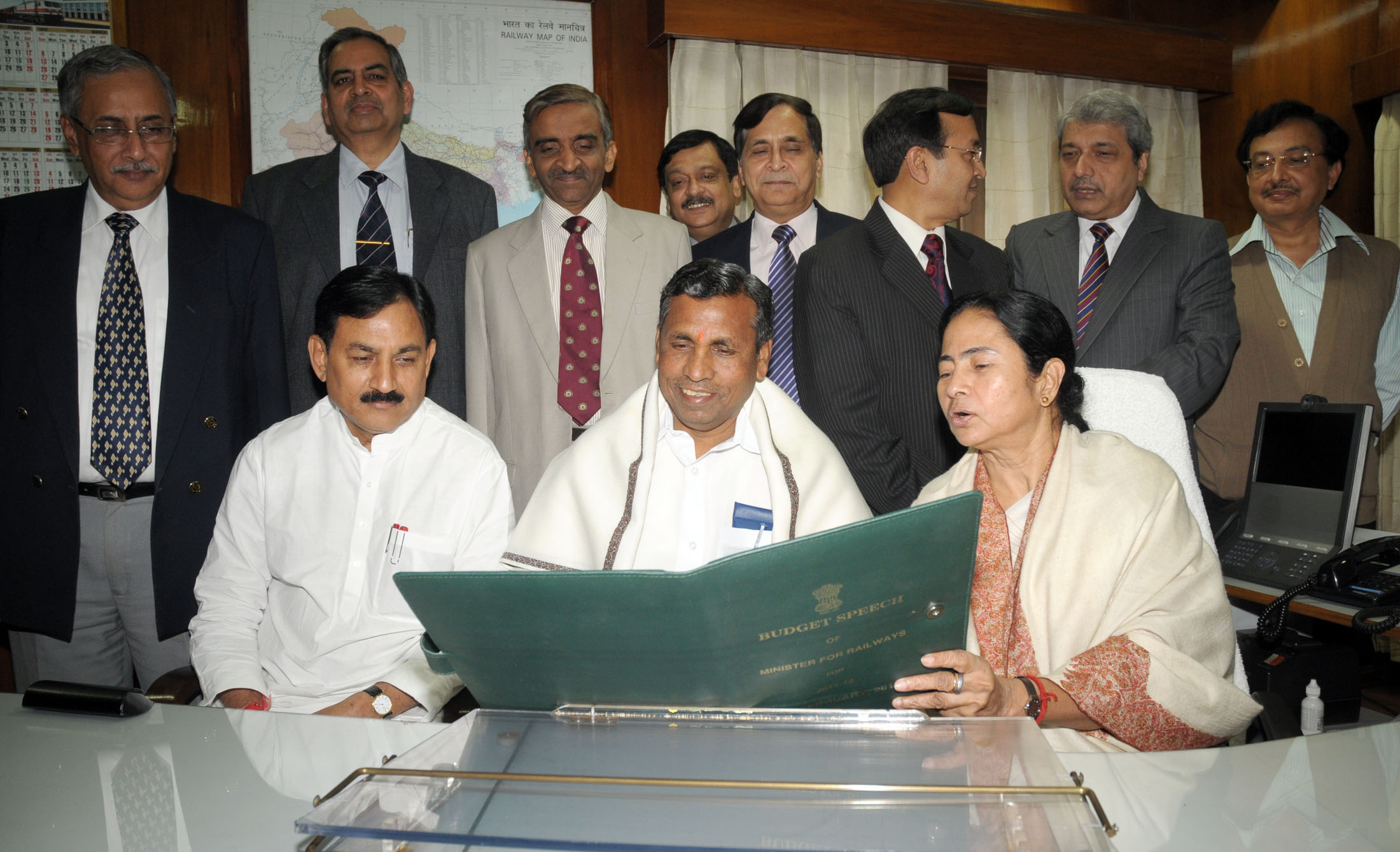
Mamata Banerjee seen here with Chairman and members of Railway Board, Gautam Sanyal (right) and also seen interacting with the media persons after the presentation of Railway Budget 2011-12.

=== West Bengal ===
Sanyal initially joined the West Bengal Subordinate Commercial Tax Service as an Assistant Commercial Tax Officer (Group B) in 1973.

=== Government of India ===
Sanyal joined the Central Secretariat Service in 1976 after qualifying through the Civil Services Examination. He served as Under Secretary to Government of India in the Ministry of Human Resource Development in 1990 and later as Deputy Secretary to Government of India in the Ministry of Railways in 1998.

He was later empanelled as Joint Secretary to Government of India in June 2009 by the Appointments Committee of the Cabinet and served in the Ministry of Food Processing Industries. He was also the board member of the Food Safety and Standards Authority of India.

He later served as Officer on Special Duty to Union Cabinet Minister of Railways from 2009 to 2011. He retired in 2011.

After retirement from the Central Government, he was appointed as Secretary to the Chief Minister of West Bengal. His appointment and tenure to the post was made co-terminous with that of the Chief Minister.

== Recognition ==
He is the first non Indian Administrative Service officer in West Bengal and the first retired civil servant to hold the position of Secretary in the Chief Ministers Office. He also became the first non IAS officer in history to hold the position of Principal Secretary in State governments of India.

In 2011, a news blog declared him as the new poster boy of India's civil services. The Indian Express and The Financial Express rate him as top state bureaucrat in India in the article most powerful Indians for the year 2013. Many media articles consider him to the most powerful civil servant in the state in India and the "most important officer" in the Government of West Bengal.

In 2015, Ministry of Personnel, Public Grievances and Pensions (DOPT) of Government of India rejected petition filed by the IAS association against the appointment of Gautam Sanyal as the Principal Secretary. In 2018, India Today listed Sanyal in top 10 hidden corridor power in India.

== Issues ==
In 2013, media articles reported that CBI director Ranjit Sinha had placed Sanyal on his hit-list. In 2019, media reported that Sanyal is in the process of investigation by Enforcement Directorate in connection with the disinvestment of a state government company in West Bengal.

Order of precedence
| Unknown | Order of Precedence of India as Joint Secretary to Government of India; 2009 to 2011 | Incumbent |
