= Kafeel Ahmad Qasmi =

Indian Islamic scholar

Professor, Maulana Sayed Kafeel Ahmad Qasmi
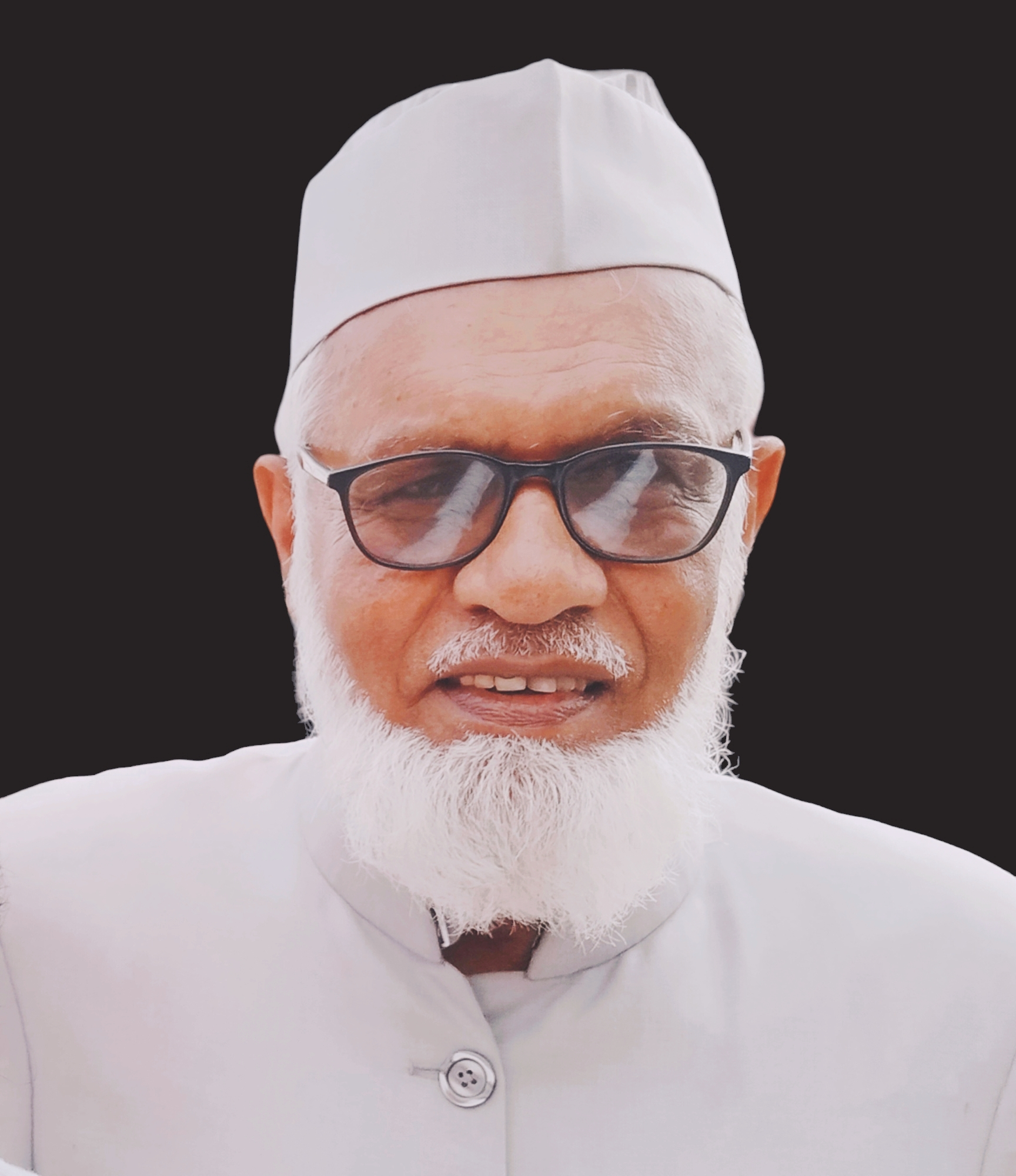
- Sayed Kafeel Ahmad Qasmi
- Born: Sayed Kafeel Ahmad; 25 December 1951 (age 74); Jairampur, Kood, Cuttack district, India
- Citizenship: India
- Education: Aalim; M.A; MPhil; PhD
- Alma mater: Jamia Islamia Markazul Uloom; Darul Uloom Deoband; Jamia Millia Islamia; Aligarh Muslim University
- Occupations: Professor, Author, Translator
- Years active: 1976–present
- Notable work: Al-Maqrizi: Hayātuhu, Bīatuhu, Aathāruh (Arabic); Aswāq e Arab Ka Mukhtasar Ta'aruf; Kitaab al-Muqaffa V.3rd (research)
- Awards: Presidential Certificate of Honour 2012; Lifetime Achievement Award by All India Association of Arabic Teachers and Scholars 2017; Rashtriya Shiksha Ratan Award 2019

Sayed Kafeel Ahmad Qasmi (born 25 December 1951) is an Indian Islamic scholar, academician, and litterateur of Arabic and Urdu. He has also served in several positions in the Arabic Department of Aligarh Muslim University for 45 years.

== Early life and education ==
Sayed Kafeel Ahmad Qasmi was born on 25 December 1951, in Jairampur, Cuttack district, Orissa (now Odisha), to Sayed Muhammad Saleh.

He received his primary education at home, then up to Arabic IV in Madrasa Arabia Islamia (now Jamia Islamia Markazul Uloom, Sungra). His teachers at Sungra included Muhammad Ismail Katki, Abdul Quddus Katki, Abdul Ghaffar (of Dharamshala, Jajpur), Muhammad Irfan Dhamnagari, Muhammad Ishaq Katki, Muhammad Ismail Patnavi, and Muhammad Yahya Mungeri.

He began his secondary and further education at Darul Uloom Deoband in 1962 and graduated in 1965.

His teachers at Deoband included Basheer Ahmad Khan Bulandshahri, Ibrahim Balyawi, Muhammad Tayyib Qasmi, Syed Fakhruddin Ahmad, Fakhrul Hasan Moradabadi, Islamul Haq Azmi, Akhtar Hussain Deobandi, Sharif Hasan Deobandi, Merajul Haq Deobandi, Naseer Ahmed Khan, Abdul Ahad Deobandi, Anzar Shah Kashmiri, Khurshid Alam Deobandi, Qamaruddin Ahmad Gorakhpuri, and Wahiduzzaman Kairanawi.

He received his intermediate school education at Jamia Millia Islamia, studying with scholars including Abdul Haleem Nadvi and Ijteba Nadwi, in 1966. He completed the Higher Secondary Examination with the First Division and Second Division in 1968.

He completed his B.A. (honours) in Arabic from Aligarh Muslim University with first division and first position in 1971. His theology teacher was Saeed Ahmad Akbarabadi, and his medieval Indian history teacher was Irfan Habib.

He completed his M.A. (Arabic) in 1973, securing first division and first position in 1973, and his MPhil in 1976. In 1986, he got his PhD for writing a dissertation in Arabic on the third volume of Al-Maqrizi's Arabic manuscript, Kitaab al-Muqaffa al-Kabeer, under the supervision of Mukhtaruddin Ahmad.

== Career ==
He was appointed a lecturer (assistant professor) at Banaras Hindu University from December 1975 to February 1976. On 16 August 1976, he was appointed lecturer in the Arabic department of Aligarh Muslim University. On 10 April 1988, he was promoted to reader (associate professor) in the same department. Between 19 December 1997, and 30 December 2016, he served as a professor.

He also served three times as chairman of the Arabic department: the first time from 1999 to 2000; the second time from 2003 to 2006; and the third time from 2011 to 2014. Similarly, he served as the Dean of the Faculty of Arts from 10 July 2014, to 9 July 2016, and finally resigned from the post on 24 December 2016. Meanwhile, he also served as Vice Chancellor three times when the Vice Chancellor and Pro Vice Chancellor went on leave for a short period of time.

== Honors and positions ==
On 14 January 2014, Pranab Mukherjee awarded him with the "President's Certificate of Honor, 2012" for his contributions to Arabic language and literature at a ceremony held at Rashtrapati Bhavan in New Delhi.

In 2017, he was honored with the Lifetime Achievement Award by the All India Association of Arabic Teachers and Scholars.

He was felicitated by the Indian Embassy at the Riyadh International Book Fair in 2011, as well as at the "Sheikh Zayed Islamic Center" in Karachi in November 2005, in recognition of his services.

Ten researchers completed their M.Phil.s, and 18 completed their Ph.D.s under his guidance.

He served as Chairman of Arabic Department in AMU, Aligarh, Dean Faculty of Arts, Coordinator of UGC Schemes, Coordinator for Foreigner Admission, Provost, Assistant, Proctor, Dean Welfare Student, and Warden in various hostels. He has also served as the President of the AMU Aligarh Swimming Club and as a member of the Education Council and Advisory Committee.

Apart from these eight projects, they have been worked on under the DSA and CAS schemes of the University Grants Commission of India under his supervision. Similarly, he has supervised tens of seminars as a convener, director, or coordinator.

== Literary works ==
He is a well-known prose writer in Arabic and Urdu. Fifty of his articles have been published in many influential national and international magazines and journals in Arabic and Urdu. His Urdu articles include Palestinian Resistance Poetry, Comparison of Al-Biruni's and Ibn Battuta's Views on India, and essays such as The Impact of Arabic and Persian on Odia Language and Literature and Postal System in Islamic State.

Also, between 2003 and 2006, he edited three issues of the Arabic Journal Al-Majma' Al-'Ilami Al-Hindi from the Department of Arabic, AMU, and his many Arabic articles were published in it.

=== Books ===
His books include:

- Al-Maqrizi: Hayātuhu, Bīatuhu, Aathāruh (transl. Al-Maqrizi: his life, environment, and effects) Arabic, 1994, Published: Jamia Salafia Press, Banaras
- Aswāq e Arab Ka Mukhtasar Ta'aruf (transl. Arab markets as a brief introduction) Urdu, 2003, Published: Department of Arabic Language and Literature, AMU
- Kitaab al-Muqaffa al-Kabīr, Volume III (investigation and suspension), 2008, Published: Dairatul Ma'arifil Osmania, Hyderabad
- Mukhtasar Tareekh e Adab (transl. A Brief History of Literature) Unpublished

== See also ==
- List of Deobandis
