= Centre for Urdu Language, Literature & Culture =

- Type: Public
- Established: 2007; 18 years ago
- Location: Hyderabad, Telangana, India
- Campus: Urban
- Affiliations: UGC
- Website: Official site

Centre for Urdu Language, Literature & Culture is an Urdu language institute located at Maulana Azad National Urdu University, Hyderabad, Telangana.
