= Syed Ainul Hasan =

Indian poet and academic (born 1957)

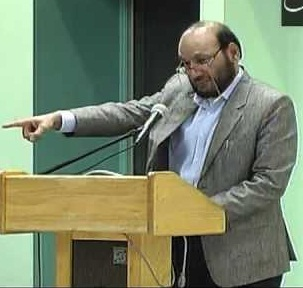
- Professor Syed Ainul Hasan
- Born: 15 February 1957 (age 69); Prayagraj, Uttar Pradesh
- Education: PhD, Master of Arts, Bachelor of Arts
- Alma mater: Jawaharlal Nehru University; Allahabad University
- Occupations: Professor, poet
- Known for: Vice Chancellor, Maulana Azad National Urdu University, Hyderabad. Dean, School of Language, Literature and Culture Studies; Professor & Chairperson, Persian & Central Asian Studies, School of Language, Literature & Culture Studies, Jawaharlal Nehru University, New Delhi-110067 Poetry, Fulbright Scholar
- Spouse: Arshia Hasan
- Children: Kamran Badr, Arman Hasan
- Honors: Padma Shri (2025)

Syed Ainul Hasan is former professor of Persian & Central Asian Studies School of Language, Literature & Culture Studies at Jawaharlal Nehru University, New Delhi. He has had experience with teaching and research for a period of over thirty-two years, and he has designed courses for University of Kashmir, Jawaharlal Nehru University, and Cotton College State University. He played a key role in enhancing Indo Afghan relation by introducing Afghan Resource Centre in Jawaharlal Nehru University, New Delhi. He was awarded President of India certificate of honor award in 2017

He was appointed Vice Chancellor of Maulana Azad National Urdu University, Hyderabad on 23 July 2021

He received the Padma Shri, one of India's highest civilian award, in 2025.

== Areas of interest/specialization ==
Indo-Iran Relations, Literature & Culture Studies, Indology, Globalization

== Career ==
He served as a Fulbright Professor in the Department of Middle Eastern Studies at Rutgers University of New Jersey, USA. He also held the position of Chairperson for Persian and Central Asian Studies at Jawaharlal Nehru University. Additionally, he served as President of the Persian Scholars Association of India in 2009 and 2011 and as President of the Iranian Section of the All India Oriental Conference. In 2007, he was honored with the title of Persian Poet of the Year by the "Wizarat-e-Irshad" of the Islamic Republic of Iran. Furthermore, he was appointed Chairman of the Persian Section for the National Council for Promotion of Urdu Language.

Currently, serving as Vice Chancellor of Maulana Azad National Urdu University, Hyderabad

== Notable Publications ==
He authored and contributed to several significant works, including Dastanboo (Mirza Ghalib's Persian Diary), and Sotunhay-e-Sheir-e-Nov (Trends in New Persian Poetry). His other notable works include Studies on Persian Language and Literature: Issues & Themes, Persian Grammar Book (designed for non-Persian-speaking students), and Mara Hua Chaand (a Hindi novel by Rajkishor translated into Urdu). Additionally, he edited Gauhar-e-shab Charagh-e-ismat, published by the Islamic Wonders Bureau, and authored Naqd-o-Barrasi-e-Adabiyyat-e-Khordsalan (a critical study on children’s literature) and Maulana Azad: Memare-Farhange-Hindo-Irani.

== Ideological orientation ==
He is very close to RSS leadership and participated in the meetings of Muslim Rashtriya Manch (MRM). He also supported the controversial CAA.
