= Arun Kumar (administrator) =

Indian civil servant (born 1953)

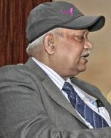

Personal details
- Born: 12 February 1953 (age 73)

Arun Kumar is an Indian civil servant who formerly served as Additional Secretary to Government of India, Secretary of Oil Industry Development Board and Executive Director of Petroleum Conservation Research Association. He also served as Board Director-Incharge of Indian Strategic Petroleum Reserves Limited, Member of the Management Advisory Committee of Bureau of Energy Efficiency (under Ministry of Power) and Member of the Governing council of Centre for High Technology (under Ministry of Petroleum and Natural Gas).

He is a 1976 batch Central Secretariat Service officer.

== Career ==
Kumar joined the Central Secretariat Service in 1974 after qualifying through the Civil Services Examination. He rose through ranks and was later empanelled as Additional Secretary to Government of India in Ministry of Petroleum and Natural Gas in October 2010 by the Appointments Committee of the Cabinet.

Order of precedence
Unknown	Order of Precedence of India as Additional Secretary to Government of India; 2010 to 2013	Incumbent
