= S. S. Sajideen Qasmi =

Indian Islamic scholar, poet and orator

Bulbul-e-Orissa, Maulana Syed Siraj us Sajideen Katki

President of Jamiat Ulama–e–Odisha
- In office 2005–2006
- Preceded by: Muhammad Ismail Katki
- Succeeded by: Muhammad Jalāl Qasmi

2nd Amīr–e–Sharī'at of Odisha
- In office 2005–2006
- Preceded by: Muhammad Ismail Katki
- Succeeded by: Muhammad Jalāl Qasmi

President, Odisha State Unit of Kul-Hind Rabta-e-Madāris-e-Arabia, Darul Uloom Deoband
- In office 2005–2006
- Preceded by: Muhammad Ismail Katki
- Succeeded by: Muhammad Jabir Qasmi

Personal life
- Born: 1939 Dariyapur, Sungra, Cuttack district, Orissa, British India
- Died: 21 October 2006 (aged 66–67) Sungra, Cuttack district, Orissa (now Odisha)
- Resting place: The left side of the mosque at Jamia Islamia Markazul Uloom
- Education: Jamia Islamia Markazul Uloom; Darul Uloom Deoband

Religious life
- Religion: Islam
- Jurisprudence: Hanafi
- Movement: Khatm-e-Nubuwwat movement

Muslim leader
- Teacher: Muhammad Ismail Katki; Fakhruddin Ahmad Muradabadi; Muhammad Tayyib Qasmi; Fakhrul Hasan Moradabadi; Muhammad Salim Qasmi; Anzar Shah Kashmiri

Syed Siraj us Sajideen Katki (Urdu: سید سراج الساجدین کٹکی; 1939–2006), also known as S.S. Sajideen Qasmi, was an Indian Islamic scholar, poet, and orator. He was associated for most of his career with Jamia Islamia Markazul Uloom, Sungra. He served as President of Jamiat Ulama Odisha and as the second Amīr-e-Sharīʿat of Imārat-e-Sharīʿa, Odisha.

== Early life and education ==
Syed Siraj us Sajideen Katki was born in 1939 in Daryapur, Sungra, in the Cuttack district of the Indian state of Orissa (now Odisha). He received his primary education in the Persian and Arabic languages at Madrasa Arabia Islamia, Sungra (now Jamia Islamia Markazul Uloom, Sungra). His teachers there included Muhammad Ismail Katki, Abdul Quddus Katki, Abdul Ghaffar Maninathpuri, Muhammad Ishaq Daryapuri, and Muhammad Ismail Patnavi.

Among his contemporaries were Manzoor Ahmad Qasmi, Amīdul Islam Qasmi, Abdul Matīn Miftahi, Ghulam Kibriya Miftahi, Muhammad Jalal Qasmi, Ikramul Haque Qasmi, Abdur Rahim Miftahi, and Muhammad Ishaq Patnavi.

For higher education, he moved to Darul Uloom Deoband, where he enrolled and graduated in 1380–79 AH (1960–61 AD). His classmates there included Kafilur Rahman Nishat Usmani, who later served as the Mufti of Darul Uloom Deoband.

His teachers of Hadith at the Deoband seminary included Syed Fakhruddin Ahmad, Ibrahim Balyawi, Fakhrul Hasan Moradabadi, Bashir Ahmad Khan Bulandshahri, Zahūr Ahmad Deobandi, Sayed Hasan Deobandi, and Muhammad Tayyib Qasmi.

== Career ==
After completing his education, Katki began working at a school and later joined Jamia Islamia Markazul Uloom as a teacher. He served under the guidance of his father, Sayed Zainul Abidīn and Syed Fakhruddin Ahmad. He was subsequently appointed deputy rector of the institution. During the 1990s, Ismail Katki assigned him administrative responsibility for the seminary in the presence of Ulama and members of the public of Odisha, on the occasion of Ulama conference.

He succeeded his teacher, Ismail Katki. In an interview, Ismail Katki stated that he had selected S.S. Sajideen from among his students to continue institutional responsibilities.

Following the establishment of the Imārat-e-Sharīʿa of India on 2 November 1986 (28 Safar 1407 AH), Katki was elected deputy Amir-e-Sharīʿat for Orissa in 1987 at the Imārat Conference held in Odisha. In 1992 or 1993, he was appointed official deputy Amir-e-Sharīʿat. During the lifetime of Ismail Katki, he also served as vice-president of Jamiat Ulama Orissa and as president of the Majlis-e-Tahaffuz-e-Khatme Nubuwwat, Odisha. On 21 February 2005 (11 Muharram 1426 AH), prior to the funeral prayer of Ismail Katki, he was elected the second Amir-e-Sharīʿat of Odisha in the presence of scholars from the state.

After the death of his teacher, Katki was appointed president of Jamiat Ulama Odisha and president of Rabta-e-Madāris-e-Arabia Odisha, a provincial branch of the Kul-Hind Rabta-e-Madāris-e-Arabia affiliated with Darul Uloom Deoband. He held these positions until his death. He also served as a member of the Odisha Waqf Board.

== Political life ==
Katki began his political involvement with the Odisha Communist Party and later served as its vice-president. In the 1980s, Janaki Ballabh Patnaik, then Chief Minister of Odisha and associated with the Odisha Pradesh Congress Committee (OPCC), requested Ismail Katki to nominate S.S Sajideen for party involvement. Following Ismail Katki's recommendation, he joined the OPCC and remained a member until his death.

Following the 1999 Odisha cyclone, Ghulam Nabi Azad visited Odisha and attended a programme held at CDA, Cuttack, in which Katki also participated. After Katki's speech, Azad commented that individuals like him should take part in national-level politics.

Katki remained a member of the party throughout his life. Within the party, his views were given consideration, and party members at times visited Jamia Islamia Markazul Uloom, Sungra, to meet and consult with him.

== Death ==
Sayed Sirajussajidin Katki died on 21 October 2006 (27 Ramadan 1427 AH). He was buried next to his teacher, Muhammad Ismail Katki, on the left side of the mosque at Jamia Islamia Markazul Uloom, Tabligh Nagar, Kood, in the Cuttack district of Odisha.

Following his death, condolences were expressed at a meeting of the Kul-Hind Rabta-e-Madāris-e-Arabia, held on Monday, 4 December 2006 (12 Dhu al-Qadah 1427 AH), at Darul Uloom Deoband.

== See also ==
- List of Deobandis
- List of Darul Uloom Deoband alumni
