= Institute of Secretariat Training and Management =

Indian government agency

- Motto in English: Efficiency and the Public Good
- Type: A Secretariat Training Institute under the aegis of Department of Personnel and Training
- Established: 1948
- Officer in charge: S D Sharma
- Administrative staff: 99
- Location: New Delhi, Delhi, India; 28°33′06″N 77°10′52″E
- Nickname: ISTM
- Website: Official Web Site
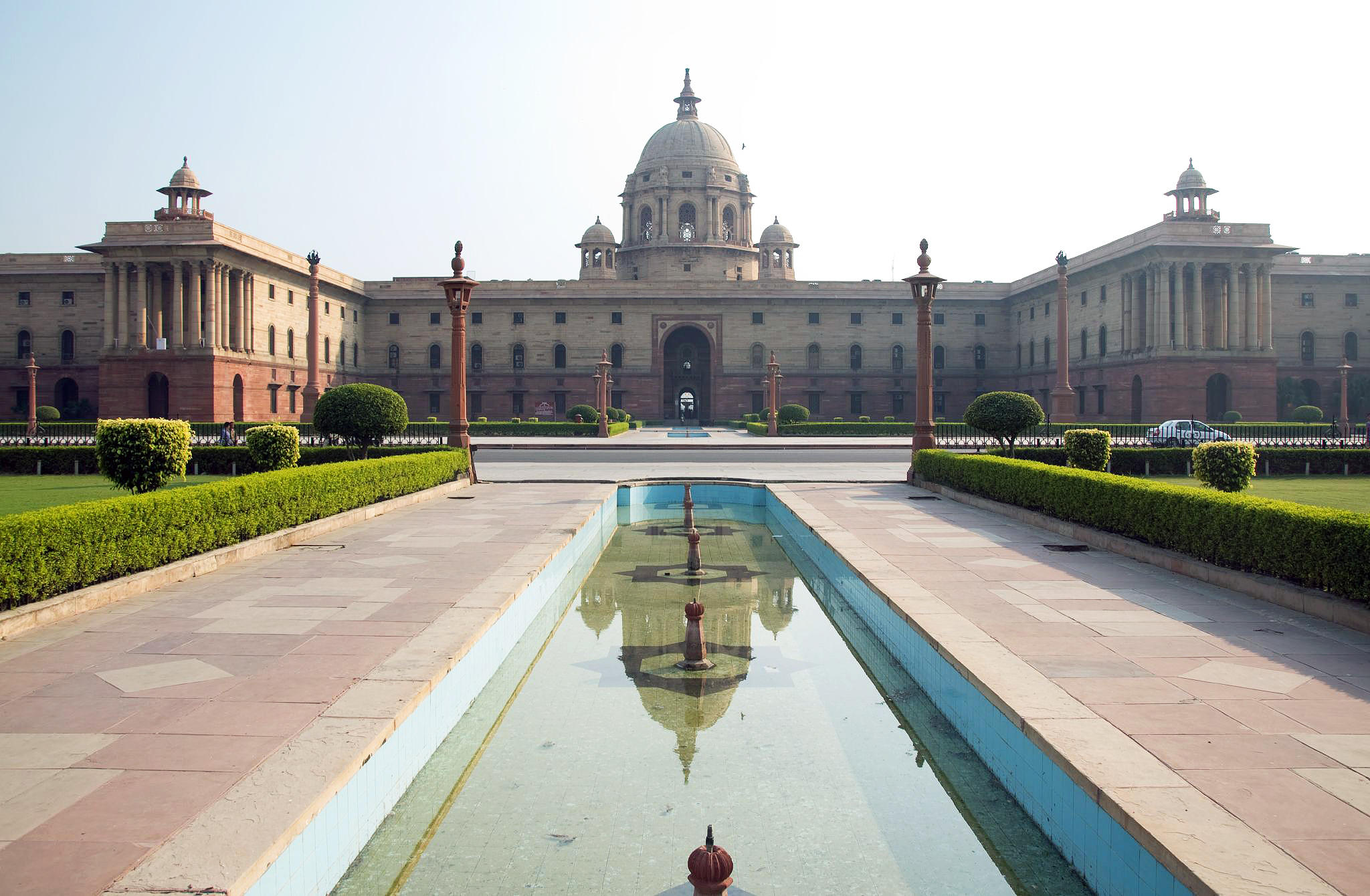
- Secretariat Building, New Delhi

The Institute of Secretariat Training and Management, (acronym ISTM), is a Central Training Institute for civil employees, directly managed by the Department of Personnel and Training, under the Ministry of Personnel, Public Grievances and Pensions, Government of India.

The Institute is headed by Director, who is a career civil servant of the rank of Joint Secretary to Government of India.

== History ==
The Central Secretariat Training School was established by Ministry of Home Affairs in 1948 with the primary objective to provide training to the officers of the Central Secretariat Service (CSS), Central Secretariat Stenographers Service (CSSS) and officers of other subsidiary services based at the Central Secretariat like Railway Board Secretariat Service.

In year 1971, it was renamed as Institute of Secretariat Training and Management and the mandate was expanded to include officers of the State Governments, Union Territory Administrations, Central Public Sector Enterprises, Central Autonomous Bodies and other organizations in specialized and general areas and was renamed the Institute of Secretariat Training and Management. Presently, ISTM is the nodal agency for providing orientation training to all central government employees.

The Institute also provides consultancy services, undertakes research studies and help develop trainers and training techniques. Further, it also holds regular seminars for SAARC and Commonwealth countries.

== Facilities ==
Faculty: ISTM has an approved strength of 29 faculty members, on deputation from various government services who are provided training under different courses such as Trainers Courses, like, Direct Trainer Skills (DTS) and Design of Training (DOT) before they assume their responsibilities. The Institute also invites university professors, experts and administrators as guest faculty, from time to time, for special training modules.

Campus: ISTM campus consists of four buildings, Administrative Block, Hexagon (Seminar Halls) Complex, Library Building, and Hostel Block, each dedicated for a specific purpose. The Administrative Block houses all the offices of the Institute and a committee room whereas the Hexagon Complex, holds 8 seminar rooms, 2 conference halls and 2 auditoria.

Computers and Computer Laboratory: The Institute is equipped with a computer centre which manages the 130 node LAN network, cyber facility which connects the Administrative block, Library and Hostel complex.

Library: The library has a collection of 18,500 reference books and 23,600 instruction manuals and subscribes to many national and international magazines, journals, periodicals and dailies. It also houses 4 classrooms, each accommodating 130 trainees.

ISTM also has an 80-room hostel facility aimed at outstation trainees.

== Courses ==
ISTM has put in place various training programs, on a variety of subjects, such as CSS/CSSS Cadre Training Plan, programs on Management development, Financial management, RTI-Capacity building and Behavioural training, Secretarial / CSSS training, Computer courses and Trainers' development programs.

== Publications ==
ISTM has brought several handbooks, guides and reference material for use in training programs.

- Handbook for Personnel Officers - 2013
- Modified Assured Career Progression (MACP) - A Study
- Handbook for Inquiry Officers and Disciplinary Aut
- Fundamental Rules & Supplementary Rules
- Constitution of India
- ADR Reading Material
- SDR Reading Material
- Orientation Training Program - Phase 1
- Orientation Training Program - Phase 2
- CBPR Poverty Alleviation

== Administration ==
=== List of directors ===
Sr. No.	Name	From	Till	Occupation
1.	B.D. Tewari	1948	1956	CSS
2.	V.K. Menon	1956	1957	CSS
3.	B.S. Atri	1957	1957	CSS
4.	S.K. Sen	1958	1958	CSS
5.	G. Nath	1958	1965	CSS
6.	V.P. Mithal	1965	1971	CSS
7.	M.L. Walwekar	1971	1973	CSS
8.	J.C. Majumdar	1973	1974	CSS
9.	H.L. Kapur	1973	1974	CSS
10.	R. Rangarajan	1974	1978	CSS
11.	B.S. Yadav	1978	1983	CSS
12.	R.C. Gupta	1983	1985	CSS
13.	H.S. Sarkar	1985	1986	IAS
14.	B.S. Baswan	1986	1990	IAS
15.	R.S.V. Subramanian	1990	1992	CSS
16.	I.C. Bhatia	1992	1992	CSS
17.	A.K. Chaudhuri	1992	1995	CSS
18.	J.P. Pati	1995	2001	CSS
19.	R.K. Saini	2001	2008	CSS
20.	Dr. Khwaja M. Shahid	2008	2012	CSS
21.	Umesh Kumar	2012	2016	CSS
22.	Dr. Sunita H. Khurana	2015	2019	CSS
23.	Rashmi Chowdhary (Additional Charge)	2019	2020	IRPS
24.	S.D. Sharma	2020	CURRENT	CSS

== See also ==
- Central Secretariat Service
- Railway Board Secretariat Service
