= Centralized Public Grievance Redress and Monitoring System =

2007 Indian government initiative

Centralised Public Grievance Redress and Monitoring System (CPGRMS)
- State Emblem of India

Grievance Redressal Mechanism overview
- Headquarters: New Delhi
- Ministers responsible: Narendra Modi, Prime Minister of India; Jitendra Singh, Union Minister of State for the DARPG
- Grievance Redressal Mechanism executives: Nivedita Shukla Verma, Secretary of the DARPG; Sardendu Kumar Pandey, Director (PG-I)
- Parent department: Department of Administrative Reforms and Public Grievances (DARPG)
- Website: pgportal.gov.in

Centralised Public Grievance Redress and Monitoring System (CPGRMS) is a centralised system that allows anyone to file complaints against any department of the Central and state governments of India. It is one of the flagship initiatives for the reformation in governance started by the Indian central government through addressing the grievances of the general public.

== History ==
It was created in June 2007 by the Department of Administrative Reforms & Public Grievances (DARPG). Under the public grievance mechanism any citizen of India can raise their problems, grievance or pleas to the central govt and state government Ministries and Departments. Grievances can be submitted to all important portfolio ministers and departments. The system has been designed in-house by the National Informatics Centre (NIC) team. It has a telephonic feedback feature also.

The Prime Minister of India is the Supreme Head of Public Grievances. Jitendra Singh Rana is currently the Union Minister of State for the DARPG. Garima Yadav is its Deputy Secretary (PG-II) and Sanjeev Saxena is its Senior Director (IT).

== Other Public Grievance Redress Portal Systems Offered by the Union of India ==
01. President's Secretariat Helpline Portal for Lodging Public Grievances through the Secretariat of the President of India.

02. CPGRMS-PMO Portal for Lodging Public Grievances through the Office of the Prime Minister (O/o the PM).

03. Directorate of Public Grievances (DPG) Portal for Lodging Public Grievances through the Secretariat of the Cabinet.
