= Milan K. Sanyal =

Indian physicist (born 1954)

Milan Kumar Sanyal
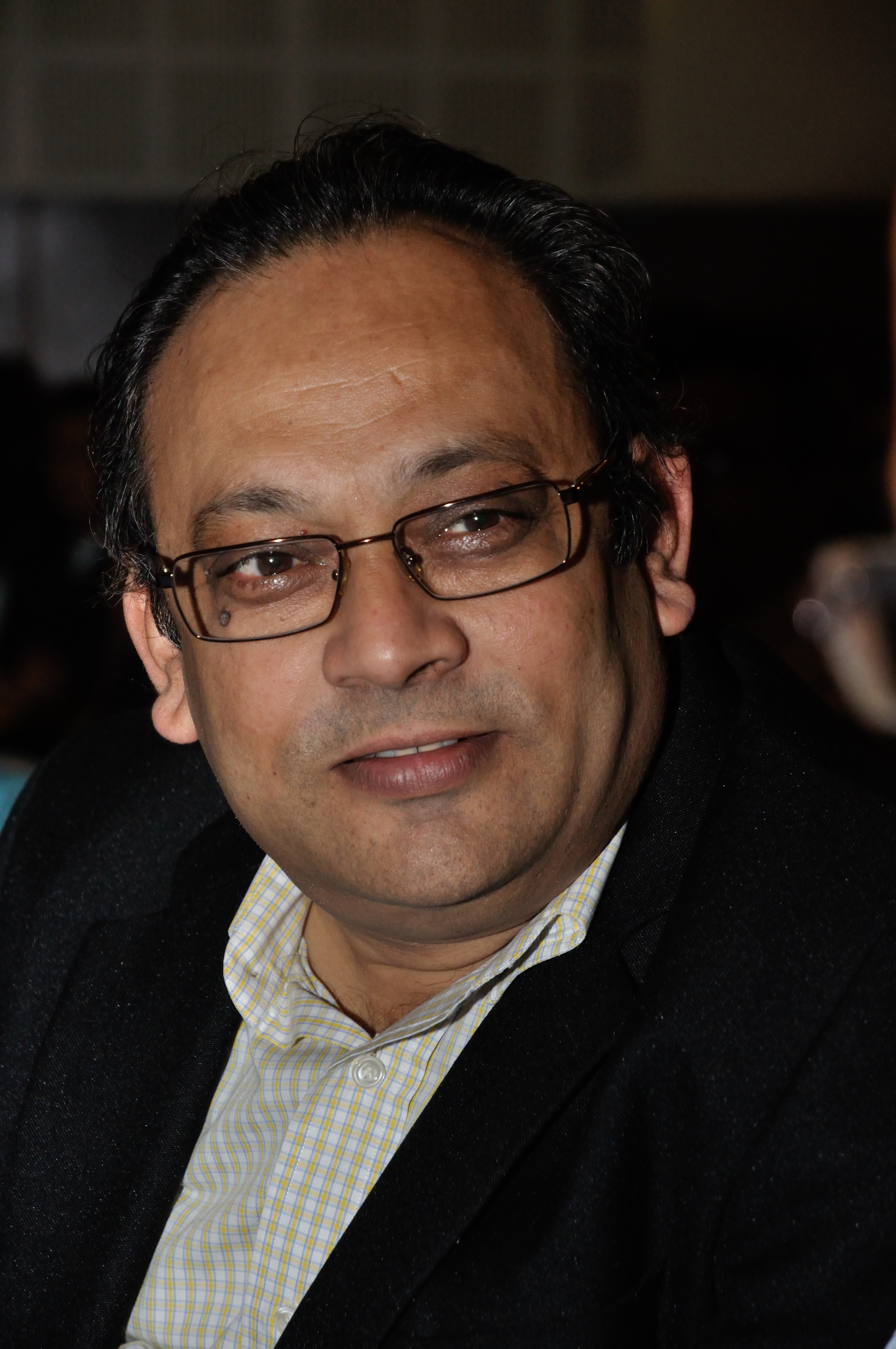
- Milan K. Sanyal
- Born: 6 January 1954 (age 72); Ranaghat, West Bengal
- Title: PhD

Milan K. Sanyal (born 6 January 1954) is an Indian physicist, active in the fields of surface physics, nanoscience and nanotechnology. Prof. Sanyal was the director of the Saha Institute of Nuclear Physics from 2009 to 2014 and is now Senior Professor in the institute. Recently he has been appointed co-chairman of the India-Japan Science Council.
