= Petroleum Conservation Research Association =

Energy efficiency promotion agency in India

The Petroleum Conservation Research Association (PCRA) is an organization established in India in 1978, under the aegis of the Ministry of Petroleum and Natural Gas of Government of India. It is engaged in promoting efficient energy use in various sectors of the economy. It helps the government in proposing policies and strategies aimed at India's dependency on oil, in order to save money, reduce the environmental impact of oil use and also conserve fossil fuel.

== Mandate ==
India's demand for petroleum products is increasing at a rate of approximately 3-4% per annum. Some of this usage, the PCRA argues, is avoidable: it sponsored a project in Delhi which is demonstrated that fuel worth Rs. 994 cr per annum is being burnt at traffic signals due to idling of vehicles at red lights. Energy efficiency measures to reduce by 2% India's use of petroleum products, worth Rs. 4 Lakh Crores per annum, could save the country's Rs. 8,000 Crores worth of imports.

The PCRA is mandated to promote popular awareness of the importance of energy conservation. It cites an international acceptance that energy efficiency measures, like turning off car engines at traffic signals and driving at speeds of 45–50 km/h, could help most countries to reduce their use of petroleum products by 20%. The PCRA promotes a nationwide mass media awareness campaign titled "Save Fuel Yaani Save Money", broadcast on television, radio, and in newspapers. The campaign mascot, Yaani, is a piggy bank, representing saving. The PCRA took the campaign to the India International Trade Fair – 09, where the PCRA stall featured interactive games and quizzes to promote energy efficiency.

The PCRA aims to become a center of excellence for conservation of hydrocarbons & environment protection for sustainable development on our inherent strength. Its mission is to reach efficient energy use and environment protection leading to Improvement in Quality of Life. Its objectives are:

1) To formulate strategies and promote measures for accelerating conservation of petroleum products leading to environment protection, energy security and sustainable development.

2) To create awareness among masses about the importance, benefits and methods of conserving petroleum products & clean environment by enhancing information and capacity building.

3) To promote research, development and deployment efforts aimed at petroleum conservation & environment protection, support & facilitate efforts for adoption and dissemination of fuel efficient technologies and substitution of petroleum products with alternate fuels and renewable.

4) To establish synergistic institutional linkages at the national & international levels in the areas of petroleum conservation & environment protection.

5) To provide training and technical advisory services, designed to achieve economy & efficiency in use of petroleum products for cleaner environment.

6) To function as a think tank to the Government of India, for proposing policies and strategies on petroleum conservation and environment protection, aimed at reducing excessive dependence on oil.

Travel is an indispensable requirement of the modern-day world. There is an increasing dependence on fuels required to run various means of transport. Most of the fuel requirement in India is still being met through the burning of the ever-depleting fossil fuels in the form of petrol and diesel. These sources shall not merely be for a limited period which shall be exhausted over a span of time but the pollution caused by them shall also contaminate the surrounding environmental components such as soil, air and water.
