= Zafar Sareshwala =

Indian businessman and former chancellor

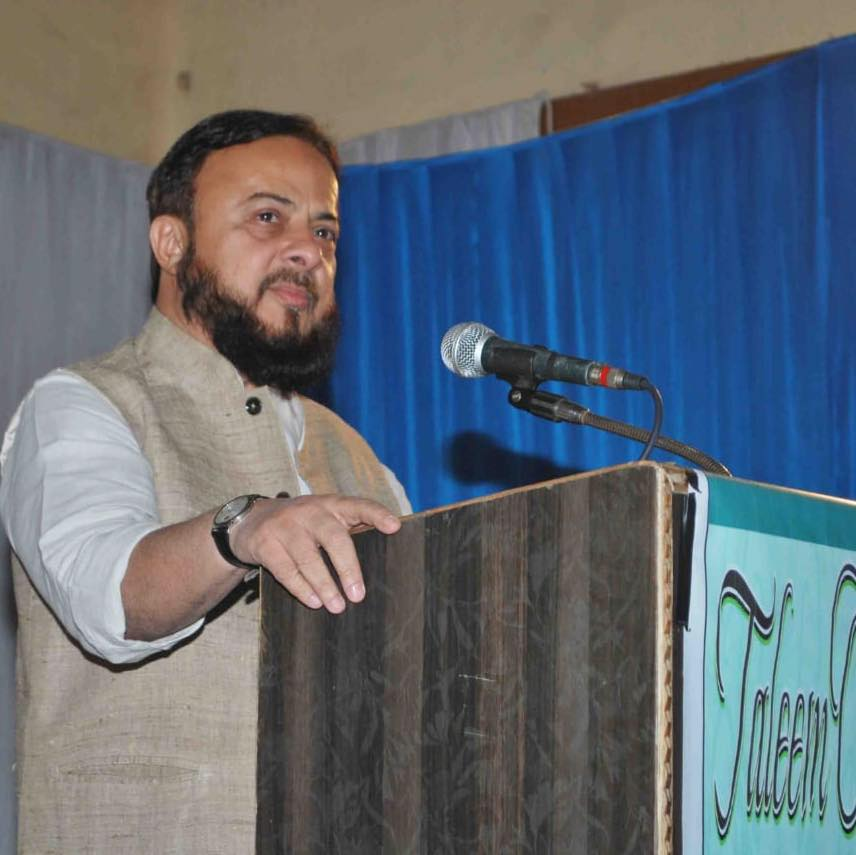
- Zafar Sareshwala
- Born: Zafar Yunus Sareshwala; December 9, 1962 (age 63); India
- Occupation: Businessman
- Known for: Chancellor of Maulana Azad National Urdu University, supporter of Narendra Modi
- Spouse: Asiya Zafar Sareshwala
- Children: 3
- Parents: Mohammed Yunus Sareshwala (father); Saleha Yunus Sareshwala (mother)

Zafar Yunus Sareshwala (born 9 December 1962) is an Indian businessman, owner of Parsoli Corporation, and former chancellor of Maulana Azad National Urdu University. A member of the Tablighi Jamaat, Sareshwala has gained considerable public attention for being a close supporter and confidant of Narendra Modi, the current Prime Minister of India.

== Biography ==
Sareshwala is a mechanical engineer by training and considered an expert in Islamic banking and finance. In 2001, he organised protests in Delhi against Quran burning by Hindu extremists. His family businesses suffered significant losses during the 2002 Gujarat riots, after which he and a group of Indian expatriates explored legal action against Modi in the International Court of Justice. However, Sareshwala later reconciled with Modi, meeting him in London in 2003 and developing close political and business ties thereafter.

He later claimed that engaging with Modi and the Bharatiya Janata Party (BJP) would benefit Indian Muslims politically, citing several outcomes through his relationship with Modi. However, his position drew criticism from human rights groups and Muslim activists, with some accusing him of opportunism.

== Controversies ==
In 2010, Sareshwala and other directors of Parsoli Corporation were barred from participating in India’s capital markets by the Securities and Exchange Board of India (SEBI), due to findings of share fraud and unauthorized transfer of shareholder assets. In July 2013, Parsoli’s broker registration was cancelled for additional violations.

== Chancellorship ==
In 2015, Sareshwala was appointed as the Chancellor of Maulana Azad National Urdu University (MANUU), a move that was widely interpreted as a political reward by critics. Various Muslim organisations and university affiliates voiced concerns over his lack of academic background and previous fraud allegations. His tenure ended in May 2018.

== Personal life ==
Zafar Sareshwala has three children.
