= Dr. Abdul Haq Urdu University =

State public University in Andhra Pradesh, India

- Other name: AHUU
- Motto: محبت محنت خدمت
- Motto in English: Love Labor Service
- Type: Public
- Established: 2016; 10 years ago
- Academic affiliations: UGC
- Budget: State Government Grants
- Chancellor: Governor of Andhra Pradesh
- Vice-Chancellor: Patan Shaik Shavalli Khan
- Location: Kurnool, Andhra Pradesh, India; 15.79°N 78.03°E
- Website: www.ahuuk.ac.in

Dr. Abdul Haq Urdu University is a state public university established by the Government of Andhra Pradesh under A.P. State Legislature Act - 2016 located in Kurnool, Andhra Pradesh, India. The university is named after Dr. Abdul Haq, a renowned educationist and philanthropist of Rayalaseema who is the founder of Osmania College, Kurnool.

== Objectives of the university ==
The objectives of the university are to promote and develop the Urdu language; to impart education and training in vocational and technical subjects through the medium of Urdu; to provide wider access to people desirous of pursuing programmes of higher education and training in the Urdu medium through teaching on the campus as well as at a distance and to provide a focus on women's education.

== Bilingual facility ==
The medium of instruction in all classes is in both Urdu and English except M.A. (Urdu).

== See also ==
- Maulana Azad National Urdu University
- Maulana Mazharul Haque Arabic and Persian University

== General references ==
- "Prof. Muzaffar Shahmiri is appointed VC of Dr. Abdul Haq Urdu University". Siasat.com. 23 March 2016.
- "Dr. Abdul Haq Urdu University". Ruk.ac.in. 16 August 2016.
- "Shri. Satish Chandra, IAS is appointed as Vice-Chancellor In-charge of Dr. Abdul Haq Urdu University, Kurnool". ahuuk.ac.in. 24 March 2021.
- "Shri. J. Shyamala Rao, IAS is appointed as Vice-Chancellor In-charge of Dr. Abdul Haq Urdu University, Kurnool". ahuuk.ac.in. 6 December 2021.
- "Prof. P. Fazul Rahaman is appointed as Vice-Chancellor of Dr. Abdul Haq Urdu University, Kurnool". ahuuk.ac.in. 15 February 2022.
