= Additional District and Sessions Judge =

- Seal of the Government of Bangladesh

{{{post}}}
- Style: Honourable, Learned
- Member of: Judiciary of Bangladesh
- Reports to: Supreme Court of Bangladesh, Ministry of Law
- Seat: District headquarters
- Appointer: President of Bangladesh
- Constituting instrument: Constitution of Bangladesh
- Formation: 2007

The Additional District and Sessions Judge (ADSJ) is a judge in the districts of Bangladesh who exercises both civil and criminal jurisdiction. The ADSJ holds judicial authority equivalent to that of a District and Sessions Judge. Officers from Grade-2 of the Bangladesh Judicial Service are appointed as Additional District and Sessions Judges. In the absence of the District and Sessions Judge, the Additional District and Sessions Judge acts as the deputy and assumes the responsibilities of the District and Sessions Judge.

== Appointment ==
According to Articles 115 and 133 of the Constitution of Bangladesh, the President of Bangladesh appoints Additional District and Sessions Judges. The Law Ministry, in consultation with the Supreme Court, handles the postings and transfers of Additional District and Sessions Judges.

== Jurisdiction and Powers ==
When exercising criminal jurisdiction, the Additional District and Sessions Judge is referred to as an Additional Sessions Judge, and when exercising civil jurisdiction, they are referred to as an Additional District Judge.

Criminal Jurisdiction: The Additional Sessions Judge can impose all forms of punishment prescribed by law, including the death penalty and life imprisonment.

Civil Jurisdiction: The revision authority of the Additional District Judge includes appeals in civil matters, with a maximum value of 500 million Bangladeshi taka.

== Rank ==
According to the Warrant of Precedence (Bangladesh), the rank of the Additional District and Sessions Judge is 17.
