= Jamia Islamia Markazul Uloom =

Islamic seminary in Cuttack district of the Indian state of Odisha

Jamia Islamia Markazul Uloom, Sungra
- جامعہ اسلامیہ مرکز العلوم سونگڑہ
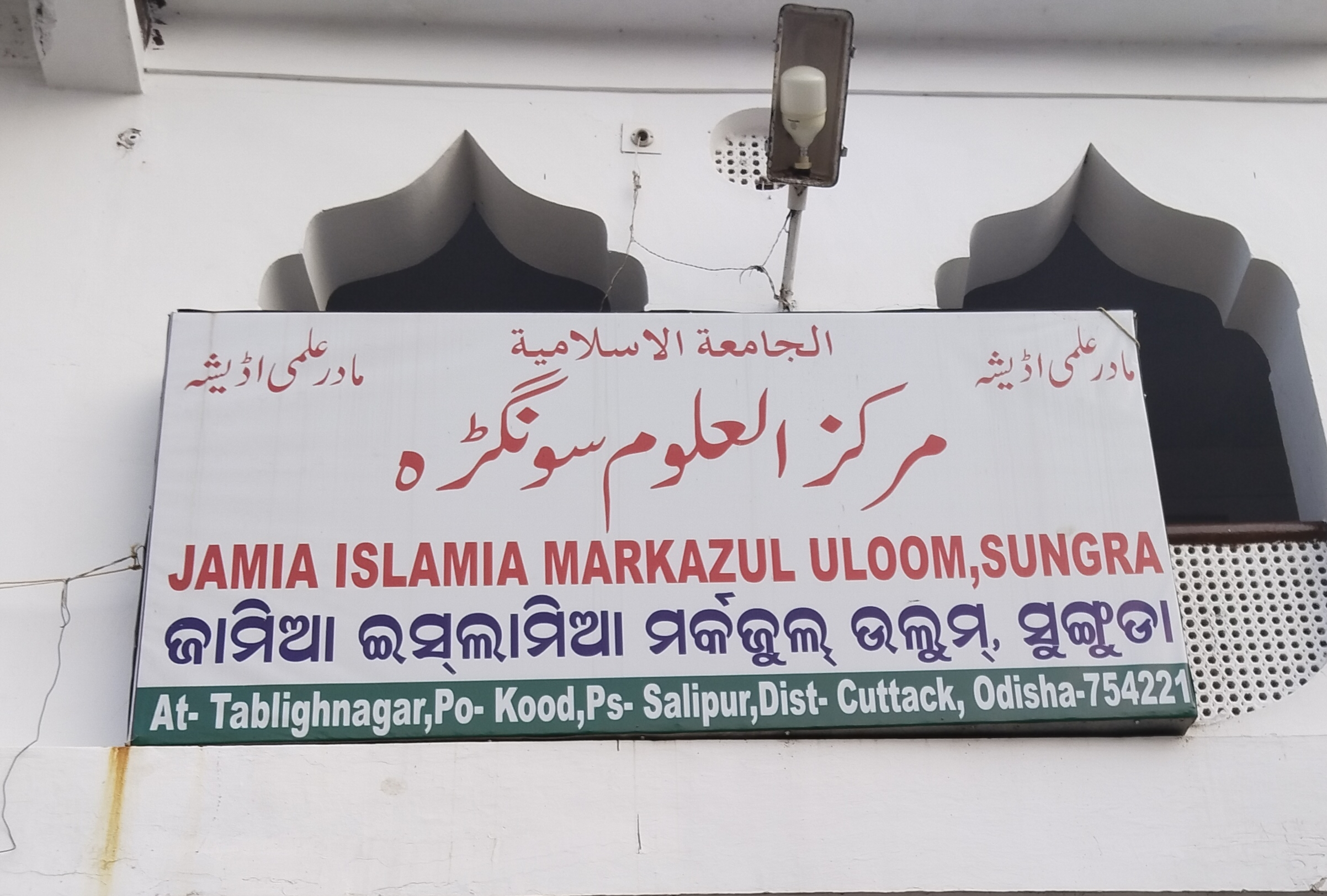
- The signboard of Jamia Islamia Markazul Uloom Sungra
- Type: Islamic university
- Established: 1946 (80 years ago)
- Rector: Sayed Naqībul Amin Barqi Qasmi
- Location: Tabligh Nagar, Post Office: Kood, Salepur block, Cuttack district, Odisha, India; 754221
- Website: Official website

Jamia Islamia Markazul Uloom, also spelled as Jamia Islamia Markaz-Ul-Uloom, is the oldest Islamic educational institution of the Deobandi tredition in the Cuttack district of Odisha, India.

== History ==
Jamia Islamia Markazul Uloom Sungra actually started as a school, but in 1945, when Anjuman Tabligh-e-Islam was established, that school came under the supervision of the Anjuman, and the Anjuman converted this school into an Arabic seminary, transferred it, and named it Madrasa Arabia Islamia Sungra. Then, on 29 December 1946, Muhammad Ismail Katki was elected the preacher of the Anjuman and the president of this madrasa, and on 7 May 1951, he was appointed as a permanent dignitary by the Anjuman.

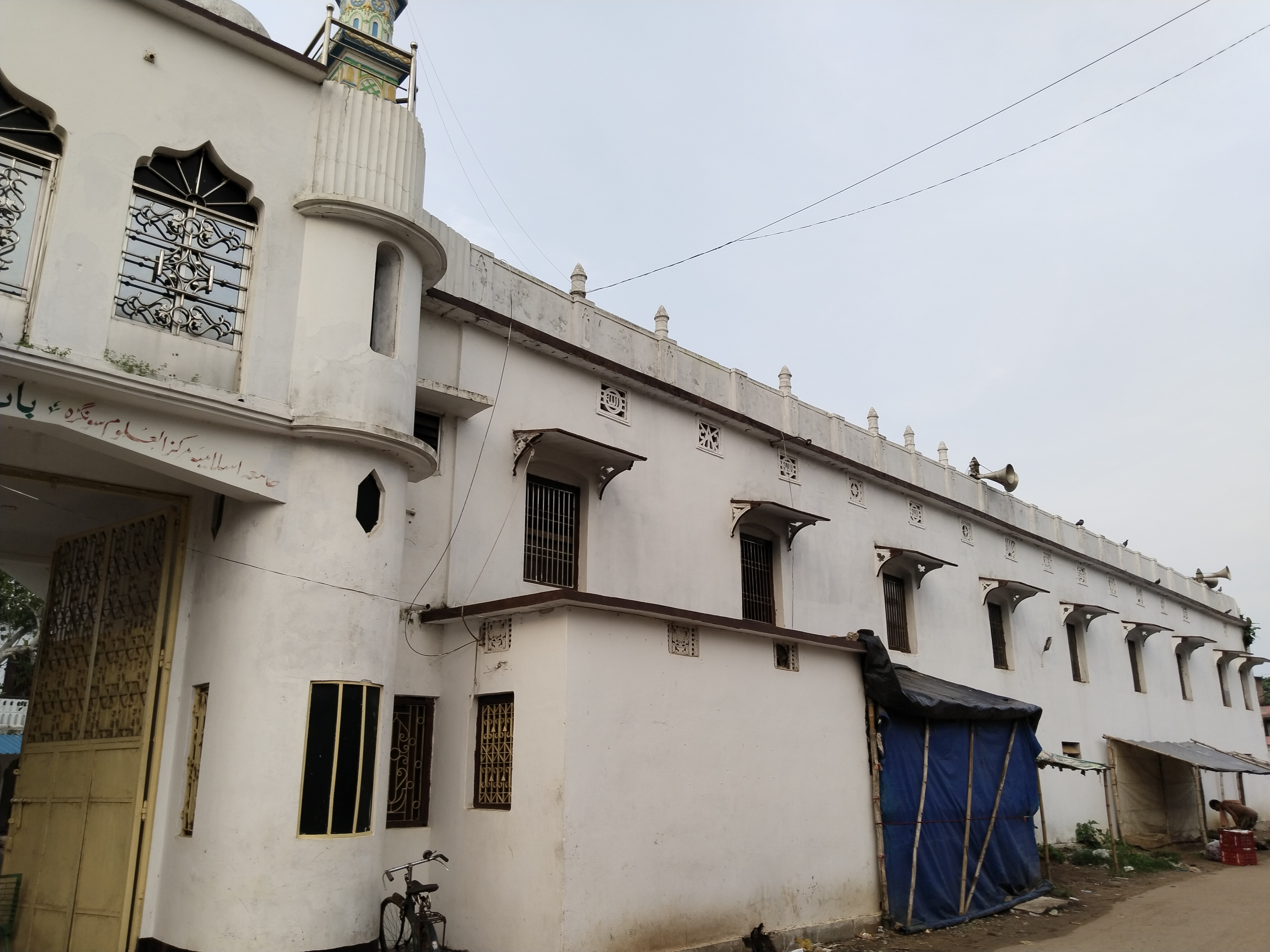
Exterior view of Jamia Islamia Markazul Uloom

In 1987, on the occasion of the Imārat Conference, Sirajussajidin Katki changed the name of the seminary from "Madrasa Arabia Islamia Sungra" to "Markazul Uloom Madrasa Arabia Islamia Sungra". During his tenure, it was renamed "Al Jamia Al-Islamia Markazul Uloom", and now this institution is registered as Jamia Islamia Markazul Uloom.

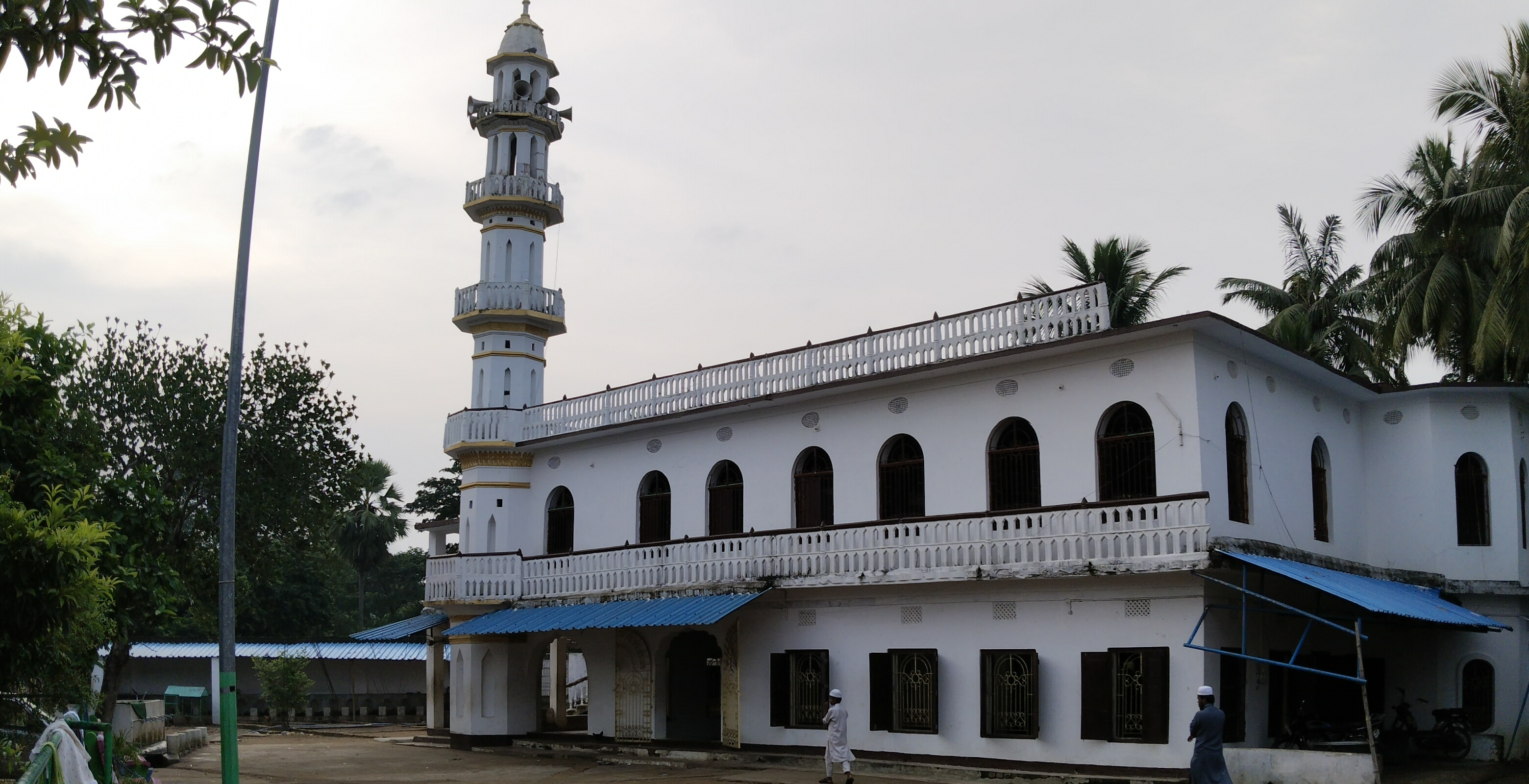
Jamia Islamia Markazul Uloom's Mosque, "Markazul Masājid"

Hussain Ahmad Madani was the patron of this seminary from the first day, then Asad Madani was its patron until his demise, and the current patron is Arshad Madani.

== Administration ==
No	Name (birth–death)	Term of office	
1	Muhammad Ismail Katki (1914–2005)	1946	c. 1993
2	Sirajussajidin Katki (1939–2006)	c. 1993	2006
3	Abdul Hamid Markazi (d. 3 April 2018; As the vice rector)	2006	2018
4	Sayed Naqībul Amīn Barqi (b. ?)	2006	--

== See also ==
- Jamia Ashraful Uloom
