= Muhammad Ismail Katki =

Indian Islamic scholar (1914–2005)

Munazir e Islam, Maulana Muhammad Ismail Katki
- محمد اسماعیل کٹکی

President of Jamiat Ulama Odisha
- In office Unknown–2005
- Succeeded by: S. S. Sajideen Qasmi

1st Ameer-e-Shari'at of Imarat-i-Shar'ia, Odisha
- In office 1964–2005
- Succeeded by: S. S. Sajideen Qasmi

Personal life
- Born: 6 January 1914 Rasoolpur, Sungra, Cuttack district, Bihar and Orissa, British India (now Odisha, India)
- Died: 20 February 2005 (aged 91) Sungra, Cuttack district, Orissa
- Resting place: The left side of the mosque at Jamia Islamia Markazul Uloom
- Notable work(s): Yadgar e Yadgir, Islam e Qadiani, Zara Ghaur Karein
- Education: Madrasa Shahi; Darul Uloom Deoband

Religious life
- Religion: Islam
- Jurisprudence: Hanafi
- Movement: Khatm-e-Nubuwwat movement

Muslim leader
- Teacher: Hussain Ahmad Madani; Murtaza Hasan Chandpuri; Muhammad Miyan Deobandi; Asghar Hussain Deobandi; Muhammad Shafi; Muhammad Tayyib Qasmi
- Students: S. S. Sajideen Qasmi; Kafeel Ahmad Qasmi; Shah Alam Gorakhpuri

Muhammad Ismail Katki (Urdu: محمد اسماعیل کٹکی; 1914–2005) was an Indian Islamic scholar and writer. He was associated with the Khatm-e-Nubuwwat movement in India, particularly in the state of Odisha. He served as the first Ameer-e-Shari'at of Imarat-e-Shar'ia Odisha and also held the position of president of Jamiat Ulama Odisha.

== Early life and education ==
Muhammad Ismail Katki was born on 6 January 1914, in Rasoolpur, Sungra, Bihar and Orissa Province (now Odisha). It is stated that he and Ataullah Shah Bukhari have the same maternal village.

Katki received his primary education from his paternal aunt, Seyyida Khatoon. He began studying the Dars-i Nizami curricula at Madrasa Islamia, Sungra, where he received instructions on courses up to Hidayat an-Nahw (Arabic: هداية النحو) under Muhammad Umar Katki. He pursued his further studies at Madrasa Shahi in Moradabad, where his teachers included Muhammad Miyan Deobandi, Ismail Sambhali, Abdul Haq Madani, and Qudratullah Qudrat. He was admitted to Darul Uloom Deoband, where he completed his studies in 1934. At the Deoband seminary, his teachers included Asghar Hussain Deobandi, Hussain Ahmad Madani, Izaz Ali Amrohi, Muhammad Shafi, and Muhammad Tayyib Qasmi.

During his studies, he took an interest in religious debates and learned their principles from Murtaza Hasan Chandpuri.

At the age of fifteen, he debated Ahmadi Muslims for the first time in Pindi Bahauddin, Punjab (presently in Punjab, Pakistan), under the supervision of Sanaullah Amritsari.

He learned Tajwid and Qira'at in the Hafs 'an Asim tradition from Abdul Wahid Deobandi at Darul Uloom Deoband and Muhammad Abdullah at Madrasa Shahi in Moradabad.

== Career ==
After graduating from Deoband Seminary, Katki was first appointed as a second mawlawi and a Persian and Urdu teacher at Ravenshaw Collegiate School in Cuttack. After that, he worked as a teacher at Govt. Boys High School, Jeypore, in the Koraput district of Odisha, until 1947.

On the order of Hussain Ahmad Madani, he became a preacher in 1946 by joining the Anjuman Tabligh e Islam, which was founded in 1945 in Sungra, Odisha. In 1946, Anjuman Tabligh e Islam established Madrasa Arabia Islamia (now Jamia Islamia Markazul Uloom) in Tabligh Nagar, Sungra, and he was appointed as its first principal, then rector.

He significantly contributed to the Khatm-e-Nubuwwat movement. From the time of his graduation until the 1990s, he participated in over ninety debates, among which the debates on the rejection of Ahmadiyya Islam include the Bhadrak debate of 1958, the Yadgir debate of 1963, and the Kothagudem debate of 1988. Also, the 1979 Barabati Stadium debate on the rejection of Barelvism is worth mentioning.

He influenced around 8,000 people to convert from Ahmadiyya to Sunni Islam and contributed to the movement through his lectures and sermons.

== Honours and positions ==
Katki served as Odisha's first Ameer-e-Shari'at for 41 years, from 1964 until his death in 2005. Prior to his passing, he was the president of Jamiat Ulama Odisha and held that position for more than 40 years. In 1986, he was chosen to serve as the All India Majlis-e-Tahaffuz-e-Khatm-e-Nubuwwat's Vice President.

In 1992, he was chosen as a member of Darul Uloom Deoband's Majlis-e Shura (advisory committee) and held this position for 14 years until his death in 2005. He also served as the President of the Odisha branch of the Kul-Hind Rabta-e-Madaris-e-Islamia Arabia, Darul Uloom Deoband.

He was a supporter of the Indian National Congress and remained associated with it until his late life. He was also active in the Indian independence movement. He was also a member of the working committee of Jamiat Ulama-e-Hind.

== Literary works ==
Katki's works include:

- Yadgar e Yadgir (1965)
- Islam e Qadiani
- Quran e Qadiani (First Edition: 24 February 1946; Second Edition: February 2020; which was once again republished in a booklet format by Shah Alam Gorakhpuri as part of the publication titled Muhasaba e Qadianiyyat, under the supervision of Allah Wasaya from the Aalmi Majlis Tahaffuz Khatm-e-Nubuwwat, Pakistan.)
- Zara Ghaur Kerein (Katki's writings are collected in this book by Shah Alam Gorakhpuri.)
- Munazara e Bhadrak
- Qadiani Kahin Ki Musalman Nohanti? (In Odia language; transl. Why aren't Qadianis Muslims?)

== Death ==
He died on 20 February 2005 (11 Muharram 1426 AH) at the age of 91 in Sungra, Cuttack district, Orissa (now Odisha).

His demise was expressed in the meeting of the working committee of Darul Uloom Deoband held on 18 Jumada l-Ula 1426 AH (25 July 2005).

== See also ==
- List of Deobandis
- List of Darul Uloom Deoband alumni
