= Sugata Sanyal =

Professor

Sugata Sanyal is a Professor in the School of Technology and Computer Science at Tata Institute of Fundamental Research. He is well known for his contributions in the field of Network Security and Computer Architecture.

== Education ==
Sugata Sanyal received a PhD in Computer Science in 1992 from University of Mumbai. Before that he received his master's degree from IIT Kharagpur in 1973 specializing in Electronics and Electrical Engineering and bachelor's degree in Electronics and Telecommunication Engineering from Jadavpur University in 1973.

== Career ==
Sugata Sanyal joined the School of Technology and Computer Science at Tata Institute of Fundamental Research in 1973 and has been working there since then. He was also a visiting professor in University of Cincinnati, Ohio, USA from July 2003 to September 2003. He has been actively involved in research and development activities and has over 100 publications in peer reviewed international journals. He also played a major role in the development of various projects of national importance. During 1973–1985, he was involved in developing a large complex real-time multi-computer based Integrated Data Handling System for On Line Air-Sector Control. This project was a major national achievement which earned him the Vividhlaxi Audyogik Samsodhan Vikas Kendra Award (VASVIK). During 1977–1980, he was also involved in development of 16 bit, highly reliable computer system. The Processor acted as the Central Controlling Element for a rugged mobile exchange of the High Availability Computerized System class. This Real Time system was widely used by various Indian groups. During the period of 1978- 1980, he was involved in development of 3D Scanning Radar Attachment Project which was connected with the 3D Scanning Radar of the Cyclone Warning Radar Station of Indian Meteorological Department. Moreover, he has been actively involved in numerous projects in the area of Network, Security, Parallel Processing and Computer Algorithms.

== Honors ==
- Recipient of IEEE distinguished Lecturer award in 1997.
- Co-recipient of Vividhlaxi Audyogik Samsodhan Vikas Kendra Award (VASVIK) for Electrical and Electronics Science and Technologies for the year 1985 for successful and completely indigenous design, development, testing, know-how transfer to production unit and final successful live field -trial of a large complex real-time multi-computer based Integrated Data Handling System for On Line Air-Sector Control.
- Recipient of first class first with honours in B.Tech. with three gold medals.
- Senior member of IEEE
- Life member of ACM.

Sugata Sanyal is also currently serving in the editorial and advisory board of several international journals.
