= Officer on Special Duty =

Civil service position in South and Southeast Asia

Officer on Special Duty (OSD), or Special Duties Officer, is an officer post in the civil services in Brunei, Bangladesh, India, Malaysia, and Pakistan.

== Brunei ==
Special Duties Officer (Pegawai Tugas-Tugas Khas) is an officer level of Brunei Darussalam's Civil Service which working under each ministry in Brunei. Brunei's Special Duties Officers can be differentiated by their position levels;

- Minister (Menteri)
  - Deputy Minister (Timbalan Menteri)
- Permanent Secretary (Setiausaha Tetap)
  - Grade A, B and C
- Deputy Permanent Secretary (Timbalan Setiausaha Tetap)
- Senior Special Duties Officer (Pengarah, Timbalan Pengarah)
  - Superscale Special
  - Superscale A, B and C
- Senior Special Duties Officer (Pegawai Tugas-Tugas Khas Kanan, Pegawai Kanan)
  - Group 1, 2 and 3 (Bahagian 1, 2 and 3)
- Special Duties Officer (Pegawai Tugas-Tugas Khas)
  - Grade 1 and Grade 2 (Tingkat 1 and Tingkat 2)

== India ==
An officer on Special Duty is an officer in the Indian civil service of the status between a secretary and an undersecretary in the Government of India.

The practice dates back to the British colonial rule in India, and was explained to the Central Legislative Assembly by a government spokesman in 1931 as follows:

"There are two principal criteria in appointing an OSD in the civil services -

1. When an officer by his appointment brings far greater economic benefit to the government than that spent in his appointment
2. When there is an obligation on the government to take a certain action for the benefit of the larger good"

It is also sometimes used as a training post for a future higher level posting. For example, when Raghuram Rajan served as OSD in Union Finance Ministry before beginning the appointment for RBI Governor and also when S. Ranganathan was appointed the Comptroller and Auditor General, he was first appointed as an OSD to understudy the outgoing CAG A.K. Roy and subsequently given charge.

== Pakistan and Bangladesh ==
In Bangladesh and Pakistan, it refers to a higher civil service officer with no assigned duties. While some promotions are due to political reasons, others are made because of an absence of a suitable post. Certain officers view it as a "punishment" against a political view they had expressed. It implies that the government does not have any suitable post for the officer, but the officers are paid full salaries. It is considered to be a stigma when an officer is designated as the OSD.
