= Ministry of Personnel, Public Grievances and Pensions =

Government ministry of India

- Branch of Government of India

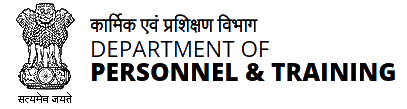

Agency overview
- Formed: March 1985; 41 years ago
- Jurisdiction: Government of India
- Headquarters: Kartavya Bhavan-03 Janpath, New Delhi
- Minister responsible: Narendra Modi, Prime Minister of India and Minister of Personnel, Public Grievances and Pensions
- Deputy Minister responsible: Jitendra Singh, Minister of State for Personnel, Public Grievances and Pensions
- Agency executives: Rachna Shah, IAS, Personnel Secretary (India); Nivedita Shukla Verma ,IAS, Secretary (Pension, Administrative Reforms and Grievances)
- Website: https://persmin.gov.in/

The Ministry of Personnel, Public Grievances and Pensions is a ministry of the Government of India in personnel matters specially issues concerning recruitment, training, career development, staff welfare as well as the post-retirement dispensation.

The ministry is also concerned with the process of responsive people-oriented modern administration. Allocation of Business Rules defines the work allotted for the ministry.

Usually, though not always, the ministry is headed by the prime minister, with a minister of state reporting to him.

== History ==
In 1954, on the recommendation of Paul H. Appleby report, an Organisation and Methods (O&M) Division was set up in the Cabinet Secretariat. In 1964, the O&M Division was transferred to the Ministry of Home Affairs, under the newly created Department of Administrative Reforms. In 1970, on the basis of the recommendations of the Administrative Reforms Commission, the Department of Personnel was set up in the Cabinet Secretariat. In 1973, the two departments were merged to form a Department of Personnel and Administrative Reforms in the Cabinet Secretariat. In 1977, the Department of Personnel and Administrative Reforms was transferred to the Ministry of Home Affairs. And, in 1985, a full-fledged ministry was created with the name Ministry of Personnel, Public Grievances and Pensions with three separate departments under it:

- Department of Personnel and Training (this also includes recruitment of officers through UPSC and SSC)
- Department of Administrative Reforms and Public Grievances
- Department of Pensions and Pensioners’ Welfare

== Departments ==
The ministry comprises three departments viz:-

- Department of Personnel and Training
- Department of Pension and Pensioners' Welfare
- Department of Administrative Reforms & Public Grievances

=== Department of Personnel and Training ===
DOPT is concerned with the formulation of policy and the watchdog of the Government ensuring that certain accepted standards and norms, as laid down by it, are followed by all ministries/departments in the recruitment, regulation of service conditions and posting transfers and deputation of personnel as well as other related issues.

It solely controls the cadres of the Indian Administrative Service (IAS) and the Central Secretariat Service (CSS).

==== Organisations ====
DOPT supervises and controls the following organisations, namely —

- Staff Selection Commission (SSC)
- Public Enterprises Selection Board (PESB)
- Lal Bahadur Shastri National Academy of Administration (LBSNAA)
- Institute of Secretariat Training and Management (ISTM)
- Central Bureau of Investigation (CBI)
- Indian Institute of Public Administration (IIPA)
- Central Information Commission (CIC)
- Capacity Building Commission (CBC)
- Grih Kalyan Kendra, a registered society (GKK)

==== Wings ====
- Establishment Officer’s (EO) Wing
- Services & Vigilance (S&V) Wing
- Personnel Policy Wing
- Administrative Tribunal, Internal Regulations & Welfare Administration Wing
- Training Wing
- Central Secretariat Wing

=== Department of Pension and Pensioners' Welfare ===
The department is mainly concerned with the formulation of policies regarding the post-retirement benefits of Central Government employees covered under the CCS (Pension) Rules, 1972. It also administers various welfare schemes for central government pensioners, i.e., redressal for Pensioners' grievances through CPENGRAM, an online pension sanction module for civil pensioners "Bhavishya", Sankalp, etc., under the umbrella of Pensioners' Portal. However, the pensioners of Ministries of Railways and Defence are governed by their respective pension rules.

=== Department of Administrative Reforms and Public Grievances ===
The Department of Administrative Reforms and Public Grievances (DARPG) is to facilitate the pursuit of excellence in governance through the promotion of:

- Improvements in Government structures and processes
- Citizen-friendly initiatives including redressal of public grievances
- Documentation, incubation and dissemination of best practices
- Codification and simplification of procedures and
- Networking with various agencies

The department acts as a facilitator, in consultation with central ministries/departments, states/UT administrations, organisations and individuals, to improve government functioning through administrative reforms in the spheres of restructuring the government, process improvement, organisation and methods and grievance handling, and by promoting modernization, Citizen's Charters, award schemes, e-governance, and best practices.

It provides online grievance redress services through Centralised Public Grievance Redress and Monitoring System (CPGRMS).

== Ministers ==
The Minister of Personnel, Public Grievances and Pensions is the cabinet minister in charge of Ministry of Personnel, Public Grievances and Pensions. The position is generally held by the prime minister, but sometimes it has been held by other senior members of the cabinet, such as Minister of Home Affairs. The minister is generally assisted by a minister of state. The position is considered to be a powerful one as of Personnel, Public Grievances and Pensions is the cadre controlling authority of the Indian Administrative Service, Central Secretariat Service and is the administering agency of the Central Bureau of Investigation (CBI) and the Public Enterprises Selection Board (PESB).
