= Maulana Azad National Urdu University =

Central university in Hyderabad, Telangana, India

- Type: Public
- Established: 1998; 28 years ago
- Affiliations: UGC, NAAC, AIU, AICTE
- Chancellor: Sri Madhukarnath
- Vice-Chancellor: Syed Ainul Hasan
- Visitor: President of India
- Students: Approx. 7000 (campus)
- Location: Hyderabad, Telangana, India; 17.4267669°N 78.3602534°E
- Campus: Urban, 200 acres
- Website: manuu.edu.in

Maulana Azad National Urdu University is a Central University located in the city of Hyderabad in the Indian state of Telangana. It was named after Maulana Abul Kalam Azad, India's first Minister of Education, a freedom fighter in India's struggle for independence, and a scholar of Islam and Urdu literature. It was the only Urdu university in India until the Dr. Abdul Haq Urdu University was established in Kurnool, Andhra Pradesh in 2016.

== Campus ==
The university was established by an Act of the Parliament in January 1998, with an All India jurisdiction to promote and develop the Urdu language and to impart vocational and technical Education in Urdu medium through conventional and distance modes. The university has been awarded "A+" Grade by National Assessment & Accreditation Council (NAAC).

The university's headquarter at Gachibowli houses buildings for Administration, School of Languages, Linguistics and Indology, School of Education and Training, School of Arts and Social Sciences, School of Mass Communication and Journalism, School of Computer Science & Information Technology, Saiyid Hamid Library, Polytechnic, ITI, UGC-Human Resource Development Centre; Instructional Media Center; Directorate of Distance Education(DDE); Center for Women Studies; Center for Urdu Language; Literature and Culture; Center for Professional Development of Urdu Medium Teachers; Al-Beruni Centre for the study of Social Exclusion and Inclusive Policy; H.K Sherwani Center for Deccan studies and others.

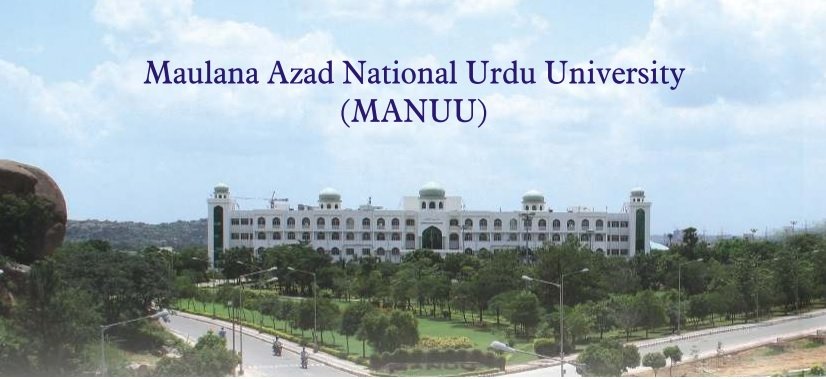

The University has a satellite campus in Lucknow and a campus at Srinagar (Jammu and Kashmir). There are Colleges of Teacher Education in Bhopal, Darbhanga, Srinagar, Aurangabad, Sambhal, Asansol, Nuh, Bidar which are guided through School of Education and Training. The University runs five Polytechnic Colleges in Bengaluru, Darbhanga, Hyderabad, Cuttack and Kadapa; four ITIs in Bengaluru, Darbhanga, Hyderabad and Cuttack; and three Urdu Model Schools in Darbhanga, Hyderabad and Nuh (Meewat).

== Organisation and administration ==
=== Governance ===
Shri Mumtaz Ali alias Sri Madhukarnath has been appointed as the new Chancellor of the Maulana Azad National Urdu University, Hyderabad by the Visitor in his capacity as the Visitor of the University under statute 1(1) & 2 of the Statutes of the University framed under the MANUU Act effective from 17 December 2021 for a period of three years.

Past Chancellors of MANUU Hyderabad: (1) Shri Inder Kumar Gujral, former Prime Minister of India (24.05.1999 to 23.05.2002) (2) Prof. Obaid Siddiqui, an eminent scientist (26.05.2005 to 25.05.2008) (3) Dr. Syeda Saiyidain Hameed, former Member, Planning Commission of India (for two terms from 09.07.2008 to 08.07.2011 & 09.07.2011 to 08.07.2014) (4) Shri Zafar Sareshwala, an Industrialist (01.01.2015 to 31.12.2017) (5) Shri Firoz Bakht Ahmed, an educationist (17.05.2018 to 16.05.2021)

=== Schools and Departments ===
The Regular mode programs are imparted through 8 School of Studies

1. Languages, Linguistics & Indology
2. Commerce & Business Management
3. Mass Communication & Journalism
4. Computer Science & Information Technology
5. Arts & Social Sciences
6. Education & Training
7. Sciences
8. Law

The Departments under the 8 Schools of studies are:

School of Languages, Linguistics & Indology

1. Department of Arabic
2. Department of English
3. Department of Hindi
4. Department of Persian
5. Department of Urdu
6. Department of Translation studies

School of Commerce & Business Management

1. Department of Management and Commerce

School of Mass Communication & Journalism

1. Department of Journalism & Mass Communication

School of Technology

1. Department of Computer Science & Information Technology

School of Arts & Social Sciences

1. Department of Islamic Studies
2. Department of Economics
3. Department of History
4. Department of Political Science
5. Department of Public Administration
6. Department of Sociology
7. Department of Social Work
8. Department of Women Education

School of Education & Training

1. Department of Education & Training

School of Sciences

1. Department of Mathematics

The Departments are currently offering 84 programs and courses, (25 PhD; 21 PG; 10 UG, 05 PG Diploma and 05 Diploma programs and 2 Certificate courses.

== Academics ==
=== Faculties ===
The university is home to the Maulana Azad Library, which was established in 1998. The library subscribes to 27 periodicals in Urdu, 129 in English, nine in Hindi and 40 popular magazines apart from 13 newspapers in Urdu, English, Telugu and Hindi.

The Centre for Urdu Language, Literature & Culture is associated with the university.

=== Memorial lecture ===
Vice-President Hamid Ansari delivered the first Mohammed Quli Qutub Shah memorial lecture at Maulana Azad Urdu University.

== Notable alumni ==
- Ishtiaque Ahmad Qasmi
- Muhammad Azam Nadwi
- Muhammadullah Khalili Qasmi
- Omar Abedeen Qasmi Madani
- Sanjiv Saraf

== See also ==
- Education in India
- Literacy in India
- List of institutions of higher education in Telangana
