= Atiqur Rahman Usmani =

Indian Muslim scholar (1901–1984)

Mawlānā, Mufti Atīqur Rahmān Usmānī

President of All India Muslim Majlis-e-Mushawarat
- Preceded by: Syed Mahmud
- Succeeded by: Sheikh Zulfiqarullah

Personal details
- Born: 1901 Deoband, British India
- Died: 12 May 1984 (aged 82–83) Delhi, India
- Resting place: Mehdiyan
- Parent: Azizur Rahman Usmani (father)
- Relatives: Usmani family of Deoband

Religious life
- Religion: Islam
- Founder of: Nadwatul Musannifeen, All India Muslim Majlis-e-Mushawarat

Atīqur Rahmān Usmānī (1901 – 12 May 1984) was an Indian Muslim scholar and an activist of Indian independence movement who co-founded Nadwatul Musannifeen and the All India Muslim Majlis-e-Mushawarat.

Usmānī was an alumnus of the Darul Uloom Deoband. He taught at Deoband seminary and the Jamia Islamia Talimuddin in Dabhel. He served as the president of All India Muslim Majlis-e-Mushawarat.

== Biography ==
Atiqur Rahman Usmānī was born in 1901 in Deoband. His father Azizur Rahman Usmani was the Grand Mufti of Darul Uloom Deoband. He graduated from Darul Uloom Deoband where he studied under Anwar Shah Kashmiri.

Usmānī began teaching at the Darul Uloom Deoband and practiced "fatwa" under the supervision of his father and later became the deputy-Mufti. He then briefly taught at the Jamia Islamia Talimuddin. In 1938, Usmāni established Nadwatul Musannifeen along with Hamid al-Ansari Ghazi, Hifzur Rahman Seoharwi and Saeed Ahmad Akbarabadi.

Usmānī was a close associate of Hifzur Rahman Seoharwi and served as the working president of Jamiat Ulama-e-Hind after the death of Ahmad Saeed Dehlvi. He disassociated himself from the Jamiat Ulama-e-Hind in 1963 and a year later, in 1964, he co-founded the All India Muslim Majlis-e-Mushawarat and became its president after Syed Mahmud.

Usmānī died on 12 May 1984 in Delhi. He was buried in Mehdiyan, near the grave of Shah Waliullah Dehlawi.

== Activism ==
Usmāni participated in the Indian freedom struggle and gave a religious verdict saying that no government has any right to impose taxes on items like water and salt and if any government does so, it is necessary for the people to oppose this action and to struggle against it.

== Literary works ==
Usmāni translated and annotated Al-Kalim al-Tayyib of Ibn Taymiyah into Urdu. At Nadwatul Musannifeen, he started a monthly journal, Burhan.

== Bibliography ==
- Muhammad Tayyib, Qari. Bukhari, Akbar Shah (ed.). 50 Misaali Shaksiyaat [50 Exemplar personalities] (in Urdu) (July 1999 ed.). Deoband: Maktaba Faiz-ul-Qur'an. pp. 110–113.
- Mehdi, Jameel (ed.). Mufakkir-e-Millat Number, Burhan (in Urdu) (November 1987 ed.). Delhi: Nadwatul Musannifeen.
