= Hamid al-Ansari Ghazi =

Indian Muslim scholar (1909–1992)

Mawlāna Hāmid al-Ansāri Ghāzi

Personal life
- Born: 1909 Ambehta, Saharanpur, British India
- Died: 16 October 1992 (aged 82–83) Mumbai, India
- Children: Abidullah Ghazi (son)
- Parent: Muhammad Mian Mansoor Ansari (father)
- Notable work(s): Islām ka Nizām-e-Hukūmat, Khulq-e-Azeem
- Education: Darul Uloom Deoband, Jamia Islamia Talimuddin and the University of the Punjab
- Known for: editing Madina

Religious life
- Religion: Islam
- Founder of: Nadwatul Musannifeen

Hāmid al-Ansāri Ghāzi (1909 – 16 October 1992) was an Indian Muslim scholar, author and a journalist, who co-founded the Nadwatul Musannifeen and served as the editor of bi-weekly newspaper Madina. He was the son of Muhammad Mian Mansoor Ansari and an alumnus of the Darul Uloom Deoband, Jamia Islamia Talimuddin and University of the Punjab. He was a member of the executive council of Darul Uloom Deoband and authored books such as Islām ka Nizām-e-Hukūmat and Khulq-e-Azeem.

== Biography ==
Hāmid al-Ansāri Ghāzi was born 1909 in Ambehta, Saharanpur. His father Muhammad Mian Mansoor Ansari was one of the major leaders of the Silk Letter Movement. Ghazi completed his primary studies under the guidance of his maternal grandfather Siddiq Ahmad Anbethvi. He studied at the Darul Uloom Deoband and Jamia Islamia Talimuddin between 1922 and 1927. He was one of the major students of Anwar Shah Kashmiri. He passed the "munshi" and "fazil" exams from University of the Punjab.

Ghazi contributed to the Al-Jamiyat of Jamiat Ulama-e-Hind for three years and then became the editor of Madina, a Bijnor-based newspaper. He associated with Tajwar Najībābadi's Naqqād for sometime and then established Nadwatul Musannifeen along with Atiq-ur-Rahman Usmani, Hifzur Rahman Seoharwi and Saeed Ahmad Akbarabadi. Meanwhile, he served as the editor for Nida-e-Haram, a Mecca based magazine, at the request of Muhammad Saleem Muhajir Makki, the rector of Madrasah as-Sawlatiyah. In 1942, he again joined Madina, and remained associated with it for five years. He moved to Bombay in 1950, where he edited the Jamhuriyat, a daily newspaper published by Jamiat Ulama-e-Maharashtra. He discontinued editing this newspaper after it was renamed Gufira-lahu (غفرلہ) in 1956. He then started a new paper on his own, Jamhuriyat, using the same name.

Ghazi was appointed a member of the executive council of Darul Uloom Deoband in 1382 AH. He died in Bombay on 16 October 1992.

== Literary works ==
Ghāzi's books include:

- Islām ka Nizām-e-Hukūmat
- Khulq-e-Azeem
- Ṣad sālah yādgār: 1857 se 1957 tak Hindūstān kī jang-i āzādī men̲ musalmānon̲ ke k̲h̲ūn kā ḥiṣṣah

== Personal life ==
Ghāzi was married to Hajira Nazli, the daughter of Muhammad Tayyib Qasmi. Nazli is an author of twenty Urdu novels. Indo-American author and educationist Abidullah Ghazi is their son.

== See also ==
- List of Deobandis
