= Zayn al-Abidin Sajjad Meerthi =

Indian Islamic scholar (1910–1991)

- Born: 1910; Meerut, United Provinces of British India
- Died: 1991 (aged 80–81); Meerut, Uttar Pradesh

Academic background
- Education: Darul Uloom Deoband

Academic work
- Notable works: Tarikh-e-Millat

Religious life
- Religion: Islam
- Jurisprudence: Hanafi

Muslim leader
- Disciple of: Abdul Mumin Deobandi

Zayn al-Abidin Sajjad Meerthi (also written as Qazi Zainul Abideen Sajjad Meerthi) (1910–1991) was an Indian Sunni Muslim scholar and historian and head of the Islamic studies department of Jamia Millia Islamia. His book Tarikh-e-Millat is required reading in the syllabus of Darul Uloom Deoband and in madrasas affiliated with it.

== Biography ==
Zayn al-Abidin Sajjad Meerthi was born in 1910 in Meerut, United Provinces of British India. He was schooled at Darul Uloom Meerut and Madrasa Imdad al-Islam in Meerut. He graduated in Arabic literature from Allahabad University and specialized in ahadith at Darul Uloom Deoband under Anwar Shah Kashmiri and Hussain Ahmad Madani in 1346 AH. He was a disciple of Abdul Mumin Deobandi, who was Mahmud Hasan Deobandi's brother-in-law.

At Tajwar Najibabadi's request, Meerthi became joint editor of Najibabadi's journal Adabi Dunya. He later joined Nadwatul Musannifeen, a publishing house established by Atiqur Rahman Usmani along with Saeed Ahmad Akbarabadi and Hifzur Rehman Seoharwi in Delhi in 1938. Meerthi joined Jamia Millia Islamia as a professor of History and exegesis at the request of its former Vice Chancellor, Mohammad Mujeeb. He was a member of the executive council of Jamiat Ulama-e-Hind, the administrative council of Nadwatul Ulama, Lucknow and Aligarh Muslim University's Theology faculty. He published Al-Haram, a monthly journal from Meerut, from 1957 to 1964. He was a member of the governing body of Darul Uloom Deoband from 1962 until his death. Meerthi died in 1991 in Meerut, Uttar Pradesh.

== Literary works ==
Meerthi's books include:

- Tarikh-e-Millat, 3 volumes namely Nabi al-Arabi, Khilafat-e-Rashida and Khilafat Banu Umayyah
- Bayan al-Lisan
- Qamoos al-Quran
- Intikhab-e-Sihah Sitta
- Sirat-e-Tayyibah
- Shaheed-e-Karbala
- Arabi Bol Chaal
- Nabi arabi
