= Nadwatul Musannifeen =

Indian research institution

- Nadwatul Musannifeen during 1987
- Status: defunct
- Founded: 1938
- Founders: Atiqur Rahman Usmani; Hamid al-Ansari Ghazi; Hifzur Rahman Seoharwi; Saeed Ahmad Akbarabadi

Nadwatul Musannifeen (English: Council of Writers) was an academic research institution and publishing house in Delhi. The institution was co-founded by scholars including Atiqur Rahman Usmani, Hamid al-Ansari Ghazi, Hifzur Rahman Seoharwi and Saeed Ahmad Akbarabadi in 1938.

== History ==
Nadwatul Musannifeen was established by Atiqur Rahman Usmani, Hamid al-Ansari Ghazi, Hifzur Rahman Seoharwi and Saeed Ahmad Akbarabadi in 1938. Originally set up in Karol Bagh, the institution suffered losses during 1947 riots. It was moved to nearby Jama Masjid, Delhi post the Partition of India by Atiqur Rahman Usmani.

The institution has published books on issues related to religion, history, culture and theology. The institution published Burhan, a magazine that is regarded as the best Islamiyat magazine after the Al-Ma'ārif of Shibli Academy.

== Associated scholars ==
- Muhammad Taqi Amini
- Zayn al-Abidin Sajjad Meerthi

== Publications ==
The Nadwatul Musannifeen has published more than 250 books including:

Books related to Quran and Tafsir
Book	Author	References
Akhbār-ut-Tanzeel	Ismail Sambhali	
Al-Fauzul Kabīr fi Usūl it-Tafsīr (Urdu translation)	Shah Waliullah, Abdul Rasheed Ansari	
Al-Basā'ir	Abd al-Hayy Farooqi	
Tadween-e-Qur'an	Manazir Ahsan Gilani	
Tafsir al-Mazhari	Qadi Thanaullah Panipati	
Fehm-e-Qur'an	Saeed Ahmad Akbarabadi	
Lughat al-Quran	Abdul Rasheed Nomani	
Hikmat al-Qur'ān	Muhammad Taqi Amini	
Qasas al-Qur'ān	Hifzur Rahman Seoharwi	

Books related to Hadith sciences
Book	Author	References
Tarjuman al-Sunnah	Badre Alam Merathi	
Uswa-e-Hasanah	Zafeeruddin Miftahi	
Kitab-e-Hadees	Minnatullah Rahmani	
Hadees ka dirāyati meyār	Muhammad Taqi Amini	
Ma'āsr-o-Ma'ārif	Qazi Athar Mubarakpuri	

Books related to Islamic history
Book	Author	References
Āsār-o-Akhbār	Qazi Athar Mubarakpuri	
Tārikh-e-Millat (volume 1 to 3)	Zayn al-Abidin Sajjad Meerthi	
Tārikh-e-Millat (volume 4 to volume 11)	Intizamullah Shehbai	
Tārikh-e-Tabari ke Ma'ākhaz ka tanqīdi mutāla	Nisar Ahmed Faruqi	
Tārikhi Maqālāt	K. A. Nizami	
Tahzeeb ki tashkīl-e-jadīd	Muhammad Taqi Amini	
MusalmānoN ki firqa-bandiyoN ka afsāna	Manazir Ahsan Gilani	
Sarkashi-e-Zila Bijnor	Syed Ahmad Khan	
Ulama-e-Hind ka shāndār māzi	Muhammad Miyan Deobandi	
Hindustān mai ArboN ki hakūmateN	Qazi Athar Mubarakpuri	

Books related to Sufism
Book	Author	References
Imdād al-Mushtāq	Ashraf Ali Thanwi	
Tārikh Mashāyikh-e-Chisht	K. A. Nizami	

Books on other topics
Book	Author	References
Islām ka Nizām-e-Hukūmat	Hamid al-Ansari Ghazi	
Islām ka nizām-e-masājid	Zafeeruddin Miftahi	
Urooj-o-Zawāl ka ilāhi nizām	Muhammad Taqi Amini	
Hayāt Abd al-Hayy	Abul Hasan Ali Hasani Nadwi	
Tālimāt-e-Islāmi awr Masīhi aqwām	Muhammad Tayyib Qasmi	

== Legacy ==
At the Jamia Millia Islamia, Abdul Waris Khan wrote a doctoral thesis entitled Islāmi Uloom mai Nadwatul Musannifeen ki Khidmāt: Ek mutāla, (transl. The contribution of Nadwatul Musannifeen in Islamic studies: A study).

== Bibliography ==
- Khan, Abdul Waris (1999). Islāmi Uloom mai Nadwatul Musannifeen ki Khidmāt: Ek mutāla [The contribution of Nadwatul Musannifeen in Islamic studies: A study]. New Delhi: Islamic Book Foundation.
