= Syed Shamaele Nabi =

Indian politician

Syed Shamaele Nabi was an Indian politician from Bihar. He had served as a member of the Bihar Legislative Assembly from Keoti Assembly constituency from 1980 to 1985 and had also served as the minister of state for health and PRD. He had been the chairman of Urdu Pragati Samiti, Bihar and the president of Friends of Soviet Union, Bihar Branch. He was the founder of Rahrau, an Urdu weekly published from Patna since 1969. He was the Bihar State President of All India Muslim Majlis-e-Mushawarat.
