= A. S. Arya =

Indian structural engineer (1931–2019)

- Born: 13 June 1931; Ambehta, Saharanpur District, Uttar Pradesh, India
- Died: 1 September 2019 (aged 88); Ghaziabad, Uttar Pradesh
- Resting place: New Delhi
- Education: University of Roorkee; University of Illinois at Urbana–Champaign
- Occupation: Structural Engineer
- Years active: Since 1961
- Known for: Earthquake engineering Disaster management
- Awards: Padma Shri; Khosla National Award; ISET Jai Krishna Award; FICCI Award; IE (I) National Design Award; United Nations Sasakawa Disaster Prevention Award; Disaster Mitigation Award

Anand Swarup Arya (1931-2019) was an Indian structural engineer, known for his expertise in the soil and foundation engineering and earthquake disaster management. He is a former chairman of the Bureau of Indian Standards (BIS) Committee on Earthquake Engineering and a recipient of the United Nations Sasakawa Disaster Prevention Award of 1997. The Government of India awarded him the Padma Shri, the country’s fourth-highest civilian honour, in 2002.

== Biography ==
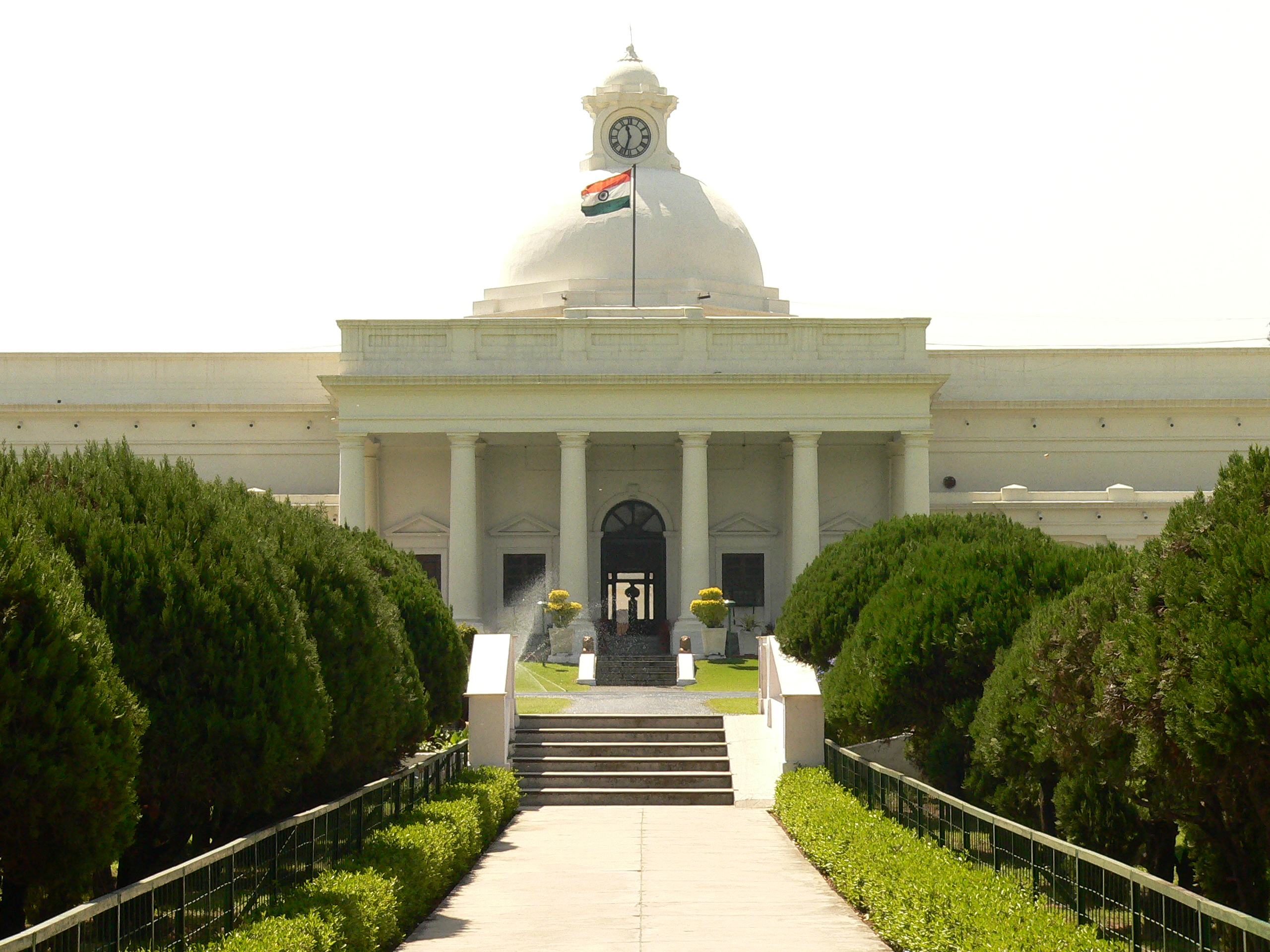
Administrative Building IIT-Roorkee

Arya was born in a small Uttar Pradesh village of Ambehta in Saharanpur district on 13 June 1931 and secured his graduate degree (BE) in civil engineering and master's degree (ME) in Structural engineering (1954) from University of Roorkee (present-day Indian Institute of Technology, Roorkee). Joining the University of Illinois at Urbana–Champaign in 1959, he secured a doctoral degree in 1961. He started his career as a member of faculty at the University of Roorkee where he served for 36 years till his superannuation 1989. During his career, he rose in ranks to become a professor and the head of the department of Earthquake Engineering and finally, the Pro-vice chancellor of the university. After his retirement, he was made the Emeritus Professor of the Indian Institute of Technology, Roorkee.

== Legacy ==
As the head of the faculty of Earthquake engineering at IIT Roorkee, Arya started many courses in the subject at the institution as well as other institutions in India and founded an interdisciplinary Department of Earthquake Engineering in the IIT. His contributions are reported in the development of new methods and structural designs suited for small and larger buildings, bridges, reservoirs and atomic power plants. He has conducted training classes in structural designing in India as well as other countries such as Yugoslavia, Japan, Thailand, Philippines, Afghanistan and Nepal.

Arya is one of the founders of the Indian Society of Earthquake Technology, along with the renowned engineer, Jai Krishna. He has guided 71 research scholars in their master's and doctoral studies. He has served as the director of the International Association of Earthquake Engineering during 1977-80 and 1980–84 and has been a consultant to United Nations agencies such as UNESCO, United Nations Human Settlements Programme (UNCHS) and United Nations Centre for Regional Development (UNCRD) as well as the World Bank. He is a former chairman of the Committee on CED 39 on Earthquake Engineering Codes of the Bureau of Indian Standards and a sitting member of the Bihar State Disaster Management Authority (BSDMA). He has been National Seismic Advisor of the United Nations Development Program (UNDP) sponsored Earthquake Vulnerability Reduction Programme and headed the National Seismic Zoning Committee. Arya has published three books, Guidelines for Earthquake Resistant Non-engineered Construction, Masonry & Timber Structures Including Earthquake Resistant Design and Earthquake Disaster Reduction: Masonry Building, Design, and Construction on structural design and earthquake-resistant construction techniques. He is also the founder of Anand Swaroop Arya Saraswati Vidya Mandir, Roorkee school. In this school, he wants the students to gain knowledge of Indian culture and sacraments. He has also co-authored Design of Steel Structures along with J. L. Ajmani and Response of Arches Under Earthquake Excitation with S. K. Thakkar.

== Awards and honours ==
Arya is an elected Fellow of the Indian National Academy of Engineering (INAE) and the Institution of Engineers (India). The Indian Institute of Technology, Roorkee awarded him the annual research award, Khosla National Award, in 1980 and he received the Jai Krishna Award of the Indian Society of Earthquake Technology in 1982. The FICCI award of the Federation of Indian Chamber of Commerce and Industry reached him in 1986, followed by the National Design Award of the Institution of Engineers (India), the next year. The United Nations honoured him with the Sasakawa Disaster Prevention Award in 1997. The Government of India included him in the 2002 Republic Day honours list for the Padma Shri, India’s fourth-highest civilian award. The National Institute of Disaster Management, an autonomous body under the Ministry of Home Affairs, awarded him the Disaster Mitigation Award in 2006.

== Bibliography ==
- A. S. Arya, J. L. Ajmani (1964). Design of Steel Structures. Nemchand. p. 888.
- A. S. Arya, S. K. Thakkar (1972). Response of Arches Under Earthquake Excitation. University of Roorkee.
- A. S. Arya (1986). Guidelines for Earthquake Resistant Non-engineered Construction. International Association for Earthquake Engineering. p. 158.
- A. S. Arya (2006). Masonry & Timber Structures Including Earthquake Resistant Design. Sterling Books. ISBN 9788185240053.
- A. S. Arya (2007). Earthquake Disaster Reduction : Masonry Building, Design, and Construction. National Institute of Disaster Management, KW Publishers. ISBN 9788187966500.

== See also ==
- Indian Institute of Technology Roorkee
