= Abidullah Ghazi =

Muslim writer (1936–2021)

Abidullah al-Ansari Ghazi
- अबिदुल्लाह ग़ाज़ी
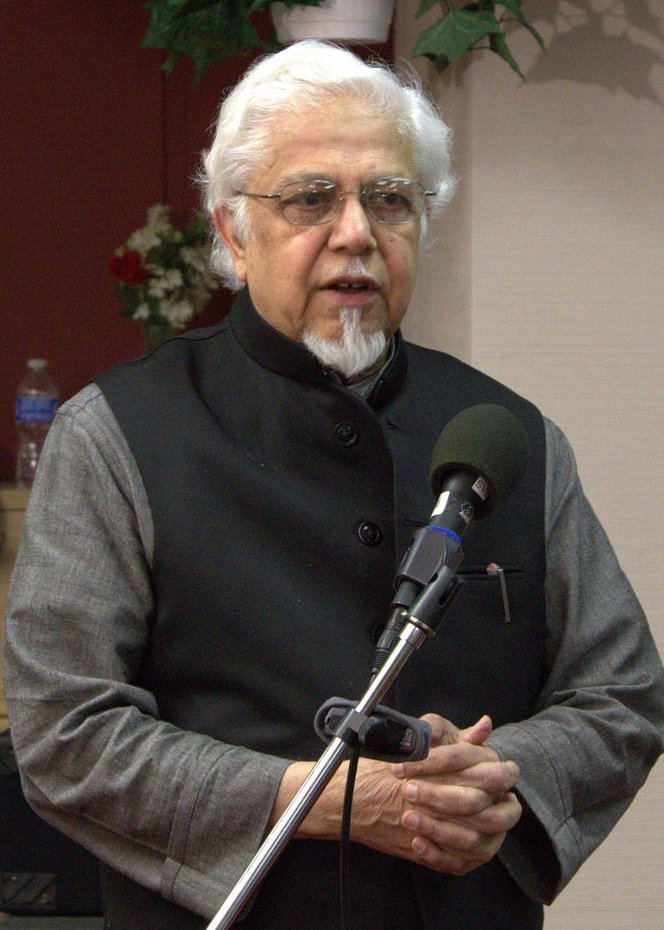
- Born: 6 July 1936; Ambehta, United Provinces, British India
- Died: 11 April 2021 (aged 84)
- Occupations: Executive director, IQRA International Educational Foundation
- Spouse: Tasneema Ghazi
- Father: Hamid al-Ansari Ghazi
- Relatives: Muhammad Mian Mansoor Ansari (paternal grandfather), Qari Muhammad Tayyib (maternal grandfather), Muhammad Qasim Nanautavi (great grandfather)
- Website: www.iqra.org

Abidullah Ansari Ghazi (Hindi: अबिदुल्लाह ग़ाज़ी) (6 July 1936 – 11 April 2021) was an Indian American author, educator and poet. He authored more than 140 Islamic educational textbooks for children. He was also the executive director of IQRA International Educational Foundation.

His books have been translated into many languages and are part of the curriculum of Islamic schools in more than 40 countries. He was named by the Royal Islamic Strategic Studies Centre as being among the "500 Most Influential Muslims in the World."

== Early life and career ==
Abidullah Ghazi was born in the northern Indian town of Ambehta Saharanpur district on 6 July 1936.

Abidullah Ghazi received his master's degree from Aligarh Muslim University in 1959, MSc from the London School of Economics in 1967 and his PhD degree from Harvard University in 1973. Ghazi died on 11 April 2021, at the age of 84.

== Social and educational services ==
1. Founder-Director, Iqra International Educational Foundation (1983)
2. Chairman Board of Trustees (2005–06), The Federation of Aligarh Alumni Associations
3. President, National Council of University Students of India (1959)
4. President, Aligarh Muslim University Students' Union (1959)
5. Honorary Secretary, AMU Students Union, 1954

== Advisor to ==
- Pandit Jawahar Lal Nehru, Prime Minister of India (1947–64)
- Rajendra Prasad, President of India (1950–62)
- Zakir Hussain, President of India (1967–69)

== Awards and recognition ==
- Sitara-i-Imtiaz (Star of Excellence) Award for Seeratun-Nabi Program, Pakistan (1983)
- Nishan-e-Imtiaz (Order of Excellence) Award for Development of Educational Curriculum, Pakistan (1988)

== Books ==
1. Sareer-e-Khama (Compilation of his personal articles)
2. Maulana Abdullah Ansari – Ahwaal, Khidmat aur Ilmi Asaar

Abidullah Ghazi founded Iqra' International Educational Foundation, in Skokie, Illinois, US in 1983 as a community project to teach American Muslim children about their faith.

Since then it has published nearly 100 textbooks and supplementary "enrichment" books of non-fiction, fiction and poetry. He now operates a book club and a bookshop there as well. The group linked itself with Iqra' Charitable Society in 1987. This group is still headed by Abidullah Ghazi. He and his wife, Tasneema Ghazi, were born in India, came to the United States for further studies and to earn higher degrees. Later they decided to settle down in the United States with their young children.

== Immigration to United States ==
It was while working on a project dealing with the ulama of India that he was brought to the attention of Professor Wilfred Cantwell Smith, who was the founder and director of the Center for the Study of World Religions at the Harvard Divinity School. Smith offered Ghazi a scholarship to come and complete a PhD degree in the study of religion. While studying at Harvard University, Ghazi pursued an interdisciplinary program combining political science with religious studies. He became a naturalized U.S. citizen in 1983. Ghazi has also taught and lectured in India and the United Kingdom.

== See also ==
- Muhammad Mian Mansoor Ansari
