= Faculty of Theology, Aligarh Muslim University =

College in the Aligarh Muslim University

Faculty of Theology धर्मशास्र संकाय
- Established: 1944
- Affiliations: Aligarh Muslim University
- Location: Aligarh, Uttar Pradesh, India

The Faculty of Theology is a part of Aligarh Muslim University. The faculty has two departments, Sunni Theology and Shia Theology.

== History ==
The Faculty of Theology is one of the oldest faculties of Aligarh Muslim University. Abdullah Ansari, son-in-law of Muhammad Qasim Nanotawi, the founder of Darul Uloom Deoband, was appointed first Nazime-e-Deeniyat.

Aligarh Muslim University is the only Indian university to have distinct departments for Sunni and Shia theology. These two departments not only provide teaching and research facilities but also manage the religious life of the campus. The two are regarded as a living manifestation of Sir Syed's vision of Muslim unity and brotherhood.

Abdul Lateef Rahmani, Syed Sulaiman Ashraf, Saeed Ahmad Akbarabadi, Ali Naqi Naqvi, Kazim Naqvi, Hafeezullah, Muhammad Taqi Amini, Mujtaba Hasan Kamoonpuri, Fazlur Rahman Ginnori, Kalbe Abid and other scholars have served in this faculty.

Historians including Zayn al-Abidin Sajjad Meerthi have been members of the faculty.

=== Role of Saeed Ahmad Akbarabadi ===
Saeed Ahmad Akbarabadi was appointed the dean of the Faculty of Theology in 1958. He transformed a mediocre faculty, both academically and administratively, and brought it on par with the other faculties of the university. His efforts introduced the faculty to postgraduate classes, PhD in the Faculty of Theology, is also the result of his efforts. Rizwanullah did his doctorate on Anwar Shah Kashmiri under him, and it was first ever PhD thesis Akbarabadi had supervised in AMU, it was published by the university in 1974.
