= Saeed Ahmad Akbarabadi =

Indian Islamic scholar (1908–1985)

Maulana Saeed Ahmad Akbarabadi

Personal life
- Born: 1908 Agra, United Provinces, British India
- Died: 24 May 1985 (aged 76–77) Karachi, Sindh, Pakistan
- Region: India
- Main interest(s): Urdu literature, history, Seerah
- Notable work(s): Fehm-e-Quran, Ghulaman-e-Islam, Siddiq-e-Akbar, Wahi Ilahi
- Education: Madrasa Shahi, Moradabad, Darul Uloom Deoband, Oriental College, Lahore, St. Stephen's College, Delhi

Religious life
- Religion: Islam
- Denomination: Sunni
- Founder of: Nadwatul Musannifeen
- Jurisprudence: Hanafi
- Movement: Deobandi

Muslim leader
- Influenced by: Anwar Shah Kashmiri

Saeed Ahmad Akbarabadi (1908 – 24 May 1985) was an Indian Islamic scholar and an Urdu-language author who co-founded the Nadwatul Musannifeen. He served as the dean of the Faculty of Theology in Aligarh Muslim University.

Akbarabadi was an alumnus of Jamia Qasmia Madrasa Shahi, Darul Uloom Deoband, St. Stephen's College, Delhi and the Oriental College, Lahore. He taught at Jamia Islamia Talimuddin, Madrassa-e-Aalia, Fatehpuri, Aligarh Muslim University, University of Calicut and the McGill University. He authored books including Fehm-e-Quran, Ghulaman-e-Islam, Siddiq-e-Akbar and Musalmano Ka Urooj-o-Zawal. His students include Muhammad Zia-ul-Haq and Mushir-ul-Haq.

== Birth and education ==
Saeed Ahmad Akbarabadi was born in the colonial Indian city of Agra in 1908. He studied his primary classes at home, then he studied in Jamia Qasmia Madrasa Shahi, and later graduated from the Darul Uloom Deoband. There he studied under Anwar Shah Kashmiri, Shabbir Ahmad Usmani and Ibrahim Balyawi. He then undertook specialist courses at Oriental College, Lahore. During the period, Akbarabadi was appointed as a teacher of oriental languages in Madrasa-e-Aaliya, Fatehpuri. He gained a Master of Arts degree in Arabic from St. Stephen's College, Delhi.

== Career ==
After completing studies at Oriental College, Lahore, Akbarabadi taught at Jamia Islamia Talimuddin, Dabhel. He then taught oriental languages in Madrassa-e-Aalia, Fatehpuri. After completing his M.A from St. Stephen's College, Delhi, he became a lecturer in the same college. In the meantime Muhammad Zia-ul-Haq (Former President of Pakistan) became his student. In 1938, Akbarabadi established Nadwatul Musannifeen along with Atiqur Rahman Usmani, Hamid al-Ansari Ghazi and Hifzur Rahman Seoharwi. He was offered principalship of the Madrasa Alia, in Calcutta, of which he took the charge on 2 February 1949.

In 1958, Akbarabadi became the dean of the Faculty of Theology in the Aligarh Muslim University. He transformed a weak faculty and introduced graduate teaching and a doctoral programme. He supervised his (and the faculty's) first doctoral thesis, on Anwar Shah Kashmiri, which was later published by Aligarh Muslim University in 1974.

During 1961 and 1963, Akbarabadi was invited by Wilfred Cantwell Smith to be a visiting professor in the Institute of Islamic Studies at the McGill University in Canada. His students at the institute included Mushir-ul-Haq, the former vice-chancellor of the University of Kashmir. He retired from the AMU in 1972.

After that, he was a visiting professor at the University of Calicut and then at Aligarh Muslim University. Darul Uloom Deoband then made him director of its new research department, Shaikhul Hind Academy, a post he held from 25 December 1982 until his death on 24 May 1985.

== Literary works ==
He began his writing journey with Da'watul Haq. His works include:

- Al-riq fi al-Islam
- Fehm-e-Quran
- Ghulaman-e-Islam
- Hindustan ki shar'i haisiyat
- Hind Pak̄istān kī taḥrīk-i āzādī aur ʻulamāʼe ḥaqq kā siyāsī muʼaqqaf
- K̲h̲ut̤bāt-i Iqbāl par ek naẓar
- Musalmano Ka Urooj-o-Zawal
- Siddiq-e-Akbar
- Maulana Ubaidullah Sindhi aur unke Naaqid
- Uthman Zinnurayn
- Wahi Ilahi

== Legacy ==
Studies of Akbarabadi include:

- Maulana Saeed Ahmad Akbarabadi: Ahwaal-Aasaar by Dr Masood Alam Qasmi
- Maulana Saeed Ahmad Akbarabadi: Hayat-o-Khidmat by Dr Qaiser Habeeb Hashmi
- Maulana Saeed Ahmad Akbarabadi aur unki Adbi Khidmat by Miss Jahan Ara (Thesis submitted in Punjab University, Lahore).

== See also ==
- Syed Mehboob Rizwi
- Muhammad Taqi Amini
