= Kalan Bazaar =

Kalan Bazaar کلاں بازار
- Bazaar
- Country: Pakistan
- Province: Punjab
- City: Rawalpindi

The Kalan Bazaar (Urdu: کلاں بازار) is a bazaar located in Rawalpindi. Before British Raj, it used to be a weaponry hub.

The bazaar now has garments, jewellery, electronics, flowers and shrouds.

== History ==
Kalan is a Persian word for 'big' – hence it's called 'Big Bazaar'.

Before independence of Pakistan in 1947, 'over 95% of the shops were then owned by Hindus and Sikhs, with Muslim owners making up a tiny percentage'. It was a vast marketplace of tented shops to protect the shopkeepers from the harsh sunlight of Punjab's summers. In the vicinity, there were dense forests on either side of this bazaar and the shopkeepers would move their merchandise under the shade of trees in extremely hot weather conditions.

When Rawalpindi was made a military cantonment under the British Raj in 1863, the shop owners were allowed to convert their makeshift stalls into concrete shops. Thereafter, the tented shops totally disappeared, but the 'Kalan Bazaar' name has stuck to this day.

The historical importance of Kalan Bazar was so great that President Richard Nixon, who came to Pakistan during the presidency of General Ayub Khan, paid a special visit to it.

In addition, the dignitaries like Quaid-e-Azam Muhammad Ali Jinnah, Fatima Jinnah, Zulfiqar Ali Bhutto, Khan Abdul Wali Khan, Mumtaz Daultana, Sardar Shaukat Hayat Khan, Ataullah Shah Bukhari, Mufti Mahmood, Shah Ahmad Noorani, Agha Shorish Kashmiri, Ghulam Ullah Khan, and Ehtisham ul Haq Thanvi took the time and made sure that they come to visit this important bazaar at different times after 1947.
