= Mehdiyan =

Cemetery in Delhi, India

- Interactive map of Mehdiyan

Details
- Location: to the left of Delhi Gate, Delhi
- Country: India
- Coordinates: 28°38′09″N 77°14′14″E
- Type: Muslim

Mehdiyan is a historic Muslim cemetery located behind Maulana Azad Medical College in Delhi. Several notable figures have been buried there, including Islamic scholar Shah Waliullah, his father Shah Abdur Rahim, Urdu poet Momin Khan Momin, and Indian freedom fighter and Islamic scholar Hifzur Rahman Seoharwi.

The site is also home to the Madrasah-i Rahimiyah, established by Shah Abdur Rahim. The institution blended rational sciences and traditional Islamic sciences, and drew students "from far and wide."

== Notable interments ==
- Atiqur Rahman Usmani
- Hifzur Rahman Seoharwi
- Mamluk Ali Nanautawi
- Momin Khan Momin
- Shah Abdul Aziz Dehlavi
- Shah Abdur Rahim
- Shah Waliullah Dehlawi
- Sikander Bakht, politician
- Yunus Dehlvi, editor of Shama magazine
