= Madrasa Aminia =

Islamic seminary in India

Coordinates: 28.663564°N 77.230319°E

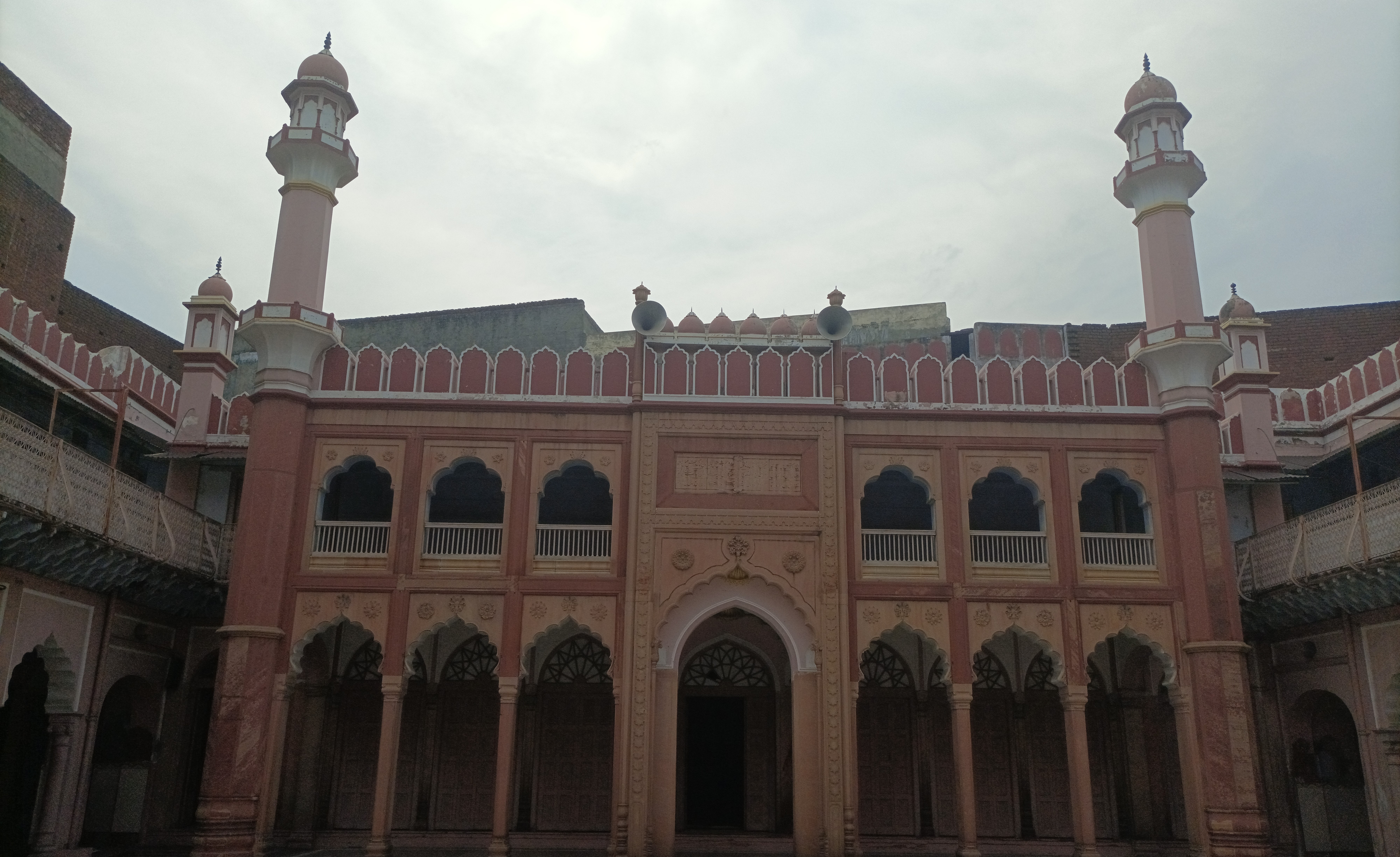
- A view of Madrasa Aminia
- Type: Islamic university
- Established: 1897 (129 years ago)
- Founder: Amin al-Din Dehlawi
- Rector: Hafiz Rasheed
- Location: Kashmiri Gate, Old Delhi, India

Madrasa Aminia Islamia Arabia (best known as Madrasa Aminia) is an Islamic seminary in Old Delhi, Delhi.

== History ==
Amin al-Din Dehlawi, an Islamic scholar who was a student of Mahmud Hasan Deobandi, developed an idea of establishing a madrasa in Delhi. He discussed his idea with his fellow Kifayatullah Dehlawi and invited him to support. Kifayatullah declined the offer stating that he was already occupied teaching at a religious school of his teacher Ubayd al-Haq Khan in Shahjahanpur. He however suggested Amīn to consider Anwar Shah Kashmiri for this purpose. Amīn reached to Anwar Shah Kashmiri who supported his idea and the Madrasa Aminia was established at Sunehri Masjid, in Chandni Chowk in 1897. The madrasa was shifted to Kashmiri Gate in 1917.

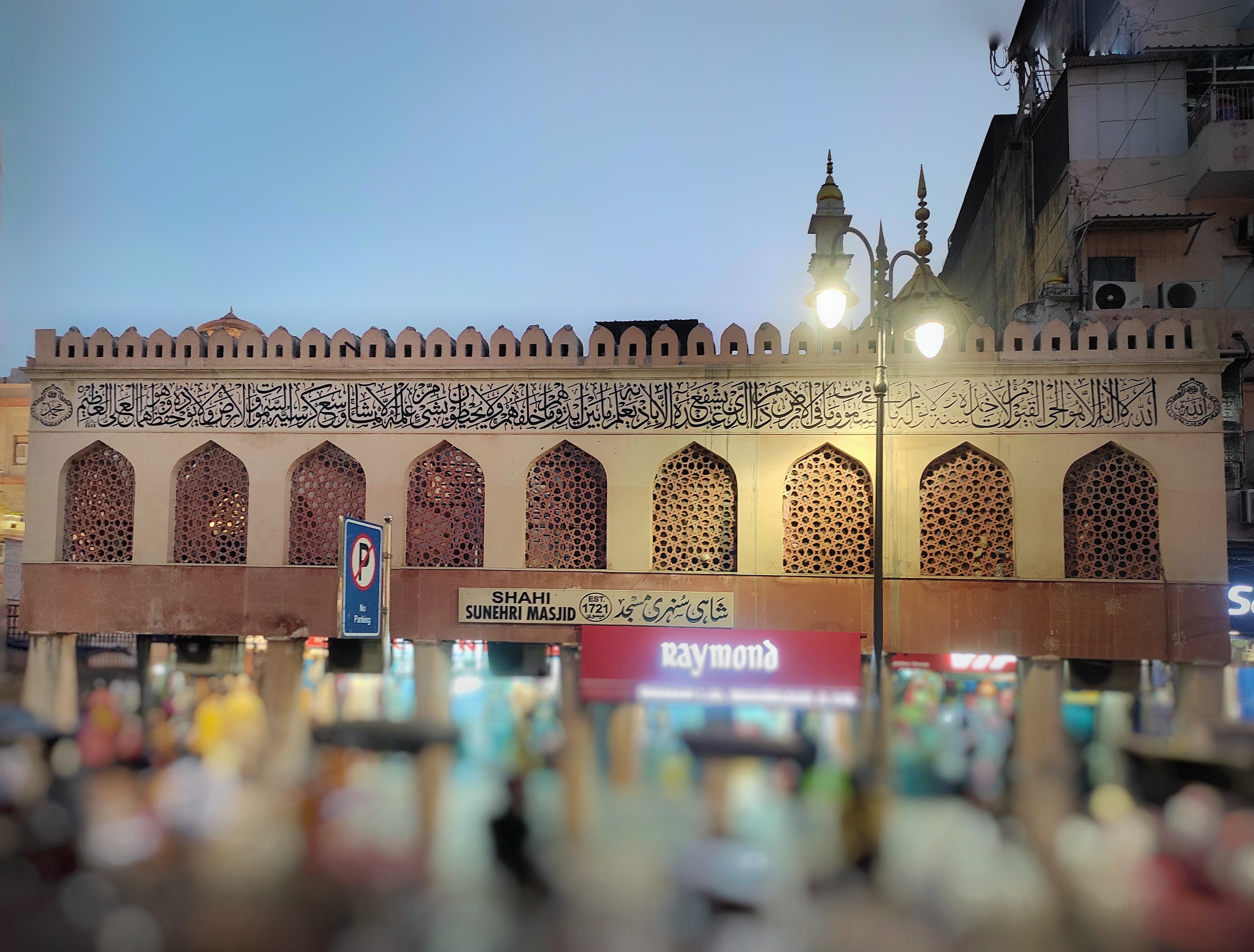
Shahi Sunheri Masjid, Chandni Chowk, Delhi

Amīn al-Din Dehlawi served as the rector of Madrasa Aminia from the date of its inception in 1897 until his death in 1919. Following Amin's death, Mahmud Hasan Deobandi appointed Kifayatullah Dehlawi the second rector, who served the position until his death in 1952. Ahmad Saeed Dehlawi was appointed the rector on 13 January 1952. Ahmad resigned after serving for over two and a half year, and subsequently Wasif Dehlawi became the rector in 1955. Wasif was made to resign in 1979. Ziya al-Haq Dehlawi briefly served as the rector making Wasif's son Jameelur Rahman Qasmi succeed him. Following Qasmi's sudden death, Mufti Abdur Rahman became the seminary's rector. Wasif's second son, Anisur Rahman Qasmi was the rector during 2017 and 2018. As of March 2019, Hafiz Abdur Rasheed is the rector of the seminary.

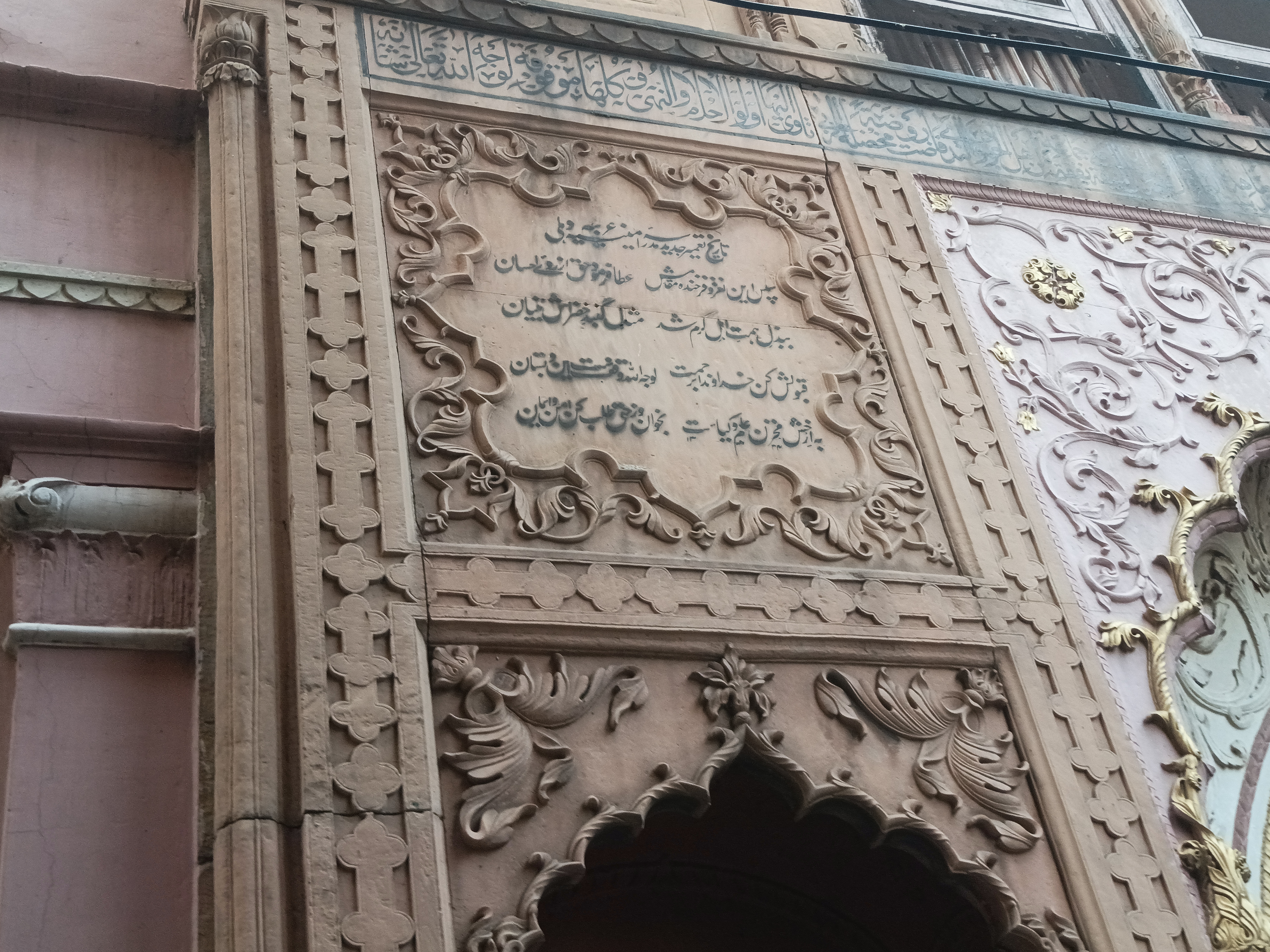
Inscription in Persian language depicting modern constructions of Madrasa Aminia

Hadith scholar Anwar Shah Kashmiri was seminary's first Principal (Sadr Mudarris) who was later succeeded by Kifayatullah Dehlawi, who also became the second rector, succeeding Amin al-Din Dehlawi.

Indian Independence activist and author Muhammad Miyan Deobandi also served this seminary as Hadith Professor.

== Notable alumni ==
- Ahmad Saeed Dehlavi
- Mahdi Hasan Shahjahanpuri
- Muhammad Taqi Amini
- Noor Alam Khalil Amini
- Wasif Dehlavi
- Muhammad Junagarhi
