= Hafizur Rahman Wasif Dehlavi =

Indian Muslim scholar

Mawlānā, Mufti Hafizur Rahman Wasif Dehlavi

4th Rector of Madrasa Aminia
- In office September 1955 – 1979
- Preceded by: Ahmad Saeed Dehlavi

Personal life
- Born: 10 February 1910 Shahjahanpur, British India
- Died: 13 March 1987 (aged 77) Delhi, India
- Parent: Kifayatullah Dehlawi (father)
- Notable work(s): Urdū Masdar Nāmā, Zar-i gul
- Education: Madrasa Aminia

Religious life
- Religion: Islam

Hafizur Rahman Wasif Dehlavi (10 February 1910 – 13 March 1987) was an Indian Muslim scholar, jurist, literary critic, and a poet of the Urdu language, who served as the rector of Madrasa Aminia from 1955 to 1979. He participated in the Indian freedom struggle movement and authored books such as Adabī bhūl bhulayyān̲, Urdū Masdar Nāmā and Taz̲kirah-yi Sā'il. He compiled the religious edicts of his father Kifayatullah Dehlawi as Kifāyat al-Mufti in nine volumes.

== Biography ==
Hafizur Rahman Wasif Dehlavi was born on 10 February 1910 in Shahjahanpur. He was the eldest son of Kifayatullah Dehlawi, the Grand Mufti of India. He studied at the Madrasa Aminia with his father Kifayatullah Dehlawi and scholars including Khuda Bakhsh and Abdul Ghafoor Aarif Dehalvi. He studied Islamic calligraphy with Hamid Hussain Faridabadi and Munshi Abdul Ghani.

Wasif was a calligrapher, literary critic, poet and an Islamic jurist. Aged 15, he started to write poetry in Persian. His earliest poetry in Urdu was a marsiya about Hakim Ajmal Khan, which appeared in the 22 January 1928 edition of Al-Jamiat. He wrote in the ghazal, nazm, qasida, musaddas and other genres of Urdu poetry. He was a student of Saail Dehlavi and Nooh Narvi in poetry. Jameel Mehdi would say that, "Wasif is the only poet after Jigar Moradabadi who has an equal command over calligraphy. If he was not a poet, he would have been a great calligrapher."

Wasif started his career as a teacher of Arabic language and literature in the Government of Delhi's education department. In 1936, his father made him the manager of Kutub Khana Rahimiya. He was appointed the vice-rector of Madrasa Aminia in 1953. He became the rector in September 1955 and resigned in 1979. He also participated in the Indian freedom struggle. He died on 13 March 1987 in Delhi.

== Literary works ==
Wasif compiled the religious edicts issued by his father Kifayatullah Dehlawi as Kifāyat al-Mufti in nine volumes. Pakistani historian Abu Salman Shahjahanpuri has regarded this as his major academic, political, religious and living work. Wasif's other works include:

- Adabī bhūl bhulayyān̲: zabān-o-qawā'id aur Urdū imlā par tanqīd
- Jamī'at-i Ulamā par ek tārīk̲h̲ī tabṣirah (A book discussing the history of Jamiat Ulama-e-Hind and its establishment)
- Sih lisānī Masdar Nāmā (Dictionary of Urdu verbs with their Arabic and Persian equivalents)
- Taz̲kirah-yi Sā'il (Biography of Saail Dehalvi)
- Urdū Masdar Nāmā
- Zar-i gul (Poetic collection)

== See also ==
- List of Deobandis
