= Muhammad Mian Mansoor Ansari =

Indian independence activist

Muhammad Mian Mansoor Ansari مولانا منصور انصاري
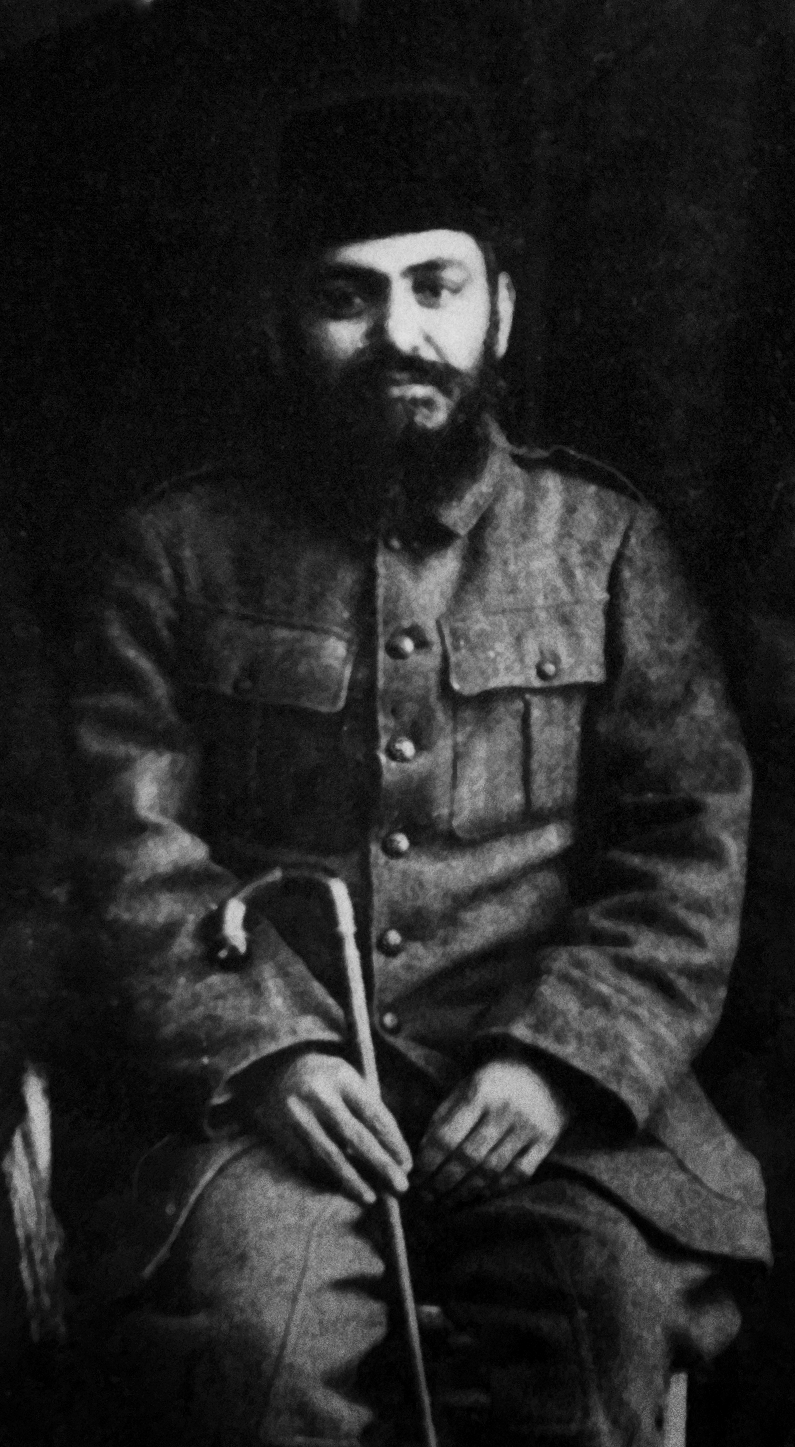

Personal life
- Born: 1884 Saharanpur, North-Western Provinces, British India
- Died: 11 January 1946 (aged 61–62) Jalalabad, Nangarhar, Afghanistan
- Children: Hamid al-Ansari Ghazi, Obaid ullah Mansoori, Saifullah Mansoori
- Era: British Raj

Religious life
- Religion: Islam
- Movement: Deobandi movement

Muhammad Mian Mansoor Ansari (10 March 1884 – 11 January 1946; Arabic, Pashto and Persian: Urdu: محمد میان منصور انصاري), was a leader and a political activist of the Indian independence movement. He was a grandson of Muhammad Qasim Nanautavi, one of the founders of Darul Uloom Deoband in 1868. Along with Mahmud Hasan Deobandi, he was one of the pioneer of the Silk Letter movement against British Raj.

== Early life ==
Muhammad Mian Mansoor Ansari was born into an Ansari family in Saharanpur. He grew up in the house of Abdullah Ansari. Mansoor Ansari returned to the Darul-Uloom Deoband and gradually became involved in the Pan-Islamic movement. During World War I, he was among the leaders of the Deoband School, who, led by Mahmud Hasan Deobandi, left India to seek support of the Central Powers for a Pan-Islamic revolution in India in what came to be known as the Silk Letter Movement.

== Silk letter movement ==
These letters were written on silk cloth, hence the name. The hero of Silk Letter Movement, Maulana Muhammad Mian Mansoor Ansari, the one who went to Hejaz, Ottoman Empire with Maulana Mahmud al-Hasan in September 1915 and worked as treasurer of the Jama’at. He returned to India in April 1916 with Ghalib Nama (Silk Letter) which he showed to freedom fighters in India and the autonomous area and then took it to Kabul, Afghanistan in June 1916.

== Later years ==
Mansoor Ansari went to Kabul during the First World War to rally the Afghan Amir Habibullah Khan. He joined the Provisional Government of India formed in Kabul in December 1915, and remained in Afghanistan until the end of the war. He traveled to Russia and spent two years in Turkey, passing through many other countries.

He was one of the most active and prominent members of the faction of the Indian Freedom Movement led by Muslim traditional scholars' class who were chiefly from the Darul Uloom Deoband.

In 1946, the Indian National Congress requested him to return to India and the British Government gave him the permission to do so. But he decided to remain at Kabul, where he began a programme teaching and translating Tafsir Sheikh Mahmudul Hassan Deobandi (known as Kabuli Tafseer).

== Literary works ==
Ansāri wrote following books:

- Hukūmat-e-Ilāhi;;
- Asās-Inqelāb
- Dastoor-e-Imāmat

== Death and legacy ==
In 1946, Muhammad Mian Mansoor Ansari turned seriously ill and subsequently died on 11 January 1946 at Jalalabad, Nangarhar Province in Afghanistan and was buried there. His son Hamid al-Ansari Ghazi was the editor of Madina.

== See also ==
- List of Deobandis
