= Kifayatullah Dehlawi =

Indian Islamic scholar (1875–1952)

Mufti-e-Azam (Grand Mufti of India) Kifayatullah Dehlawi

Interim President of Jamiat Ulama-e-Hind
- In office November 1919 – November 1920
- Preceded by: "position established"
- Succeeded by: Mahmud Hasan Deobandi

2nd President of Jamiat Ulama-e-Hind
- In office 6 September 1921 – 7 June 1940
- Preceded by: Mahmud Hasan Deobandi
- Succeeded by: Hussain Ahmad Madani

2nd Rector of Madrasa Aminia
- In office "unknown" – 31 December 1952
- Preceded by: Amin al-Din Dehlawi
- Succeeded by: Ahmad Saeed Dehlavi

Personal life
- Born: 1875 Shahjahanpur, North-Western Provinces, British India
- Died: 31 December 1952 (aged 77) Delhi, India
- Children: Hafizur Rahman Wasif Dehlavi (son)
- Notable work(s): Ta'limul-Islam, Kifāyat al-Mufti
- Education: Madrasah I'zaziyah, Shahjahanpur; Madrasa Shahi; Darul Uloom Deoband

Religious life
- Religion: Islam
- Denomination: Sunni
- Jurisprudence: Hanafi
- Creed: Maturidi
- Movement: Deobandi

Muslim leader
- Students: Mahdi Hasan Shahjahanpuri
- Influenced by: Mahmud Hasan Deobandi

Kifayatullah Dehlawi (also known as Mufti Kifayatullah; c. 1875 – c. 31 December 1952), was an Indian Islamic scholar and a Hanafi jurist, who served as the second rector of the Madrasa Aminia. He was appointed as an interim president of the Jamiat Ulama-e-Hind on its foundation, and as its second president following the death of Mahmud Hasan Deobandi. He was regarded as the Grand Mufti of India.

He was a founding member of Jamia Millia Islamia, New Delhi, and was on its foundation committee, which was headed by Mahmud Hasan Deobandi.

== Lineage ==
Dehlawi’s family had shifted from Bhopal to Shahjahanpur. Dehlawi‘s father, Inayatullah, had four sons and two daughters and was poor.

== Early life ==
Kifayatullah ibn Inayatullah ibn Faidhullah ibn Khairullah ibn 'Ibadullah Dehlvi was born in Shahjahanpur, a district in Uttar Pradesh, India in 1875. At the age of five, he commenced his education at the maktab of Hafiz Barakatullah. There, he completed the Qur'an and obtained instruction in Urdu and elementary Persian from Nasimullah. Thereafter, he enrolled at Madrasa 'Azeeziya. There, he completed his Persian studies, studying the most advanced kitab of Persian, Sikandar Naama, and commenced his Arabic studies under Budhun Khan. Then, Dehlawi was sent with a letter of recommendation from his teacher, 'Ubaidul Haq, to the administrator of the Madrasa 'Arabiya at Shahi Masjid in Muradabad. He was admitted and remained at the residence of Muhammad Isma'il. Since his father was poor, Dehlawi covered his educational expenses by weaving and selling topis. He studied there for two years. Dehlawi then enrolled at Darul Uloom Deoband in 1895. Because of his memory and intelligence, he did not exert as much effort but quickly overtook his classmates and earned the highest marks on his examinations. He completed his studies at Darul Uloom Deoband in 1898 at the age of twenty-two.

== Career ==
After graduating, Dehlawi spent time in Delhi with his close friend, Aminuddin. Then, he returned to Shahjahanpur, where his former teacher, 'Ubaidul Haq, had founded Madrasa 'Ainul 'Ilm. Dehlawi became a teacher there and handled the secretarial and administrative duties. Dehlawi also taught Arabic and Persian. His salary was fifteen rupees per month. Along with his duties as a teacher and administrator, Dehlawi started to answer fatwas during this period. In his answer to each fatwa, Dehlawi was meticulous and cautious and would answer with well-written evidence. While at Madrasa 'Ainul 'Ilm, Dehlawi also started a monthly periodical, Al Burhan, in response to the Qadianis. The first issue was published in Sha'baan of 1321 AH and made an attempt to refute Qadiyani beliefs.

Around this time, Madrasa 'Ainul 'Ilm’s finances started to deteriorate. Thus, in 1321 AH, the teachers' salaries were reduced. Dehlawi’s salary was reduced from eighteen to sixteen rupees per month. However, he remained at Madrasa 'Ainul 'Ilm for five more years until the death of his teacher, 'Ubaidul Haq Khan. Thereafter, Dehlawi moved to Delhi and became a teacher at Madrasa Aminia. Besides teaching hadith and answering fatwas, Dehlawi managed the organizational affairs of the madrasa. His salary was twenty rupees per month.

The courts of law benefited from his presence as well. After his arrival at Madrasa Aminia, Dehlawi commenced a step-by-step implementation of beneficial reforms to the educational structure of the madrasa. Then, in 1328 AH, he initiated an assembly called Anjuman Islahul Kalaam. The purpose of this gathering was to teach students how to deliver speeches and debate. Every eighth day, each student had to deliver a speech or engage in a dialogue and Dehlawi would help. This assembly was successful in its aim, but was eventually ended due to a lack of participation. After fifty years, Dehlawi had answered hundreds of thousands of fataawa and his rulings are a treasure to fiqh. The fatwas of Dehlawi were extremely concise yet full of well-written evidence. His fatwas were always answered according to the intent of the questioner. It was for this reason that he was renowned among common folk as well as the officials of the courts of law, who would prefer his rulings in religious cases.

He was appointed the first president of the Jamiat Ulama-e-Hind, a position he served until 1940. He also drafted a fatwa recommending a boycott of British goods which was signed by around 500 Muslim scholars.

== Literary career ==
From an early age, Dehlawi enjoyed reading and writing. His first major endeavour was the magazine, Al Burhan, which he wrote in refutation of the Qadiyani beliefs. His second major work was an Arabic poem, Raudur Rayyaahin, published in 1909. It was first presented at the annual convention of Madrasa Aminia in 1908. The eloquence and grandeur of the poem were such that Dehlawi was requested to produce an Urdu translation with footnotes, providing more details than and explaining difficult words from the original. Dehlawi’s most renowned publication is Ta'limul Islam, four volumes of questions and answers for children as well as adults in simple language. The 4 volumes can be considered as 4 modules of a course in which a student gets a basic certificate on the 1st, an intermediate degree on the 2nd, a diploma degree on the 3rd, and a professional degree in Taleem ul Islam on completion of all volumes/modules. Dehlawi wrote other religious books which are no longer available. He actually produced few works because his teaching, political activities, domestic activities, and answering fatwas busied him to such an extent that he had no time to write.

== Final years and death ==
During his final years, due to what he saw as the deterioration of morality in society, clashes between Hindus and Muslims, and other reasons, Dehlawi withdrew from politics and became reclusive, not even giving public comment.

In his final months, he suffered severe liver illness, despite medical treatment. On 31 December 1952, he died at the age of 77. He was buried near Qutbuddin Bakhtiar Kaki, in Mehrauli, Delhi. His funeral was attended by 100,000 people.

== Students ==
Dehlawi‘s students include Muhammad Taqi Amini, Izaz Ali Amrohi. Hazrat Molana Allah Yar Khan, Chakrala Pakistan.

== Bibliography ==
- Maclean, D.N.; Ahmed, S.K. (2012). Cosmopolitanisms in Muslim Contexts: Perspectives from the Past. Edinburgh University Press Series. Edinburgh University Press. p. 170. ISBN 978-0-7486-4456-8.
- Shibly, A.H. (2011). Abdul Matin Chaudhury (1895-1948): Trusted Lieutenant of Mohammad Ali Jinnah. Juned A. Choudhury. p. 59. ISBN 978-984-33-2323-1.
- Shinde, P.K. (2005). Dalits and Human Rights: Dalits: the broken future. Isha Books. p. 259. ISBN 978-81-8205-274-1.
