= All India Muslim Majlis-e-Mushawarat =

Federation of Indian Muslim organisations

- Abbreviation: AIMMM
- Formation: 8 August 1964 (62 years ago)
- Founders: Syed Mahmud, Mufti Atiq-ur-Rahman Usmani, Mohammad Ismaili, Abul Lais Islahi, Manzur Nu'mani, Mulla Jan Mohammad, Mohammad Muslim, Abul Hasan Ali Nadwi, Ibrahim Sulaiman Seth
- Founded at: Lucknow
- Type: NGO
- Legal status: Active
- Headquarters: Delhi, India
- Location: D-250, Abul Fazal Enclave, Jamia Nagar, New Delhi – 110 025, India
- Coordinates: 28.5573692°N 77.2929899°E
- Region served: India
- President: Mr. Feroze Ahmad
- General Secretary: Mr. Shaikh Manzoor Ahmad
- Website: mushawarat.org

All India Muslim Majlis-e-Mushawarat (AIMMM or MMM) is a federation of various Muslim organisations in India. Majlis-e-Mushawarat was formally launched at a two-day (August 8–9) meeting in 1964 at the Islamic seminary Darul Uloom Nadwatul Ulama, Lucknow. Several leading Muslim scholars and clerics, including Syed Abul Hasan Ali Nadvi, attended the meet while freedom fighter and a member of Jawaharlal Nehru's cabinet Syed Mahmud was elected its first president. It was established as an advocacy group in the wake of communal riots in the early 1960s.

AIMMM has a long history of serving the community in its struggle to get equitable justice, for Hindu-Muslim unity, defending its religious and legal rights and in the formation of All India Muslim Personal Law Board; “AMU Action Committee” for restoration of its minority character in 1967; in struggle for Babri Masjid by constituting “Babri Masjid Coordination Committee” and in reaching communal strife areas and extending help to the victims with its limited resources.

== Origin and history ==
The All India Muslim Majlis-e-Mushawarat (AIMMM), an apex forum of Muslim organizations and institutions of national eminence along with some well-known personalities, was established at a representative meeting of the community leaders held on 8–9 August 1964 at Dar-ul-Uloom Nadwatul Ulama, Lucknow, inaugurated by Abul Hasan Ali Nadwi and chaired by Syed Mahmood. Apart from them, Atiqur Rahman Usmani, Abul Lais Islahi, Qari Muhammad Tayyib, Kalb-e- Abid, Sayyid Minatullah Rahmani, Mohammad Muslim, Maulana Jan Mohammad and Ebrahim Sulaiman Seth played the key roles.

It was formed under the shadow of large-scale communal riots in Bihar and Orissa, and the delegation had then toured the affected areas to give solace to the victims and to promote peaceful co-existence among communities. The term Mushawarat, having an Arabic origin, means consultation. The purpose of AIMMM is to work towards providing a common platform for different Muslim organisations to collectively think, speak, deliberate and arrive at a common minimum programme.

AIMMM celebrated its Golden Jubilee on August 31, 2015 at India Islamic Cultural Centre in New Delhi. The function was inaugurated by Vice-President of India, Mohammad Hamid Ansari.

== Structure ==
AIMMM has four tier structure, Majalis-e-Mushawarat at the national (Central Body), the state, the district and the town level and all levels are organically linked with the central body. The main organs of the AIMMM at the national level are the Supreme Guidance Council, Markazi Majlis-e-Mushawarat, Markazi Majlis-e-Amla and the office-bearers.

=== Presidents of AIMMM ===
- Syed Mahmood
- Atiqur Rahman Usmani
- Sheikh Zulfiquarullah
- Muhammad Salim Qasmi
- Syed Shahabuddin (2000-2007)
- Zafar-ul-Islam Khan (2008-2009)
- Syed Shahabuddin (2010-2011)
- Zafar-ul Islam Khan (2014-2015)
- Navaid Hamid (2015-2021)
- Feroze Ahmad (April 2023 - to date)

== Affiliated organisations ==
- Association of Muslim Professionals
- All India Educational Movement
- Indian National League
- Indian Union Muslim League
- All India Majlis Tameer-e-Millat
- Jamaat-e-Islami Hind
- Markazi Jamiat Ahl-e-Hadees Hind
- Markazi Jamiatul Ulama-e-Hind
- All India Jamiatul Quresh
- All India Momin Conference
- All India Muslim OBC Organisation
- Movement for Empowerment of Muslim Indians
- All India Shia Conference
- South Asian Minorities Lawyers Association
- Students Islamic Organisation
- UP Rabita Committee

== Social service and reform ==
All India Muslim Majlis-e-Mushawarat has criticised All India Muslim Personal Law Board for not mentioning the methods of talaq practiced by the Ahle Hadees and Jafri (Shia) sects, who form two major subsets within Muslim community, in its affidavit submitted to five bench committee of Supreme Court of India, formed to hear the Triple Talaq issue.

Mushawarat President Navaid Haimid wrote an open letter to Prime Minister Narendra Modi bringing his attention to the development in the country in the backdrop of cow slaughter ban and the fear created by various organized groups including RSS.

AIMMM also welcome Government's recommendations for Muslims' education in India and was optimistic about it.
