= Ahmad Saeed Dehlavi =

Indian Muslim scholar (d. 1959)

Mawlānā Ahmad Saeed Dehlavi

Sahbān al-Hind

1st General Secretary of Jamiat Ulama-e-Hind
- In office 1920 – 13 July 1940
- Preceded by: "office established"
- Succeeded by: Abul Muhasin Muhammad Sajjad

5th President of Jamiat Ulama-e-Hind
- In office 1957 – 4 December 1959
- Preceded by: Hussain Ahmad Madani
- Succeeded by: Syed Fakhruddin Ahmad

3rd Rector of Madrasa Aminia
- In office 1953 – September 1955
- Preceded by: Kifayatullah Dehlawi
- Succeeded by: Hafizur Rahman Wasif Dehlavi

Personal life
- Born: 1888 Daryaganj, British India
- Died: 4 December 1959 (aged 70–71) Delhi, India
- Notable work(s): Fear of Hell, Key to the Garden of Bliss
- Education: Madrasa Aminia

Religious life
- Religion: Islam
- Denomination: Sunni
- Jurisprudence: Hanafi
- Movement: Deobandi

Ahmad Saeed Dehlavi (also known as Sahbān al-Hind; 1888 – 4 December 1959) was an Indian Muslim scholar and freedom struggle activist who served as the first general secretary and the fifth president of Jamiat Ulama-e-Hind. He also served as the third rector of Madrasa Aminia and authored books such as Fear of Hell and Key to the Garden of Bliss.

== Biography ==
Ahmad Saeed Dehlavi in 1888 in Daryaganj, Delhi. He received his primary education from Abdul Majeed Mustafabadi and Muhammad Yasin Sikandarabadi, and memorized the Quran at Madrasa Hussainia in Delhi. He entered Madrasa Aminia in 1328 AH and graduated in 1336 AH. His teachers included Kifayatullah Dehlawi.

Saeed participated in the Indian freedom struggle and was imprisoned eight times. He was arrested in 1921 and jailed in the Central Jail Mianwali for one year. He was arrested for the last time in 1942 and imprisoned in the jails of Delhi, Lahore, Ferozpur and Multan. He was among the founders of the Jamiat Ulama-e-Hind (JUH) and was appointed the interim secretary in the meeting of inception in November 1919.

Saeed was appointed the first general secretary of the JUH in November 1920, a position he served for twenty years. He served as the vice-president of the JUH for seventeen years from 1940 to 1957. He taught at the Madrasa Aminia and was appointed its rector in 1953 following the death of Kifayatullah Dehlawi. He served as the president of the JUH for two years from 1957 until his death on 4 December 1959 in Delhi.

Saeed was seen as an influential speaker. He was known as Sahbān al-Hind.

== Legacy ==
In September 2019, JUH organized a two-days seminar on the life and works of Saeed. It was attended by scholars and poets including Akhtarul Wasey, Gulzar Dehlvi and Usman Mansoorpuri.

== Literary works ==
Saeed wrote Kashf-ur-Rahman, an exegesis of the Quran, in Urdu, in two volumes. His other works include:

- Dozakh ka khatka (Fear of Hell)
- Jannat ki Kunji (Key to the Garden of Bliss)
- Jannat ki Zamānat
- Khuda ki baatein
- Rasūlullāh ke tīn sau mo'jizāt (Three Hundred Miracles of Muhammad)
- Shaukat Āra Begum

== See also ==
- List of Deobandis

== Bibliography ==
- Salman Mansoorpuri (2014). Tehreek Azadi-e-Hind Mai Muslim Ulama aur Awaam ka Kirdar (in Urdu). Deoband: Deeni Kitab Ghar. pp. 194–195.
- Asir Adrawi (April 2016). Tazkirah Mashāhīr-e-Hind: Karwān-e-Rafta (in Urdu) (2 ed.). Deoband: Darul Muallifeen. pp. 20–21.
- Shahjahanpuri, Abu Salman (2011). Sahban-ul-Hind Mawlānā Ahmad Saeed Dehlavi: Ek Siyāsi Mutāla (in Urdu). Delhi: Farid Book Depot.
