= Muhammad Junagarhi =

Indian Islamic scholar (1890–1941)

Mawlana, Shaykh Muhammad Junagarhi محمد جوناگڑھی
- Title: Khatib e Hind

Personal life
- Born: 1891 Junagadh State
- Died: 1941 (aged 50–51) Junagadh
- Main interest(s): Tafsir, Ilm al-Hadith, Aqeeda, Fiqh
- Notable work(s): Translation of Holy Qur'an into Urdu; Translation of Tafsir ibn Kathir into Urdu
- Education: Madrasa Aminia; Madrasa Darul Kitab wa al-Sunnah

Religious life
- Religion: Islam
- Denomination: Sunni
- Jurisprudence: Ghayr muqallid
- Creed: Athari
- Movement: Ahl-i Hadith

Muhammad ibn Ibrahim Junagarhi (Urdu: محمد ابن ابراہیم جوناگڑھی, romanized: Muḥammad ibn Ibrāhīm Jūnāgaṛhī) (1890–1941), commonly known as Muhammad Junagarhi, was an Indian Islamic scholar who co-founded and served as the president of the All-India Ahl-i Hadith Conference. He translated Ibn Qayyim's I'laam ul Muwaqqi'een 'an Rabb il 'Aalameen and Ibn Kathir's exegesis of the Quran into Urdu language.

== Biography ==
Muhammad Junagarhi was born in 1890 in the state of Junagadh to Ibrahim and belonged to Memon ethnic group. He was thus known as Muhammad ibn Ibrahim Junagarhi. He completed his early education from the town and later moved to Delhi for higher education. In Delhi, he studied at the Madrasa Aminia. He discontinued his studies at the Aminia and went to Madrasa Darul Kitaba wa- al-Sunnah of Abdul Wahhab Multani, from where he graduated.

Junagarhi co-founded the All-India Ahl-i Hadith Conference and served as the president of the All-India Ahl-i Hadith Conference. He died in 1941 at the age of 51. He was known with the title of Khatib-i Hind (Note: Khateeb e Hind is a title given to Islamic scholar for their scholarship. Many scholars may be known by Khateeb e Hind.)

== Literary works ==
Junagarhi translated Tafsir Ibn Kathir and Ibn Qayyim's I'laam ul Muwaqqi'een 'an Rabb il 'Aalameen into Urdu language. His other works include:

- Sayf-i Muḥammadī
- Shamʻ-i Muḥammadī
- Tafsīr Aḥsan ul-Bāyan, a translation of the Quran with commentary by Hafiz Salahuddin Yusuf.

== Sources ==
- Iraqi, Abdul Rasheed (2019). 40 Ahl-e Hadith Scholars from the Indian Subcontinent. Independently Published. pp. 156–166. ISBN 9781081008956.
- Iraqi, Abdul Rasheed (2004). Tazkara Tu Al Nubala Fi Trajim Al-ulama [تذکرۃ النبلاء فی تراجم العلماء] (in Urdu). Lahore: Maktaba-e-Baitul Hikmat, Lahore. pp. 351–353.
- Junagarhi, Muhammad (2006). Saif e Mohammadi [سیف محمدی] (in Urdu). Lahore: Publisher of Qur'an and Hadith, Pakistan. pp. 10–14.
- Mohammadi, Mohammad Ameen (2019). Tehreek e Pakistan Me Ulmae Ahle Hadith Ka Kirdar [تحریک پاکستان میں علماء اہل حدیث کا کردار] (in Urdu). Lahore: Dar al-Muslimeen, Urdu Bazar. p. 548.
- Iraqi, Abdul Rasheed (2007). Barre-Sagheer-Pak-w-Hind-Me-Ilam-e-Hadith [برصغیر پاک و ہند میں علم حدیث] (in Urdu). Lahore: Mohaddis Ropari Academy, Dalgaran Chowk. pp. 67–68.
