= Hafiz Salahuddin Yusuf =

Pakistani Islamic scholar (1945–2020)

- حافظ صلاح الدین یوسف

Personal life
- Born: Salahuddin Yusuf; 1945; Jaipur, India
- Died: 12 July 2020 (aged 74–75); Lahore, Pakistan
- Citizenship: Pakistani

Religious life
- Religion: Islam
- Denomination: Sunni

Hafiz Salahuddin Yusuf (Note: Urdu: حافظ صلاح الدین یوسف) (1945 – 12 July 2020) was an Indian born Pakistani Islamic scholar and former editor-in-chief of Al-Aitisam weekly (a Pakistani weekly magazine) for twenty four years. He was the head of Darussalam's Research Division department in Lahore.

== Early life ==
Salahuddin Yusuf was born in August 1945 in Jaipur, India to a religious family. His father, Abdul Shakoor named him Yusuf. In 1949, after the partition of India, his family moved to Pakistan's Hyderabad then shifted to Karachi.

== Career ==
Yusuf served as the editor-in-chief of Al-Aitisam weekly (a Pakistani weekly magazine) for twenty four years. He was the head of Darussalam's Research Division department in Lahore.

== Works ==
Salahuddin Yusuf has translated and written several books including Quranic Tafseer in Urdu, Arabic and English. Some of them are:

=== As author ===
- Tafseer Ahsanul-Bayan (Tafseer of Quran) in Urdu, Arabic and English. This was translated by Muhammad Junagarhi and Tafseer was completed by Salahuddin Yusuf.
- Namaz-e-Mohammadi (Urdu)
- Celebrating of Eid Milad-un-Nabi (Urdu)
- Khilafat o Malokiat Ki Shara'i Hasiat (Urdu)
- Aurton Ke Imtiazi Masail (Urdu)

=== As Translator ===
- Riyadh Al-Saliheen in Urdu Language

== Death ==
Salahuddin Yusuf died on 12 July 2020 at the age of 75 in Pakistan's Lahore.

== Bibliography ==
- Iraqi, Abdul Rasheed (2004). تذکرۃ النبلاء فی تراجم العلماء [Tazkirat al-Nabula; translations of scholars] (in Urdu) (1st ed.). Lahore, Pakistan: Baitul Hikmat. pp. 137–140.
- Bhatti, Muhammad Ishaq (2008). Dabastane Hadees [School of Hadith] (in Urdu). Lahore: Maktabah Qudosia, Lahore. pp. 578–588.
- Al-Meezan, Abu (2021). Hafiz Salahuddin Yusuf: Zindagi wa Khidmat [Hafiz Salahuddin Yusuf: Life and Contribution] (in Urdu). Mumbai: Subai Jamiat Ahle Hadees, Mumbai.
