= Sunehri Masjid (Chandni Chowk) =

Mosque in Delhi, India

- Urdu: سنہری مسجد (چاندنی چوک)
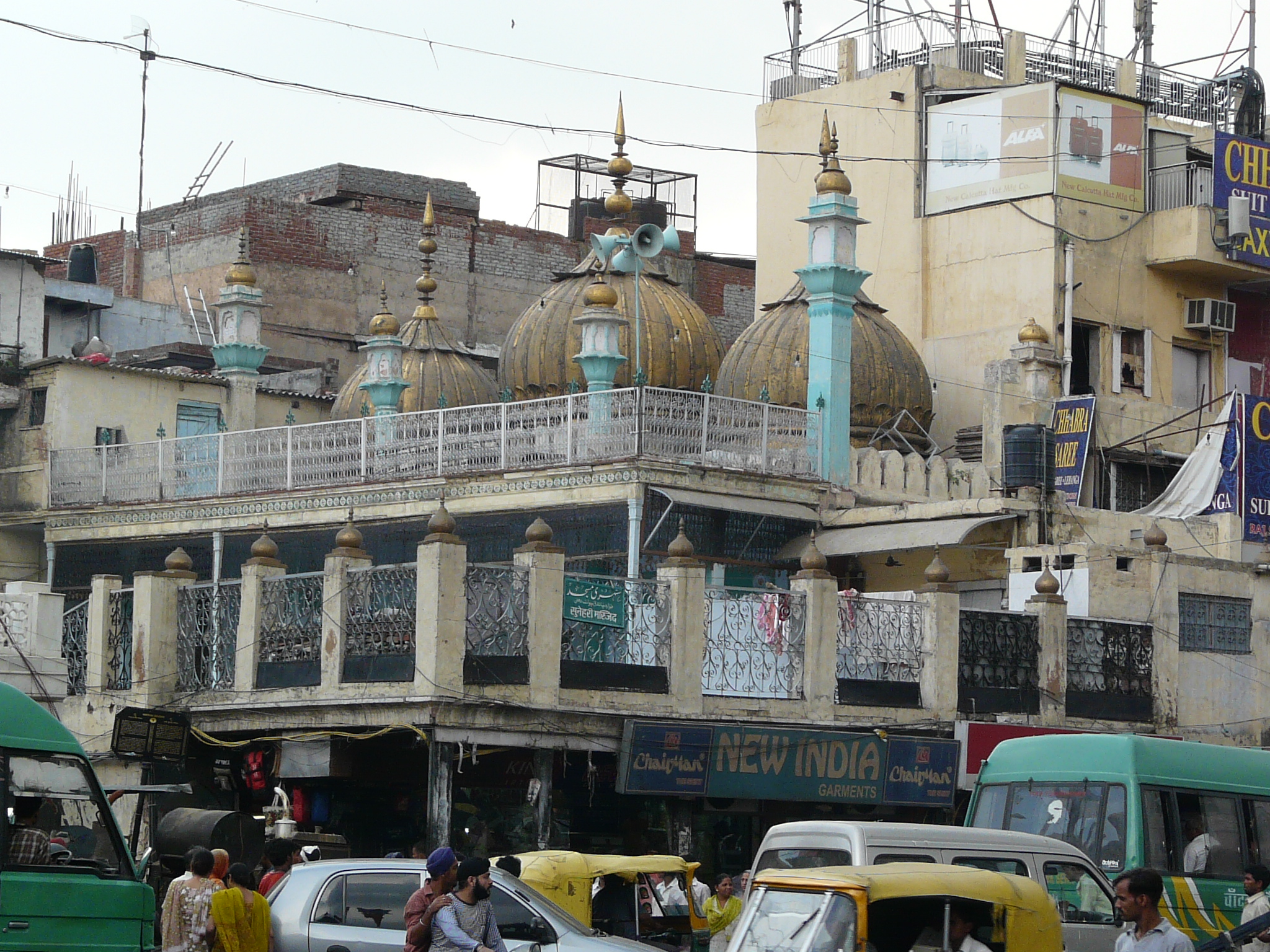
- The mosque at Chandni Chowk, in 2009

- Location of the mosque in Central Delhi

Religion
- Affiliation: Islam
- Ecclesiastical or organisational status: Mosque
- Status: Active

Location
- Location: Chandni Chowk, Old Delhi, Central Delhi, Delhi NCT
- Country: India
- Coordinates: 28°39′22″N 77°13′55″E

Architecture
- Type: Mosque architecture
- Style: Mughal
- Completed: 1722

Specifications
- Dome: Three
- Minaret: Two

The Sunehri Masjid (Urdu: سنہری مسجد چاندنی چوک, lit. 'Golden Mosque') is an 18th-century mosque in the Chandni Chowk neighbourhood of Old Delhi, India. It was built by Mughal noble Roshan-ud-Daula, during the reign of Emperor Muhammad Shah. It is located near the Gurudwara Sis Ganj Sahib in Chandni Chowk, once an imperial boulevard leading to the Red Fort.

The mosque's original appearance has been altered as extensions to accommodate the faithful have been constructed. The mosque is also under threat from encroachment.

== History ==
The Sunehri Masjid was built in the period 1721–1722 by Roshan-ud-Daula, a Mughal amir who was beginning to rise to power in the court of the Mughal Emperor Muhammad Shah. The mosque was dedicated to Roshan-ud-Daula's spiritual mentor, Shah Bhik.

In 1739, the Persian Nadir Shah invaded Delhi. Standing in the Sunehri Masjid, he ordered the plunder of Delhi, which resulted in an immense loss of life and damage to the city.

In 1897, Islamic scholar Amin al-Din established Madrasa Aminia at the Sunehri Masjid, later on shifting it to Kashmiri Gate in 1917.

== Architecture ==
Elevated above street level on a plinth, the Sunehri Masjid is reached by a flight of stairs. The mosque is topped by three bulbous, gilted domes, and features slender minarets. The façade of the mosque bears three arched entryways. The interior of the mosque is divided into three bays. Stucco decoration work appears in both the interior and exterior of the mosque, in the form of arabesques and floral motifs.

== Gallery ==
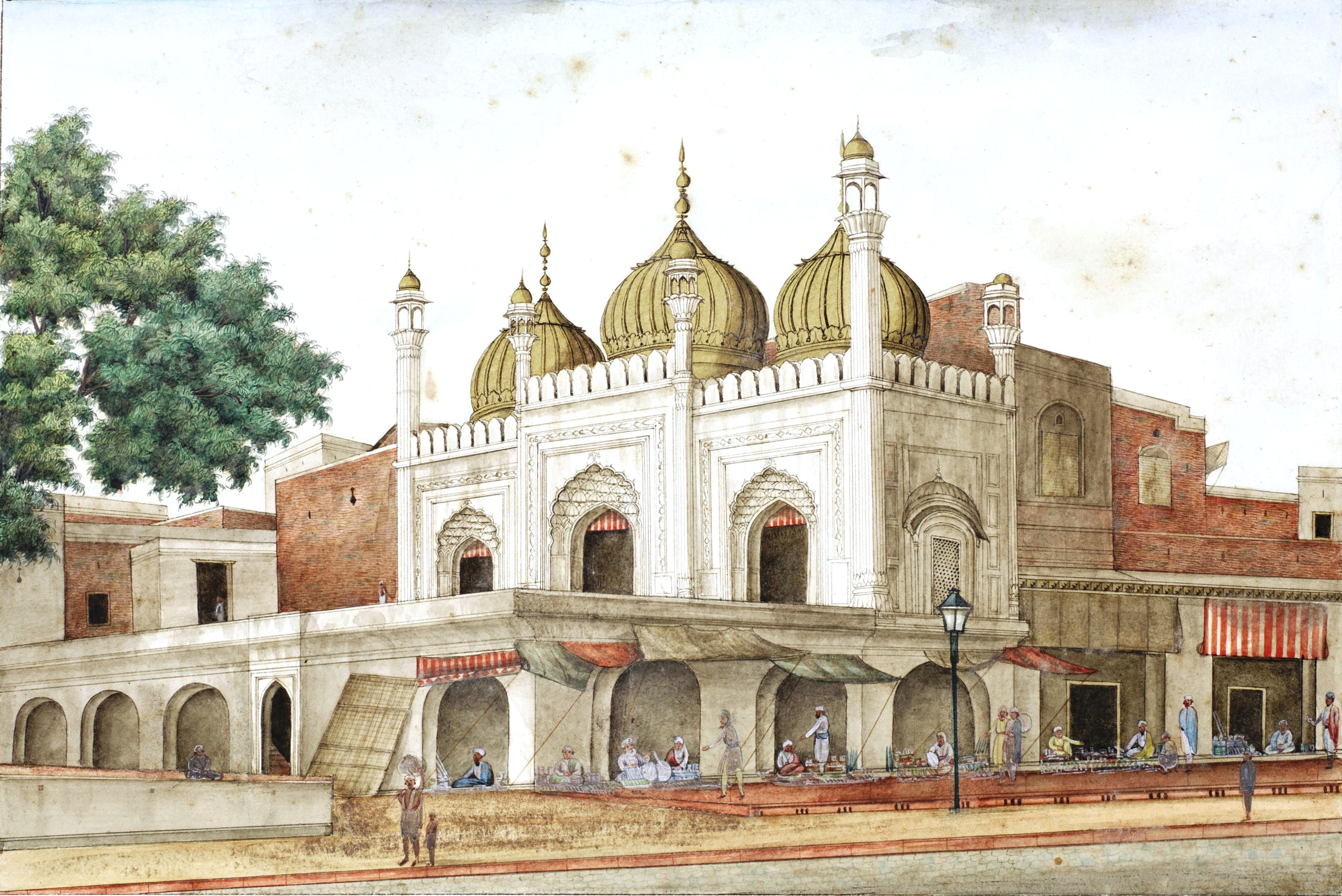
1850s painting of the mosque, by Ghulam Ali Khan

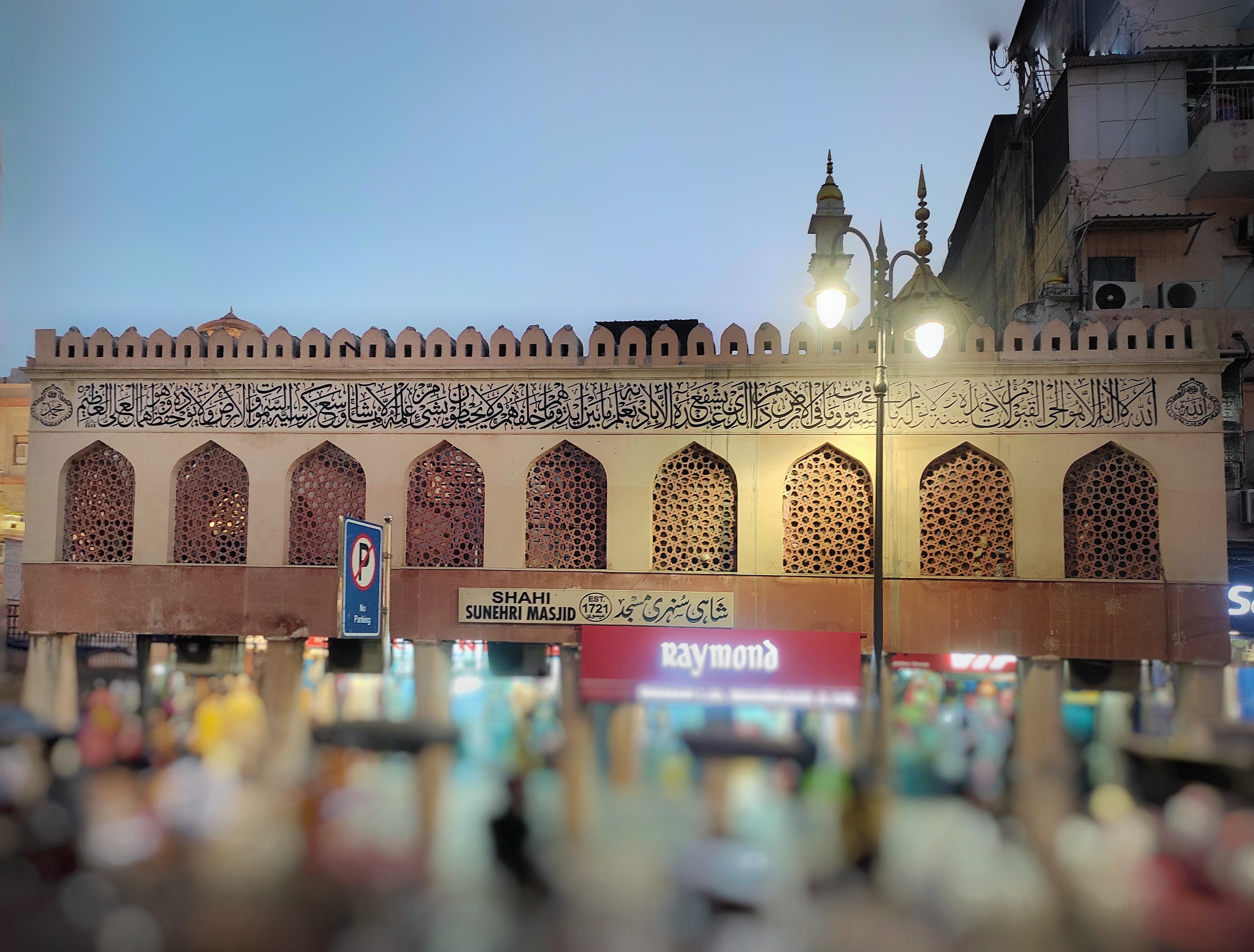
The mosque in 2022, after the newly placed walls were installed

== See also ==
- Islam in India
- List of mosques in India
