= Momin Khan Momin =

Indian poet (1800–1852)

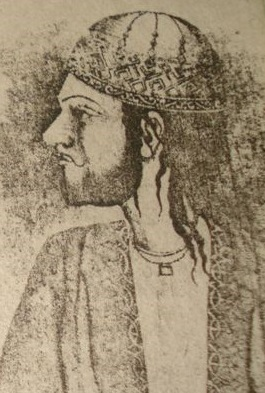
- Momin Khan Momin
- Born: 1800; Delhi, Mughal Empire, now India
- Died: 14 May 1852 (aged 51–52); Delhi, Mughal Empire, now India
- Resting place: Mehdiyan, Delhi, India
- Occupations: Poet, writer and Hakim (physician)
- Writing career
- Genres: Philosophy, spiritualism
- Notable works: Kulliyat-e-Momin (Momin's complete works of poetry)

Momin Khan Momin (مومن خان مومن; 1800 – 14 May 1852) was a late Mughal era poet known for his Urdu ghazals. A lesser-known contemporary of Ghalib and Zauq, he used "Momin" as his pen name. His grave is located in the Mehdiyan cemetery in Maulana Azad Medical College, Delhi.

== Life ==
Momin Khan 'Momin' was born in 1800 in Delhi into a Muslim family of Kashmiri origin. His father, Ghulam Nabi Khan, was a Hakeem (physician of traditional/Unani medicine). Momin Khan received training in the family profession from a young age and himself became a hakim, due to which he is often referred to in contemporary accounts as "Hakeem Khan," Hakeem being the Urdu word for physician. However, his bent was for poetry and he soon became known more as an accomplished poet. His romantic interest suddenly was straightened out due to the associations he unwittingly gained through marriage.

In 1823, Momin married a girl belonging to a family of zamindar (land owner). The marriage became unsuccessful, and he separated from his wife. He later married Anjuman-un-Nisa Begum, a relative of Urdu poet and Sufi saint Khwaja Mir Dard. They had a son, Ahmad Nasir Khan, and a daughter, Muhammadi Begum.

== Death ==
Momin died after accidentally falling from the roof of his house on 24 Rajab 1268 Hijri (14 May 1852) at the age of 52.

Momin was something of a polymath, with several interests apart from medicine and poetry. Poetry was not something he needed to earn his living. He was also competent in mathematics, geomancy, astrology, chess and Hindustani music.

== Works ==
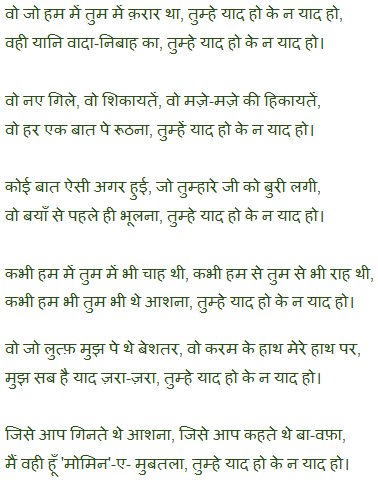
Momin Khan Momin's famous ghazal in Devnagri script.

Momin's main body of work includes a diwan and six masnavis.

Momin is known for his particular Persianized style and the beautiful use of his takhallus. According to legend, Mirza Ghalib (his contemporary and also a rival) offered Momin his entire diwan (collection of poetry) in exchange for a particular verse of Momin. However, most modern poets believe this claim as an exaggeration, which poets commonly indulged in at that time. This exaggeration was usually done to emphasise some thing. The couplet in question was:

Original Urdu

تم میرے پاس ہوتے ہو گویا
جب کوئی دوسرا نہیں ہوتا

Transliteration

Tum mērē pās hōtē hō gōyā
Jab kō'ī dūsrā nahī hotā

English translation

You are close to me [as if]
When no one else is.

This couplet's beauty is in its succinctness and multiple layers of meaning. One of the meanings is 'When you're with me (on my mind), no-one else is' and a second meaning/interpretation is 'You are with me (on my side), when no-one else is'. The two meanings emerge by the use of words gōyā and jab 'when'.

One of his very famous ghazals starts with the following matla (the first line of the opening couplet of a ghazal).

Original Urdu

وہ جو ہم میں تم میں قرار تھا، تمہیں یاد ہو کہ نہ یاد ہو
وہی یعنی وعدہ نباہ کا، تمہیں یاد ہو کہ نہ یاد ہو

Transliteration

Woh jō ham mēⁿ tum mēⁿ qarār tḣā; tumhēⁿ yād hō, keh nah yād hō:
Wohī, yaʿnī waʿdah nibāh kā; tumhēⁿ yād hō, keh nah yād hō

English translation

That understanding which we had between us... whether you remember it or not...
That promise of trust and faithfulness...whether you remember it or not...

== Cited sources ==
- Saksena, Ram Babu (1927). A History of Urdu Literature. Ram Narain Lal. ISBN 978-81-7435-161-6.
