= Ghulam Ullah Khan =

Pakistani Islamic scholar

Sheikh Ul Quran Maulana Ghulam Ullah Khan
- غلام اللہ خان

Personal life
- Born: 1905 Chhachh, Attock District
- Died: 27 May 1980 (aged 74–75)
- Cause of death: Heart attack
- Main interest: Quran
- Education: Darul Uloom Deoband; Jamiah Islamiah Talimuddin Dabhel
- Known for: Jawahir ul Quran

Religious life
- Religion: Islam
- Denomination: Sunni
- Institute: Jamiah Islamiah Talimuddin Dabhel
- Profession: Islamic scholar

Muslim leader
- Teacher: Anwar Shah Kashmiri; Hussain Ali Alwani

Ghulam Ullah Khan (born; 1905 - 27 May 1980) (Urdu: غلام اللہ خان) was a Pakistani Islamic scholar.

== Early life and education ==
Khan was born in 1904 to Malik Feroze Khan in Chhachh, Attock district. His father was pious and a village Nambardar belongs to Awan Tribe. He learned Quran from Rashid Ahmad Gangohi. He passed the middle school examination from Hazro High School and then moved to Rawalpindi and read early Persian and grammar books from Maulana Ahmad Din, a student of Maulana Saif-ur-Rehman Peshawari. Then he learned various books from Maulana Sikandar Ali and his elder brother Maulana Muhammad Ismail, a resident of Kokal (Hazara). Studied art books from Maulana Abdullah Patwar and Maulana Muhammad Din. Studied last books of rationality from Maulana Ghulam Rasool of Gujarat District and his son-in-law Maulana Waliullah. Mishkat, Jalalayn, Tafsir al-Baydawi and translation of the Quran were also studied here. Later from Maulana Hussain Ali, a resident of Wan Bhachran, learned Qur'an exegesis from him and on his instructions made a journey to Darul Uloom Deoband and studied most literature books there. Maulana Rasul Khan Hazarvi took the entrance exam. In 1933 he studied the hadith in Jamiah Islamiah Talimuddin Dabhel.

== Career ==
After graduation from Jamiah Islamiah Talimuddin Dabhel on the behest of Anwar Shah Kashmiri, he continued to teach there for one year. There he assisted Shabbir Ahmad Usmani in compiling the Tafseer-e-Usmani. On the instructions of his Sheikh Maulana Hussain Ali, he was assigned to teach at the Madrasa Barakat-ul-Islam in Wazirabad. Sheikh Abdul Ghani brought him from Wazirabad to Rawalpindi in 1939, where he worked in high school for few months. After leaving school, he started teaching in the old fort mosque and started lecturing on the Qur'an in addition to giving speeches in different places. In 1930 founded Darul Uloom Taleemul Quran. He wrote a commentary on the Qur'an called "Tafsir Jawahar-ul-Quran". He was one of the prominent scholars of Jamiat-e-Ishaat-e-Tawhid-o-Sunnah Pakistan and held the post of Nazim-e-Ala. In 1980, he was a special supporter of Zafar Ahmad Usmani, Muhammad Shafi and Ehtisham ul Haq Thanvi. And as the Ameer of Central Jamiat Ulema-e-Islam Punjab, he raised the word of truth together with these gentlemen against socialism and communist movements.

== Death ==
On the night of 26 May 1980, he died of a heart attack in Dubai. Syed Inayatullah Shah Bukhari led the funeral prayers in Liaqat Bagh and the then Chief of Army Staff and President of Pakistan General Muhammad Zia-ul-Haq also shouldered the funeral bed. About 200,000 people attended the funeral. He was buried at Jamia Ishaat-ul-Islam Attock.

== See also ==
- List of Deobandis

== Bibliography ==
- Ilyas, Mian Muhammad. حیات شیخ القرآن مولانا غلام اللہ خانؒ. Rawalpindi.
- Ma'bud, Muhammad Abdul. Savānih hayāt-i Hazrat Maulānā G̲h̲ulāmullāh K̲h̲ān. Rawalpindi: Kutubk̲h̲ānah-yi Rashīdiyyah.
