= Mushir-ul-Haq =

Indian academic and author

Vice-chancellor of University of Kashmir
- In office 1987–1990
- Preceded by: Hamidi Kashmiri

Personal details
- Born: 1933
- Died: 1990 (aged 56–57) Srinagar, India
- Education: McGill University (PhD)

Mushir-ul-Haq was an Indian academic and author who served as the vice-chancellor of the University of Kashmir. He authored books such as Islam in Secular India.

== Life and career ==
Mushir was born in 1933. He obtained his PhD from McGill University and later taught at Aligarh Muslim University and Jamia Millia Islamia. He also established the Shah-i-Hamadan Institute of Islamic Studies in 1988. He was the vice-chancellor of the Kashmir University from 1987 to 1990.

== Publications ==
Mushir-ul-Haq wrote several books including:

- Religion and Politics in Muslim India (1857-1947): A Study
- Muslim politics in modern India 1857-1947 (1970)
- Indian Muslims' Attitude to the British in the Early Nineteenth Century
- Islam in Secular India (1972).

== Death and legacy ==
Mushir was kidnapped, alongside his personal secretary Abdul Gani Zargar, on 6 April 1990; and their bodies were found on 10 April 1990. The Jammu Kashmir Students Liberation Front claimed responsibility for his kidnapping and murder.

In April 2009, the Special Court, under the Terrorist and Disruptive Activities (Prevention) Act (TADA) in Jammu, acquitted those charged with Mushir-ul-Haq's murder after a trial which had lasted nineteen years. The presiding officer ruled that one confession was inadmissible and expressed doubts about the voluntary nature of others. In the absence of any corroborating evidence, he dismissed the charges against all of the accused.

In honor of Mushir-ul-Haq, the Shah-i-Hamadan Institute of Islamic Studies at the University of Kashmir organized a memorial lecture on 12 June 2021. Akhtarul Wasey, president of Maulana Azad University, spoke at the lecture.
