= Hifzur Rahman Seoharwi =

Indian independence activist (1900–1962)

Member of Parliament, Lok Sabha
- In office 1952 – 2 August 1962
- Preceded by: Office established
- Succeeded by: J. B. Kripalani
- Constituency: Amroha

4th General Secretary of Jamiat Ulama-e-Hind
- In office 1942 – 2 August 1962
- Preceded by: Abdul Haleem Siddiqi
- Succeeded by: Muhammad Miyan Deobandi

Personal life
- Born: 1900 Seohara, Bijnor district
- Died: 2 August 1962 (aged 61–62)
- Resting place: Munhadiyan, New Delhi
- Political party: Indian National Congress
- Notable work: Tehreek-e-Pakistan Par Ek Nazar
- Education: Madrasa Shahi, Moradabad, Darul Uloom Deoband

Religious life
- Religion: Islam
- Founder of: Nadwatul Musannifeen

Hifzur Rahman Seoharwi (1900 – 2 August 1962) was an Indian Sunni Islamic scholar and an activist of the Indian independence movement, who served as the fourth general secretary of the Jamiat Ulama-e-Hind. He fought against British rule for 25 years (1922-1947) and spent eight years in jail. As a politician, he opposed the partition of India, and served as a member of the Indian Parliament for the Indian National Congress from Amroha Lok Sabha constituency from 1952 to 1962.

== Biography ==
Hifzur Rahman Seoharwi was born in 1900 (1318 AH) in a Zamindar family in Seohara, a city and municipal board in the Bijnor district of the Indian state of Uttar Pradesh. His father Haaji Shamsuddin was an assistant engineer in Bhopal state and then in Bikaner state. Seoharwi was initially home-schooled and later enrolled in Madrasa Shahi in Moradabad. He graduated in the traditional Dars-e-Nizami from the Madrasa Faiz-e-Aam in Seohara. He studied there under Abdul Ghafoor Seoharwi, Ahmad Chishti and Sayyid Aftab Ali. Later in 1922, he moved to Darul Uloom Deoband and specialized in ahadith under Anwar Shah Kashmiri and graduated in 1923 (1342 AH).

In 1938, Seoharwi co-founded the Nadwatul Musannifeen along with Atiqur Rahman Usmani, Hamid al-Ansari Ghazi and Saeed Ahmad Akbarabadi. He was appointed the general secretary of the Jamiat Ulama-e-Hind in 1942 after Abdul Haleem Siddiqi.

Seoharwi died of cancer on 2 August 1962. His funeral prayer was led by Qari Muhammad Tayyib, the Principal of Darul Uloom Deoband. Tributes came from Indian Prime Minister Jawaharlal Nehru, ministers, and dozens of other members of the Indian Parliament. His funeral prayer was witnessed by a crowd of two hundred thousand people. His resting place is located in Munhadiyan, New Delhi where Shah Waliullah Dehlawi is also buried. Hifzur Rahman Academy in Jeddah was established in his memory.

== Literary works ==
Seoharwi‘s books include:

- Akhlaq aur Falsafa-e-Akhlaq
- Balagh-e-Mubeen
- Islam ka iqtesadi Nizam
- Qasas al-Quran

== See also ==
- List of Deobandis

== Bibliography ==
- Hifzur RahmanSeoharvi ki Ilmi Khidmaat ka Tejqiqi Jaiza
- Shahjahanpuri, Abu Salman (May 2001). Mujāhid-e-Millat Mawlānā Hifzur Rahman Seohārwi: Ek Siyāsi Mutāla (in Urdu) (1 ed.). Lahore: Jamiat Publications.
