= Muhammad Taqi Amini =

Indian Islamic Scholar

- Born: 5 May 1926; Subeha, Barabanki, United Provinces of British India
- Died: 21 January 1991 (aged 64); Aligarh, Uttar Pradesh, India
- Title: Professor, Mawlāna

Academic background
- Education: Madrasa Aminia

Academic work
- Discipline: Fiqh
- Institutions: Aligarh Muslim University
- Main interests: Fiqh, Hadith
- Notable works: Fiqh-e-Islami Ka Tareekhi Pas-e-Manzar, Hadees Ka Dirayati Meyar

Religious life
- Religion: Islam
- Denomination: Sunni
- Jurisprudence: Hanafi
- Creed: Maturidi

Muslim leader
- Teacher: Kifayatullah Dihlawi

Muhammad Taqi Amīni ( 5 May 1926 – 21 January 1991) was an Indian Sunni Islamic scholar, jurist, Urdu author and the dean of Theology faculty of Aligarh Muslim University. He is known for his works on Islamic jurisprudence, and his book Fiqh Islami ka Tareekhi Pas-e-Manzar is a required reading for master's degree in Islamic studies at the Islamic University of Science & Technology.

Amīni was an alumnus of the Jami’ul Ulum, Kanpur and the Madrasa Aminia. During his career, he taught at Darul Uloom Nadwatul Ulama and served as the Principal at Darul Uloom Muiniya in Ajmer. He became a Dean Professor in the Theology faculty at Aligarh Muslim University and retired in 1986. He wrote books including Reconstruction of Culture and Islam, Ijtehad Ka Tareekhi Pas-e-Manzar and Ahkam-e-Sharia Mai Halat-o-Zamana Ki Ri'ayat.

== Biography ==
Muhammad Taqi Amīni was born on 5 May 1926 in Subeha, Barabanki, United Provinces of British India (now Uttar Pradesh). He acquired his primary education in local madrassas and then went to Jami’ul Ulum in Kanpur. He completed his dars-e-nizami studies under Kifayatullah Dihlawi at Madrasa Aminia in Delhi.

Amīni started teaching at Madrasa Subhania Delhi, Darul Uloom Nadwatul Ulama and Jami'ul-Uloom in Kanpur. He moved to Nagpur in 1950, where he taught in Madrasa Sanwiya and High School for about 6 years and then moved to Ajmer in 1956 to teach at Darul Uloom Muinia where he became Principal and Shaykh al-Hadith. His career in Darul Uloom Muinia lasted for about seven years and he mainly taught Hadith sciences. At the request of Saeed Ahmad Akbarabadi, Amīni joined Aligarh Muslim University (AMU) as a lecturer in the department of Sunni Theology in 1964. He became a professor and department head, then the Dean of the Faculty of Theology, and stayed at the AMU until 1986. However, the Vice Chancellor of the AMU, Sayyid Hashim Ali extended his post up to 1989. Amīni was a member of Majlis Tahqeeqat-e-Shariah, a jurisprudence council established by Abul Hasan Ali Nadwi. Amīni died on 21 January 1991 in Aligarh.

At the AMU, Javed Ahsan Falahi wrote a doctoral thesis entitled Mawlana Muhammad Taqi Amīni: Life and Contributions.

== Understanding of punishment ==
In Punishment of Apostasy in Islam, S. A. Rahman says that, according to Amini,

the scope of hudud [divinely mandated punishments] must be confined to Quranic prescriptions only and all other punishments should be classified in the category of tazir [discretionary]. There might be crimes for which punishments were prescribed during the times of first four Caliphs of Islam, and for which the claim of finality may be made on the basis of previous consensus. But, timely circumstances would justify their revision in accordance with explicit texts.

== Literary works ==
Amīni's books include:

- Ahkam-e-Sharia Mai Halat-o-Zamana Ki Ri'ayat
- Fiqh-e-Islami Ka Tareekhi Pas-e-Manzar
- Hadees Ka Dirayati Meyar
- Hikmatul Quran
- Ijtehad Ka Tareekhi Pas-e-Manzar
- Islam Ka Zar'i Nizam
- Ka’inat mai Insan ka Maqam
- La-mazhabi Daur Ka Tareekhi Pas-e-Manzar
- Muraslat: Ilmi wa Deeni
- Tahzib-e-Jadīd ki Tashkīl (transl. Reconstruction of Culture and Islam)

== See also ==
- List of Deobandis

== Bibliography ==
- Shahid, Muhammad; Amjad, Muhammad (2021). "Contemporary Concept of Inter Religious Harmony: Analytical Study of Mawlana Muhammad Taqi Amini's Thought". Al-Qamar (in Urdu). 4 (2): 553–560. ISSN 2664-4398.
- Adrawi, Asir (April 2016). Karwān-e-Rafta: Tazkirah Mashāhīr-e-Hind [The Caravan of the Past: Discussing Indian scholars] (in Urdu) (2nd ed.). Deoband: Darul Muallifeen.
- Khan, Jawed Ahmad (2012). Mawlānā Taqi Amīnī awr unki Fiqhi Khidmāt [Mawlānā Taqi Amīnī and his juristic contributions] (Thesis). Aligarh Muslim University. hdl:10603/63108.
- Khan, Anas Hassan (July–December 2016). "Six Monthly al-Irfan" (PDF). جدید معاشی مسائل اور اسلام (Modern economic issues and Islam). 1 (2). Archived from the original (PDF) on 10 April 2020.
