= Madina (Bijnor) =

- Type: Bi-weekly
- Founder: Maulvi Majeed Hasan
- Editor: Hamid al-Ansari Ghazi
- Founded: 1912
- Ceased publication: 1975
- Language: Urdu
- Headquarters: Bijnor
- Circulation: 12,500 (1922)

Akhbar-e-Madina (Urdu: اخبار مدینه), or Madina for short, was an Urdu-language biweekly anti-colonial newspaper published in Bijnor, India between 1912 and 1975.

The newspaper first appeared in 1912. It was founded by Maulvi Majeed Hasan, and its first editor was Hamid al-Ansari Ghazi. It had its own printing press, Madina Press.

It was one of the most prominent Muslim newspapers in the United Provinces. It won acceptance from the readers through its systematic arrangement of news items and high-quality calligraphy. Read across the Indian subcontinent, it played a significant role in shaping Muslim public opinion. Politically it was supportive of the Indian National Congress. It opposed the continuation of princely states, particularly the Bhopal State.

Madina's circulation in 1922 was 12,500. By 1927, it had dropped to 6,500; and by 1931, it was 6,000. The newspaper was published on the 1st, 5th, 9th, 13th, 17th, 21st, 25th and 28th of each month.

In the fall of 1942 Madina asked its readers to send letters on the Pakistan movement, and published these community views.

In the early 1960s, Saeed Akhtar became Madina's editor.
