= Dabhel =

- town
- Location in Gujarat, India
- Coordinates: 20°24′00.00″N 72°53′00.00″E
- Country: India
- State: Gujarat

Languages
  - Official: Gujarati, Hindi
- Time zone: UTC+5:30 (IST)
- Vehicle registration: GJ
- Website: gujaratindia.com

Dabhel is a town in Gujarat state of India. It is famous for its Islamic education, most notably given in Jamia Islamia Talimuddin.

Dabhel lies 25–30 km (16–19 mi) south of Surat and 10–15 km (6.2–9.3 mi) north of Navsari, to the east is Vesma crossroad on National Highway 8 and to the west is Maroli. Arabian Sea is approximately 20 km from west from Dabhel.

More than 90% inhabitants of Dabhel are of the Sunni sect. A proportion of Harijan do reside in Dabhel, however their numbers are dwindling as they move away.

Nearest train station is Maroli on the Western Railway of India, which is west of Dabhel. To the east is Vesma cross roads on the National Highway 8, which links to Mumbai and Baroda.

== Notable people ==
- Shabbir Ahmad Usmani
