= Ambehta =

- Town
- Location in Uttar Pradesh, India
- Coordinates: 29°52′23″N 77°20′28″E
- Country: India
- State: Uttar Pradesh
- District: Saharanpur

Population (2011)
  - Total: 15,739

Languages
  - Official: Hindi
- Time zone: UTC+5:30 (IST)
- Postal code: 247340
- Vehicle registration: UP-11

Ambehta is a town and a nagar panchayat in the Saharanpur district in the state of Uttar Pradesh, India.

== Demographics ==
As of the 2011 India census, Ambehta had a population of 15,739. Males constitute 51.75% of the population and females 48.24%. Ambehta has an average literacy rate of 62.27%, lower than the national average of 74.04%; with 69.75% of the males and 54.25% of females literate. 16.46% of the population is under 6 years of age.

== Notable residents ==
- Abidullah Ghazi, a prominent Muslim author and scholar
- Khalil Ahmad Anbahtawi Saharanpuri, Islamic scholar
