= Syed Mahmud =

Indian politician (1889–1971)

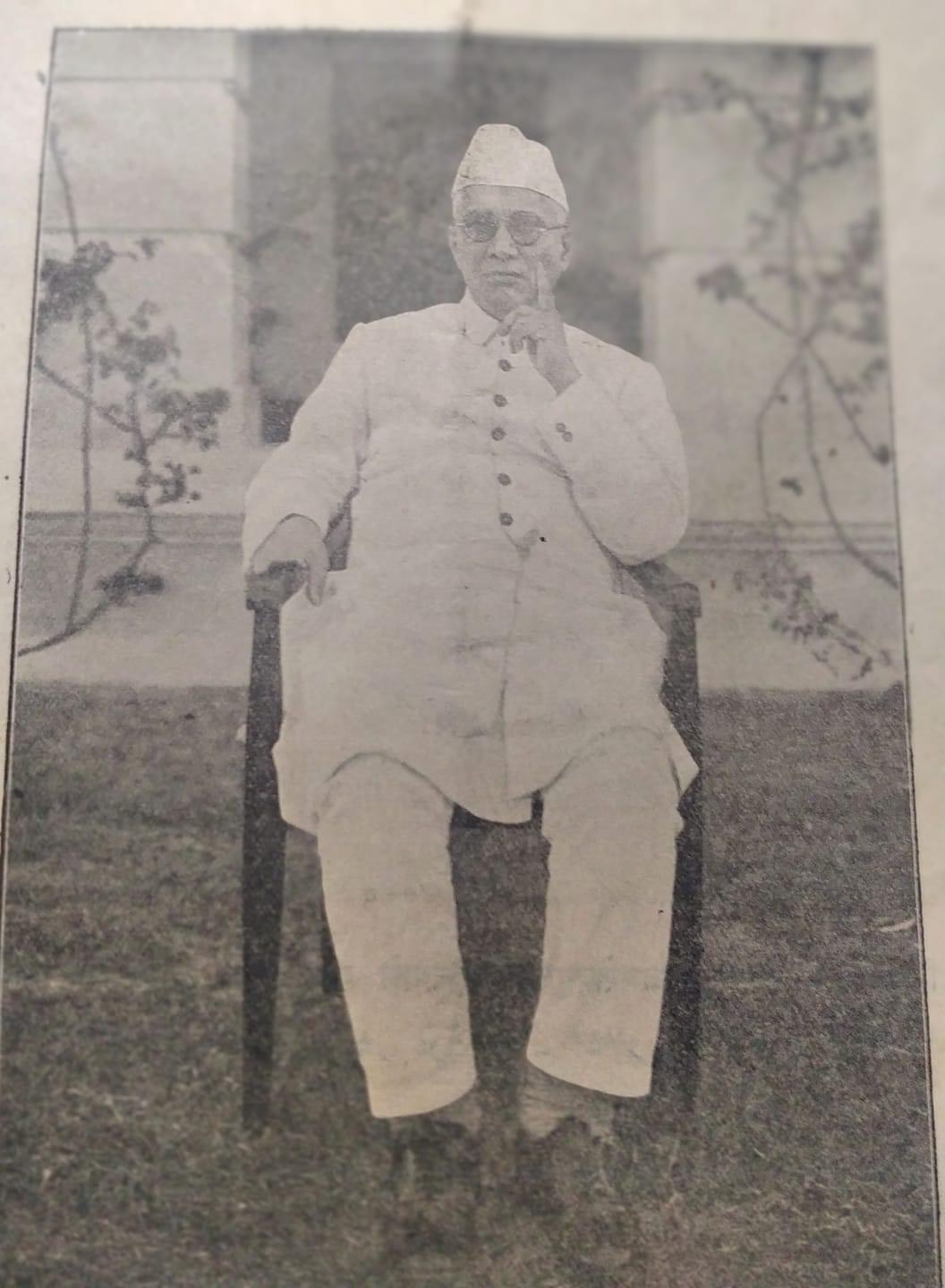

General Secretary, Central Khilafat Committee
- In office 1921–1936

General Secretary, All India Congress Committee
- In office 1923–1923
- In office 1929–1936

Minister of Education and Development, Bihar
- In office 1937–1939

Member of Bihar Legislative Assembly
- In office 1937–1939
- In office 1946–1952

Member of All India Congress Committee Working Committee
- In office 1940–1945

Minister of Development and Transport, Bihar
- In office 1946–1952

Minister of External Affairs
- In office December 1954 – April 1957

Personal details
- Born: 1889 Syedpur Bhitri, Ghazipur, United Province, British India (present day) Uttar Pradesh, India
- Died: 1971 (aged 81–82)
- Party: Indian National Congress
- Spouse: R. F. Mahmud
- Children: 3 Son and 3 Daughter
- Parent: Moulvi Mohamed Omar
- Profession: Barrister-at-Law

Syed Mahmud (1889–1971) was an Indian politician and senior leader in the Indian National Congress during the Indian independence movement and in post-independence India.

He was a member of the foundation committee of Jamia Millia Islamia.

== Early life ==
Syed Mahmud was born in Syedpur Bhitari, Ghazipur district of India. He was educated at the Aligarh Muslim University. During his time at the university, Mahmud became involved in student political activities and attended the 1905 session of the Indian National Congress, the largest Indian nationalist organisation in what was then British-ruled India. Along with fellow student and later political leader, Dr. Saifuddin Kitchlew, Mahmud was amongst the Muslim students who opposed the pro-British loyalties of the All India Muslim League and were drawn more to the nationalist Congress. After being expelled from Aligarh for his political activities, Mahmud travelled to England and studied law at Cambridge University before going on to study at Lincoln's Inn to become a barrister. In 1909, in London he came in contact with Mahatma Gandhi and J.L. Nehru. In 1912, he obtained Ph.D. from Germany and came back to India, and from 1913 he started his legal profession in Patna under the able guidance of Mazharul Haq. In 1915, he married Mazharul Haq's niece. After practising law for a few years, he was soon drawn into the strengthening movement for India's independence.

== Political career ==
Syed Mahmud was one of the young Muslim leaders who played a role in crafting the 1916 Lucknow Pact between the Congress and the Muslim League. He participated in the Indian Home Rule Movement in 1916 and in the Non-cooperation movement and the Khilafat movement under the influence and leadership of Mahatma Gandhi. In 1923 he was elected to the post of deputy general secretary of the All India Congress Committee. In 1930, he was imprisoned in Allahabad along with Indian leader Jawaharlal Nehru during the Civil disobedience movement.

Throughout his career he insisted on communal harmony, played significant role in the Congress- League Pact of Lucknow in 1916. Served with the Home Rule League, AICC and gave up his legal practice to participate in the Khilafat Movement. He also authored, The Khilafat & England. In 1922, he was imprisoned. In 1923, he was elected Deputy General Secretary of the AICC along with Jawaharlal Nehru which resulted in close friendship between the two leaders. Nehru signed as witness at the marriage of Syed Mahmud's daughter. In 1929, with M.A. Ansari, he formed `Muslim Nationalist Party' within the Congress, and became the General Secretary of the Congress, and served in this capacity till 1936. In 1930, along with M.L. Nehru and J.L. Nehru he was imprisoned in the Naini Jail of Allahabad, for his participation in the Civil Disobedience Movement.

The Sri Krishna Sinha led cabinet in Bihar made Syed Mahmud Minister for Education, Development and Planning in 1937. His emphasis was on providing primary education to largest possible number of people, worked for revision of curricula, appointed Urdu teachers in the Patna University. He fought for raising the proportion of Muslims in the government jobs and in the local bodies.

After the sweeping Congress victory in the 1937 central and provincial elections, Syed Mahmud was considered one of the leading prospective candidates to serve as Chief Minister of Bihar but instead eminent nationalists Anugrah Narayan Sinha and Shri Krishna Sinha were called from Central Legislative Assembly(Council of Estates) and groomed for Chiefministership.The succession of fellow Bihari Congressman Srikrishna Sinha to the post over Mahmud caused some controversy, but Mahmud joined Sinha's government as a cabinet minister and was accorded third place in the cabinet.

To mitigate the Hindi-Urdu tension, he launched a bilingual (Urdu; Hindi) newspaper called Raushni. He also wrote a book, A Plan of Provincial Reconstruction (1939). It became so popular that several editions were re-printed in the same year. It displays his vision for the problems like public health, education and human resources, material resources of Bihar. This book dealt at length about rural indebtedness and agricultural finance. He was engaged in such exercise when other big leaders of Bihar were engaged in caste based factionalism, much lamented by Ram Manohar Lohia, Jaya Prakash Narayan and Sahajanand Saraswati.

Mahmud was one of the members of the Congress Working Committee that endorsed the 1942 Quit India movement, calling for an immediate end to British rule. From August 1942, Mahmud and all of the other top leaders of the Quit India movement were imprisoned, mostly in Ahmednagar Fort. To the surprise of his fellow detainees, the government released Mahmud in October 1944. Initially he implied that he didn't know why he had been freed. Then the British authorities released to the press a letter that he had written to the Viceroy of India. In the letter Mahmud denied participating in the passage of the Quit India Resolution. His colleagues, who would remain imprisoned until May 1945, felt angry and betrayed. Mahmud met with Gandhi, and afterwards apologized for writing the letter and letting down his friends and the movement. Mahmud's standing with Indian nationalists improved over the succeeding years. He was one of the secular Muslim leaders who opposed the Muslim League's demand for the creation of a separate Muslim state of Pakistan, and worked with other Indian leaders against the resulting communal violence between Muslims and Hindus in Bihar and other parts of India.

=== Post-independence ===
During 1946–52, Syed Mahmud was the Minister for Transport, Industries and Agriculture in Bihar. In 1949 he suggested Nehru to enter into a particular military pact with Pakistan in order to safeguard the nation from China which could not materialize. Pained with communal partition of India, an optimist in him motivated him to write another book Hindu Muslim Accord (1949), celebrating the `Ganga-Jamuni Tehzeeb of India'. From 7 December 1954 to 17 April 1957 he was the Union Minister of State for External Affairs but resigned due to eye troubles. He participated in the historic Bandung Conference (1955), where the Panchsheel was spelled out. He played remarkable roles in India's useful diplomatic relations with the Gulf countries, Iran and Egypt.

After India's independence, Syed Mahmud was elected to the first Lok Sabha (lower house of the Indian Parliament) from the constituency of Champaran-East in Bihar and second Lok Sabha from the constituency of Gopalganj in Bihar. He served as the deputy Minister of External Affairs between 1954 and 1957 and represented India at the Bandung Conference.
