= Jamia Islamia Talimuddin =

Indian Islamic seminary in Gujarat

Jamiah Islamiyyah Ta'leemuddeen Dabhel Simlak
- Type: Islamic university
- Established: 1908
- Founders: Maulana Ahmad Hasan Bham Simlaki Rh.
- Chancellor: Maulana Ahmad Maulana Muhammad saeed Buzurg Simlaki
- Students: 1000
- Location: Dabhel, India
- Campus: Urban
- Website: Official website

Jamiah Islamiyyah Ta'leemuddeen Dabhel (or Dabhel Jamiah Islamiyyah or Jamiah Islamiyyah Dabhel) is a Deobandi Islamic seminary in Dabhel, Gujarat, India.

== Education pattern ==
The Jamiah has the following departments:

- Nazirah-e-Qur'an (reading the Qur'an)
- Tahfeez-ul-Qur'an (memorizing the Qur'an)
- Department of Tajweed (Quranic phonetics)
- Department of Islamic Law (Mufti)
- Department of Islamic Jurisprudence (Fiqh)
- Department of Hadith
- Department of Tafsir
- Department of Arabic language
- Department of Persian language
- Department of Deviant Sects

== Notable alumni ==
- Yousuf Banuri
- Azizul Haque
- Muhammad Saeed Buzurg Simlaki, Former Mohtamim of the Jamiah
- Muhammed Malik Kandhalwi
- Syed Azhar Shah Qaiser
- Abdul Hai Ismail bismillah, Former teacher and Mohtamim of the Jamia
- Ebrahim Desai
- Ghulam Ullah Khan
- Abdullah Patel Kapodrawi
- Ahmed Maulana Muhammad Saeed Buzurg. (Mohtamim Of Jamiah)
- Abdurrahman Buzurg (Nayab Mohtamim)

== See also ==
- Darul Uloom Deoband
- Darul Uloom Karachi
- Darul Uloom London
- Ahmed Khanpuri
