= Bangra Upazila =

Upazila in Chittagong Division, Bangladesh

Bangra বাঙ্গরা
- Upazila
- Bangara
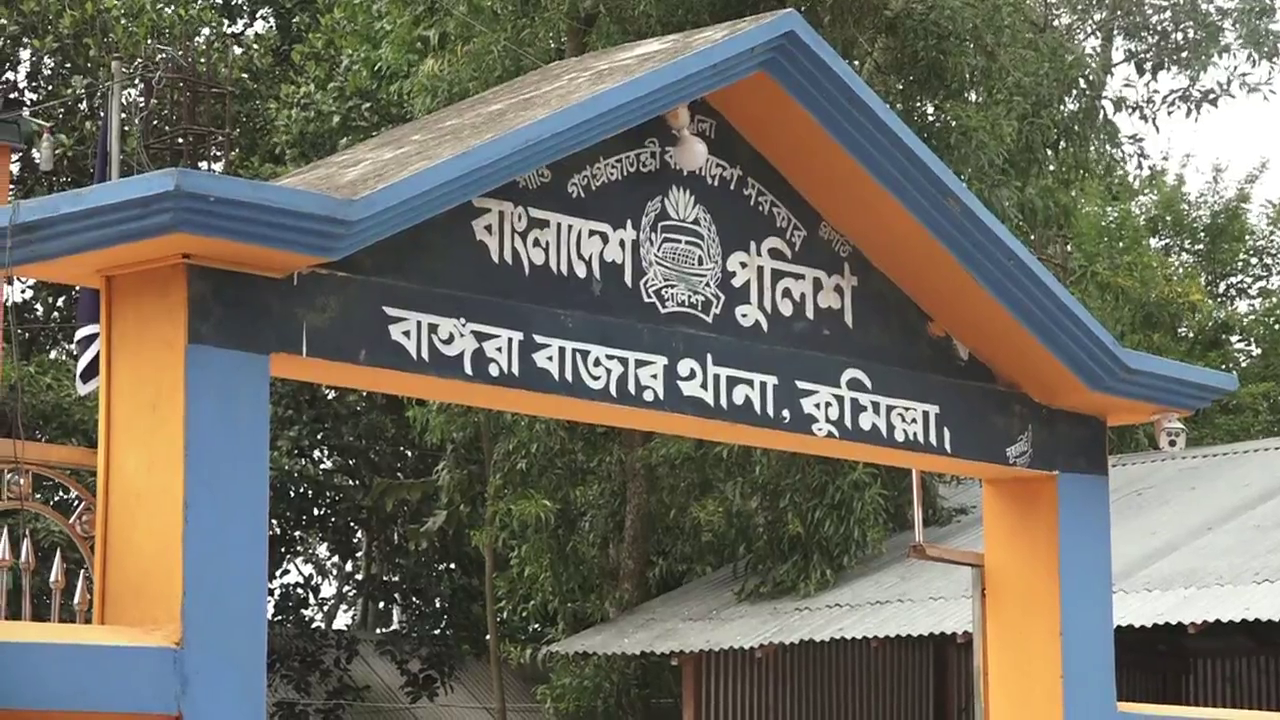
- Entrance gate of Bangra Bazar Police Station, Bangra Upazila
- Country: Bangladesh
- Division: Chittagong
- District: Comilla
- Jatiya Sangsad constituency: Comilla-3
- Thana: 2015
- Upazila: 2026

Government
  - Body: Upazila Council
  - MP: Kazi Shah Mofazzal Hossain Kaikobad
  - Chairman: Vacant

Area
  - Total: 189 km^{2} (73 sq mi)
- Time zone: UTC+6 (BST)
- Postal code: 3543
- Area code: 03022
- Website: bangara.cumilla.gov.bd

Bangra (Bengali: বাঙ্গরা) is an upazila of Comilla District in Chittagong Division, Bangladesh.

== Geography ==
It is surrounded by Nabinagar Upazila of Brahmanbaria District to the north, Muradnagar Upazila to the south, Brahmanpara, Debidwar and Kasba Upazila of Brahmanbaria District on the east, Homna Upazila and Bancharampur Upazila of Brahmanbaria District on the west.

== Administration ==
Bangra Upazila is divided into 10 union councils. All unions are under Bangrabazar Thana.

- Srikail Union
- Akubpur Union
- Andikot Union
- Purbadhair East Union
- Purbadhair West Union
- Bangra East Union
- Bangra West Union
- Chapitala Union
- Ramchandrapur North Union
- Tonki Union

== See also ==
- Bangrabazar Thana
- Comilla District
