= Bangra (disambiguation) =

Bangra may refer to:

- Bangra Upazila, a Upazila in Comilla District
  - Bangrabazar Thana, a thana in Bangra Upazila
- Bangra Union, a union in Tangail District
