= Madani Square =

Monument in Sylhet, Bangladesh

Madani Chattar
- মাদানী চত্বর
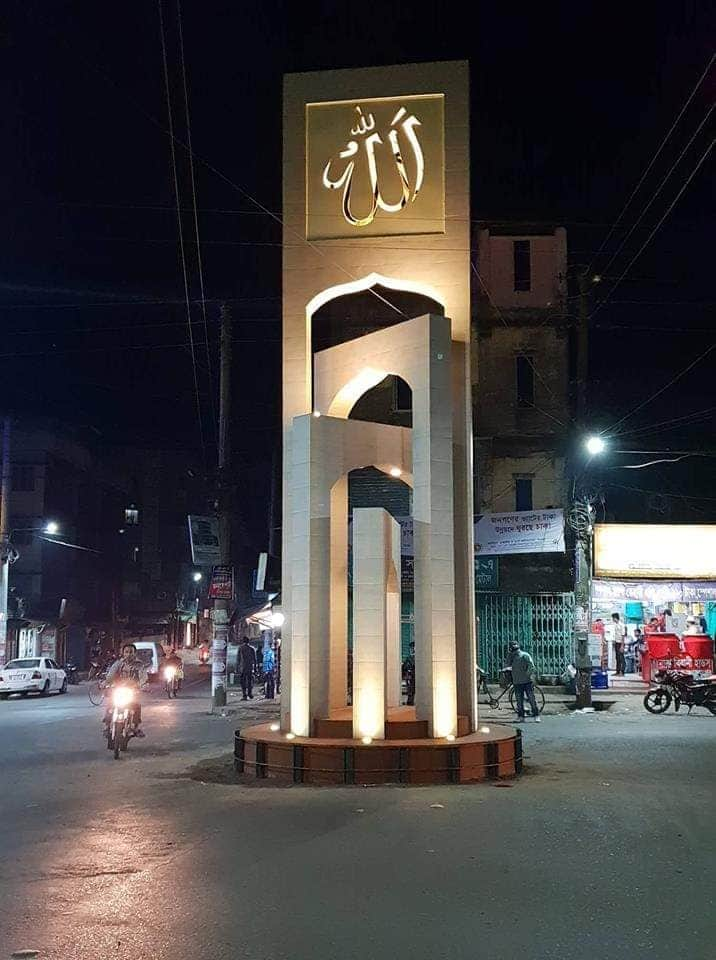
- Location: Nayasarak Road, Sylhet, Bangladesh
- Coordinates: 24.8994°N 91.8748°E
- Designer: Jishnu Kumar Das (Nirmanik Architects)
- Type: Monument
- Opening date: 18 February 2019
- Dedicated to: Hussain Ahmad Madani

Madani Square, (Bengali: মাদানী চত্বর, romanized: Madani Chottor, lit. 'Madani Square'), also known as Madani Chattar or Madani Point, is a monument in Nayasarak Road in Sylhet built to commemorate Hussain Ahmad Madani's contributions towards dawah in Sylhet, Bangladesh. It was completed and opened on 18 February 2019 replacing the junction marking Nayasarak Point.

== Construction and history ==
In early August 2017, the mayor of Sylhet City Corporation, Ariful Haque Choudhury announced his plans to build a monument on Nayasarak Point and to rename it Madani Chattar, after the Islamic scholar Hussain Ahmad Madani.

The monument was designed by Bangladeshi architect Jishnu Kumar Das.

Due to the point being opposite Noyasharak Jame Masjid – a mosque in which the scholar visited and stayed in since 1922, teaching the local community about Islam. During the opening ceremony, Asjad Madani, the scholar's son was also present.

== Structure ==
The structure contains four pillars, designed like mihrabs, which increase in size and a circular base. The tallest one contains a square where the Arabic word "Allahu" is written. The chattar also contains lights which operate at night.

== See also ==
- Allah Chattar, a similar monument built later in Muradnagar
- Shapla Square
