= Razzaqul Haider Chowdhury =

Pakistani lawyer, banker, and politician from East Pakistan

Khan Bahadur Razzaqul Haider Chowdhury

Provincial Minister of Health and Prisons of East Pakistan
- In office 15 May 1954 – 29 May 1954
- Prime Minister: A. K. Fazlul Huq
- Preceded by: Mafizuddin Ahmad
- Succeeded by: A. K. M. Zahirul Huq

Personal details
- Born: 1896
- Died: 4 March 1969 (aged 72–73) Dacca, East Pakistan, Pakistan
- Party: Independent
- Other political affiliations: KSP (1953–1958)
- Relations: Mafizuddin Ahmad (co-parents-in-law)
- Children: 2 sons and 9 daughters
- Profession: Lawyer, banker

Razzaqul Haider Chowdhury (1896 – 4 March 1969) was a Pakistani lawyer, banker, and politician. He served as Provincial Minister of Health and Prisons of East Pakistan in 1954 and as a member of the National Assembly of Pakistan from 1962.

== Early life and education ==
Chowdhury was born in 1896. He was one of four siblings. After completing his education in Calcutta, he entered the legal profession.

== Career ==
Chowdhury's political career began in the late 1920s. He served as chairman of the Noakhali District Board and was elected to the Bengal Legislative Assembly following provincial elections. He was a supporter of the Pakistan Movement.

Following the partition of India, Chowdhury joined the Krishak Sramik Party (KSP). In the 1954 provincial election, he was elected from the Noakhali Sadar Central-North constituency and became a member of the East Bengal Legislative Assembly for the second time. He was appointed Provincial Minister of Health and Prisons of East Pakistan as a member of the Third Huq ministry. He held that position from 15 May 1954 to 29 May 1954.

In 1962, Chowdhury contested the general election and was elected from the NE-69 Noakhali-2 constituency, becoming a member of the National Assembly of Pakistan. In 1965, he became one of the founding members of the board of directors of the Eastern Banking Corporation.

== Personal life ==
Chowdhury had two sons and nine daughters. He was a co-parents-in-law of Bangladeshi politician Mafizuddin Ahmad.

== Death ==
Chowdhury died on 4 March 1969 in Dacca, East Pakistan, Pakistan (present-day Dhaka, Bangladesh).
