= Mafizuddin Ahmad =

Bengali politician and former Minister of East Pakistan

Khan Bahadur Maulvi Mafizuddin Ahmad
- মফিজউদ্দীন আহমদ

Minister for Education in East Pakistan
- In office 1962–1965
- Preceded by: Abul Mansur Ahmad
- Succeeded by: S. M. Amzad Hossain

Minister of Relief, Rehabilitation, Registration and Prisons
- Incumbent
- Assumed office 1947

Member of the Constituent Assembly of Pakistan
- In office 10 August 1947 – 1958
- Constituency: Tippera North

Member of the Bengal Legislative Assembly
- In office 1937–1947
- Constituency: Tippera North

Personal details
- Born: 1891 Barashalghar, Tipperah district, Bengal Presidency
- Died: 1979 (aged 87–88) Bangladesh
- Party: All-India Muslim League
- Children: A. B. M. Ghulam Mostafa
- Education: University of Dacca; University of Calcutta

Mafizuddin Ahmad (Bengali: মফিজউদ্দীন আহমদ; 1891–1979) was a Bengali politician and former government Minister of East Pakistan.

== Early life and education ==
Ahmad was born in 1891 in the village of Barashalghar, Debidwar, Tipperah district, Bengal Presidency. In 1919, he graduated from the University of Calcutta with a Bachelor of Arts in English. He received his Bachelor of Laws degree from the University of Dacca.

After graduation, Ahmed started his law practice in the Comilla bar, after meeting A. K. Fazlul Huq and Abul Kashem.

== Career ==
Ahmad in 1933 joined the All India Muslim League. He was elected joint secretary of the Muslim League in Tripura District. He was elected to the Bengal Legislative Assembly in 1938. He was made the parliamentary secretary for education. He was re-elected to the Bengal Legislative Assembly in 1946. He was given the title Khan Bahadur.

After the Partition of Bengal (1947) and establishment of Pakistan, he became the minister of Relief, Rehabilitation, Registration, and Prisons in East Pakistan. He was appointed to the Pakistan Planning Commission in 1954. He then served as the Minister for Education in East Pakistan from 1962 to 1965. He was awarded the Sitara-e-Quaid-e-Azam by the Government of Pakistan.

== Death ==
Ahmad died in 1979. His son A. B. M. Ghulam Mostafa was Bangladeshi businessman and politician who served as a Member of Parliament from Comilla-4.
