= A. B. M. Ghulam Mostafa =

Bangladeshi politician (1934–2022)

ABM Ghulam Mostafa

Member of Parliament
- In office 29 December 2008 – 9 January 2014
- Preceded by: Manjurul Ahsan Munshi
- Succeeded by: Razee Mohammad Fakhrul
- Constituency: Comilla-4

Personal details
- Born: 2 February 1934 Barasalghar, Debidwar Upazila, Comilla District, Bengal Province, British India
- Died: 3 December 2022 (aged 88)
- Party: Awami League
- Parent: Mafizuddin Ahmad (Father)

ABM Ghulam Mostafa (Bengali: এ বি এম গোলাম মোস্তফা; 2 February 1934 – 3 December 2022) was a Bangladeshi businessman and politician who served as a Member of Parliament from Comilla-4.

== Early life ==
Mostafa was born on 2 February 1934 in Comilla, Bengal Presidency, British Raj. His father, Mafizuddin Ahmad, was the Minister of Education. He completed his bachelor's degree and Masters in Economics from the University of Dhaka in 1954 and 1955.

== Career ==
Mostafa completed the Pakistan Civil Service examination in 1956. He served at a number of posts in the civil service of Pakistan. He was a member of the first Pay Commission of Bangladesh. He served as the Minister of Energy and Natural Resources and the Minister of Flood Control and Water Resource in 1988. He was elected to Parliament from Comilla-4 as a candidate of Bangladesh Awami League. He was Chairman of AFC group and Shakti Aushadhaloy.

== Death ==
ABM Ghulam Mostafa died on 3 December 2022, at the age of 88.
