= Razee Mohammad Fakhrul =

Nominate By Awami League

- রাজী মোহাম্মদ ফখরুল

Member of the Bangladesh Parliament for Comilla-4
- In office 6 January 2014 – 29 January 2024
- Preceded by: ABM Ghulam Mostafa
- Succeeded by: Abul Kalam Azad

Personal details
- Born: 5 August 1979 (age 46) Comilla
- Party: Bangladesh Awami League
- Parent: AFM Fakhrul Islam Munshi (father)

Razee Mohammad Fakhrul (born 5 August 1979) is a Bangladesh Awami League politician and former member of parliament. He is nominated by Bangladesh Awami League again on November 26, 2023.

== Career ==
Fakhrul majored in accounting in a college in the United States. He was elected upazila chairman from Debidwar in 2008. He is a member of parliament and member of the Parliamentary Standing committee on Foreign Affairs. He was elected to the 10th parliament from Comilla-4 as an independent candidate.

== Personal life ==
Fakhruls' grandfather, Ahmed Ali Sarder, was a member of the Pakistan National Assembly. His father, AFM Fakhrul Islam Munshi, was twice elected to the parliament of Bangladesh.
