= A. F. M. Fakhrul Islam Munshi =

Bangladeshi politician (1947–2023)

- আফম ফখরুল ইসলাম মুন্সী

Member of Parliament
- In office 7 May 1986 – 6 December 1990
- Preceded by: Dewan Sirajul Huq
- Succeeded by: Manjurul Ahsan Munshi
- Constituency: Comilla-4

Minister of Shipping and Finance
- In office 1988–1990

Personal details
- Born: 29 November 1947 Debidwar, Tippera District, Chittagong Division, East Bengal, Pakistan
- Died: 21 October 2023 (aged 75) Dhaka, Bangladesh
- Party: Bangladesh Awami League
- Other political affiliations: Jatiya Party
- Children: 2, including Razee Mohammad Fakhrul

A. F. M. Fakhrul Islam Munshi (29 November 1947 – 21 October 2023) was a Bangladesh Awami League politician and a member of parliament for Comilla-4 from 1986 to 1990.

== Career ==
Munshi was elected to parliament from Comilla-4 as a Jatiya Party candidate in 1986 and 1988. He served as the minister of shipping and finance in the cabinet of President Hussain Mohammad Ershad. He joined the Awami League after his term ended. He was the president of the Bangladesh Agro Processors Association.

== Personal life and death ==
Munshi had two sons; the elder son Raquib Mohammad Fakhrul is a businessman, and alumnus of Harvard Business School. Younger son Razee Mohammad Fakhrul is a member of parliament from the Bangladesh Awami League.

Following a stroke, A. F. M. Fakhrul Islam Munshi died in Dhaka on 21 October 2023, at the age of 75.
