= Allah Chattar =

Monument in Muradnagar, Bangladesh

- আল্লাহ চত্বর
- Interactive map of Allah Chattar
- Location: Allahu Chattar, Muradnagar Upazila, Comilla District, Bangladesh
- Coordinates: 23.6389°N 90.9309°E
- Type: Monument
- Width: 14 ft (4.3 m)
- Height: 30 ft (9.1 m)
- Completion date: September 2019
- Opening date: 7 September 2019
- Dedicated to: Islam

Allah Chattar (Bengali: আল্লাহ চত্বর, romanized: Allah Chottor) is a tower in Muradnagar, Comilla. It replaced the Doel Square.

== Location and history ==
Under the initiative of local politician Yussuf Abdullah Harun, plans to build a tower were announced. The politician mentioned that he designed the tower himself. It was officially opened by Harun on 7 September 2019 at 5pm. The square is located east of the Muradnagar bus stand on the four-road junction. It is bounded on the north-west by Homna Upazila, on the north-east by Ramchandrapur via Bancharampur Road, on the south by Muradnagar-Dhaka Road and on the east by Companyganj via Nabinagar Road.

== Structure and details ==
The circular tower contains the 99 names of Allah written in Arabic text. The name Allah is inscribed at the top. It is 30 feet high and 14 feet in diameter from the ground. The plaque is rich in six Arabic calligraphy terracotta.

== See also ==
- Madani Square, a similar monument built earlier in Sylhet
- Shapla Square
