= Manjurul Ahsan Munshi =

Bangladeshi politician

- মঞ্জুরুল আহসান মুন্সী

Member of Parliament
- In office 5 March 1991 – 27 October 2006
- Preceded by: A. F. M. Fakhrul Islam Munshi
- Succeeded by: ABM Ghulam Mostafa
- Constituency: Comilla-4

Personal details
- Party: Bangladesh Nationalist Party

Manjurul Ahsan Munshi is a former Bangladesh Nationalist Party politician who served as the Jatiya Sangsad member from Comilla-4 constituency in the 5th, 6th, 7th and 8th parliament.

== Career ==
In April 2006, Comilla district court stayed the six-month imprisonment sentence against Munshi in a contempt of court case. In February 2007, Bangladesh Army-led forces detained 14 Bangladesh Nationalist Party politicians, including Munshi, for their alleged links with crime and corruption. In October, a special court sentenced Munshi to 13 years in jail for acquiring wealth illegally and concealing information on his property. He was released in November 2008 on a High Court bail from the Dhaka Central Jail. In January 2009, a magistrate court sentenced another seven and a half years' imprisonment to him for violating code of electoral conduct during the polling on 29 December 2008.

In June 2011, following an appeal by Munshi, the High Court acquitted Munshi of the corruption charges. After hearing the Anti-Corruption Commission's appeal, the Supreme Court, in February 2015, scrapped the verdict of acquittal and directed the High Court to rehear the appeal of Munshi. But in May 2017, the High Court upheld its verdict acquitting Munshi of charges related to acquiring wealth illegally and concealing information of his property.

== Personal life ==
Munshi is married to Mazeda Ahsan. Together they have two sons, Rizviul Ahsan Munshi and Rizwanul Ahsan Munshi.

== Nomination Cancellation Controversy ==
In the 2026 Bangladeshi general election, Manjurul Ahsan Munshi received the nomination of the Bangladesh Nationalist Party for the Comilla-4 constituency. During the preliminary scrutiny, the concerned Returning Officer declared his nomination valid, however, rival candidate Hasnat Abdullah appealed to the Election Commission, alleging that Munshi had concealed information regarding loan default. Following the hearing, the Commission declared Munshi’s nomination invalid.

Munshi challenged the decision by filing writ petitions with the High Court Division and the Appellate Division of the Supreme Court of Bangladesh; however, both petitions were dismissed, rendering him ineligible to contest the election from the Comilla-4 constituency.

== Expulsion from BNP ==
In February 2026, Munshi was expelled from the BNP after a video circulated in which he was heard threatening voters during the campaign for the 2026 Bangladeshi general election. The party stated that his remarks and actions were "against party policy, ideals, and organization."
