= Harun-ar-Rashid =

Bangladeshi politician

- হারুন-আর-রশিদ

Member of 2nd Jatiya Sangsad
- In office 18 February 1979 – 12 February 1982
- Preceded by: Ali Azam
- Succeeded by: Kazi Shah Mofazzal Hossain Kaikobad

Personal details
- Born: Bhubanghar, Tippera District, Bengal Presidency
- Party: Bangladesh Nationalist Party
- Children: Yussuf Abdullah Harun

Harun-ar-Rashid (Bengali: হারুন-আর-রশিদ) is a Bangladeshi politician and a former member of parliament for Comilla-3.

== Personal life and family ==
Rashid married Noor Jahan, and they had a son named Yussuf Abdullah Harun, who is also a politician.

== Career ==
Rashid participated in the 1979 Bangladeshi general election as a Bangladesh Nationalist Party candidate for the Comilla-3 constituency.
