= Gangamandal Raj Institution =

Gongamondal Raj Institution
- গঙ্গামন্ডল রাজ ইনস্টিটিউশান

Location
- Comilla-Sylhet hwy, Jafarganj, Debidwar, Comilla; Bangladesh
- Coordinates: 23.5722°N 91.0528°E

Information
- Type: Private secondary school
- Motto: Enter to learn, go out for service
- Established: 1922
- Headmaster: Muslehuddin
- Grades: 6 to 10
- Gender: coed
- Enrollment: 900
- Language: Bengali
- Campus type: rural
- Colors: Black and White
- Website: gri.comillaboard.gov.bd
- Source: http://gri.comillaboard.gov.bd/

Gangamandal Raj Institution is a non government secondary school under Comilla Education Board. The school is located at Jafarganj under Debidwar Upazila in Comilla District. It was established in 1922 in British period by the Jamidars of Gangamandal Pargana. The school is situated near the eastern bank of the river Gumti and 20 kilometres (12 mi) north from Comilla town.
