= Yussuf Abdullah Harun =

Bangladeshi politician

Member of the Bangladesh Parliament for Comilla-3
- In office 29 January 2014 – 29 January 2024
- Preceded by: Kazi Shah Mofazzal Hossain Kaikobad
- Succeeded by: Jahangir Alam Sarkar

Personal details
- Born: 15 November 1947 (age 78)
- Party: Awami League (from 1995)
- Education: University of Dhaka

Yussuf Abdullah Harun (Bengali: ইউসুফ আবদুল্লাহ হারুন) is an Awami League politician and former member of parliament for Comilla-3.

== Early life and education ==
Harun was born on 15 November 1947 to a Bengali Muslim family in the village of Bhubanghar in Muradnagar, Tippera District. His father, Harun-or-Rashid, was also the MP of Comilla-3 from the Bangladesh Nationalist Party, and his mother's name is Noor Jahan Rashid. He matriculated from Comilla Zilla School in 1962 and earned an I.Com at Comilla Victoria College. In 1967, he completed a B.Com at the University of Dhaka. He is an F.C.A. fellow of the Institute of Chartered Accountants of Bangladesh.

== Career ==
Harun was a councilor of Dhaka Stock Exchange and president of the Federation of Bangladesh Chambers of Commerce and Industry in 1998.

Harun was the president of Federation of Bangladesh Chambers of Commerce and Industry in 2003. He is the chairman of Asia Insurance Limited.

On 20 April 2004, Harun received bail in a murder case. He had been accused of shooting a Bangladesh Nationalist Party activist during a clash with Awami League on 5 May 2002.

Harun was re-elected chairman of Asia Insurance Limited in 2011.

Harun was elected to parliament in 2014 as an independent candidate. He received 78,647 votes while his nearest rival, independent candidate Ahsanul Alam Kishor, received 56,336 votes. He is a member of the committee on estimates of the 10th Jatiya Sangsad. He took the initiative to help design and open the Allah Chattar in Muradnagar.

Harun was re-elected to parliament from Comilla-3 in 2018 as an Awami League candidate. He received 273,182 votes while his nearest rival, KM Mujibul Haque of Bangladesh Nationalist Party, received 12,358 votes.
