= Ali Azam (Comilla politician) =

Bangladeshi politician

Member of the Bangladesh Parliament for Comilla-3
- In office 7 April 1973 – 6 November 1975
- Succeeded by: Harun-ar-Rashid

Personal details
- Died: November 22, 2001
- Party: Awami League

Ali Azam was an Awami League politician and the member of parliament for Comilla-3 from 1973 to 1975.

== Biography ==
Azam was a lawyer. He was elected to the National Assembly of Pakistan for constituency Comilla-II in 1970. During the Bangladesh Liberation War he organized resistance against Pakistani forces in the Brahmanbaria region.

He was elected to the Bangladesh Parliament for Comilla-3 in 1973 on the nomination of the Awami League.

Azam died on 22 November 2001.
