= Comilla-4 =

Constituency of Bangladesh's Jatiya Sangsad

Coordinates: 23.60°N 90.99°E

- Constituency for the Jatiya Sangsad
- District: Comilla District
- Division: Chittagong Division
- Electorate: 410,559 (2026)

Current constituency
- Created: 1973
- Party: National Citizen Party
- Member: Hasnat Abdullah
- ← 251 Comilla-3 253 Comilla-5 →

Comilla-4 is a constituency represented in the Jatiya Sangsad (National Parliament) of Bangladesh since 2026 by Hasnat Abdullah of the National Citizen Party.

== Boundaries ==
The constituency encompasses Debidwar Upazila.

== History ==
The constituency was created for the first general elections in newly independent Bangladesh, held in 1973.

== Members of Parliament ==
Election	Member	Party
1973	Serajul Haque	Awami League
1979	Dewan Sirajul Huq	Bangladesh Nationalist Party
Major Boundary Changes
1986	AFM Fakhrul Islam Munshi	Jatiya Party
1991	Manjurul Ahsan Munshi	Bangladesh Nationalist Party
Jun 1996	Manjurul Ahsan Munshi	Bangladesh Nationalist Party
2001	Manjurul Ahsan Munshi	Bangladesh Nationalist Party
2008	ABM Ghulam Mostafa	Awami League
2014	Razee Mohammad Fakhrul	Independent
2018	Razee Mohammad Fakhrul	Awami League
2024	Abul Kalam Azad	Independent
2026	Hasnat Abdullah	National Citizen Party

== Elections ==
=== Elections in the 2020s ===
General Election 2026: Comilla-4
Party	Candidate	Votes	%	±%
NCP	Hasnat Abdullah	166,583		N/A
GOP	Jashim Munshi	49,885		N/A
Majority		116,698		N/A
Turnout				N/A
NCP gain from Independent				

=== Elections in the 2010s ===
General Election 2014: Comilla-4
Party	Candidate	Votes	%	±%
Independent	Razee Mohammad Fakhrul	32,804	42.0	N/A
JP(E)	Md. Ikbal Hossain Raju	28,536	36.5	N/A
Independent	Roshon Ali	16,808	21.5	N/A
Majority		4,268	5.5	−11.5
Turnout		78,147	28.7	−56.9
Independent gain from AL				

=== Elections in the 2000s ===
General Election 2008: Comilla-4
Party	Candidate	Votes	%	±%
AL	ABM Ghulam Mostafa	115,056	58.0	+20.2
BNP	Mrs. Mazeda Ahasan	81,365	41.0	−18.3
IAB	Md. Foyjur Rahman	918	0.5	N/A
Jatiya Samajtantrik Dal-JSD	Abdul Malek Ratan	537	0.3	N/A
BKA	Abul Farah Md. Abul Aziz	374	0.2	−0.1
Independent	Roshon Ali	145	0.1	N/A
Majority		33,691	17.0	−4.5
Turnout		198,395	85.6	+21.1
AL gain from BNP				

General Election 2001: Comilla-4
Party	Candidate	Votes	%	±%
BNP	Manjurul Ahsan Munshi	92,329	59.3	+22.9
AL	AFM Fakhrul Islam Munshi	58,877	37.8	+11.3
IJOF	Md. Iqbal Hossain	3,187	2.0	N/A
BKA	Md. Mahbubur Rahman Munsi	408	0.3	N/A
CPB	Paresh Ranjankar	334	0.2	N/A
Independent	Abu Taher Sarkar	268	0.2	N/A
Jatiya Party (M)	A. B. M. Jaher Sharif	140	0.1	N/A
Independent	A. Aziz	92	0.1	N/A
Independent	Md. Sultan Ahammad	60	0.0	N/A
Majority		33,452	21.5	+16.0
Turnout		155,695	64.5	−8.8
BNP hold				

=== Elections in the 1990s ===
General Election June 1996: Comilla-4
Party	Candidate	Votes	%	±%
BNP	Manjurul Ahsan Munshi	46,135	36.4	+7.1
JP(E)	ABM Ghulam Mostafa	39,209	30.9	+30.5
AL	AFM Fakhrul Islam Munshi	33,611	26.5	N/A
Jamaat	Md. Mostofa Hossain Sarkar	7,247	5.7	−9.9
IOJ	A. B. M. Jaher Sharif	671	0.5	N/A
Majority		6,926	5.5	+4.6
Turnout		126,873	73.3	+31.1
BNP hold				

General Election 1991: Comilla-4
Party	Candidate	Votes	%	±%
BNP	Manjurul Hasan Munshi	27,139	29.3	
NAP (Muzaffar)	Muzaffar Ahmed	26,299	28.4	
Independent	AFM Faqrul Islam Munshi	21,671	23.4	
Jamaat	Mostafa Sarkar	14,418	15.6	
Jatiya Samajtantrik Dal-JSD	Abdul Malek Ratan	1,161	1.3	
Zaker Party	Md. Anwar Hossain Bhuiyan	582	0.6	
BKA	Abdul Aziz Khomeni	462	0.5	
JP(E)	Shamsul Haq	335	0.4	
FP	Kh. Abdul Mannan	267	0.3	
Independent	Md. Mahbubur Rahman	169	0.2	
Majority		840	0.9	
Turnout		92,503	42.2	
BNP gain from JP(E)				
