= Dewan Sirajul Huq =

Bangladesh Nationalist Party politician

Member of Parliament
- In office 18 February 1979 – 12 February 1982
- Preceded by: Serajul Huq
- Succeeded by: A. F. M. Fakhrul Islam Munshi
- Constituency: Comilla-4

Personal details
- Born: Akhaura, Brahmanbaria
- Died: 3 September 2002 Dhaka, Bangladesh
- Party: Bangladesh Nationalist Party
- Education: MA- Philosophy

Dewan Sirajul Huq (Bengali: দেওয়ান সিরাজুল হক) was a Bangladesh Nationalist Party politician and a former member of parliament from Comilla-4 (at present Brahmanbaria-4). He was also one of the founding members of the Bangladesh Nationalist Party.

== Biography ==
Siajul Huq was born in Akhaura, Brahmanbaria. He passed his Intermediate and bachelor's from Comilla Victoria Government College. Sirajul Huq was the elected vice president of Comilla Victoria Government College Central Students Union. In 1969, he became the general secretary of East Pakistan Road Transport Corporation Workers' Union.

He was one of the founding members of the Bangladesh Nationalist Party. He was elected to parliament from Comilla-4 (at present Brahmanbaria-4) as a Bangladesh Nationalist Party candidate in 1979.

Sirajul Huq served as the general secretary of the Bangladesh Mazdoor Federation.
