= Kazi Shah Mofazzal Hossain Kaikobad =

Bangladeshi politician (born 1956)

- কাজী শাহ মোফাজ্জল হোসেন কায়কোবাদ
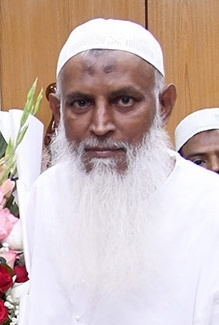
- Kaikobad in 2026

Minister of Religious Affairs
- Incumbent
- Assumed office 17 February 2026
- Prime Minister: Tarique Rahman
- Preceded by: A F M Khalid Hossain

Member of the Bangladesh Parliament for Comilla-3
- Incumbent
- Assumed office 17 February 2026
- Preceded by: Jahangir Alam Sarkar
- In office 23 June 1996 – 5 January 2014
- Preceded by: Rafiqul Islam Miah
- Succeeded by: Yussuf Abdullah Harun
- In office 7 May 1986 – 15 July 1990
- Preceded by: Harun-ar-Rashid
- Succeeded by: Rafiqul Islam Miah

Personal details
- Born: 20 February 1956 (age 70) Cumilla, East Pakistan, Pakistan
- Party: Bangladesh Nationalist Party
- Other political affiliations: Jatiya Party (Ershad)
- Occupation: Politician

Kazi Shah Mofazzal Hossain Kaikobad (born 20 February 1956) is a Bangladesh Nationalist Party politician. He is the incumbent and seven-term serving Jatiya Sangsad member representing the Comilla-3 constituency. He has been the incumbent minister for religious affairs since February 2026.

== Early life ==
Kaikobad was born on 20 February 1956 in Muradnagar, Comilla District.

== Political career ==
Kaikobad was first elected as a member of parliament in the 3rd Jatiya Sangsad election in 1986 as a nominee of the Jatiya Party, and he was elected again in 1988 for a second term.

He served as the state minister for religious affairs of Bangladesh from 2 May 1990 to 6 December 1990.

In the 5th National Parliament election in 1991, he ran as an independent candidate but was defeated by BNP candidate Rafiqul Islam.

On 12 June 1996, he was again elected as a member of parliament from the Comilla-3 constituency as a Jatiya Party candidate in the 7th National Parliament.

Later, he joined the Bangladesh Nationalist Party (BNP) and was elected as a member of parliament in the 8th National Parliament election in 2001 as a BNP nominee.

He again served as the state minister for religious affairs from 3 August 2002 to 1 July 2003.

He was elected as a member of parliament in the 9th National Parliament election in 2008.

In 2016, Kaikobad was appointed as a vice chairman of the Bangladesh Nationalist Party (BNP).

In the 13th national parliament election in 2026, he was elected as a member of parliament for the sixth time from the Comilla-3 constituency as a candidate of the Bangladesh Nationalist Party (BNP). On 17 February 2026, he was appointed as the minister for religious affairs in the cabinet of Tarique Rahman.

== Dhaka Grenade Attack ==
He was sentenced to life imprisonment for taking part in the 2004 Dhaka grenade attack that targeted former prime minister Sheikh Hasina. In 2014, he was a fugitive, reportedly in Thailand. In 2016, he was made one of 33 vice-chairman in the executive committee of BNP.

Interpol had issued a red notice for Kaikobad, but cancelled it on 4 May 2018 because it was not consistent with Interpol's constitution.

On 28 December 2024, he returned to Bangladesh after Sheikh Hasina's regime ended.
