= Usman Ghani Qasmi =

Indian Islamic scholar (1922–2011)

Allama, Mawlana Muhammad Usman Ghani Qasmi

Sheikh al-Hadith of Mazahir Uloom (Waqf), Saharanpur
- In office 1989–2011

Personal life
- Born: Muhammad Usman Ghani; 1922 Chilmil, Munger district, Bihar and Orissa Province, British India (now in Begusarai district, Bihar, India)
- Died: 13 January 2011 (aged 88–89) Saharanpur, India
- Notable work: Nasr al-Bari
- Education: Darul Uloom Deoband
- Occupation: Islamic scholar, teacher, author

Religious life
- Religion: Islam
- Denomination: Sunni
- Creed: Deobandi

Senior posting
- Teacher: Hussain Ahmed Madani, Ibrahim Balyawi, Izaz Ali Amrohi, Fakhrul Hasan Moradabadi

Muhammad Usman Ghani Qasmi (1922–2011) was an Indian Islamic scholar of the Deobandi tradition, a teacher, and an author. Born in Chilmil, Begusarai, he completed advanced studies at Darul Uloom Deoband and served at several seminaries in India, including a long tenure at Mazahir Uloom (Waqf), Saharanpur, from 1989 until his death. He also founded Madrasa Husayniyah in Chilmil, Begusarai.

== Early life and education ==
Muhammad Usman Ghani Qasmi was born in 1922 (1341 AH) in Chilmil, which was then part of Munger district in the Bihar and Orissa Province of British India. The area now falls within Begusarai district, Bihar, India. He received his early education in local madrasas in Begusarai and later moved to Bangladesh, where he studied at Madrasa Ashraf al-Ulum, Bara Katra, Dhaka.

Upon returning to India, he continued his studies at Madrasa Mu‘iniyah, Sanha, Begusarai, and then at Darul Uloom Imdadiyah, Darbhanga. In 1946, he enrolled in Darul Uloom Deoband for higher studies and graduated in 1950 (1369 AH). His teachers at Deoband included Hussain Ahmed Madani, Ibrahim Balyawi, Izaz Ali Amrohi, and Fakhrul Hasan Moradabadi.

== Career ==
After graduation, Qasmi began teaching in Bangladesh and also assisted his father in trade while engaging in reform work in his locality. In 1955, he was appointed at Madrasa Rashidul Uloom, Chatra, Jharkhand, where he taught Sahih Muslim and Jami‘ al-Tirmidhi. He later taught at Madrasa Husayniyah, Giridih, and Madrasa Husayniyah, Dighi, Bhagalpur.

In December 1962, he founded Madrasa Husayniyah in his hometown Chilmil, Begusarai, naming it after his teacher Madani. Construction began in 1972, and he also briefly taught there. From 1963 to 1975, he taught at Madrasa ‘Aliyah Furfura Sharif, Hugli, where he lectured on Sahih al-Bukhari and Tafsir al-Kashshaf.

In 1983, he joined Darul Uloom of Tarapur, Gujarat, where he taught Sahih al-Bukhari and Jami‘ al-Tirmidhi. After the institutional division of Mazahir Uloom in Saharanpur, Qasmi accepted an invitation from Muzaffar Husain Ajrarwi to join Mazahir Uloom (Waqf) in Shawwal 1409 AH (May 1989). He initially taught the second volume of Sahih al-Bukhari, and later also taught the first volume of Sahih al-Bukhari, the complete Sahih Muslim, and Sharh Ma‘ani al-Athar. He continued teaching at the institution for about twenty-two years until his death.

=== Spiritual life ===
Qasmi first pledged spiritual allegiance (bay‘ah) to his teacher Hussain Ahmed Madani, and later to Muzaffar Husain Ajrarwi, from whom he received ijazah in 1406 AH (April 1986).

== Literary works ==
Qasmi authored Nasr al-Bari, a 13-volume Urdu commentary on Sahih al-Bukhari, regarded as the first complete Urdu Sharh of the book before Tuhfat al-Qari by Saeed Ahmad Palanpuri. The first edition was published by Dar al-Ta’lif, Chilmil, followed by later editions from Zakariya Book Depot, Deoband.

Among his other writings are:

- Nasr al-Hayat (commentary on Mishkat al-Masabih)
- Dirayat al-Adab (on Hidayat al-Adab)
- Mir’at (on Mirqāt, logic)
- Faiz al-Imamain (6-volume commentary on Tafsir al-Jalalayn)
- Sharh Sharh ‘Aqa’id Nasafi (commentary on Sharh al-'Aqa'id al-Nasafiyya)
- Tafhīmat (commentary on Maqamat al-Hariri)
- A’inah-yi Huquq
- Hayat-i Shaykh al-Islam
- Guldasta-yi Zawjayn
- Awdah al-Adab

He also wrote explanatory notes on major hadith and tafsir texts, including Nasr al-Mun‘im (on Sahih Muslim), al-Taqrir al-Kafi (on Tafsir al-Baydawi), Nasr al-Ma‘bud (on Sunan Abi Dawud), and Tuhfat al-Bihari (on Sahih al-Bukhari).

He maintained a large register of about four hundred pages in which he systematically compiled examination questions on various Dars-e-Nizami texts for use in the semiannual and annual examinations of Islamic seminaries. The register included questions from works such as Sahih al-Bukhari, Sahih Muslim, Jami‘ al-Tirmidhi, Sunan Abi Dawud, Shama’il, Sunan al-Nasa’i, Ibn Majah, Muwatta Imam Muhammad, Muwatta Imam Malik, al-Hidayah, Bidayat al-Mubtadi, ad-Durr al-Mukhtar, Tafsir al-Baydawi, Tafsir al-Kashshaf, and many other standard texts of the curriculum.

=== Academic studies ===
In 2017, Fāiza Bashīr submitted an M.Phil thesis titled Nasr al-Bari Urdu Sharh Sahih al-Bukhari (Allama Uthman Ghani as a Scholar): An Analytical Study at the Sheikh Zayed Islamic Centre, University of the Punjab, Lahore. The study focuses on the methodology, structure, and scholarly value of Nasr al-Bari, while also providing an introductory overview of Qasmi’s life and academic contributions in its opening chapters.

== Personal life ==
Qasmi was married twice. His first wife died in 1955; they had three daughters, all of whom passed away during his lifetime. After her death, he married again and had three daughters and one son, Muhammad Imran Qasmi, who is still living. His second wife died two years before him, on 5 Ramadan 1430 AH (27 August 2009).

== Death ==
Qasmi died on 13 January 2011 (8 Safar 1432 AH). His funeral prayer was led by his son, Muhammad Imran Usmani, at the courtyard of Mazahir Uloom (Waqf), Saharanpur, and he was buried in the Haji Shah Kamaluddin graveyard beside his Sheikh Muzaffar Husain Ajrarwi.

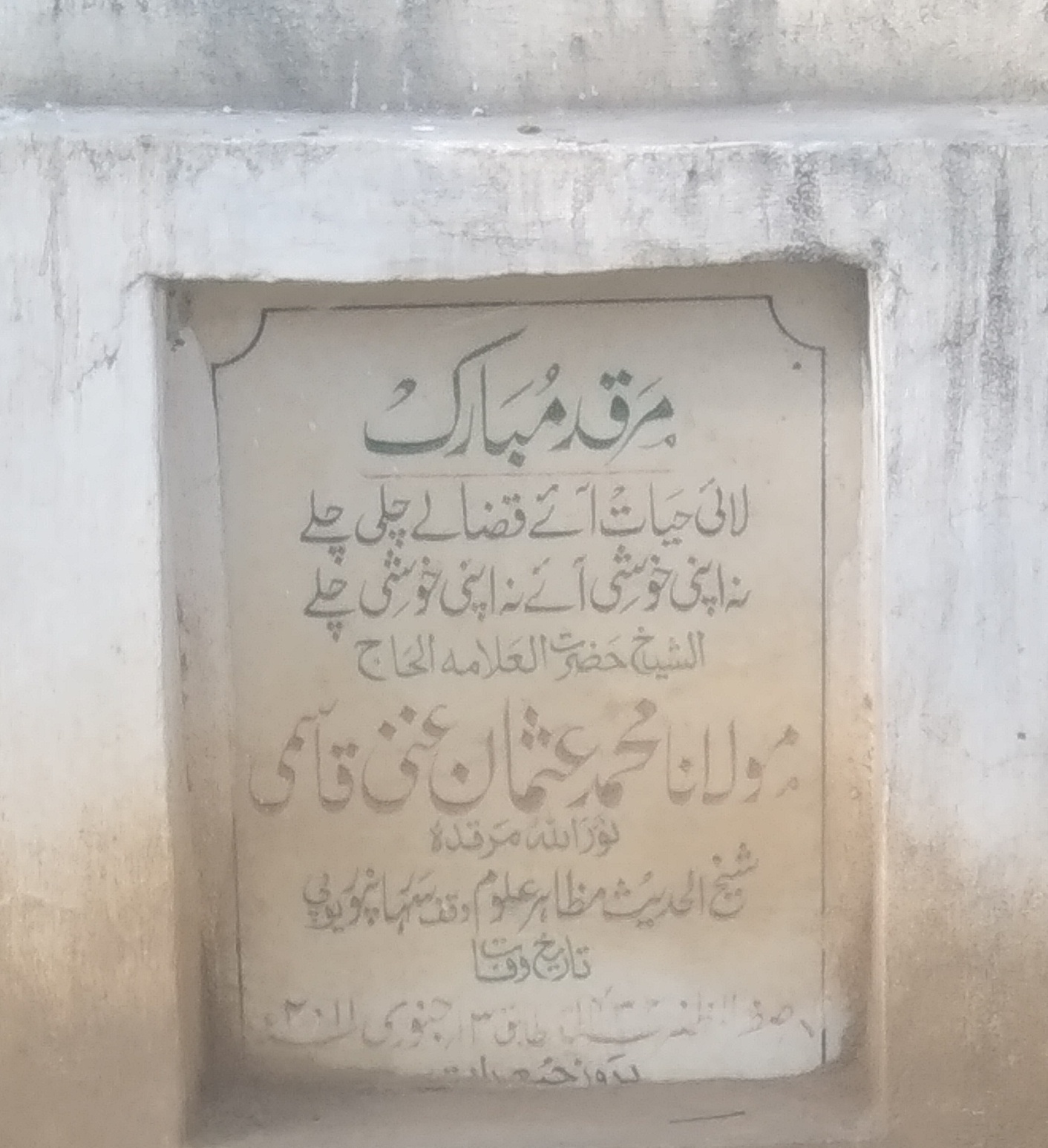
Inscription on Usman Ghani Qasmi's grave

== See also ==
- Darul Uloom Deoband
- Mazahir Uloom, Saharanpur
- List of Deobandis
