= Comilla-3 =

Constituency of Bangladesh's Jatiya Sangsad

Coordinates: 23.64°N 90.93°E

- Constituency for the Jatiya Sangsad
- District: Comilla District
- Division: Chittagong Division
- Electorate: 500,726 (2026)

Current constituency
- Created: 1973
- Party: Bangladesh Nationalist Party
- Member: Kazi Shah Mofazzal Hossain Kaikobad
- ← 250 Comilla-2 252 Comilla-4 →

Comilla-3 is a constituency represented in the Jatiya Sangsad (National Parliament) of Bangladesh since 2026 by Kazi Shah Mofazzal Hossain Kaikobad of the Bangladesh Nationalist Party.

== Boundaries ==
The constituency encompasses Muradnagar Upazila and Bangra Upazila.

== History ==
The constituency was created for the first general elections in newly independent Bangladesh, held in 1973.

== Members of Parliament ==
Election	Member	Party
1973	Ali Azam	Awami League
1979	Harun-or-Rashid	Bangladesh Nationalist Party
Major Boundary Changes
1986	Kazi Shah Mofazzal Hossain Kaikobad	Jatiya Party
1988	Kazi Shah Mofazzal Hossain Kaikobad	Jatiya Party
1991	Rafiqul Islam Miah	Bangladesh Nationalist Party
February 1996	Rafiqul Islam Miah	Bangladesh Nationalist Party
June 1996	Kazi Shah Mofazzal Hossain Kaikobad	Jatiya Party
2001	Kazi Shah Mofazzal Hossain Kaikobad	Bangladesh Nationalist Party
2008	Kazi Shah Mofazzal Hossain Kaikobad	Bangladesh Nationalist Party
2014	Yussuf Abdullah Harun	Independent
2018	Yussuf Abdullah Harun	Awami League
2024	Jahangir Alam Sarkar	Awami League
2026	Kazi Shah Mofazzal Hossain Kaikobad	Bangladesh Nationalist Party

== Elections ==
=== Elections in the 2010s ===
General Election 2014: Comilla-3
Party	Candidate	Votes	%	±%
Independent	Yussuf Abdullah Harun	78,647	57.7	N/A
Independent	Ahsanul Alam Kishor	56,336	41.4	N/A
JP(E)	Md. Aktar Hossain	1,214	0.9	+0.8
Majority		22,311	16.4	+10.3
Turnout		136,197	40.9	−43.6
Independent gain from BNP				

=== Elections in the 2000s ===
General Election 2008: Comilla-3
Party	Candidate	Votes	%	±%
BNP	Kazi Shah Mofazzal Hossain Kaikobad	124,386	52.3	−1.7
AL	Jahangir Alam	109,823	46.2	+4.4
BDB	Kamrul Hasan	1,488	0.6	N/A
IAB	Mojibur Rahman	1,443	0.6	N/A
Gano Front	Kamaluddin Bhuiyan	275	0.1	N/A
JSD	Md. Nure Alam	249	0.1	N/A
JP(E)	Md. Morshed Hayder	173	0.1	N/A
Majority		14,563	6.1	−6.1
Turnout		237,837	84.5	+19.5
BNP hold				

General Election 2001: Comilla-3
Party	Candidate	Votes	%	±%
BNP	Kazi Shah Mofazzal Hossain Kaikobad	107511	54.0	+23.7
AL	Yussuf Abdullah Harun	83301	41.8	+10.0
IJOF	Md. Golam Kibria Sarkar	2,906	1.5	N/A
Independent	Md. Rafiqul Islam Mia	1,640	0.8	N/A
Independent	Abdul Haq	1,047	0.5	N/A
NAP	Saiful Alam Mamun	698	0.4	N/A
Independent	Md. Shahidullah Sarkar	264	0.1	N/A
Independent	Md. Abdul Wahab	222	0.1	N/A
Independent	Idris Ali Sarkar	217	0.1	N/A
Independent	Md. Milon Sarkar	179	0.1	N/A
Independent	Kazi Mostakim Ahammed	123	0.1	N/A
BKA	Abdul Aziz Khomini Huzur	112	0.1	N/A
Independent	Kazi Shah Arefin	105	0.1	N/A
Independent	Kazi Junnan Basri	92	0.0	N/A
Independent	Kamrul Hasan Mikail	84	0.0	N/A
Bhasani Front	Enayet Karim	76	0.0	N/A
Independent	H. M. Rafiqul Islam	75	0.0	N/A
Independent	Md. Ali Akbar Rana	69	0.0	N/A
Bangladesh Vhashani Adarsha Bastabayana Parishad	Golam Faruk Sarkar	58	0.0	N/A
Independent	Chowdhury Rafiqul Haq	52	0.0	N/A
Independent	Md. Jalal Uddin	50	0.0	N/A
Independent	Kamal Uddin	47	0.0	N/A
Independent	Syed Ahmmad Hossain Awal	39	0.0	N/A
Independent	Syed Mostak Ahmed	35	0.0	N/A
Independent	Md. Nazmul Hossain	32	0.0	N/A
Independent	Mohammad Shah Alam Sarkar	30	0.0	N/A
Independent	Md. Khalilur Rahman	29	0.0	N/A
KSJL	Md. Amzad Hossain Bhuyan	28	0.0	N/A
Independent	A. K. M. Iqbal Kabir	22	0.0	N/A
Independent	Md. Ainul Haque	12	0.0	N/A
Majority		24,210	12.2	+9.8
Turnout		199,155	65.0	−10.6
BNP gain from JP(E)				

=== Elections in the 1990s ===
General Election June 1996: Comilla-3
Party	Candidate	Votes	%	±%
JP(E)	Kazi Shah Mofazzal Hossain Kaikobad	53,892	34.2	N/A
AL	Yusuf Abdullah Harun	50,063	31.8	−2.4
BNP	Rafiqul Islam Miah	47,763	30.3	−5.1
Jamaat	Md. Jasim Uddin Sarkar	3,579	2.3	N/A
Independent	Md. Rafiqul Islam	449	0.3	N/A
Zaker Party	Md. Shahid Ullah	386	0.2	N/A
Independent	Md. Abu Taher Molla	336	0.2	N/A
IOJ	Md. Ismail Zehadi	264	0.2	N/A
Independent	Qazi Siddiqur Rahman	259	0.2	N/A
Gano Forum	Nazrul Islam	174	0.1	N/A
Bangladesh Mehanati Front	M. A. Samad	173	0.1	N/A
Independent	Sheikh Kutub Uddin	85	0.1	N/A
Majority		3,829	2.4	+1.2
Turnout		157,423	75.6	+27.7
JP(E) gain from BNP				

General Election 1991: Comilla-3
Party	Candidate	Votes	%	±%
BNP	Rafiqul Islam Miah	46,380	35.4	
AL	Jahangir Alam	44,797	34.2	
Independent	Kazi Shah Mofazzal Hossain Kaikobad	34,963	26.7	
Bangladesh Janata Party	Kazi Zahangir Alam	2,186	1.7	
Independent	Md. Habibul Haq	1,641	1.3	
Bangladesh Muslim League (Kader)	Salimullah	507	0.4	
Independent	Ahmed Mirza Khabir	379	0.3	
Majority		1,583	1.2	
Turnout		130,853	47.9	
BNP gain from JP(E)				
