= Husain Ahmad Madani =

Indian Islamic scholar and independence activist (1879–1957)

Shaykh al-Islam Husain Ahmad Madani
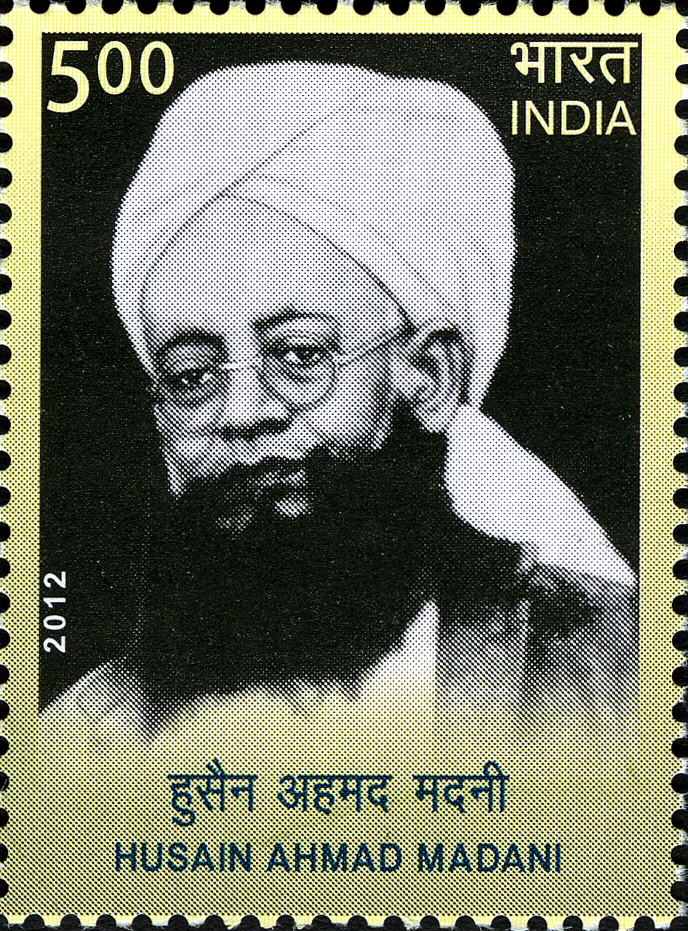

5th Principal and Sheikh al-Hadith of Darul Uloom Deoband
- In office 1927 – 5 December 1957
- Preceded by: Anwar Shah Kashmiri
- Succeeded by: Ibrahim Balyawi (As Principal); Syed Fakhruddin Ahmad (As Shaykh al-Hadīth)

4th President of Jamiat Ulama-e-Hind
- In office 1940 – 5 December 1957
- Preceded by: Kifayatullah Dehlawi
- Succeeded by: Ahmad Saeed Dehlavi

Personal details
- Relations: Ali ibn Abi Talib

Personal life
- Born: 6 October 1879 Bangarmau, North-Western Provinces, British India
- Died: 5 December 1957 (aged 78) Deoband, Uttar Pradesh, India
- Children: Asad Madani, Arshad Madani, Asjad Madani
- Parent: Sayyid Habibullah (father)
- Main interest(s): Hadith, Tafsir, Fiqh
- Notable idea: Composite nationalism
- Education: Darul Uloom Deoband

Religious life
- Religion: Islam
- Denomination: Sunni
- Jurisprudence: Hanafi
- Tariqa: Chishti (Sabiri-Imdadi); Naqshbandi; Qadri; Suhrawardy
- Creed: Maturidi
- Movement: Deobandi

Muslim leader
- Disciples: Nur Uddin Gohorpuri Shah Ahmad Shafi Shamsuddin Qasemi Ahmad Ali Badarpuri Muhammad Azhar Nomani
- Students: Abdul Matin Chowdhury Abdul Jalil Choudhury Abdul Ghani Azhari Muhammad Ismail Katki Sharif Hasan Deobandi Usman Ghani Qasmi Naseer Ahmad Khan Muhibbullah Babunagari Nik Abdul Aziz Nik Mat Zainul Abideen Azmi
- Influenced by: Mahmud Hasan Deobandi Rasheed Ahmed Gangohi
- Influenced: Nizamuddin Asir Adrawi Mohammad Ali Jauhar

Husain Ahmad Madani (Urdu: حسین احمد مدنی; 6 October 1879 – 5 December 1957) was an Indian Islamic scholar, serving as the principal of Darul Uloom Deoband in Uttar Pradesh. He was among the first recipients of the civilian honour of Padma Bhushan in 1954.

Madani played a key role in cementing the Congress-Khilafat Pact in the 1920s and "Through a series of lectures and pamphlets during the 1920s and 1930s, Madani prepared the ground for the cooperation of the Indian Ulama with the Indian National Congress."

His work Muttahida Qaumiyat Aur Islam was published in 1938 and advocated for a united country, in opposition to the partition of India.

== Early life and ancestry ==
Hussain Madani was born in Uttar Pradesh in a small town named Bangarmau in district Unnao. When he was born his father worked as a teacher in Bangarmau. His family was originally from Tanda in district Ambedkar Nagar. His father's name was Sayyid Habibullah, who was a descendant of the Islamic prophet Muhammad through Husayn ibn Ali down 35 generations. Husayn's 16th generation down descendant Sayyid Nurul Haq was given 24 villages in Tanda by the Emperor of Delhi. Eventually through time, some of this land was inherited by Sayyid Habibullah (thirteen villages as of 1757).

== Career ==
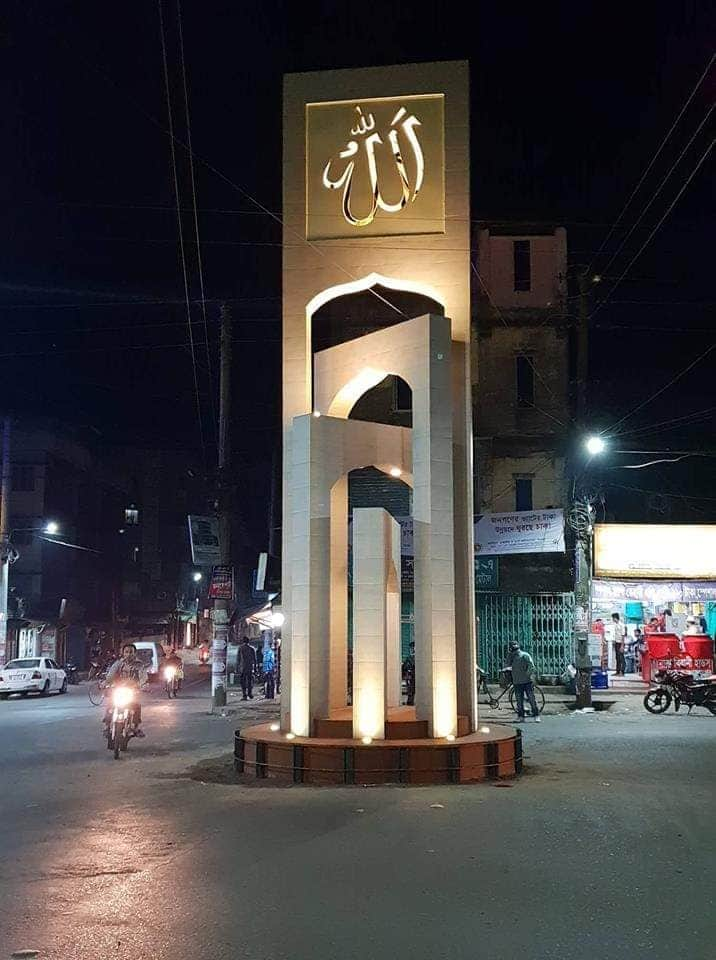
The Madani Square monument in Sylhet, Bangladesh, built in 2019 commemorating Hussain Madani.

After graduating from the Darul Uloom Deoband, he migrated to Medina with his family. He began teaching Arabic grammar, usul al-fiqh, usul al-hadith, and Quranic exegesis. He spent 18 years teaching these various Islamic sciences in Medina. He was then appointed as head teacher and "Shaikhul Hadith" of Darul Uloom Deoband. He served in this position for approximately 28 years.

== Efforts for independence ==
After his teacher Mehmud Hasan was sentenced by the British for his role in the Silk Letter Conspiracy to a prison in the Island of Malta, Madani volunteered to go with him so that he could look after him. He had personally not been convicted. Mehmud was imprisoned for three years. It so happened that Islamic month of Ramadan had come and neither Mehmud Hasan nor Madani was Hafiz of the Qur'an. At this instance, Mehmud Hasan said to his student (Madani) that most of his life, he didn't have a Ramadan without listening to the complete Qur'an in the special night prayers called Tarawih. Hussain Madani, who respected his teachers very much, took this very sentence of his teacher seriously and started to memorise the Quran while in prison. Daily, Madani would memorise one Juz (part) of the Quran and recite it in the Tarawih. Continuing to do so, he memorised the whole Quran in the 30 days of Ramadan, thus saving his teacher Mehmud Hasan from being deprived of listening to the Quran, as he had every Ramadan.

After his release, he returned to India and became actively involved in India's freedom struggle. He had considerable influence over a section of the Muslims, more prominently those belonging to Eastern Uttar Pradesh and Bihar. Maulana Madani was one of the founder members of Jamia Millia Islamia, New Delhi. He was the member of foundation committee (for the foundation of Jamia Millia Islamia) headed by Sheikhul-Hind Maulana Mahmood Hasan, met on 29 October 1929. He was against the two-nation theory, and predominantly due to this, a large number of Muslims from Eastern U.P. and Bihar declined to migrate to Pakistan at the time of 1947 independence of Pakistan and the Partition of India. He became the President of the Jamiat Ulema-e-Hind, a post he held until his death in 1957. (He also held the post of Shaikhul Hadith at Darul Uloom Deoband till his death.)

=== Debate between Iqbal and Madani ===
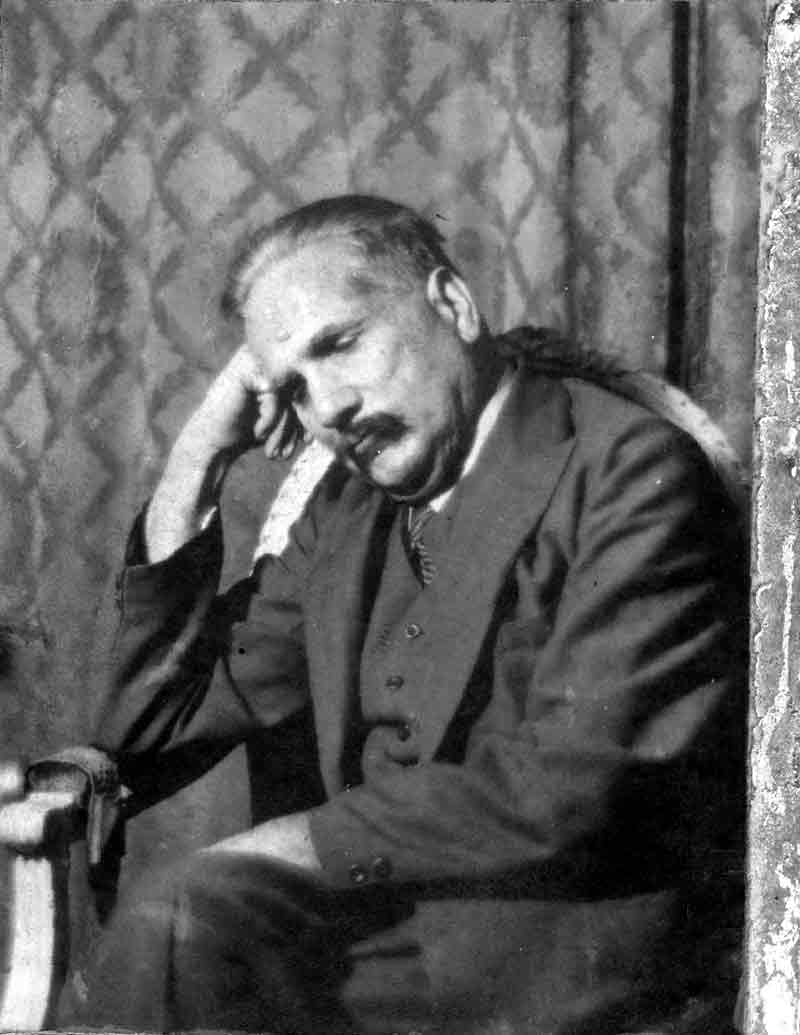
Allama Iqbal

Husain Ahmad Madani opposed the inception of Pakistan. He was of the view that in the present times, nations are formed on the basis of homeland (geographic basis) and not on ethnicity and religion. On the issue of whether the identity of a nation depended upon its land or religion, there was an interesting debate between Husain Ahmad Madani and Allama Iqbal. Allama Iqbal, a known pan-Islamist and a leading pro-Pakistan figure of the time, had at first developed differences of opinion with Husain Ahmad Madani over this issue. Later a mutual friend of both these leaders, a person named Taloot intervened by writing letters to both Iqbal and Madani. Taloot was able to bring more clarity to the circumstances and the intent of Madani in stating what he originally had stated about forming new nations and homelands. Taloot's intervention was successful and eventually both Iqbal and Madani were able to understand each other better. It resulted in a reconciliation between the two Muslim leaders and Iqbal finally wrote a personal letter saying that he respected Maulana Husain Ahmad Madani's service and devotion to Islam as much as any other Muslim despite their political differences. Husain Ahmad Madani himself was reportedly quoted as saying, "All should endeavor jointly for such a democratic government in which Hindus, Muslims, Sikhs, Christians and Parsis are included. Such a freedom is in accordance with Islam." ... ."that Muslims could live as observant Muslims in a religiously plural society where they would be full citizens of an independent, secular India."

== Sylhet ==
After being released in 1923, employment became necessary for him. Despite previously serving at the Calcutta Alia Madrasa, his long imprisonment affected his relations with the staff there. He also had no accommodation. He was offered jobs from various places and at the same time was given a condition to refrain from politics. The Bengal Legislative Council offered him 40,000 takas in advance and a monthly salary of 500 takas to teach at the University of Dacca. A similar offer was made by the Government of Egypt which offered a monthly wage of 1000 takas for the post of Shaykhul Hadith at Al-Azhar University. Madani rejected both of these offers. Qazi Zahurul Islam noticed Madani's poverty and contacted the Nizam of Hyderabad, requesting to add him to the stipend list for scholars and poets. However, Madani rejected this too as he saw it to be shameful.

Madani's followers in Sylhet offered him to come to Sylhet and improve the quality of the Islamic education system there. This was due to Sylhet being incorporated into the Assam Province, requiring Islamic students to go to Dhaka or Calcutta for appropriate learning such as Sihah-e-Sittah. Thus, he came to Sylhet for 2 years due to the insistence of the people of Sylhet, despite offers of teaching from other places. In December 1924, Madani entered Sylhet and started teaching at the Khelafat Building Madrasa near Nayasarak Masjid in Manik Pirer Tila, Sylhet. In the daily five-hour class, Madani would teach books such as Sharh Nukhbatil Fikar, Al-Fawz al-Kabir, Jami Tirmidhi and other Sihah-e-Sittah. He also immersed himself in tasawwuf in Sylhet. Three years later, he returned to Sylhet and committed to his followers that he would visit Sylhet every Ramadan. Madani continued this annual practice up until the Partition of India in 1947.

== Literary works ==
- Composite Nationalism and Islam
- Naqsh-e-Hayat (Autobiography of Maulana Madni).
- Ash-Shihabus Saqib (Refutation of Ahmed Raza Khan Barelvi)
- Maktubat Shaykh al-Islam (over 2000 pages)
- Safar Nama Shaykhul Hind Mahmud al-Hasan (related to Silk Letter Movement)
- Tasawwur-e-Shaikh (related to Tasawwuf)

== Awards and recognition ==
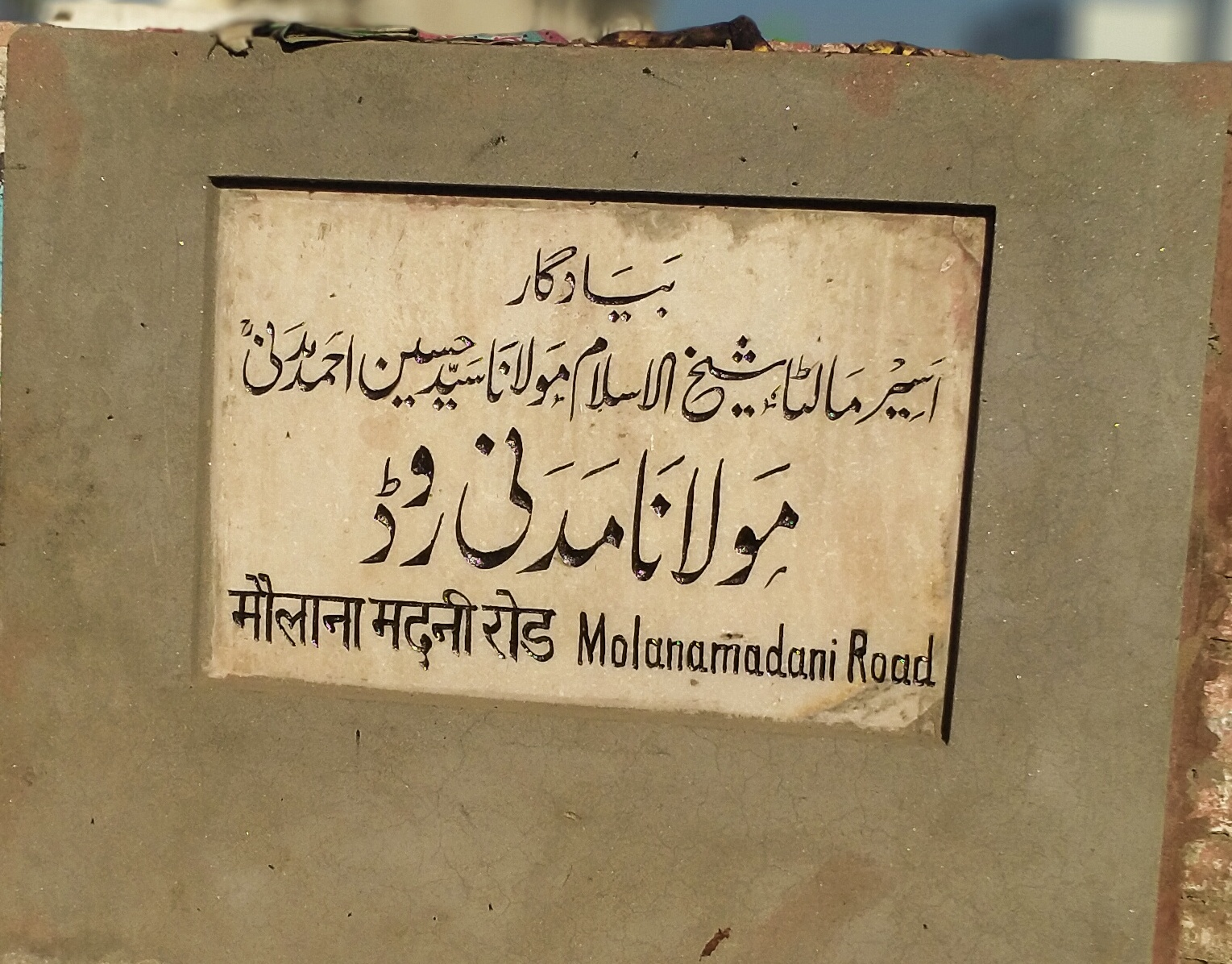
Maulana Madani road in Deoband is named after Madani

- Padma Bhushan Award by the Government of India in 1954
- India Post issued a commemorative postage stamp in his honour in 2012
- Madani Square, structure named after his efforts and hard work in Sylhet, Bangladesh.

== Death and legacy ==
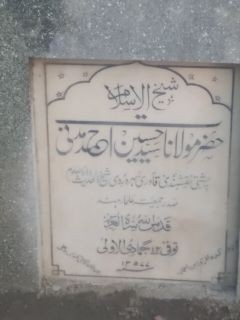
The inscription on the grave of Hussain Ahmad Madani

Madni died on 5 December 1957. His funeral prayer was led by Zakariyya Kandhlawi. Urdu author Nizamuddin Asir Adrawi has written his biography, Ma'asr Shaykh al-Islam, which is published by Darul Mu'allifeen, Deoband.

== Bibliography ==
- Metcalf, Barbara (2012), Husain Ahmad Madani: The Jihad for Islam and India's Freedom, Oneworld Publications, ISBN 978-1-78074-210-6
- Moj, Muhammad (2015), The Deoband Madrassah Movement: Countercultural Trends and Tendencies, Anthem Press, ISBN 978-1-78308-389-3
- Wahidi, Faridul (1992). Shaikhulislam Maulana Husain Ahmad Madni: Ek Savani va Tarikhi Mutalaah. New Delhi: Qaumi Kitab Ghar. LCCN 92903430. OCLC 29236286.
- Adrawi, Nizamuddin Asir; Nadvi, Asjad Qasemi (2017). শায়খুল হিন্দ মাওলানা মাহমুদ হাসান দেওবন্দি রহ. জীবন ও কর্ম. Translated by Siddiq, Abul Kalam. Deoband; Dhaka: Shaykhul Hind Academy; Maktabatul Hera. p. 73. OCLC 47168064.
- Ahmad, Dr. Mushtaq (2000). শায়খুল ইসলাম হযরত মাওলানা হুসাইন আহমদ মাদানি রহ (PDF). Dhaka, Bangladesh: Islamic Foundation Bangladesh. Archived from the original (PDF) on 28 July 2019.
- Islahi, Najmuddin (1952). Maktubat-i Shaikhulislam (in Urdu). Gujranwala: Madani Library. OCLC 20069582.
