= Muradnagar Upazila =

Upazila in Chattogram Division, Bangladesh

Muradnagar মুরাদনগর
- Upazila
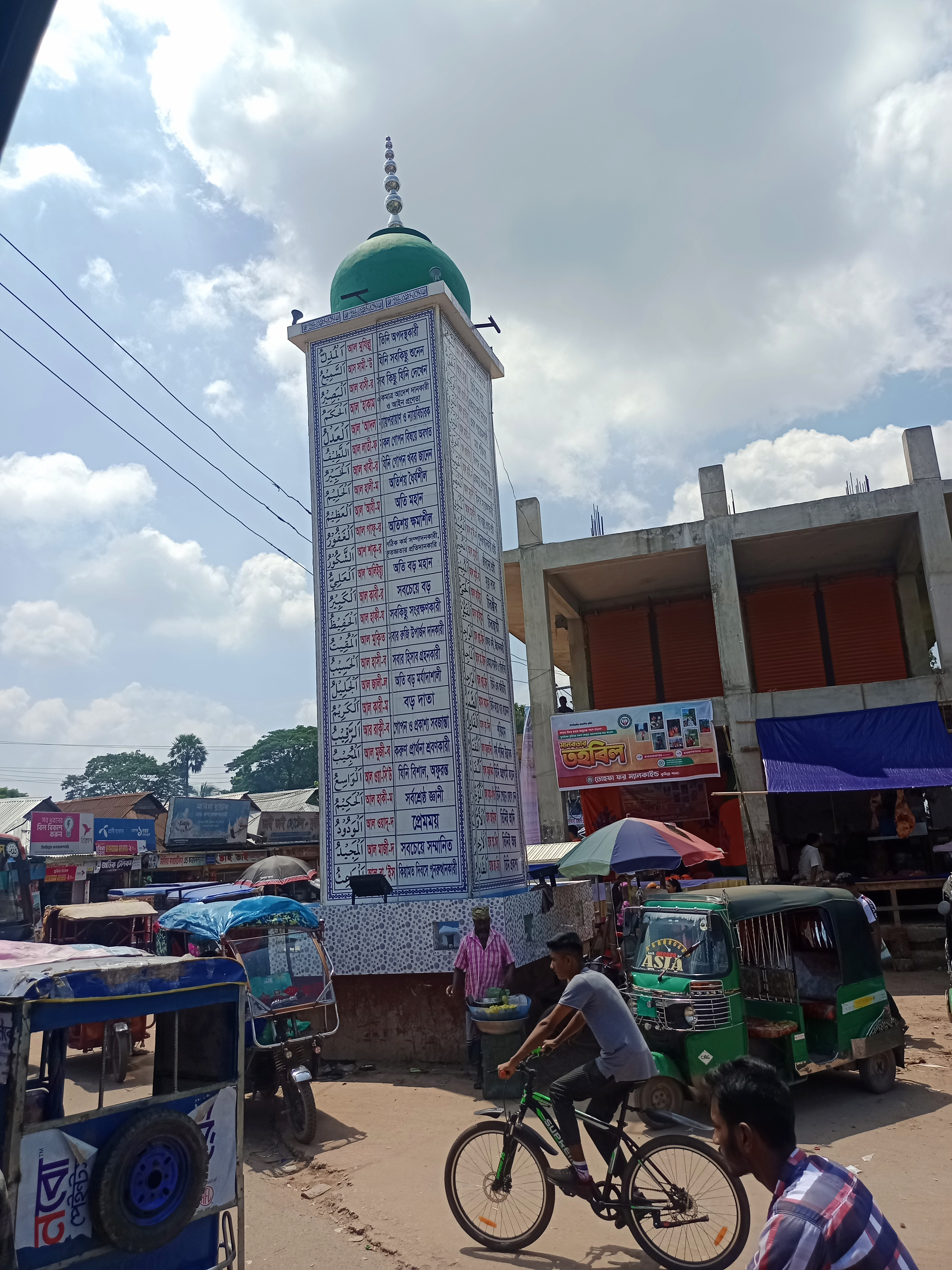
- A pillar displaying the 99 names of Allah in Muradnagar

- Coordinates: 23°38.3′N 90°56′E
- Country: Bangladesh
- Division: Chittagong
- District: Comilla

Government
  - Upazila Chairman: Ahsanul Alam Sarkar

Area
  - Total: 340.73 km^{2} (131.56 sq mi)

Population (2022)
  - Total: 582,950
  - Density: 1,710.9/km^{2} (4,431.2/sq mi)
- Time zone: UTC+6 (BST)
- Postal code: 3540
- Area code: 08026
- Website: muradnagar.comilla.gov.bd

Muradnagar Upazila mauza geocode map

Muradnagar (Bengali: মুরাদনগর) is an upazila of Comilla District in Chattogram Division, Bangladesh. It is the only upazila in Bangladesh with three gas fields.

== History ==
In ancient times, the area was a part of the geopolitical region of Samatata ruled by the Rata dynasty. In the late 20th century, an irrigation canal was being dug in Urishwar, Paharpur Union. During the process, three copper plate inscriptions were discovered, surrounded by old potsherds, supposedly belonging to the Rata dynasty of Samatata.

Muradnagar was previously known as Tholla. During the Mughal period, the area was under the Balda Khal pargana. After the arrival of the East India Company, a number of rebellions and peasant movements took place in Tholla. The 19th-century zamindar Mir Ashraf Ali Shirazi had a house in Tholla. In 1858, Tholla was established as a thana and in 1878, Tholla was renamed to Muradnagar. It was named after the revenue collector Mir Murad Ali.

Khwaja Salimullah, the Nawab of Dhaka donated towards the Muradnagar High School in 1903. In 1941, Captain Narendranath Dutta founded the Sreekail College, an institution of nationwide importance.

Many Muradnagari pro-independence fighters were killed during the Bangladesh War of Independence in 1971 during clashes with the Pakistan Army. The thana was upgraded to an upazila in 1983.

== Geography ==
Muradnagar, located on the bank of the Gumti River at 23.6385°N 90.9325°E, is about 35.42 kilometres by road from Cumilla district headquarters. It is the largest upazila in Cumilla District by total area of 340.73 km^{2}.

It is bounded by Nabinagar Upazila of Brahmanbaria District on the north, Chandina Upazila on the south, Debidwar Upazila and Brahmanpara Upazila on the east, Kasba Upazila of Brahmanbaria District on the northeast, Daudkandi Upazila on the southwest, Titas Upazila and Homna Upazila on the west, and Bancharampur Upazila of Brahmanbaria District on the northwest.

=== Rivers ===
The main rivers flowing through this upazila are Gumti, Buri, Old Titas, Arsi-Nalia, Archi and numerous smaller rivers including Kaladumur, Khirai. Major canals include Ader, Curzon, Maricha. Major lakes (Bengali: বিল) include Dalpa-Makimpur Beel, Siddheshwari Beel.

== Administration ==
Muradnagar Upazila is divided into 22 union councils. The union councils are subdivided into 153 mauzas and 301 villages. The administrative activities of these unions are divided between two police stations (thanas): Muradnagar Thana and Bangora Bazar Thana.

10 union councils under Bangora Bazar Thana

- 1 No. Sreekail
- 2 No. Akubpur
- 3 No. Andikut
- 4 No. Purbadhair East
- 5 No. Purbadhair West
- 6 No. Bangora East
- 7 No. Bangora Wast
- 8 No. Chapitala
- 12 No. Ramchandrapur North
- 22 No. Tanki

12 union councils under Muradnagar Thana

- 9 No. Kamalla
- 10 No. Jatrapur
- 11 No. Ramchandrapur South
- 13 No. Muradnagar Sadar
- 14 No. Nabipur East
- 15 No. Nabipur West
- 16 No. Dhamghar
- 17 No. Jahapur
- 18 No. Chhaliakandi
- 19 No. Darora
- 20 No. Paharpur
- 21 No. Babutipara

== Demographics ==
Religions in Muradnagar Upazila (2022)
Religion	Percent
Islam	93.78%
Hinduism	6.21%
Other or not stated	0.01%

According to the 2022 Bangladeshi census, Muradnagar Upazila had 131,575 households and a population of 582,950. 11.16% of the population were under 5 years of age. Muradnagar had a literacy rate (age 7 and over) of 72.36%: 73.20% for males and 71.65% for females, and a sex ratio of 87.10 males for every 100 females. 74,672 (12.81%) lived in urban areas.

According to the 2011 Census of Bangladesh, Muradnagar Upazila had 101,809 households and a population of 523,556. 144,345 (27.57%) were under 10 years of age. Muradnagar has a literacy rate (age 7 and over) of 48.81%, compared to the national average of 51.8%, and a sex ratio of 1115 females per 1000 males. 32,644 (6.24%) lived in urban areas.

=== List of chairmen ===
List of chairmen
Name	Term
Jahangir Alam Sarkar	1985 - 1986
Pirzada Zahirul Alam Chishti	1986 - 1991
Harun Al-Rashid	2009 - 2014
Ahsanul Alam Sarkar	Present

== Notable people ==
- Romizuddin Ahmed, footballer and MP, was born in Babutipara in 1910.
- Kamini Kumar Dutta, lawyer and politician, was born in Sreekail in 1878.
- Narendra Nath Dutta, Indian physician and industrialist, was born in Sreekail in 1884.
- Yussuf Abdullah Harun, MP, is from Bhubanghar.
- Kazi Shah Mofazzal Hossain Kaikobad, MP, represented Comilla-3 (Muradnagar).
- Asif Mahmud, student leader in the July uprising and advisor in the Yunus ministry, is from Akubpur.
- Rafiqul Islam Miah, MP, represented Comilla-3.
- M.A Mannan, Chairman, Muradnagar Upazila.
- Arvin Abdullah, Young Activist Represented Camilla In International Stage.

== See also ==
- Adhyapak Abdul Majid College
- Paiyapathar
