= Abul Kalam Azad (Comilla politician) =

Bangladeshi politician

- আবুল কালাম আজাদ

Member of the Bangladesh Parliament for Comilla-4
- In office 30 January 2024 – 6 August 2024
- Preceded by: Razee Mohammad Fakhrul
- Succeeded by: Hasnat Abdullah

Personal details
- Born: 31 October 1984 (age 41)

Abul Kalam Azad (born 31 October 1984) is a Bangladeshi politician. He is a former Jatiya Sangsad member representing the Comilla-4 constituency.

== Career ==
Azad was nominated as a member of parliament as a candidate of Independent from Comilla-4 constituency in 2024 Bangladeshi general election.

Azad is the chairman of Dhaka Group.
