= Shapla Square =

Sculpture in Dhaka

Coordinates: 23°43.59′N 90°25.30′E

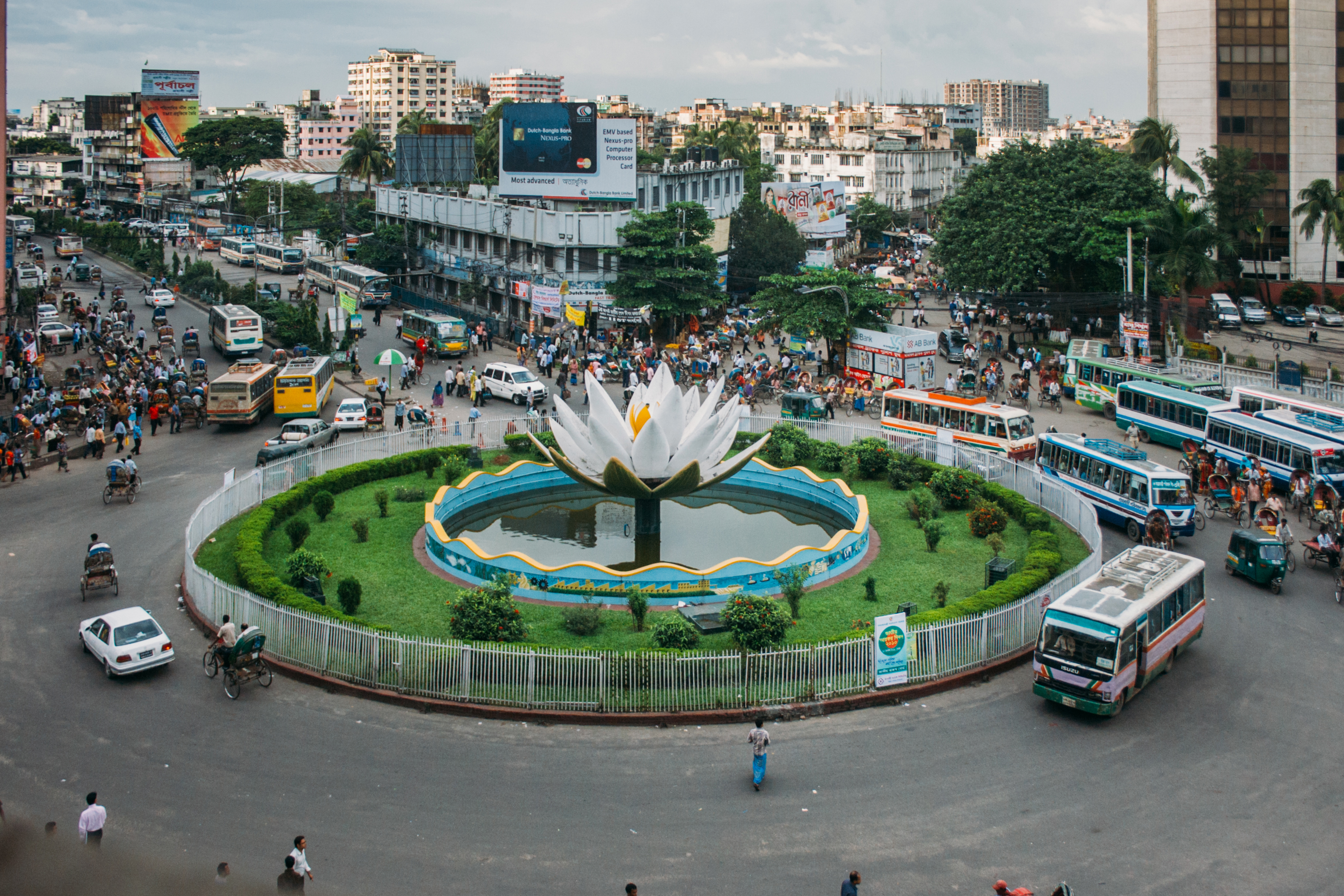
Shapla Square in Dhaka

Shapla Square (Bengali: শাপলা চত্বর, Shapla Chottor) is an iconic landmark and sculpture at the heart of Motijheel, a central business district, near the center of Dhaka, the capital of Bangladesh. It depicts a Shapla or water lily (Nymphaea nouchali), the national flower of Bangladesh. It is located in the center of a circular fountain on a roundabout adjacent to the Bangladesh Bank.

The location also marks a mass grave of the Bangladesh Liberation War of 1971. It was a popular spot during the 90s in Dhaka city.

== See also ==
- Allah Chattar, Muradnagar, Comilla
- Madani Square, Sylhet
