= Paiyapathar =

Coordinates: 23.6368°N 90.9724°E

Paiyapathar or Paia Pathar (Bengali: পৈয়াপাথর, পইয়াপাথর) is a village in Paschim Nabipur Union, Muradnagar Upazila, Comilla District, Bangladesh. It is 114 kilometres (71 mi) from Dhaka.

The name Paiyapathar is a compound of two Bengali words: paiya (meaning touched) and pathor(meaning stones), to thus mean "touched stones". According to the 2011 Bangladesh census, Paiyapathar had 540 households and a population of 2,740.

== See also ==
- List of villages in Bangladesh
