= Bangrabazar Thana =

Thana in Comilla, Bangladesh

Bangrabazar বাঙ্গরাবাজার থানা
- Thana
- Bangrabazar Thana
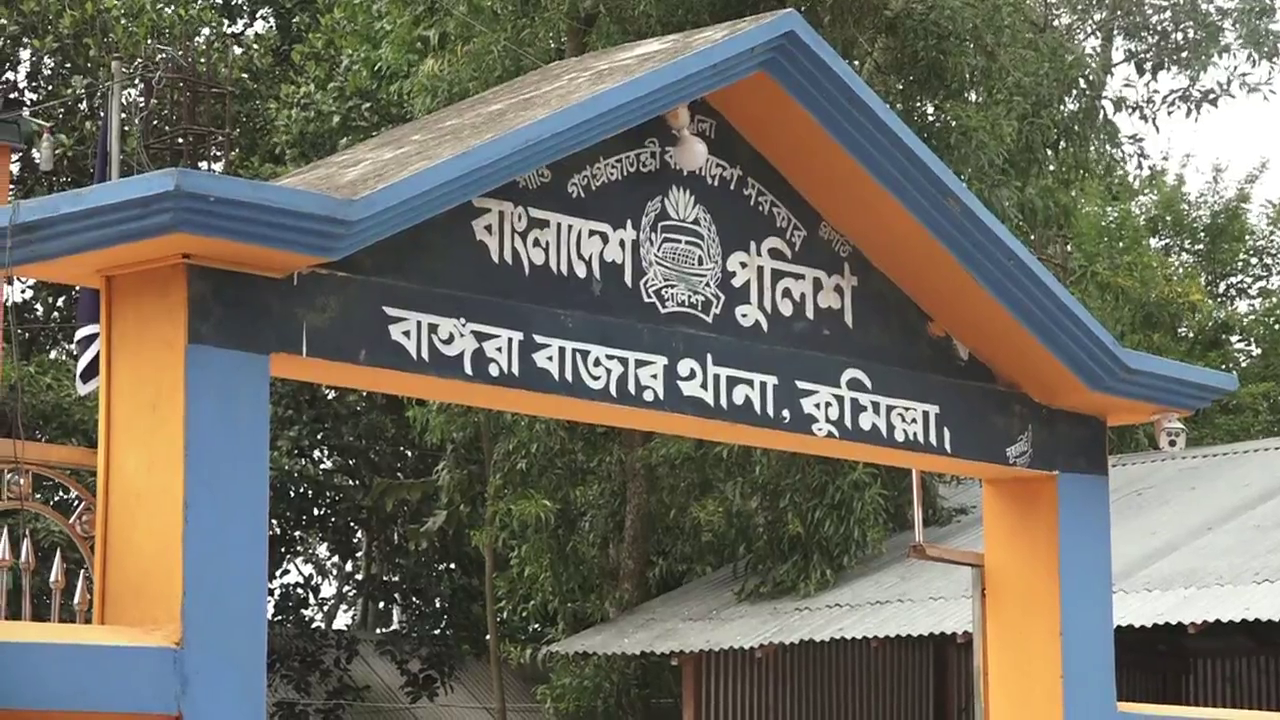

- Location within Bangladesh
- Coordinates: 23°43′N 90°59′E
- Country: Bangladesh
- Division: Chittagong
- District: Comilla
- Upazila: Bangora
- Establishment: 14 September 2015

Area
  - Total: 189 km^{2} (73 sq mi)
- Postal code: 3543
- Area code: 08026
- Website: bangarabazarthana.muradnagar.comilla.gov.bd

Bangrabazar is a thana of Bangora Upazila, Comilla District, Bangladesh.

== History ==
The plan to set up a police station in Bangrabazar was confirmed in 2015, two years after Prime Minister Sheikh Hasina's announcement. One year after the confirmation, the operational activities of Bangora Bazar police station started on 1 January.

== Administrative areas ==
Administrative activities of 10 unions of Bangora upazila are under Bangrabazar police station.

Unions:

- No. 1 Srikail
- No. 2 Akubpur
- No. 3 Andikot No. 3
- No. 4 Purbadhair East
- No. 5 Purbadhair West
- No. 6 Bangra East
- No. 7 Bangra West
- No. 8 Chapitala
- No. 12 Ramchandrapur North
- No. 22 Tonki
