= Rafiqul Islam Miah =

Bangladeshi barrister and politician

- রফিকুল ইসলাম মিয়া
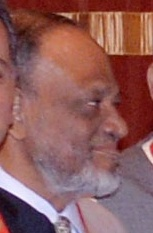
- Mia in 2016

Minister of Housing and Public Works
- In office 19 September 1991 – 19 March 1996
- Preceded by: Wahiduddin Ahmed
- Succeeded by: Mirza Abbas

Member of the Bangladesh Parliament for Comilla-3
- In office 5 April 1991 – 24 November 1995
- Preceded by: Kazi Shah Mofazzal Hossain Kaikobad
- Succeeded by: Kazi Shah Mofazzal Hossain Kaikobad

Personal details
- Party: Bangladesh Nationalist Party
- Spouse: Shaheed Rafiq

Rafiqul Islam Miah is a Bangladeshi barrister and politician. He served as the State Minister for Labour and Manpower and later as Minister of Housing and Public Works in the first Khaleda Zia cabinet during 1991–1996. He also served as Minister of Education in the government formed after the February 1996 Bangladeshi general election.

== Career ==
In September 2007, Miah served as the lawyer of Begum Khaleda Zia when she was arrested on charges of corruption and misuse of power. In 2008 Rafiqul represented the Bihari community in Bangladesh as they were granted citizenship status by High Court of Bangladesh. He is currently a member of the National Standing Committee of the Bangladesh Nationalist Party.

=== Conviction ===
In 2001, Anti-Corruption Commission of Bangladesh sent Miah a notice to submit his wealth statement. Failure to comply with that notice, in January 2004, led a case filed against him. On 19 November 2018, he was sentenced to three years in prison and was arrested from his Eskaton home the same day. On 26 November, he secured a six-month bail from the High Court which also stayed the fines.
