= Jahangir Alam Sarkar =

Awami League politician

Member of the Bangladesh Parliament for Comilla-3
- In office 30 January 2024 – 6 August 2024
- Preceded by: Yussuf Abdullah Harun

Personal details
- Born: 1 January 1948 (age 78)
- Party: Bangladesh Awami League
- Occupation: Politician

Jahangir Alam Sarkar (born 1 January 1948) is an Awami League politician and a former Jatiya Sangsad member representing the Comilla-3 constituency. He is former general secretary of Comilla North District Awami League. Sarkar, being an independent candidate contested under Eagle-symbol, secured victory with 83,981 votes.
