= Hasnat Abdullah =

Bangladeshi politician and activist

- হাসনাত আব্দুল্লাহ
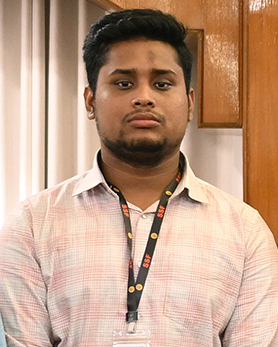
- Abdullah in 2025

Member of Parliament
- Incumbent
- Assumed office 17 February 2026
- Preceded by: Abul Kalam Azad
- Constituency: Comilla-4

Chief Organizer (Southern Region) of National Citizen Party
- Incumbent
- Assumed office 28 February 2025
- Convener: Nahid Islam
- Preceded by: Position established

Personal details
- Born: Md. Abul Hasnat; 13 September 1998 (age 28) Debidwar, Comilla, Bangladesh
- Party: National Citizen Party
- Children: 1
- Education: University of Dhaka
- Occupation: Student activist; Teacher
- Known for: Coordinator of the Students Against Discrimination
- Movements: July Uprising: 2024 Bangladesh quota reform movement; Non-cooperation movement (2024)

Md. Abul Hasnat, better known as Hasnat Abdullah (Bengali: হাসনাত আব্দুল্লাহ) is a Bangladeshi politician, educator, activist, and former convener of the Students Against Discrimination, which led the July Uprising in 2024. He has been the Chief Organizer (Southern Region) of the National Citizen Party since 2025. He is a member of the Parliament of 13th Jatiya Sangsad from Comilla-4 constituency.

== Early life and education ==
Abdullah was born on 28 February 1998, Debidwar, Comilla. He is a graduate of the English department at the University of Dhaka.

== Activism ==
Abdullah was one of the coordinators of the Students Against Discrimination, which led the initial quota reform movement opposing quotas in government jobs and evolved into broader anti-government movement opposing the Hasina government. He, along with Nahid Islam, Asif Mahmud, Sarjis Alam and others gained national recognition in mid-July 2024 when police detained him and several other University of Dhaka students as the protests became violent.

In the aftermath, On 5 August, Prime Minister Sheikh Hasina fled the country after resignation. Following the exile of Hasina, Nahid Islam stated that their goals weren't fully met and that the movement aimed to "abolish fascist systems forever".

He and his organisation called on Nobel Laureate Muhammad Yunus to lead Interim government.

On 24 December 2024, AFP reported allegations that Abdullah was involved in the dismissal of five Somoy TV staff. City Group chair Mohammad Hasan told BBC Bangla that a 15-member team—including Abdullah—had visited and pressed for specific sackings, a claim Abdullah denies. He later described the AFP story as "false propaganda."

Abdullah attracted attention after National Citizen Party included Muntasir Rahman, an openly gay activist, in its central committee. Though the party gave no official comment, Abdullah indirectly called the inclusion an "unintentional mistake." Following objections from Abdullah and Sarjis Alam, Rahman was excluded from the 217-member convening committee.

== Political career ==
Following the July Uprising in 2024, the National Citizen Party (NCP) was officially launched on 28 February 2025, with Hasnat Abdullah as its Chief Organizer (Southern Region).

On 10 May 2025, Hasnat Abdullah called for a protest to permanently ban the Awami League.

In March 2025, Abdullah's public remarks alleging military interference in political affairs sparked controversy. Bangladesh Army Headquarters termed his comments "ridiculous and immature."

Between March and April 2025, the National Citizen Party (NCP) experienced internal rifts after Abdullah and fellow coordinator Sarjis Alam issued conflicting statements about a meeting with the military. Army HQ dismissed the claims as "immature," while senior NCP members criticized Abdullah's "unvetted social-media behavior." On 15 April 2025, Abdullah warned critics, "You won't be able to handle it if I start breaching decorum." The NCP later established a "Discipline and Investigation Committee" to regulate social-media conduct of party officeholders.

In April 2025, Abdullah was reportedly involved in a heated altercation during a regional Awami League meeting in Barisal, concerning the nomination of candidates for upcoming municipal elections. Local reports indicated that Abdullah and senior leaders exchanged sharp words in front of media representatives, reflecting deepening divisions within the party's southern committee.

During the 2026 Bangladesh elections, historically Hasnat won all the polling stations in the Comilla-4, Debidwar constituency in the 13th National Parliament. He secured a decisive victory by obtaining 166,583 votes, while his nearest rival, Md A Jasim Uddin of the Gono Odhikar Parishad, received 49,885 votes.

== Personal life ==
Abdullah got married on 12 October 2024.On 16 October 2025, he and his wife became parents to a newborn son, Hammad Abdullah Hamza, at a private hospital in Dhaka.
