= Chapitala Union =

Union in Chittagong Division, Bangladesh

Chapitala চাপিতলা
- Upazila
- Location in Bangladesh
- Coordinates: 23°38.3′N 90°56′E
- Country: Bangladesh
- Division: Chittagong Division
- District: Comilla District
- Upazila: Bangra Upazila

Area
  - Total: 15 km^{2} (5.8 sq mi)

Population (2017)
  - Total: 23,100
  - Density: 1,800/km^{2} (4,700/sq mi)
- Time zone: UTC+6 (BST)
- Postal code: 3543
- Website: chapitalaup.comilla.gov.bd

Chapitala (Bengali: চাপিতলা) is a Union Parishad of Bangra Upazila, Comilla District, Bangladesh.

== Administration ==
Chapitala Union Parishad is one of the oldest union parishad in Bangra Upazila. This union parishad has 9 wards and 4 villages. The name of villages are

1. Chapitala has number 5, 6, 7, 8, 9 wards (Total 5 wards).
2. Khapura has number 3 wards (Total 1 ward)
3. Pushkonirpar has number 4 wards (Total 1 ward)
4. Ulomoira has number 1 & 2 wards (Total 2 wards)

=== Political system ===
Chapitala Union Parishad has Nine members from all nine wards. They're main leader is Union Parishad Chairman. Every 5 years later people selected they're leadership. Currently Chapitala Union Parishad chairman name is Manik mia people called him Manik Chairman.

Chairman name : কাইয়ুম ভূঁইয়া

- 1 no wards member name :
- 2 no wards member name :
- 3 no wards member name :
- 4 no wards member name :
- 5 no wards member name : Abdul Kuddus Mia
- 6 no wards member name : বখতিয়ার ইসলাম
- 7 no wards member name : মোতালেব
- 8 no wards member name :
- 9 no wards member name :

== Education ==
Chapitala Union Parishad has

- Six Primary school
- Four private children school
- One high school (Wazifa Khatun High School)
- One College (Farid Uddin Degree College)
- 16 Morning Madrasa
