= Debidwar Upazila =

Upazila in Comilla District, Bangladesh

Debidwar দেবিদ্বার
- Upazila
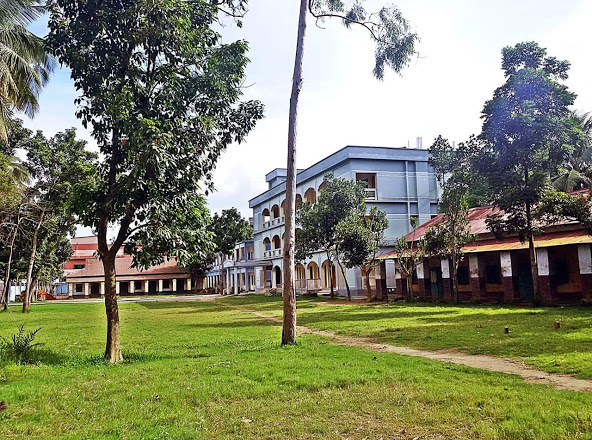
- Debidwar Government Reaz Uddin Pilot Model High School

- Coordinates: 23°36′N 90°59.5′E
- Country: Bangladesh
- Division: Chittagong
- District: Comilla

Government
  - MP: Hasnat Abdullah
  - Upazila Chairman: Vacant

Area
  - Total: 238.36 km^{2} (92.03 sq mi)

Population (2022)
  - Total: 471,927
  - Density: 1,979.9/km^{2} (5,127.9/sq mi)
- Time zone: UTC+6 (BST)
- Postal code: 3530
- Area code: 08024
- Website: debidwar.comilla.gov.bd

Debidwar Upazila mauza geocode map

Debidwar (Bengali: দেবিদ্বার) is an upazila of Comilla District in the Division of Chittagong, Bangladesh.

== Geography ==
Debidwar is located at 23.6°N 90.9917°E. It has a total area of 238.36 km^{2}.

== Demographics ==
According to the 2022 Bangladeshi census, Debidwar Upazila had 106,652 households and a population of 471,927. 11.43% of the population were under 5 years of age. Debidwar had a literacy rate (age 7 and over) of 76.56%: 78.29% for males and 75.12% for females, and a sex ratio of 86.35 males for every 100 females. 102,685 (21.76%) lived in urban areas.

According to the 2011 Census of Bangladesh, Debidwar Upazila had 82,695 households and a population of 431,352. 118,968 (27.58%) were under 10 years of age. Debidwar has a literacy rate (age 7 and over) of 52.83%, compared to the national average of 51.8%, and a sex ratio of 1112 females per 1000 males. 61,418 (14.24%) lived in urban areas.

Religions in Debidwar Upazila (2022)
Religion	Percent
Islam	95.35%
Hinduism	4.64%
Other or not stated	0.01%

== Administration ==
Debidwar Upazila is divided into Debidwar Municipality and 15 union parishads: Barkamta, Boroshalghor, Dakshin Gunaighor, Dhamti, Elahabad, Fatehabad, Jafargonj, Mohanpur, Rajameher, Rasulpur, Subil, Sultanpur, Uttar Gunaighor, Vani, and Yousufpur. The union parishads are subdivided into 129 mauzas and 192 villages.

Debidwar Municipality is subdivided into 9 wards and 22 mahallas.

== Education ==
- Gongamondal Raj Institution

== See also ==
- Upazilas of Bangladesh
- Districts of Bangladesh
- Divisions of Bangladesh
