= Abdul Lateef Pur Qazvi =

Indian Hadith scholar (d. 1954)

Hafiz, Maulana Abdul Lateef Pur Qazvi

Deputy Chancellor (Nazim) of Mazahir Uloom
- In office 1344 AH – 1346 AH
- Preceded by: Khalil Ahmad Saharanpuri

Chancellor (Nazim) of Mazahir Uloom
- In office 1346 AH – 1373 AH
- Succeeded by: Asadullah Rampuri

Personal life
- Born: Syed Abdul Lateef c. 1879 or 1881 Pur Qazi, Muzaffarnagar district, British India
- Died: 2 August 1954 (c. 75 years old) Saharanpur, Uttar Pradesh, India
- Education: Mazahir Uloom
- Occupation: Islamic scholar, hadith teacher

Religious life
- Religion: Islam
- Denomination: Sunni Islam
- Order: Chishti–Imdadi–Khalili
- Jurisprudence: Hanafi
- Movement: Deobandi

Muslim leader
- Teacher: Khalil Ahmad Saharanpuri; Inayat Ilahi Saharanpuri
- Disciple of: Zakariyya Kandhlavi

Abdul Lateef Pur Qazvi (died 1954) was an Indian Islamic scholar and teacher associated with Mazahir Uloom in Saharanpur, British India. He served as the madrasa's nazim (chancellor) from 1344 AH until his death and taught several hadith collections, including Sahih al-Bukhari and Jami' al-Tirmidhi. He also wrote a treatise on the Dars-i-Nizami curriculum and participated in the Bahawalpur Ahmadiyya case.

== Early life and education ==
Abdul Lateef Pur Qazvi was born in Pur Qazi, Muzaffarnagar district, Uttar Pradesh, India. Sources differ regarding his year of birth. Akbar Shah Bukhari gives it as 1298 AH, while Nizamuddin Asir Adrawi records it as 1299 AH (1881 CE). Ashiq Ilahi Bulandshahri expressed uncertainty about his birth year, and Shahid Saharanpuri did not specify it in Tareekh-e-Mazahir, volume 2. The website of Mazahir Uloom Waqf gives his birth year as 1879 CE.

His father, Jamiat Ali (d. 12 Rabi II 1341 AH), was an Islamic scholar who served as the Head of the Department of Arabic and Persian at Government Sadiq Egerton College Bahawalpur.

He memorized the Quran under a hafiz named Amanat Ali from Baghra at Madrasa Talimul Islam in his native village. He studied the elementary Persian texts under his father in Bahawalpur. Later, during a visit to Bahawalpur by Khalil Ahmad Saharanpuri, his father requested him to take Pur Qazvi along with him. Accordingly, in 1315 AH, Saharanpuri brought him to Mazahir Uloom in Saharanpur and enrolled him there. He completed the Dars-i-Nizami curriculum in 1322 AH, securing the highest marks in the Daura-e-Hadith (final year) examinations with distinction.

At the madrasa in Saharanpur, he studied Sahih al-Bukhari, Sahih Muslim, Sunan Abi Dawud, Jami' al-Tirmidhi and Sunan Ibn Majah under Khalil Ahmad Saharanpuri, and Sunan al-Nasa'i under Inayat Ilahi Saharanpuri.

== Career ==
After completing his studies, Pur Qazvi began his teaching career at Mazahir Uloom in Saharanpur on 1 Jumada I 1323 AH, at the recommendation of Abdur Rahim Raipuri, with a monthly salary of 10 rupees. His salary eventually rose to 61 rupees. He was known within the premises of Mazahir Uloom simply as "Hafiz Sahib". He was also the son-in-law of Khalil Ahmad Saharanpuri.

Pur Qazvi performed the Hajj pilgrimage in 1323 AH alongside Khalil Ahmad Saharanpuri and again in 1328 AH as part of the group accompanying Abdur Rahim Raipuri. In 1333 AH, when Saharanpuri went for Hajj, Pur Qazvi served as deputy head (na'ib muhtamim) of Mazahir Uloom for a few months.

In 1339 AH, he was appointed a teacher of Hadith. When Saharanpuri migrated to the Hijaz in 1344 AH, some of his lessons were assigned to Pur Qazvi. Pur Qazvi also served as the head teacher (sadar mudarris) of Mazahir Uloom from 1340 to 1344 AH. Pur Qazvi served as acting nazim of Mazahir Uloom from 1344 to 1346 AH, and as nazim from 1346 AH until his death in 1373 AH.

In 1346 AH, when Zakariyya Kandhlavi was appointed Shaykh al-Hadith, Pur Qazvi's teaching responsibilities included Sahih al-Bukhari. Ashiq Ilahi Bulandshahri writes that Pur Qazvi initially continued teaching its first volume for three months before proceeding to the second volume, while Kandhlavi taught the first volume from the point at which Pur Qazvi had left off. This arrangement continued until Pur Qazvi's death in 1373 AH. Pur Qazvi was also assigned to teach Jami' al-Tirmidhi in 1346 AH and again in 1366 AH, as well as Sharh Ma'ani al-Athar in 1354 AH.

Before his second journey to Rangoon, Pur Qazvi was told that people there might approach him for bay'ah. He replied that he had not received authorization from a spiritual guide. Zakariyya Kandhlavi, who was his student, then granted him permission to accept bay'ah, remarking that granting permission to his own teacher would otherwise be disrespectful. Pur Qazvi accepted the permission and, through him, the Chishti-Imdadi-Khalili spiritual lineage continued in Rangoon.

His students included Zafar Ahmad Usmani, Idris Kandhlavi, Badre Alam Merathi, Abdur Rahman Kamilpuri, Jameel Ahmad Thanvi, Asadullah Rampuri, Zakariyya Kandhlavi, Yusuf Kandhlavi, Ihtishamul Hasan Kandhlavi, and Akbar Ali Saharanpuri.

Pur Qazvi participated in the Bahawalpur Ahmadiyya case alongside Asadullah Rampuri, where they presented arguments based on the Qur'an and Hadith. The case was instituted in 1926 and concluded in 1935.

== Literary works ==
Pur Qazvi wrote a treatise titled Tarjih-e-Dars-e-Nizami, in which he discussed the merits of the Dars-i-Nizami curriculum and the reasons for preferring it in response to proposals for its revision and reform. The twelve-page treatise, dated 1355 AH, is preserved as an unpublished pamphlet in the rare collection of Mazahir Uloom under catalogue number 1/677.

== Death ==
On 22 Safar 1373 AH, Pur Qazvi travelled to Rangoon with Amir Ahmad Kandhlavi and Muzaffar Husain Ajrarwi. He fell ill during the journey and returned on 20 Jumada II 1373 AH, after which his condition continued to deteriorate. He died on Monday, 2 Dhu'l-Hijja 1373 AH (2 August 1954), in Saharanpur, at approximately 75 years of age. He was buried in Haji Shah Cemetery in Saharanpur, near the graves of his paternal uncle, Maulana Sabit Ali, and his teacher, Inayat Ilahi Saharanpuri.
