= Shahid Saharanpuri =

Indian Islamic scholar (1951–2023)

Maulana Shahid Saharanpuri

Secretary (Ameen-e-Aam) of Mazahir Uloom Jadeed
- In office 13 May 1993 – 6 October 2023
- Preceded by: Talha Kandhlawi

Personal life
- Born: 5 January 1951 Saharanpur, Uttar Pradesh, India
- Died: 6 October 2023 (aged 72) Saharanpur, Uttar Pradesh, India
- Education: Mazahir Uloom Saharanpur
- Occupation: Islamic scholar, author, teacher

Religious life
- Religion: Islam
- Denomination: Sunni Islam
- Jurisprudence: Hanafi
- Movement: Deobandi

Muslim leader
- Teacher: Asadullah Rampuri; Yunus Jaunpuri; Aaqil Saharanpuri; Muzaffar Husain Ajrarwi
- Disciple of: Muhammad Zakariyya Kandhlawi

Shahid Saharanpuri (1951–2023), also written as Muhammad Shahid Hasani Saharanpuri, was an Indian Islamic scholar, author, and teacher. He taught at Mazahir Uloom from 1972 and served as secretary (Ameen-e-Aam) of Mazahir Uloom Jadeed from 1993 until his death in 2023. He wrote on Islamic scholarship and the history of Mazahir Uloom and its scholars, and edited and compiled works associated with his maternal grandfather, Muhammad Zakariyya Kandhlawi.

== Early life and education ==
Muhammad Shahid Saharanpuri was born on 5 January 1951 in Saharanpur, at the residence of his maternal grandfather, Muhammad Zakariyya Kandhlawi. His father, Muhammad Ilyas (d. 2017), was a Hafiz of the Quran. His mother, Shahida Khatoon (d. 2009), was Kandhlawi's fifth and youngest daughter from his first wife.

He began his education at the Khanqah Qadiriyya in Raipur in 28 July 1956 and completed memorisation of the Quran in 26 February 1960. He studied Arabic and Persian before formally enrolling at Mazahir Uloom Saharanpur on 6 February 1966.

At Mazahir Uloom, he studied Sahih al-Bukhari and Sahih Muslim with Yunus Jaunpuri, Sunan Abi Dawud and Sunan al-Nasa'i with Aaqil Saharanpuri, Jami' al-Tirmidhi with Muzaffar Husain Ajrarwi, and Sharh Ma'ani al-Athar with As'adullah Rampuri and Ajrarwi.

Saharanpuri completed the hadith course at Mazahir Uloom in October 1970. From December 1970 to October 1971, he studied further subjects in the institution's advanced course, including Quranic exegesis, jurisprudence, logic and Arabic literature. After completing his studies, he took the oath of allegiance (bay'ah) to Zakariya Kandhlawi and later became his authorised disciple.

== Career ==
Saharanpuri was appointed as a teacher at Mazahir Uloom in Shawwal 1392 AH (1972). He initially taught various Arabic texts and later focused on the translation and interpretation of the Quran, which he continued until his later years.

In 1988, Saharanpuri was appointed a member of the Advisory Committee of Mazahir Uloom. In May 1993, he was elected secretary (Ameen-e-Aam) of Mazahir Uloom Jadeed, succeeding Talha Kandhlawi, and held the position until his death in 2023.

He was also the founder and editor-in-chief of the monthly Yadgar-e-Shaikh, Saharanpur, administrator of the Madrasa al-Shaikh Muhammad Zakariya li-Tahfiz al-Qur'an al-Karim, Saharanpur, and founder of the Shaikh Muhammad Zakariya Siddiqi Muhajir-e-Madani Trust, Saharanpur.

== Personal life ==
On 15 January 1969, Saharanpuri married Sadiqa Khatoon, sister of his fellow student Zubairul Hasan Kandhlawi and daughter of Inamul Hasan Kandhlawi. She died on 7 August 2020. They had three daughters and two sons: Muhammad Salih Hasani Mazahiri, who was appointed Mazahir Uloom's acting secretary after his father's death, and later became its permanent secretary, and Muhammad Yasir Hasani Mazahiri, who serves as an administrator of the Madrasa al-Shaikh Muhammad Zakariya li-Tahfiz al-Qur'an al-Karim, Saharanpur. The three daughters were Sayyida Aisha Siddiqah, Sayyida Sawda, and Sayyida Sumayya.

== Literary works ==
Saharanpuri worked on the history of Mazahir Uloom and its scholars. His grandfather, Zakariya Kandhlawi, had begun work on the history of Mazahir Uloom and its scholars but later entrusted its completion to Saharanpuri. The work was published as Ulama-e-Mazahir Uloom Saharanpur aur Unki Ilmi-o-Tasnifi Khidmat. Its first edition comprised two volumes, while the revised second edition comprised five volumes.

He also wrote Tehreek-e-Azadi Hind aur Mazahir Uloom Saharanpur, a four-volume work on the role of scholars associated with Mazahir Uloom in the Indian independence movement. It contains accounts of about 122 individuals and their activities in the movement.

He also wrote his autobiography, Hayat-e-Musta'ar, which was published in three volumes. A fourth volume was under preparation at the time of his death. He also wrote a book named Do Ilmi Ābashār about the relationship between Mazahir Uloom Saharanpur and Aligarh Muslim University.

He also supervised the publication of previously unpublished writings of Kandhlawi. These included Khabar ma ja'a fi alfaz al-isti'adhah wa juz' hadith innama al-a'mal bi-l-niyyat, Juz' Wafat al-Nabi and Juz' al-Ikhtilaf fi Sifat al-Salah. The published editions included research and annotations by Khursheed Ahmad Azmi.

Among his other work on the writings of Kandhlawi was Taqrir-e-Bukhari Sharif, a six-volume compilation of Kandhlawi's teachings on Sahih al-Bukhari. He also arranged and completed Tarikh-e-Mazahir, including the continuation of the work in its second volume, and completed and arranged Kandhlawi's Tarikh-e-Mashaikh Chisht.

Saharanpuri wrote around 50 books, some of which were published in multiple volumes. His other works included:

- Maktubat-e-Shaikh (a three-volume collection of Kandhlawi's letters, also known as Maktubat-e-Tasawwuf)
- Kutub-e-Fazail par Ishkalat aur un ke Jawabat (a compilation and editing of Kandhlawi's responses to objections concerning Fazail-e-A'māl)
- Akabir ke Khat (a collection of 81 selected letters by Khalil Ahmad Saharanpuri, Abdur Rahim Raipuri, Husain Ahmad Madani, Abdul Qadir Raipuri, Muhammad Ilyas Kandhlawi, and Muhammad Yusuf Kandhlawi)
- Jamia Mazahir Uloom Ahl-e-Kamal ki Nazar Mein (in Urdu and English)
- Muqaddama Fatawa Khaliliya (a detailed introduction to the collected fatwas of Khalil Ahmad Saharanpuri)
- Ma'arif-e-Shaikh (a compilation of the scholarly teachings and insights of Zakariya Kandhlawi)
- Kuch Qayamatein, Kuch Wazahatein (an explanatory work written during a period of unrest at Mazahir Uloom)
- Majlis-e-Shura Sarparastan Mazahir Uloom Saharanpur, Waqiat aur Naza'ir ki Roshni Mein
- Tazkira Danishwaran-e-Saharanpur
- Hayat-e-Maulana Mufti Mahmud Hasan Gangohi
- Sawaneh-e-Maulana Muhammad Inamul Hasan Kandhlawi
- Dawat ki Basīrat aur us ka Fahm-o-Idrāk
- Takhassus-e-Hadith-e-Sharīf
- Fehrist-e-Tālifāt-e-Shaikh (a three-volume detailed introduction to and survey of Kandhlawi's Urdu and Arabic writings)
- Hayat-e-Shaikh (biography of Zakariya Kandhlawi in four volumes)
- Hazrat Ji Thalith ki afātFitnon ki Barsāt
- Fitna-e-Maududiyyat
- Khilāfat-e Usmāniyah kī Baqā mein ʿUlamā-e Mazāhir-e ʿUlūm kā Kirdār (transl. The Role of the Scholars of Mazahir Uloom in the Survival of the Ottoman Caliphate)

== Death ==
Saharanpuri died on 6 October 2023 in Saharanpur, shortly before the evening prayer, at the age of 72. His funeral prayer was held the following morning in the courtyard of Mazahir Uloom Jadeed, led by his uncle, Aaqil Saharanpuri, and he was buried in the ancestral cemetery at Bagh-e-Hakīmān in Saharanpur.
