= List of Mazahir Uloom alumni =

Mazahir Uloom is an Islamic seminary in Saharanpur, India. The following is a list of notable alumni of the seminary. For Mazahir Uloom Jadeed alumni, please see that article.

Name	Introduction	Ref
Abdul Ghani Azhari (1922–2023)	He established the Dar al-‘Ulum Nizamiyya Madinatul Islam in Badshahibagh in Saharanpur.	
Abu Zafar Mohammad Saleh	Bangladeshi Islamic scholar	
Abdul Hafeez Makki	He taught hadith at the Madrasah as-Sawlatiyah	
Abrarul Haq Haqqi	Indian Sufi scholar and mentor	
Muhammad Ali Mungeri	The co-founder of Nadwatul Ulama	
Ghulam Mohammad Vastanvi	Former vice-chancellor of Darul Uloom Deoband	
Habibur Rahman Khairabadi	The Grand Mufti of Darul Uloom Deoband	
Muhammad Idris Kandhlawi	Pakistani scholar and author of Seeratul Mustafa	
Khalil Ahmad Saharanpuri	Author of the Deobandi creed book Al-Muhannad ala al-Mufannad	
Mahmood Hasan Gangohi	Former Grand Mufti of Darul Uloom Deoband	
Saeed Ahmad Palanpuri	Former principal of Darul Uloom Deoband.	
Salman Mazahiri	Former Vice-chancellor of Mazahir Uloom.	
Sanaullah Amritsari	Co-founder of the Jamiat Ulama-e-Hind	
Sultan Ahmad Nanupuri	Founding principal of Al-Jamiah Al-Islamiah Obaidia Nanupur	
Muhammad Yunus Jaunpuri	Indian hadith scholar.	
Yusuf Motala	Founder of the Darul Uloom Bury	
Shah Abdul Wahhab	He was the chief disciple of Ashraf Ali Thanwi in Bengal and the 2nd Rector of Darul Uloom Hathazari.	
Zafar Ahmad Usmani	Pakistani jurist and a founding figure of Pakistan.	

== See more ==
- List of Darul Uloom Deoband alumni
