= Aaqil Saharanpuri =

Indian Islamic scholar (1937–2025)

Maulana Muhammad Aaqil Saharanpuri

Rector of Mazahir Uloom Jadeed
- In office 2020 – 28 April 2025
- Preceded by: Muhammad Salman Mazahiri

Personal life
- Born: 15 October 1937 Saharanpur, United Provinces, British India
- Died: 28 April 2025 (aged 87) Saharanpur, Uttar Pradesh, India
- Education: Mazahir Uloom Saharanpur
- Occupation: Islamic scholar, hadith teacher

Religious life
- Religion: Islam
- Denomination: Sunni Islam
- Jurisprudence: Hanafi
- Movement: Deobandi

Muslim leader
- Teacher: Muhammad Zakariya Kandhlawi; Manzur Ahmad Khan Saharanpuri; As'adullah Rampuri; Amir Ahmad Kandhlawi
- Disciple of: Muhammad Zakariya Kandhlawi

Muhammad Aaqil Saharanpuri (15 October 1937 – 28 April 2025) was an Indian Islamic scholar and hadith teacher. He served as Sadrul Mudarriseen (head of the teaching staff) at Mazahir Uloom Saharanpur. He later served at Mazahir Uloom Jadeed as Sadrul Mudarriseen, Shaykh al-Hadith, and rector.

Saharanpuri was a disciple of Muhammad Zakariya Kandhlawi and assisted in the preparation and annotation of several scholarly works. His writings include al-Durr al-Mandud 'ala Sunan Abi Dawud and Kifāyat al-Muhtadi li-Hall Kitab 'Isa al-Tirmidhi. He was also a member of the consultative councils of Darul Uloom Deoband and Nadwatul Ulama.

== Early life and education ==
Muhammad Aaqil Saharanpuri was born in Saharanpur on 15 October 1937 (9 Sha'ban 1355 AH). His father, Muhammad Ayub, was a religious scholar and physician, while his grandfather, Muhammad Yaqub, was also a physician.

In January 1947, at the age of ten, he completed memorization of the Qur'an. He later enrolled at Mazahir Uloom Saharanpur in 1375 AH, where he completed the Dars-i Nizami curriculum from the elementary level through the Daura-i-Hadith. He graduated after completing the Daura-i-Hadith year in Sha'ban 1380 AH (January 1961), and remained at the institution for a further year to study additional subjects (funoon).

At Mazahir Uloom, he studied Sahih al-Bukhari under Muhammad Zakariya Kandhlawi, Sahih Muslim under Manzur Ahmad Khan Saharanpuri, Sunan Abi Dawud under As'adullah Rampuri, and Jami' al-Tirmidhi and Sunan al-Nasa'i under Amir Ahmad Kandhlawi.

His classmates included Muhammad Yunus Jaunpuri, Shujauddin Hyderabadi, and Ijtibaul Hasan Kandhlawi.

== Career ==
After completing his studies, Saharanpuri began teaching at Mazahir Uloom Saharanpur in Jumada al-Ukhra 1381 AH (December 1961) as a mu'in mudarris (assistant teacher). He was appointed to the permanent teaching staff a year later.

In Shawwal 1386 AH (January 1967), he was appointed a hadith teacher and assigned to teach Mishkat al-Masabih. The following year, he was also assigned to teach Sunan Abi Dawud.

In Dhu'l-Qa'da 1390 AH (January 1971), he succeeded Amir Ahmad Kandhlawi as Sadrul Mudarriseen (head of the teaching staff) at Mazahir Uloom. He held this position until approximately two years before his death. In 1991, he was appointed Nāʾib Nāẓim (deputy rector) of the institution, a position he held until 1992.

He taught Sunan Abi Dawud for approximately fifty years and also taught Jami' al-Tirmidhi and Sahih al-Bukhari. Following the death of Muhammad Yunus Jaunpuri in 2017, he was appointed Shaykh al-Hadith at Mazahir Uloom Jadeed. In 2020, following the death of Muhammad Salman Mazahiri, he succeeded him as Nāẓim (rector) of the institution.

Saharanpuri was a member of the Majlis-i Shura (advisory council) of Darul Uloom Deoband from October 2019, having joined after Muhammad Talha Kandhlawi. He was also a member of the Majlis-i Shura of Nadwatul Ulama.

In Sufism, Saharanpuri was an authorised disciple of Muhammad Zakariya Kandhlawi.

== Literary works ==
Saharanpuri assisted Muhammad Zakariya Kandhlawi in the preparation of several works, including Lami' al-Darari, Faza'il-e-Durood Sharif, Juz' Hajjat al-Wada' wa 'Umrāt al-Nabi, and al-Abwab wa al-Tarajim. His work included locating relevant material and dictating discussions. In February 1978 (Rabi' al-Awwal 1398 AH), he wrote Ta'rif Wajiz 'an Jami'at Mazahir Uloom Saharanpur, a short Arabic work on Mazahir Uloom Saharanpur. He also annotated notes on Rashid Ahmad Gangohi's lessons on Sahih Muslim, which were later published in 644 pages.

His other works included:

- al-Hall al-Mufhim li-Sahih Muslim in two volumes
- Muqaddimat al-Kawkab al-Durri
- al-Fayd al-Sama'i 'ala Sunan al-Nasa'i
- al-Durr al-Mandud 'ala Sunan Abi Dawud
- Malfuzāt-e-Hazrat Shaykh
- Mukhtasar Fada'il-e-Durood Sharif
- Bayān al-Du'a
- Kifāyat al-Muhtadi li-Hall Kitab 'Isa al-Tirmidhi

== Death ==
Saharanpuri died on 28 April 2025 in Saharanpur after a prolonged illness. He was buried in his ancestral cemetery near Tahir Garden in Defence Colony, Saharanpur, following his funeral prayer after Maghrib.

Mahmood Madani, president of Jamiat Ulama-i-Hind (M), expressed condolences on his death. Bilal Abdul Hai Hasani Nadwi, Chancellor of Nadwatul Ulama, also conveyed condolences to his family through a delegation. Khalid Saifullah Rahmani, president of All India Muslim Personal Law Board, also issued a statement expressing condolences, describing Saharanpuri's death as a loss to the scholarly community, particularly students of Islamic sciences.
