= Salman Mazahiri =

Indian Muslim scholar (1946-2020)

Rector of Mazahir Uloom Jadeed
- In office 30 July 1996 – 20 July 2020
- Succeeded by: Aaqil Saharanpuri

Deputy rector of Mazahir Uloom Jadeed
- In office 1992 – 30 July 1996

Personal life
- Born: 10 October 1946 Saharanpur, United Provinces, British India
- Died: 20 July 2020 (aged 73) Saharanpur, Uttar Pradesh, India
- Education: Mazahir Uloom, Saharanpur
- Relatives: Zakariyya Kandhlawi (father-in-law); Muhammad Saad Kandhlawi (son-in-law)

Religious life
- Religion: Islam
- Denomination: Sunni

Salman Mazahiri (10 October 1946 – 20 July 2020) was an Indian Muslim scholar who served as chancellor of Mazahir Uloom Jadeed.

== Early life and education ==
Mazahiri was born on 10 October 1946. Aged 15, he entered Mazahir Uloom, Saharanpur in 1962 (1381 AH) and graduated in 1386 AH. He studied Sahih Bukhari with Zakariyya Kandhlawi, Sahih Muslim, Sunan Nasai, Tirmidhi with Munawwar Hussain, Sunan Abu Dawud with Muzaffar Hussain and Al-Aqidah al-Tahawiyyah with Muhammad Asadullah. He studied Mishkat al-Masabih with Muzaffar Hussain up to the chapter of "major sins" and then completed it with Muhammad Yunus Jaunpuri.

He was a disciple of Talha Kandhlawi.

== Career ==
Mazahiri began teaching at Mazahir Uloom in 1968. In 1972, he taught Tafsir al-Jalalayn and in 1976, became hadith professor in the seminary and taught Mishkat al-Masabih. The managing committee of Mazahir Uloom Jadeed appointed him as Naib Nazim (Deputy Rector) in 1992. Later on 30 July 1996, Mazahiri became the Nazim (Rector). Talha Kandhlawi appointed him as the manager (Sajjada Nashin) of the khanqah of Zakariyya Kandhlawi.

In 2007, Mazahiri rejected the idea of Central Madrasa Board in India. He was a board member of the All India Muslim Personal Law Board and Darul Uloom Nadwatul Ulama.

== Death ==
Mazahiri died on 20 July 2020. Jamiat Ulama-e-Hind President, Arshad Madani expressed grief by saying that Mazahiri's death was a tragedy for Indian Muslims.

== Family life ==
Mazahiri was the son-in-law of Zakariyya Kandhlawi. Tablighi Jamat leader Muhammad Saad Kandhlavi is Mazahiri's son-in-law.
