= Abdur Rahman ibn Yusuf Mangera =

British Islamic scholar (born 1974)

Mufti Abdur Rahman ibn Yusuf Mangera
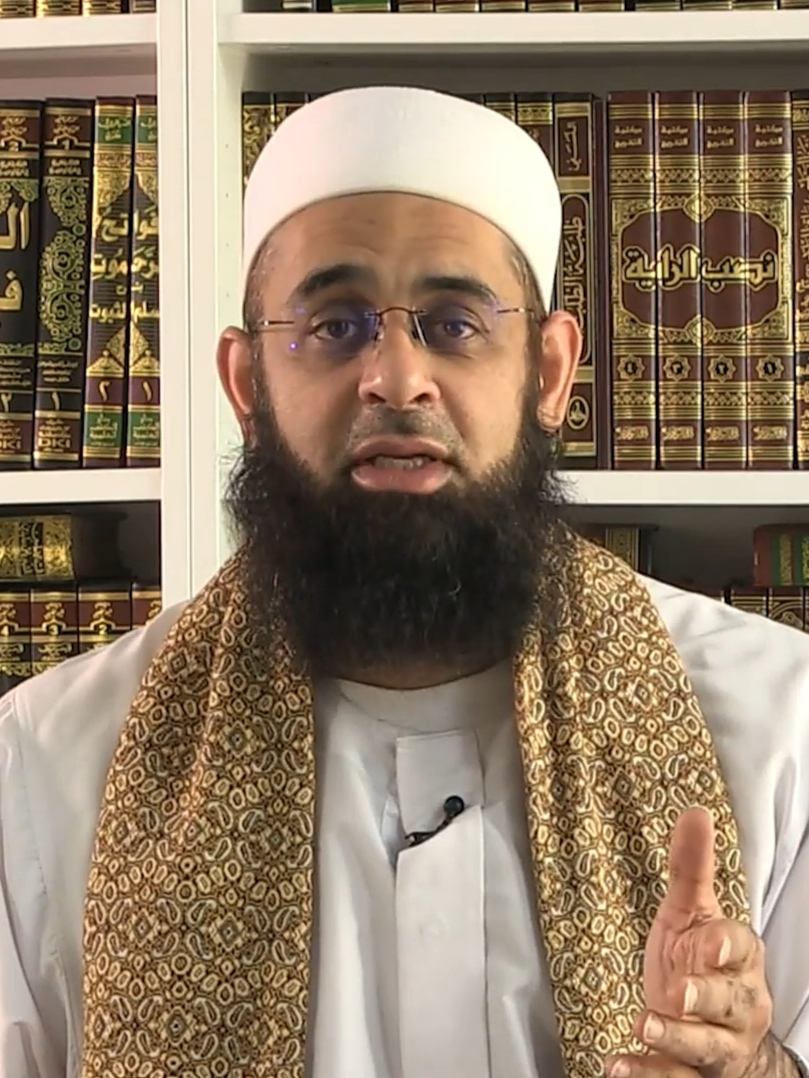
- Mangera in 2022
- Born: 1974 (age 51–52); London, United Kingdom
- Parent: Yusuf Ali Mangera (father)

Academic background
- Thesis: A Critical Edition of Abū’l-Layth al-Samarqandī's Nawāzil (2013)
- Doctoral advisor: Abdul Al-Matroudi

Academic work
- Main interests: Hadith, Fiqh
- Notable works: Fiqh al-Imam: Key Proofs in Hanafi Fiqh
- Website: zamzamacademy.com whitethreadinstitute.org

Personal life
- Region: United Kingdom
- Education: Darul Uloom Bury; Darul Uloom Zakariyya; Mazahir Uloom; Rand Afrikaans University; SOAS, University of London

Religious life
- Religion: Islam
- Denomination: Sunni
- Founder of: Whitethread Institute and ZamZam Academy
- Jurisprudence: Hanafi
- Creed: Maturidi
- Movement: Deobandi

Abdur Rahman ibn Yusuf Mangera (Born 1974) is a Sunni Islamic scholar, author, and founder of Whitethread Institute and Zamzam Academy. He authored Fiqh al-Imam and Healthy Muslim Marriage. He was featured in the 2020 edition of The 500 Most Influential Muslims compiled by the Royal Islamic Strategic Studies Centre.

== Biography ==
Abdur Rahman Mangera was born in 1974 in London to a Gujarati Muslim family. He graduated from Darul Uloom Bury and studied Ifta at the Darul Uloom Zakariyya in South Africa and then at the Mazahir Uloom Jadeed in Saharanpur, India. He received a B.A degree from the Rand Afrikaans University, Johannesburg and an M.A and PhD degree in Islamic Studies from the SOAS, University of London. He is authorized to transmit hadith from Habib Al-Rahman Al-Azmi (through his student Zayn al-‘Abidin), Abul Hasan Ali Hasani Nadwi, Muhammad 'Awwamah, and Muhammad Yunus Jaunpuri.

Mangera established the Whitethread Institute and ZamZam Academy. He was featured in the 2020 edition of The 500 Most Influential Muslims. He was also awarded an honorary fellowship at the Cambridge Muslim College in 2013 and at the Royal Aal al-Bayt Institute for Islamic Thought in Amman, Jordan in 2016. In 2016, he travelled to Kashmir to speak in Imam Abu Hanifa Conference which was organized by Darul Uloom Raheemiyyah in the Convocation Complex of the University of Kashmir.

== Literary works ==
Mangera's books include:

- Fiqh al-Imam: Key Proofs in Hanafi Fiqh (1996)
- Prayers for Forgiveness: Seeking Spiritual Enlightenment through Sincere Supplication (2004)
- Provisions for the Seekers (2005), (translation and commentary of the Arabic work Zad al-Talibin compiled by Ashiq Ilahi Bulandshahri).
- Co-authored Reflections of Pearls (2005)
- Imam Abu Hanifa's Al-Fiqh al-Akbar Explained (2007)
- Salat & Salam: In Praise of Allah's Most Beloved (2007), a manual of blessings and peace upon the Prophet Muhammed
- Imaam Ghazali's Beginning of Guidance (Bidayah al-Hidaya) (2010)
- A Critical Edition of Abū’l-Layth al-Samarqandī's Nawāzil (PhD Thesis, 2013)
- Healthy Muslim Marriage: Unlocking The Secrets to Ultimate Bliss

== See also ==
- List of Hanafis
- List of Ash'aris and Maturidis
- List of Deobandis
