= Saharanpuri =

Saharanpuri (Urdu: سہارنپوری / سہارن پوری, Sahāranpūrī) is a nisbat or surname derived from the name of the city of Saharanpur in India. The Arabic form is as-Saharanfuri (Arabic: السهارنفوري / السهارن فوري, as-Sahāranfūrī) or as-Saharanburi (Arabic: السهارنبوري / السهارن بوري, as-Sahāranbūrī).

== List of persons with the name ==
- Ahmad Ali Saharanpuri
- Khalil Ahmad Anbahtawi Saharanpuri
- Muhammad Zakariya Kandhlawi Saharanpuri
