= Talha Kandhlavi =

Indian Islamic scholar and spiritual person (1941-2019)

Mahammad Talha Kandhlawi

Patron of the Advisory Committee of Mazahir Uloom Jadeed
- In office 28 June 1999 – 12 August 2019

Secretary of Mazahir Uloom Jadeed
- In office 5 March 1985 – 12 May 1993
- Succeeded by: Shahid Saharanpuri

Personal life
- Born: Muhammad Talha; 28 May 1941 Hazrat Nizamuddin, Delhi, British India
- Died: 12 August 2019 (aged 78) Anand Hospital, Meerut, Uttar Pradesh, India
- Resting place: Haji Shah Cemetery, Saharanpur
- Parent: Zakariyya Kandhlawi (father)
- Education: Mazahir Uloom, Saharanpur; Madrasa Kashiful Uloom, Nizamuddin
- Relatives: Ilyas Kandhlawi (maternal grandfather); Yusuf Kandhlawi (maternal uncle); Iftikhar-ul-Hasan Kandhlawi (father in law); Salman Mazahiri (sister's husband)

Religious life
- Religion: Islam
- Denomination: Sunni

Muslim leader
- Disciple of: Muhammad Zakariyya Kandhlawi
- Disciples: Ashiq Ilahi Bulandshahri, Abdul Haq Azmi, Salman Mazahiri, Ahmed Laat, Burhanuddin Sambhali, Abdul Aleem Farooqui, Taqiuddin Nadvi, Abdullah Maroofi, Muhammad Salman Mansoorpuri

Muhammad Talha Kandhlawi (28 May 1941 – 12 August 2019) was an Indian Islamic scholar and Sufi who served as the president of the advisory committee of Mazahir Uloom Jadeed and its secretary. He was the only son of Zakariyya Kandhlawi.

== Early life and education ==
Muhammad Talha Kandhlawi was born on 28 May 1941, in Hazrat Nizamuddin, Delhi. He was the only son of Zakariyya Kandhlawi. His maternal father was Muhammad Ilyas Kandhlawi.

He completed the memorization of the Quran in 1956. He received his primary education from Urdu, Persian to Arabic fourth jointly in Hazrat Nizamuddin and Saharanpur.

In March 1962 (Shawwal 1381 AH), he was officially admitted to Jamia Mazahir Uloom for the first time, where he studied Sharh Jami, the first two volumes of Al-Hidayah, Mishkat al-Masabih, and other texts for one year. Afterward, he returned to Delhi and completed the remainder of his education there. He graduated in Shaban 1384 AH (December 1964) after completing the year of Hadith (Daura-e-Hadith). During this time, he studied Sahih al-Bukhari with Inamul Hasan Kandhlawi, Sharh Ma'ani al-Athar with Muhammad Yusuf Kandhalwi, and other hadith books of the final year with Izharul Hasan Kandhlawi, Obaidullah Balyawi, and Yaqub Saharanpuri.

He pledged allegiance to Abdul Qadir Raipuri on his father's orders. Then, after the death of Raipuri in 1962, he gave himself to the spiritual training of his father, Zakariyya Kandhlawi. In 1393 AH, his father allowed him to pledge allegiance in the presence of Mahmud Hasan Gangohi and Munawwar Hussain Bihari.

== Personal life ==
In 1961, Kandhlawi was married to Najma Khatun, daughter of Iftikhar-ul-Hasan Kandhlawi, with whom he had no children and died on 18 June 2018 at Anand Hospital, Meerut.

== Career ==
On 10 August 1982, Kandhlawi was elected as a member of the advisory committee (majlis-e-shura) of Mazahir Uloom, Saharanpur.

On 5 March 1985, the advisory committee of Mazahir Uloom elected him as the Secretary of Mazahir Uloom Jadeed, from which position he formally resigned on 12 May 1993.

On 28 June 1999, the Advisory Committee of Mazahir Uloom Jadeed elected him as the patron of the committee, which he patronized until his death.

From 2007 till his death in 2019, he was also a member of the Advisory Committee of Darul Uloom Deoband.

He played an important role in the movement for the establishment of Islamic schools (kuttāb) to teach the fundamentals of religion to Muslim children from village to village, city to city.

== Death ==
Kandhlawi died on 12 August 2019 (10 Dhu al-Hijjah 1440 AH) in Anand Hospital, Meerut. His funeral prayer was offered by Arshad Madani in Saharanpur, where he was buried in his ancestral Haji Shah Cemetery.

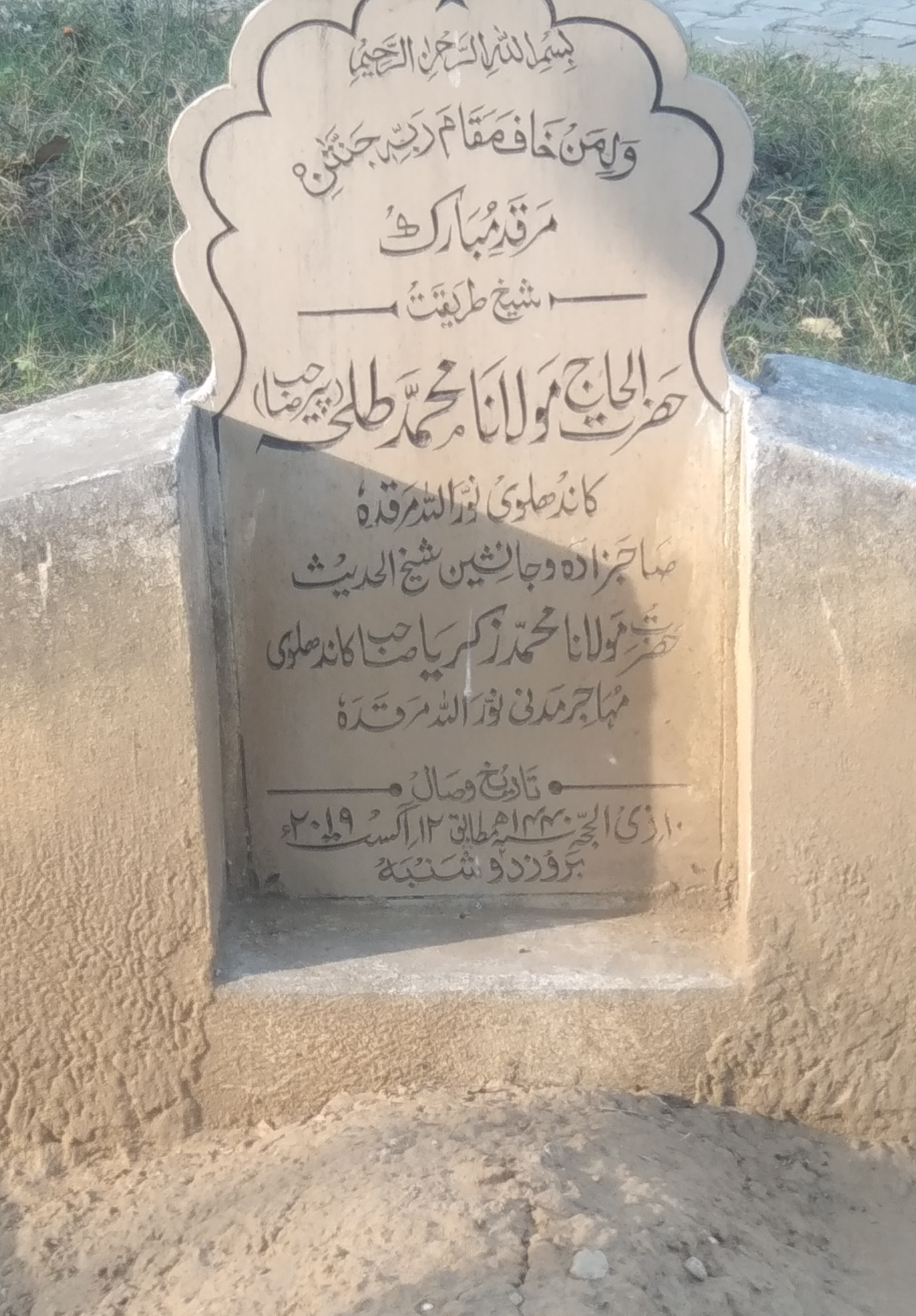
An inscription on the grave of Muhammad Talha Kandhlawi

== See also ==
- List of Deobandis
