= Mazahir Uloom Jadeed =

Islamic seminary in India

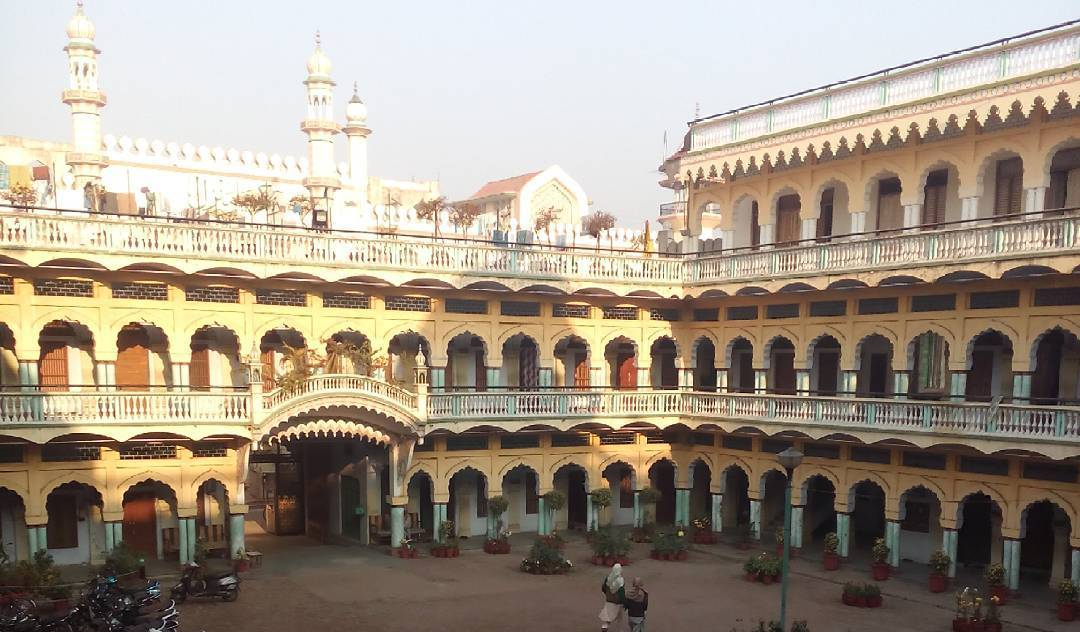
- Type: Islamic seminary
- Established: 13 May 1988; 38 years ago
- Parent institution: Mazahir Uloom (split in 1988)
- Rector: Tahir Qasmi Ghaziabadi
- Location: Saharanpur, Uttar Pradesh, India
- Nickname: Mazahir

Mazahir Uloom Jadeed is an Islamic seminary in Saharanpur, India, which split from the Mazahir Uloom as an independent and separate seminary in 1988. It publishes a monthly journal entitled Mazāhir-e-Uloom. Aaqil Saharanpuri served as rector from 2020 until his death on 28 April 2025. Tahir Qasmi Ghaziabadi became acting rector on 12 May 2025 and permanent rector on 3 August 2025.

== History ==
The seminary split from Mazahir Uloom, and appointed Abdul Azīz as its first rector who served the position from 1986 to 1991. Salman Mazahiri served on the administration from 1996 to 20 July 2020. It was registered under the Societies Registration Act, 1860 in 1988 (1408 AH).

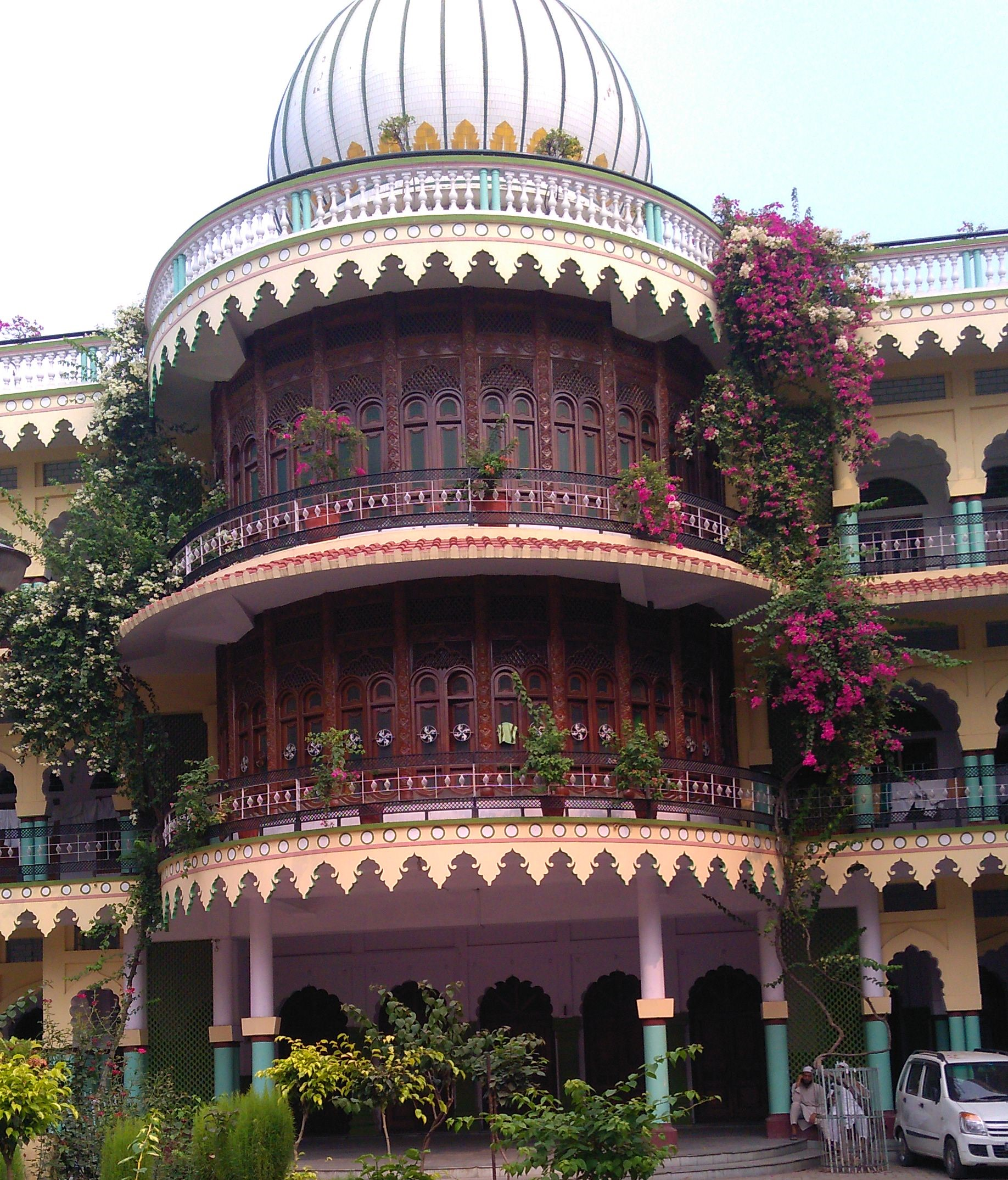
A closer view of the seminary

Following its registration as a society, Mazahir Uloom Jadeed also instituted the position of "Ameen-e-Aam" (Secretary). Talha Kandhlawi held the position from 13 May 1988 until he was succeeded by Shahid Saharanpuri on 13 May 1993.

Aaqil Saharanpuri succeeded Salman Mazahiri as rector in 2020. He held the position until his death on 28 April 2025.

After Saharanpuri's death, Tahir Qasmi Ghaziabadi took charge as acting rector on 12 May 2025. He was appointed permanent rector with effect from 3 August 2025.

== Alumni and faculty ==
=== Faculty ===
- Yunus Jaunpuri, first Sheikh al-Hadith (1988–2017)
- Salman Mazahiri, former vice-chancellor and later chancellor (1992–2020)
- Talha Kandhlawi, former secretary (1985–1996) and patron of the advisory committee (1999–2019)
- Zainul Abideen Azmi, former head of the Department of Specialisation in Hadith (1995–2013)
- Shahid Saharanpuri, former secretary (1985–2023)
- Aaqil Saharanpuri, former rector (2020–2025)

=== Alumni ===
- Abdur Rahman ibn Yusuf Mangera
