= Ahmad Ali Saharanpuri =

Indian Muslim scholar

Aḥmad Alī Sahāranpūrī

Personal life
- Born: 1810 Saharanpur, Mughal India
- Died: 17 April 1880 (aged 69–70) Saharanpur, British India

Religious life
- Religion: Islam
- Denomination: Sunni
- Jurisprudence: Hanafi
- Movement: Deobandi

Ahmad Ali Saharanpuri (1810 – 17 April 1880) was an Indian scholar who played a key role in publishing hadith literature in India. He was among the early teachers of Mazahir Uloom, and is often credited as a founder for his contributions to the development of the seminary. His students include Muhammad Qasim Nanautawi and Shibli Nomani.

== Biography ==
Aḥmad Ali was born in 1810 in Saharanpur. He memorized the Quran in Meerut and studied primary books of Arabic with Sa'ādat Ali Faqīh in Saharanpur. He went to Delhi where he studied under the tutelage of Mamluk Ali Nanautawi. He studied some portions of Sahih Bukhari with Wajīhuddīn Siddīqi and completed the studies of hadith with Shah Muḥammad Ishāq Dehlawi in 1261 AH in Mecca. According to the Indian educationist, Syed Ahmad Khan; Aḥmad Ali studied all the books of hadith including the Sihah Sitta from the start to end with Muḥammad Isḥāq. Abu Salman Shahjahanpuri however points out that Syed Aḥmad Khan's statement that Aḥmad studied Saḥiḥ Bukhāri with Muḥammad Isḥāq should not be accepted. Syed Mehboob Rizwi has quoted Aḥmad Ali saying that he studied major part of Saḥiḥ Bukhāri with Wajīhuddīn Siddīqi in Saharanpur, and then studied it again with Muḥammad Isḥāq in Mecca.

Aḥmad Ali returned to India in 1845 and started "Aḥmadi Press" in Delhi to publish hadith literature. He published his copyedited versions of the Sihah Sitta and copyedited hadith manuscripts throughout his life. He wrote a marginalia to twenty-five chapters of Saḥiḥ Bukhāri. His press suffered loss during the Indian Rebellion of 1857; and he shifted it to Meerut. He spent ten years in Kolkata giving religious discourses in the Hafiz Jamaluddin Masjid. He returned to Saharanpur in 1291 AH, where he taught at the Mazahir Uloom. He was appointed the vice-rector of the seminary after the death of Sa'ādat Ali Faqīh; and made the principal in the absence of Mazhar Nanautawi during 1294 AH. He is often credited as the founder of Mazahir Uloom for his crucial role in the seminary's early development. His students include Pir Syed Meher Ali Shah, Muhammad Qasim Nanautawi, Muhammad Yaqub Nanautawi, Ahmad Hasan Amrohi, Ahsan Nanautawi and Shibli Nomani.

Aḥmad Ali died on 17 April 1880 in Saharanpur. His death was condoled by Syed Ahmad Khan.

== See also ==
- List of Deobandis
