= Anwar Ul Bayan =

Anwar ul Bayan is a five volume commentary (exegesis) on the Quran that was written by Ashiq Elahi Bulandshahri. It was written in Urdu.

== Background about author ==
Ashiq Elahi Bulandshahri was a scholar who died in Madina Munawwara. He was a disciple of Zakariyya Kandhlawi. He stayed in Madina for almost two decades and dedicated his life to the teachings of Quran and sunnah. He also taught in various educational institutes and madaris in India and Pakistan.

== Translations ==
"It has been ably translated into English in South Africa by Maulana Ismail Ebrahim, and edited by Ismail Khathrada and Mufti Afzal Hoosen Elias."

English translation is titled as "The Illuminating Discourses of the Noble Quran"

== See also ==
- Tafsir al-Tabari by Muhammad ibn Jarir al-Tabari
- Tafsir ibn Kathir by Ibn Kathir (1301-1373 CE/ 747 AH).
- Ma'alim al-Tanzil by Hasan bin Mas'ud al-Baghawi
