= Fazail-e-Amaal =

Book by Zakariyya Kandhlawi

Fazail-e-Amaal – Tablighi Nisab
- English cover
- Author: Zakariyya Kandhlawi
- Original title: فضائلِ اعمال
- Language: Urdu
- Subject: Virtues of deeds
- Published: 1929–1964 (as Fada'il series); 1955 (as Tablighi Nisab)
- Publication place: India
- Media type: Print
- ISBN: 978-8171010776 Idara Impex
- OCLC: 942697464
- Dewey Decimal: 297.125
- LC Class: MLCS 2010/41445 (B)
- Website: fazaileamaal.com

Fazail-e-Amaal (Urdu: فضائلِ اعمال), authored by Zakariyya Kandhlawi between 1929 and 1964, is a book that primarily consists of treatises from the Fada'il series, originally published in Urdu. Its purpose is to inspire and motivate Muslims in their religious practices by presenting a diverse range of Islamic teachings, stories, and anecdotes. The book's popularity has led to translations in multiple languages, including English and French, establishing it as a major resource for the Tablighi Jamaat, a transnational pietistic movement. Written at the request of Ilyas Kandhlawi, the founder of Tablighi Jamaat, the book was initially named Tablighi Nisab or Curriculum for Tabligh. It is the most popular ongoing publication of Urdu literature in the present era and is extensively read due to its inclusion in the literature of the Tablighi Jamaat. The book's language is appreciated for its simplicity, clarity, and accessibility to readers.

== Background ==
After the establishment of the Tablighi Jamaat, Ashraf Ali Thanwi used to provide certain books as part of the Tabligh curriculum. For example, books like Bahishti Zewar were included for the students' study and teaching. However, Ilyas Kandhlawi wished to introduce a fixed curriculum and write a permanent book specifically for the Jamaat's students. For this purpose, he instructed his nephew Zakariyya Kandhlawi to write a book that could be included in the curriculum as a standard reference. Consequently, Zakariyya Kandhlawi wrote books on the Virtues of Prayer, Virtues of Remembrance (Dhikr), Virtues of Propagation (Tablig), and Virtues of Charity. Later, upon the request of his paternal cousin Yusuf Kandhlawi, he also wrote a book on the Virtues of Hajj. Following that, as per the instructions of his spiritual mentor, Abdul Qadir Raipuri, he compiled previously written articles such as The Story of the Companions and others. At the command of Shah Yasin Naginawi, a disciple of Rashid Ahmad Gangohi, he combined previously written articles on the Virtues of the Quran and Virtues of Durood. In approximately 1955, a collection of these works was published in two volumes under the title Tablighi Nisab. A single-volume version was published in 1958, and it also became famous under the name Fazail-e-Amaal.

== Methodology ==
This book, concerning the virtues of actions, begins each chapter by mentioning relevant Quranic verses, followed by a detailed explanation and translation of those verses. Subsequently, the chapter includes discussions related to the topic, mentioning relevant hadiths along with their detailed explanations. After the explanation of the hadiths, it includes the sayings of the Companions, the statements of scholars, and their astonishing events. In general, the author's approach in writing the chapters of virtues is as follows: sometimes, he presents the mention of hadiths before Quranic verses. Examples of this can be seen in Fazail-e-Namaz, Fazail-e-Quran, and Fazail-e-Ramadan. Occasionally, he also includes the statements of scholars as an introduction to the authentic hadiths, as observed in Fazail-e-Namaz. Instead, some benefits related to the hadiths are mentioned. The hadiths are used as evidence for the subject matter of the chapter. Sometimes, the text of the hadith is mentioned in Arabic or Urdu, but the rulings associated with the degree of authenticity of the hadith are not mentioned.

== Version ==
Some new Urdu editions also include Muslim Degeneration and its Only Remedy (1939) (Musalmānoṉ kī maujūdah pastī kā wāḥid ‘ilāj) by Ihtishamul Hasan Kandhlawi. English editions include writings such as Six Fundamentals (translation of Ashiq Ilahi Bulandshahri's "Chhe Baten" [Six points]), A Call to Muslims (translation of a 1944 speech by Ilyas Kandhlawi), and Muslim Degeneration and its Only Remedy (1939) (translation of Ihtishamul Hasan Kandhlawi's "Musalmānoṉ kī maujūdah pastī kā wāḥid ‘ilāj"). Some editions of Faza'il-e-A'mal do not contain Zakariya's Virtues of Durood (1965) because it is the last treatise of the Fada'il series, which was published after the publication of the main Tablighi Nisab.

== Translation ==
=== English ===
The first English translation was published in 1960. A revised English edition was published by Kutub Khana Faydi in Lahore in 1980. Another English translation of the book was published in 1984 by Waterval Islamic Institute, Johannesburg, and later became popular in South Africa. In 1985, the translations from the second edition were published in Delhi as Teachings of Islam. The English edition published in Delhi in 1986 contained both parts one and two, but part two was omitted from later versions. Kutub Khana Faydi published the third revised English edition of the book in 1985 as Faza`il A`maal. The 1987 Karachi edition was a reprint of the third edition and was reprinted in England and South Africa. A simple English edition was published in 1995.

=== Bengali ===
==== Early ====
The early Bengali translations of Fazail-e-Amaal have a rich history that spans several decades. In the 1940s, Abdul Majid, the editor of the magazine Nedaye Islam, made the first translation of the Virtues of Prayer from the Fada'il series and another book, both of which were published in Calcutta. Subsequently, when the combined version of the Fada'il series, Tablighi Nisab, was released, Ambar Ali took on the task of translating the entire book, which was published by the Tablighi Library in Dhaka.

Following this, the Fada'il series translation was published by the Ashrafia Library of Dhaka, with the majority of the books translated by Muhibur Rahman Ahmad Jalalabadi. Another translation of this series was published by the Quran Manzil Library, translated by Kazi Abdus Shahid and Nuruzzaman. Aminul Islam, the khatib of Lalbagh Fort Mosque, translated the Virtues of Durood and The Story of the Companions. Abul Lais Ansari also translated The Story of the Companions, which was published by the Islamic Library. However, the most reliable Bengali translation of The Story of the Companions was accomplished by Muzaffar Husain and published by the Emdadia Library in Dhaka.

The translation of the Virtues of Prayer was carried out by Abu Mahmud Hedayet Hossen, a former teacher of Faridabad Madrasa, with a foreword by Abdul Aziz, Amir of Bangladesh Tabligh Jamaat. Although he began translating other books in the series, he couldn't complete them due to his passing. In 1969, Abdullah bin Said Jalalabadi translated Virtues of Ramadan, which was first published by the Bangladesh Islamic Propagation Office in 1975. In 1983 and 1984, Muhammadullah Hafezzi's edition, along with an introduction, was published by the Mahanabi Memorial Council. Later, the complete translation was released by Sakhawatullah from the Tablighi Library. Finally, in 2001, Muhammad Obaidullah obtained permission from the leaders of Tablighi Jamaat Bangladesh to translate the entire work, which was then published by Darul Kitab.

==== Contemporary ====
A new Bengali translation of Fazail-e-Amaal was published in February 2023 by Darul Fikr. This version includes the significance level of each hadith mentioned, and it has been translated into colloquial language. Weakly authenticated hadiths have been marked accordingly.

=== Others ===
The 1985 Kutub Khana Faydi edition has been published in French translation. The English and French translations retain the madrasa idioms and the Uttar Pradesh town background and worldview of the original Urdu books. A Turkish version has also been published titled Ammelerin Faziletleri.

== Reception ==
According to Muhammad Nawaz Chaudhary, a PhD scholar at the University of the Punjab, this work has had a transformative impact on millions of lives, contributing to an ongoing process of construction and reform. Abul Hasan Ali Hasani Nadwi, the Chairman of the Oxford Centre for Islamic Studies, affirms that no other literary series has had a more profound influence in reforming the nation than Zakariyya Kandhlawi's Virtues Books.

=== Criticism ===
Certain scholars have expressed concerns about the inclusion of specific narrations in the book, questioning their authenticity and their alignment with mainstream Islamic teachings. Hammood at-Tuwaijri highlights that the Tablighi Jamaat places significant importance on this book, considering it as revered as Ahl as-Sunnah holds the Saheehayn and other books of hadith. The Tableeghis have made this book their primary reference, particularly among Indians and other non-Arabs who follow their teachings. However, it is worth noting that this book contains various matters related to shirk, innovation (bid'ah), as well as fabricated (mawdoo') and weak (da'if) hadeeths. Consequently, some scholars regard it as a source of evil, misguidance, and confusion (fitnah). Shams ad-Deen al-Afghaani contends that the prominent imams of the Deobandis possess revered books within their tradition, yet these works are saturated with the myths of grave-worshippers and Sufi idolatry. Notably, he cites examples such as Tableeghi Nisaab, also known as Nisaab at-Tableegh, and Manhaj at-Tableegh. Surprisingly, the Deobandis have neither openly disavowed these books nor issued warnings about their content, allowing their printing and sale to continue unchecked. Consequently, these books have become widely available in the markets of India, Pakistan, and elsewhere. According to al-Mawsoo'ah al-Muyassarah fi'l-Adyaan wa'l-Madhaahib wa'l-Ahzaab al-Mu'aasirah, during gatherings in Arab countries, Tablighi Jamaat emphasizes reading from The Meadows of the Righteous. However, in non-Arab countries, they focus on Hayat as-Sahaabah and Tableeghi Nisaab. Unfortunately, the latter book is known for its abundance of myths and weak narrations (da'if hadiths).

Many scholars have risen to the defense of this book. Zakariyya Kandhlawi himself took the initiative to address the criticisms in his publication titled Questions and Answers on the Issues, Objections, and Queries about Fazail-e-Amaal. Within its pages, he provides thorough responses to objections and queries regarding the content of Fazail-e-Amaal. In fact, he dedicates a substantial portion of the book to offer a comprehensive account of its background, popularity, and wide circulation. Furthermore, he presents the viewpoints of both supporters and critics among the scholarly community. Ebrahim Desai clarifies the misconceptions surrounding Fazail-e-A'mal, stating, One common criticism directed towards this book is the presence of weak and fabricated narrations. However, it is important to clarify that there are no fabricated narrations within its pages. While there may be instances of weak narrations, it is crucial to understand that the term 'weak' (da'if) is a technical term employed within the realm of hadith sciences and should not be interpreted in its general sense. Its application follows specific rules outlined within these sciences. Moreover, weak narrations are considered acceptable when discussing the virtues of good deeds, excluding matters related to Aqidah and the rulings of Fiqh. The majority of scholars have endorsed the utilization of weak narrations when elucidating the virtues of good deeds. Even Muhammad al-Bukhari includes weak narrations in his book, Al-Adab al-Mufrad, thereby indicating his acceptance of such narrations in relation to the virtues of good deeds.

== See also ==
- Deobandi hadith studies
- Works of Zakariyya Kandhlawi
