= Ashiq Ilahi Bulandshahri =

Indian Islamic scholar

Aashiq Ilahi Bulandshahri

Personal life
- Born: 1925 Bulandshahr, United Provinces, British India
- Died: 2002 (aged 76–77) Medina, Saudi Arabia
- Resting place: al-Baqi'
- Main interest(s): Tafsir, Hadith
- Notable work(s): Anwar-ul-Bayan, Zaadut Talibin
- Education: Mazahir Uloom Saharanpur

Religious life
- Religion: Islam
- Denomination: Sunni
- Jurisprudence: Hanafi
- Movement: Deobandi

Muslim leader
- Teacher: Zakariyya Kandhlawi
- Disciple of: Talha Kandhlawi

Muḥammad ‘Āshiq Ilāhī Bulandshahrī Muhājir Madanī (Muḥammad ‘Āshiq Ilāhī al-Baranī al-Madanī) was a prominent Indian Islamic scholar. He was a notable student of Zakariyya Kandhlawi.

== Biography ==
Ashiq Ilahi was born in Bulandshahr, United Provinces of British India in 1924 or 1925 (1343 AH). He graduated from Mazahir Uloom in 1363 AH. He was an authorized disciple of Talha Kandhlawi in Sufism.

After completing his education, Ashiq Ilahi taught at various Indian madrasas and moved to Pakistan at the request of Muhammad Shafi in 1384 AH. He taught tafsir and hadith for twelve years at the Darul Uloom Karachi. He later moved to Medina in 1396 AH (1976 CE) where he died in 1422 AH (2002 CE). He was buried in al-Baqi'.

== Literary works ==
His works include:

- Tohfa-e-Khawateen.
- Marne Ke Baad Kya Hōga?
- Islami Adab.
- Huququl Walidayn.
- Anwar Ul Bayan (5 volume Urdu commentary of the Qur'an translated to English by Mufti Afzal Hoosen Elias).
- Zadut Talibin (Translated to English by Abdur Rahman ibn Yusuf Mangera, he also wrote its commentary).
- Al Fawa’idul Saniyya fi Sharhul Arba'een un Nawawiyya.
- At Tashil ud Daruri fi Masa’ilul Quduri.

== See also ==
- List of Deobandis
