= Abdur Rahim Raipuri =

Indian Islamic scholar and Sufi (1855–1919)

Shah Abdur Rahim Raipuri
- Title: Shah

Personal life
- Born: 1855 Ambala, Punjab, India
- Died: 27 January 1919 (aged 63–64) Raipur, Saharanpur, India
- Resting place: Raipur
- Main interest(s): Islamic education, Sufism, Quranic teaching
- Notable work(s): Establishment of maktabs (Quranic schools)

Religious life
- Religion: Islam
- Denomination: Sunni
- Movement: Deobandi

Senior posting
- Teacher: Rashid Ahmad Gangohi, Khalil Ahmad Saharanpuri
- Influenced: Abdul Qadir Raipuri

Shah Abdur Rahim Raipuri (Arabic: الشيخ عبد الرحيم الرائ فوري, 1855–1919; 1272–1337 AH) was an Indian Islamic scholar, Sufi, and mentor associated with the Deobandi movement. He served as the spiritual guide (murshid) to many disciples and as a senior patron of Darul Uloom Deoband and Mazahir Uloom Saharanpur.

== Early life and education ==
Shah Abdur Rahim Raipuri was born in 1855 (1272 AH) in the village of Ambala, Punjab, India, to Rao Ashraf Ali Khan. His family later settled in Raipur, Saharanpur district. He received his early education in his native village, Takri, and pursued advanced religious studies in Rampur and Saharanpur. Among his teachers was Khalil Ahmad Saharanpuri.

During his youth, he developed a deep spiritual connection with Rashid Ahmad Gangohi, whom he first met as a child. Later, he became a disciple (murid) of Shah Abdul Rahim Saharanpuri and was formally authorized in the Sufi path (ijazah).

== Career ==
Raipuri was known for his asceticism, humility, and devotion to Islamic learning. He played a leading role in establishing and supervising religious and Quranic schools (maktabs) in his region. His residence near the Jamna canal in Raipur became a center for spiritual instruction and guidance. He emphasized simplicity, seclusion, and continuous remembrance of God.

He was appointed a member of the governing council (Majlis-e-Shura) of Darul Uloom Deoband in 1902 (1320 AH). When Mahmud Hasan Deobandi departed for the Hejaz in 1914 (1333 AH), Raipuri was chosen as the senior patron (sarparast) of the seminary and continued in this position until Mahmud Hasan’s return from Malta in 1918 (1337 AH).

He also served as a patron of Mazahir Uloom Saharanpur, maintaining close ties with its rector, Khalil Ahmad Saharanpuri.

== Literary works ==
Although Raipuri did not leave behind formal writings, his teachings and sayings were preserved by disciples and later chroniclers. His biography and spiritual practices are recorded in works such as Sawānih-e-Maulana Shah Abdur Rahim Raipuri (Urdu: سوانحِ مولانا شاہ عبد الرحیم رائے پوری, Biography of Maulana Shah Abdur Rahim Raipuri) by Abdul Khaliq Azad Raipuri.

His personality and contributions are also discussed in Mashāhīr-e-Ulama-e-Deoband (Notables Among the Scholars of Deoband) by Qari Fuyūz ar-Rahman.

== Death and legacy ==
Raipuri died on 25 Rabi al-Thani 1337 AH (27 January 1919 CE) in Raipur, Saharanpur. He was buried in the same garden where he spent the final years of his life, near the mosque on its southern side.

He was succeeded spiritually by his disciple Abdul Qadir Raipuri. His devotion to Quranic recitation, emphasis on moral reform, and establishment of Quranic schools left a lasting impact on the Deobandi movement in northern India.
