= Mazhar Nanautawi =

Indian Muslim scholar

Muḥammad Mazhar Nanautawi

Personal life
- Born: 1821 Nanauta, Mughal India
- Died: 3 October 1885 (aged 63–64)
- Education: Zakir Husain Delhi College
- Relatives: Siddiqi family of Nanauta

Religious life
- Religion: Islam

Muḥammad Mazhar Nanautawi (1821–1885) was an Indian Muslim scholar and a freedom struggle activist who played a crucial role in the development Mazahir Uloom. He participated in the Battle of Shamli.

== Biography ==
Muḥammad Mazhar was born into the Siddiqi family of Nanauta in 1821. His father Lutf Ali was a cousin brother of Mamluk Ali Nanautawi. Mazhar memorized the Quran and received his primary education from his father. He studied with Mamluk Ali Nanautawi at the Delhi College. He studied Muwatta Imam Malik and few other hadith books with Shah Abd al-Ghani Dehlawi and Sahih Bukhari with Shah Muḥammad Ishāq Dehlawi. He was an authorized disciple of Rashid Ahmad Gangohi in Sufism.

Mazhar was appointed the head teacher of Arabic department of the Government College in Varanasi by Aloys Sprenger. He later headed the Arabic department of Government College, Ajmer. He also taught at the Agra College. Mazhar participated in the Indian freedom struggle and fought alongside Imdadullah Muhajir Makki in the Battle of Shamli. His views about working in government institutes changed after 1857. He joined the Nawal Kishore Press as a copy editor and worked there for more than seven years. His copyedited works include Al-Ghazali's Ihya al-Ulūm and Tāhir Patni's Majma' al-Bahhār; the latter being the major academic work of that time. In February 1867, Mazhar joined the Mazahir Uloom; where he taught the subjects including tafsir, hadith, fiqh, literature and history. He is credited as the founder of Mazahir Uloom for his role in its development.

Mazhar died on 3 October 1885. His students included Muhammad Qasim Nanautawi and Khalil Ahmad Saharanpuri.
