= Yunus Jaunpuri =

Indian Islamic Scholar (1937–2017)

Muḥammad Yūnus Jaunpūrī
- Yunus Jaunpuri (center) during a ceremony in Saharanpur.

Personal life
- Born: Muhammad Yunus bin Shabbir Ahmad al-Jaunpuri; 2 October 1937 Jaunpur, United Provinces, British India
- Died: 11 July 2017 (aged 79) Saharanpur
- Main interest(s): Study of hadith, Tazkiyat al-Nafs, Sufism
- Notable work: Nibrās al-Sārī ilā Riyāḍ al-Bukhārī

Religious life
- Religion: Islam
- Denomination: Sunni
- Jurisprudence: Ḥanafī
- Creed: Atharī
- Movement: Deobandi

Muslim leader
- Disciple of: Zakariyya Kandhlawi
- Influenced by: Abu Hanifah an-Nu'man, Ibn Taymiyyah, Abu al-Layth al-Samarqandi, 'Abd al-Hayy al-Laknawi
- Influenced: Abdur Rahman ibn Yusuf Mangera

Muḥammad Yūnus Jaunpūrī (1937–2017) was an Islamic scholar, muhaddith and leading cleric of the Deobandi movement. He was a student and close disciple of Zakariyya Kandhlawi, a fellow Deobandi cleric and a prominent leader of the Tablighi Jamaat. Jaunpuri was also a senior professor of hadith at the Mazahir Uloom in Saharanpur, authoring works on the subject of hadith such as Nibrās al-Sārī.

== Biography ==
Muhammad Yunus bin Shabbir Ahmad al-Jaunpuri was born in the city of Jaunpur on 2 October 1937. Graduating from the Deobandi institution of Mazahir Uloom in 1961, he later became a student of leading Deobandi cleric and Tablighi Jamaat preacher, Zakariyya Kandhlawi. After he had received an ijazah to teach his own classes and be authorized as a scholar, Jaunpuri taught the classical six hadith compilations, including Sahih al-Bukhari, at the Mazahir Uloom. Due to his knowledge in the field of hadith sciences, Jaunpuri became a muhaddith and was appointed as the chief professor of hadith studies at the Mazahir Uloom and given the status of a leading cleric within the Deobandi movement. He also delved into Sufism and asceticism, delivering lectures and classes about the concepts of Tazkiyat al-Nafs and self-purification. Like majority of the Deobandis, Jaunpuri adhered to the Hanafi school and was a supporter of Sufism, but unlike most Deobandis, he adhered to the Athari school of theology, instead of Maturidism.

Yunus Jaunpuri died on 11 July 2017 in Saharanpur. Over a million people, including his students, attended the funeral procession. It was led by Talha Kandhlawi, a son of Zakariyya Kandhlawi. International Islamic scholar, Mufti Menk, expressed grief over the demise of Jaunpuri. Likewise, Fuzail Ahmad Nasiri, a Deobandi scholar and poet, expressed his grief and eulogized Jaunpuri, saying that he was an exemplary scholar in the field of hadith.

== Works ==
- Nibrās al-Sārī ilā Riyāḍ al-Bukhārī (The Lantern of the Night-Traveler to the Gardens of al-Bukhārī), a multi-volume commentary on Sahih al-Bukhari with explanations on how the narrations are adopted by Hanafi jurisprudence. While writing the commentary, Jaunpuri includes footnotes from prominent Islamic khalaf such as Ibn al-Qayyim, Ibn Taymiyyah, Abu al-Layth al-Samarqandi, and 'Abd al-Hayy al-Laknawi, with the aim of quoting prominent scholars that are not restricted to the Hanafi school, as Jaunpuri intended for his work to reach an audience outside of Hanafi adherents.
- Al-Yawāqīt al-Ghāliyah al-Aḥādīth al-‘Āliyah (The Precious Rubies of the Lofty Prophetic Traditions) a work in four volumes which is a compilation of lectures, essays and treatises written by Jaunpuri regarding the study of hadith and narrations from the Islamic prophet Muhammad.

== See also ==
- Deobandi movement
- List of Hanafis
- List of Atharis
- List of Mazahir Uloom alumni
