= Zakariyya Kandhlavi =

Indian Islamic scholar (1898–1982)

Mawlana Muhammad Zakariya Kandhlawi
- Title: Shaykh al-Hadith; Qutb al-Aqtab; Barakat al-`Asr

Personal life
- Born: Muhammad Zakariya; 2 February 1898 Kandhla, North-Western Provinces, British India
- Died: 24 May 1982 (aged 84) Medina, Saudi Arabia
- Resting place: Jannat-ul-Baqi British Indian (1898-1947) Indian (1947-1982); Saudi Arabian (1976-1982)
- Main interest(s): Hadith studies, Sufism
- Notable work(s): Awjaz al-Masalik; Al-Abwab wa at-Tarajim; Faza'il series Khasa'il-i Nabawi
- Education: Mazahir Uloom Saharanpur
- Occupation: Islamic scholar, Sufi shaykh, Author, Teacher
- Relatives: Salman Mazahiri (son-in-law) Aaqil Saharanpuri (son-in-law)

Religious life
- Religion: Islam
- Denomination: Muslim
- Jurisprudence: Hanafi
- Tariqa: Chishti (Sabiri-Imdadi)
- Movement: Deobandi

Muslim leader
- Disciple of: Khalil Ahmad Saharanpuri (Granted khilafah)
- Students: Abu Zafar Mohammad Saleh
- Influenced by: Muhammad Yahya Kandhlawi, Khalil Ahmad Saharanpuri, Muhammad Ilyas Kandhlawi, Husain Ahmad Madani
- Influenced: Shaykh Yunus Jaunpuri

Muhammad Zakariyya Kandhlavi (2 February 1898 – 24 May 1982), also written as Muḥammad Zakarīyā Ṣiddīqī Kāndhlawī Sahāranpūrī Muhājir Madanī, was a Sunni Hanafi Hadith scholar of the Deobandi school of Islamic thought in India, popularly known as a "Hazrat Shaykh al-Hadith" and an influential ideologue of Tablighi Jamaat, the missionary and reform movement founded by his uncle Maulana Muhammad Ilyas. His notable works are Awjaz al-Masalik, an Arabic commentary in six volumes on Imam Malik's Muwatta, and Khasa'il-i Nabawi, an Urdu translation and commentary on Imam at-Tirmidhi's Shama'il.

== Name ==
His ism (given name) was Muhammad Zakariya. His nasab (patronymic) is as follows: Muḥammad Zakarīyā ibn Muḥammad Yaḥyá ibn Muḥammad Ismā‘īl ibn G͟hulām Ḥusain ibn Ḥakīm Karīm Bak͟hsh ibn Ḥakīm G͟hulām Muḥīyuddīn ibn Maulawī Muḥammad Sājid ibn ibn Maulawī Muḥammad Faiz̤ ibn Maulawī Muḥammad Sharīf ibn Maulawī Muḥammad Ashraf ibn Shaik͟h Jamāl Muḥammad Shāh ibn Shaik͟h Bāban Shāh ibn Shaik͟h Bahā’uddīn Shāh ibn Maulawī Shaik͟h Muḥammad ibn Shaik͟h Muḥammad Fāz̤il ibn Shaik͟h Quṭb Shāh.

His name is usually mentioned with one or more nisbahs (attributive adjectives). He was Kandhlawi (of Kandhla) by origin, then Gangohi (of Gangoh), then Saharanpuri (of Saharanpur), then Madani (of Medina). Muhajir Madani indicates his hijrah (immigration) to the Islamic holy city of Medina. By lineage he was Siddiqi, denoting descent from Abu Bakr.

== Early life and education ==
Muhammad Zakariya was born at 11 pm on Thursday, 11 Ramadan 1315 AH (Wednesday, 2 February 1898) (Note: In the Islamic calendar, the weekday begins at sunset.) in the house of his mother's step-grandmother, Maryam, in the town of Kandhla in the present-day state of Uttar Pradesh, India. He was born to a family of Islamic scholars that traced their ancestry to Abu Bakr as-Siddiq, a companion of the Islamic prophet, Muhammad.

Zakariya's father, Muhammad Yahya Kandhlawi was a student and disciple of Rashid Ahmad Gangohi. Born in 1287 AH (1870/1871), he received his early education from his father and later studied hadith under Maulana Gangohi and Maulana Khalil Ahmad Saharanpuri. He would routinely recite the entire Qur'an daily. After completing dawrah of hadith with Maulana Gangohi, Yahya stayed with him in Gangoh. Maulana Yahya's father, Maulana Muhammad Ismail Jhanjhanawi died twenty days after the birth of Zakariya, who would be Yahya's only son.

=== Early education in Gangoh ===
In 1318 AH (1900), at the age of two, Zakariya moved to Gangoh, where his father lived with Maulana Gangohi. In Gangoh, Zakariya was one of eighty students who studied in his father's madrasah. His education began with Hakim `Abd ar-Rahman of Muzaffarnagar, a pious doctor, with whom he studied Qa`idah Baghdadi, a common primer for learning Arabic script. He then began hifz (memorizing the Qur'an) with his father, who required students to revise their daily lesson 100 times. After hifz, books studied included Bahishti Zewar, Hamasah, the first volume of Hidayah, and other books in Urdu and Persian. The introductory books of Persian were taught by his uncle, Muhammad Ilyas, while the books of Arabic grammar (sarf and nahw) were taught by his father.

In Gangoh, Zakariya saw many times his father's shaykh, Rashid Ahmad Gangohi, with whom he had an affectionate fatherly relationship. Gangohi died on 8 Jumada ath-Thani 1323 AH (11 August 1905), when Zakariya was seven.

=== Start of studies at Mazahir Uloom Saharanpur ===
In Rajab 1328 AH (July 1910), at the age of 12, Muhammad Zakariya traveled with his father to Saharanpur to attend Mazahir Uloom Saharanpur, where his father had moved to teach hadith at the request of Khalil Ahmad Saharanpuri. Zakariya began studying texts on Arabic grammar, morphology, literature, and logic. Texts studied with his father included Sarf-i Mir, Panj Ganj, Fusul-i Akbari, Kafiyah, Qasidah Burdah, Qasidah Banat Su`ad, as well the 30th juz' of the Qur'an and a collection of 40 hadith. His teachers in the rational sciences were Maulana `Abd al-Wahid Sanbhali and Maulana `Abd al-Latif, the nazim (director) of the madrasah.

=== Dawrah of hadith ===
The year 1333 AH (1914/1915) was Zakariya's final year of studies, known in the Dars-i Nizami curriculum as dawrah of hadith, and involving intensive study of hadith. Zakariya was strictly observant in never missing a lesson and always studying with wudu (ablution). He studied the six major hadith collections under his father, with the exception of Sunan ibn Majah, which he studied with Maulana Thabit `Ali. When his father was teaching him, Zakariya was treated differently from the other students. For example, he writes that when studying the hadith collection Mishkat al-Masabih, he was not allowed to refer to Mazhar-i Haq, its Urdu translation and commentary. Another rule in his studies was that he had to state whether or not a hadith was consistent with Hanafi fiqh, and, if not, support the position taken by the Hanafi school. Zakariya completed his studies and graduated in 1333 (1915).

In 1333 AH (1915), Zakariya gave bay'ah (oath of allegiance to a Sufi shaykh) at the hand of Khalil Ahmad Saharanpuri before the latter left for Hijaz.

On 10 Dhu al-Qi'dah 1334 (September 1916), when Zakariya was 18, his father died.

Maulana Saharanpuri returned to India at about the same time. In 1334 (1916) he requested Zakariya to study Sahih al-Bukhari and Jami` at-Tirmidhi a second time with him. He then selected Zakariya to assist him in writing Badhl al-Majhud, a commentary on Sunan Abi Dawud.

== Teaching career ==
After completing his academic studies, Muhammad Zakariya was appointed as a teacher at Mazahir Uloom on 1 Muharram 1335 AH (c. 29 October 1916). At the age of 18, he was one of the youngest members of the staff. He was initially assigned to teach books on Arabic grammar, morphology, and literature, as well as some primary texts of Islamic jurisprudence. He later advanced to teaching books of hadith and other daurah books.

The initial books he was assigned were ‘Ilm aṣ-ṣīghah, Mi’at ‘āmil manẓum, Sharḥ mi’at ‘āmil, Khulāṣah naḥw mīr, Nafḥat al-yaman, Munyat al-muṣallī, *Uṣūl ash-Shāshī, and Qāla aqūl. The next term, from Shawwal 1335 AH (1917), he taught Mirqāt, Qudūrī, Sharḥ Tahdhīb, Kāfiyah, Nūr al-iḍāḥ, Uṣūl ash-Shāshī, Sharḥ Jāmī, Baḥth fa‘l, Baḥth ism, ‘Ajab al-‘ujāb, and Nafḥat al-yaman. In Shawwal 1336 AH (1918) there was further promotion; he was given higher books including Maqāmāt, Sab‘ah mu‘allaqah, Quṭbī, Mīr Qutbī, and Kanz ad-daqā’iq. In Shawwal 1337 AH (1919) he was given Ḥamāsah and Hidāyah awwalīn. At the end of term in Shaban 1338 AH (1920), Zakariya traveled with Khalil Ahmad to the Hejaz and performed his first Hajj. He returned to Saharanpur in Safar 1339 AH (1920).

The books Zakariya taught in each of the next few years are not recorded in detail, but he writes that he was given Quṭbī, Mīr Qutbī, Tahdhīb, and Sharḥ Tahdhīb nearly every year, as the more senior teachers disliked teaching mantiq (logic). He also taught Hidāyah awwalīn a total of three times, and Nūr al-anwār followed by Husāmī three times.

Beginning in 1341 AH (1923), he was given books of hadith to teach. On the instruction of Maulana Khalil Ahmad, in Rajab 1341 AH (1923) three sections of Sahih al-Bukhari were transferred to Zakariya from Maulana Abdul Latif, the madrasah's nazim (administrator/principal). In the next three terms, from Shawwal 1341 to Shaban 1344 AH (1923–1926), he taught Mishkat al-Masabih. In Shawwal 1344 AH (1926) he traveled once again to the Hejaz, this time staying there for over a year. After performing Hajj, he arrived in Medina in Muharram 1345 AH (1926). During his stay there he taught Sunan Abu Dawud at Madrasah al-`Ulum ash-Shar`iyah.

Upon Zakariya's return to Saharanpur in Safar 1346 AH (1927), Sunan Abu Dawud was transferred to him from Maulana Abdul Latif. In this year he also taught Sunan an-Nasa'i, Muwatta Malik in the transmission of ash-Shaybani, and parts 12 to 16 of Sahih al-Bukhari. After Eid al-Adha the first volume of Sahih al-Bukhari was transferred to Zakariya, while the second volume remained with Maulana Abdul Latif. From Safar 1346 AH onward Zakariya also taught Jami' at-Tirmidhi, Sahih Muslim, and other daurah books when teachers were unavailable due to sickness or travel.

In 1373 AH (1954) Maulana Abdul Latif was unavailable due to travel, so Zakariya was given both volumes of Bukhari to teach in addition to his usual assignment of Abu Dawud. The same arrangement was made in 1374 AH (1955) when Abdul Latif was ill. In 1375 AH (1956), after the death of Maulana Abdul Latif, Sunan Abu Dawud was transferred to Maulana As'adullah, and Sahih al-Bukhari was transferred to Maulana Zakariya.

Zakariya continued to teach until 1388 AH (1968), when he developed cataracts in his eyes - a defect in his vision. In total, he taught half of Sahih al-Bukhari 25 times, the complete work 16 times, and Sunan Abi Dawud 30 times.

== Expertise ==
Syrian scholar Abd al-Fattah Abu Ghudda, in a letter he wrote to Shaykh Zakariyya, states:

To his eminence, the shaykh, the magnificent imām, the jurist, the ḥadīth master, the

outstanding noble scholar, the fragrance of India and the Ḥijāz, the tongue of the people of reality and metaphor, our master and our blessing, Shaykh Muḥammad Zakariyyā - may his lofty shadow be lengthened and his precious life be blessed. Āmīn.

From the needy slave, your admirer, ʿAbd al-Fattāḥ Abū Ghuddah.

Muhammad Zakariyya al-Kandhlawi also supported the Tablighi Jamaat movement in India and Pakistan. His written essays, based on hadith, are required reading for people of Tablighi Jamaat.

== Death ==
Muhammad Zakariya fell ill on Sunday 16 May 1982 in the city of Medina, Saudi Arabia. His condition deteriorated a week later resulting in serious breathing problems on Monday 24 May 1982. The shaykh's body was prepared for burial through washing before the Sunset prayers and burial took place after the night prayer (Isha) on the same day.

The funeral prayers were led by the Imam of the Prophet's Mosque, Shaykh Abdullah al-Zahim, and the body was taken for burial in the nearby Jannatul Baqi graveyard. Muhammad Zakariya's wish was to be buried close to the Prophet's family members (ahl al-bayt) and as per his wish, his grave was dug just outside their enclosure.

== Sufism ==
In 1333 AH (1914 or 1915 CE), Muhammad Zakariya gave bay'ah at the hands of Khalil Ahmad Saharanpuri, taking him as his spiritual guide.

During his second journey to Hijaz with Khalil Ahmad, his sheikh conferred upon him khilafah in four silsilas (Chistiyya, Suhrawardiyya, Qadiriyya and Naqshbandiyya).

== Household ==
Muhammad Zakariya married twice. He first married the daughter of Shaikh Ra'uf ul Hasan in Kandhla. She bore him eight children: three sons and five daughters. She died on the 5th of Dhu l-Hijja, 1355 AH (16 FEB 1937). He then married his first cousin, the daughter of Muhammad Ilyas, in 1356 AH (1938 A.D.). She bore him three children: one son and two daughters.

== Notable students ==
His notable students include Muhammad Yunus Jaunpuri and Yusuf Motala and Molana Mazhar Alam while Mufti Taqi Usmani has authorization in Hadith from Hazrat Shaikh.

== Written works ==
Muhammad Zakariya authored works both in Arabic and Urdu. A number of them treat specialized subjects intended for scholars and the rest have been written for the general public.

His first written work was a three-volume commentary of Alfiyah Ibn Malik, which he wrote as a student when he was only thirteen.

His work, Fadha'il-e-Qur'an has been translated into eleven languages, Fadha'il-e-Ramadan into twelve languages, and Fadha'il-e-Salaah into fifteen languages.

According to Wali ad-Din Nadwi, Muhammad Zakariya wrote 4 books on tafsir and tajwid, 44 books on hadith and its related sciences, 6 books on fiqh and its related sciences, 24 historical and biographical books, 4 books on aqidah, 12 books on zuhd (abstinence) and riqaq (heart-softening accounts), 3 books on Arabic grammar and logic, and 6 books on modern-day groups and movements.

According to Muhammad Shahid Saharanpuri (Muhammad Zakariya's maternal grandson), his written works amount to 103, of which 42 have been published and 61 remain unpublished. He wrote 2 books on tafsir, 60 books on hadith, 4 books on fiqh and usul al-fiqh, 22 books on tarikh and sirah, 2 books on tajwid and qira'ah, 3 books on Arabic grammar, classical logic, and geometry, 3 books on suluk and ihsan, 4 books in defense of Islam, and 3 books on miscellaneous subjects.

=== Arabic works ===
- Awjaz al-Masalik ila Muwatta' Malik (أوجز المسالك إلى موطأ مالك, Awjaz al-Masālik ilá Muwaṭṭa’ Mālik)
- Lami` ad-Darari `ala Jami` al-Bukhari (لامع الدراري على جامع البخاري)
- Al-Kawkab ad-Durri `ala Jami` at-Tirmidhi (الكوكب الدري على جامع الترمذي, al-Kawkab ad-Durrī ‘alá Jāmi‘ at-Tirmidhi)
- Al-Abwab wa at-Tarajim li Sahih al-Bukhari (الابواب والتراجم لصحيح البخاري, al-Abwāb wa at-Tarājim li-Ṣaḥīḥ al-Bukhārī)
- Juz' Hajjat al-Wida` wa `Umrat an-Nabi (جزء حجة الوداع وعمرات النبي, Juz' Ḥajjat al-Widā‘ wa ‘Umrāt an-Nabī)

=== Urdu works ===
- Shama'il Tirmidhi ma` Urdu Sharh Khasa'il Nabawi
- Faza'il-e-A'maal (فضائل اعمال)
  - Faza'il-e-Quran (فضائلِ قرآن)
  - Faza'il-e-Ramadan (فضائلِ رمضان)
  - Faza'il-e-Tabligh (فضائلِ تبلیغ)
  - Faza'il-e-Namaaz (فضائلِ نماز)
  - Faza'il-e-Hajj (فضائلِ حج)
  - Faza'il-e-Sadaqat (فضائلِ صدقات)
  - Faza'il-e-Zikr (فضائلِ ذکر)
  - Faza'il-e-Durood-Sharif (فضائلِ درود شریف)
  - Faza'il-e-Tijarat (فضائلِ تجارت)
  - Hikayat-e-Sahabah (حکایت صحابہ)
- Al-I`tidal fi Maratib ar-Rijal (الإعتدال في مراتب الرجال), also known as Islami Siyasat (اسلامی سیاست)
- Dari ka Wujub (داڑھی کا وجوب)
- Aap Beti"Part 1"part2 (آپ بیتی)
- Shari`at wa Tariqat ka Talazum (شریعت و طریقت کا تلازم)
- Um al-Amrad
- Fitna-e-Maududiat (فتنہ مودودیت)
- Maut ki Yad (موت کی یاد)
- Tarikh Masha'ikh-e-Chisht (تاریخ مشائخ چشت)
- Ikhtilaf al-A'immah
- Jama`at-e-Tabligh par I`tarazat ki Jawabat (جماعت تبلیغ پر اعتراضات کے جوابات)
- Miswak (مسواک)
- Nisbat-o-Ijazat
- Sila' Rahmi
- Akabir ka Suluk o Ihsan
- Namaz ki Ahmiat
- Ulama e Akhirat ki Pehchan
- Akabir ka Ramadan

== See also ==
- Muhammad Yusuf Kandhlawi
- Muhammad Ilyas Kandhlawi
