= Khalil Ahmad Saharanpuri =

Indian Islamic scholar and sufi saint of Hindustan

Khalil Ahmad Saharanpuri خلیل احمد سہارنپوری

Personal life
- Born: Khalil Ahmad; December 1852 Ambehta, British India
- Died: 13 October 1927 (aged 74) Medina, Kingdom of Hejaz and Nejd
- Resting place: Jannat al-Baqi` Medina, Saudi Arabia
- Main interest: Hadith studies
- Notable work(s): Badhl Al-Majhud Fi Hall Abi Dawud; Al-Muhannad 'ala al-Mufannad
- Education: Mazahir Uloom Saharanpur
- Relatives: Mamluk Ali Nanautawi (maternal grandfather), Muhammad Yaqub Nanautawi (maternal uncle)

Religious life
- Religion: Islam
- Denomination: Sunni
- Jurisprudence: Hanafi
- Tariqa: Chishti (Sabiri-Imdadi)
- Movement: Deobandi

Muslim leader
- Disciple of: Imdadullah Muhajir Makki
- Students: Badre Alam Merathi
- Influenced by: Rashid Ahmad Gangohi, Muhammad Yaqub Nanautawi, Muhammad Mazhar Nanautawi, Ahmad Zayni Dahlan, Imdadullah Muhajir Makki
- Influenced: Zakariyya Kandhlawi, Muhammad Ilyas Kandhalawi, Muhammad Yahya Kandhlawi, Muhammad Idris Kandhlawi

Khalil Ahmad Saharanpuri (Urdu: خلیل احمد سہارنپوری, romanized: Khalīl Aḥmad Sahāranpūrī; December 1852 – 13 October 1927) was an Indian Islamic scholar of the Deobandi movement. He authored Badhl Al-Majhud Fi Hall Abi Dawud, an 18-volume commentary on the hadith collection Sunan Abi Dawud. He was a Sunni of the Hanafi school. He was also a Sufi shaykh of the Chishti order, being a disciple and successor of Rashid Ahmad Gangohi.

== Name and family background ==
In one of his books he introduces himself as, "Ḥāfiz̤ Abū Ibrāhīm K͟halīl Aḥmad ibn Shāh Majīd ‘Alī ibn Shāh Aḥmad ‘Alī ibn Shāh Qut̤b ‘Alī." In the biographical work Nuzhat al-Khawatir it is written, "K͟halīl Aḥmad al-Anbeṭhawī as-Sahāranpūri: The Shaykh, the ‘Ālim, the Faqīh, K͟halīl Aḥmad ibn Majīd ‘Alī ibn Aḥmad ‘Alī ibn Qut̤b ‘Alī ibn G͟hulām Muḥammad al-Anṣārī al-Ḥanafī al-Anbeṭhawī, one of the righteous scholars and senior jurists and traditionists." (Note: The Urdu spellings of proper nouns have been preserved in Nuzhat al-Khawatir, and thus also in transliteration here.) In Mu‘jam al-Ma‘ājim wa-al-Mashyakhāt it is written, "The Shaykh, the Muḥaddith, the Faqīh, Khalīl Aḥmad ibn Majīd ‘Alī […] al-Anṣārī al-Ḥanafī al-Anbayt′hawī as-Sahāranfūri al-Muhājir al-Madanī, one of the senior scholars of India." Husain Ahmad Madani writes in the introduction to Badhl al-Majhud, "Mawlānā Abū Ibrāhīm Khalīl Aḥmad, al-Ayyūbī al-Anṣārī by lineage and origin, al-Ḥanafī ar-Rashīdī by mashrab (spiritual disposition, lit. 'spring') and madhhab (legal school), and al-Jishtī al-Qādirī an-Naqshbandī as-Suhrawardī by ṭarīqah (Sufi order) and maslak (track)."

== Biography ==
Khalil Ahmad was born in late Safar 1269 AH (early December 1852) in Nanauta, Saharanpur district, British India (in present-day Uttar Pradesh, India). He was named both "Zahiruddin" and "Khalil Ahmad", but the second name was what he became known by. The chronogram "Z̤ahīruddīn wa Aḥmad" (ظہیرالدین و احمد, "Zahiruddin and Ahmad") equates to the year of his birth, 1269, using Abjad numerals.

His mother Mubarak-un-Nisa was the daughter of Mamluk Ali Nanautawi and the sister of Muhammad Yaqub Nanautawi, who would later be sadr mudarris (head teacher) at Darul Uloom Deoband. On his father's side he was Ayyubi Ansari and on his mother's side he was Siddiqi.

=== Early education ===
Khalil Ahmad began his education at the age of five in a maktab (elementary school) with study of the qaidah, a common text for learning Arabic script. For barakah (blessing), his grandfather Mamluk Ali conducted the opening bismillah ceremony. In a short time completed nazirah (reading) of the Qur'an and then began studying Urdu. In Ambehta and Nanauta he completed hifz (memorization) of the Qur'an and study of the primary Urdu and Persian books under various teachers.

At the age of eleven, he began his Arabic studies in Gwalior with his paternal uncle Maulana Ansar Ali Saharanpuri, who served as Sadrus Sudur in Gwalior, head of the state's religious department. With Ansar Ali he studied the primary books of Arabic—Mizan as-Sarf, Sarf Mir, and Panj Ganj. After some time Khalil Ahmad's father, who was also employed in Gwalior, resigned from his work and returned to Ambehta with Khalil Ahmad. His education was assigned to Maulana Sakhawat Ali Ambehtawi, with whom he studied up to Kafiyah and its commentary Sharh Jami in Arabic grammar. Thereafter, in compliance with his father's wishes, he enrolled at the government English-medium school and commenced secular studies.

=== Higher studies ===
When Darul Uloom Deoband was opened in Muharram 1283 AH (May 1866) and Maulana Yaqub Nanautawi was appointed as sadr mudarris (the head teacher), Khalil Ahmad took permission from his parents and travelled to Deoband, where he resumed his Islamic studies from Kafiyah. Six months later Mazahir Uloom was established and Mazhar Nanautawi was appointed sadr mudarris. Due to the environment not suiting him at Deoband, he transferred to Mazahir Uloom Saharanpur and entered in the class of Mukhtasar al-Ma'ani.

At Mazahir Uloom he spent several years acquiring knowledge of subjects including fiqh, usul al-fiqh, hadith, and tafsir. Most books were taught by Maulana Mazhar Nanautawi and some by Maulana Ahmad Hasan Kanpuri. Studies in hadith were commenced in 1285 AH (1868) with Mishkat al-Masabih. Sahih al-Bukhari and Hidayah were among the books studied in 1286 AH (1869). In the annual examinations Khalil Ahmad was regularly among the students who received prizes for high marks. He received his sanad-i faraghat (graduate degree) in 1288 AH (1871) at the age of 19. That year he received a copy of Sahih al-Bukhari as a special prize from Maulana Ahmad Ali Saharanpuri.

Following his graduation, he was appointed as an assistant Arabic teacher at Mazahir Uloom. However he soon left for Lahore to pursue further studies in adab (Arabic literature) with Maulana Faizul Hasan Saharanpuri, head of the Arabic department at the Oriental College in Lahore. In a few months Khalil Ahmad studied books of adab from him including Maqamat and Mutanabbi.

== Bay'at ==
One day, Moulana Khalil's paternal uncle, Moulvi Ansar Ali said, "After your studies, you should acquire tasawwuf from Moulvi Saab (i.e. Gangohi)". At around this time, Moulana Khalil's marriage was conducted with a woman from Gangoh. Thus, he passed much of his time in Gangoh. While in Gangoh, Khalil remained in the blessed company of Gangohi. However, the thought of requesting Khalil for bay'at did not occur to him. However, after his graduation, the idea of bay'at did occur to him. Coincidentally, Moulana Muhammad Qasim Nanotvi arrived. At night, in privacy, Moulana Khalil said, "I have the thought of bay'at. In our surroundings, there are several buzurgs. I do not know what is best for me. If you feel that it is best for me to enter into the association of your khuddam, then do accept me. However, instruct me according to what you feel is best for me." In reply, Moulana explained that there was none better than Moulana Rashid Ahmad for this. Moulana Khalil then said, "He is extremely reluctant regarding bay'at. However, if you intercede on my behalf, then this matter will be finalised. He responded, "Good, when I come to Gangoh, be there." Thus, when he was informed that Moulana was travelling to Gangoh, Moulana Khalil immediately did the same. In the morning, after he had conversed with Gangohi, he called for Moulana Khalil. Moulana Khalil entered, greeted Gangohi, and sat down. Gangohi, with a slight smile, said, "Humble and lowly people become my murids. You are the son of a pir and selected one. Why do you wish for your bay'at to be accepted by me?" This statement incapacitated Khalil's senses and he stammered, "Hazrat, I am worse, more contemptible, and useless than them (the humble folk). Gangohi responded, "Enough! Enough! Make Istikhara. I am coming to the masjid". Moulana Khalil immediately proceeded to the masjid, performed wudhu, and performed Istikhara. When Gangohi arrived, he instructed Moulana Khalil to repent and initiated him into the System of Subjection thereafter.

== Career ==
In 1871, Khalil became a teacher at Mazahirul Uloom Saharanpur. His monthly salary was three rupees. However, soon after, he proceeded to Lahore to pursue further studies in Uloomul Adabiyya. He remained in Lahore for a few months. After studying Maqaamaat and Mutanabbi under Moulana Faidhul Hasan, he travelled to Deoband. Moulana Ya'qub arranged for him to be employed as the translator of Qaamus into Urdu. The monthly salary was ten rupees. He was sent to a mountainous terrain to execute this task and returned after approximately two months. Thereafter, he became the principal of Manglore's madrasa. At around this time, an offer of employment from Bhopal arrived for Maulana Ya'qub for a monthly salary of three hundred rupees, but he declined the offer. However, he was pressed to send another reliable person to occupy the post, so he decided to send Khalil. By the choice of his honourable uncle and on the approval of Gangohi, he departed in 1293 AH to occupy the post in Bhopal at a monthly salary of fifty rupees. However, due to his dislike of Bhopal and its atmosphere, Khalil resigned and requested permission to return. In accordance with the instructions of Moulana Gangohi, Khalil remained in Bhopal until the Hajj season. Khalil then departed from Bhopal with a few months of salary in advance.

After returning from his first Hajj, Khalil spent a few days in his hometown. Thereafter, he departed for Sikandrabad in the Bulandshahr district of Uttar Pradesh in Jumadul Awwal of 1294 AH, where he became a teacher at the Madrasa Arabiyya of the Jami’ Masjid. However, the people there vehemently opposed him. Thus, he sought permission from Gangohi to return. However, Gangohi refused. Despite Khalil's affection and affability, the intransigence of the people increased. Thus, later with the permission of Gangohi, Khalil resigned and returned. In 1295 AH, a letter from Moulvi Shamsuddin, Chief Justice of Bhawalpur, was sent to Moulana Muhammad Ya'qub. The letter was a request for a highly qualified teacher. Moulana Ya'qub selected Khalil for this post. Finally, upon the instructions of Moulana Ya'qub and Moulana Gangohi, Khalil accepted the post in Bhawalpur at a monthly salary of thirty rupees.

Thereafter, Khalil returned to Saharanpur and resumed his post as a teacher there. He soon progressed into a senior teacher and taught Tawdih Talwih, Hammaasa Rashidiyya, Sharhul Wiqaayah, Shara Nukhbatul Fikr, Mu'atta Imam Muhammad, and Siraji. The following year, together with several kitabs of various subjects, Khalil taught Sahih al-Bukhari, Sunan Abu Da'ud, Sunan al-Tirmidhi, and Sahih Muslim. Khalil, together with internal spiritual knowledge, also possessed external theoretical knowledge. He could lecture on any kitab with ease and possessed perfect methodology. Even Moulana Anwar Shah Kashmiri would visit Khalil for advice and guidance in his writings and discourses.

== Hajj pilgrimages ==
Khalil performed Hajj (the pilgrimage to Mecca) seven times.

The first time was in 1293 AH, while he was living in Bhopal.

Khalil's second Hajj was when he was living in Bhawalpur in Shawwaal of 1297 AH.

Khalil's third and all subsequent Hajj journeys were undertaken from Saharanpur. The third Hajj was after the death of Gangohi.

Khalil's fourth Hajj was in 1910.

Khalil's fifth Hajj was in Shawwal of 1332 AH in the company of Shaikhul Hind. In Mecca, on account of the oppression of Sharif Husain, Khalil had to return before the Hajj. He left Mecca at the end of Shawwal and his ship arrived in Bombay on 6 September 1916. As he left the ship, he, his wife, and his brother, Haji Maqbul Ahmad, who was his right-hand man, were arrested. All three of them were transported to Nanital with their luggage. They were released shortly afterwards.

Khalil's sixth Hajj occurred in 1920. He left Saharanpur on 21 April 1920 and reached Mecca on 29 May 1920. Khalil returned to Saharanpur in Safar of 1339 AH.

Khalil did not return to India after his seventh Hajj He left Saharanpur on 29 April 1926 and reached Mecca on 6 June 1926

== Final years and death ==
Towards the end Ramadaan, Khalil became affected with paralysis and moved about with difficulty. The paralysis had started after the completion of Badhlul Majhud, when he became ill. However, this illness disappeared with the dawn of Ramadaan. However, the illness reappeared two or three days before Eid ul-Fitr and then paralysis set in. At the end of Ramadaan, he experienced the effects of partial paralysis. Even on Eid al-Fitr, the effect of the paralysis was predominant to such an extent that he was unable to attend Salat al-Eid in the Haram. However, when he regained his strength, he limped to Al-Masjid an- Nabawi with a cane. In the month of Rabiul Akhir in 1346 AH, the severity of his illness intensified. His fever and paralysis increased. Sometimes, when the severity of his illness increased, he could not attend salah at the Al-Masjid an-Nabawi. However, when he felt somewhat better, he would go to Al-Masjid an-Nabawi with the support of a cane and the aid of one of his attendants. In the first week of Rabi ul Aakhir in 1346 AH, he experienced pain in his chest, which would disappear when he was massaged. In the second week, on the request of some of the 'Ulama of Medina, Khalil started to teach Sunan Abu Da'ud after Asr Salaah at the residence of Maulana Sayyid Ahmad. After conducting lessons for a weekend, while returning from Zuhr Salaah on Monday, Khalil complained of more pain in his chest. He added that he had felt a similar pain three or four days earlier, which disappeared within two or three hours after a massage. On reaching the house, he was massaged. At the time of Asr Salaah, although the pain had decreased, weakness did not permit him to attend salah in the Haram. Thus, he performed Asr Salaah at home behind Moulvi Sayyid Ahmad. Despite his weakness, he stood and performed his salah. His weakness increased and, instead of feeling feverish, he started to feel cold and perspired. He could not perform Maghrib Salaah while standing. Thus, he sat and requested Moulvi Sayyid Ahmad to perform the salah quickly. His condition deteriorated and he performed Isha Salah while seated on his bed. He passed the night in restlessness while constantly performing dhikr. He did not sleep at all. On Tuesday morning, Khalil performed Fajr Salah while seated on his bed. His perspiration and coldness continued to increase. Medicine was administered for a day. At the time of Dhuhr Salaah, Khalil was overcome with weakness to such an extent that he was unable to perform wudu. Thus, he performed tayammum and then performed salaah while seated on the bed. Thereafter, movement became difficult. By the time of Asr Salaah, his condition had further deteriorated. He performed Asr Salaah with much difficulty. By Maghrib Salaah, he no longer had any strength to lift himself. Besides Pas Anfas, which is a method of dhikr by breathing, Khalil was not able to do anything else. He did not respond to any conversation nor did he ask any questions. Twenty-four hours passed in complete silence and on Thursday, 13 October 1927, Khalil died as he repeatedly proclaimed "Allah!" aloud. Then, his eyes closed and he became silent.

== Funeral ==
Despite the small amount of time available, funeral arrangements were accomplished successfully. Sayyid Ahmad Tawwaab performed the ghusl while Abu Sa'ud poured the water. Moulvi Sayyid Ahmad and Moulvi Abdul Karim assisted. The Salat al-Janazah or his body was prepared for funeral, brought outside Al-Masjid an-Nabawi (mosque of Muhammad), and placed near Babul Jibra'il for Salat al-Janazah. After Maghrib Salaah, Maulana Shaikh Tayyib, the rector of Madrasa Shari'a, led the Salat al-Janazah. The funeral procession then proceeded to Jannat al-Baqi cemetery. Khalil was buried in his grave shortly before Isha prayer.

== Legacy ==
His biographical works include: Tazkiratul Khalil by Aashiq-e-Ilahi Mirathi.

== See also ==
- List of Deobandis
