= Mishkat al-Masabih =

Compilation of hadith by al-Khaṭīb at-Tibrīzī

- Author: Muḥammad ibn ʻAbd Allāh Khaṭīb al-Tibrīzī
- Original title: مشكاة المصابيح
- Language: Arabic
- Subject: Hadith
- Genre: Hadith collection

Mishkat al-Masabih (Arabic: مشكاة المصابيح, romanized: Mishkāt al-Maṣābīḥ, lit. 'Niche of Lanterns') by Walī ad-Dīn Abū ʿAbd Allāh Muḥammad ibn ʿAbd Allāh al-Khaṭīb at-Tibrīzī (d.1248) is an expanded and revised version of al-Baghawī's Maṣābīḥ as-Sunnah. Khaṭīb at-Tibrīzī rendered this version of the original text more accessible to those not having an advanced knowledge of the science of hadith.

== Description ==
It contains 5945 aḥādīth divided into 29 chapters and is considered to be an important collection of aḥādīth by Sunni Islamic scholars. An example of a hadith from Mishkat al-Masabih is as follows: "He is not a perfect believer, who goes to bed full and knows that his neighbour is hungry."

=== Differences from al-Baghawī's Maṣābīḥ as-Sunnah ===
Imām at-Tibrīzī added 1511 aḥādīth to the total of 4434 aḥādīth already in Maṣābīḥ as-Sunnah. Al-Baghawī classified many aḥādīth as authentic to which other scholars did not agree at times. At-Tibrīzī expounded on the classifications that al-Baghawī placed on the aḥādīth and re-classified many of them. He also added a third section to Masabih al-Sunnah, which was already divided in two parts by al-Baghawī. This section consisted of narrations that he felt fit into the chapter and provided further clarification. Al-Baghawī did not mention the isnad of the aḥādīth he collected whereas at-Tibrīzī mentions the source from which the aḥādīth can originally be found - making the text more reliable.

== Commentaries ==
Many commentaries on the book have been written and published worldwide.

- Al-Taleeq al-Sabeeh ala Mishkat al-Masabih by Idris Kandhlawi
- Commentary of Husayn ibn `Abd Allah ibn Muhammad al-Tibi
- Mirqat al Mafatih Sharh Mishkat al-masabih is a multi-volume work, authored by 17th century Islamic scholar Mulla Ali al-Qari
- Mirat ul Manajih Sharh Mishkat al-Masabih is an Urdu explanation authored by Mufti Ahmed Yaar Khan Naeemi
- Midrajul Fawatih Sharh Miskhat al-Masabih authored in Bahasa Malaysia by Maulana Hasnul Hizam Hamzah
- Al-Kawkab al-Durri fi Sharh Muqaddimah Mishkat al-Masabih, authored by Maulana Momtazuddin Ahmad

== See also ==
- List of Sunni books
- Kutub al-Sittah
- Sahih Muslim
- Sunan Abu Dawood
- Sahih al-Tirmidhi
- Sunan ibn Majah
- Muwatta Malik
- Riyad as-Salihin
