= Mazahir Uloom =

Islamic seminary in India

Coordinates: 29°58′42.27″N 77°32′48.17″E

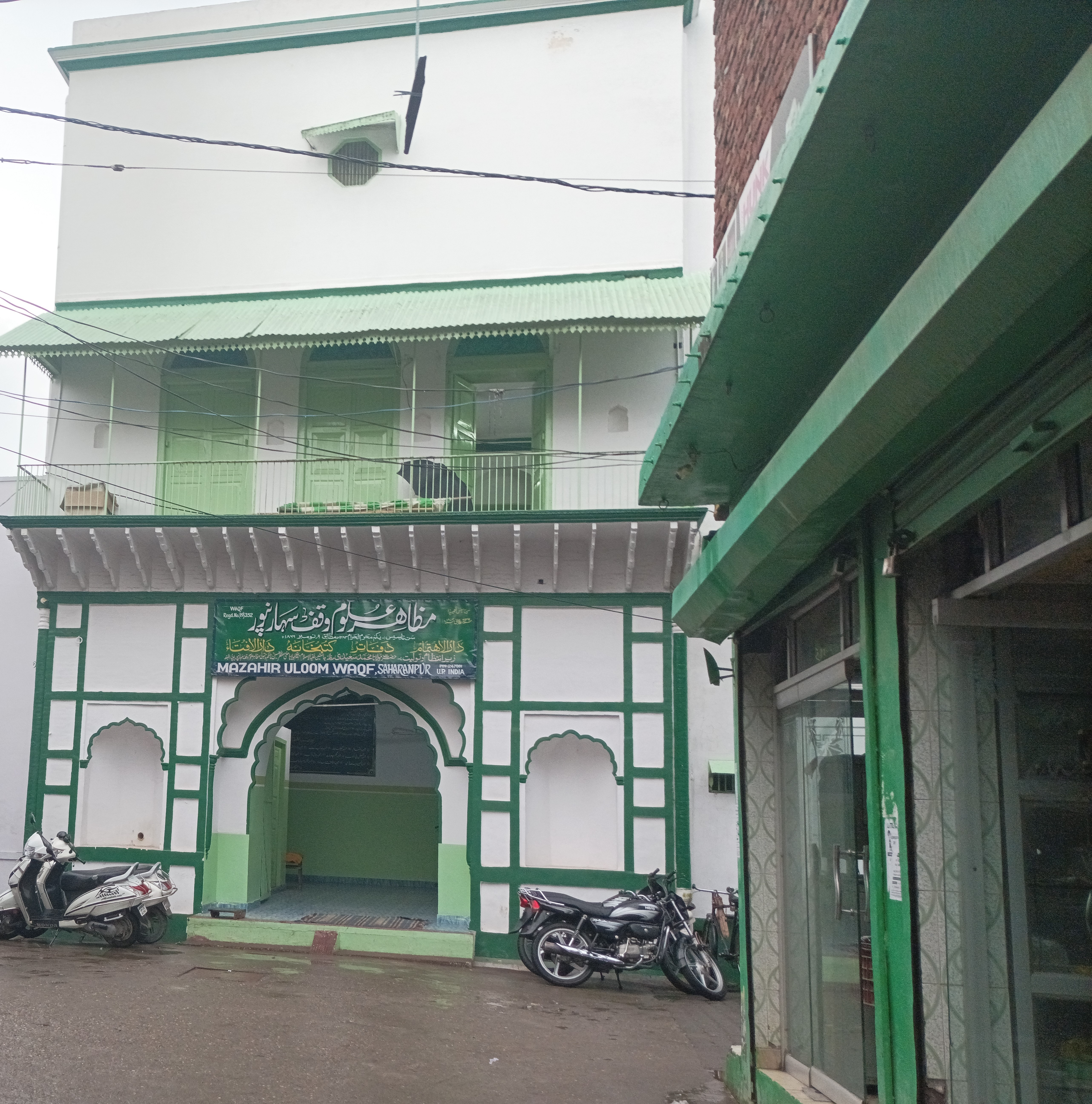
- Entry gate of the office of seminary
- Type: Islamic seminary
- Established: 9 November 1866 (159 years ago)
- Founders: Ahmad Ali Saharanpuri; Saadat Ali Saharanpuri; Mazhar Nanautawi
- Rector: Mufti Badran Saeedi(acting)
- Location: Saharanpur, India
- Nickname: Mazahir Uloom Qadeem
- Website: mazahiruloom.org

Mazahir Uloom (also known as Mazahir Uloom Waqf Qadeem) is an Islamic seminary located in Saharanpur, Uttar Pradesh. Started in November 1866 by Saadat Ali Faqih, and developed further by Mazhar Nanautawi and Ahmad Ali Saharanpuri; it is regarded as the second most influential and major Deobandi seminary in India. The earliest graduates of the seminary include famous Hadīth scholar Khalil Ahmad Saharanpuri. In 1988, the seminary split into two with the establishment of Mazahir Uloom Jadeed as a new independent seminary. Since then the seminary has been named as Mazahir Uloom Waqf Qadeem.

Sa'ādat Ali Saharanpuri served as the seminary's first rector. Islam-ul-Haq As'adi was appointed as the acting rector after Muhammad Saeedi's death on 4 June 2025.

== History ==
Mazāhir Uloom was established as "Mazhar Uloom"; on 9 November 1866, six months after the foundation of the Deoband seminary. Its founding figures included Ahmad Ali Saharanpuri, Mazhar Nanautawi, Qādhi Fazlur Rahmān and Sa’adat Ali Faqih. Mazahir Uloom is thought to be the second major madrasa after Darul Uloom Deoband.

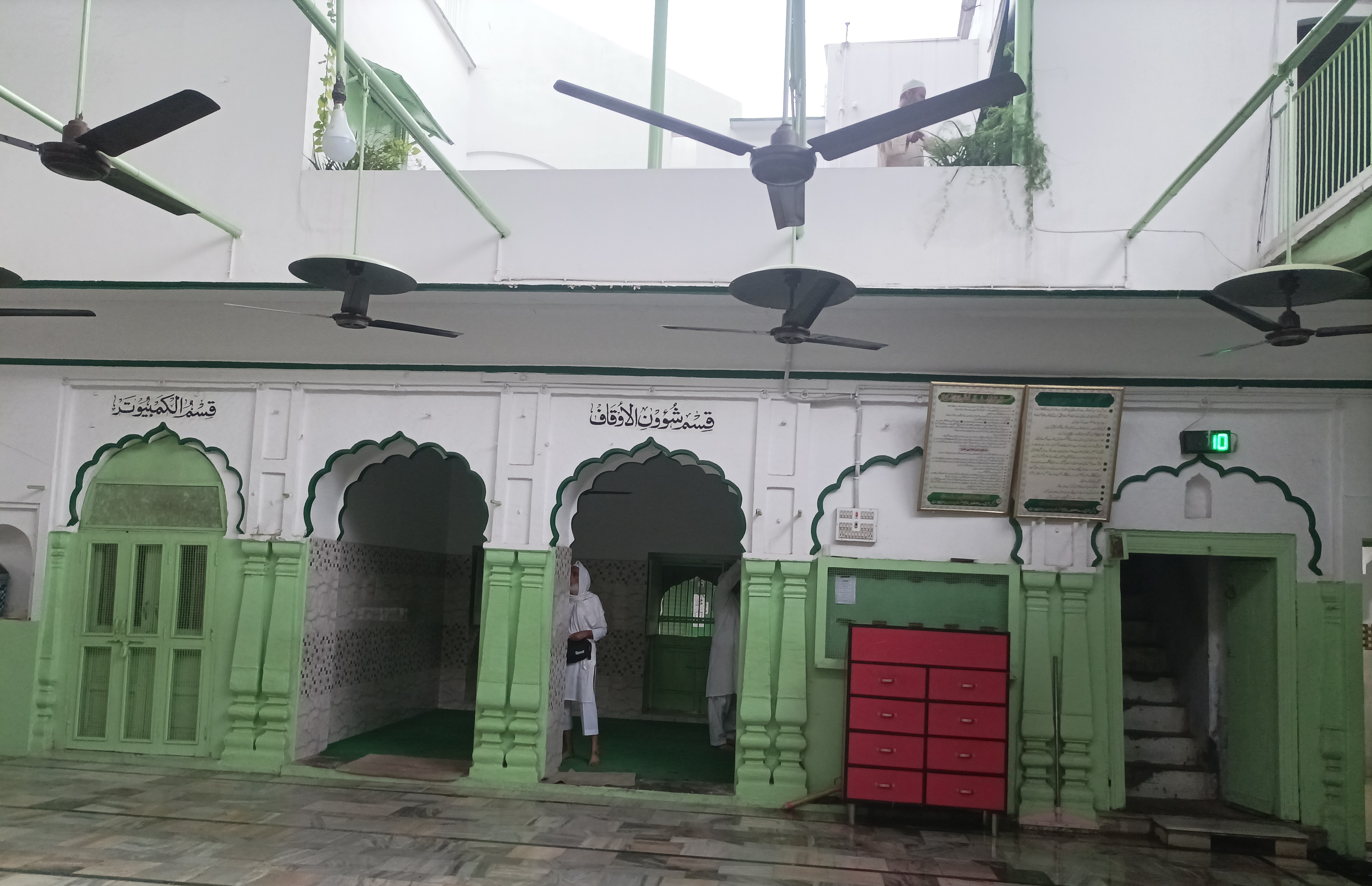
One of the earliest buildings of Mazahir Uloom

The first generation teachers, apart from the founders; include, Aḥmad Hasan Kanpuri, Sa'adat Hussain Bihari, Sakhāwat Ali Ambethwi and Muḥammad Siddīq. The first generation students include Khalil Ahmad Saharanpuri, Mushtāq Aḥmad Anbethwi and Qamruddīn Sahāranpuri. In Muharram 1338 AH, the seminary established its Darul Ifta (the fatwa institute). The seminary's jurists include Ashfāqur Rahmān Kāndhlawi, Mahmood Hasan Gangohi, Abdul Qayyūm Raipuri and Muḥammad Shuaib Bastawi.

=== Recent developments ===
Following the split of Darul Uloom Deoband in 1982; this seminary also bifurcated into two and Mazahir Uloom Jadeed took birth as an independent offshoot in 1988.

== Program ==
The seminary teaches the Dars-e-Nizami curriculum. The former rector of the seminary Abdul Latīf wrote a detailed defense of the Dars-e-Nizami curriculum; when some scholars asked the syllabus to be updated. The seminary has changed few books in the curriculum timely, but they did not modify it completely and they do not agree with the changes, or systems otherwise.

== Administration ==
Mazāhir Uloom follows the dogma of Sunni Islam and the jurisprudence of Abu Hanifa. It adheres to the Chishti order of Sufism, following Rashid Ahmad Gangohi and Khalil Ahmad Saharanpuri. The seminary focuses on educational purposes only. It has stayed away from discussing politics.

The management of the seminary was controlled by its local members. Owing to their differences, Rashid Ahmad Gangohi was appointed the senior patron of the seminary in 1896. Gangohi resigned from the position in 1319 AH; and an executive council called "Majlis Shūra Sarparastān" was formed to look after the seminary affairs on 3 January 1903. The first such council included Abdur Rahīm Raipuri, Ashraf Ali Thanwi and Zulfiqar Ali Deobandi.

Scholars such as Abdur Rahim Raipuri, Ashraf Ali Thanwi, Mahmud Hasan Deobandi, Fazlur Rahmān Sahāranpuri, Khalil Ahmad Saharanpuri, Abdul Qadir Raipuri, Aashiq Elahi Meerthi, Muhammad Ilyas Kandhlawi, Zakariyya Kandhlawi, Muhammad Yusuf Kandhlawi, Inamul Hasan Kandhlawi, Iftikhar-ul-Hasan Kandhlawi, Mahmood Hasan Gangohi and Ghulam Mohammad Vastanvi have been the members of the executive council.

== Publications ==
Mazahir Uloom publishes Ā'īna-e-Mazāhir-e-Uloom as a monthly journal. The religious edicts issued by the seminary's Dārul Ifta are kept in record. The edicts issued by Khalil Ahmad Saharanpuri were compiled by Muhammad Zakariyyah Kāndhlawi, and published as Fatāwa Khalīliya.

== Rectors ==
Sa'ādat Ali Saharanpuri was appointed as the first rector of the seminary. Following the division and establishment of Mazahir Uloom Jadeed; Muzaffar Hussain who was the last rector of the unified seminary; occupied on the position at the Mazahir Uloom till his death in 2003. He was succeeded by Muḥammad Saeedi. In the early years of the seminary, the administrative tasks of the seminary were also performed by a vice-rector; Abd al-Wāhid Khān served on the position from 1881 to 1896, and thus there appears to be confusion in dates, until a permanent position of rector was adopted which follows in sequence after Munshi Maqbool Aḥmad.

The following is a list of seminary's rectors.

Number	Name	Term start	Term end
1	Sa'ādat Ali Sahāranpuri	1866	1870
2	Fazlur Rahmān Sahāranpuri	1866	1908
3	Ali Muḥammad	1896	1907
4	Ikrāmul-Haq	1907	1908
5	Munshi Maqbool Aḥmad	1910	1916
6	Munshi Fazl Haq	1917	1918
7	Bashīr Ḥasan Nagīnwi	1919	1920
8	Khalil Ahmad Saharanpuri	1920	1925
9	Ināyat Ilāhi	1925	1928
10	Abdul Lateef Poor Qazvi	1925	1954
11	Muḥammad Asadullah	1954	1979
12	Muzaffar Hussain	1980	2003
13	Muhammad Saeedi	2003	4 June 2025
14	Mufti Badran Saeedi (Acting)	June 2025	present

== Notable alumni ==
Alumni include:

- Khalil Ahmad Saharanpuri
- Mahmood Hasan Gangohi
- Zakariyya Kandhlawi
- Saeed Ahmad Palanpuri
- Zafar Ahmad Usmani
- Badre Alam Merathi

== Bibliography ==
- Mazahiri, Nasiruddin (July 2025). Nadwi, Wasi Sulaiman (ed.). "حضرت مولانا محمد سعیدی مظاہری". Armughan. 33 (7). Armughan Muzaffarnagar: 22–27.
- Saharanpuri, Shahid (2005). Ulama e Mazahir Uloom aur unki Ilmi wa tasnīfi khidmāt (in Urdu). Vol. 1 (2nd ed.). Saharanpur: Maktaba Yādgār-e-Shaykh.
- Qasmi, Nayab Hasan (2013). Darul Uloom Deoband Ka Sahafati Manzarnama (in Urdu). pp. 347–348.
