= Saharanpur =

- City
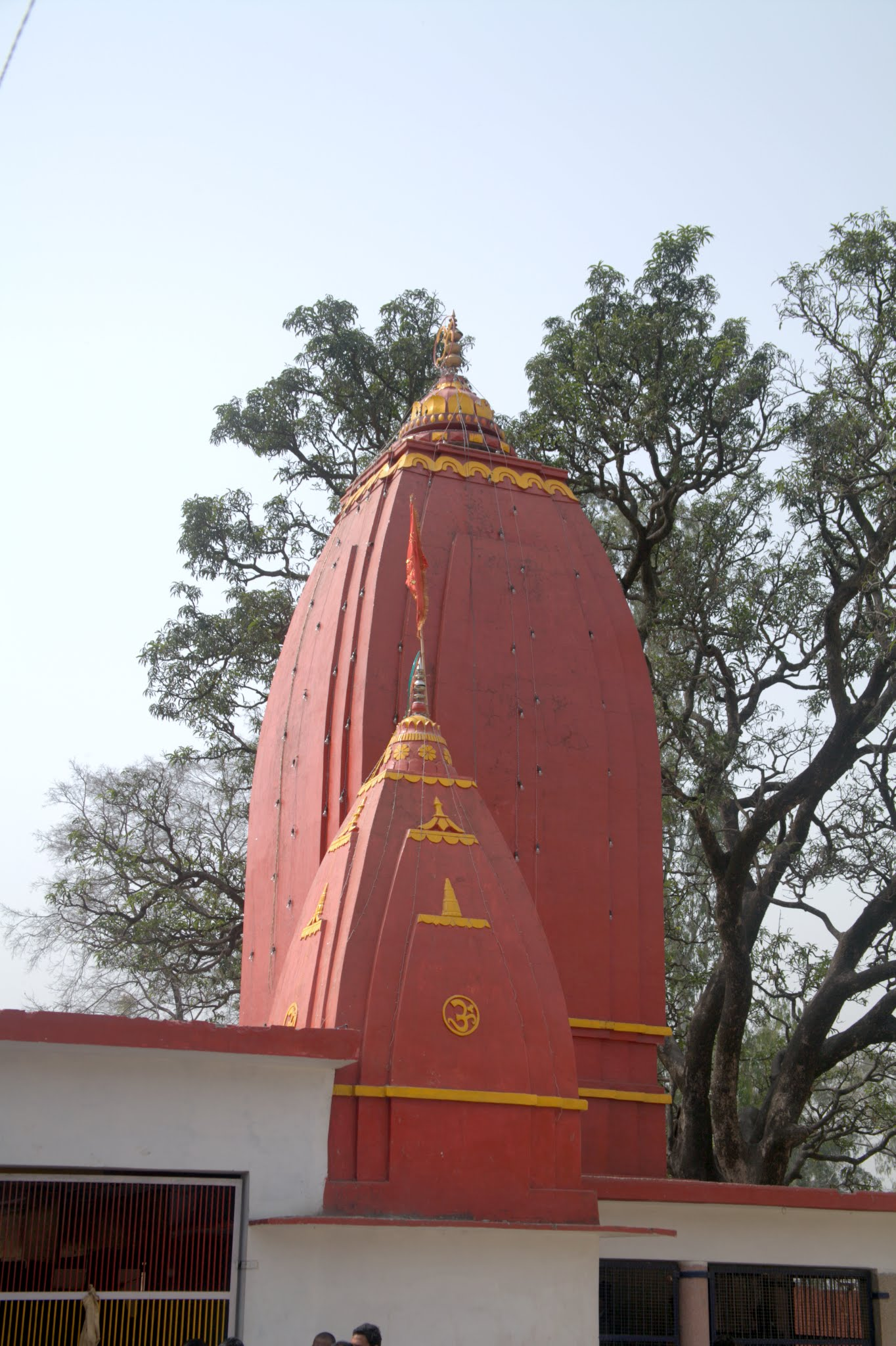
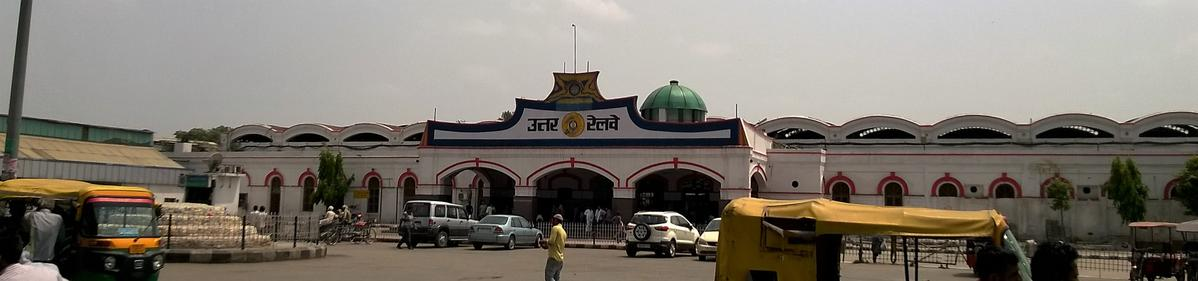
- Shakumbari Devi Temple Saharanpur Junction railway station

- Location in Uttar Pradesh, India Saharanpur (India)
- Coordinates: 29°57′50″N 77°32′45″E
- Country: India
- State: Uttar Pradesh
- District: Saharanpur

Government
  - Type: Municipal Corporation
  - Body: Saharanpur Municipal Corporation
  - Mayor: Ajay Kumar Singh (BJP)
  - Lok Sabha MP: Imran Masood (INC)

Population (2011)
  - Total: 705,478

Languages
  - Official: Hindi
  - Native: Khariboli
- Time zone: UTC+5:30 (IST)
- PIN: 247001/02
- Telephone code: 0132
- Vehicle registration: UP-11
- Airport: Sarsawa Airport
- Sex ratio: 1000/898 ♂/♀
- Website: saharanpur.nic.in

Saharanpur is a city and a municipal corporation in Uttar Pradesh, India. It is also the administrative headquarters of Saharanpur district.

Saharanpur city's name was given after the Saint Shah Haroon Chishti.

Saharanpur is declared as one among the 100 Smart Cities by the Ministry of Housing and Urban Affairs as a part of Smart Cities Mission of the Government of India.

== Historical ==
=== Medieval period ===
During the reign of Iltutmish (r 1211–1236), the region became a part of the Delhi Sultanate. At that time, most of the area remained covered with forests and marshlands, through which the Paondhoi, Dhamola, and Ganda Nala rivers flowed. The climate was humid and malaria outbreaks were common. Muhammad bin Tughluq, the Sultan of Delhi (1325–1351), undertook a campaign in the northern doab to crush the rebellion of the Shivalik kings in 1340, when according to local tradition he learned of the presence of a sufi saint on the banks of the Paondhoi River. After visiting the sage, he ordered that henceforth this region would be known as 'Shah-Haroonpur', after the Sufi Saint Shah Haroon Chishti. The simple but well-preserved tomb of this saint is situated in the oldest quarter of Saharanpur city, between the Mali Gate/Bazar Dinanath and Halwai Hatta. By the end of the 14th century, the power of the Sultanate had declined and it was attacked by Timur the Lame (1336–1405) of Central Asia. Timur had marched through the Saharanpur region in 1399 to sack Delhi and people of the region fought his army unsuccessfully. A weakened Sultanate was later conquered by the Central Asian Mogul king Babur (1483–1531).

=== Mughal period ===
In the 16th century, Babur, a Timurid descendant of Timur and Genghis Khan from Fergana Valley (modern-day Uzbekistan), invaded across the Khyber Pass and founded the Mughal Empire, covering India, along with modern-day Afghanistan, Pakistan and Bangladesh The Mughals were descended from Persianised Central Asian Turks (with significant Mongol admixture).

During the Mughal period, Akbar (1542–1605), Saharanpur became an administrative unit under the Province of Delhi. Akbar bestowed the feudal jagir of Saharanpur to the Raja Sah Ranveer Singh, an Aggarwal Jain who laid the foundations of the present-day city on the site of an army cantonment. The nearest settlements at that time were Shekhpura and Malhipur. Saharanpur was a walled city, with four gates: the Sarai Gate, the Mali Gate, the Buria Gate, and the Lakhi Gate. The city was divided into the neighbourhoods named Nakhasa Bazar, Shah Behlol, Rani Bazar and Lakhi Gate. The ruins of Shah Ran Veer Singh's old fort can still be seen in the Chaudharian locality of Saharanpur, not far from the better known 'Bada-Imam-bada'. He also built a large Jain temple in Muhallah/Toli Chaundhariyan, it is now known as the 'Digamber-Jain Panchayati Mandir'.

=== The Sayyids and Rohillas ===
Mughal emperors Akbar and later Shah Jahan (1592–1666) bestowed the administrative pargana of Sarwat on Muslim Sayyid families. In 1633, one of them founded a city and named it and the surrounding region Muzaffarnagar, in honour of his father, Sayyid Muzaffar Ali Khan. The Sayyids ruled the area until the 1739 invasion by Nadir Shah. After his departure, anarchy prevailed across the entire doab with the region ruled in succession by Jats. Taking advantage of this anarchy, the Rohillas took control of the entire trans-Gangetic region.

Ahmad Shah Durrani, the Afghan ruler who invaded Northwestern and Northern India in the 1750s, conferred the territory of Saharanpur as Jagir on Rohilla chief Najaf Khan, who assumed the title of Nawab Najeeb-ud-Daula and took up residence in Saharanpur in 1754. He made Gaunsgarh his capital and tried to strengthen his position against Maratha Empire attacks by entering an alliance with the Hindu Gurjar chieftain Manohar Singh. In 1759, Najeeb-ud-Daula issued a Deed of Agreement handing over 550 villages to Manohar Singh, who became the Raja of Landaura.

=== Maratha period ===
In 1757, the Maratha army captured the Saharanpur region, which resulted in Najeeb-ud-Daula losing control of Saharanpur to the Maratha rulers Raghunath Rao and Malharao Holkar. The conflict between Rohillas and Marathas came to an end on 18 December 1788 with the arrest of Ghulam Qadir, the grandson of Najeeb-ud-Daula, who was defeated by the Maratha general Mahadaji Scindia. The most significant contribution of Nawab Ghulam Qadir to Saharanpur city is the Nawab Ganj area and the Ahmedabadi fortress therein, which still stands. The death of Ghulam Qadir put an end to the Rohilla administration in Saharanpur and it became the northernmost district of the Maratha Empire. Ghani Bahadur Banda was appointed its first Maratha governor. The Maratha Regime saw the construction of the Bhuteshwar Temple and Bagheshwar Temple in Saharanpur city. In 1803, following the Second Anglo-Maratha War, when the East India Company defeated the Maratha Empire, Saharanpur came under British rule.

=== British colonial period (1803–1947 AD) ===
The East India Company added Saharanpur to its Bengal Presidency, and it was later transferred to the United Provinces of Agra and Oudh.

Saharanpur was the home of the first armed rebellion against British rule in what is now Uttar Pradesh. In 1813, there was mass revolt by the Hindu Gujjars of Saharanpur against British rule, but it was quickly suppressed. In 1824. Raja Kunja Singh, formerly the taluqdar of Kunja near Roorkee, led an armed revolt against East India Company rule and established a quasi-independent state; however, after a fierce battle the rebellion was quashed. The East India Company latef found that the Gujjars of the surrounding districts were about to come to the aid of Kunja Singh, but by then he had been defeated.

When in 1857 much of British India rebelled against the foreign Company's occupation, now referred to as the Indian Rebellion of 1857 or the First War of Indian Independence, the Saharanpur and the present-day Muzaffarnagar Districts were part of that uprising. The centre of freedom fighters' operations was Shamli, a small town in the Muzaffarnagar region which was liberated for some time. After the uprising failed, British retribution was severe. Death and destruction was particularly directed against the Muslims of the region, whom the British considered as the main instigators of the rebellion, even though Hindu Gurjars were the ones who had led the revolt. When social reconstruction started, the cultural and political history of Muslims began to revolve around Deoband and Aligarh. Muhammad Qasim Nanautawi and Rashid Ahmad Gangohi, both proponents of the reformer Shah Waliullah's ideology for social and political rejuvenation, established a school in Deoband in 1867. It found popularity and global recognition as the Darul Uloom Deoband. Its founders' mission was twofold: to raise and spread a team of scholars able to awaken the religious and social consciousness of Muslims through peaceful methods and to make efforts, through them, to educate Muslims in their faith and culture; and to bring about a feeling of nationalism and national unity by promoting the concept of Hindu-Muslim unity and a united India. Muslim scholars in the city of Saharanpur were active supporters of this ideology and went on to establish the Mazahir Uloom theological seminary six months later.

== Geography and climate ==
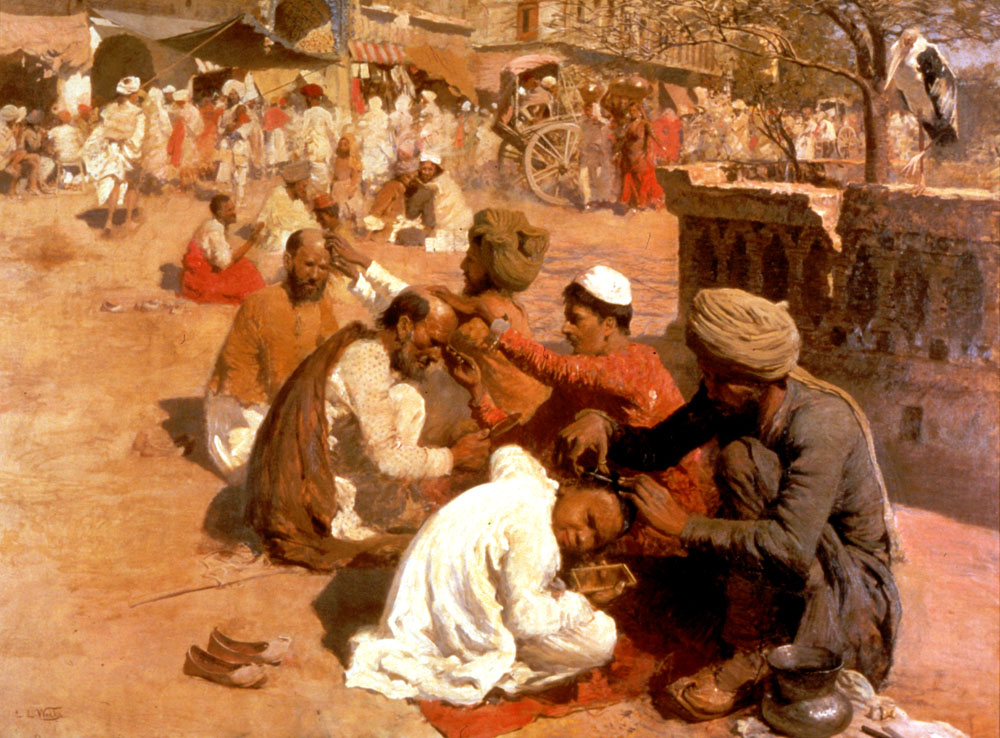
Barbers in Saharanpur, a painting by Edwin Lord Weeks (1849–1903)

Saharanpur is located at 29.97°N 77.55°E, about 130 kilometres (81 mi) south-southeast of Chandigarh, 170 kilometres (110 mi) north-northeast of Delhi, 65 kilometres (40 mi) north-northeast of Shamli and about 61 kilometres (38 mi) south-west of Dehradun. It has an average elevation of 291 metres (955 ft). Saharanpur is a part of a geographical doab region. Saharanpur district joins four states together Himachal Pradesh, Uttar Pradesh, Uttarakhand and Haryana.

Climate data for Saharanpur, Uttar Pradesh
| Month | Jan | Feb | Mar | Apr | May | Jun | Jul | Aug | Sep | Oct | Nov | Dec | Year |
|---|---|---|---|---|---|---|---|---|---|---|---|---|---|
| Mean daily maximum °C (°F) | 20 (68) | 22 (72) | 28 (82) | 35 (95) | 38 (100) | 37 (99) | 33 (91) | 32 (90) | 32 (90) | 31 (88) | 26 (79) | 21 (70) | 30 (85) |
| Mean daily minimum °C (°F) | 6 (43) | 8 (46) | 12 (54) | 18 (64) | 23 (73) | 26 (79) | 25 (77) | 25 (77) | 22 (72) | 16 (61) | 10 (50) | 6 (43) | 16 (62) |
| Average precipitation mm (inches) | 30 (1.2) | 40 (1.6) | 20 (0.8) | 10 (0.4) | 10 (0.4) | 70 (2.8) | 240 (9.4) | 200 (7.9) | 120 (4.7) | 20 (0.8) | 0 (0) | 10 (0.4) | 830 (32.7) |
| Average precipitation days | 1.7 | 1.5 | 1.5 | 1.1 | 1.4 | 2.8 | 7.5 | 7.6 | 2.7 | 1.0 | 0.6 | 0.9 | 30.3 |
Source: Weatherbase

== Demographics ==
Historical population
| Year | Pop. | ±% |
|---|---|---|
| 1901 | 66,254 | — |
| 1911 | 62,850 | −5.1% |
| 1921 | 62,261 | −0.9% |
| 1931 | 78,665 | +26.3% |
| 1941 | 105,622 | +34.3% |
| 1951 | 148,435 | +40.5% |
| 1961 | 185,213 | +24.8% |
| 1971 | 225,396 | +21.7% |
| 1981 | 295,355 | +31.0% |
| 1991 | 374,945 | +26.9% |
| 2001 | 455,754 | +21.6% |
| 2011 | 705,478 | +54.8% |

According to the 2011 Indian census, Saharanpur had a population of 705,478, 12.5% of whom were under the age of six, living in 129,856 households within the municipal corporation limits. The city is spread over an area of 46.74 km^{2} (18.05 sq mi) and with a population density of 15,093.67/km^{2} (39,092.4/sq mi), is the eleventh most populous city in Uttar Pradesh. Saharanpur had a population of 455,754 in 2001 and 374,945 in 1991.

Males constitute of 52.7% of the total population while females constitute of 47.3% of the total population and thus, the city has a sex ratio of 891 females for every 1,000 males. The city has an average literacy rate of 76.32%. Scheduled Castes and Scheduled Tribes account for 14.2% and 0.1% of the population respectively. There are 233,196 people, constituting about 33% of the total population, who live in slums in the city.

Religions in Saharanpur City (2011)
| Religion | Percent |
| Hinduism | 50.92% |
| Islam | 45.89% |
| Sikhism | 1.23% |
| Jainism | 1.03% |
| Other or not stated | 0.45% |

Roughly half of the city's population are Hindus, who form a slight majority, while Muslims constitute about 45 per cent of the total population. Sikhs and Jains are also present in smaller numbers.

Languages in Saharanpur town (2011)
1. Hindi (71.2%)
2. Urdu (27.1%)
3. Khari Boli (1.23%)
4. Others (0.46%)

The most widely spoken language in Saharanpur is Hindi, which along with Urdu is the official language of Uttar Pradesh. There are significant numbers of Urdu and Punjabi speakers, while Haryanvi is also spoken, as the district shares a border with Haryana. The standard dialect of Hindi spoken is the Khari Boli dialect.

== Government and politics ==
Saharanpur city is governed by Saharanpur Municipal Corporation, erstwhile municipal council. The city is divided into 4 zones and 70 wards, represented by 70 councillors who were elected by municipal or local elections in 2023. The mayor of the city is Ajay Kumar of the Bharatiya Janata Party. The municipal commissioner is Shipu Giri.

The city is also part of the Saharanpur Lok Sabha constituency, which elected Imran Masood from the Indian National Congress in 2024 as the Member of Parliament, and part of the Saharanpur Assembly constituency that elected Ashu Malik from the Samajwadi Party in 2022 as the MLA.

=== Civic utilities ===
There is only one sewage treatment plant located in Saharanpur, while most of the waste water is discharged into the Hindon river, further polluting it.

== Culture ==
=== Places of interest ===
==== Company Garden ====
The Saharanpur Botanical Gardens, known as the Company Garden and once the preserve of British East India Company, is one of the oldest existing gardens in India, dating to before 1750. Then named Farahat-Bakhsh, it was originally a pleasure ground set out by a local chief, Intazam ud-ullah. In 1817, it was acquired by the British East India Company and placed under the authority of the District Surgeon. Joseph Dalton Hooker says of this Botanical Garden that "Amongst its greatest triumphs may be considered the introduction of the tea-plant from China, a fact I allude to, as many of my English readers may not be aware that the establishment of the tea-trade in the Himalaya and Assam is almost entirely the work of the superintendents of the gardens of Calcutta and Seharunpore."

In 1887, when the Botanical Survey of India was set up to reform the country's botanical sciences, Saharanpur became the centre for the survey of the northern Indian flora. The Garden is seen historically as being second only to the Calcutta Gardens for its contribution to science and economy in India. Under private auspices today, it is full of greenery and has many different kinds of plants and flowers.

==== Shakumbari Devi Temple ====
Siddhpeeth Shri Shakumbhari Devi Temple is an important and ancient Hindu temple. It is situated in the Shivalik hills in Behat tehsil, 40 km from Saharanpur in Uttar Pradesh. It is one of the most visited pilgrimage centres in India. Every year lakhs of visitors visit the temple. Shakumbhari devi is a famous Shakta pitha (shrine) of maa Durga.

==== Wood Carving City ====
Saharanpur has been nicknamed the "Wood Carving City" for its hand-carved wooden artefacts.

==== Archaeological site Hulas ====
Situated about 40 km south of Saharanpur is an archaeological site yielding evidence of late Harappan settlement dating back to 2000 BC. It is one of the few significant Harappan sites in Western Uttar Pradesh besides Alamgirpur (Meerut district) and Bargaon (also in Saharanpur district).

== Transport ==
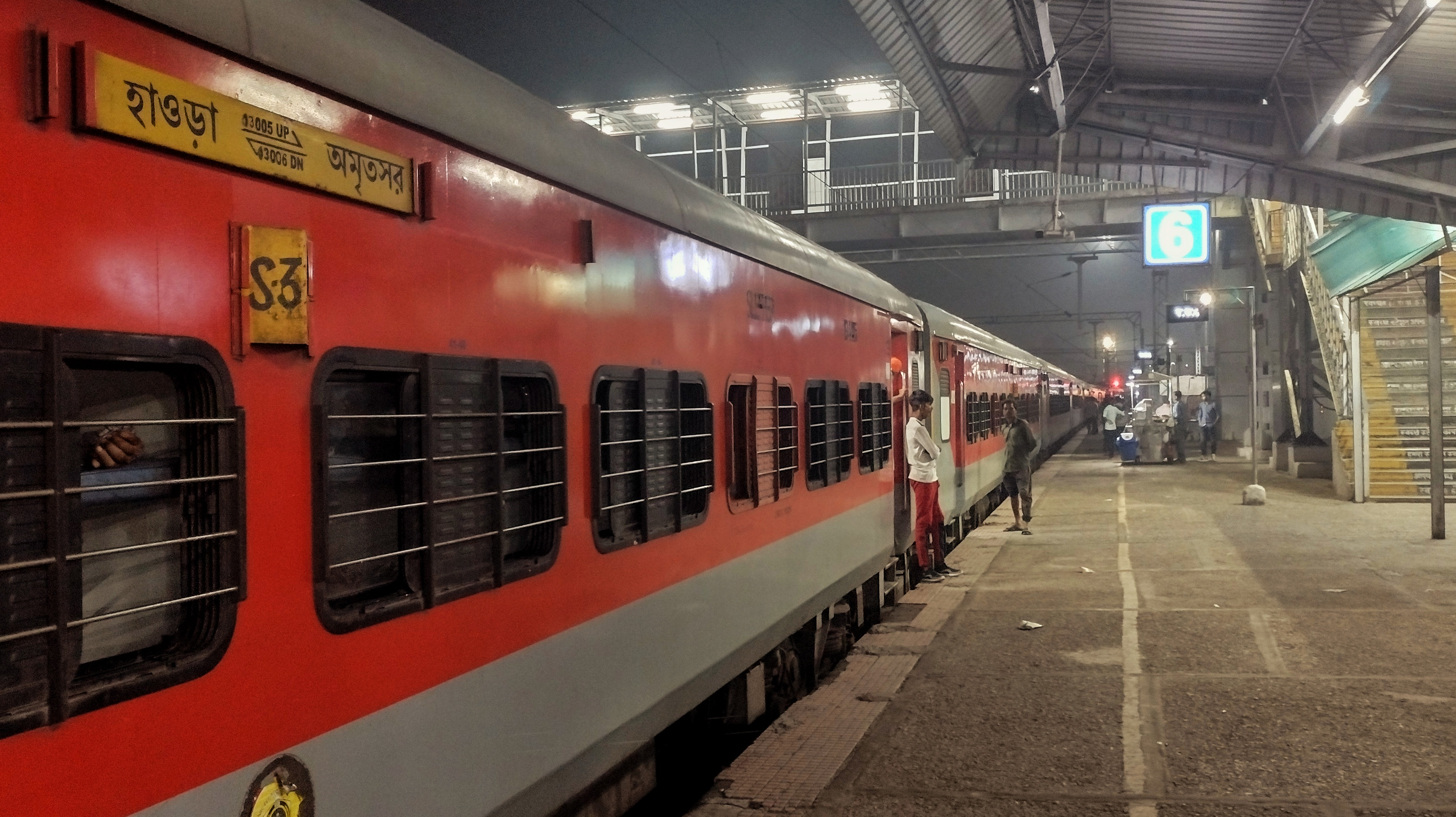
A train passing through Saharanpur Railway Station

Two major National Highways pass through Saharanpur – NH 709B and NH 344. The NH 709B originates in Saharanpur and connects it to Delhi via Shamli and Baghpat, while the NH 344 connects Saharanpur with Ambala, Yamunanagar and Roorkee and further connected to Panchkula in Haryana and Haridwar and Dehradun in Uttarakhand. Uttar Pradesh State Highway 57, commonly known as Delhi-Yamunotri highway, also passes through the city. The Delhi–Saharanpur–Dehradun Expressway has also been proposed, which will be ready by March 2024. Shamli- Ambala six lane expressway which is expected to be completed by 2025 will connect Gangoh Block of the district directly to Ambala.

Saharanpur Junction is the primary railway station serving the city. The station is under the administrative control of Ambala railway division of the Northern Railways, and is located at the junction of Moradabad–Ambala line, Delhi–Meerut–Saharanpur line and the Delhi–Shamli–Saharanpur line. Saharanpur was connected with rail lines when the Scinde, Punjab & Delhi Railway completed the 483-kilometre-long (300 mi) Amritsar–Ambala–Saharanpur–Ghaziabad line in 1870 connecting Multan (now in Pakistan) with Delhi. Another line connecting Saharanpur with Moradabad was completed in 1886.

The Shahdara–Saharanpur light railway connecting Shahdara in Delhi with Saharanpur was opened to traffic in 1907. The railway was built in 2 ft 6 in (762 mm) narrow gauge and total length was 94.24 miles (151.66 km). However, due to increasing losses, the railway was closed in 1970. It was later converted to 1,676 mm (5 ft 6 in) broad gauge and was reopened in the late 1970s. Saharanpur falls on the route of the proposed 1,839-kilometre (1,143 mi) Eastern Dedicated Freight Corridor project.

== See also ==
- Saharanpuri
- Saharanpur district
- Saharanpur (Lok Sabha constituency)
