= Mubarakpuri (surname) =

Mubarakpuri is a surname of origin from Mubarakpur, Azamgarh. Notable people with the surname include:

- Abdur-Rahman Mubarakpuri, Islamic scholar
- Arif Jameel Mubarakpuri (born 1971), Indian Islamic scholar
- Safi al-Rahman al-Mubarakpuri (1942–2006), Indian Islamic scholar
- Shukrullah Mubarakpuri (1895/1896 – 1942), British India Islamic scholar
- Qazi Athar Mubarakpuri (1916–1996), Indian Islamic scholar

== See also ==
- Mubarakpur (disambiguation)
