= Bibliography of Darul Uloom Deoband =

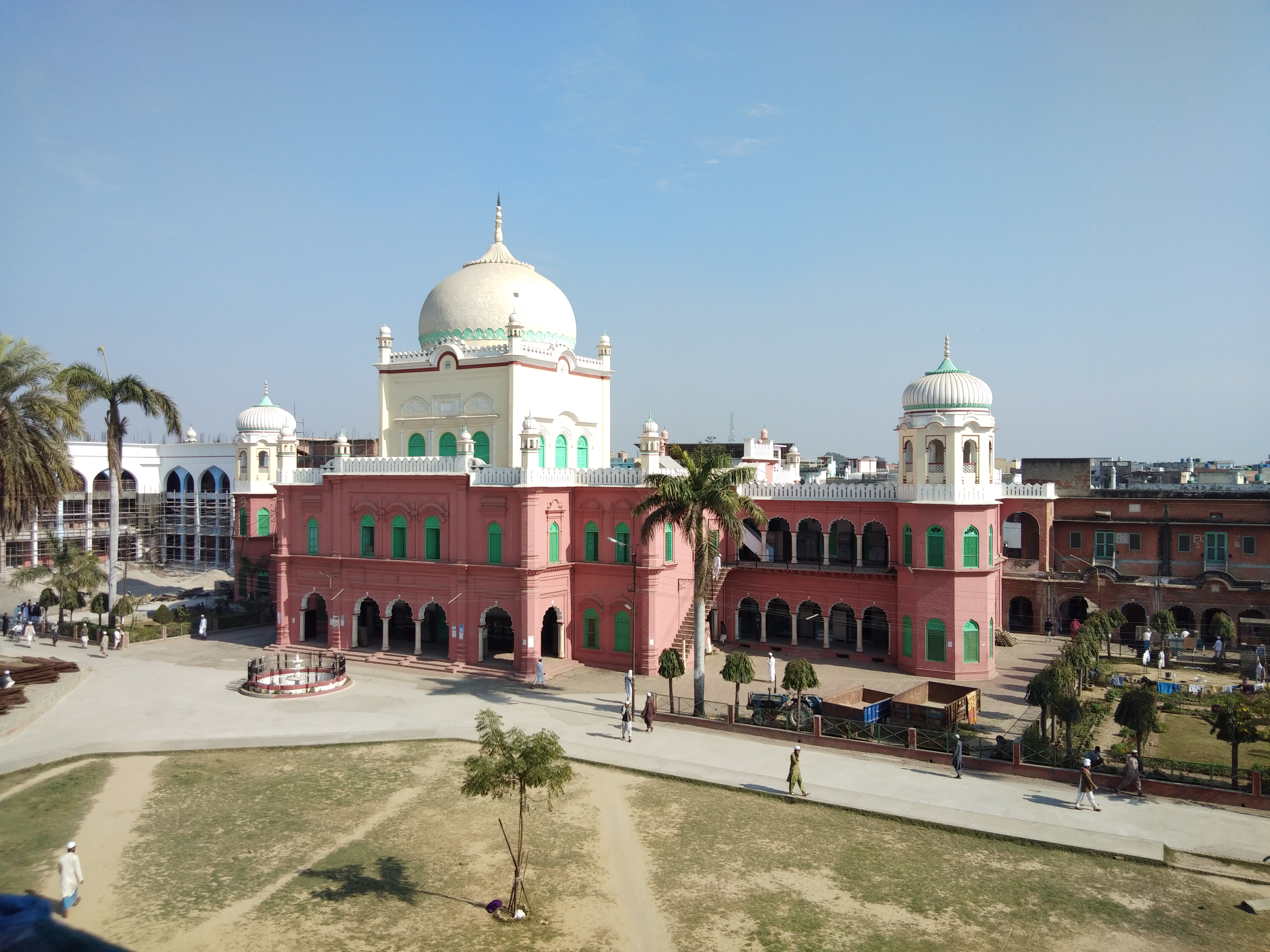
- Deoband in 2018

This bibliography of Darul Uloom Deoband is a selected list of generally available scholarly resources related to Darul Uloom Deoband, a leading Islamic seminary and Muslim theological centre in India at which the Deobandi movement began, founded in 1866. It is one of the most influential reform movements in modern Islam. It created a largest network of satellite madrasas all over the world especially India, Bangladesh, Pakistan, Afghanistan neighboring countries in Asia and beyond, and as far afield as the Caribbean, South Africa, United Kingdom and the United States. Islamic Revival in British India by Barbara D. Metcalf was the first major monograph specifically devoted to the institutional and intellectual history of Deoband. Syed Mehboob Rizwi wrote History of Darul Uloom Deoband in 1977 in 2 volumes. This list will include Books and theses written on Darul Uloom Deoband and articles published about Deoband in various journals, newspapers, encyclopedias, seminars, websites etc. in APA style. Only bibliography related to Darul Uloom Deoband will be included here, for Deobandi movement, see Bibliography of Deobandi Movement.

== Encyclopedias ==
- Adamec, Ludwig W. (2017). Historical dictionary of Islam (3rd ed.). Lanham: Rowman & Littlefield Publishers. p. 111. ISBN 978-1-4422-7724-3. OCLC 953919222.
- Ingram, Brannon (2018), "Deoband School", in Kassam, Zayn R.; Greenberg, Yudit Kornberg; Bagli, Jehan (eds.), Islam, Judaism, and Zoroastrianism, Encyclopedia of Indian Religions, Dordrecht: Springer Netherlands, pp. 208–213, doi:10.1007/978-94-024-1267-3_802, ISBN 978-94-024-1266-6
- Masood, Farid Uddin (1982), Shorter Encyclopaedia of Islam (PDF) (in Bengali) (5th ed.), Sherbangla Nagar, Dhaka: Islamic Foundation Bangladesh, pp. 481–482, ISBN 984-06-0252-7
- Moosa, Ebrahim (2022), "Deobandī School", Oxford Encyclopedia of the Islamic World, Oxford University Press, ISBN 978-0-19-766941-9
- Zeidan, Adam (2020), "Deoband school", Encyclopædia Britannica, Nabu Press, ISBN 9781144055460

== Books ==
- Adrawi, Asir (1995). Dabistān-i Devband kī ʻilmī k̲h̲idmāt [Educational services of Darul Uloom Deoband] (PDF) (in Urdu). Deoband, UP, India: Dārulmuʼallifīn. OCLC 47964786.
- Adravī, Asīr (1999). Dārulʻulūm Devband, iḥyā-yi Islām kī ʻaẓīm taḥrīk [Darul Uloom Deoband, the great movement of revival of Islam] (in Urdu). Deoband, UP, India: Dārulmūʼallifīn. OCLC 46969756.
- Aḥmad, Muḥammad Manṣūr (2006). Anār ke darak̲h̲t tale: Dārulʻulūm Devband (in Urdu). Karachi, Pakistan: Maktabatulīmān. OCLC 85016253.
- Al-Qāsmī, Ḥaqqānī (2006). Dārulʻulūm Devband: adabī shanāk̲h̲t nāmah (in Urdu). Deoband, UP, India: Āl Inḍiyā Tanẓīm ʻUlamā-yi Ḥaq. OCLC 294763042.
- Anjum, G̲h̲ulām Yaḥyá (1999). Dārulʻulūm Devband kā bānī kaun? (in Urdu). Mumbai, India: al-Dārussalafiyah. OCLC 45087088.
- Anṣārī, Nadīm Aḥmad (2019). Shiʻr-i faqīh: Devband se vābastah baʻẓ mashhūr muftiyān-i kirām aur unkī Urdū shāʻirī kā taz̲kirah (in Urdu). Mumbaʼī: al-Falāḥ Islāmik Fāʼūnḍeshan. ISBN 978-93-5351-187-6. OCLC 1233023145.
- Ar-Rahman, Mohammad Habib (2006). Darul Uloom Deoband Mubassharat, Known and Karamat of Akabir (in Bengali). Bangladesh: Al-Kawsar Publications.
- Arshad, Jubair (2019). Foundation of Darul Uloom Deoband: Life Lessons of Akabir (in Bengali). Bangladesh: Poro Publication.
- Asʻadī, Muḥammad ʻUbaidullāh (2000). Dār al-ʻUlūm Diyūband: madrasah fikrīyah tawjīhīyah, ḥarakah iṣlāḥīyah daʻwīyah, muʼassasah taʻlīmīyah tarbawīyah (PDF) (in Arabic). India: Akādīmīyat Shaykh al-Hind. OCLC 608949973.
- Arshad, Saʻīd; Fārūqī, Z̤iyā (2004). Jurʼat kā nām hae, Devband vāle (in Urdu). Karachi, Pakistan: Banorī Islāmik Rīkārḍing Senṭar. OCLC 56598186.
- Aʻẓamī, Abūlḥasan (2013). History of Department of Qiraat, Darul Uloom Deoband (in Urdu). Deoband, UP, India: Madarsah al-Imām ibn al-Jazarī. OCLC 978271570.
- Cag̲h̲tāʼī, Muḥammad ʻAbdullāh (1980). Qiyām-i Dārul ʻulūm Devband (in Urdu). Lāhaur, Pakistan: Maktabah-yi Maḥmūdiyyah. OCLC 9110495.
- Durrānī, Muḥammad Riyāz̤ (2001). Dārul ʻulūm Devband: Iḥyāʼe Islām kī ʻālamgīr taḥrīk (in Urdu). Lahore, Pakistan: Jamʻīyyat Pablīkeshanz. OCLC 48375019.
- Durranī, Muḥammad Riyāz̤. (2006). Karvān-i Devband: Ḍaiṛh Ṣad Sālah K̲h̲idmāt-i Devband Kānfarans Pishāvar kī tafṣīlī rīporṭ (in Urdu). Pakistan: Jamʻīyat Pablīkeshanz. OCLC 162145759.
- Gilani, Manazir Ahsan (2009). My memorable days at Darul Uloom Deoband (PDF) (in Urdu). Karachi, Pakistan: Maktabah-yi Rashīdiyah. OCLC 662156895.
- India President In Darul Uloom Deoband (PDF) (in Urdu). India: Daftar-e Ihtimam, Darul Uloom Deoband. 1957.
- Jamālī, Shāhīn (1980). Dārulʻulūm Devband kī tārīk̲h̲-i siyāsat (in Arabic). India: Daftar-i Ijlās-i Ṣad Sālah Dārulʻulūm Devband. OCLC 22208671.
- Miftahi, Zafeeruddin (2012). Dar al-Ulum Deoband: A Brief Account of its Establishment and Background. Translated by Siddiqui, Atique A. Johannesburg, South Africa: Imam Gangohi Academy of Research; Friends of Deoband.
- Miller, Frederic P.; Vandome, Agnes F.; John, McBrewster (2010). Darul Uloom Deoband. VDM Publishing. ISBN 978-613-1-79086-7.
- Mirza, Asad (2024). Demystifying Madrasah And Deobandi Islam. New Delhi: Vitasta Publishing. ISBN 9788119670765.
- Mirzā, Jānbāz (1980). Rūʼedād jashn-i Devband, munʻaqidah 21, 22, 23 Mārc 1980: Dārulʻulūm Devband kī ṣad sālah taqrībāt kī mukammal rūʼedād (in Urdu). Deoband, UP, India: Maktabah-yi Tabṣirah. OCLC 16273315.
- Neyazi, Taberez Ahmed (2014). Darul Uloom Deoband's Approach to Social Issues: Image, Reality, and Perception. UK: Oxford University Press. pp. 181–200. doi:10.1093/acprof:oso/9780198092063.003.0009. ISBN 9780199082872.
- Qāsmi, Aftāb Ghāzi; Qāsmi, Abdul Haseeb (2011). Fuzala e Deoband ki Fiqhi Khidmaat (in Urdu). Ḥaidarābād, India: Kutub K̲h̲ānah Naʻīmiyah. OCLC 813691816.
- Qasemi, Burhanuddin (2001). Darul Uloom Deoband: A Heroic Struggle Against The British Tyranny (PDF). Mumbai, India: Markazul Maarif.
- Qasmi, Fakhruddin Waheed (2015). The Role of Darul Uloom Deoband in Indian Politics (PDF). New Delhi: IFA Publications. Archived from the original (PDF) on 29 October 2022.
- Qāsimī, Jāvīd Ashraf (2000). Faiz̤ān-i Dārulʻulūm Devband (in Urdu). India: Madarsah Abī Ibn-i Kaʻb Taḥfīẓ al-Qurʼān al-Karīm, Qaṣbah Ghāsīṛah. OCLC 48055833.
- Qasmi, Khursheed Hasan (2003). Darul Uloom aur Deoband ki Tareekhi Shakhsiyaat (in Urdu). Deoband, UP, India: Maqtaba Tafsirul Quran.
- Qasmi, Mizanur Rahman, ed. (2010). Darul Uloom Deoband-Ulamaye Deoband Work and Contribution (in Bengali). Bangladesh: Darul Uloom Library.
- Qāsimī, Muḥammad Islām; Ṣiddīqī, Nasīm Aḥmad (1980). Dārulʻulūm Devband kī ek ṣadī kā ʻilmī safarnāmah (in Urdu). Deoband, UP, India: Maktabah-yi Dānish. OCLC 21970581.
- Qasmi, Nayab Hasan (2013). Darul Uloom Deoband Ka Sahafati Manzarnama [Journalistic Scenario Of Darul Uloom Deoband] (in Urdu). India: Idara Tahqueeq-e-islami Deoband. p. 116.
- Qasmi, Tayyib (1972). Tārīk̲h̲-i Dārulʻulūm-i Devband (PDF) (in Urdu). Pakistan: Dārulishāʻat.
- Qasmi, Tayyib (1999). Darul Uloom Deoband Ki 50 Misali Shakhsiyat (in Urdu). Deoband, UP, India: Maktabah-yi Faiz̤ulqurʼā. OCLC 45499890.
- Reetz, Dietrich (2009), "Change and Stagnation in Islamic Education: The Dar al-Ulum of Deoband after the Split in 1982", in Noor, Farish A; Sikand, Yoginder; van Bruinessen, Martin (eds.), The Madrasa in Asia, Amsterdam University Press, pp. 71–104, doi:10.1515/9789048501380-004, ISBN 978-90-485-0138-0
- Rizwi, Syed Mehboob (1980–1981). History of the Dar al-Ulum Deoband. UP, India: Idara-e Ihtemam, Darul Uloom Deoband. OCLC 20222197.
- Shahjahanpuri, Abu Salman (2005). Buzurgān-i Dārulʻulūm-i Devband (in Urdu). Lahore, Pakistan: Jamʻiyat Pablikeshanz. OCLC 156865214.
- Singhānvī, Iʻjāz Aḥmad K̲h̲ān̲; Devbandī, Navāz (2000). Hikāyāt-i aslāf-i Devband (in Urdu). Deoband, UP, India: Navāz Pablīkeshanz. OCLC 46353207.
- Spannaus, Nathan (2018), "Darul Uloom Deoband and South Asian Islam", in Bano, Masooda (ed.), Modern Islamic Authority and Social Change, Volume 1: Evolving Debates in Muslim Majority Countries, Edinburgh University Press, pp. 217–243, ISBN 978-1-4744-3324-2
- Ukāshah, Abū (2019). Tārīk̲h̲ ke qātil (in Urdu). Hyderabad, India: Faran Publications. OCLC 1106138522.
- ʻUs̲mānī, Muḥammad Taqī (2013). The great scholars of the Deoband Islamic Seminary (PDF). Abdur Raheem Kidwai, Muḥammad Taqī. Translation of: ʻUs̲mānī. London. ISBN 978-1-906949-26-6. OCLC 909332154.
- Z̤afīruddīn, Muḥammad (1970). Taʻāruf-i makhṭūṭāt Kutubk̲h̲ānah Dārulʻulūm Devband (in Urdu). India: Dārulʻulūm Devband. OCLC 23520232.
- Z̤afīruddīn, Muḥammad (1980). Mashāhīr ʻUlmāʼ Dārulʻulūm Devband (in Urdu). India: Daftar Ijlās Ṣad Sālah Dārulʻulūm Devband. OCLC 1132322576.

== Theses ==
- Ansari, Ishrat Hasain (1995). Role Of Dar-ul-uloom Deoband In National Movement And Its Contribution To The Cultural Development Of India (1866–1980) (PDF) (PhD thesis). India: Department of Medieval and Modern History, University of Allahabad.
- Arabi, Zikrullah (2019). Contribution of Darul Uloom Deoband to Arabic Journalism With Special Reference of Al-Die (Monthly Magazine) and Comprehensive Catalogue Upto 2013 (Thesis) (in Arabic). India: Maulana Azad National Urdu University. hdl:10603/337869.
- Hashmi, Syed Masroor Ali Akhtar (1985). A critical study of educational movements and institutions with special reference to Darul Ulum Deoband Aligarh Muslim University Aligarh Nadwatul Ulama Lucknow and Jamia Millia Islamia Delhi (PhD). India: Faculty of Education, Jamia Milia Islamia. hdl:10603/412250.
- Jahan, Ibrat (2013). Contribution of Darul Uloom Deoband to Seerah literature (PhD). India: Department of Islamic Studies, Aligarh Muslim University. hdl:10603/176381.
- Kaleem, Mohd (2017). Contribution of Old boys of Darul uloom Deoband in Hadith Literature (PhD) (in Urdu). India: Department of Sunni Theology, Aligarh Muslim University. hdl:10603/364028.
- Kumar, Akriti (2023). Modernization and reform in Islamic education a comparative study of Darul Ulum Deoband and Nadwatul Ulama (1870–1950) (PhD thesis). India: School of Social Sciences, Jawaharlal Nehru University. hdl:10603/575189.
- Shamsuzzaman, Muhammad (2019). Role of Deoband Madrasa in Anti-British Movement (PhD thesis) (in Bengali). Bangladesh: Department of Islamic History and Culture,University of Dhaka. Archived from the original on 3 June 2022.
- Uddin, Shahab (2006). Beeswin Sadi Main Ulama e Jamia Azhar Misr or Ulama e Darul Uloom Deoband Ki Tafseeri Khidmaat Ka Taqabuli Mutalah (PhD). India: Department of Sunni Theology, Aligarh Muslim University. hdl:10603/250326.
- Wani, Bilal Ahmad (2012). Contribution of Darul Ulum Deoband to the Development of Tafsir (PDF) (MA thesis). Srinagar, India: Shah-i-Hamadan Institute of Islamic Studies, University of Kashmir.

== Journals ==
- Akhtar, Muhammad Naveed (2022). "Darul Ulum Deoband: Preserving Religious And Cultural Integrity Of South Asian Muslims Through Structural And Strategic Innovations". Hamdard Islamicus. 45 (3): 79–100. doi:10.57144/hi.v45i3.326. ISSN 0250-7196. S2CID 252890505.
- Ali, Ahmad (1996). "The Dar Al-ulum Of Deoband: A Religio-political Movement For The Indian Muslims". Islamic Quarterly. 40 (1). London: 23. ISSN 0021-1842.
- Ansari, Shahabuddin (1980). "Darul Uloom Deoband". Islamic Quarterly. 24 (3). London: 111. ISSN 0021-1842.
- Geaves, Ron (2012). "The symbolic construction of the walls of Deoband". Islam and Christian–Muslim Relations. 23 (3): 315–328. doi:10.1080/09596410.2012.676780. ISSN 0959-6410. S2CID 145625410.
- Hakim, Masykur (2009). "From India to the World: Darul Uloom Deoband's Role in Preserving Hadith and the Sciences of Hadith". Refleksi. 11 (2): 155–168. doi:10.15408/ref.v11i2.38056. ISSN 2714-6103.
- Ingram, Brannon D. (2015). "Crises of the Public in Muslim India: Critiquing 'Custom' at Aligarh and Deoband". South Asia: Journal of South Asian Studies. 38 (3): 403–418. doi:10.1080/00856401.2015.1055420. ISSN 0085-6401. S2CID 143332373.
- Ingram, Brannon D. (2019). "'Modern' Madrasa: Deoband and Colonial Secularity". Historical Social Research. 44 (3 (169)): 206–225. ISSN 0172-6404. JSTOR 26747455.
- Jan, Samin; Hilali, AZ (2019). "Deoband Inspired Politico-Educational Movement in Pakhtūnkhwa during the British Rᾱj" (PDF). Tahdhīb al Afkār. 6 (2): 17–33. ISSN 2411-6211.
- Khan, Alam (2021). "The Role of al-Madāris in the Indian Subcontinent in Serving of Prophetic Sunnah: The Case of Dârul-Ulum Deoband and Nadwatü'l-Ulema". Journal of Recep Tayyip Erdogan University Faculty of Theology (in Arabic) (19): 165–178. doi:10.32950/rteuifd.891911. ISSN 2147-2823. S2CID 236403993.
- Khan, AN (1985). "Mawlana Mahmud al-Hasan (1851-to 1920): His Contribution to Dar-ul-Uloom, Deoband". Journal of the Pakistan Historical Society. 33 (2): 123. ISSN 0030-9796.
- Khan, Shafique Ali (1990). "Some Ideological and Intellectual Deviations of the Scholars of Deoband Darul Uloom From the Fundamentals of Wali Allahi Philosophy". Journal of the Pakistan Historical Society. 38 (3): 192–219. ISSN 0030-9796.
- Metcalf, Barbara (1978). "The Madrasa at Deoband: A Model for Religious Education in Modern India". Modern Asian Studies. 12 (1): 111–134. doi:10.1017/S0026749X00008179. ISSN 0026-749X. S2CID 145793477.
- Momen, Abdul; Ebrahimi, Mansoureh; Hassan, Ahmad Muhyuddin (2023). "Identifying the Role of the First 'Qawmi Madrasah' Darul Uloom Deoband in the Indian Subcontinent". Environment-Behaviour Proceedings Journal. 8 (SI14): 65–71. doi:10.21834/e-bpj.v8iSI14.5055. ISSN 2398-4287.
- Mubarok, Asep Syahrul; Imtihanah, Anis Hidayatul; Tanzilulloh, M. Ilham (2021). "Eksistensi Gerakan Dar Al-ulum Deoband Dan Dar Al-ulum Nadwat Al-ulama". Prosiding Muktamar Pemikiran Dosen Pmii (in Indonesian). 1 (1): 55–68. ISSN 2798-1487. Archived from the original on 2 November 2022.
- Mughni, Syafiq A.; Firdausi, Ahmad; Akmaliyah, Akmaliyah (2019). "Dar al-Ulum of Deoband: An Education, Propagation, and Islamic Political Movement in India". Tawarikh. 10 (2): 87–102. doi:10.2121/tawarikh.v10i2.1136 (inactive 11 July 2025). ISSN 2085-0980.
- Naveed, Muhammad; Rizwan, Muhammad; Qadari, Abul Rasheed (2020). "Modernity and Islam in South-Asia: Approach of Darul Ulum Deoband Movement" (PDF). Journal of Academic Research for Humanities. 2 (1): 1–8. ISSN 2663-192X. Archived from the original (PDF) on 1 November 2022.
- Nazemianfard, Ali (2011). "Dar ul-Ulum of Deoband: Backgrounds and strategies". Journal of Subcontinent Researches (in Persian). 3 (9): 129–148. doi:10.22111/jsr.2012.823 (inactive 11 July 2025).
- Qureshi, Hamid Afaq (1991). "Funds Raising Devices And The Role Of The State Of Hyderabad And Bhopal In The Economic Viability Of The Dar-ul Uloom, Deoband, U.P. (1866-1976): Summary". Proceedings of the Indian History Congress. 52: 815–816. ISSN 2249-1937. JSTOR 44142713.
- Qureshi, Rehana; Akhter, Maher Mohammad Sayeed (2014). "A critical study of the educational and contemporary services of Darul uloom Deoband". Al-Idah (in Arabic). 28 (1): 142–156. ISSN 2664-3375.
- Rahman, Abdur (2018). "Contributions Of The Scholars Of Darul Uloom Deoband To The Development Of Arabic Journalism In India". Aldebal (in Arabic). 3 (1): 63–73. ISSN 2415-5500.
- Ramzan, Shazia (2013). "Darul Uloom Deoband-Its Evolution in the 19th Century British India and Impact on the System of Education in Pakistan" (PDF). FWU Journal of Social Sciences. 7 (2): 157–164. ISSN 1995-1272.
- Ramzan, Shazia; Rubab, Ainee (2017). "A Comprative Study Of The Ideological Orientations And Methodology Of Dar Ul Uloom Deoband, Nadwatul Ulama And Aligarh School". Al Qalam. 22 (1): 1–10. doi:10.51506/alQalam.26(2)279 (inactive 11 July 2025). ISSN 2707-0077. Archived from the original on 21 October 2022.
- Reetz, Dietrich (2005). "Dār al-'Ulūm Deoband and its Self-Representation on the Media [Corrected Title: Dār al-'Ulūm Deoband and its Mediatic Self-Representation]". Islamic Studies. 44 (2): 209–227. doi:10.52541/isiri.v44i2.4698. ISSN 0578-8072. JSTOR 20838962.
- Sa'diyah, Fatichatus (2020). "Deoband dan Perannya Bagi Muslim India". Al-Thiqah: Jurnal Ilmu Keislaman (in Malay). 3 (1): 17–38. ISSN 2685-9467.
- Sikand, Yoginder (2008). "Reflections on Deoband's Anti-Terrorism Convention". Economic and Political Weekly. 43 (12/13): 13–15. ISSN 0012-9976. JSTOR 40277272.
- Sikand, Yoginder (2010). "Deoband's Fatwas on Women". Economic and Political Weekly. 45 (21): 15–17. ISSN 0012-9976. JSTOR 27807043.
- Sofi, Mohammad Dawood (2013). "Dar al ulum Deoband and Tasawwuf: A Brief Study of Moulana Rashid Ahmad Gangohi" (PDF). Hazara Islamicus (in Urdu). 02 (1): 19–28. ISSN 2305-3283. Archived from the original (PDF) on 19 May 2022.
- Templin, James D. (2015). "Religious Education of Pakistan's Deobandi Madaris and Radicalisation". Counter Terrorist Trends and Analyses. 7 (5): 15–21. ISSN 2382-6444. JSTOR 26351354.
- Wani, Bilal (2014). "Muslim Response to Western Education: A Study of Darul Ulum Deoband". Islamic Literature Review. 1 (2): 60–72. ISSN 2349-1795. SSRN 3879106.
- Wani, Bilal Ahmad (2016). "A Study Of Contribution Of Darul-ulum Deoband To The Development Of Fiqh". South Asia Journal of Multidisciplinary Studies. 1 (12): 1–8. ISSN 2395-1079. SSRN 3870768.
- Zaini, Achmad (2022). "Traditional Ulama Movement Against Invaders: Darul Uloom Deoband, India and Pesantren Tebuireng, Indonesia". Islamica: Jurnal Studi Keislaman. 16 (2): 194–221. doi:10.15642/islamica.2022.16.2.194-221 (inactive 11 July 2025). ISSN 2356-2218. Archived from the original on 1 November 2022.
- Zin, Aizan Hj Ali (1999). "Islamic Institution of Education In British India: A Study on Deoband Madrasah". Jurnal Usuluddin (in Malay). 9: 113–132. ISSN 0128-0708.

== Newspapers ==
- Ahmad, Mahfuz (22 August 2017). "Darul Uloom Deoband and two Muslim world tourists". Kaler Kantho (in Bengali). Bangladesh.
- Ahmed, Saad (24 September 2019). "Deoband's amazing achievements around the world". Kaler Kantho (in Bengali). Bangladesh.
- Akbar, M.J. (4 February 2011). "The many battles for Deoband". The Daily Star. Bangladesh.
- Bin Wahid, Muhammad (31 May 2021). "155 years of Deoband Madrasa, a traditional religious institution". Daily Naya Diganta (in Bengali). Bangladesh.
- Chishti, Seema (27 July 2011). "The idea of Deoband". The Indian Express.
- Ghosh, Shubhojoti (24 January 2019). "Why do foreign Muslims still rely on India's Deoband for religious interpretation?". BBC Bangla (in Bengali). India.
- Khosru, Ataur Rahman (26 April 2019). "Six Oldest Centers of Islamic Learning". Kaler Kantho (in Bengali). Bangladesh.
- Muhammad Ubaidullah, Munshi (17 February 2017). "The Four Walls of Darul Uloom Deoband". Amader Orthoneeti (in Bengali). Bangladesh. Archived from the original on 27 March 2023.
- Puri, Luv (3 December 2009). "Deobands battle for survival". Dawn. Pakistan.
- Qasemi, Habibur Rahman (14 February 2014). "Responsibility of Darul Uloom Deoband and successors". Kaler Kantho (in Bengali). Bangladesh.

== Documentaries ==
- Ghosh, Shubhojoti (25 January 2019). Why is India's Darul Uloom Deoband Madrasa important to Muslims? (Videotape) (in Bengali). BBC Bangla.
- Indira Gandhi At Deoband – Centenary Celebrations Of Darul Uloom (webm) (Television production) (in Hindi). India: Prasar Bharati. 1980.
- Inside the Muslim Deoband (Videotape). India: NDTV. 2005.

== Seminars ==
- Neyazi, Taberez Ahmed (2010). Darul Uloom Deoband: Stemming the Tide of Radical Islam in India. RSIS Working Paper. Singapore: S. Rajaratnam School of International Studies, Nanyang Technological University.

== Websites ==
- "Dar-ul-Uloom Deoband". Changing Structure of Islamic Authority, University of Oxford. Archived from the original on 28 January 2022.

== Other ==
=== Theses ===
- Ahmed, Fakhar Uddin Ali (2010). Arabic studies in educational institutions of Assam since 1947 (PhD thesis). India: Gauhati University. pp. 200–204. hdl:10603/67546.
- Ansari, Mohammad Asjad (2017). Modern education in Madrasas A perspective study of different schools of thought (PhD thesis). Jamia Milia Islamia. pp. 114–126. hdl:10603/312804.
- Mujab, Muhammad (2001). Islamic sciences in india and indonesia: a comparative study (PhD thesis). India: Department of Sunni Theology, Aligarh Muslim University. pp. 67–84. hdl:10603/58830.

=== Books ===
- Hashmi, Syed Masroor Ali Akhtar; Hashmi, Masroor (1989). Muslim Response to Western Education: A Study of Four Pioneer Institutions. Commonwealth Publishers. ISBN 978-81-7169-005-3. OCLC 21149483.
- Sikand, Yoginder (2005). Bastions of the believers: madrasas and Islamic education in India. New Delhi: Penguin Books India. ISBN 978-0-14-400020-3. OCLC 64267397.
- Tareen, SherAli K. (2020). Defending Muḥammad in modernity. Notre Dame, Indiana. ISBN 978-0-268-10671-3. OCLC 1136108861.

== See also ==
- Bibliography of Deobandi Movement
- List of Darul Uloom Deoband alumni
