= Mission of Amr bin Umayyah al-Damri =

The Mission of Amr bin Umayyah al-Damri
Date	625
Location	Mecca
Result	Failed assassination, but successful escape

Belligerents
Muslims of Medina	Quraysh of Mecca

Commanders and leaders
Amr bin Umayyah al-Damri	None

Strength
2	N/A

Casualties and losses
none	3 polytheists killed 1 captured

The Mission of Amr b. Umayyah al-Damri against Abu Sufyan occurred in AH 4 of the Islamic Calendar i.e. AD 625.

According to Ar-Rahīq al-Makhtum (the Sealed Nectar), a modern Islamic biography of Muhammad written by the Indian Muslim author Safi-ur Rahman Mubarakpuri, biographers have said that Amr bin Umayyah al-Damri was sent on an errand to kill Abu Sufyan (the leader of the Quraysh), who had also sent a Bedouin to kill Muhammad. The Mission was unsuccessful, but Amr bin Umayyah al-Damri killed three polytheists along the way.

== The Mission ==
=== Reason for mission ===
Muhammad ordered the Mission of Amr bin Umayyah al-Damri to assassinate Abu Sufyan to avenge Khubyab bin Adi. According to the Muslim scholar Safiur Rahman Mubarakpuri, the Quraysh ordered Khubyab bin Adi to be crucified by Uqba bin al-Harith because he had killed Uqba bin al-Harith's father.

=== Events during the mission ===
Per Al-Tabari, Amr bin Umayyah al-Damri set out and first visited the Ka'bah where he was spotted by one of the Meccans. The Muslim assassins then fled and hid in a cave. While the Muslims were still in the cave Uthman bin Malik al-Taymi came close riding his horse while they were hiding. Then Amr bin Umayyah al-Damri came out of hiding and killed him, he "stabbed him below the breast" with a dagger and al-Taymi gave out a loud scream which other Meccans heard.

The Muslims remained in the cave until the pursuers left. They then went to al-Tanim and found the spot where Khubyab bin Adi was crucified on a cross. Al-Damri untied Khubayb from the cross, and traveled "forty paces" before he was spotted. He dropped Khubayb's body and again hid in a cave.

While he was in the cave a Bedouin shepherd from the Banu Bakr tribe passed by, he had one eye as he had lost an eye .He asked "Who is there?", al-Damri replied: "One of the Banu Bakr.". The Bedouin lay down next to al-Damri and began to sing "♬ I will not be a Muslim as long as I live ♬" and al-Damri replied "You will soon see!". The Bedouin then went to sleep and al-Damri states:

I went to him and killed him in the most dreadful way that anybody has ever killed anybody. I leant over him, stuck the end of my bow into his good eye, and thrust it down until it came out of the back of his neck. After that I rushed out like a wild beast [Tabari, Volume 7, p. 148]

Al-Damri then fled and came to a place called al-Naqi. At this place there were two Meccans sent as spies by the Quraysh to check on Muhammad. Al-Damri "shot an arrow at one of them and killed him", and he then called on the other spy to surrender. After he surrendered, he tied him up, brought him to Muhammad and told him what happened after being questioned about it. Muhammad looked at him and laughed.

"Well done!" he said, and prayed for me to be blessed. [Tabari, Volume 7, p. 148]

== Islamic tertiary sources ==
The incident is mentioned by the Sunni Muslim scholar Tabari, in Tabari, Volume 7 as follows:

After the death of Khubayb and his companions, the messenger of God sent me together with one of the Ansar, saying "Go to Abu Sufyan b. Harb and kill him." I and my companion set out. I had a camel and he had not, and he had a weakness in his foot, so I carried him on my camel until we reached the valley of Ya'jaj. Then we hobbled our camel in the bottom of a ravine and climbed up. I said to my companion, "Come with me to Abu Sufyan's house, as I am going to try to kill him. You keep watch, and if a patrol comes or something alarms you, get back to your camel, mount it, return to Medina, and go to the Messenger of God and tell him what has happened. You can leave me to my own devices, because I know the town well, am bold, and have strong legs."

When we entered Mecca I had with me the like of an eagle's secondary feather-meaning his dagger-which I had ready to kill anybody who laid hold of me. My companion said to me, "Shall we make a start by circumambulating the Ka`bah seven times and praying two rak`ahs?" I said to him, "I know the people of Mecca better than you do. When it gets dark, they sprinkle their courtyards with water and sit in them; and I am better known there than a piebald horse."

But he kept on pestering me until in the end we went to the Ka`bah, circumambulated it seven times, and prayed two rak`ahs. When we came out we went past a group of men sitting together, and one of them recognized me and shouted out at the top of his voice, "That is `Amr b. Umayyah!" The Meccans rushed after us, saying "By God, `Amr b. Umayyah has not come here for any good purpose! By the God by whom we swear, he has never come here except for some evil purpose!" (`Amr had been a cutthroat and a desperado before accepting Islam).

They set out in pursuit of my companion and myself, and I said to him, "Let us get out of here! This is just what I was afraid of! We will never reach Abu Sufyan now, so save your own skin." We left at full speed, took to the hills, and hid in a cave, where we spent the night. In this way we gave them the slip, and they had to return without us. As we went into the cave, I concealed the entrance with stones, saying to my companion, "Let us wait here until the hue and cry has died down; they are sure to hunt for us the rest of the night and all tomorrow until the evening." I was still in the cave when, by God, `Uthman b. Malik b. `Ubayd Allah al-Taymi came up riding proudly on his horse. He kept coming nearer and nearer, riding proudly on his horse, until he reached the entrance to our cave. I said to my companion, "This is Ibn Malik. By God, if he sees us, he will tell everyone in Mecca about us!" So I went out and stabbed him below the breast with my dagger. He gave a shout which all the Meccans heard, and they came up to him while I went back to my hiding place, went in and said to my companion, "Stay where you are!" The Meccans hastily followed the shout, and found him on the point of death. They asked him, who had wounded him. "`Amr b. Umayyah," he replied, and died. They could not find anything to show them where we were, and merely said, "By God, we knew that he came for no good purpose." The death of their companion impeded their search for us, for they carried him away. We remained in the cave for two days until the pursuit had died down and then went out to al-Tan`im, where Khubayb's cross was. My companion said to me, "Shall we take Khubayb down from his cross?" "Where is he?" I said. "You can see him over there," he said. "Very well," I said, "but leave it to me, and keep well away from me." The cross was watched over by a guard, so I said to the Ansari, "If you are afraid of anything, make your way to your camel, mount it, go to the Messenger of God, and tell him what has happened." I went quickly to Khubayb's cross, untied him, and carried him on my back, but I had gone no more than forty paces when they spotted me. At once I threw him down, and I will never forget the sound his body made when it fell. They ran after me, and I took the path to al-Safra' and managed to throw them off. They went back, while my companion made his way to his camel, mounted it, went to the Prophet and told him what had happened to us. I proceeded on foot until I was overlooking Ghalil Dajnan. There I went into a cave with my bow and arrows. While I was in it a tall one-eyed man from the Banu al-Dil b. Bakr came in driving some sheep. He said, "Who is there?" and I said, "One of the Banu Bakr."214 He said, "I am from the Banu Bakr, one of the Banu al-Dil." Then he lay down next to me, and raised his voice in song: I will not be a Muslim as long as I live, and will not believe in the faith of the Muslims. I said, "You will soon see!" Before long the beduin went to sleep and started snoring, and I went to him and killed him in the most dreadful way that anybody has ever killed anybody. I leant over him, stuck the end of my bow into his good eye, and thrust it down until it came out of the back of his neck. After that I rushed out like a wild beast and took to the highway like an eagle, fleeing for my life. First, I came to such and such a village, then to Rakubah, and then to al-Naqi`. At this place there were two Meccans whom Quraysh had sent to spy out how things were with the Messenger of God. I recognized them and called on them to surrender. "Shall we surrender to you?" they said; so I shot an arrow at one of them and killed him, and then called on the other to surrender. He did so and I tied him up and took him to the Messenger of God.

According to Ibn Humayd-Salamah-Ibn Ishaq-Sulayman b. Wardan-his father-`Amr b. Umayyah: When I came to Medina, I went past some shaykhs of the Ansar. "By God," they said, "that is `Amr b. Umayyah!" Some boys heard what they were saying and rushed to the Messenger of God to tell him. I had tied my prisoner's thumbs together with my bowstring, and the Messenger of God looked at him and laughed so that his back teeth could be seen. Then he questioned me and I told him what had happened. "Well done!" he said, and prayed for me to be blessed. [Tabari, Volume 7, p. 147-150]

== See also ==
- Military career of Muhammad
- List of expeditions of Muhammad
