= Majid Ali Jaunpuri =

Indian Islamic scholar

Muhaddith Manwi, Maulana Majid Ali Jaunpuri

Personal life
- Born: Mani Kalan, Jaunpur
- Died: 1935
- Region: Colonial India
- Main interest(s): Hadith, Logic, Philosophy
- Education: Darul Uloom Deoband

Religious life
- Religion: Islam
- Denomination: Sunni
- Jurisprudence: Hanafi
- Movement: Deobandi

Muslim leader
- Teacher: Rashid Ahmad Gangohi
- Influenced: Syed Fakhruddin Ahmad, Shukrullah Mubarakpuri, Azad Subhani, Abdul Ghani Phulpuri

Majid Ali Jaunpuri (also known as Muhaddith Manwi; died 1935) was an Indian Sunni Islamic scholar and a rationalist thinker. He was mainly known for his work in the subjects of logic and hadith. He was an alumnus of the Darul Uloom Deoband and is reported to have written a marginalia to Sunan Abu Dawud and Jami` at-Tirmidhi.

== Biography ==
Jaunpuri was born in Mani Kalan, a village in Jaunpur. He studied with Abdul Haq Khairabadi, Lutfullah Aligarhi and Abdul Haq Kabuli. He graduated from the Darul Uloom Deoband in 1896 (1314 AH). He attended Hadith lectures of Rashid Ahmad Gangohi for two years. He acquired the knowledge of rational sciences from Abdul Haq Khairabadi and Ahmad Hasan Kanpuri.

Jaunpuri taught in the Madrasa al-Arabiyyah in Gulaothi, and then in the Madrasa al-Arabiyyah in Mendhu, Aligarh. Later, he taught in the Madrasa al-Azīzyah in Bihar and then returned to teach in Mendhu. He went to Kolkata, where he was appointed as the Head teacher of Aliah University, then "Madrasa Alia". He taught logic, reason and philosophy. He also taught in Delhi's religious schools. His students include Abdul Ghani Phulpuri, (Note: Abdul Ghani Phulpuri was a Sufi scholar who established the Baitul Uloom seminary in Sarai Meer.)Syed Fakhruddin Ahmad, Shukrullah Mubarakpuri and Muslim Jaunpuri. (Note: Muslim Jaunpuri was a rational scholar and philosopher. He was the step father of Abdul Haq Azmi.)

According to Asir Adrawi, Jaunpuri has written marginalia to the Sunan Abu Dawud and Jami` at-Tirmidhi. Habib ar-Rahman Qasmi mentions that, "Although, Muhaddith Manwi was an imam of logic and philosophy, but he was very much inspired by Maulana Rashid Ahmad Gangohi in the span of 4 years. Then he served, along with the other disciplines of knowledge, mainly the discipline of Hadith. In the six books of Hadith, he was mainly attached with Bukhari and Tirmidhi and used to lecture on both wholeheartedly." Jaunpuri died in 1935.

== See also ==
- List of Deobandis
