= Khalid Hafiz =

New Zealander imam

Sheikh Khalid Hafīz

Personal life
- Born: 1 December 1938 Mubarakpur, India
- Died: 6 December 1999 (aged 61) Wellington, New Zealand
- Parent: Qazi Athar Mubarakpuri
- Education: Darul Uloom Deoband

Religious life
- Religion: Islam

Khalid Kamal Hafīz (Urdu:شیخ خالد کمال عبدالحفیظ, known with his honorifics as Sheikh Khalid Kamal Abdul Hafiz; 1 December 1938 Mubarakpur, British Raj – 6 December 1999 Wellington, New Zealand) was an Indian-born Imam who served as the senior religious advisor to the New Zealand Muslim community from 1982 to 1999.

== As Imam ==
In 1992, Hafiz was interviewed by the Porirua newspaper Te Awa-iti regarding the Hajj although he declined to have his photograph taken directly following hate mail: "Khalid says he does not wish to complain and he is happy living in New Zealand society. We recognize that some people will be good, others not so good."

== Death ==
Hafiz died in the Wellington suburb of Rongotai at the age of 61. Over 200 people attended his funeral and he was remembered in the Evening Post obituary as “an imam as imams should be, but rarely are.” The Post continued:

Sheikh Khalid’s impact spread wider than New Zealand and on his death messages of sympathy were received by Wellington Muslims from the Muslim World League and the World Assembly of Muslim Youth as well as Muslims in Fiji and Australia. There were also condolences from Pakistan, Egypt, Jordan and Saudi Arabia as well as the embassies of Iran and Turkey in Wellington.

== Literature ==
- Bob Shaw, “An imam ‘as imams should be, but rarely are’ ” in The Evening Post (16 December 1999), page. 5.
- “NZ Muslims threatened over Gulf crisis” in The New Zealand Herald (22 August 1990), page.1.
- “Peacelink” (October 1990), page. 1.
- Charles Mabbett, “Fasting and Feasting” in City Voice (2 March 1995), page.4.
- Drury, Abdullah, Islam in New Zealand: The First Mosque (Christchurch, 2007) ISBN 978-0-473-12249-2
- "Looking to Makkah" in Te Awa-iti (11 June 1992), page. 5.

== See also ==
- List of Deobandis

== External sources ==
https://www.iman.co.nz/index.htm?innerpage_fk.htm?khutbah/kava.htm
