= Bibliography of Deobandi movement =

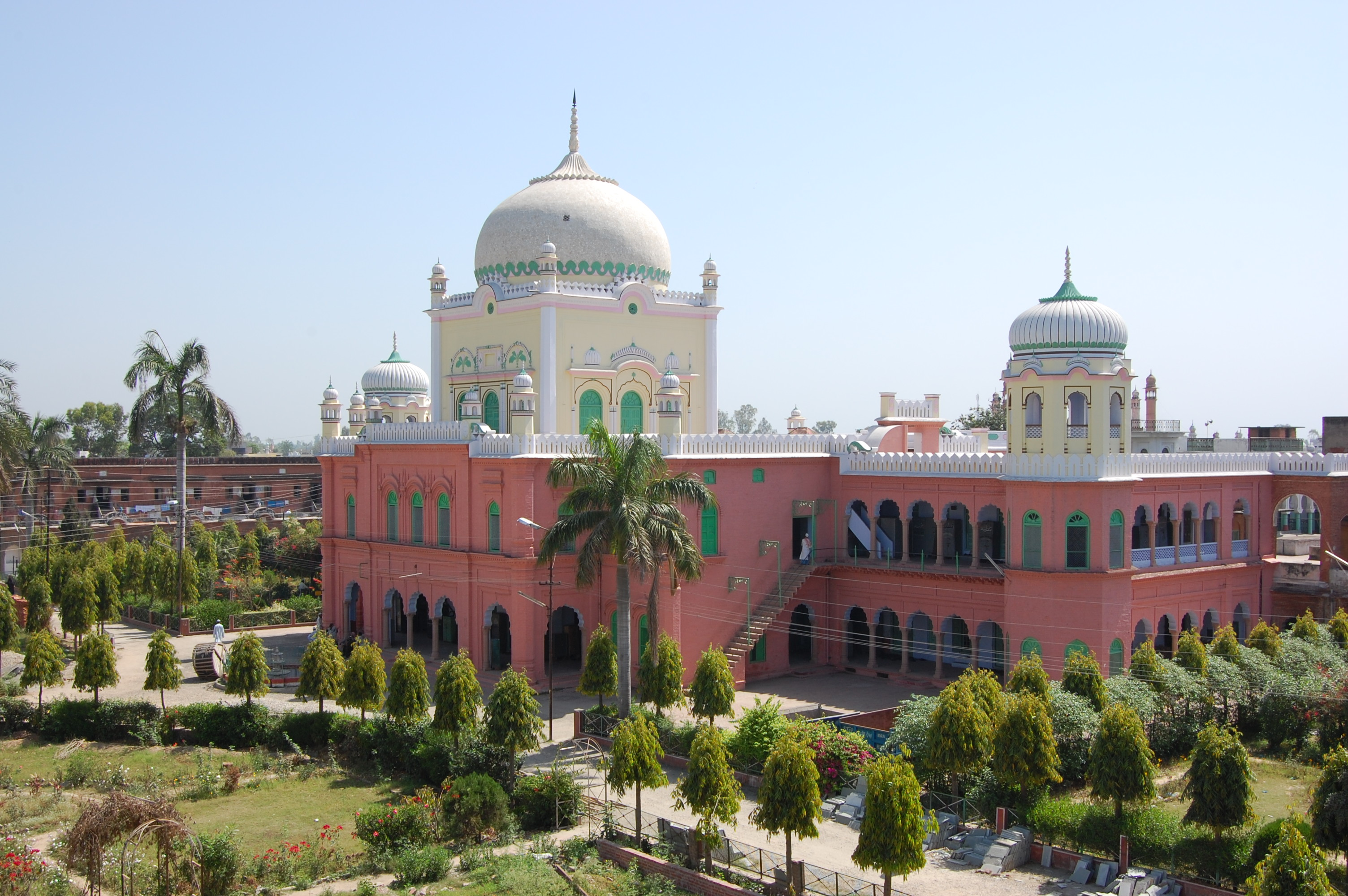
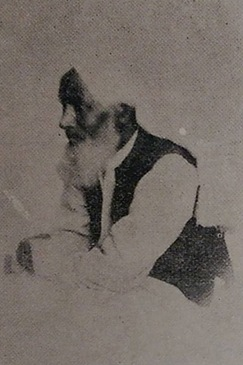
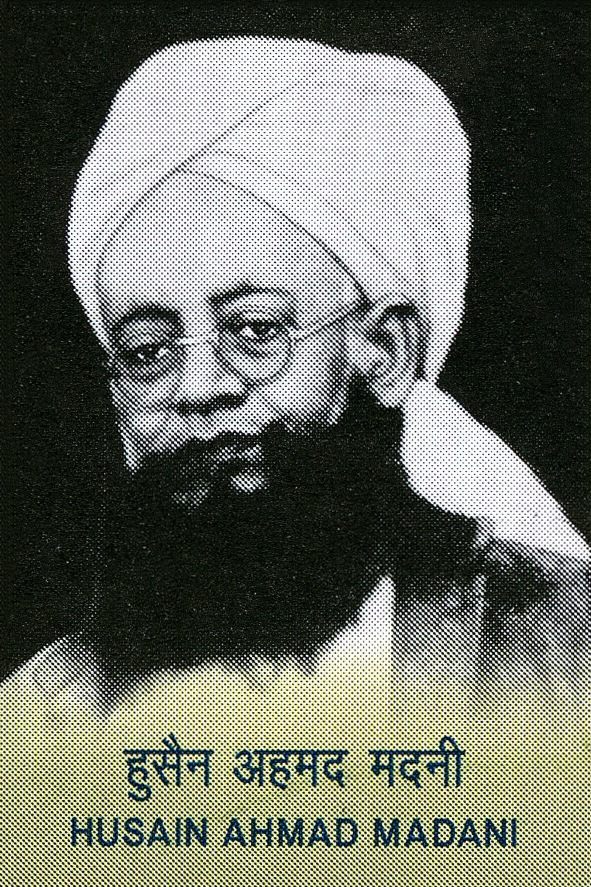
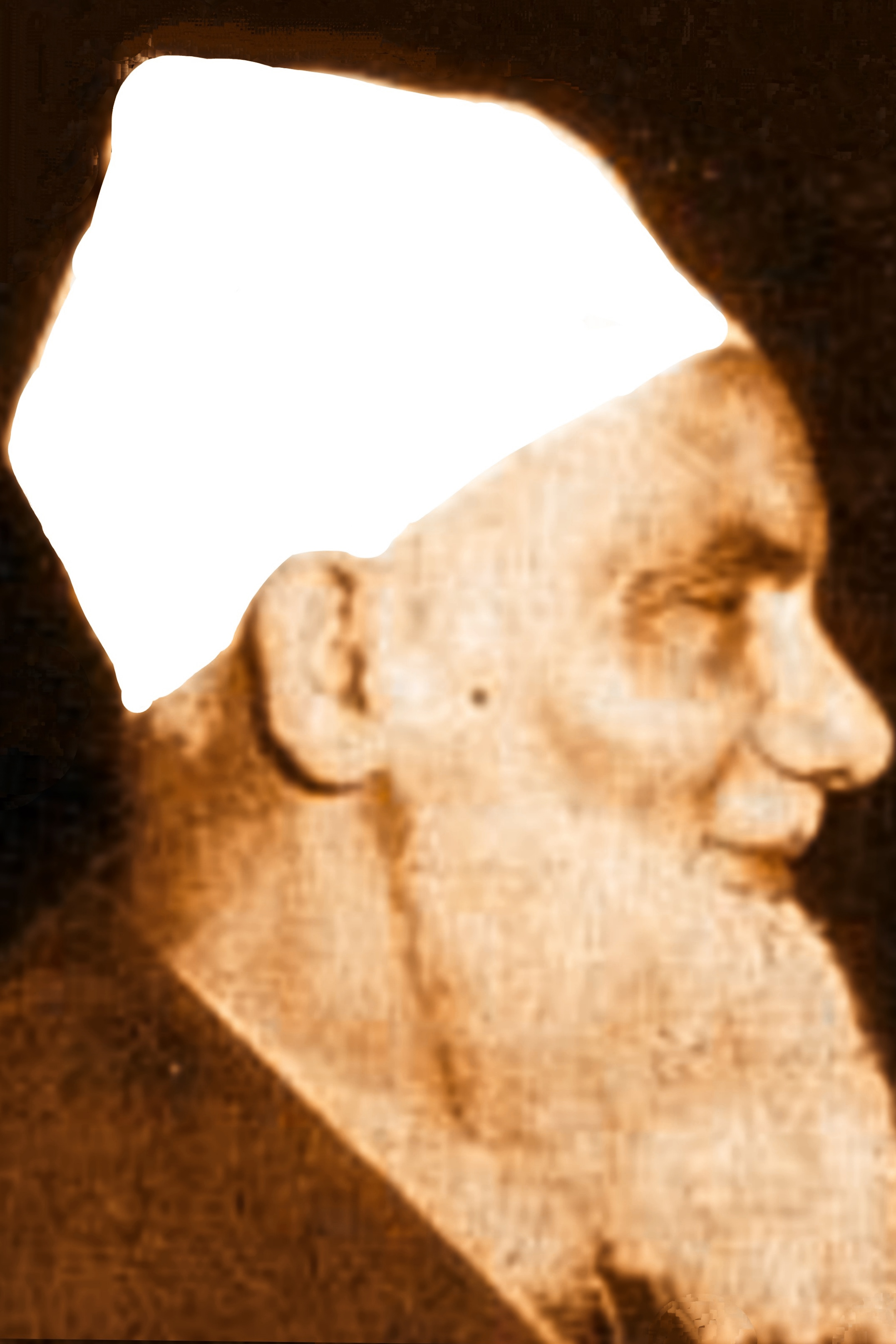
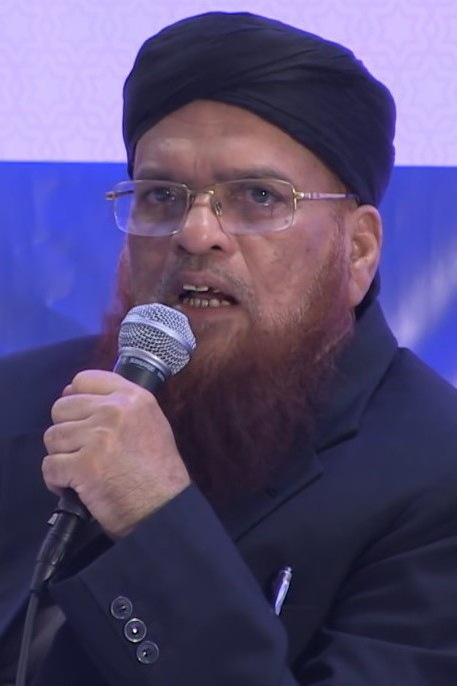
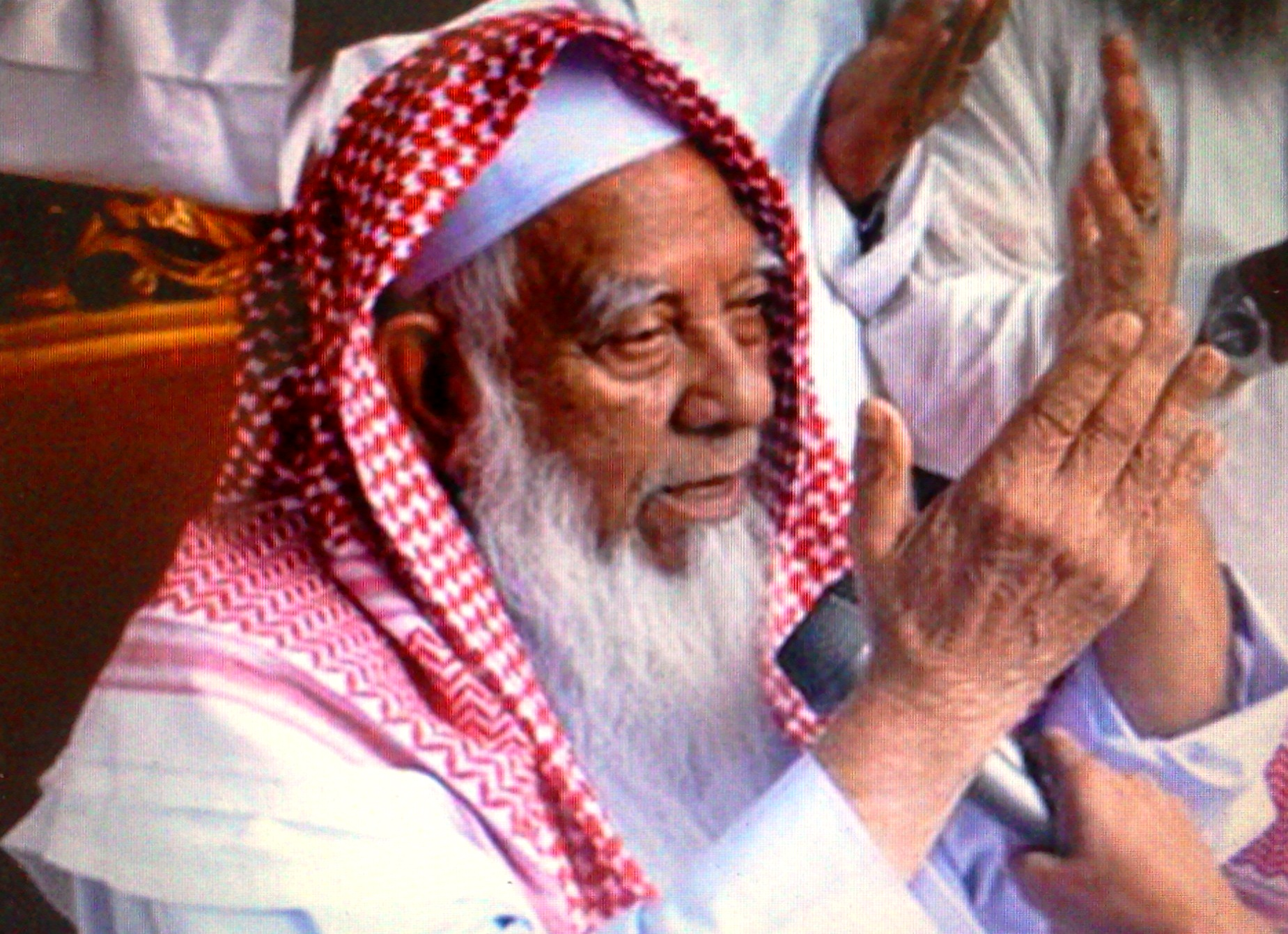
- Clockwise from top: Darul Uloom Deoband, Hussain Ahmad Madani, Taqi Usmani, Shah Ahmad Shafi, Shabbir Ahmad Usmani, Mahmud Hasan Deobandi

This bibliography of Deobandi Movement is a selected list of generally available scholarly resources related to Deobandi Movement, a revivalist movement within Sunni Islam, adhering to the Hanafi school of law, formed in the late 19th century around the Darul Uloom Deoband in British India, from which the name derives, by Qasim Nanawtawi, Rashid Ahmad Gangohi and several others, after the Indian Rebellion of 1857–58. It is one of the most influential reform movements in modern Islam. Islamic Revival in British India by Barbara D. Metcalf was the first major monograph specifically devoted to the institutional and intellectual history of this movement. Muhammad Tayyib Qasmi wrote a book named The Tradition of the Scholars of Deoband: Maslak Ulama-i-Deoband, a primary source on the contours of Deobandi ideology. In this work, he tried to project Deoband as an ideology of moderation that is a composite of various knowledge traditions in Islam. This list will include Books and theses written on Deobandi Movement and articles published about this movement in various journals, newspapers, encyclopedias, seminars, websites etc. in APA style. Only bibliography related to Deobandi Movement will be included here, for Darul Uloom Deoband, see Bibliography of Darul Uloom Deoband.

The bibliography covers works in multiple languages, including English, Urdu, Arabic, and Persian. It includes works on the movement's founders and key figures, its intellectual and religious traditions, and its relationship to other Islamic movements and schools of thought. The bibliography also covers works on the social and political impact of the Deobandi Movement, including its role in the partition of India and the creation of Pakistan. The bibliography provides a resource for scholars and researchers interested in the history and impact of the Deobandi Movement.

== Source overview ==
=== Deoband Institute of Islamic Thought ===
First Issue Cover of Islamic Literature Review

Founded in 2012, the Deoband Institute of Islamic Thought (DIIT) is based in India and focuses on promoting research into Deobandi intellectual traditions. The institute offers programs in the Deobandi movement, Islamic banking and finance, ranging from certificates and diplomas to vocational and postgraduate education. Its goal is to expand the reach of Deobandi scholarship, particularly to Arab and Western academic audiences. DIIT also produces Islamic Literature Review (ISSN 2349-1795), a bilingual journal published twice a year in Arabic and English.

=== Hujjatul Islam Academy ===
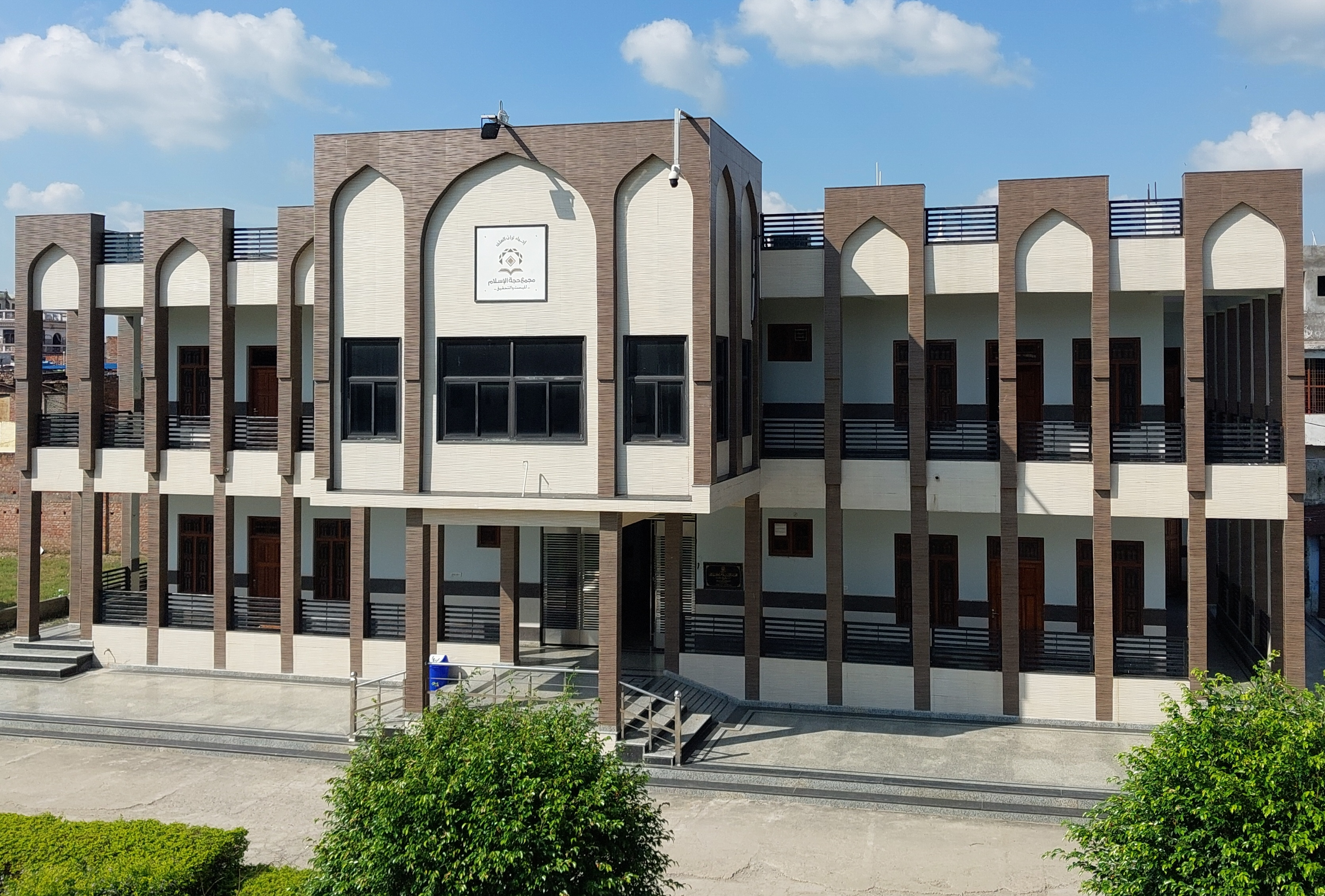
Front View of Hujjatul Islam Academy

=== Shaikhul Hind Academy ===
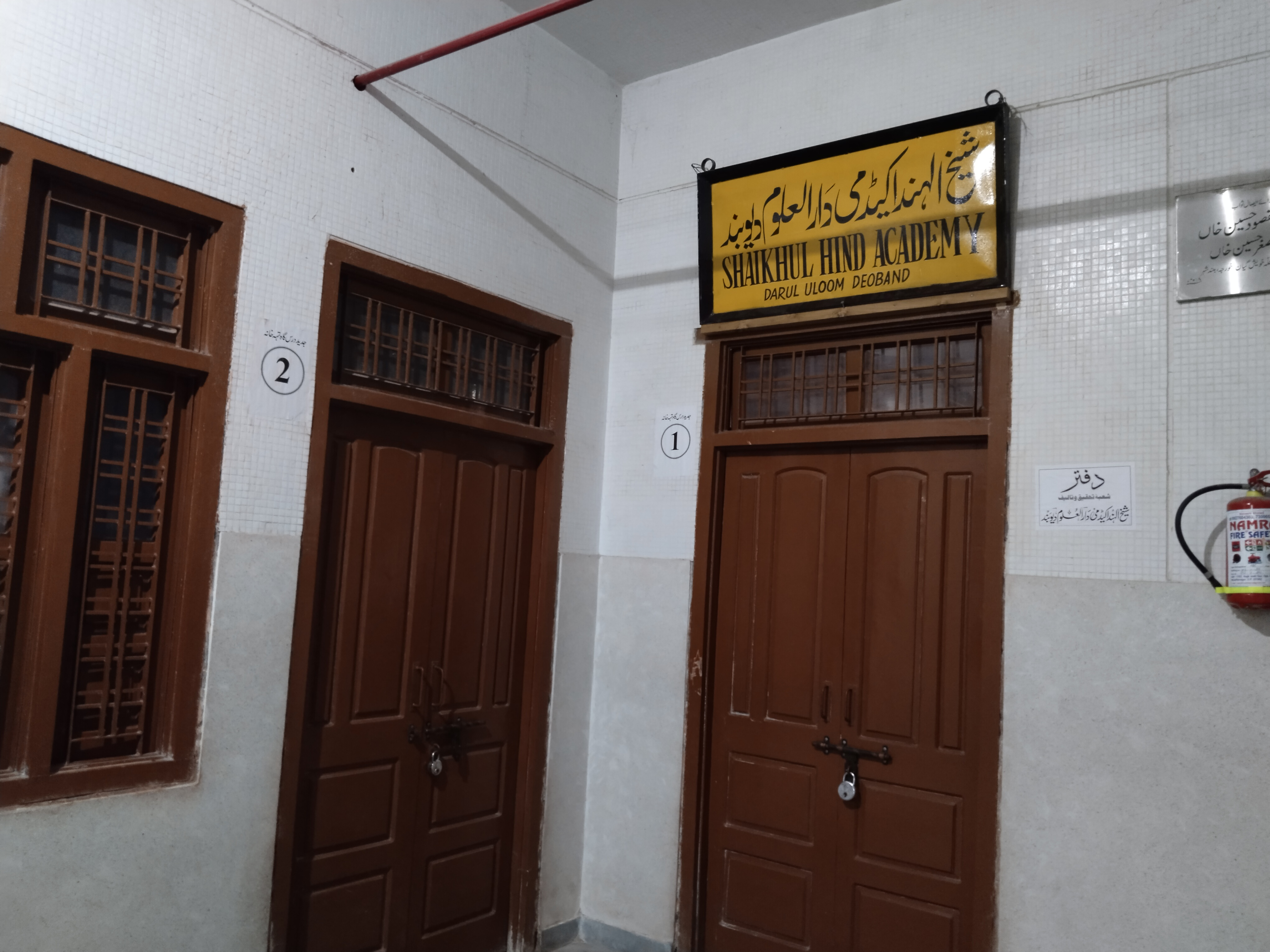
Shaikhul Hind Academy Office

== Encyclopedias ==
- Esposito, John L. (2003), "Deobandis", The Oxford Dictionary of Islam, Oxford University Press, ISBN 978-0-19-512558-0
- Metcalf, Barbara D. (2009), "Deobandīs", The Oxford Encyclopedia of the Islamic World, Oxford University Press, ISBN 978-0-19-530513-5
- Metcalf, Barbara D. (2014), "Deobandīs", The Oxford Encyclopedia of Islam and Politics, Oxford University Press, ISBN 978-0-19-973935-6
- Moosa, Ebrahim (2015), "Deobandīs in Africa", Encyclopaedia of Islam, THREE, Brill

== Books ==
- Abdul Alim, Muhammad (2022). Deoband Movement: A Poignant Chapter Against British Imperialism (in Bengali). West Bengal, India: New Lekha Publications.
- Adravī, Asīr (1994). Taz̲kirah-yi mashāhīr-i Hind: kārvān-i raftah (PDF) (in Urdu). India: Dārul Muallifin. OCLC 38024777.
- Arshad, ʻAbdurrashīd (2016). ʻUlamā-yi Dīivband va mashāhīr-i Hind (in Urdu). Turbat-i Jām: Shaykh al-islām Aḥmad Jām. ISBN 978-964-247-109-6. OCLC 1140223701.
- Arshadi, Muhammad Nouman (2018). Nigarishaat e Akabir [Writings by Akabir] (PDF) (in Urdu). India: Hujjat al-Islam Academy. ASIN B08WRB3MYZ.
- Bano, Masooda, ed. (2018), "Deobandi Madrasah Network", Modern Islamic Authority and Social Change, Volume 1: Evolving Debates in Muslim Majority Countries, Edinburgh University Press, pp. 193–194, ISBN 978-1-4744-3324-2
- Birt, Jonathan; Lewis, Philip (2010). "The pattern of Islamic reform in Britain: The Deobandis between intra-Muslim sectarianism and engagement with wider society". Producing Islamic Knowledge. Routledge. doi:10.4324/9780203846230. ISBN 978-0-203-84623-0.
- Bukhari, Akbar Shah (1987). Tahreek-e-pakistan Aur Ulama-e-deoband (PDF) (in Urdu). Karachi, Pakistan: Saeed Company.
- Bukhari, Akbar Shah (1999). Akabir-i-Ulama-i-Deoband (PDF) (in Urdu). Lahore, Pakistan: Idara Islamiah.
- Bukhari, Akbar Shah (2006). 50 Jaleel-ul-Qadr Ulama (PDF) (in Urdu). Urdu bazar, Lahore, Pakistan: Al Mizan.
- Bukhari, Akbar Shah. Tazkira Auliya-e-Deoband (PDF) (in Urdu). Pakistan: Maktaba Rahmaniya.
- Bukhari, Akbar Shah. 20 Ulama-i-Haq (PDF) (in Urdu). Urdu bazar, Lahore, Pakistan: Maqtaba Rahmania.
- Deobandi, Muhammad Miyan (1946). Ulama-e-haq Aur Unke Mujahidana Karname (in Urdu). Delhi, India: Wali Printing Works. OCLC 70629055.
- Deobandi, Muhammad Miyan (1992). Ulama-e-hind Ka Shandar Mazi (in Urdu). Karachi, Pakistan: Maktaba-e-Rashidiya. OCLC 32429310.
- Deobandi, Nawaz (2000). Sawaneh Ulama-e-Deoband (in Urdu). Deoband, India: Nawaz Publications. OCLC 46353208.
- Gujrān̲vālah, Ḥakīm. Maḥmūd; Mairaṭhī, Muḥammad Sulaimān (1997). Ulamāʼ-yi Devband kā māz̤ī tārīk̲h̲ ke āʼīne men̲ (in Urdu). Mairaṭh, India: Anṣārussunnah. OCLC 47225301.
- Fārūqī, Z̤iāʼulḥasan (1963). The Deoband School and the Demand for Pakistan. New Delhi: Asia Publishing House. ISBN 978-0-210-33835-3. OCLC 1079368232.
- Ḥaīdarābādī, ʻAbdullāh (1965). Ulamāʼ-yi Deoband aur Urdū adab (in Urdu). Deoband, UP, India: Maktabah-yi Majlis-i Qāsim al-maʻārif. OCLC 61647018.
- Hendrich, Béatrice (2018). "Ubaidullah Sindhi as a Revolutionary: A Study of Socialist Activism in Deobandi Islam". Muslims and Capitalism: An Uneasy Relationship?. Nomos Verlagsgesellschaft. pp. 151–170. doi:10.5771/9783956504648-151. ISBN 978-3-95650-463-1.
- Ingram, Brannon D. (2018). Revival from below: the Deoband movement and global Islam. Oakland, California: University of California Press. ISBN 978-0-520-29799-9. OCLC 1029805031.
- Kajee, Imraan (2018). The legacy of the Ulama of Deoband (PDF). South Africa: Spiritual Light.
- Kayum, Sajid Abdul. The JAMAAT TABLEEGH and Deobandis (PDF). IslamKotob. Archived from the original (PDF) on 30 October 2022.
- Marsden, Magnus (2013), "Out of India: Deobandi Islam, radicalism and the globalisation of 'South Asian Islam'", Routledge Handbook of the South Asian Diaspora, Routledge, doi:10.4324/9780203796528-21, ISBN 978-0-203-79652-8
- Metcalf, Barbara (1982). Islamic revival in British India: Deoband, 1860-1900. Princeton, New Jersey: Princeton University Press. ISBN 978-1-4008-5610-7. OCLC 889252131.
- Metcalf, Barbara D. (2002). 'Traditionalist' Islamic activism: Deoband, Tablighis, and Talibs. Leiden: ISIM. ISBN 90-804604-6-X. OCLC 67024546.
- Mirza, Asad (2024). Demystifying Madrasah And Deobandi Islam. New Delhi: Vitasta Publishing. ISBN 9788119670765.
- Moj, Muhammad (2015). The Deoband Madrassah Movement: Countercultural Trends and Tendencies. London: Anthem Press. ISBN 978-1-78308-390-9. OCLC 904404592.
- Muhammad Yahya, Abul Fatah (1998). Deoband Movement: History, Tradition and Contribution (PDF) (in Bengali). Bangladesh: Al-Amin Research Academy Bangladesh.
- Nadwi, Masood Azizi (2014). Tasawwuf And The Elders Of Deoband (PDF). Translated by Elias, A.H. Muzaffarabad, Saharanpur, (U. P) India: Research & Publication House, Markazu Ihyail Fikril Islami.
- Qāsmī, Ḥabīburraḥmān (1980). Ulmāʼ-i Devband aur ʻilm-i ḥadīs̲ (in Urdu). India: Daftar Ijlās-i Ṣad Sālah Dārulʻulūm. OCLC 1159401693.
- Rahman, Azizur (1967). Mashāʼik̲h̲-i Diyoband kī do ṣad sālah tārīk̲h̲: yaʻnī taz̲kirah-yi mashāʼ ik̲h̲-i Diyoband (in Urdu). Bajnūr, India: Idārah-yi madanī dār al-tālīf. OCLC 63852224.
- Rajih, Fadl (2023). Global Deobandis: Sufism, Ethics, Polemics. India. ISBN 978-5-365-26553-0.
- Ramsey, Charles M. (2017). "Anti-saint or Anti-shrine? Tracing Deoband's Disdain For The Sufi In Pakistan" (PDF). In Clinton Bennett; Sarwar Alam (eds.). Sufism, Pluralism and Democracy. Equinox Publishing Limited. pp. 103–122. ISBN 978-1-78179-220-9.
- Saʻd Shujāʻābādī, S̲anāʼullāh (2006). Ulama E Deoband Ke Akhiri Lamhat (in Urdu). New Delhi, India: Farīd Bukḍipo. OCLC 655298218.
- Saharanpuri, Khalil Ahmad (2004). Al-Kawthari, Muhammad ibn Adam (ed.). Al-Muhannad ala al-Mufannad [The Sword on the Disproved] (in Arabic). Jordon: Dar al-Fath. ISBN 978-9957-23-440-9.
- Singh, David Emmanuel (2012). Islamization in Modern South Asia: Deobandi Reform and the Gujjar Response. Religion and Society. De Gruyter. doi:10.1515/9781614511854. ISBN 978-1-61451-185-4.
- Syed, Jawad; Pio, Edwina; Kamran, Tahir; Zaidi, Abbas (2016). Faith-Based Violence and Deobandi Militancy in Pakistan. Springer. ISBN 978-1-349-94966-3.
- Tabassum, Farhat (2006). Deoband Ulema's movement for the freedom of India (PDF). New Delhi: Jamiat Ulema-e-Hind in association with Manak Publications. ISBN 81-7827-147-8. OCLC 71237755.
- Tayyab, Qari Muhammad (2021). Birt, Yahya (ed.). The Tradition of the Scholars of Deoband: Maslak Ulama-i-Deoband. Translated by Nakhuda, Ismaeel. UK: Turath Publishing. ASIN B09NL4K2TF.
- Us̲mānī, Fuẓailurraḥmán Hilāl (1993). Islām, Islāmī fikr aur maktabah-yi fikr Devband (in Urdu). Deoband, UP, India: Faiṣal Pablīkeshanz. ISBN 978-81-89857-24-0. OCLC 881517445.
- Zaman, Muhammad Qasim (2007). The Ulama in Contemporary Islam: Custodians of Change. Princeton studies in Muslim politics. Princeton, N.J.: Princeton University Press. ISBN 978-0-691-13070-5.
- Zaman, Muhammad Qasim (2010). "Tradition and Authority in Deobandi Madrasas of South Asia". In Robert W. Hefner; Zaman (eds.). Schooling Islam: The Culture and Politics of Modern Muslim Education. Princeton University Press. pp. 61–86. doi:10.1515/9781400837458.61. ISBN 978-1-4008-3745-8.
- al-Qasmi, Muhammad Rizwan; Rahmani, Khalid Saifullah, eds. (1991). Fiqh-e-Islami: Usul, Khidmat aur Taqaze [Islamic Jurisprudence: Principles, Services and Requirements] (in Urdu). Hyderabad, India: Darul Uloom Sabeel-us-Salam.

== Biographies ==
- Gīlānī, Sayyid Manāẓar Aḥsan (1980). Savāniḥ-i Qāsimī (in Urdu). Lāhaur, Pakistan: Makdtabah-yi Raḥmāniyah. OCLC 9894175.
- Madani, Hussain Ahmed (1953). Naqsh-e-Hayat (PDF) (in Urdu). Karachi, Pakistan: Darul Isa'at. LCCN 74930518. OCLC 644599813.
- Majz̲ūb, ʻAzīzulḥasan G̲h̲aurī (1994). Ashrafussavāniḥ (in Urdu). Idārah-yi Tālīfāt-i Ashrafiyyah. OCLC 253872123.
- Nadwi, Abul Hasan Ali Hasani (1983–1999). Karwan-e-Zindagi (in Urdu). India: Maktabah-yi Islām. ISBN 978-984-91840-0-3. OCLC 11755298.
- Zakariyyā, Muḥammad (2014). Aap beti: autobiography of Kutbul Aktaab Shaikhul Hadith Hazrat Maulana Muhammed Zakariyya Kandhlawi (Rahmatullah Alayhi). New Delhi, India: Idara Impex. ISBN 978-81-7101-248-0. OCLC 954195704.

== Theses ==
- Adamski, Michael J (2009). The evolution of the Deoband madrasa network and U.S. efforts to combat militant ideology (MA thesis). Washington, D.C.: Georgetown University. hdl:10822/553276.
- Ahmad, Ishtiaque (2020). Ulama E Deoband Ki Swaneh Umriyon Ka Tanqeedi Tajziya Azadi Se Qabl (PhD thesis) (in Urdu). India: Department of Urdu, Maulana Azad National Urdu University. hdl:10603/338413.
- Bashir, Aamir (2010). Shari'at and Tariqat: A Study of the Deobandi Understanding and Practice of Tasawwuf (PDF) (MA thesis). International Institute of Islamic Thought and Civilization, International Islamic University Malaysia. Archived from the original (PDF) on 16 January 2017.
- Bashir, Aamir (2022). Private Muftīs in a Postcolonial State: A Study of Legal Reasoning among Deobandī Ḥanafīs in Contemporary Pakistan (PhD thesis). The University of Chicago. doi:10.6082/uchicago.4737.
- Bette, J. (2011). Gezag en moderniteit binnen de Islam, Hervormingen van de Deoband ulama in Pakistan en Afghanistan (MA thesis) (in Dutch). Faculty of Humanities, Utrecht University.
- Chaudri, Zeeshan (2022). Demarcating the Contours of the Deobandi tradition via a study of the 'Akābirīn' (PhD thesis). SOAS University of London. doi:10.25501/soas.00037291.
- Dharwad, Abdul Khadar Nabi Sab (2006). Tehrike azadi mein Ulema e deoband ka hissa (PhD thesis) (in Urdu). India: Department of Urdu, Kuvempu University. hdl:10603/82148.
- Hamid, Myra (2005). The Political Struggles of the Ulama of Dar-ul-Uloom Deoband: Identifying and Operationalizing the Traditionalist Approach to Politics (MA thesis). University of Maryland, College Park.
- Hashmi, Arshi Saleem (2014). The Deobandi Madrassas in India and their elusion of Jihadi Politics: Lessons for Pakistan (PhD thesis). Pakistan: Quaid-i-Azam University.
- Haq, Waliul (2021). A Practical and Critical Analysis of the Scholarly Contributions of Deobandi Scholars in the Science of Theology (PhD thesis) (in Urdu). Pakistan: University of Peshawar.
- Ingram, Brannon D. (2011). Deobandis Abroad: Sufism, Ethics and Polemics in a Global Islamic Movement (PhD thesis). United States: University of North Carolina at Chapel Hill. doi:10.17615/vp8r-8f57.
- Jackson, William (2013). A Subcontinent's Sunni Schism: The Deobandi-Barelvi Rivalry and the Creation of Modern South Asia (PhD thesis). Syracuse, New York: Syracuse University. Archived from the original on 29 October 2022.
- Jan, Najeeb A. (2010). The Metacolonial State: Pakistan, the Deoband 'Ulama and the Biopolitics of Islam (PhD thesis). Ann Arbor, Michigan: University of Michigan. hdl:2027.42/75807.
- Jan, Samin (2019). Proliferation of Deobandi School of Thought in South Asia and its Impact on the Politics of Khyber Pakhtunkhwa, Pakistan (PhD thesis). Pakistan: University of Peshawar.
- Kamal, Razi Ahmad (2013). Akabirin e Deoband Ki Tasawwuf Mein Khidmat (PhD thesis). India: Department of Islamic Studies, Jamia Milia Islamia. hdl:10603/380751.
- Khan, Irfan Moeen (2004). The construction of Deobandī 'Ulamā's religious authority in Pakistan: a study of their journal, Bayyināt, 1962-1977 (MA thesis). Canada: McGill University. OCLC 316097486.
- Khan, Irfanullah (2018). The Deoband Movement and the Rise of Religious Militancy in Pakistan (PhD thesis). Pakistan: Quaid-i-Azam University.
- Mas'ūd, Muḥammad Khālid (1969). Trends in the interpretation of Islamic law as reflected in the Fatāwá literature of Deoband School: a study of the attitudes of the 'Ulamā' of Deoband to certain social problems and inventions (MA thesis). Canada: McGill University.
- Moosagie, Mohammed Allie (1995). Trends in the justificatory force of the Fatawa of the Deobandi mufti (PhD thesis). University of Cape Town.
- Muhammad Masharib, Syed (2016). Controversies between Deobandi and Barelwi schools in Pakistan depending on hadith (MA thesis) (in Turkish). Turkey: Dokuz Eylül University.
- Patel, Nafisa (2013). Islamic feminist reflection of pedagogy and gender praxis in South African madaris (MA thesis). South Africa: Department of Religious Studies, University of Cape Town.
- Perwez, Shahid (1999). The Deoband movement till 1920 the ideological and institutional dimensions (PhD thesis). India: Department of History, Aligarh Muslim University. hdl:10603/52429.
- Rahman, Hafijur (2023). Contribution Of Deobandi Ulama To The Promotion Of Indo Arab Literature An Analytical Study (PhD thesis) (in Arabic). India: Department of Arabic, Gauhati University. hdl:10603/508547.
- Rahman, Obaidur (2021). Contribution of Olamae of Deoband to Arabic Language and Literature from 1867 to 2013 (PhD). India: Department of Arabic, Banaras Hindu University. hdl:10603/536377.
- Raihan, Md. (2017). Contribution of Deoband Scholars to the Compilation of Arabic Lexicons An Analytical Study (PhD thesis) (in Urdu). India: School of Language Literature and Culture Studies, Jawaharlal Nehru University. hdl:10603/469846.
- Rashid, Misbah (2019). Women in Islamic Jurisprudence Analysing Select Fatwas of the Deoband School Since 1987 (PhD thesis) (in Urdu). India: School of Social Sciences, Jawaharlal Nehru University. hdl:10603/513627. Archived from the original on 24 October 2023.
- Ullah, Mohammed (2018). The Contribution of Deoband School to Hanafi Fiqh A Study of Its Response to Modern Issues and Challenges (PhD thesis). India: Centre for Federal Studies, Jamia Hamdard. pp. 105–106. hdl:10603/326073.

== Journals ==
- Akhtar, Muhammad Naveed; Khan, Nasir Ali; Mukhtar, Asia (2022). "Indian Muslim Theologians Response to British Colonization of India and Introduction of Modernization: A Study of Deoband School of Thought". Al-Duhaa. 3 (1): 90–103. doi:10.51665/al-duhaa.003.01.0161. ISSN 2710-0812. S2CID 251606316.
- Ahmed, Shoayb; Sukdaven, Maniraj (2021). "Application of themes from Al-Mawwaq's work in reforming the Deoband curriculum in Islamic education in the South African Darul Ulooms". HTS Theological Studies. 77 (4): 1–8. doi:10.4102/hts.v77i4.6673. hdl:2263/84498. ISSN 0259-9422. S2CID 244247379.
- Begum, Momotaj; Kabir, Humayun (2012). "Reflections on the Deobandi Reformist Agenda in a Female Quomi Madrasah in Bangladesh". South Asia: Journal of South Asian Studies. 35 (2): 353–380. doi:10.1080/00856401.2012.659650. ISSN 0085-6401. S2CID 145415848.
- Behuria, Ashok K. (2008). "Sects Within Sect: The Case of Deobandi–Barelvi Encounter in Pakistan". Strategic Analysis. 32 (1): 57–80. doi:10.1080/09700160801886330. ISSN 0970-0161. S2CID 153716247.
- Bennett-Jones, Owen; Hughes, R. Gerald (2018). "Islam in South Asia: the Deobandis and the current state of Pakistan". Intelligence and National Security. 33 (3): 459–465. doi:10.1080/02684527.2017.1414753. ISSN 0268-4527. S2CID 158268619.
- Durani, Abdul Gufur (2013). "Advent of Deobandi Thinking in India and Its Impact on Iranian Baluchistan". Journal of Subcontinent Researches (in Persian). 4: 7–26. doi:10.22111/jsr.2013.848 (inactive 11 July 2025).
- Gilliat-Ray, Sophie (2018). "From "Closed Worlds" to "Open Doors": (Now) Accessing Deobandi 'darul uloom' in Britain". Fieldwork in Religion. 13 (2): 127–150. doi:10.1558/firn.35029. ISSN 1743-0623. S2CID 149741819.
- Hameed, Fazal; Bibi, Hamida (2023). "Transformation in Political Approach of Deoband for Freedom Movement (1920-1947) and its Reasons". Journal of Social Sciences Review. 3 (1): 406–412. doi:10.54183/jssr.v3i1.170 (inactive 11 July 2025). ISSN 2789-4428.
- Haroon, Sana (2008). "The Rise of Deobandi Islam in the North-West Frontier Province and its Implications in Colonial India and Pakistan 1914–19961". Journal of the Royal Asiatic Society. 18 (1): 47–70. doi:10.1017/S1356186307007778. ISSN 1474-0591. S2CID 154959326.
- Hartung, Jan-Peter (2016). "The Praiseworthiness of Divine Beauty – The 'Shaykh al-Hind' Maḥmūd al-Ḥasan, social justice, and Deobandiyyat". South Asian History and Culture. 7 (4): 346–369. doi:10.1080/19472498.2016.1223719. ISSN 1947-2498. S2CID 152260682.
- Ingram, Brannon D. (2014). "The Portable Madrasa: Print, publics, and the authority of the Deobandi Ulama". Modern Asian Studies. 48 (4): 845–871. doi:10.1017/S0026749X13000097. ISSN 0026-749X. S2CID 146893021.
- Ingram, Brannon (2009). "Sufis, Scholars and Scapegoats: Rashīd Aḥmad Gangohī (d. 1905) and the Deobandi Critique of Sufism". The Muslim World. 99 (3): 478–501. doi:10.1111/j.1478-1913.2009.01281.x.
- Jones, J. (2022). "Remembrances of Rashid: life-histories as lessons in the Deoband movement". Journal of the Royal Asiatic Society. 33 (4). ISSN 1356-1863.
- Kabir, Humayun (2009). "Replicating the Deobandi model of Islamic schooling: the case of a Quomi madrasa in a district town of Bangladesh". Contemporary South Asia. 17 (4): 415–428. doi:10.1080/09584930903275884. ISSN 0958-4935. S2CID 145197781.
- Karimpanackal, Rafeeq (2018). "Deobandism and Aligarism: Responses of North Indian Muslim Scholars to Colonialism" (PDF). Research Guru. 11 (4): 590–596. ISSN 2349-266X.
- McDonald, Zahraa (2018). "Potentialities of faith-based organisations to integrate youths into society: The case of the Deobandi Islamic movement in South Africa". HTS Teologiese Studies / Theological Studies. 74 (3): 7. doi:10.4102/hts.v74i3.5062. ISSN 2072-8050. S2CID 150104781.
- Mian, Ali Altaf (2019). "Genres of Desire: The Erotic in Deobandi Islam". History of Religions. 59 (2): 108–145. doi:10.1086/704928. ISSN 0018-2710. S2CID 211645545.
- Mian, Ali Altaf (2017). "Troubling Technology: The Deobandi Debate on the Loudspeaker and Ritual Prayer". Islamic Law and Society. 24 (4): 355–383. doi:10.1163/15685195-00244P03. ISSN 0928-9380. JSTOR 26571282.
- Palanpuri, Saeed Ahmad (December 2021). "What is Deobandism?". At- Tawhid (in Bengali). Bangladesh: Al Jamia Al Islamia Patiya. Archived from the original on 1 November 2022.
- Pease, Joshua; Hess, James (2021). "The Convergence of Subsects: Defining Where Deobandi and Salafi Subsects Intersect". Global Security and Intelligence Studies. 6 (1). doi:10.18278/gsis.6.1.3. S2CID 244610067.
- Puri, Balraj (2009). "Deoband Ulema in Pakistan". Economic and Political Weekly. 44 (23): 4. ISSN 0012-9976. JSTOR 40279069.
- Reetz, Dietrich (2007). "The Deoband Universe: What Makes a Transcultural and Transnational Educational Movement of Islam?". Comparative Studies of South Asia, Africa and the Middle East. 27 (1): 139–159. doi:10.1215/1089201x-2006-049. ISSN 1548-226X. S2CID 143345615.
- Samiullah, Muhammad; Mushtaq, Saima (2021). "Historical Perspectives Of Muslim Insurgencies In Indian Subcontinent: Case Study Of Deoband Movement". Harf-o-Sukhan. 5 (3): 42–51. ISSN 2709-4030.
- Sajjad, Mohammad Waqas (2023). "Contesting the milad: Deobandis and Barelvis in British India and contemporary Pakistan". Contemporary South Asia. 31 (2): 207–221. doi:10.1080/09584935.2023.2180486. ISSN 0958-4935. S2CID 257418039.
- Sargana, Turab-ul-Hassan; Ahmed, Khalil; Rizvi, Shahid Hassan (2015). "The Role of Deobandi Ulema in Strengthening the Foundations of Indian Freedom Movement (1857-1924)" (PDF). Pakistan Journal of Islamic Research. 15 (1): 39–48. eISSN 2618-0820. Archived from the original (PDF) on 4 January 2022.
- Scott, Jamie S. (2021). "Postcolonial Islam in My Son the Fanatic: From Deobandi Revivalism to the Secular Transposition of the Sufi Imaginary". Humanities. 10 (1): 1. doi:10.3390/h10010001. ISSN 2076-0787.
- Shah, Syed Subtian Hussain (2018). "Religious Education And Extremism In Pakistan: From Deobandi Militancy To A Rising Sufi Fanaticism". Journal of Education Culture and Society. 9 (1): 11–26. doi:10.15503/jecs20181.11.26. ISSN 2081-1640. S2CID 55708709.
- Siddiqui, Atif Suhail (2020). "Theological and Intellectual Roots in Deobandi Thoughts: A Paradigm from Muhammad Qāsim Nānawtawī's Discourses with Special Reference to his Ḥujjat al-Islām". American Journal of Islam and Society. 37 (1–2): 41–66. doi:10.35632/ajis.v37i1-2.703. ISSN 2690-3741. S2CID 234749292.
- Sikand, Yoginder (2011). "Deobandi Patriarchy: A Partial Explanation". Economic and Political Weekly. 46 (19): 35–41. ISSN 0012-9976. JSTOR 41152370.
- Ullah, Irfan; Uddin, Sami (2019). "Traditionalist Trends in Pakistan's Ideology: Critiquing Deobandis, Tablighi Jamāt and the Taliban". Pakistan Studies. 10 (2): 204–223.
- Yilmaz, Fatih Mehmet (2021). "The Approach of Creed of Ahl al-Hadith and Deoband Schools Specific to Sunnah Section of Abu Davud –The Case of Azimabadi and Saharanfuri". Mevzu - Sosyal Bilimler Dergisi (in Turkish) (6): 119–164. doi:10.5281/zenodo.5506873. S2CID 244999180.
- Zaidi, S. Akbar (2009). "The Ulema, Deoband and the (Many) Talibans". Economic and Political Weekly. 44 (19): 10–11. ISSN 0012-9976. JSTOR 40279326.
- Qasmi, Muhammad Asad, ed. (July 1999 – June 2000). "Mu'āsir Fiqh-e-Islami Number". Quarterly Fikr-e-Islami (16–19). Basti, Uttar Pradesh: Markaz-e-Da'wat-o-Irshad, Darul Uloom al-Islamia.

== Newspapers ==
- Akram, Mubashir (5 September 2017). "Deobandis in South Asia". Daily Times. No. 1. Pakistan.
- Akram, Mubashir (11 September 2017). "Deobandis in South Asia". Daily Times. No. 2. Pakistan.
- Ayoob, Mohammed (3 October 2018). "False association: Pakistan's neo-Deobandis are defaming the school's foundational philosophy". The Hindu. India.
- Begam, Amana (2023). "Deobandis Arabising Indian Muslims in name of Islam". ThePrint.
- Bokhari, Kamran (23 November 2021). "The Long Shadow of Deobandism in South Asia". New Lines Magazine.
- Bokhari, Kamran (9 January 2022). "Cradle of Chaos: On the Deobandi sect". The New Indian Express.
- Inpaper Magazine (11 March 2012). "Past present: Resentment in response". Dawn. Pakistan.
- Nagri, Atiqur Rahman (12 August 2015). "Ulama-e Deoband: Our Expectations". The Daily Sangram (in Bengali). Bangladesh. Archived from the original on 15 January 2022.

== Seminars ==
- Qasmi, Muhammadullah Khalili (2016). Influence of Deoband School of Thought In South Africa. 2nd Congress On Islamic Civilisation In Southern Africa. South Africa: University of KwaZulu-Natal.

== Documentaries ==
- Bennett Jones, Owen (June 2016). "The Origins of the Deobandis, Part 1: India" (radio broadcast). BBC News.
- Bennett Jones, Owen (June 2016). "The Origins of the Deobandis, Part 2: Pakistan" (radio broadcast). BBC News.
- Bennett Jones, Owen (April 2016). "The Deobandis (in Britain), Part 1" (radio broadcast). BBC News.
- Bennett Jones, Owen (April 2016). "The Deobandis (in Britain), Part 2" (radio broadcast). BBC News.

== Websites ==
- "Deobandi Islam". GlobalSecurity.org.
- "Deoband Movement". Story Of Pakistan. 2003.
- Ibn Yusuf Mangera, Abdur Rahman (17 October 2021). "The Quest for Prophetic Equilibrium: The Revival Tradition of Deoband". The Muslim 500. Royal Islamic Strategic Studies Centre.

== Other ==
=== Theses ===
- Abdur Rahman, Khan (2016). Legislation problems of common jurisprudence in the presence of different jurisprudential schools in Pakistan and their solution (PhD). Pakistan: University of Karachi.
- Khan, Sohaib (2020). Translating Capital: Islamic Law and the Making of Sharī'a Compliance in Pakistan (PhD thesis). Columbia University. doi:10.7916/d8-hkre-3v69.
- Rasheed, Nighat (2007). A Critical Study of the Reformist Trends in the Indian Muslim Society During the Nineteenth Century (PhD thesis). Aligarh Muslim University. pp. 267–282. hdl:10603/52379.
- Yusuf, Aasia (2014). Islam and modernism: a study of Muslim scholars of Indo-Pak subcontinent (PhD thesis). Aligarh Muslim University. pp. 122–130.

=== Books ===
- Blecher, Joel (2017). Said the Prophet of God: Hadith Commentary across a Millennium. University of California Press. ISBN 978-0-520-96867-7.
- Dudoignon, Stéphane A. (2017). The Baluch, Sunnism and the State in Iran: From Tribal to Global. Oxford, New York: Oxford University Press. ISBN 978-0-19-065591-4.
- Jalal, Ayesha (2008). Partisans of Allah: jihad in South Asia. Cambridge, Massachusetts: Harvard University Press. ISBN 978-0-674-03907-0. OCLC 434586585.
- Reetz, Dietrich (2006). Islam in the Public Sphere: Religious Groups in India, 1900-1947. Oxford University Press. ISBN 978-0-19-566810-0.
- Zaman, Muhammad Qasim (2002). The ulama in contemporary Islam: custodians of change. Princeton, N.J.: Princeton University Press. ISBN 978-1-4008-3751-9. OCLC 730903701.
- Zaman, Muhammad Qasim (2012). Modern Islamic Thought in a Radical Age: Religious Authority and Internal Criticism. Cambridge: Cambridge University Press. ISBN 978-1-107-09645-5.

== See also ==
- Bibliography of Darul Uloom Deoband
- List of Deobandi organisations
- List of Deobandi madrasas
