= Amr ibn Umayya al-Damri =

Amr ibn Umayya al-Damri was a companion of the Islamic Prophet Muhammad. Amr ibn Umayya al-Damri was sent to assassinate Abu Sufyan.

== Military campaigns ==
He participated in The Mission of Amr bin Umayyah al-Damri in the year 627. Amr ibn Umayya al-Damri was sent to assassinate Abu Sufyan to avenge Khubyab bin Adi. According to the Muslim scholar Safiur Rahman Mubarakpuri, the Quraysh ordered Khubyab bin Adi to be crucified by Uqba bin al-Harith during the Expedition of Al Raji because he had killed Uqba bin al-Harith's father. Three polytheists were killed by Muslims and one was captured.

He was also one sent to investigate the events of the Expedition of Bir Maona. When the news of this massacre reached Muhammad, he was greatly grieved and sent Amr ibn Umayya al-Damri and an Ansar to investigate the whole matter. On his way back to Qarqara, Amr ibn Umayya rested in the shade of a tree, and there two men of Banu Kilab joined him. When they slept, Amr killed them both, thinking that by doing that he would avenge some of his killed companions.

Then he found out that they had been given a pledge of protection by Muhammad. He told Muhammad what he had done. Then Muhammad said to ‘Amr, that he (Muhammad) must pay a debt for the killing of those he pledged protection to (the Dhimmi's)

== Envoy ==
He was sent as an envoy to the king of Abyssinia (now Ethiopia) called Aṣḥama ibn Abjar to invite him to Islam.

== See also ==
- List of battles of Muhammad
