= What Is a Madrasa? =

2015 book by Ebrahim Moosa

- Official cover art
- Author: Ebrahim Moosa
- Language: English
- Publisher: University of North Carolina Press
- Publication date: April 2015
- Publication place: United States
- Pages: 304
- ISBN: 978-1-4696-2013-8
- Website: uncpress.org

What Is a Madrasa? is a book authored by Islamic scholar and intellectual Ebrahim Moosa. The book is a blend of autobiography, advocacy, ethnography, and history and gives an insider perspective of the Deobandi madrasas in the Indian subcontinent. It was published by University of North Carolina Press in April 2015.

== Overview ==
The book consists of four parts, and is a blend of autobiography, advocacy, ethnography, and history. The purpose of the book is to provide an insider perspective of the Deobandi madrasas in the Indian subcontinent.

Moosa has presented his six-year account of being in the madrasa system in the first part. The section concludes with examples about how the Hanafi legal precedent was used as a counterintuitive during the colonial period by senior Deobandi scholars such as Ashraf Ali Thanwi and Qasim Nanawtawi. The second part is titled History and Contexts, in which Moosa uses biographical approach towards reaching social, political and historical contexts that surround the formation of the madrasa network in India and Pakistan. It outlines the history of familial and theological differences that helped in the formation and development of the Ahl-i Hadith, Barelwi and the Deobandi schools.

Moosa "focuses on debates and practices regarding the categorization and substance of knowledge" in the third part of the book, which has been titled Politics of Knowledge. The part concludes with "unravelling the complexity of Islamic and modern epistemology." As contended by the author, Islamic epistemology is "entangled between modern binaries", and makes no explicit division in disciplines of knowledge.

The fourth part Madrasas in Global Context deals with addressing the negative image of madrasas created by media. Moosa concludes this part with two letters: one to the U.S. policymakers and the second to his former teachers at the madrasa. In the former letter, he argues for the suspension of drone program and other U.S. policies which are aimed at shaping Muslim societies and Islamic orthodoxies, and in the latter, he has urged to his teachers to make certain reforms in the madrasa system. This part is heavily critical of both the media narratives about madrasas, government policies concerning madrasas, and also "the decline in intellectual sophistication of madrasa culture, and the administrators within madrasas who are either unwilling or incapable of leading reform efforts."

== Reception ==
Sabith Khan, affiliated with California Lutheran University, praises it as a "scholarly and sensitive response," offering a thorough exploration of the enduring institution of madrasas. Maryam Kashani, associated with Washington University in St. Louis, commends the book for its contribution to understanding madrasas in India and Pakistan, providing a unique South Asian perspective on Islamic education. From Virginia Tech, Mohammed Pervaiz emphasizes the author's proficiency in comparing madrasa knowledge with modern studies, appreciating the book's articulation of the complex South Asian madrasa network. Mahan Mirza, a representative from the University of Notre Dame, acknowledges the author's lifelong study and activism, portraying the book as a product of a "friendly critic" approach.

== See also ==
- Bibliography of Deobandi movement
