= Ebrahim Moosa =

American academic

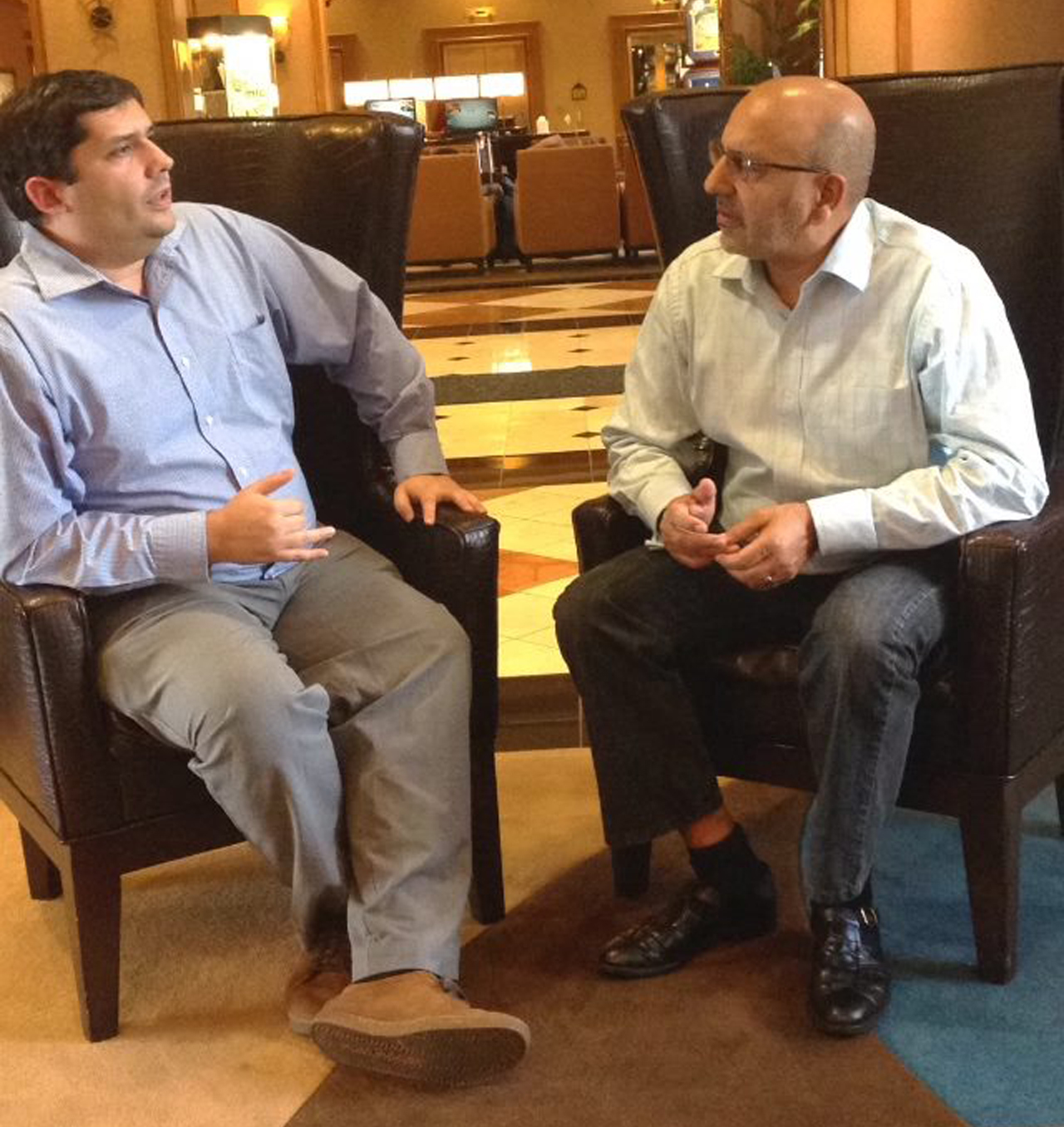
- Ebrahim Moosa (right)
- Born: 1957 (age 68–69); South Africa
- Occupation: Professor

Academic background
- Education: Darul Ulum Nadwatul Ulama, University of Cape Town

Academic work
- Institutions: University of Notre Dame
- Main interests: Islamic thought, Islamic ethics, religion and modernity
- Notable works: Ghazali and the Poetics of Imagination, What Is a Madrasa?

Ebrahim Moosa is the Mirza Family Professor of Islamic Thought & Muslim Societies at the University of Notre Dame with appointments in the Department of History and in the Kroc Institute for International Studies in the Keough School of Global Affairs. He is co-director of the Contending Modernities program at Notre Dame. He was previously Professor of Religion and Islamic Studies at Duke University. He is considered a leading scholar of contemporary Muslim thought. Moosa has been named as one of the top 500 Influential Muslims in the World.

== Life and career ==
Moosa completed his theological training in the early 1980s in India, graduating with specialization in the traditional Islamic sciences from Darul Ulum Nadwatul Ulama in Lucknow, India. His Ph.D. is from the University of Cape Town, where he taught until the late 1990s. He was visiting professor of Islamic studies at Stanford University from 1998 to 2001. From 2001 to 2014, he taught in the Religion department at Duke University. In the Fall of 2014 he moved to Notre Dame.

According to the contemporary scholar Adis Duderija, Moosa is "one of the most prominent intellectual theoreticians behind progressive Muslim thought." According to UCLA Professor Khaled Abou El Fadl, Moosa is "a formidable Muslim intellectual and scholar."

Moosa served as a professor of Religion and Islamic Studies at the Duke University. In 2007, he was invited to deliver his lecture, "Ethical Challenges in Contemporary Islamic Thought," in Morocco, which was attended by King Muhammad VI.

Moosa specializes in classical and medieval Muslim thought, Islamic ethics/law, and religion and modernity.

== Publications ==
Moosa has contributed articles to Middle East Law and Governance, Journal of the American Academy of Religion, Journal for Islamic and Near Eastern Law, The Journal of Law and Religion, Islamic Studies, History of Religions, Islamic Law and Society, and Der Islam, among others. He authored Ghazali and the Poetics of Imagination (UNC Press, 2005), which won the American Academy of Religion's Best First Book in the History of Religions Award in 2006. He authored What Is a Madrasa?, an introduction to madrasas in India and Pakistan, which according to Maryam Kashani, "contributes a South Asian perspective to the rich scholarship on Islamic education."

He edited and wrote the introduction to Fazlur Rahman's Revival and Reform in Islam: A Study of Islamic Fundamentalism (Oneworld, 1999), Islam in the Modern World (with Jeffrey Kenney; Routledge, 2013), and Muslim Family Law in Sub-Saharan Africa: Colonial Legacies and Post-colonial Challenges (with Shamil Jeppie and Richard Roberts; Amsterdam University Press, 2010).

Moosa co-edited Engaging the Madrasa: Education and Islamic Thought in a Changing World, a collection of essays examining contemporary challenges facing Muslim scholarly communities. The volume addresses themes including gender equality, colonial legacies, the nation-state, technological change, Islamic theology, and the relationship between tradition and modernity, with Joshua Lupo. The volume was published by University of Notre Dame Press in 2026.
