= Ghulam Yahya Anjum =

Indian academic and writer

- غلام یحییٰ انجم
- Occupations: Academic, author
- Employer(s): Jamia Hamdard, New Delhi

Academic background
- Education: Aligarh Muslim University; Jamia Ashrafia Mubarakpur (Dars-e-Nizami)

Ghulam Yahya Anjum (Urdu: غلام یحییٰ انجم) is an Indian academic and author associated with the Department of Islamic Studies, Jamia Hamdard, New Delhi. He has written on madrasah education, Sufism, and Qurʾānic studies, and his works have been the subject of book launches and literary award programmes.

== Biography ==
Ghulam Yahya Anjum was born in Uttar Pradesh, India (Siddharthnagar district). He completed the traditional Dars-e-Nizami at Jamia Ashrafia, Mubarakpur, and later obtained an MA, MPhil and PhD in Arabic from Aligarh Muslim University.

== Career ==
At Jamia Hamdard, Anjum has served as professor and head of the Department of Islamic Studies and serves as head of the department of Theology. He was noted for contributing to curriculum development for madrasahs in Uttar Pradesh, reported to include contemporary subjects alongside traditional Islamic studies. He has also presided over sessions in academic conferences, including the 2022 Jamia Hamdard seminar on Islam and pluralism, and webinars on Qurʾānic exegesis in South Asia.

In September 1999, at an international event on the 100th birth anniversary of Ayatollah Ruhollah Khomeini, Anjum was noted among the speakers. According to the Tehran Times, he remarked that Khomeini emphasized simple living and reliance on the people after God.

== Works ==
Anjum has authored numerous books in Urdu and Arabic. Selected examples include:

- Dini Madaris aur ʿAhd-e-Hazir ke Taqāzā (2004)
- Hindustan mein Silsila-e-Chishtiya: Aghaaz o Irtiqa (recognized by Delhi Urdu Academy)
- Safar-nama Iran (travelogue), launched at Jamia Hamdard with cultural events
- Quran-e-Karim ke Hindustani Tarajum wa Tafasir ka Jimali Jaiza (2017, published by National Council for Promotion of Urdu Language)
- Tadhkira Ulama-e-Basti
- Anwār-e-Khayāl
- Maulana Hashmat Ali Khan: Ek Tahqīqī Muatāl'aa
- Darul Uloom Deoband Ka Bānī Kaun?

== Recognition ==
Anjum's works have been acknowledged in Urdu Academy award programmes, and he has been covered in reports of literary prize distributions such as the 2024 Delhi Urdu Academy event. He has also spoken at seminars noting the role of Indian ʿulamāʾ in the independence movement, and at lectures on Sufism in India hosted by institutions in Iran. In 2018, he was a recipient of the President's Certificate of Honour awarded by the Government of India, in both Arabic and Persian.

In December 2021, he awarded for Quranic works by Iran Culture House, New Delhi. In 2021, he received the AMP 5th National Award for Excellence in Education in the category of Islamic Education (Arabic/Fiqh/Islamic Studies), conferred by the Association of Muslim Professionals (AMP).
