= Adari =

- Town
- Location in Uttar Pradesh, India
- Coordinates: 25°59′23″N 83°36′46″E
- Country: India
- State: Uttar Pradesh
- District: Mau

Population (2011)
  - Total: 13,717

Languages
  - Official: Hindi
- Time zone: UTC+5:30 (IST)
- PIN: 275102
- Vehicle registration: UP-54

Adari is a town and a nagar panchayat in the Mau district in the Indian state of Uttar Pradesh. Indara Junction Railway Station is the nearest railway station.

== Demographics ==
As of the 2001 India census, Adari had a population of 12,006. Males constitute 52% of the population and females 48%. Adari has an average literacy rate of 55%, lower than the national average of 59.5%; with 60% of the males and 40% of females literate. About 22% of the population is under 6 years of age.
