= Manikala =

Mani Kala is a village in Shahganj tehsil of Jaunpur district, Uttar Pradesh, India.

== Demographics ==
As of the 2011 Census of India, Mani Kalan had a population of 11,815 living in 1,505 households, of whom 6,162 were male and 5,653 were female. The sex ratio was 917 females per 1,000 males, and the literacy rate was 70.61%, higher than the Uttar Pradesh average of 67.68%. Scheduled Castes made up 15.88% of the population, and there was no Scheduled Tribe population.

== Notable people ==
- Majid Ali Jaunpuri (died 1935), Islamic scholar known for his work in hadith and logic, was born in the village.
