= Thomas R. Metcalf =

American historian (1934–2026)

Thomas R. Metcalf (May 31, 1934 – June 18, 2026) was an American historian of South Asia, especially colonial India, and of the British Empire. Metcalf was the Emeritus Sarah Kailath Professor of India Studies and professor of history at the University of California, Berkeley. He was the author of Imperial Connections: India in the Indian Ocean Arena, 1860-1920 (2008), A Concise History of Modern India (with Barbara Metcalf, 2006), Forging the Raj: Essays on British India in the Heyday of Empire (2005), Ideologies of the Raj (1997), and other books on the history of colonial India.

Metcalf was educated at Amherst College, the University of Cambridge and Harvard University. He completed his doctoral research at Harvard, with supervision from David Owen. His dissertation was written up for publication as a book, The aftermath of revolt: India, 1857-1870, published in 1964.

Metcalf was married to historian Barbara D. Metcalf, who survives him. Metcalf died June 18, 2026, at the age of 92.

== Selected bibliography ==
- Metcalf, Thomas R. (2008). Imperial Connections: India in the Indian Ocean Arena, 1860-1920. Berkeley, CA: University of California Press. ISBN 978-0-520-25805-1.
- Metcalf, Barbara; Metcalf, Thomas R. (2006). A Concise History of Modern India (Cambridge Concise Histories). Cambridge and New York: Cambridge University Press. ISBN 0-521-68225-8.
- Metcalf, Thomas R. (2005). Forging the Raj: Essays on British India in the Heyday of Empire. Oxford and New York: Oxford University Press. ISBN 0-19-566709-3.
- Metcalf, Thomas R. (1997). Ideologies of the Raj. The New Cambridge History of India. Cambridge: Cambridge University Press. ISBN 0-521-58937-1.
- Metcalf, Thomas R. (1991). The Aftermath of Revolt India, 1857-1870. Riverdale Co. ISBN 81-85054-99-1.
- Metcalf, Thomas R. (1989). An Imperial Vision: Indian Architecture and Britain's Raj. Berkeley and London: University of California Press. ISBN 0-520-06235-3.
- Metcalf, Thomas R. (1979). Land, Landlords, and the British Raj: Northern India in the Nineteenth Century. Berkeley and Los Angeles: University of California Press. ISBN 0-520-03575-5.
- Metcalf, Thomas R. (1964). The aftermath of revolt: India, 1857-1870. Princeton University Press. ISBN 978-1-4008-7664-8.
