= Shukrullah Mubarakpuri =

Indian Islamic Scholar

Mawlānā Shukrullah Mubarakpuri

Personal life
- Born: 1895 or 1896 Mohalla Pura Rani, Mubarakpur, Azamgarh, North-Western Provinces, British India
- Died: 23 March 1942 (aged 46–47) Mubarakpur, Azamgarh, United Provinces, British India
- Main interest(s): Logic, Philosophy
- Notable work: Madrasa Ehya al-Ulum
- Education: Darul Uloom Deoband

Religious life
- Religion: Islam
- Denomination: Sunni
- Jurisprudence: Hanafi
- Creed: Maturidi
- Movement: Deobandi

Muslim leader
- Influenced: Qazi Athar Mubarakpuri, Nizamuddin Asir Adrawi

Shukrullah Mubarakpuri (1895,1896 - 23 March 1942) was an Indian Sunni Islamic scholar. He was a leader and political activist in the Indian independence movement.

== Birth and education ==
Shukrullah Mubarakpuri was born in 1895 or 1896 in Pura Rani, Mubarakpur. His father, originally from Kopaganj had settled in Mubarakpur.

Mubarakpuri studied books of Arabic with Muhammad Mahmood Maroofi in Madrasa Ihya al-Ulum in Mubarakpur and later studied rational sciences in a Madrasa based in Laharpur, Sitapur. His teachers in that Madrasa were Hyder Hasan Shah and Fayzullah, from whom he studied Sharah Mutala, Tawzeeh Talweeh, Laaiq al-Mubin etc. He then studied rational sciences with Majid Ali Jaunpuri in Mendhu, Aligarh. He studied the books Mirqat, Tehzeeb, Sharah Tehzeeb Sharah Jaami, Mulla Hasan, Hadya Sadiya, al-Jawahir al-Galiyah, Maybzi, Hamdullah and Qazi Mubarak from Majid Ali Jaunpuri. He then left for the Darul Uloom Deoband, where he studied under Anwar Shah Kashmiri, Shabbir Ahmad Usmani, Mian Syed Asghar Hussain Deobandi and Hafiz Muhammad Ahmad. He graduated in 1336 AH.

== Career ==
Hakeem Elahi Bakhsh appointed Shukrullah Mubarakpuri as Chancellor of the Madrasa Ihya al-Ulum, Mubarakpur in 1918 (1336 AH). Shukrullah Mubarakpuri participated in the Khilafat Movement and was also jailed for six months in 1923 for his Satyagraha activities against British colonialism. He supervised the construction of Jama Mosque in Mubarakpur. Its foundation was laid on 1 June 1940. He also supervised the construction of the Eidgah, which was completed by 1357 AH. He mostly taught books on rational sciences. He was known for debates with Shias and Barelvis. He was also a Mufti. His rulings, if collected would fill volumes.

== Students ==
His students include:

- Athar Mubarakpuri, Islamic author and historian.
- Nizamuddin Asir Adrawi, Islamic author and scholar.
- Nizamuddin Azmi, former Grand Mufti Darul Uloom Deoband.
- Abdul Jabbar Maroofi, former Shaykh al-Hadith Jamia Qasmia Madrasa Shahi, Moradabad.
- Abdul Bari Azmi, former chancellor Madrasa Ehya al-Ulum, Mubarakpur.
- Abdus Sattar Maroofi, former Shaykh al-Hadith Nadwatul Ulama, Lucknow.

== Death ==
Mubarakpuri died on 23 March 1942 (5 Rabi' al-awwal 1361 AH) at the time of Duhaprayer (optional prayer in the morning, also known as Chasht in Urdu).
