= Nizamuddin Asir Adrawi =

Indian historian (1926–2021)

Mawlānā Nizāmuddīn Asīr Adrawi

Personal life
- Born: 1926 Adari, United Provinces, British India
- Died: 20 May 2021 (aged 94–95) Adari, Uttar Pradesh, India
- Region: India
- Main interest: History
- Notable works: Tarikh Jamiat Ulema-e-Hind; Tehreek-e-Azadi aur Musalman; Karwan-e-Rafta
- Education: Jamia Miftahul Uloom; Madrasa Shahi

Religious life
- Religion: Islam
- Denomination: Sunni
- Founder of: Madrassa Darus Salam, Adri
- Jurisprudence: Hanafi
- Movement: Deobandi

Senior posting
- Influenced by: Syed Fakhruddin Ahmad, Muhammad Miyan Deobandi, Hussain Ahmad Madani, Habib al-Rahman al-A'zami

Nizāmuddīn Asīr Adrawi (also known as Asīr Adrawi; 1926 – 20 May 2021) was an Indian Sunni Muslim scholar, biographer, historian and author in the Urdu language. He established the Madrassa Darus Salam in Adari and served as the Officer In Charge of the Jamiat Ulama-e-Hind in Lucknow from 1974 to 1978.

Asīr was an alumnus of the Jamia Miftahul Uloom, Madrassa Ehya-ul-Uloom and the Madrasa Shahi. He taught Islamic sciences at the Madrasa Jamia Islamia in Rewri Talab, Varanasi. His works include the Maʼās̲ir-i Shaik̲h̲ulislām, Tafāsīr mai Isrā'īli Riwāyāt and the biographies of Hussain Ahmad Madani, Imamuddin Punjabi, Muhammad Qasim Nanautawi, Mahmud Hasan Deobandi and Rashid Ahmad Gangohi.

== Biography ==
Nizamuddin Asir Adrawi was born in 1926 in Adari, Mau, then in the United Provinces of British India. He was schooled at the Madrasa Faydh al-Ghuraba in Adari, and then at the Jamia Miftahul Uloom where he studied with Habib Al-Rahman Al-Azmi, Munshi Zahīr-ul-Haq Nishāt Simābi and Abdul Latīf Nomāni. He then went to the Madrassa Ehya-ul-Uloom in Mubarakpur, where he studied with scholars such as Shukrullah Mubarakpuri. He then moved to Darul Uloom Mau where he studied the Mishkat with Abdur Rasheed al-Hussayni and the Jalalayn with Qari Riyasat Ali. He applied for admission to the Darul Uloom Deoband but was unsuccessful and thus went to the Madrasa Shahi for higher studies and graduated in 1942. He studied the Sahih Bukhari with Syed Fakhruddin Ahmad, the Sahih Muslim with Ismail Sambhali and the works of Tirmidhi with Muhammad Miyan Deobandi.

Asīr participated in the Quit India Movement. He was associated with the Indian National Congress until 1948, when he joined the Congress Socialist Party. He established the Madrassa Darus Salam in Adari, Mau in 1954, and taught there for around sixteen years. He served as the Officer In Charge of the Jamiat Ulama-e-Hind, Uttar Pradesh in Lucknow from 1974 to 1978 and thereafter taught Islamic Sciences at the Madrasa Jamia Islamia in Rewri Talab, Varanasi from 4 February 1978 till he was bedridden due to old age.

Asīr was the editor of the 3 monthly Tarjumān and wrote hundreds of articles for it. He was a columnist and a writer for the Weekly Al-Jamiat and Daily al-Jamiat of the Jamiat Ulama-e-Hind. He wrote short stories and legends including the Itnā, Do LāsheiN, Nashīb-o-Farāz and Aetirāf-e-Shikast. His legends such as the Hand bag and Aspatāl were published by the Nawai Pakistan of Lahore. He also contributed to the Kāmyāb, Delhi and the Risālā Dārul Uloom of the Darul Uloom Deoband. Several of his works have been considered primary sources for various Darul Uloom Deoband related issues.

Asīr died on 20 May 2021 in Adari, Mau, Uttar Pradesh. Arshad Madani expressed grief at his death and said that "Asīr Adrawi's death is an irreparable loss."

== Literary works ==
Asīr wrote biographies of the Islamic theologians Muhammad Qasim Nanautavi, Mahmud Hasan Deobandi, Imamuddin Punjabi, Rahmatullah Kairanawi, Rashid Ahmad Gangohi and Hussain Ahmad Madani. He abridged the four-volume Tarīkh-e-Islām (transl. History of Islam) by Muinuddin Ahmad Nadwi into four thin volumes. His book, the Taḥrīk-i āzādī aur Musalmān (transl. The Independence Movement and the Muslims) is part of the curricula of the Darul Uloom Deoband and several other affiliated madrasas. His other books include:

- Afkār-e-Aalam (transl. Thoughts on the World)
- Dabistān-i Devband kī ʻilmī k̲h̲idmāt (transl. Academic Services of the Deoband School)
- Dārulʻulūm Devband, iḥyā-yi Islām kī ʻaẓīm taḥrīk (transl. Darul-ulum Deoband, a magnificent movement of Islamic revival)
- Fun asma-ur-Rijal (transl. Techniques for writing biographies and critiques on the narrators of the Hadiths)
- Maʼās̲ir-i Shaik̲h̲ulislām (transl. Life and Times of Shaykh al-Islam, the biography of Hussain Ahmed Madani)
- Tafāsīr mai Isrā'īli Riwāyāt (transl. Jewish Traditions in Quranic Exegeses)
- Tārīkh Jamiat Ulema-e-Hind (transl. The History of the Jamiat Ulema-e-Hind)
- Tārīkh-e-Tabri ka tehqīqi jayzah (transl. A Methodical Survey of Al-Tabari's Histories)
- Urdu sharah Dīvān-i Mutanabbī (transl. An Urdu Explanation of Al-Mutanabbi's Diwan)

== See also ==
- List of Deobandis
