= Indara Junction railway station =

Railway station in Uttar Pradesh, India

Indara Junction Railway Station

General information
- Location: Mau-Majhwara Rd, Tehsil-Maunath Bhanjan, District Deoria; India
- Coordinates: 20.1439°N 85.1151°E
- Elevation: 84 metres (276 ft)
- System: Passenger train station
- Owner: Indian Railways
- Operator: North Eastern Railway Zone
- Line: Indara-Dohrighat Line Mau - Indara line Indara - Bhatni line Indara - Phephana Line
- Platforms: 6
- Tracks: 7
- Connections: Auto stand

Construction
- Structure type: Standard (on-ground station)
- Parking: Yes
- Cycle facilities: Yes

Other information
- Status: Functioning
- Station code: IAA
- Zone(s): North Eastern Railway Zone
- Division(s): Varanasi

History
- Opened: 20 November 2022; 3 years ago

Services
Preceding station	Indian Railways	Following station
Terminus	North Eastern Railway zone Indara - Dohrighat line Mau - Indara line Indara - Bhatni line Indara - Phephana Line	Terminus
Location
- Location within Uttar Pradesh Location within India

Indara Junction Railway Station is the main railway station in Mau district, Uttar Pradesh. Its code is IAA. It serves Indara City. The station consists of four platforms.

In July 2024, an amount of Rs 48.98 crore was sanctioned to develop the station under Amrit Station Scheme.
