= Ar-Raheeq Al-Makhtum =

1976 Seerah book written by Safiur Rahman Mubarakpuri

Ar-Raheeq Al-Makhtum الرحيق المختوم
- Author: Safiur Rahman Mubarakpuri
- Audio read by: www.audible.com
- Language: Arabic (Original language); Urdu (Original language)
- Subject: Seerah
- Genre: Biography
- Published: 1976
- Publisher: Darussalam Publishers
- Publication place: Saudi Arabia
- Media type: Paperback
- Awards: Muslim World League (in 1976; first grand prize money of SR 50,000; est. ₹9,82,545.26)
- ISBN: 978-1-59144-070-3

Ar-Raheeq Al-Makhtum (Arabic: الرحيق المختوم; transl. The Sealed Nectar) is a seerah book (biography of Prophet Muhammad) by Safiur Rahman Mubarakpuri. It was awarded first prize by the Muslim World League in a worldwide competition of biographies of Prophet Muhammad held in Mecca in 1979. The title of the book means "The Sealed Nectar", a reference to verse 25 of Surah 83 (Mutaffifin) of the Quran. The book has been highly popular in the Muslim world.

== History ==
Following in the year 1396 AH (approx. 1976 AD), Rabita organized a book writing competition on Islamic Seerat-Un-Nabi. Many writers from different countries participated in this global competition with interest. Out of 171 manuscripts, the book 'Ar-Raheeq Al-Makhtum' won the first prize.

In writing the book, the author has given a series of historical events and in describing them he has arranged the titles of different chapters in chronological order. In cases where there are differences of opinion in different texts, the author reviews everything and mentions what he thinks is correct. In cases where the author does not find the information of dissenters to be correct, he gives an indication of the evidence. Again, the author mentions the names and page numbers of numerous books in the book as a source of information.

At the beginning of the book, the author mentions various conditions and situations that existed in the world before the advent of hazrat Muhammad mustafa Rasoolullaah (sallallaahu alaihi wasallam). Through the geographical identity of Arabia, the position of different nations at that time, the leadership, and governance of Arabia, the religious beliefs and doctrines of the Arabs, and the characteristics, economic and social conditions of Pre-Islamic Arabia, the author has highlighted the importance and significance of Muhammad's appearance.

The various strategies and stages of hazrat Muhammad mustafa Rasoolullaah (sallallaahu alaihi wasallam)'s Dawah are described, including various battles including Badr, Uhud, the Conquest of Mecca, the Farewell Hajj, and all the historical events leading up to hazrat Muhammad mustafa Rasoolullaah (sallallaahu alaihi wasallam)'s death.

This biography chronicles the events of hazrat Muhammad mustafa Rasoolullaah (sallallaahu alaihi wasallam)'s life at different stages. The editing was done under the supervision of The Quran Publishing and Printing, a Riyadh-based company. Twenty-one editions of the book have been published in fifteen years, including the second edition of the book in just fifty-five days. Tauhid Publications later published a translation of the book. Translated from this publication by Abdul Khaleq Rahmani. Although the original book is about 600 pages, the Bengali translation has 530 pages.

== Published editions ==
=== English ===
- Ar-Raheeq Al-Makhtum (Arabic: الرحيق المختوم; transl. The Sealed Nectar. Dar-us-Salam Publications, P. O. Box 22743, Riyadh 11416. Tel: 4033962, Fax: 4021659. Kingdom of Saudi Arabia.online link

== Reception ==
The book has been highly popular in the Muslim world.

== See also ==
- The Holy Qur'an: Text, Translation and Commentary
- Al-Khasa'is al-Kubra
- Siyer-i Nebi
