= Imamuddin Punjabi =

Indian Islamic scholar

Imāmuddīn Punjabi

Personal life
- Born: Batala
- Died: 1916 Mau, United Provinces of Agra and Oudh, British India
- Education: Darul Uloom Deoband

Religious life
- Religion: Islam
- Denomination: Sunni
- Founder of: Jamia Miftahul Uloom

Abu al-Fadhl Imāmuddīn Khān Barāwli Chhachhrī (commonly known as Imamuddin Punjabi) (died 1916) was an Indian Sunni Muslim scholar who established the Jamia Miftahul Uloom.

== Biography ==
Imāmuddīn Punjabi's predecessors hailed from the area of Brawl, Bajaur. They had relocated to Chhachh, and then finally settled in the Kāla Noor area of Batala in Punjab.

Imamuddin was born in Batala, a city now in the Indian state of Punjab. He studied ahādith with Ahmad Ali Saharanpuri and graduated in the traditional dars-e-nizami from Darul Uloom Deoband. After completing his studies from the Deoband seminary, he pledged allegiance to Fazle Rahmān Ganj Murādābādi in Sufism.

Imamuddin moved to Maunath Bhanjan in 1298 AH. He established Jamia Miftahul Uloom, a known seminary in the Indian state of Uttar Pradesh. He died in 1916 in Mau in the United Provinces of Agra and Oudh.

== Literary works ==
Books include:

- al-Balāgh al-Mubīn
- Tab'yīn al-Kalām fi daf' il-Khisām
- Masābīh al-Itlā ala al-Tahrīm al-Tawājud wa al-Simā
- Rabī al-Anwār
- Eīdayn ki namāz ka waqt

== See also ==
- List of Deobandis
