= Qazi Athar Mubarakpuri =

Indian Islamic scholar, author and historian (1916–1996)

Muarrikh-e-Islam, Muhsin-e-Hind Athar Mubarakpuri
- Mubarakpuri with Indian President Zail Singh.

Personal life
- Born: 7 May 1916 Mubarakpur, Azamgarh
- Died: 14 July 1996 (aged 80) Mubarakpur, India
- Children: Khalid Hafiz
- Education: Jamia Qasmia Madrasa Shahi, Moradabad

Religious life
- Religion: Islam

Qazi Athar Mubarakpuri (7 May 1916 – 14 July 1996) was an Indian Sunni Islamic scholar, author and historian. He was honoured with the title of Muhsin-e-Hind by Pakistani scholars.

== Biography ==
Mubarakpuri was born on 7 May 1916 in Mubarakpur, Azamgarh. He graduated in dars-e-nizami from Madrasa Ehya-ul-Uloom and moved to Madrasa Shahi, Moradabad to study ahadith. In Shahi, he studied Sahih Bukhari with Syed Fakhruddin Ahmad, Sahih Muslim with Ismail Sambhali, and Jami' al-Tirmidhi with Muhammad Miyan Deobandi.

Mubarakpuri died on 14 July 1996. His funeral prayer was led by Abul Qasim Nomani.

== Literary works ==
Mubarakpuri wrote books on the relation of Indians and Arabs. In this series his books include Arb-o-Hind Ahd-e-Risalat Mai, Khilafat-e-Rashida awr Hindustan, Khilafat Amwiyyah awr Hindustan, Khilafat Abbasiyah awr Hindustan and Hindustan mai Arbon ki hukumatein.

== Legacy ==
- Contribution Of Qazi Athar Mubarakpuri to Arabic Studies : A Critical Study - PhD thesis from Aligarh Muslim University by Mohd Amirul Hasan.
- His son Khalid Hafiz (1938–1999), Imam of Wellington, served as the senior religious advisor to the New Zealand Muslim community from 1982 to 1999.

== See also ==
- List of Indian writers
