= Barbara D. Metcalf =

American historian

Barbara Daly Metcalf
- Title: Professor Emeritus
- Spouse: Thomas R. Metcalf
- Awards: Sir Syed Excellence Award (2022)

Academic background
- Education: University of California, Berkeley

Academic work
- Main interests: Indian History
- Notable works: Islamic Revival in British India; Husain Ahmad Madani: The Jihad for Islam and India's Freedom; Perfecting Women

Barbara Daly Metcalf (born September 13, 1941) is a professor emeritus of history at the University of California, Davis. She is a specialist in the history of South Asia, especially the colonial period, and the history of the Muslim population of India and Pakistan. She previously served as the dean of the College of Letters and Science at the University of California, Davis, and as the Alice Freeman Palmer Professor of History at the University of Michigan (2003–2009). She was the president of the Association for Asian Studies in 1994 and the president of the American Historical Association in 2010–11.

== Biography ==
Barbara Metcalf received her Ph.D. from the University of California, Berkeley, in 1974. Her doctoral dissertation focused on the history of the Muslim religious scholars (ulama) of Deoband, a reformist religious seminary in northern India founded in the 1860s.

Metcalf was called on to write to the Administrative Review Boards held at the Guantanamo Bay detainment camps. The Boards were authorized to recommend whether Guantanamo captives should continue to be held in extrajudicial detention. One of the justifications offered for the continued detention of over three dozen of the Guantanamo captives was that they had participated in the activities of a Pakistani chapter of the Islamic missionary group named Tablighi Jamaat.

Metcalf addressed the benevolent nature of Tablighi pilgrimages. She wrote:

“I will also attempt to explain why it is implausible to believe that the Tablighis support terrorism or are in any way affiliated with other terrorist or ‘jihadi’ movements such as the Taliban or Al Qaeda.”

She was married to Thomas R. Metcalf (d. 2026), also a historian of South Asia, and collaborated with him on a textbook history of India.

== Selected bibliography ==
- Islamic Revival in British India: Deoband, 1860–1900, Princeton University Press, 1982. ISBN 978-0-691-61413-7 (2nd edition 2002)
- Perfecting Women: Maulana Ashraf 'Ali Thanawi's Bihishti Zewar (translation, annotation, and introduction). University of California Press, 1992. ISBN 978-0-520-08093-5
- Making Muslim Space in North America and Europe, 1996 ISBN 978-0-520-20404-1
- A Concise History of India (with Thomas R. Metcalf), 2002 ISBN 978-0-521-63974-3
- Islamic Contestations: Essays on Muslims in India and Pakistan, 2004 ISBN 978-0-19-566666-3
- Husain Ahmad Madani: The Jihad for Islam and India's Freedom. Oneworld, 2009. ISBN 978-1-78-074210-6
- Essay, "'Traditionalist' Islamic Activism: Deoband, Tablighis, and Talibs," ca. 2001
