= Safi al-Rahman al-Mubarakpuri =

Indian Islamic scholar, teacher and writer (1942–2006)

Personal life
- Born: 6 June 1942 Mubarakpur, United Provinces, British India
- Died: 1 December 2006 (aged 64) Mubarakpur, India
- Notable work: Ar-Raheeq Al-Makhtum
- Education: Madrasah Arabiyah Dar At-Ta’leem (1948); Madrasah Ihya Al-Ulum (1954); Jamia Islamia Faiz-e-Aam (1956)
- Occupation: Writer; Author

Religious life
- Religion: Islam
- Jurisprudence: [[Non-denominational Muslim#Ahle Hadees|]]
- Movement: Salafism

Muslim leader
- Awards: Muslim World League (in 1976; first grand prize of SR 50,000)

Safi al-Rahman al-Mubarakpuri (6 June 1942 – 1 December 2006) was an Indian Islamic scholar, teacher, and writer affiliated with the Salafi movement. He is best known for his biography of the Islamic prophet Muhammad, Ar-Raheeq Al-Makhtum (The Sealed Nectar), which won a prize at the 1978 Muslim World League-sponsored Islamic conference on Prophetic biography (seerah) in Mecca.

== Biography ==
=== Early life ===
Mubarakpuri was born in 1942 in Husainabad, a village near Mubarakpur in the Azamgarh district of Uttar Pradesh, India.

=== Educational background ===
Mubarakpuri began his studies at home with the Quran under the tutelage of his grandfather and uncle. He then began studies in Arabic and Persian after getting admission in Madrasa Arabia Dar-ut-Taleem. He later moved to Madrasah Ihyaaul Uloom in Mubarakpur after being admitted there in 1954. Two years later in 1956, he joined Madrasa Faiz-e-Aam Maunath Bhanjan (Mau district) for further studies. Upon completion of his seven years of studies, he acquired the Fadilat degree and passed multiple exams to receive the Maulvi and Alim Certification. Mubarakpuri taught for the next 28 years in various universities, madrasas, and schools in India until he was offered a position at the Islamic University of Al Madinah al-Munawarah. During his teaching period, he wrote and compiled about seventeen books in Urdu and Arabic languages. He also said that when the monthly Urdu Magazine Muhaddith of Jamiah Salafiyah was published in 1980, he was appointed as Chief Editor of the Magazine section up to September in 1988, until he joined the Islamic University at al-Madinah. He served several years at the Islamic University of Madinah.

=== Career ===
After completing his studies at the Jamia Islamia Faiz-e-Aam in 1961, he began to teaching, preaching and delivering sermons. However, unfavorable circumstances did not permit him to stay in one place for long. In March 1963, he joined the Jamia Islamia Faiz-e-Aam as a teacher. Then he was transferred to the Al-Jamiatul Asaria Darul Hadees in the same city in February 1966.

In January 1969, he was appointed as the Principal at the Madrasa Faizul Oloom at Seoni (M.P.), India. According to his autobiography, after four years in 1972 he was requested to serve in his native Institute Madrasa Arabia Darul-Taleem as Principal. After spending two years, he was invited by Jamia Salafia, Varanasi to join as a Professor. He was appointed in Shawwal 1394 A.H. (October 1974), working in various academic departments till Dhul-Hijjah 1408 A.H. (July 1988).

A research institute was established in 1408 Hijrah at the Islamic University of Al-Madinah known as The Center for the Services of the Prophet’s Biography. He was selected to work there and was entrusted the duty of preparing an encyclopedia on the subject of the life history of Muhammad, as a research scholar.

His book Ar-Raheeq Al-Makhtum was honored by the first Islamic conference on seerah Muslim World League as first prize winner book took place in 1978. 1,182 manuscripts were received from all over the world. Out of these, 183 were shortlisted. Mubarakpuri received first prize and the award of SR 50,000

==== Timeline of his career ====
After graduating in 1961 from “Madrasah Faidh e Aam”, Safiur Rahman taught in many Madaris:

- From 1961 to 1963: He taught in the village Nagpur in the area of Ilahabad.
- From 1963 to 1965: He became teacher in his motherly Madrasah Faydh e Aam’.
- In 1965: He taught in “Jamiyah Ar-Rashad” in A’zamgarh.
- From 1966 to 1969: He taught in “Madrasah Dar Al-Hadith Mau’, and he was Naib Sadr Mudaris (vice head teacher) there.
- From 1969 to End 1972: He taught in the “Madrasah Faydh Al-Ulum’ Seyuni which was located 700 km from Maunath Bhanjan in Madhiyah Pardesh. He taught there for 4 years and he was Sadr Mudaris (as a Head teacher).
- End of 1972 to 1974: The head of “Madrasah Dar At-Ta’leem” in Mubarakpur, which was Mubarakpuri’s first Madrasah, insisted on him to be teacher there and he accepted.
- 1974 to 1988: Mubarakpuri taught in Jamiyah Salafiyah Banaris, the Markazi Ahl e Hadith University in India.
- 1988 to 1997: Mubarakpuri was a research scholar for “Markaz Khidmah As-Sunnah wa As-Seerah” which was part of Madina University, and he worked there up to December 1997.
- 1998 until his death: Mubarakpuri moved to Riyadh and worked as a research scholar for Maktabah Darussalam established by AbdulMalik Mujahid.

=== Death ===
Mubrakpuri died on 1 December 2006 (Zul Qi’dah 1427) on a Friday after a long disease in his house in Husaynabad.

== Books and compilations ==
=== Books in Arabic ===
- "Ar-Raheeq Al-Makhtum”: The book of Sīrah which won the competition of the Muslim World League for the best biography.
- “Rawdah Al-Anwar fi Seerah An-Nabi Al-Mukhtar”: A shorter book on the Sīrah, published by Darussalam.
- “Ittihaf Al-Kiram”: An explanation of “Bulugh Al-Maram” published by Darussalam.
- “Minnah Al-Mun’im Sharh Sahih Muslim”: An Arabic explanation of Sahih Muslim in 4 volumes published by Darussalam.
- “Bahjah An-Nazar”: A small booklet on Usul Al-Hadith
- “Ibraz Al-Haqq wa Sawab fi Masalah As-Sufur wal Hijab”: on the veil.
- “Al-Ahzab As-Siyasiyah fil Islam”: A book on political parties in Islam.
- “At-Tatawur Ash-Shu’ub wa Diyanat fil Hind wa Majal Ad-Da’wah fiha”: On the different religions in India and the opportunities of Da’wah in India.
- “Al-Firqah An-Najiyah wal Furuq Al-Islamiyah Al-Ukhra”.
- “Sharh Azhaar Al-Arab”: An explanation of the book of “Azhaar Al-Arab” of Muhammad Surti.
- “Al-Basharat bi Muhammad (saw) fi Kutub Al-Hunud wal Budiyin”: On the predictions of Muhammad in the books of the Hindus and Buddhists.

=== His Urdu books ===
- “Ar-Raheeq Al-Makhtum”: Mubarakpuri translated his Arabic book to Urdu himself and it was published by Maktabah Salafiyah Lahore by Ata’ullah Haneef Bhujiyani.
- “Tajaliyat Nubuwwat”: The Urdu translation of “Rawdah Al-Anwar”, published by Darussalam.
- “Qadiyaniyat Apne Aine Mein”: A book authored by Mubarakpuri refuting Qadianism.
- “Fitnah Qadiyaniyat or Molana Thanaullah Amritsari”: A book authored by Mubarakpuri on the efforts of Shaykul Islam Thanaullah Amritsari against Qadianism.
- “Inkar Hadith Kiyun”: On the authority of Hadith.
- “Inkar Hadith Haqq ya Batil”: Against Hadith rejecters
- “Ramz Haqq wa Batil”: A book containing the texts of his debate with a Brelwi scholar.
- “Islam or ‘Adm Tashaddud”: On Islam being a peaceful religion.
- His Arabic Sharh on “Bulugh Al-Maram” called “Ittihad Al-Kiram” has been translated in Urdu by AbdulWakeel Alawi and published by Darussalam after the verification of Irshad Al-Haqq Athari.
- “Suhuf Yahud wa Nasara mein Nabi se Muta’aliq Bashartein”: A book authored by Mubarakpuri on the predictions of Muhammad in the Books of the Jews and Christians.

=== Translations from Arabic to Urdu of books of other scholars ===
- “Ahl e Tasawuuf ki Karstaniyan”: Translation in Urdu by Mubarakpuri of “Fadaih Sufiyah” of Abdur-Rahman Abdu-Khaliq.
- “Tazkirah Shaykh Al-Islam Muhammad ibn AbdilWahhab”: Mubarakpuri’s translation of a book of Ahmad ibn Hajar Aal Botami, and added a detailed introduction on the history of Aal Saud.
- “Shaykh Muhammad ibn AbdilWahab ka Salafi Aqidah or Duniya Islam par Us ka Athar”: Mubarakpuri translated in Urdu a book of Shaykh Salih Al-‘Ubood on Shaykh Muhammad ibn AbdilWahab in 2 volumes in 854 pages total and it was published by Madina University.
- Translation in Urdu by Mubarakpuri of “Al-Masabih fi Masalah At-Tarawih” of Hafiz Suyuti.
- Translation in Urdu by Mubarakpuri of “Mukhtasar Izhar Al-Haqq”.
- “Aimah Arba’ah ka Aqidah”: Translation in Urdu by Mubarakpuri of a book on the creed of the 4 Imams.
- Translation of Mubarakpuri of “Mukhtasar Seerah Ar-Rasool (saw)” of Muhammad ibn AbdilWahab
- Translation of Mubarakpuri of “Al-Kalim At-Tayib” of ibn Taymiayh
- The translation of Mubarakpuri of “Kitab Al-Arba’in An-Nawawi”

=== Books compiled from his articles ===
Mubarakpuri was the editor of the Monthly magazine “Mohadis” Banaris for 6 years and he authored many articles in this magazine and others. In current times many books have been published collecting his articles, such as:

- “Khomeini ka ‘Islami’ Inqilab, Nafsiyati Mahol or Haqaiq”: This book of 82 pages compiles a series of article of Mubarakpuri exposing the reality of Khomeini and his revolution in Iran, it was published by “Nadwah As-Sunnah” Sidarrath Nagar UP. This book has been translated in English by “Umm-ul-Qura Publications” and will be published soon insha Allah.
- “Azab e Qabr ka Bayan”: this book compiles two articles, one of SafiurRahman Mubarakpuri and one of Abu Abdillah Jabir Dimanwi refuting those who deny the punishment of the grave. It was published by Maktabah Muhammadiyah Sahiwal in Pakistan.

=== Some of his works at “Markaz Khidmah As-Seerah wa As-Sunnah” ===
- Mubarakpuri established the format of a “Seerah Encyclopaedia”
- Preparation to establish an Encyclopaedia on the two Holy lands (Haramyn Sharifayn) Makkah and Madinah.
- Compilation of all the narrations of Aishah (Rad) in 9 books of Hadith and other books
- Compilation of cards on Makkah for the publication of an “Encyclopaedia” on Makkah
- Compilation of an index of all Ahadith in the six books and others on Seerah
- Research on the genealogy of Muhammad up to Adam.
- Compilation on the Prophesies of Muhammad in all religions. Mubarakpuri gathered in it as well the predictions in books of Hindus, Buddhists and Zoroastrians.
- The Markaz Khidmah As-Sunna Wa As-Seerah (Centre for the Service of the Sunnah and Sirah) published in English in 2 large volumes “Sirat Al-Nabi (Saw) And The Orientalists with the special reference to the writings of William Muir, D.S. Margoliouth and W. Montgomery Watt” by Muhammad Mohar Ali. SafiurRahman Mubarakpuri reviewed this work.

And many other projects written and reviewed by Mubarakpuri at Markaz Khidmah As-Sunnah wa As-Seerah.

=== Some of his books translated to English ===
- “The Sealed Nectar”: English translation of “Ar-Raheeq Al-Makhtum”, published by Darussalam. The 2nd edition has been revised by Abu Khaliyl (US) who obtained Ijaza in Hadith from SafiurRahman Mubarakpuri
- “When the Moon Split”: English translation of “Rawdah Al-Anwar”, published by Darussalam.
- “In Reply to the Mischief of Denial of Hadith”: Translation of “Inkar e Hadith, Haqq ya Batil”, published by Maktabah Quddusia Lahore.
- All the works of Darussalam mentioned before published under Mubarakpuri's supervision “Tafsir ibn Kathir”, “History of Islam”, “History of Makkah Mukarramah”, “History of Madinah Munawwarah”, Collection from Riyadus Saliheen” and others.
- The Markaz Khidmah As-Sunna Wa As-Seerah (Centre for the Service of the Sunnah and Sirah) published in English in 2 large volumes “Sirat Al-Nabi (Saw) And The Orientalists with the special reference to the writings of William Muir, D.S. Margoliouth and W. Montgomery Watt” by Muhammad Mohar Ali. Mubarakpuri reviewed this work.
- A chapter of his book “Fitnah Qadiyaniyat or Molana Thanaullah Amritsari” has been translated in English and quoted in the book of Suhaib Hasan “Two Essays on Qadianism”, published by Al-Quran Society
- “The Islamic” revolution of Khomeini, the psychological environment and realities”: Translation of “Khomeini ka ‘Islami’ Inqilab, Nafsiyati Mahol or Haqaiq” and it will be published soon by Umm-Ul-Qura Publications.
- Ar-Raheeq Al-Makhtum: transl. The Sealed Nectar.
- When The Moon Split (A Biography of Prophet Muhammad ﷺ); compiled by Safiur-Rahman Mubarakpuri (originally published: July 1998).
- History of Makkah Al-Mukaramah.
- History of Madinah Al-Munawarah.
- Abridged Tafsir Ibn Kathir.

== See also ==
- Abdullah Yusuf Ali
- Marmaduke Pickthall
- Abdul Majid Daryabadi
- Ar-Raheeq Al-Makhtum
