= Mubarakpur, Azamgarh =

Town in Uttar Pradesh, India

Mubarakpur
- Town
- Location in Uttar Pradesh Mubarakpur (India)
- Coordinates: 26°05′16″N 83°17′24″E
- Country: India
- State: Uttar Pradesh
- District: Azamgarh
- Named for: Raja Mubarak Shah

Government
  - Type: Nagar Palika
  - Body: Dr. Saba Shamim
- Elevation: 69 m (226 ft)

Population (2011)
  - Total: 70,463

Language
  - Official: Hindi
  - Additional official: Urdu
- Time zone: UTC+5:30 (IST)
- PIN: 276404
- Vehicle registration: UP-50

Mubarakpur is a town and a municipal board in Azamgarh district in the Indian state of Uttar Pradesh. It is located at a distance of 13 km north-east of the district headquarters in Azamgarh.

== Geography ==
Mubarakpur is located at 26.09°N 83.29°E. It has an average elevation of 69 metres (226 feet).

== Demographics ==
The total population of Mubarakpur is 70,463 as of 2011 census. Males constitute 51.3% of the population whereas females 48.7%.

== Economy ==
Mubarakpur is notable for the manufacture of Varanasi sarees, which are exported.

== Notable places ==
The Temple of Thakurji and the Mosque of Raja Mubarak Shah Jama Masjid are well known places of worship. The Al Jamiatul Ashrafiya is an Islamic seminary of Ahle-Sunnat Muslims in India.

== Notable persons ==
- Abdur-Rahman Mubarakpuri
- Safiur Rahman Mubarakpuri
- Shukrullah Mubarakpuri
- Qazi Athar Mubarakpuri
