= Muhammad Yusuf Taulawi =

Indian Deobandi mufti, hadith teacher and author (born 1954)

Maulana, Mufti Muhammad Yusuf Taʾulawī
- محمد یوسف تاؤلوی

Personal life
- Born: 9 September 1954 (age 71) Tawli, Muzaffarnagar district, Uttar Pradesh, India
- Parent: Azīmuddin (father)
- Era: Contemporary
- Main interest(s): Hadith, fiqh, kalam, tafsir, Urdu poetry
- Education: Darul Uloom Deoband
- Occupation: Islamic scholar, jurist, teacher, author, poet

Religious life
- Religion: Islam
- Denomination: Sunni
- Jurisprudence: Hanafi
- Movement: Deobandi

Muhammad Yusuf Taʾulawī (Note: Urdu: محمد یوسف تاؤلوی) (born 9 September 1954), generally written as Mufti Yusuf Tawli, is an Indian Sunni Muslim scholar of the Deobandi tradition, a mufti, and a long-serving teacher of hadith and fiqh at Darul Uloom Deoband, where he also held academic administrative roles including Nazim-e-Taʿlimat (2016–2019). He has authored more than two dozen works in Urdu and Arabic—among them the multi-volume al-Fatāwā al-Yūsufiyyah, Ashraf al-Hidāyah (on the fourth part of al-Hidāyah), and commentaries on Tafsir al-Baydawi and al-Fawz al-Kabir. Taʾulawī’s Urdu poetry has been anthologized in Nadīm Aḥmad Anṣārī’s Shiʿr-i Faqīh (2019). Spiritually, he is a recognized khalīfah of Mahmood Hasan Gangohi, and he established the publishing house Maktabah Faqīh al-Ummat for issuing his and others' scholarly works.

== Early life and education ==
Muhammad Yusuf Taʾulawī was born on 9 September 1954 (Note: Some Urdu and Arabic sources give 1956 (1375 AH) as the year of birth; this page follows the date 9 September 1954 per Khalili Qasmi.) in Tawli, Muzaffarnagar district, Uttar Pradesh, to Azīmuddin.

He received his early education at Darul Uloom Husainiya, Tawli. In 1972 (1392 AH), he enrolled at Darul Uloom Deoband and graduated from the final hadith class (Dawrah-yi Hadith) in 1974 (1394 AH). He completed ifta training the following year under Mahmood Hasan Gangohi.

His hadith teachers included: Sharif Hasan Deobandi (Sahih al-Bukhari, Part I), Mahmood Hasan Gangohi (Bukhari, Part II), Abdul Ahad (Sahih Muslim), Sharif Hasan Deobandi (Jami' al-Tirmidhi), Muhammad Husain Bihari (Sunan Abi Dawud), Naʻim Ahmad Deobandi (Sunan al-Nasa'i), Naseer Ahmad Khan (Tahawi's Sharh Maʻani al-Athar), Mirajul Haq Deobandi (Shama'il at-Tirmidhi), Nizamuddin Azami (Muwatta Imam Malik), and Anzar Shah Kashmiri (al-Shaybani's Muwatta). In ifta he further studied with Nizamuddin Aʻzami and Ahmad ʻAli Saeed Nagīnavi.

== Career ==
After graduation, Taʾulawī taught for three years at Madrasa Muradiya, Muzaffarnagar, and then for seven years at Darul Uloom Chilla, Amroha, where he taught senior classes including hadith texts.

He was appointed a teacher at Darul Uloom Deoband in Shawwal 1405 AH (July 1985), progressed to the senior (ʻulyā) level by 1430 AH (2009), and additionally served for many years as superintendent of the student hostel (Nazim Dar al-Iqama). He was appointed Nazim Taʻlimat (head of academic affairs) in Safar 1438 AH (November 2016) and served until Dhu al-Qa'dah 1440 AH (July 2019).

He also established a publishing house, Maktabah Faqīh al-Ummat, through which a number of his works and other scholarly writings have been issued.

=== Poetry ===
He was also known for his Urdu poetry. A chapter on his poetic contributions is included in Nadīm Aḥmad Anṣārī's work Shiʿr-i Faqīh: Deoband se wābastah baʿẓ mashhūr muftiyān-i kirām aur unkī Urdū shāʻirī kā taz̲kirah (2019), covering pages 244–265.

=== Spiritual affiliation ===
In 1395 AH (1975 CE), Taʾulawī pledged allegiance (bayʿah) to his teacher Mahmood Hasan Gangohi for spiritual training (tazkiyah wa sulūk). He regularly corresponded with him to seek guidance and spent extended periods, including the month of Ramadan, in his company. In 1403 AH (1983 CE), he received authorization (ijāzah) and khilāfah from Gangohi, and was subsequently included among his recognized deputies (khulafāʾ).

In April 2024, Bangladeshi media reported that Taʾulawī was among the senior scholars who joined Shaykh Ibrāhīm Afrīqī's Ramadan iʿtikāf and related programs in Bangladesh. Later that year, he was also listed among the scholars addressing the annual two-day Islāḥī Jor gathering at Darul Uloom Madaninagar, Dhaka.

=== Views on Palestine ===
In November 2023, Taʾulawī addressed an online conference on al-Quds, where he described the protection of Al-Aqsa Mosque as a collective religious duty of Muslims and urged unity on the issue.

== Selected works ==
Taʾulawī has authored more than two dozen works ranging from multi-volume commentaries to concise treatises. His writings cover fiqh, theology, tafsir, hadith, logic and grammar. Among his major works are:

- al-Fatāwā al-Yūsufiyyah (four-volume compendium of fatwas)
- Ashraf al-Hidāyah (a four-volume Urdu commentary on the fourth part of al-Hidāyah, from Kitāb al-Shufʿah to the end)
- Jawāhir al-Farāʾid sharḥ Sharḥ al-ʿAqāʾid (detailed commentary on al-Taftāzānī's Sharḥ al-ʿAqāʾid)
- Badāʾiʿ al-Kalām fī Bayān ʿAqāʾid al-Islām (on Islamic creed and kalām)
- Taqrīrāt al-Taʾulawī ʿalā Tafsīr al-Bayḍāwī (Urdu commentary on Tafsir al-Baydawi, popularly known as Dars-i Bayḍāwī)
- Fayḍ al-Khabīr (Urdu commentary on Shah Waliullah al-Dehlawi’s al-Fawz al-Kabīr)
- al-Qawāʿid al-Fiqhiyyah al-Maḥmūdah (critical edition of Abū al-Kalām Shafīq al-Qāsimī's text)
- Ḥāshiya ʿalā Fatāwā Rashīdiyyah (marginal notes on Fatāwā Rashīdiyyah of Rashid Ahmad Gangohi)

In addition, he produced works such as Ighnāʾ al-Ḥizb ʿan Masʾalat Imkān al-Kidhb, al-Kalām al-Munazzam fī Tawḍīḥ mā fī al-Sullam, Dars al-Sirājī, Dars ʿAqīdat al-Ṭaḥāwī, Dars-e-Ḥusāmī, and partial commentaries on Tafsir al-Jalalayn, Muwatta’ Imam Malik and Sunan al-Nasa'i. He also wrote treatises such as Tanqīḥ al-Afkār fī Taḥqīq Isbāl al-Izār, Dalāʾil al-Nubuwwah (on Mahmood Hasan Gangohi’s Guldasta-yi Salām), Uṣūl al-Taʿbīr (principles of dream interpretation), and annotations on al-Jurjānī's al-Taʿrīfāt and al-Ḥamawī's Ghamz ʿUyūn al-Baṣāʾir.
