= Gangohi =

Gangohi (Urdu: گنگوہی, Gangohī) is a nisbat or surname derived from the name of the city of Gangoh in India. The Arabic form is al-Kankuhi (Arabic: الكنكوهي, al-Kankūhī) or al-Janjuhi (Arabic: الجنجوهي, al-Janjūhī).

== List of persons with the name ==
- Abdul Quddus Gangohi
- Mahmud Hasan Gangohi
- Rashid Ahmad Gangohi
