= Badhi Mazara =

Village in Uttar Pradesh, India

Badhi Mazra is a village situated in the Gangoh Mandal of Saharanpur District in Uttar Pradesh, India. It is situated about 3.288 km far from the Mandal headquarters at Gangoh, and is 488 km distance from the state capital Lucknow. A significant proportion of the population belongs to the gurjar community.

Villages nearby include Salarpura (1.5 km), Budhanpur (1.7 km), Kamhera (2.4 km), Khanpur Gujar (2.7 km), Budha Khera (3.1 km) and Sukheri (3.2 km).
