= Masjid-e-Rasheed =

Mosque in Saharanpur, Uttar Pradesh, India

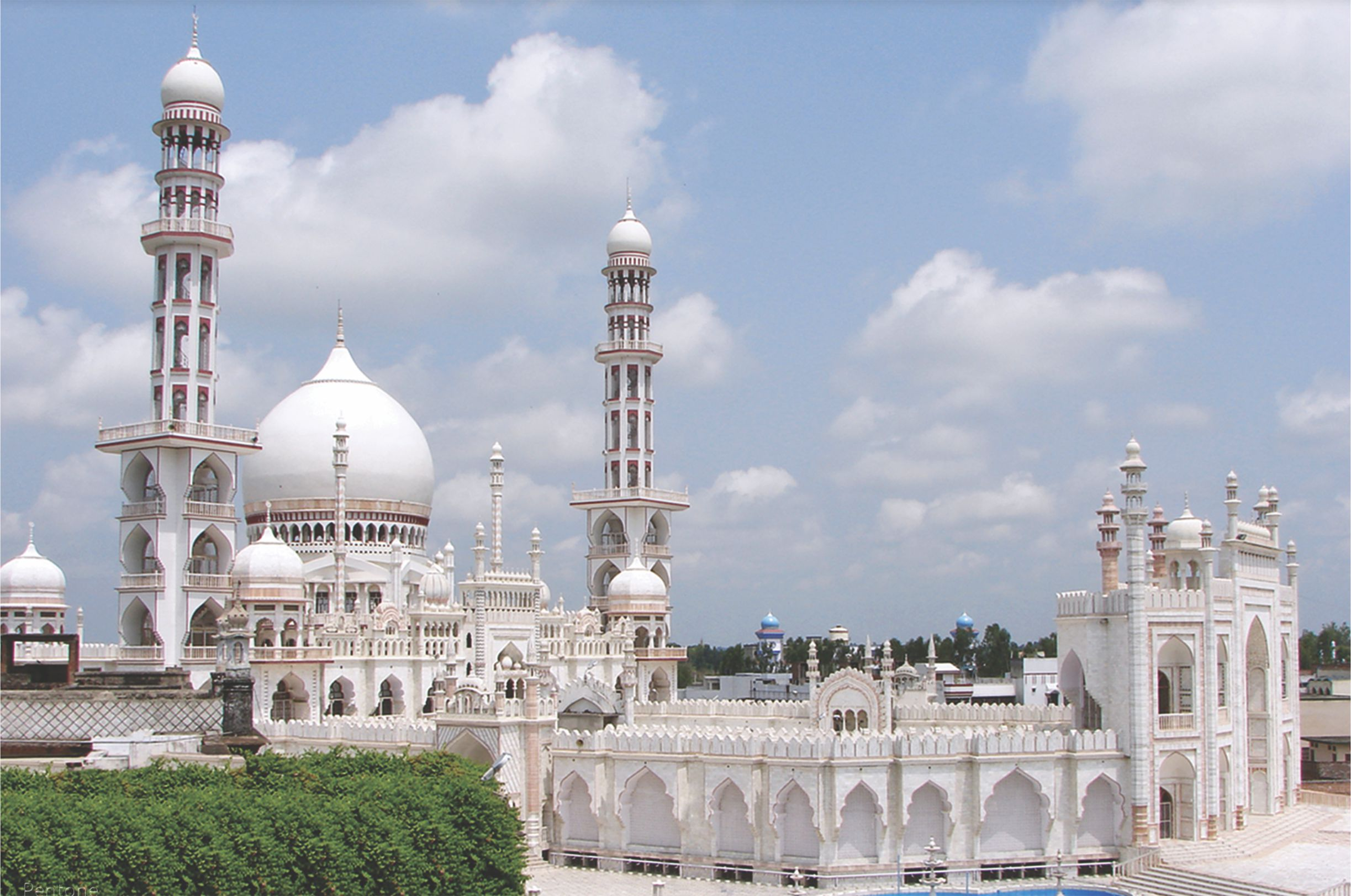
- The mosque in 2018

- Location of the mosque in Uttar Pradesh

Religion
- Affiliation: Sunni Islam
- Sect: Hanafi
- Ecclesiastical or organisational status: Friday mosque
- Governing body: Majlis-al-Shura

Location
- Location: Darul Uloom Deoband compound, Deoband, Saharanpur district, Uttar Pradesh
- Country: India
- Coordinates: 29°41′54″N 77°40′34″E

Architecture
- Architect: Abdul Khaliq Madrasi
- Type: Mosque architecture
- Style: Indo-Islamic; Mughal; Modernist
- Established: 14 April 1986
- Construction cost: ₹10cr

Specifications
- Capacity: 20,000 worshippers
- Length: 120 m (390 ft)
- Width: 60 m (200 ft)
- Dome: One (maybe more)
- Dome height (outer): 37 m (120 ft)
- Minaret: Two
- Minaret height: 55 m (180 ft)
- Materials: Makrana marble

Website
- darululoom-deoband.com/en/

The Masjid-e-Rasheed, also known as the Jame Rashid Mosque, and the Masjid-e-Rashidiyah, and the Taj Masjid, also sometimes spelled as the Masjid Jam-e-Rashid, is a Sunni Hanafi Friday mosque, located in the compound of Darul Uloom Deoband in Deoband, in the Saharanpur district of the state of Uttar Pradesh, India. This mosque is named after Rasheed Ahmad Gangohi, the second patron of Darul Uloom Deoband.

== Overview ==
Masjid e-Rasheed features white stone tiling, large grounds, galleries, minarets, a pond, and a flower garden. The architecture often draws comparisons to the Taj Mahal, particularly at night, making it a prominent destination for visitors.

When the administration of Darul Uloom decided to build this mosque, they did not imagined that the mosque would turn out to be so beautiful. As soon as the construction started, the community started donating an unexpected amount, and as a result the earlier simpler plan was changed. It took twenty years and a lot of money to complete the current structure. The mosque has a 37-metre-high (120 ft) dome, two 55-metre-high (180 ft) minarets, and five doors. It has space for 20,000 worshippers at a time.

The late president of Jamiat Ulema-e-Hind Asad Madani used to do Iʿtikāf (seclusion meditation) with hundreds of his disciples during Ramzan until his death. His son Mahmood Madani has kept on the same.

== Gallery ==
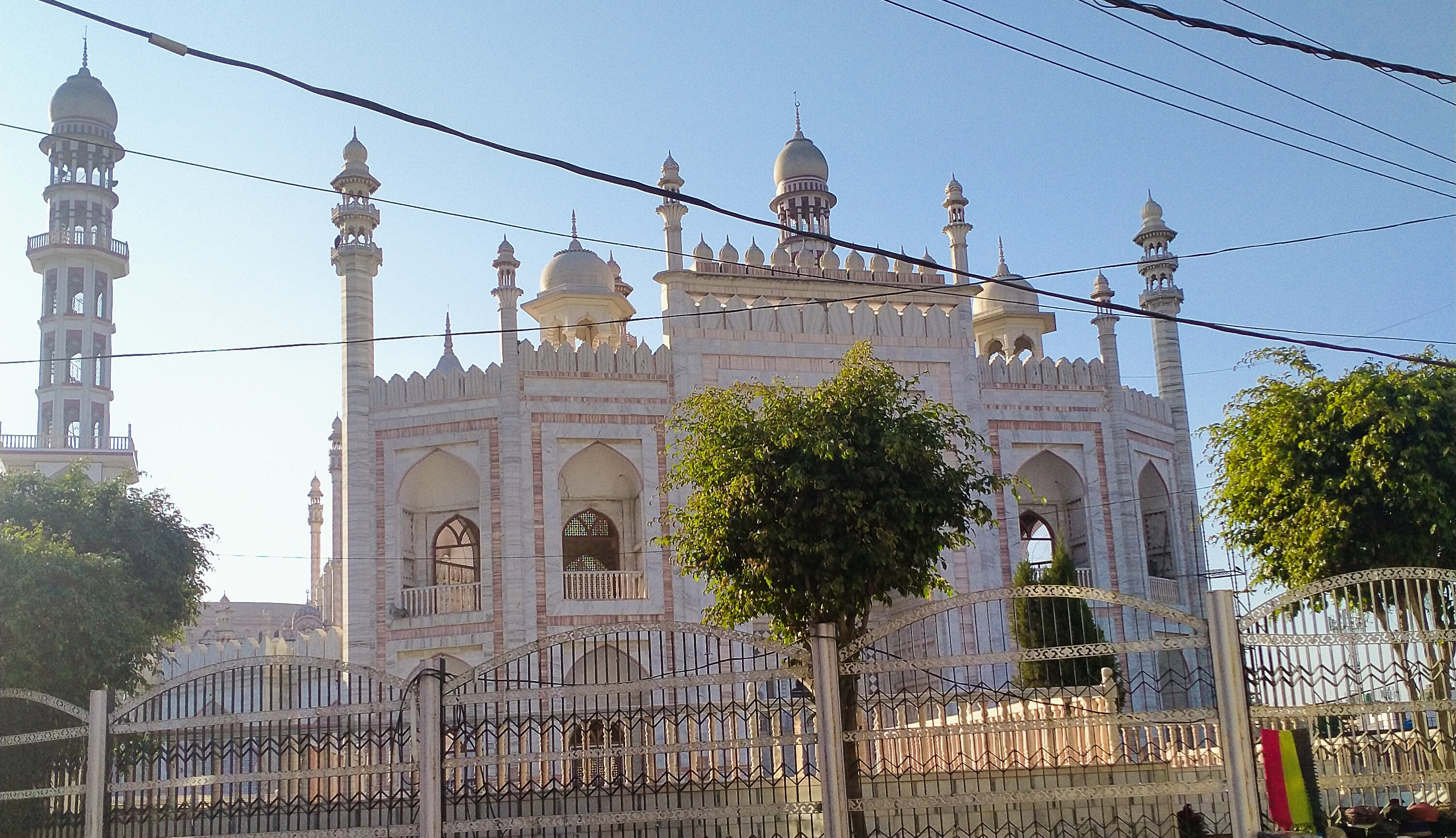
The mosque exterior

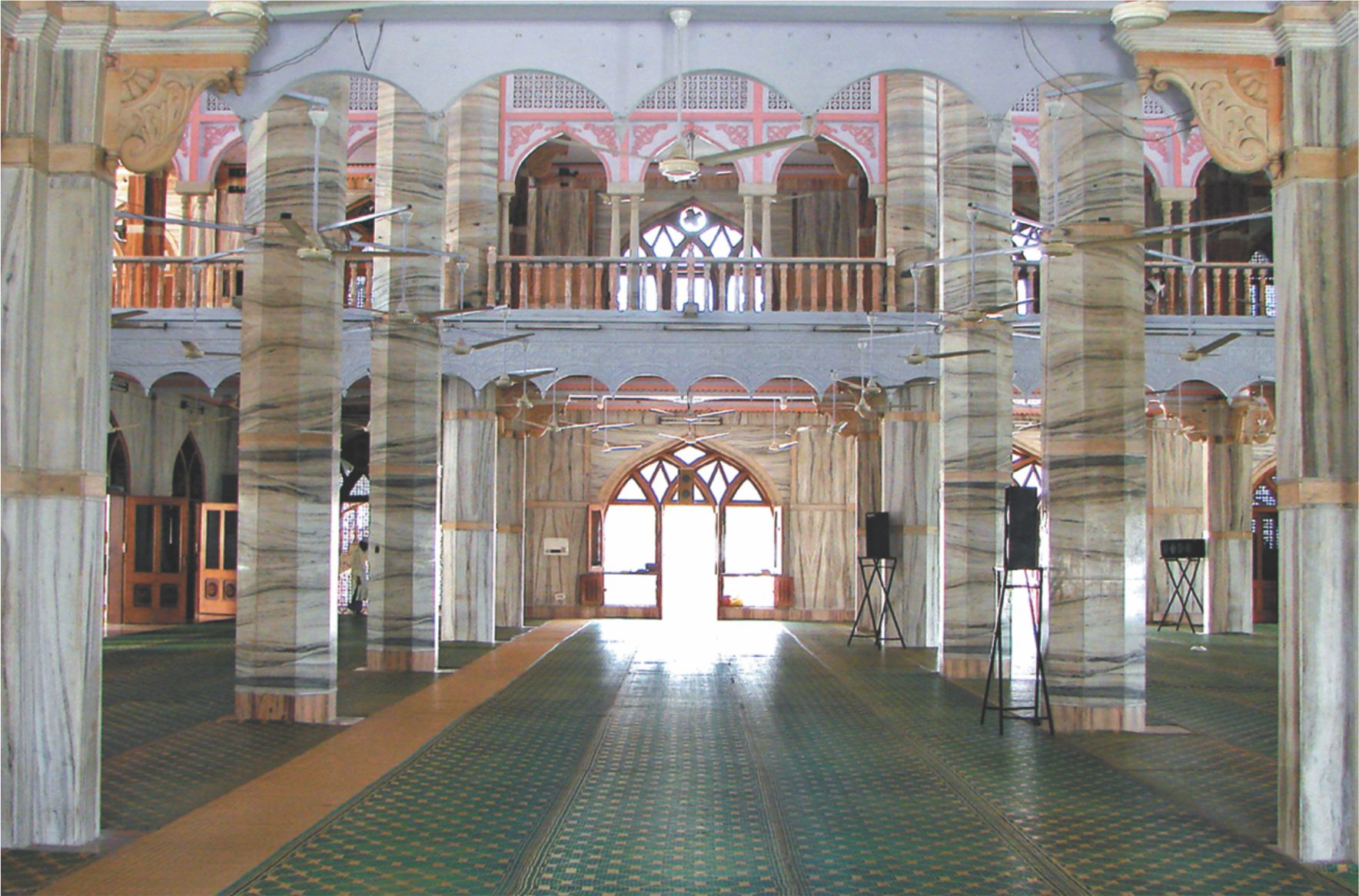
The mosque interior

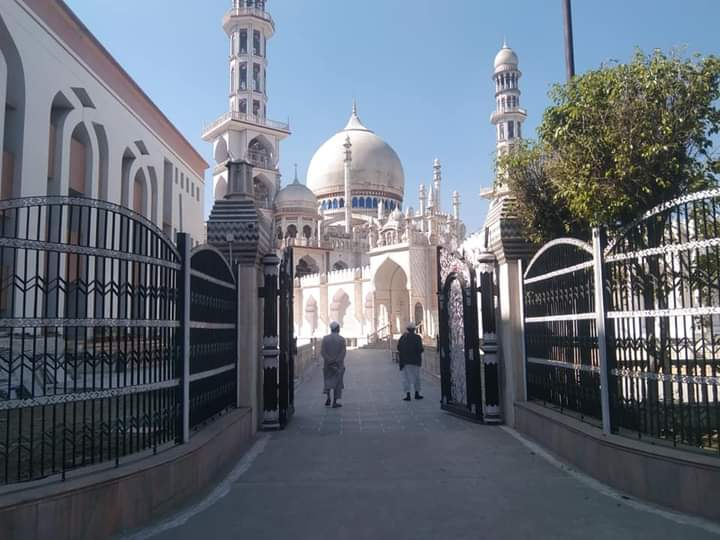
A view of the mosque through a gate

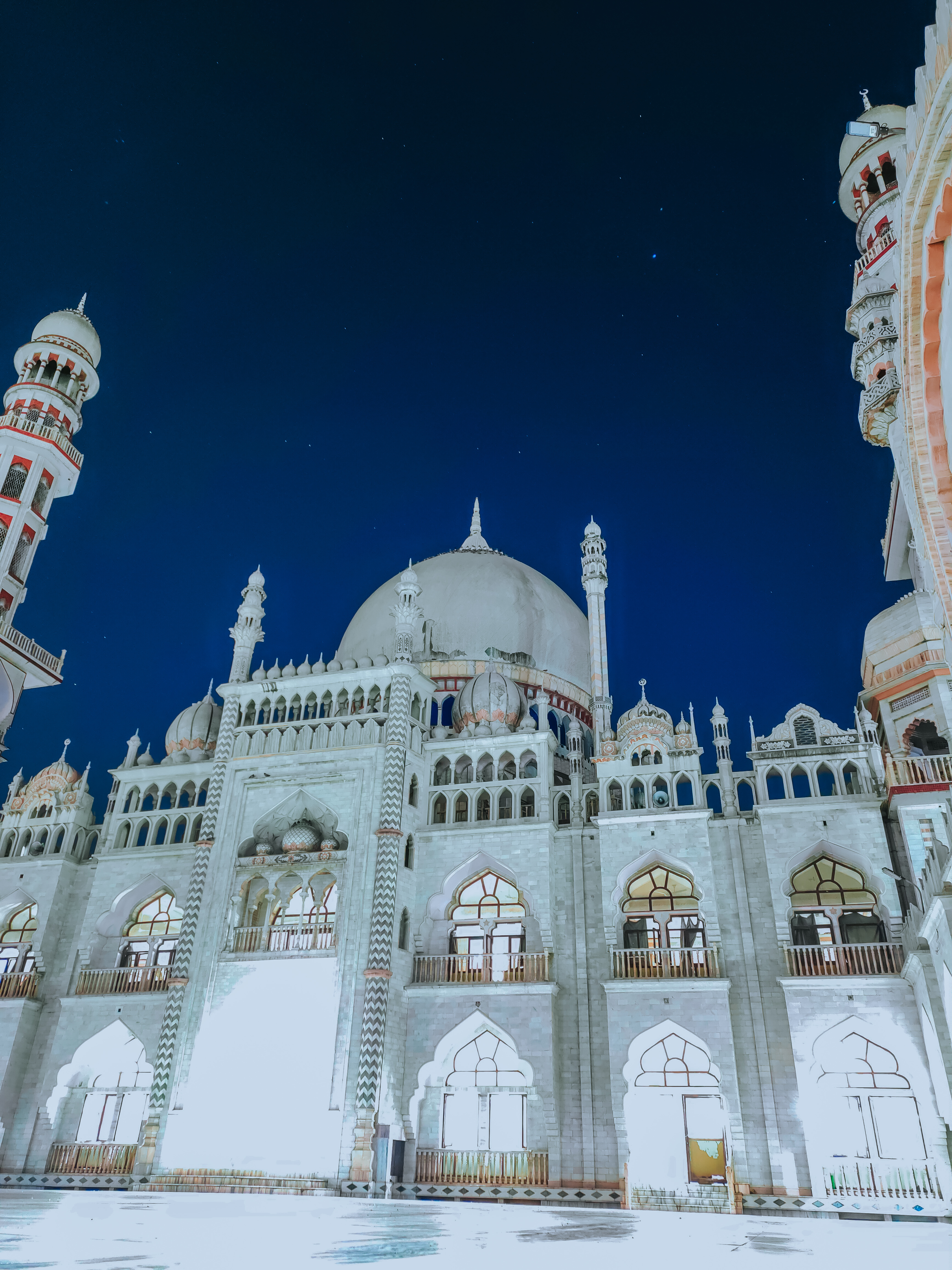
The mosque in the evening

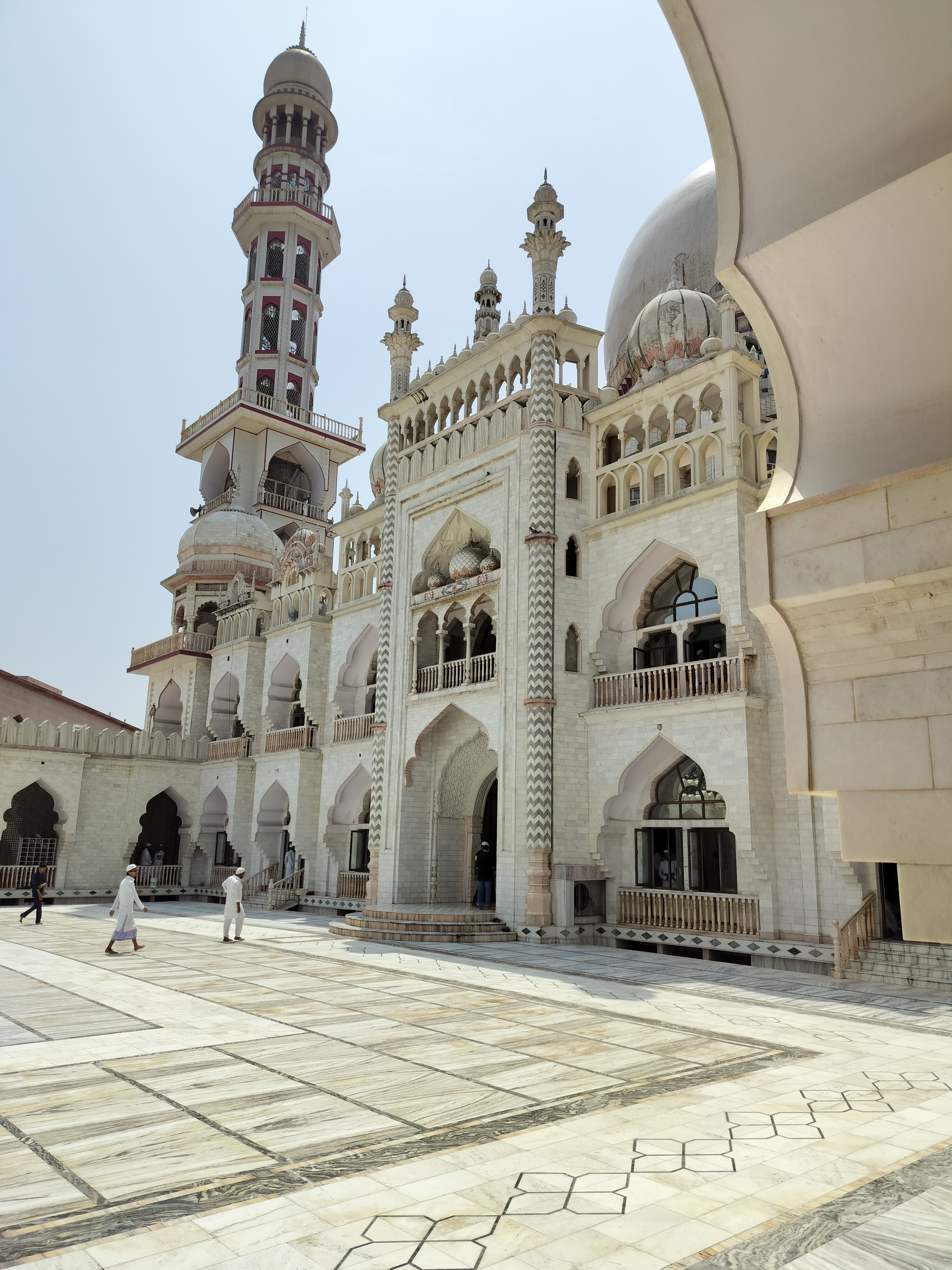
one sided view

== See also ==
- Islam in India
- List of mosques in India
