= Al-Muhannad ala al-Mufannad =

Deobandi creed book

The Sword on the Disproved
- Editor: Muhammad ibn Adam al-Kawthari
- Author: Khalil Ahmad al-Saharanpuri
- Original title: المهند على المفند
- Working title: مباحث في عقائد أهل السنة
- Translator: Translated into Persian by 'Abd al-Rahman Sarbazi
- Language: Arabic, Urdu, Pashto, and Persian
- Publisher: Dar al-Fath, Jordan (Revised Arabic edition), Library of Darul Uloom Karachi
- Publication place: India
- Pages: 150
- ISBN: 9789957234409
- The book answers the 26 most common questions people have about 'aqidah of Sunnis, according to Deobandis.

Al-Muhannad 'ala al-Mufannad (Arabic: المهند على المفند, lit. 'The Sword on the Disproved'), also known as al-Tasdiqat li-Daf' al-Talbisat (Arabic: التصديقات لدفع التلبيسات, lit. 'Endorsements Repelling Deceits'), was subsequently published in Urdu as 'Aqa'id 'Ulama' Ahl al-Sunna Deoband (The Beliefs of the Sunni Scholars of Deoband) is a book that expresses some of the beliefs held by the Sunni Hanafi Deobandis. It was authored by the Indian Hanafi-Maturidi hadith scholar and Sufi master Khalil Ahmad al-Saharanpuri in 1907, who wrote a commentary on Sunan Abi Dawud, entitled Badhl al-Majhud.

The book is not an independent book on creed, but rather a compilation of questions and answers which were asked by the Arab scholars at that time. These questions were sent to the Deobandi scholars by Husain Ahmad al-Madani, who was living in Medina, so Saharanpuri responded and answered them, and then these questions and answers were compiled into a book and were printed under the name of al-Muhannad 'ala al-Mufannad. Since most of these questions were related to beliefs, and in the correct jargon, were related to the branches which pertain to beliefs and the science of Kalam, it became published under the title of Mabahith fi 'Aqa'id Ahl al-Sunna (Arabic: مباحث في عقائد أهل السنة, lit. 'Discussions in the Beliefs of the People of Sunna').

== Summary ==
The text succinctly summarizes Deobandi perspectives on a range of controversial issues, such as: the ruling on Wahhabis, the ruling on celebrating Prophet Muhammad's birth (al-Mawlid al-Nabawi), whether the Deobandis believe it commendable to visit the Prophet Muhammad's grave (they do, according to Saharanpuri), whether intercession through the Prophet or saints is permissible (it is, so long as one understands the power to intercede comes from God), whether the Prophet is living in his grave (he is), whether it is permissible to send salutations to the Prophet (it is), whether any part of creation is better than the Prophet (it is not), whether the Prophet is the Seal of the Prophets (he is), and the possibility of the occurrence of lying or reneging on a promise, among other topics and issues that were raised by various sects of Islam towards Deobandi scholars.

== Publication history ==
According to Muhammad ibn Adam al-Kawthari, the book first appeared in the 1325 Hijri year.

=== Revised Arabic edition ===
The edited version of al-Muhannad ala al-Mufannad by Muhammad ibn Adam al-Kawthari, entitled Mabahith fi Aqa’id Ahl al-Sunna al-Musamma al-Muhannad ala al-Mufannad was first published in Arabic in 2004 in Amman (Jordon) by Dar al-Fath for Research and Publishing and copies of it are available in bookshops in many Arab counties such as Syria, Jordon, UAE, Yemen and Egypt.

=== Pashto edition ===
The book was translated into Pashto by Habib al-Rahman Habibi.

=== Persian edition ===
The book was translated into Persian by Abd al-Rahman Sarbazi, an Iranian Sunni Hanafi scholar, and published in 2015 in Mashhad.

== Quotes ==
Here are some quotations from the book:

=== Methodological principles ===
It should be known firstly, before we begin to answer, that we and our mashayikh (plural of shaykh, meaning 'religious scholars') – Allah's pleasure be on them all – and our entire group and congregation are, by Allah's praise: Imitators of the guide of creation, the pinnacle of Islam, the valiant Imam, the greatest Imam, Abu Hanifa al-Nu'man – Allah Exalted is He be pleased with him – in the peripherals; and followers of the noble Imam Abu al-Hasan al-Ash'ari and the noble Imam Abu Mansur al-Maturidi (Allah be pleased with them) in creed and the fundamentals; and that we are adherents to the following Sufi ways: the most distinguished way of the Naqshbandi masters, the most pure way of the Chishti masters, the most glorious way of the Qadiri masters, and the most radiant way of the Suhrawardi masters (Allah be pleased with them all). — Al-Muhannad 'ala al-Mufannad (Questions One and Two)

=== Ruling on Wahhabism ===
Their ruling according to us is what the author of al-Durr al-Mukhtar said: "The Khawarij are a violent group that rebelled against 'Ali due to an interpretation by which they believed that he was on falsehood and disbelief or disobedience making fighting him obligatory according to their interpretation. They legitimise our bloods and our properties and they insult our women," until he said: "Their ruling is the ruling of rebels," and then he said, "We do not anathematise them only due to it being from interpretation although false." Al-Shami said in his marginalia: "As has occurred in our time in the followers of 'Abd al-Wahhab who came out from Najd and dominated the two Harams and would claim to belong to the madhhab of the Hanbalis but they believed that they are the Muslims and those who disagreed with their belief are polytheists, and due to this they legitimised the slaughter of the Ahl al-Sunnah and the slaughter of their 'ulama until Allah broke their supremacy." — Al-Muhannad 'ala al-Mufannad (Question Twelve)

=== Issue of the possibility of lying ===
That which they attributed to the eminent and incomparable shaykh, the scholar of his time, the peerless of his age, Mawlana Rashid Ahmad Gangohi, that he said that the Creator (Exalted is His Eminence) actually lied and that the one who says this has not erred, it is a fabrication about him (Allah Most High have mercy on him) and is from the lies concocted by the deceptive and lying devils (Allah confound them! How they are perverted!). His respected person is innocent of such heresy and disbelief. The fatwa of the shaykh that was printed and published in volume one of his Fatawa Rashidiyyah (p. 119) falsifies their [claim]. — Al-Muhannad 'ala al-Mufannad (Question Twenty Three)

== Reception ==
The book has been described by Muhammad Ali Jalandhari (1895–1971) as "sarkari tarjuman", (the official spokesperson) for the tradition of Deoband, to accept which is to be Deobandi, and to deviate from which is to depart from the Deobandi tradition.” According to Mazhar Husayn (1914–2004), "Al-Muhannad is, as it were, a unanimous historical document of the senior Deobandi scholars that has preserved the Deobandi tradition in terms of its principles." The book was positively received by scholars such as Mahmud Hasan Deobandi, Ashraf Ali Thanwi, Muhammad Shafi, Muhammad Yousuf Banuri, Muhammad Tayyib Qasmi, Zafar Ahmad Usmani, Mahmood Ashraf Usmani, and Selim al-Bishri (chief Maliki mufti and Grand Imam of Al-Azhar), and others. Muhammad Yusuf Ludhianvi (1932–2000) description of the book, as stated in Fatawa Bayyinat (Urdu: فتاوى بينات):

There were several phases of the Akābir of Deoband. The first phase is that of Hadrat Nanautawi, Hadrat Gangohi, Hadrat Mawlana Muhammad Ya'qub Nanautawi (Allah have mercy on them) and their contemporaries. The second phase is that of the students of these Akābir, amongst whom Shaykh al-Hind (the Shaykh of India), Hadrat Mawlana Khalil Ahmad Saharanpuri, Hadrat Hakim al-Ummat Tahanwi (Allah have mercy on them) and other Akābir are included. The third phase is that of their students, amongst whom Hadrat Mawlana Anwar Shah Kashmiri, Mawlana Sayyid Hussain Ahmad Madani, Hadrat Mawlana Shabbir Ahmad 'Usmani (Allah have mercy on them) and others are included. The fourth phase is that of their students amongst whom Mawlana Muhammad Yusuf Banuri, Hadrat Mawlana Muhammad Shafi' Sahib (Allah have mercy on them) and their contemporary Akābir are included. Now, the fifth phase, that of their students, is proceeding. All Akābir from the second phase signed al-Muhannad 'ala al-Mufannad. These were the beliefs of the Akābir from the first phase, and the Akābir of the third and fourth phases have continued to be in agreement with them. Thus, there is consensus of all the Akābir of Deoband on the beliefs incorporated in al-Muhannad. There is no scope for a Deobandi to deviate from them. Whoever deviates from them is not deserving of being called a “Deobandi”.

== See also ==
- Fatawa-e-Rashidiya
- Fatawa Darul Uloom Deoband
- Fitnat al-Wahhabiyya
- Fada'il al-A'mal
