= Kunda Kalan =

Village in Uttar Pradesh, India

Kunda Kalan a village situated in the Gangoh Mandal of Saharanpur District in Uttar Pradesh, India. It is located 12.64 kilometres from the mandal headquarters at Gangoh and is 488 kilometres from the state capital in Lucknow.

Villages nearby include Kunda Khurd (2.6 km), Dhulawli (2.7 km), Basi (3.5 km), Sikanderpur (4.3 km), Sikanderpur (4.3 km), Khalidpur (5.1 km) and Binpur (5.6 km).
