= Muhammad ibn Adam Al-Kawthari =

British Mufti

Mufti Muhammad ibn Adam Al-Kawthari
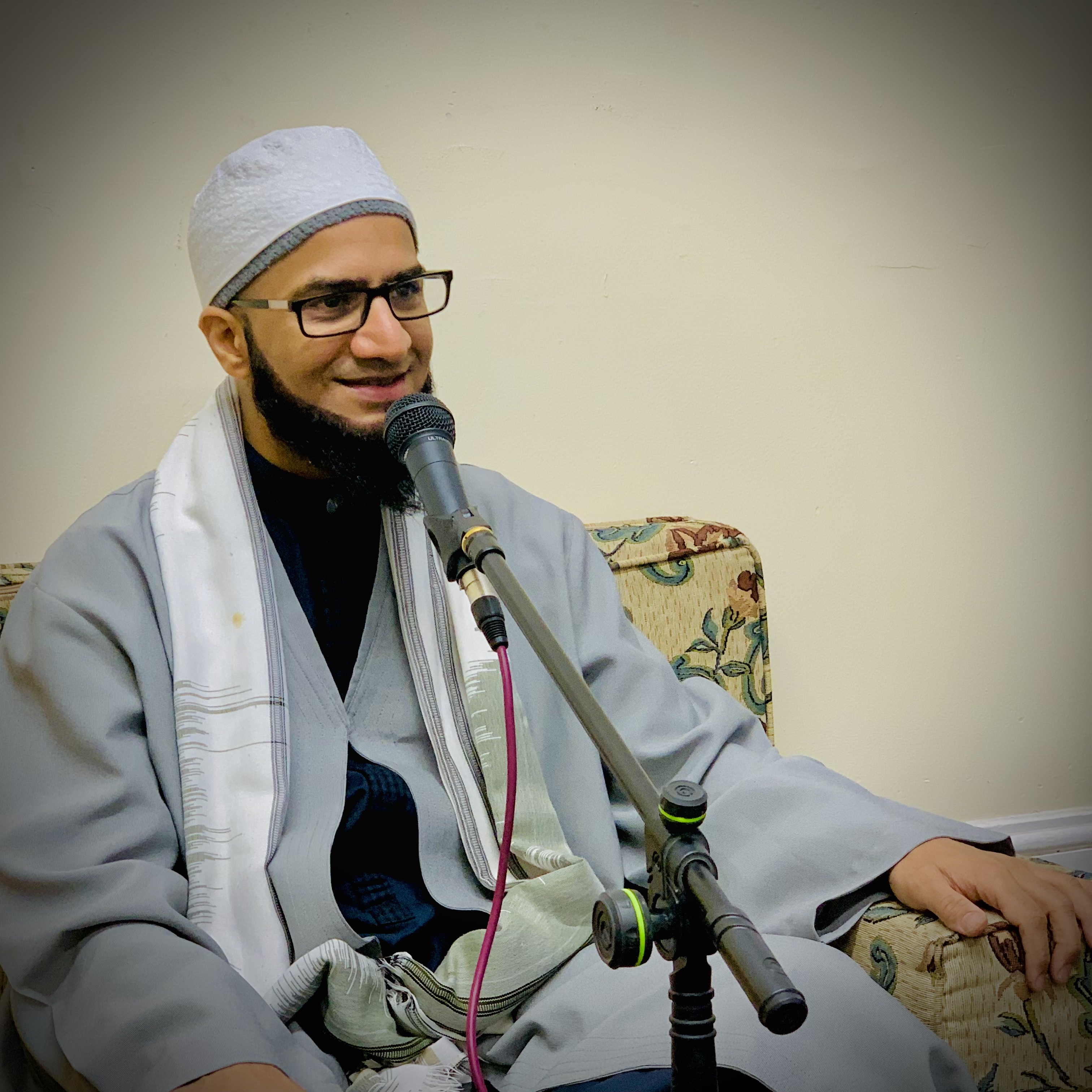
- Al-Kawthari in 2023

Chief Mufti of Darul Ifta Leicester

Personal life
- Born: 1976 (age 49–50) Leicester, England
- Main interest: Fiqh
- Notable works: Islamic Guide to Sexual Relations; Mabahith fi 'Aqa'id Ahl al-Sunna
- Education: Darul Uloom Karachi; Darul Uloom Bury
- Occupation: Mufti

Religious life
- Religion: Islam
- Denomination: Sunni
- Founder of: Darul Ifta Leicester
- Jurisprudence: Hanafi
- Movement: Deobandi

Muslim leader
- Teacher: Taqi Usmani; Yusuf Motala
- Arabic name
- Personal (Ism): Muḥammad محمد
- Patronymic (Nasab): ibn Ādam بن آدم
- Teknonymic (Kunya): Abū ʿAbd Allāh أبو عبد الله
- Toponymic (Nisba): al-Kawtharī الكوثري

Muhammad ibn Adam Al-Kawthari (born 1976) is a British Sunni Islamic scholar, jurist, mufti, researcher, founder and Chief Mufti of Darul Ifta Leicester and a teacher at Jamiah Uloom-ul-Quran Leicester. He has authored a number of books including Islamic Guide to Sexual Relations and Birth Control & Abortion in Islam. He has written a commentary to the Deobandi creed book Al-Muhannad ala al-Mufannad in Arabic language.

== Biography ==
Al-Kawthari's father Mawlana Adam was one of the senior scholars in England. Shaykh Adam Square in Leicester is named after him. Born in Leicester, Al-Kawthari graduated from Darul Uloom Bury and later studied with Taqi Usmani at Darul Uloom Karachi. His other teachers include his father Mawlana Adam and Yusuf Motala. During 2000, he studied under Abd al-Razzaq al-Halabi and Abd al-Latif Farfur al-Hasani in Syria.

Al-Kawthari is founder and Chief-Mufti of Darul Ifta Leicester and a teacher at Jamiah Uloom-ul-Quran Leicester. He also teaches traditional Islamic sciences in London. He is an Islamic jurist and researcher.

== Publications ==
Al-Kawthari authored Islamic Guide to Sexual Relations and Mabahith fi 'Aqa'id Ahl al-Sunna, a marginalia in Arabic language to Al-Muhannad alal Mufannad, the creed book of Deobandis, authored by Khalil Ahmad Saharanpuri. His other works include:

- Birth Control & Abortion in Islam
- Al-Arbaʿin: Elucidation of Forty Hadiths on Marriage
- The Issue of Shares and Simplified Rules of Zakat
