= Jamiat-Ul-Ulama of Mauritius =

Islamic organization in Mauritius

- جمیعت العلماء موریشس
- Formation: 1978; 48 years ago
- Founder: Mauritian Islamic scholars
- Type: Non-profit; Religious organization
- Purpose: Religious guidance, education, community services
- Headquarters: Port Louis, Mauritius
- Region served: Mauritius
- Services: Islamic rulings, educational programs, community development
- Official language: English, Arabic, Urdu
- Main organ: Shura Council
- Affiliations: Deobandi
- Website: www.jamiat-ul-ulama.org

Jamiat-Ul-Ulama of Mauritius (JUM; Urdu: جمیعت العلماء موریشس; translation: "Assembly of Islamic Scholars of Mauritius") is a prominent Deobandi-affiliated Islamic religious organization in Mauritius. It serves as a central body of Islamic scholars providing religious guidance, educational resources, and community services to the Muslim community of Mauritius, operating within the Hanafi school of Sunni jurisprudence.

== History ==
Jamiat-Ul-Ulama of Mauritius was established in 1978 in Port Louis, Mauritius, by a group of local Islamic scholars. Its formation was aimed at addressing the religious and social needs of the Muslim community in Mauritius, providing authentic Islamic guidance rooted in classical scholarship while engaging with the unique context of Mauritian society.

== Activities and services ==
The organization's work encompasses several key areas:

- Dar al-Ifta (Islamic Rulings Department): Provides religious verdicts (fatwas) on a wide range of issues from worship to modern social and economic matters.
- Education and Training: Oversees and supports madrasas and Islamic schools across Mauritius. It also offers adult education programs and teacher training for Islamic studies instructors.
- Community Development: Engages in various community development projects, including poverty alleviation, healthcare initiatives, and programs for youth development.
- Interfaith Dialogue: Participates in interfaith dialogues and initiatives to promote peaceful coexistence and mutual understanding among different religious communities in Mauritius.

== Ideology ==
Jamiat-Ul-Ulama of Mauritius operates within the Deobandi tradition of Sunni Islam. It adheres to the Hanafi school of jurisprudence and the Maturidi school of theology. The organization emphasizes following classical Islamic scholarship while promoting social harmony and national integration within Mauritian society.

== Publications ==
The organization produces and disseminates Islamic literature relevant to Muslims in Mauritius, including:

- Al-Huda (monthly magazine)
- Books and pamphlets on Islamic beliefs, jurisprudence, and social issues.
- Research papers and position statements on contemporary issues affecting the Muslim community.

== See also ==
- Islam in Mauritius
- Deobandi
- Muslims in Mauritius
- Religion in Mauritius
