= Raja Gang =

Raja Gang was a legendary hero in the area now known as Uttar Pradesh, India, and claimed founder of the town of Gangoh, which bears his name.
