= Muhammad Hanif Gangohi =

Islamic scholar and writer (1935 - 2012)

- محمد حنیف گنگوہی

Personal life
- Born: 1935 Gangoh, Saharanpur, Uttar Pradesh, India
- Died: 10 June 2012 (aged 76–77)
- Notable work(s): Madin al-Haqaiq Sharah Urdu Kanz al-Daqaiq ma'a Jadid Izafaat; Al-Subh al-Nuri Sharah Urdu Mukhtasar al-Quduri; Zafar-ul-Muhasselin Baaahwal-ul-Musannefin; Qurrat al-Uyun fi Tadhkirat al-Funun; Tohfatul Adab Urdu Sharh Nafhatul Arab; 'Nail ul Amani Urdu Sharh Mukhtasar ul Maani; G̲h̲āyat al-sa'āyat fī ḥal māfī al-hadāyat; Tolu Al -Nirin Sharh Urdu Hidaya Akhirin; Al Raoz Al Nazeer Urdu Sharh Al Faoz ul Kabeer; Falah o Bahbood Urdu Sharha Abu Dawood
- Education: Darul Uloom Deoband
- Occupation: Islamic scholar, author

Religious life
- Religion: Islam

Muhammad Hanif Gangohi (محمد حنیف گنگوہی) (10 - 1935 June 2012) was an Islamic scholar and author known for his contributions to Islamic literature, particularly in the fields of jurisprudence, history, and education. His works have been widely studied in Madrasas and academic circles. Born in Gangoh, Uttar Pradesh, India, Gangohi pursued his early education locally before enrolling at the Darul Uloom Deoband.

== Early life and education ==
Gangohi was born in 1935 in Gangoh, a town in the Saharanpur district of Uttar Pradesh, India. He pursued his early education at local institutions before enrolling at the Darul Uloom Deoband.

== Literary contributions ==
Gangohi authored several texts. Some of his notable works include:

- Madin al-Haqaiq Sharah Urdu Kanz al-Daqaiq ma'a Jadid Izafaat: A comprehensive Urdu commentary on Kanz al-Daqaiq elucidating intricate jurisprudential issues.
- Al-Subh al-Nuri Sharah Urdu Mukhtasar al-Quduri: An Urdu commentary on Mukhtasar al-Quduri
- Zafar-ul-Muhasselin Baaahwal-ul-Musannefin: Biographies of authors whose books are part of the Dars-i-Nizami course.
- Qurrat al-Uyun fi Tadhkirat al-Funun
- Tohfatul Adab Urdu Sharh Nafhatul Arab
- Nail ul Amani Urdu Sharh Mukhtasar ul Maani
- G̲h̲āyat al-sa'āyat fī ḥal māfī al-hadāyat
- Tolu Al -Nirin Sharh Urdu Hidaya Akhirin
- Al Raoz Al Nazeer Urdu Sharh Al Faoz ul Kabeer
- Falah o Bahbood Urdu Sharha Abu Dawood

== Death ==
Gangohi died on 10 June 2012.
