= Deobandi movement =

Sunni revivalist movement in South Asia

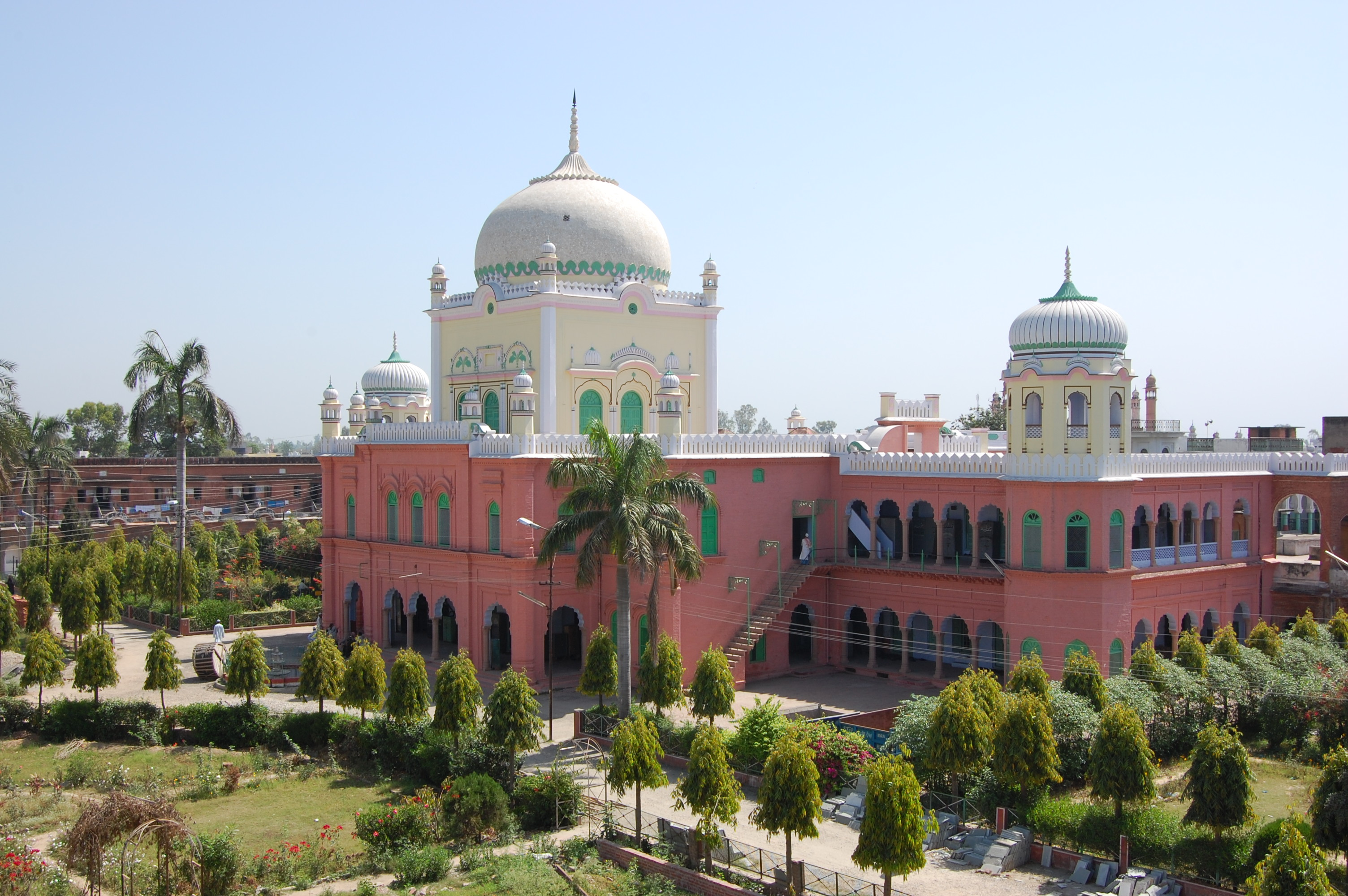
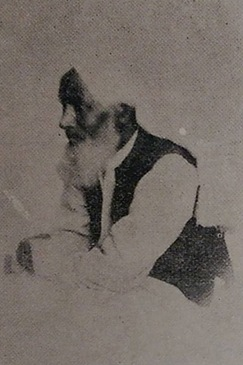
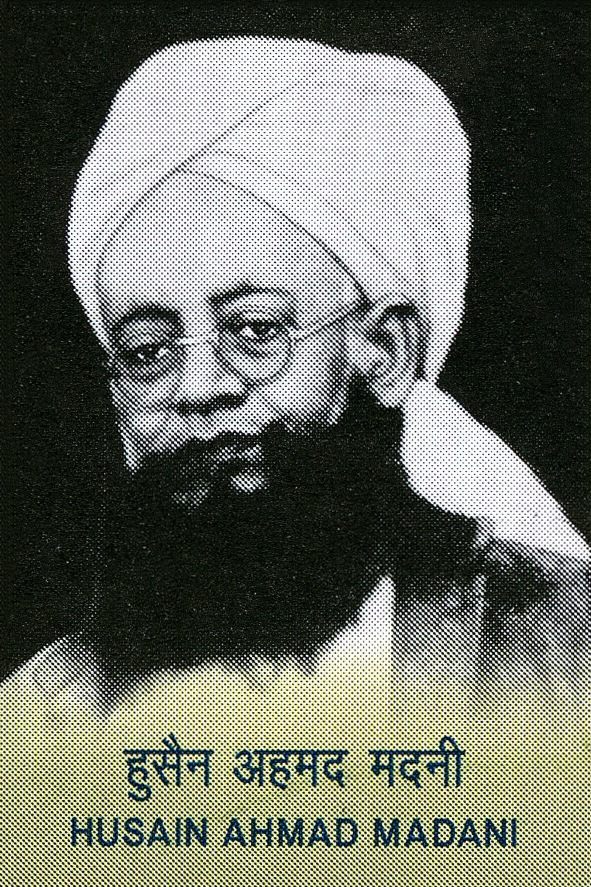
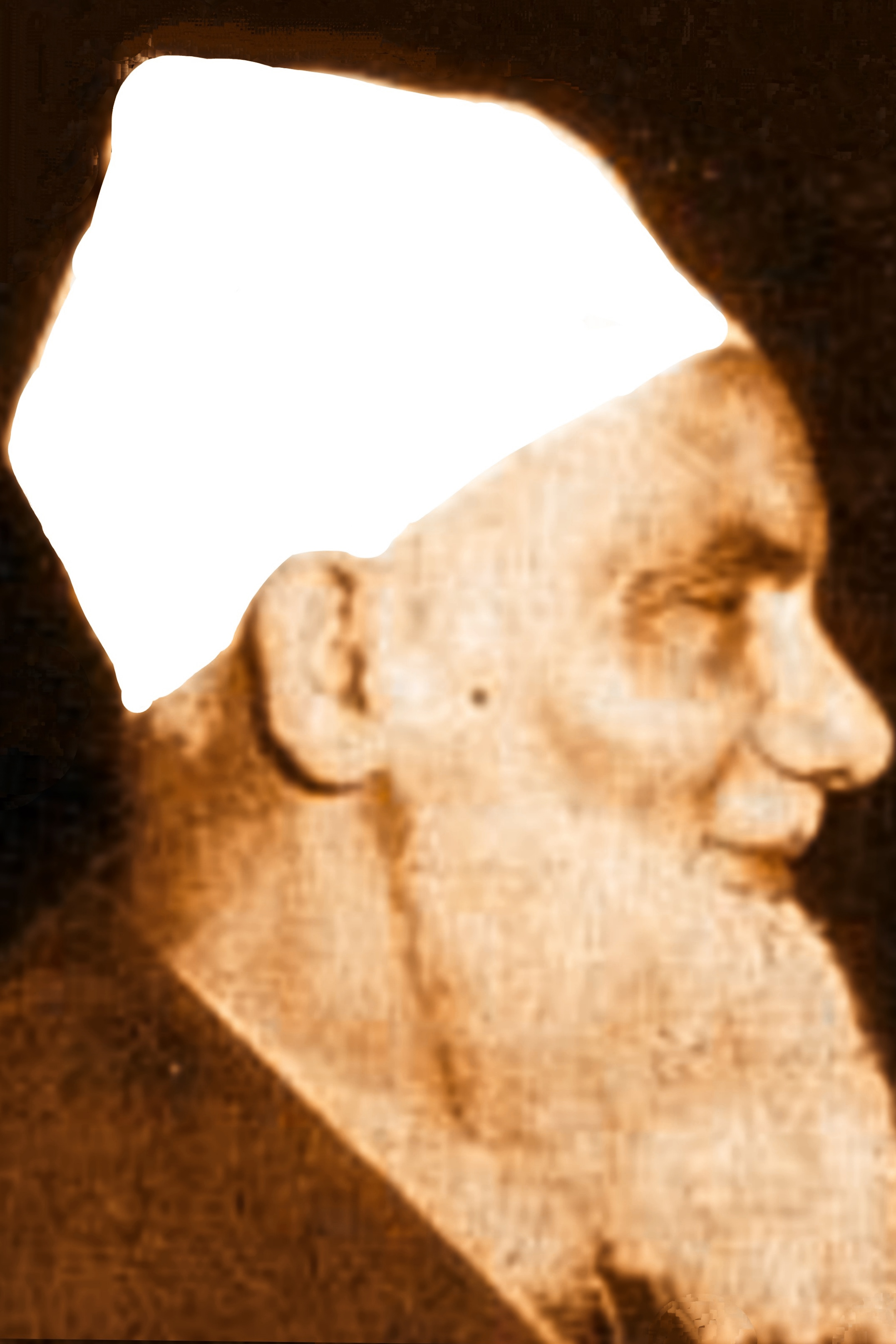
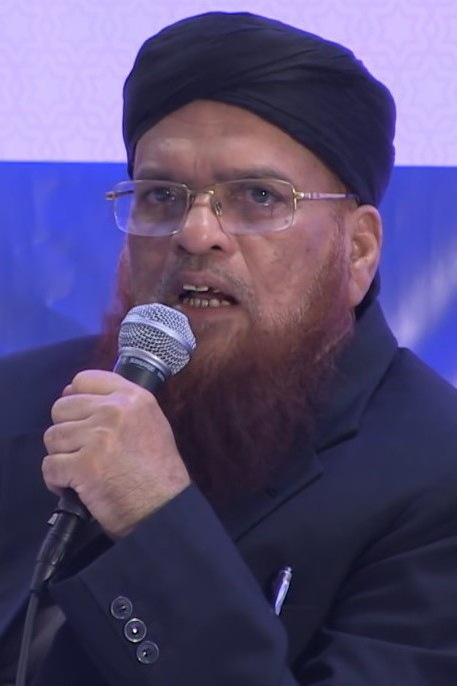
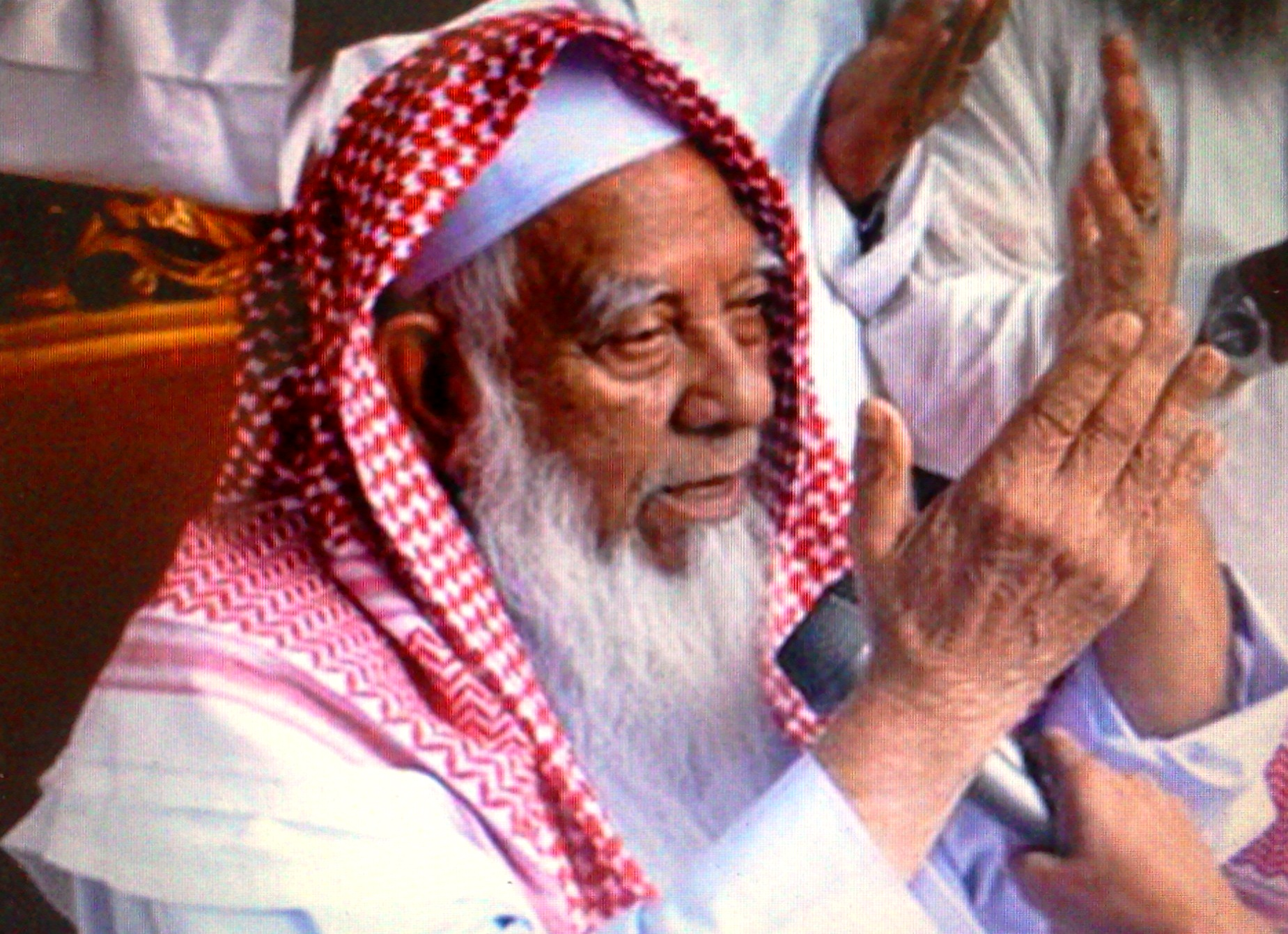
- Clockwise from top: Darul Uloom Deoband, Hussain Ahmad Madani, Taqi Usmani, Shah Ahmad Shafi, Shabbir Ahmad Usmani, Mahmud Hasan Deobandi
- Type: Islamic revivalist movement
- Classification: Islam
- Orientation: Sunni, Sufi
- Theology: Maturidi
- Region: Primarily South Asia
- Headquarters: Darul Uloom Deoband
- Founder: List: Rashid Ahmad Gangohi; Muhammad Yaqub Nanawtawi; Rafiuddin Deobandi; Sayyid Muhammad Abid; Zulfiqar Ali Deobandi; Fazlur Rahman Usmani; Muhammad Qasim Nanawtawi
- Origin: 31 May 1866; 160 years ago Deoband, North-Western Provinces, British India (present-day Uttar Pradesh, India)
- Missionary organization: Tablighi Jamaat
- Publications: Al-Muhannad ala al-Mufannad

The Deobandi movement or Deobandism (Note: It is also referred to as the Deobandi school (of Islam), and the Deobandi sect. The practitioners of Deobandism however deny that it is a sect.) is a Sunni Islamic revivalist movement that traces its origins to the founding of the Darul Uloom madrasa in Deoband, British India in the late 19th century. The Deobandi movement's Indian clerical wing, Jamiat Ulema-e-Hind, was founded in 1919 and played a major role in the Indian independence movement through its participation in the pan-Islamist Khilafat movement and propagation of the doctrine of composite nationalism.

Deobandis are adherents of Sufism and the movement encompasses a variety of Sufi orders. They oppose folklore-based practices which they regard as superstitious and advocate for reform within Sufism. In terms of jurisprudence, the Deobandis uphold the doctrine of taqlid and adhere to one of the four Sunni madhahib (schools) – Hanafi, Maliki, Shafi'i, and Hanbali. Deobandis opposed the influence of non-Muslim cultures on the Muslims living in South Asia. The movement also contributed immensely to the revival of hadith studies, and many Deobandi hadith scholars wrote numerous authoritative and comprehensive commentaries.

The founders of the Deobandi school drew inspiration from the Sunni scholarly tradition of Madrasah-i Rahimiyya and were influenced by the teachings of the South Asian Sufi refomer and Islamic scholar Shah Waliullah Dehlawi. The movement pioneered religious education through the Dars-i Nizami associated with the Lucknow-based ulama of Firangi Mahal with the goal of preserving traditional Islamic teachings from the influx of modernist and secular ideas during British colonial rule. Politically, Deobandis were deeply connected to the pan-Islamist movements of Shah Waliullah Dehlawi, Sayyid Ahmad Barelvi's Tariqat-i Muhammadiyya, and the Silk Letter Movement in the subcontinent. The contemporary strands of the Deobandi movement are highly diverse, with many engaged in peaceful preaching and educational efforts, while others are militant. After the Soviet invasion of Afghanistan in 1979, several Deobandis volunteered to fight the Soviet military forces in Afghanistan and joined the Afghan mujahideen.

In its early years, Deobandi scholars engaged in theological debates with Christian and Hindu scholars with the objective of defending Islamic faith and advocating for the overthrow of British colonialism. Deobandi theologians of Jamiat Ulema-e-Hind, in particular, discussed multiculturalism and opposition to the partition of India, with a view to safeguarding the religious freedom of Muslims in India. On the other hand, Deobandi scholars of Jamiat Ulema-e-Islam, led by Shabbir Ahmad Usmani, played a leading role in the Pakistan Movement. Today, the movement has spread from India, Pakistan, and Bangladesh to various parts of the world.

== Foundation and expansion ==
British colonialism in India was seen by a group of Indian scholars—consisting of Rashid Ahmad Gangohi, Muhammad Yaqub Nanawtawi, Rafiuddin Deobandi, Sayyid Muhammad Abid, Zulfiqar Ali Deobandi, Fazlur Rahman Usmani and Muhammad Qasim Nanawtawi—to be corrupting Islam. The group founded an Islamic seminary (madrassa) known as Darul Uloom Deoband, where the Islamic revivalist and anti-imperialist ideology of the Deobandis began to develop. In time, the Darul Uloom Deoband became the second largest focal point of Islamic teaching and research after the Al-Azhar University, Cairo. Towards the time of the Indian independence movement and afterward in post-colonial India, the Deobandis advocated a notion of composite nationalism by which Muslims and Hindus were seen as one nation who were asked to be united in the struggle against the British rule.

In 1919, a large group of Deobandi scholars formed the political party Jamiat Ulema-e-Hind and opposed the partition of India. Deobandi scholar Hussain Ahmad Madani helped to spread these ideas through his text Muttahida Qaumiyat Aur Islam. A group later dissented from this position and joined Muhammad Ali Jinnah's Muslim League, including Ashraf Ali Thanwi, Shabbir Ahmad Usmani, Zafar Ahmad Usmani and Muhammad Shafi, who formed the Jamiat Ulema-e-Islam in 1945.

Through organizations including Jamiat Ulema-e-Hind and Tablighi Jamaat, the Deobandi movement began to spread. Graduates of Darul Uloom Deoband in India from countries such as South Africa, China, and Malaysia opened thousands of madaaris throughout the world.

=== India ===
The Deobandi movement in India is managed and spread by Darul Uloom Deoband and the Jamiat Ulema-e-Hind.

=== Pakistan ===
Of Pakistan's estimated 230 million Muslims, some 15-30% consider themselves Deobandi. According to Heritage Online, nearly 65% of the total seminaries (Madrasah) in Pakistan are run by Deobandis, whereas 25% are run by Barelvis, 6% by Ahl-i Hadith and 3% by various Shia organizations. The Deobandi movement in Pakistan was a major recipient of funding from Saudi Arabia from the early 1980s up until the early 2000s, where after this funding was diverted to the rival Ahl-i Hadith movement. Having seen Deoband as a counterbalance to Iranian influence in the region, Saudi funding is now strictly reserved for the Ahl-i Hadith.

Deobandi-affiliated groups such as the TTP, SSP, Let, etc. have a militant character and have attacked and destroyed Sufi sites holy to Sunni Muslims of the Barelvi movement, such as Data Darbar in Lahore, Abdullah Shah Ghazi's tomb in Karachi, Khal Magasi in Balochistan, and Rahman Baba's tomb in Peshawar.

=== Afghanistan ===
Deobandi is the most popular Islamic movement in the Pashtun belt on both sides of the Durand Line that separates Afghanistan and Pakistan. Moreover, prominent Afghan and Pakistani Taliban leaders have studied in Deobandi seminaries.

=== South Africa ===
The Deobandi Movement has an international presence today, with its full-fledged manifestation in South Africa, a country where the movement was initiated through the Indian Gujarati merchant class. The Islamic education system of the Deobandi movement, as well as the necessary components of social and political organisations such as the Tablighi Jamat and Jamiatul Ulama South Africa are fully functioning effectively in South Africa, as they do in India. Madrasas in South Africa provide Islamic higher education and are now centers for Islamic education for foreigners who are interested in receiving a Deobandi-style education. Many of their graduates, especially from Western countries such as the United Kingdom and the United States, are Western students. Some of South African madrasas are recognized globally, providing fatwa services. South Africa is now known for producing exceptional Islamic literature through translation and compilation. Similarly, the Tabligh Jamaat is a hub in South Africa that spreads throughout South and East Africa. Graduates of South African madrassas spend their time in service of the Tablighi Jamaat, among them are Zakariyya Kandhlawi, Masihullah Khan, Mahmood Hasan Gangohi and Asad Madni. South African Deobandi Muslims have many important and influential educational and socio-political organisations that educate the people and play an important role in religious and social activities. Among them are Jamiatul Ulama South Africa and the Muslim Judicial Council.

=== Iran ===
Students from various regions, including Sistan and Baluchestan in Iran, attended Deoband, which led to the spread of its founders ideas. This movement had a significant impact on some of the new generation of Iranian intellectuals in the late 19th and early 20th centuries. After entering Iran, the students of this school continued to expand this thinking and with the formation of missionary groups. These thoughts have been strengthened on one hand due to the cultural relationships between the Baloch tribes and on the other hand due to the connection of Sistan and Baluchestan's Iran and India's Hanafi religious leaders in Iran. Today, Deobandi thinking is one of the intellectual currents in Sistan and Baluchestan and preaching groups are active in different cities and villages. Its playing a crucial role in Iran's political landscape. The Deobandis aimed to homogenise religious schools and were opposed to certain popular practices. The Naqshbandi order played an important role for the Deobandi movement in the Persian-speaking world.

=== United Kingdom ===
In the 1970s, Deobandis opened the first British-based Muslim religious seminaries (Darul-Ulooms), educating imams and religious scholars. Deobandis "have been quietly meeting the religious and spiritual needs of a significant proportion of British Muslims, and are perhaps the most influential British Muslim group." In 2007, the Deobandis ran 17 seminaries (out of a total of 26 in the UK) and were producing 80 percent of home-trained Muslim clerics. They also ran 600 of Britain's nearly 1,500 mosques. In 2014 it was reported that 45 per cent of Britain's mosques and nearly all the UK-based training of Islamic scholars were controlled by the Deobandis.

Journalist Andrew Norfolk found that the leading Deobandi preacher loathed western values, called on Muslims to "shed blood" for Allah and preached contempt for Jews, Christians and Hindus. In 2015 Ofsted highlighted the Deobandi seminary in Holcombe as a good example of a school "promoting British values, preventing radicalisation and protecting children". Norfolk disagreed with the assessment.

== Beliefs ==
With its roots in Islamic scholastic traditions of Mughal India and pre-modern Afghanistan, the Deobandi movement traces its lineage to the Sunni revivalist movements of Shah Waliullah Dehlawi and his successors, including Shah Abdul Aziz, Shah Muhammad Ishaq, and Shah Ismail Dehlvi. Scholars of the Deobandi movement view themselves as the spiritual heirs of Shah Waliullah Dehlawi, with early Deobandi leaders actively reviving his Sufi reformist teachings. Shah Waliullah Dehlawi was a contemporary of Muhammad ibn Abd al-Wahhab, and they studied in Medina under some of the same teachers. Muhammad Iqbal said: "The Deobandi movement is neither a creed (Aqidah) nor a denomination (Tayifa)–terms by which its antagonists try to incite the masses against it–but it is a comprehensive picture and a complete edition of the tack of the Ahl al-Sunnah wal-Jama'ah in which all the offshoots of the Ahl al-Sunnah wal-Jama'ah are seen joined with their root."

=== Theology ===
Deobandis follow the Maturidi school of Sunni Islamic theology. Their schools teach a short text on beliefs known as al-'Aqa'id al-Nasafiyya by the Hanafi-Maturidi scholar Najm al-Din 'Umar al-Nasafi. The official Deobandi book, al-Muhannad 'ala al-Mufannad (The Sword on the Disproved), also known as: al-Tasdiqat li-Daf' al-Talbisat (Endorsements Repelling Deceits), is a work that summarises the beliefs generally held by the Deobandis. It was authored by Khalil Ahmad al-Saharanpuri (d. 1346/1927) in order to defend and remit the Deobandis from the charge of kufr (unbelief or blasphemy) levied against them by their opponents.

According to Brannon D. Ingram, Deobandis differ from Barelvis on three theological positions. Gangohi said God has the ability to lie. The doctrine is called Imkan-i Kizb. According to this doctrine, because God is omnipotent, God is capable of lying. Gangohi also supported the doctrine that God has the ability to make additional prophets after Muhammad (Imkan-i Nazir) and other prophets equal to Muhammad. Gangohi clarifies that although God has the ability to make prophets on "par" with Muhammad, he "would never do so".

Some Deobandis, known as Mamati Deobandis, believe that the Prophet is not alive in his grave. This contrasts with the Hayati Deobandis and Barelvis who believe that he is alive in his grave.

=== Fiqh (Islamic jurisprudence) ===
Deobandis are strong proponents of the doctrine of Taqlid. In other words, they believe that a Deobandi must adhere to one of the four schools (madhhabs) of Sunni Islamic Law and discourage inter-school eclecticism. They themselves claim to be the followers of the Hanafi school. Students at madrasas affiliated with the Deobandi movement study the classic books of Hanafi Law such as Nur al-Idah, Mukhtasar al-Quduri, Sharh al-Wiqayah, and Kanz al-Daqa'iq, culminating their study of the madhhab with the Hidayah of al-Marghinani.

With regard to views on Taqlid, one of their main opposing reformist groups are the Ahl-i-Hadith, also known as the Ghair Muqallid, the nonconformists, because they eschewed taqlid in favor of the direct use of Quran and Hadith. They often accuse those who adhere to the rulings of one scholar or legal school of blind imitation, and frequently demand scriptural evidence for every argument and legal ruling. Almost since the very beginnings of the movement, Deobandi scholars have generated a copious amount of scholarly output in an attempt to defend their adherence to a madhhab in general. In particular, Deobandis have penned much literature in defense of their argument that the Hanafi madhhab is in complete accordance with the Quran and Hadith.

=== Hadith ===
In response to this need to defend their madhhab in the light of scripture, Deobandis became particularly distinguished for their unprecedented salience to the study of Hadith in their madrasas. Their madrasa curriculum incorporates a feature unique among the global arena of Islamic scholarship, the Daura-e Hadis, the capstone year of a student's advanced madrasa training, in which all six canonical collections of the Sunni Hadith (the Sihah Sittah) are reviewed.

In a Deobandi madrasa, the position of Shaykh al-Hadith, or the resident professor of Sahih Bukhari, is held in much reverence. Their views were widely shared by a broad range of Islamic reform movements of the colonial period.

=== Sufism ===
Khalil Ahmad Saharanpuri outlined the creedal beliefs of Deobandis in his Al-Muhannad ala al-Mufannad:

Our way is following the greatest Imam, Abu Hanifa al-Nu'man – Allah Exalted is He be pleased with him – in the peripherals; and followers of the noble Imam Abu al-Hasan al-Ash'ari and the noble Imam Abu Mansur al-Maturidi (Allah be pleased with them) in creed and the fundamentals; and that we are adherents to the following Sufi ways: the most distinguished way of the Naqshbandi masters, the most pure way of the Chishti masters, the most glorious way of the Qadiri masters, and the most radiant way of the Suhrawardi masters (Allah be pleased with them all). — Al-Muhannad 'ala al-Mufannad (Questions One and Two)

The founding leaders of the Deobandi movement drew on and popularized Shah Waliullah Dehlawi's criticism of certain folk rituals and practices that had crept into Sufi circles during the preceding century. Inspired by Shah Waliullah Dehlawi's Sufi reformist teachings, Deobandis are strictly opposed to excessive celebratory rituals during the Mawlid (celebration of the birthday of Muhammad), elaborate festivities during the urs (annual remembrance of the date of death of notable religious figures), and mourning of Muharram. Deobandis also reject the construction of maqams (structures over graves) and ziyarat (pilgrimage) to them. They further oppose certain practices associated with dervishes such as the singing of qawwalis, and performing sama, which are used to achieve wajd (religious ecstacy), as they believe these are bid'ah ("forbidden religious innovations"). Deobandis also oppose certain forms of istighatha practices.

Deoband's curriculum combined the study of Islamic holy books (the Quran, hadith and religious law) with rational subjects (logic, philosophy, and science). At the same time, it was strongly Sufi in orientation and affiliated with the Chishti Order. Taqi Usmani, the most famous Deobandi scholar, was trained as a Chishti, as were the four founders of the Deoband madrasa. Mahmood Ashraf Usmani, the former head of Darul Ulum Karachi, defended the concept of tariqa and bay'ah based on the incident of the Pledge of the Tree. Ashraf Ali Thanwi graduated from Darul Uloom Deoband and was widely considered a preeminent Sufi of modern India. The founders of the Deobandi school, Qasim Nanawtawi and Rashid Ahmad Gangohi, were inspired by the doctrine of Shah Waliullah Dehlawi and other sources. Gangohi studied under the Sufi shaykh Imdadullah Muhajir Makki, although he differed with him on many points. However Gangohi's Fatawa-yi Rashidiyya rejected Sufi practices.

Gangohi opposed the Sufi doctrine that Muhammad has knowledge of the unseen (ilm-e Ghayb). This belief of the Deobandis conflicts with traditional Sufi views of Muhammad having unparalleled and unequal knowledge that encompasses the unseen realm. Gangohi also issued multiple fatwas against Mawlid and stated it is bidʿah, and opposed the practice of standing up in honour of Muhammad during the day of Mawlid.

Zakariyya Kandhlawi, noted hadith scholar and Deobandi shaykh, stated,

The reality of "tasawwuf" is merely correction of intention. It begins with "actions are only according to intentions" and ends with "that you worship Him as if you see Him."

== Scholarship ==
=== Deobandi fiqh ===
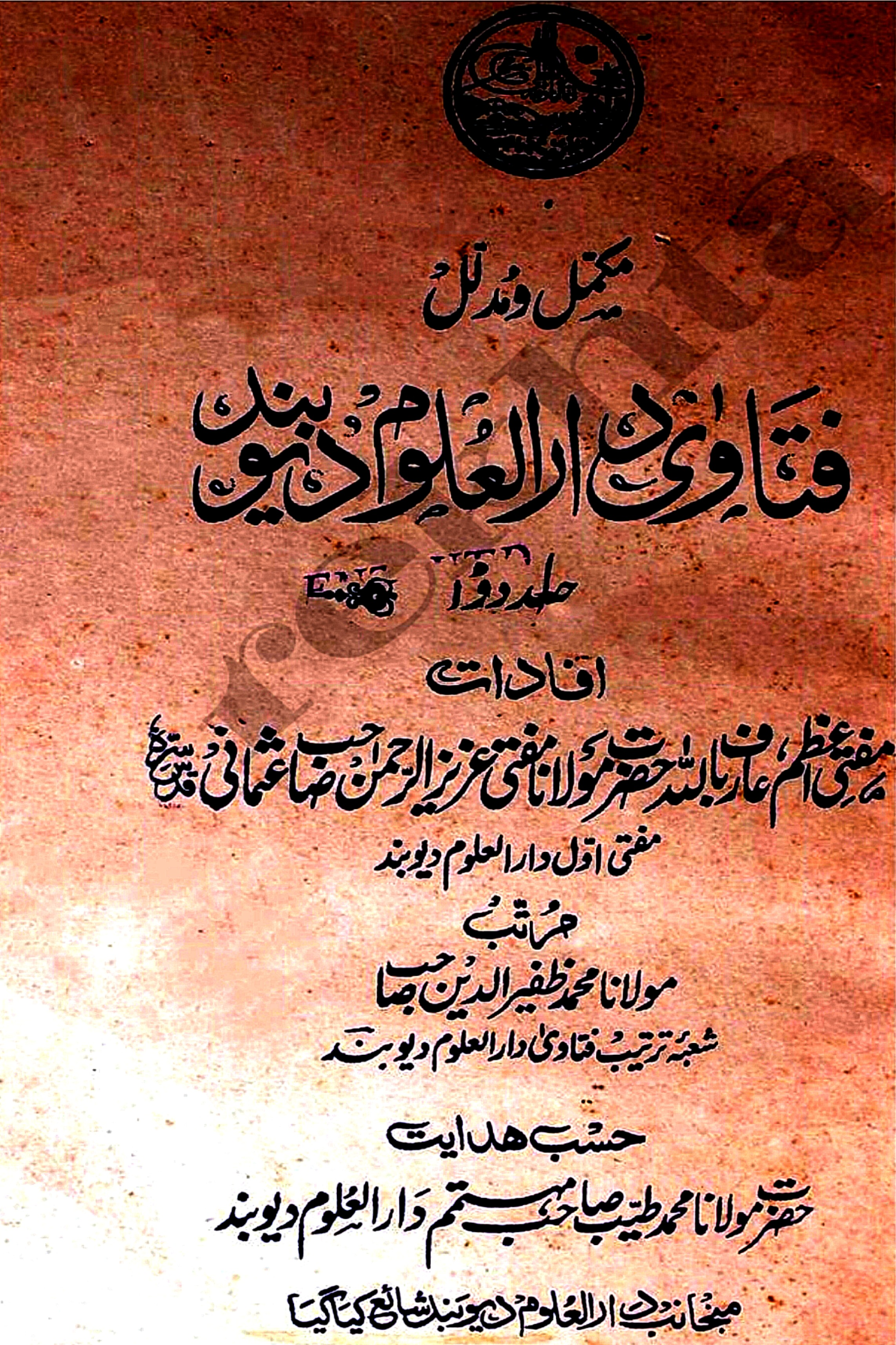
Fatawa Darul Uloom Deoband

Deobandi fiqh, originating from the Hanafi school of Islamic law, is a distinctive school of Islamic jurisprudence that highly values the strict adherence to the Hanafi school of jurisprudence, also known as Taqlid. Deobandi scholars view Taqlid as a crucial means of ensuring the proper interpretation and application of Islamic law, especially for individuals without the necessary knowledge and expertise to engage in Ijtihad. However, Ijtihad is also recognised as necessary for the evolution of Islamic law, but it should be approached with caution and respect for Islamic scholarship traditions. Darul Uloom Deoband established the first Department of Fatwa, or Darul Ifta, in 1892, followed by other Deobandi madrasas and organisations such as the Islamic Fiqh Academy (India), which constitute the bedrock for the development of the Deobandi fiqh. Rashid Ahmad Gangohi is considered the founder of Deobandi fiqh, with Ashraf Ali Thanwi and Aziz-ul-Rahman Usmani regarded as key figures. The earliest text of Deobandi fiqh is Fatawa-e-Rashidiya, with other important texts including Imdad-ul-Fatawa and Fatawa Darul Uloom Deoband. Deobandi fiqh plays a vital role in Afghanistan's judiciary system, with Taqi Usmani and Khalid Saifullah Rahmani recognised as prominent contemporary faqihs of the Deobandi school. Digital initiatives such as Darulifta-Deoband.com and Askimam demonstrate the digitisation of Deobandi fiqh. A significant fatwa in Deobandi fiqh is the Fatwa of Peace for Humanity, issued by Farid Uddin Masood in 2016, endorsed by over 100,000 Islamic scholars from Bangladesh, declaring terrorism as haram or forbidden, based on Islamic scripture and tradition.

== Politics ==
Deobandi politics is deeply influenced by the doctrines of the pan-Islamist movements of Shah Waliullah Dehlawi, Syed Ahmad Barelvi's Tariqa-i Muhammadiyyah, and the Silk Letter Movement in the subcontinent. The clerical movements led by Shah Waliullah Dehlawi and his followers viewed the decline of Muslim political power in India as a consequence of spiritual and moral degeneration, which they attributed to the corrupting influences of polytheistic practices from non-Muslim locals and foreign philosophical ideas. These scholars maintained that the ulema should take the vanguard role in actively organizing efforts to re-establish Islamic political power and issued fatawa independently of governmental institutions.

By the mid-19th century, Shah Muhammad Ishaq had trained a circle of influential students, including Mamluk Ali Nanautawi and Imdadullah Muhajir Makki, who mentored Muhammad Qasim Nanawtawi and Rashid Ahmad Gangohi. Their movement waged armed uprisings against the British and established an Islamic emirate in Thana Bhawan, but their forces were defeated at the Battle of Shamli. Hajji Imdadullah fled to Mecca and Gangohi was arrested by the British; Qasim Nanawtwi, however, managed to retreat to the town of Deoband where he was sheltered by his relatives.

Nanawtwi regarded British Christian rule as a decisive rupture in the Indian political system which was long dominated by Muslims. He envisioned the establishment of a seminary in Deoband as a means of cultivating a religious elite capable of restoring Islamic rule and enhancing the influence of the ulema in South Asia. Following Gangohi's release from imprisonment, the seminary of Darul Uloom Deoband was established in 1866. It emerged as the epicenter of an extensive network of affiliated madaris across the subcontinent.

=== Deobandi jihadism ===
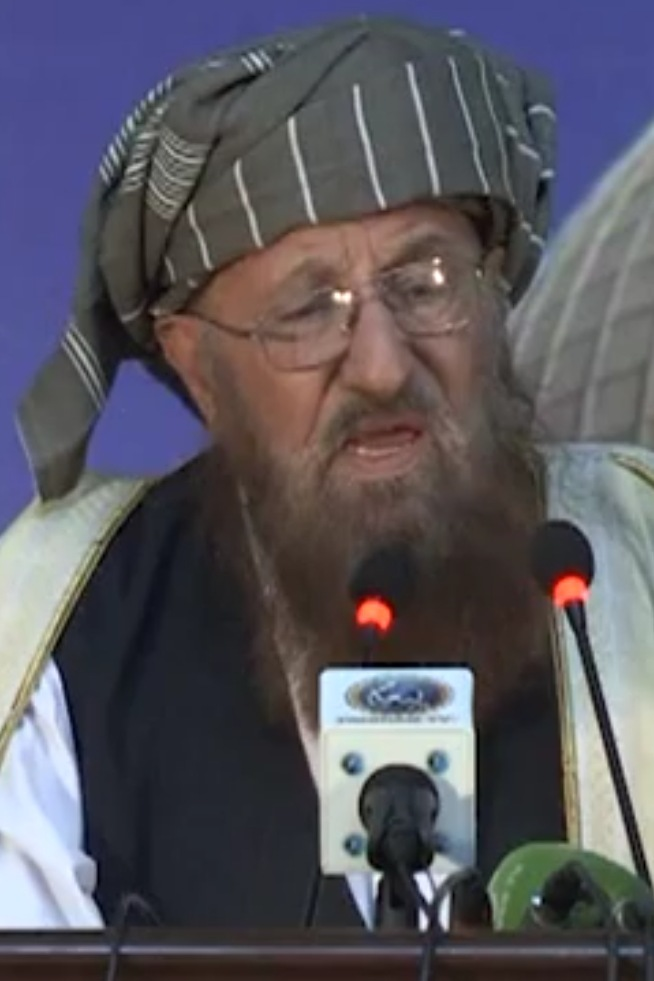
Sami-ul-Haq

Deobandi jihadism pertains to a militant interpretation of Islam that draws upon the teachings of the Deobandi movement. The Deobandi movement underwent three waves of armed conflict. The first wave resulted in the establishment of an Islamic territory centered on Thana Bhawan by the movement's elders during the Indian Rebellion of 1857, prior to the founding of Darul Uloom Deoband. Imdadullah Muhajir Makki served as the Amir al-Mu'minin of this Islamic territory, Rashid Ahmad Gangohi as the Chief justice, and Muhammad Qasim Nanautavi as the Commander-in-chief. However, following the British victory over the Deobandi forces in the Battle of Shamli, the territory fell. After the establishment of Darul Uloom Deoband, Mahmud Hasan Deobandi initiated the second wave. He attempted to mobilise an armed resistance against the British through various initiatives, including the formation of the Samratut Tarbiat. When the British uncovered his Silk Letter Movement, they arrested him and held him captive in Malta. Following his release, he and his followers entered mainstream politics and actively participated in the democratic process. In the late 1970s, the Pakistan–Afghan border became the epicenter of the Deobandi jihadist movement's third wave, which was fueled by the Soviet–Afghan War. Under the auspices of President Muhammad Zia-ul-Haq, its expansion occurred through various madrasas, such as Darul Uloom Haqqania and Jamia Uloom-ul-Islamia, with political support provided by Jamiat Ulema-e-Islam (S).

Trained militants from the Pakistan–Afghan border participated in the Afghan jihad and later formed various organisations. Deobandis were the most committed volunteers and enthusiastic participants in the Afghan Jihad against Soviets. Most of the traditional madaris in Pakistan that actively supported the Afghan Mujahideen were affiliated with the Deobandi school. The most prominent example of Deobandi jihadism is the Taliban, who established Islamic rule in Afghanistan. Sami-ul-Haq, the head of Jamiat Ulema-e-Islam (S), is regarded as the "father of the Taliban."

== Organisations ==
=== Jamiat Ulema-I-Hind ===
Jamiat Ulema-e-Hind is one of the leading Deobandi organisations in India. It was founded in British India in 1919 by Ahmad Saeed Dehlavi, Sanaullah Amritsari and several other scholars including Kifayatullah Dehlawi who was elected its first interim president. The Jamiat has propounded a theological basis for its nationalistic philosophy. Their thesis is that Muslims and non-Muslims have entered upon a mutual contract in India since independence, to establish a secular state. The Constitution of India represents this contract.

=== Jamiat Ulema-e-Islam ===
Jamiat Ulema-e-Islam (JUI) is a Deobandi organisation, part of the Deobandi movement. The JUI formed when members broke from the Jamiat Ulema-e-Hind in 1945 after that organisation backed the Indian National Congress against the Muslim League's lobby for a separate Pakistan. The first president of the JUI was Shabbir Ahmad Usmani.

=== Majlis-e-Ahrar-e-Islam ===
Majlis-e-Ahrar-e-Islam (Urdu: مجلس احرارلأسلام), also known in short as Ahrar, was a conservative Deobandi political party in the Indian subcontinent during the British Raj (prior to the independence of Pakistan) founded 29 December 1929 at Lahore. Chaudhry Afzal Haq, Syed Ata Ullah Shah Bukhari, Habib-ur-Rehman Ludhianvi, Mazhar Ali Azhar, Zafar Ali Khan and Dawood Ghaznavi were the founders of the party. The Ahrar was composed of Indian Muslims disillusioned by the Khilafat Movement, which cleaved closer to the Congress Party. The party was associated with opposition to Muhammad Ali Jinnah and against establishment of an independent Pakistan as well as criticism of the Ahmadiyya movement. After the independence of Pakistan in 1947, Majlis-e-Ahrar divided in two parts. Now, Majlis-e-Ahrar-e-Islam is working for the sake of Muhammad, nifaaz Hakomat-e-illahiyya and Khidmat-e-Khalq. In Pakistan, Ahrar secretariat is in Lahore and in India it is based in Ludhiana.

=== Tablighi Jamaat ===
Tablighi Jamaat, a non-political Deobandi missionary organisation, began as an offshoot of the Deobandi movement. Its inception is believed to be a response to Hindu reform movements, which were considered a threat to vulnerable and non-practising Deobandi Muslims. It gradually expanded from a local to a national organisation, and finally to a transnational movement with followers in over 200 countries. Although its beginnings were from the Deobandi movement, it has now established an independent identity though it still maintains close ties with Deobandi ulema in many countries with large South Asian Muslim populations such as the UK.

=== Associated organisations ===
- Jamiat Ulema-e-Hind
- Jamiatul Ulama South Africa
- Jamiat Ulama-e-Britain
- Jam'iyyatul Ulama Canada
- Jamiat-Ul-Ulama of Mauritius
- Majlisul Ulama Zimbabwe
- Jamiat Ulema-e-Islam
- Jamiat Ulema-e-Islam Bangladesh
- Jamiat Ulama-Nepal
- Majlis-e-Ahrar-ul-Islam
- Sipah-e-Sahaba Pakistan
- Islami Andolan Bangladesh
- Hefazat-e-Islam Bangladesh
- Muslim Union Party
- All Ceylon Jamiyyathul Ulama
- Aalmi Majlis Tahaffuz Khatm-e-Nubuwwat

=== Associated militant organisations ===
==== Lashkar-e-Jhangvi ====
Lashkar-e-Jhangvi (LJ) (Army of Jhangvi) was a Deobandi militant organisation. Formed in 1996, it operated in Pakistan as an offshoot of Sipah-e-Sahaba (SSP). Riaz Basra broke away from the SSP over differences with his seniors. The group, now practically defunct since the unsuccessful Operation Zarb-e-Azab, is considered a terrorist group by Pakistan and the United States, It was involved in attacks on civilians and protectors of them. Lashkar-e-Jhangvi is predominantly Punjabi. The group has been labelled by intelligence officials in Pakistan as a major security threat.

==== Taliban ====
The Taliban ("students"), alternative spelling Taleban, is an Islamic fundamentalist political and militant movement in Afghanistan. It spread into Afghanistan and formed a government, ruling as the Islamic Emirate of Afghanistan from September 1996 until December 2001, with Kandahar as the capital. While in power, it enforced its strict interpretation of Sharia law. While many leading Muslims and Islamic scholars have been highly critical of the Taliban's interpretations of Islamic law, the Darul Uloom Deoband has consistently supported the Taliban in Afghanistan, including their 2001 destruction of the Buddhas of Bamiyan, and the majority of the Taliban's leaders were influenced by Deobandi fundamentalism. Pashtunwali, the Pashtun tribal code, also played a significant role in the Taliban's legislation. The Taliban were condemned internationally for their brutal treatment of women.

==== Tehrik-i-Taliban Pakistan ====
Tehrik-i-Taliban Pakistan (the TTP), alternatively referred to as the Pakistani Taliban, is an umbrella organisation of various Islamist militant groups based in the northwestern Federally Administered Tribal Areas along the Afghan border in Pakistan. In December 2007 about 13 groups united under the leadership of Baitullah Mehsud to form the Tehrik-i-Taliban Pakistan. Among the Tehrik-i-Taliban Pakistan's stated objectives are resistance against the Pakistani state, enforcement of their interpretation of sharia and a plan to unite against NATO-led forces in Afghanistan.

The TTP is not directly affiliated with the Afghan Taliban movement led by Mullah Omar, with both groups differing greatly in their histories, strategic goals and interests although they both share a primarily Deobandi interpretation of Islam and are predominantly Pashtun.

==== Sipah-e-Sahaba ====
Sipah-e-Sahaba Pakistan (SSP) is a banned Pakistani militant organisation, and a formerly registered Pakistani political party. Established in the early 1980s in Jhang by the militant leader Haq Nawaz Jhangvi, its stated goal is primarily to deter major Shiite influence in Pakistan in the wake of the Iranian Revolution. The organisation was banned by President Pervez Musharraf in 2002 as being a terrorist group under the Anti-Terrorism Act of 1997. In October 2000 Masood Azhar, another militant leader, and founder of Jaish-e-Mohammed (JeM), was quoted as saying that "Sipah-e-Sahaba stands shoulder to shoulder with Jaish-e-Muhammad in Jehad." A leaked U.S. diplomatic cable described JeM as "another SSP breakaway Deobandi organisation."

== Institutions ==
Right after Darul Uloom Deoband, the main center of Deobandism throughout the world, Mazahir Uloom, Saharanpur is the second known Deobandi madrassa in India, which produced the scholars like Zakariyya Kandhlawi. Muhammad Qasim Nanautavi's established Madrasa Shahi, Moradabad, the alma of scholars like Mufti Mahmud and Saeed Ahmad Akbarabadi has its position. Darul Uloom Karachi, founded by Muhammad Shafi, Jamia Binoria and Jamia Uloom-ul-Islamia in Pakistani are top Deobandi institutions there. Darul Uloom Bury, Holcombe, established by Yusuf Motala during 1970s is the first Deobandi madrassa of the West In South Africa, Darul Ulum Newcastle, was founded in 1971 by Cassim Mohammed Sema and Dar al-Ulum Zakariyya in Lenasia, Madrasah In'aamiyyah, Camperdown is known for its Dar al-Iftaa (Department of Fatwa Research and Training) which runs the popular online fatwa service, Askimam.org. Al-Jamiatul Ahlia Darul Ulum Moinul Islam is the first established Deobandi madrassa in Bangladesh, which produced the scholars like Shah Ahmad Shafi, Junaid Babunagari. Al-Rashid Islamic Institute, Ontario, Canada, Darul Uloom Al-Madania in Buffalo, New York, Jamiah Darul Uloom Zahedan in Iran and Darul Uloom Raheemiyyah are some top Deobandi institutions. As of 2026, nearly 60 percent of the students currently studying in Qawmi madrasahs worldwide are in Bangladesh.

== Notable members ==
- Mahmud Deobandi (died 1886) – First teacher of Darul Uloom Deoband.
- Mahmud Hasan Deobandi (1851–1920) – Popularly known as "Shaykh al-Hind".
- Ashraf Ali Thanwi (1863–1943)
- Ubaidullah Sindhi (1863–1943) – Indian independence activist and Life Member of Jamia Millia Islamia.
- Anwar Shah Kashmiri (1875–1933)
- Hussain Ahmad Madani (1879–1957)
- Muhammad Ilyas al-Kandhlawi (1884–1944) – Founder of Tablighi Jamaat.
- Shabbir Ahmad Usmani (1887–1949)
- Uzair Gul Peshawari (1886–1989), Indian independence activist and former head of Madrasa Rahmania in Roorkee.
- Muhammad Shafi (1897–1976)
- Majid Ali Jaunpuri (died 1935), He was regarded as an authority in logic and philosophy and authored marginal notes on major hadith collections.
- Zakariyya Kandhlawi (1898–1982)
- Zayn al-Abidin Sajjad Meerthi (1910–1991), former head of the Islamic studies department of Jamia Millia Islamia.
- Abdul Matin Chowdhury (1915–1990)
- Fazlul Karim (1935–2006)
- Shah Ahmad Shafi (1916–2020), former Chief of Hefajat-e-Islam Bangladesh, rector of Al-Jamiatul Ahlia Darul Ulum Moinul Islam Hathazari and also the chairman of Bangladesh Qawmi Madrasah Education Board.
- Abdur Rahman Bangladeshi (1920–2015) – He was the founder director of Islamic Research Center Bangladesh, Dhaka & Many Deobandi school. Ex chairman of the Shariah Council of Many Islamic Bank.
- Muhammad Abdul Wahhab (1923–2018) – former Amir of the Tablighi Jamaat Pakistan Chapter.
- Nur Uddin Gohorpuri (1924–2005)
- Khalid Mahmood (1925–2020) – UK. He was the founder and Director of The Islamic Academy of Manchester. which was established in 1974. He served formerly as a Professor at Murray College Sialkot and also at MAO College Lahore. He obtained a PhD in Comparative Religion from University of Birmingham in 1970. He has authored over 50 books, and has served as the Justice of Supreme court of Pakistan (Shariat Appellate Bench).
- Muhammad Yunus Jownpuri (1937-2017) – Senior Hadith Scholar and former Shaykh al-Hadith of Mazahir Uloom, Saharanpur. He was among the senior students and disciples of Zakariyya Kandhlawi.
- Usman Mansoorpuri (1944-2021) – First National President of Jamiat Ulama-e-Hind's Mahmood faction.
- Yusuf Motala (1946–2019) – UK; Founder and senior lecturer at Dar al-Ulum Bury, one of the oldest Deobandi Madrasas in the West; "He is a scholar's scholar – many of the United Kingdom's young Deobandi scholars have studied under his patronage."
- Nur Hossain Kasemi (1945–2020) – Former Secretary General of Hefazat-e-Islam Bangladesh.
- Ebrahim Desai, South Africa – Mufti and founder of Askimam fatwa portal (1963–2021).
- Taha Karaan, South African scholar and jurist (1969–2021).

=== Contemporary Deobandis ===
- Mahmudul Hasan, Bangladesh – President of Al-Haiatul Ulya Lil-Jamiatil Qawmia Bangladesh and Befaqul Madarisil Arabia Bangladesh, Chancellor of Jamia Islamia Darul Uloom Madania, Amir of Majlis-e-Dawatul Haq Bangladesh.
- Syed Rezaul Karim Vice President of Al-Haiatul Ulya Lil-Jamiatil Qawmia Bangladesh and Befaqul Madarisil Arabia Bangladesh, Amir of Islami Andolan Bangladesh, President of the Bangladesh Mujahid Committee and Bangladesh Quran Education Board.
- A F M Khalid Hossain – Bangladeshi Islamic Scholar.
- Abdul Halim Bukhari, Bangladesh – Chancellor of Al Jamia Al Islamia Patiya.
- Hibatullah Akhundzada, supreme leader of Afghanistan.
- Junaid Babunagari, Bangladeshi Islamic Scholar, He is serving as the assistant director of Al-Jamiatul Ahlia Darul Ulum Moinul Islam Hathazari, and secretary general of Hefajat-e-Islam Bangladesh.
- Syed Faizul Karim Senior Vice President of Islami Andolan Bangladesh. He is also the Vice President of Bangladesh Mujahid Committee and Bangladesh Quran Education Board and Central Member of Befaqul Madarisil Arabia Bangladesh
- Mamunul Haque – Secretary General of Bangladesh Khelafat Majlish and President of Bangladesh Khelafat Youth Majlish.
- Muhibbullah Babunagari, Chief advisor of Hefazat-e-Islam Bangladesh (born 1935)
- Rafi Usmani, Pakistan – Former President and senior lecturer of Darul Uloom Karachi.
- Taqi Usmani, Pakistan – Vice-president of Dar al-Ulum Karachi, Former judge on the Shariah Appellate Bench of the Supreme Court of Pakistan, Deputy Chairman of the Islamic Fiqh Academy of the OIC, leading scholar of Islamic Finance, and often considered to be a leading scholar and figurehead of the Deobandi movement.
- Maulana Fazlur Rehman, Pakistan – President of Jamiat Ulema-e-Islam (F).
- Nurul Islam Jihadi, Secretary General of Hefazat-e-Islam Bangladesh. (born 1948)
- Allama Nurul Islam Olipuri – Mufassir from Bangladesh.
- Tariq Jameel, Pakistan – Prominent scholar and preacher in the Tablighi Jama'at.
- Ismail ibn Musa Menk, Zimbabwean scholar.
- Abdur Rahman ibn Yusuf Mangera, Mufti and founder of Whitethread Institute and Zamzam Academy.
- Muhammad Sufyan Qasmi, current rector of Darul Uloom Waqf, Deoband.
- Rahmatullah Mir Qasmi, founder and rector of Darul Uloom Raheemiyyah.
- Mahfuzul Haque, secretary general of Befaqul Madarisil Arabia Bangladesh.
- Muhammad ibn Adam Al-Kawthari, founder and chief-Mufti of Darul Ifta Leicester.
- Abdolhamid Ismaeelzahi, Iraninan Sunni Scholar who is regarded as a "spiritual leader for Iran's Sunni Muslim population".
- Yasir Nadeem al Wajidi, Chicago-based Indian Scholar and the founder of Darul Uloom Online.
- Zulfiqar Ahmad, Pakistani Islamic scholar and Sufi Shaykh.

== Bibliography of the movement ==
- Islamic Revival in British India
- Revival from Below
- The Deoband School And The Demand For Pakistan
- A Special Issue on The Deoband Madrasa, The Muslim World

== See also ==
- Index of Deobandi movement–related articles
