= Aashiq Elahi Meerthi =

Islamic scholar, biographer, translator and writer (1881 - 1941)

Muhammad Aashiq Ilahi Meerthi
- عاشق الہی میرٹھی

Personal life
- Born: 1881 Meerut, India
- Died: 1941 (aged 59–60)
- Notable work(s): Tazkiraturrashid, A Gift for Muslim Women, Islām-i mukammal, Dadhi Ki Qadr-o-Qimat, Behtareen Jahez, Makatib-e-Rashidiyah, Qissa Yusuf, Wasl-ul-Habeeb
- Occupation: Islamic scholar, biographer, translator, writer

Religious life
- Religion: Islam

Senior posting
- Students: Izaz Ali Amrohi
- Influenced: Rashid Ahmad Gangohi

Muhammad Aashiq Ilahi Meerthi (عاشق الہی میرٹھی 1881 - 1941) was an Islamic scholar, biographer, translator and writer who served as a member of the executive council of the Mazahir Uloom alongside others. He also wrote a commentary on Quran called Tafsir Meerthi.

Meerathi was born in 1881 in Meerut, India.

== Literary works ==
Aashiq Elahi Meerthi's writings often focused on Islamic teachings and biographies of prominent Islamic figures. Some of them are:

- Tafseer e Merathi
- Tazkiraturrashid 1977, 2 vol - a biography of Rashid Ahmad Gangohi
- تحفه خواتين/A Gift for Muslim Women
- Islām-i mukammal
- Dadhi Ki Qadr-o-Qimat 1966
- Behtareen Jahez
- Makatib-e-Rashidiyah
- Qissa Yusuf
- Wasl-ul-Habeeb

=== Translated works ===
- Fuyooz-e-Yazdani Al-Fath-ur-Rabbani 1976
- Tabrez Tarjuma-e-Abrez Part-001
- Khutbat-e-Ghausiya 1958
- Imdad-us-Sulook Urdu Irshad-ul-Suluk Makhuz Az Risala-e-Makkiyya 2005

== Death ==
Aashiq Elahi Meerthi died in 1941.
