= Makrana marble =

Special marble found in Makrana, Rajasthan, India

Makrana marble is a type of white marble, popular for use in sculpture and building decor. It is mined in the town of Makrana in Rajasthan, India, and was used in the construction of several iconic monuments such as the Ram Mandir in Ayodhaya, Taj Mahal in Agra and Masjid-e-Rasheed in Deoband and the Victoria Memorial in Kolkata. The Makrana Marble is listed as a GHSR (Global Heritage Stone Resource) by International Union of Geological Sciences

== Geology ==
In the Makrana area, marble is found as five steeply-dipping bands. They form part of the Ajmer Formation of the Delhi Supergroup, which is a sequence of sedimentary rocks that was deposited in the Delhi Basin during the Proterozoic. About 1450 Ma (million years ago) these rocks were affected by the Delhi Orogeny, causing the metamorphism that transformed the original limestones to marble and the folding that caused the steep dip and the current outcrop pattern.

== Properties ==
Makrana is regarded as the oldest place in India with a marble quarry. Upon mining, Makrana marble is not subjected to any form of treatment, but used in cutting and chiseling straight away. Makrana marble is one of the two calcitic marble varieties in India, with all others being dolomitic. It has two varieties: white and albeta. The quantity of marble reserves in the region is estimated to be 55 million tonnes by the state government. About 120 thousand tonnes of the marble are produced annually from over 400 mines in the region.

Makrana marble has a high percentage of calcium and is therefore resistant to water seepage. The water absorption of Makrana marble is said to be the lowest among all types in India, and the marble is claimed to contain 98 percent of calcium carbonate and only two percent of impurities, this property of Makrana marble helps it to stay the same proportion of white for a long period of time and because it contains 98 percent of calcium the polish of this marble is considered in the best. The different shades of Makrana marble are pure white, white with grey shades and white with pink shades, depending on the level of impurities. The close interlocking property of the marble makes it strong, hard and translucent. It is said to retain its shine and white color for a long period of time.

== Types of Makrana Marble ==
Makrana Marbles splits into various categories according to its design and pattern. The following are marbles that are mined and manufactured at Makrana:

- Makrana White Marble
- Brown Albeta Marble
- Dungri Marble
- Albeta Marble
- Pink Marble

== Notable monuments and buildings ==
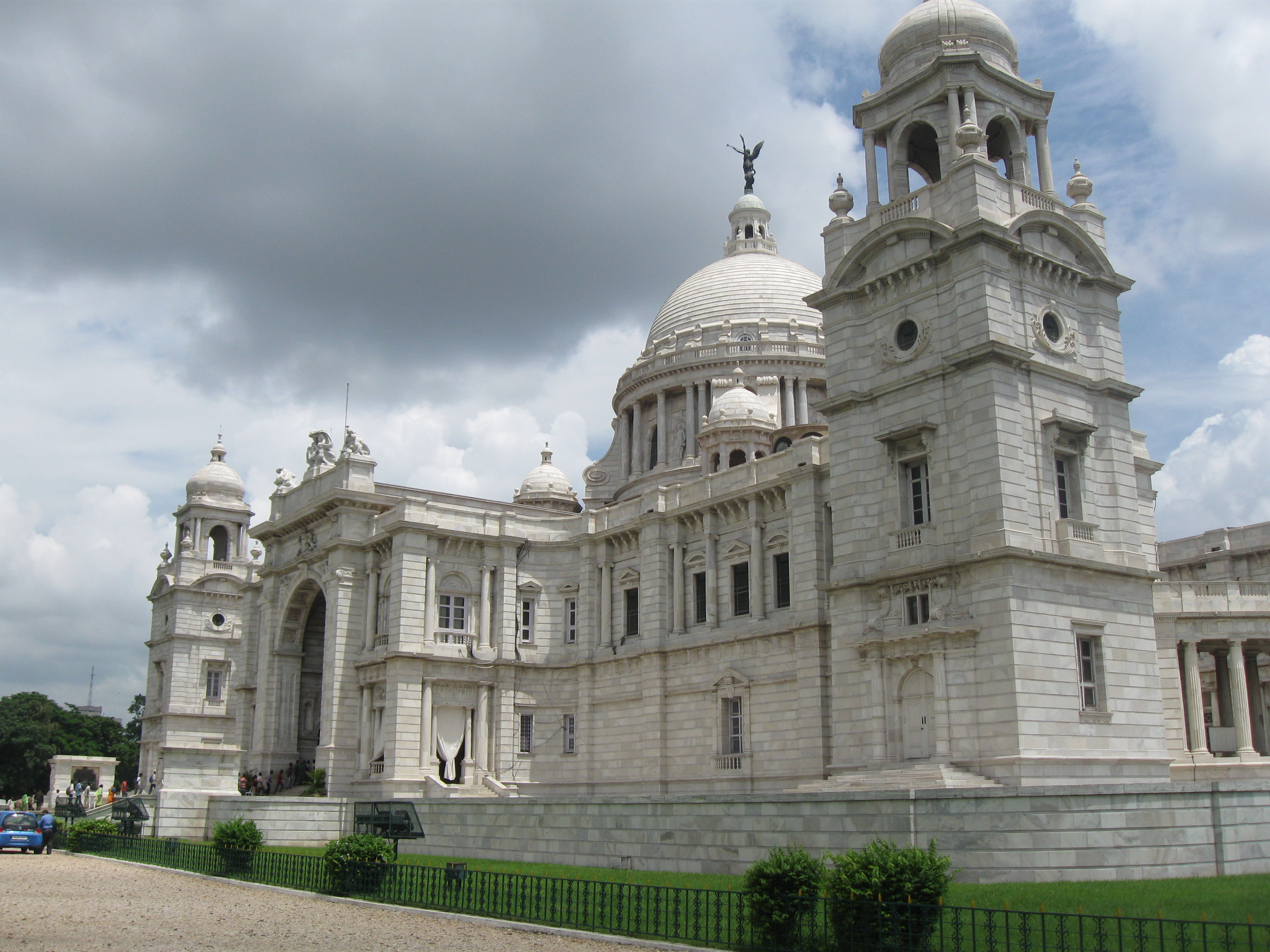
Victoria Memorial in Kolkata

Prominent buildings/monuments that used Makrana marble in their construction are:

- Taj Mahal, Agra, India
- Victoria Memorial, Kolkata, India – Makrana marble was chosen over various other European types in the construction of the Victoria Memorial, after several tests concluded Makrana marble to be superior. Sir Thomas Henry Holland, a British geologist, was given credit for recommending the use of Makrana marble in the construction of Victoria Memorial.
- Sheikh Zayed Grand Mosque, Abu Dhabi, UAE
- Moti Masjid, Lahore, Pakistan

== Use and export ==
Marble from Makrana is exported overseas mainly to the Persian Gulf countries, the European Union, Southeast Asia, Canada, Pakistan and Russia. In India, it is mainly used for handicraft and sculpture work, apart from construction of buildings. Makrana marble was given the geographical indication status in 2015 by the Geographical Indication Registry, Chennai.
