= Fatawa-e-Rashidiya =

1890s book by Rashid Ahmad Gangohi

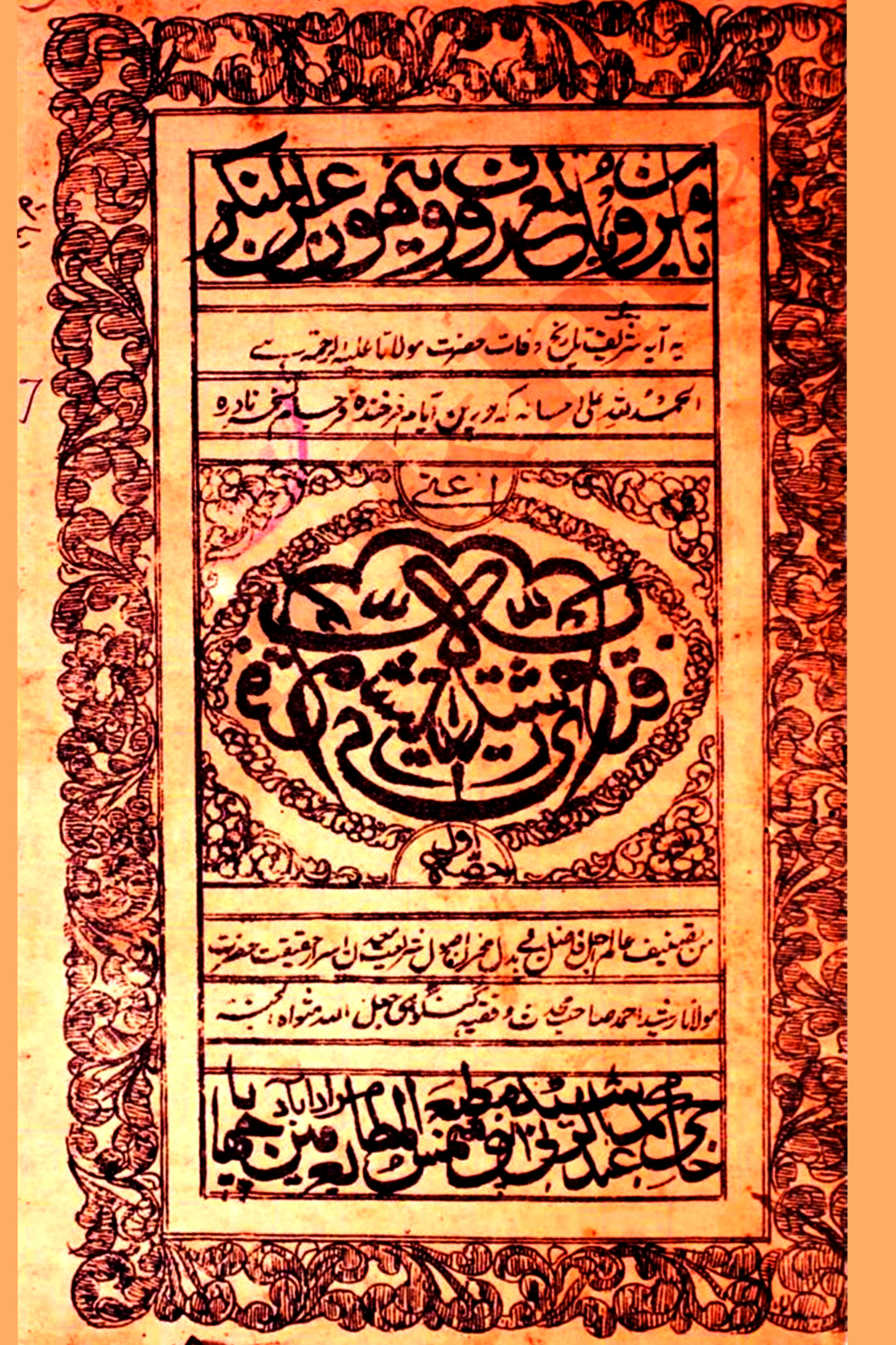
- Urdu cover
- Author: Rashid Ahmad Gangohi
- Language: Urdu
- Subject: Fiqh
- Genre: Fatwa
- Published: 1890s
- Publication place: British India
- Media type: Print
- Pages: 504
- OCLC: 31447224

Fatawa-e-Rashidiya is a collection of Islamic legal verdicts, or fatwas, written by the Indian scholar Rashid Ahmad Gangohi in the late 19th century. It contains over 2000 fatwas on various topics related to Islamic beliefs, practices, and customs, and played an important role in eradicating false innovations and un-Islamic customs from Muslim society. The collection was the first of its kind from any scholar of the Deobandi school of thought and is considered a significant work in the history of Islamic scholarship in the Indian subcontinent. It was originally published in three separate parts, but has since been combined into one volume. The fatwas were written during Rashid Ahmad Gangohi's tenure as the mufti (Islamic jurist) of the Darul Uloom Deoband, a prominent Islamic seminary in northern India, and cover a wide range of topics including religious beliefs, rituals, customs, and social issues. The fatwas are written in a concise and straightforward manner, without delving into detailed discussions or referencing the views of other Islamic scholars. It has been a valuable source of Islamic legal guidance for Muslims in the Indian subcontinent and beyond, and continues to be studied and referenced by scholars and students of Islamic law.

== Background ==
Fatwa is a legal opinion or ruling issued by a recognized Islamic authority on a particular issue or question. The concept of fatwa dates back to the early days of Islam when Muslims sought guidance from their religious leaders on various matters. In the Indian context, Darul Uloom Deoband has played a prominent role in the development and dissemination of Islamic jurisprudence and the issuance of fatwas.

Darul Uloom Deoband is a prominent Islamic seminary located in the town of Deoband, India. It was founded in 1866 by a group of Islamic scholars who were concerned about the spread of Western education and culture in India. They wanted to establish a traditional Islamic institution to counter it. The institution has produced many influential scholars who have contributed significantly to Islamic jurisprudence, including the issuance of fatwas. One such scholar is Rashid Ahmad Gangohi.

Rashid Ahmad Gangohi was considered an expert in Fiqh (Islamic jurisprudence) by his contemporaries and later scholars. He was proficient in writing Fatwas (Islamic legal opinions) and received queries from people even abroad. He was so skilled in Fiqh and Fatwa writing that he was referred to in many issues by Muhammad Qasim Nanautavi and Darul Uloom Deoband. Anwar Shah Kashmiri, a prominent Islamic scholar, called him Faqih al-Nafs (original jurist) and considered him even superior to Ibn Abidin, the author of the famous commentary of Radd al-Muhtar. Kashmiri said that he didn't see anyone parallel to Gangohi in Fiqh during the century's span among the group of well-qualified Ulama (Islamic scholars). Gangohi objected to the internal shortcomings of Muslims, curbing on the polytheistic customs and beliefs that crept into Muslims and struggled for the restoration of the glory of the past Muslims through his Fatwas.

== See also ==
- Deobandi fiqh
- Fatawa Darul Uloom Deoband
- Al-Muhannad 'ala al-Mufannad
