= Fatwa of Peace for Humanity =

2016 fatwa by Farid Uddin Masood

- Bengali cover
- Author: Farid Uddin Masood
- Original title: একলক্ষ মুফতি, উলামা ও আইম্মার দস্তখতসম্বলিত সন্ত্রাস ও জঙ্গিবাদবিরোধী মানবকল্যাণে শান্তির ফতওয়া
- Working title: Fatwa of Peace for Humanity against terrorism and extremism signed by one hundred thousand Muftis, Ulamas and Imams
- Translator: Aspire to Innovate
- Language: Bengali
- Subject: Islamic terrorism
- Genre: Fatwa
- Publisher: Bangladesh Jamiyatul Ulama
- Publication date: 18 June 2016
- Publication place: Bangladesh
- Media type: Print
- Pages: 32

Fatwa of Peace for Humanity against terrorism and extremism signed by one hundred thousand Muftis, Ulamas and Imams (Bengali: একলক্ষ মুফতি, উলামা ও আইম্মার দস্তখতসম্বলিত সন্ত্রাস ও জঙ্গিবাদবিরোধী মানবকল্যাণে শান্তির ফতওয়া) was issued by Bangladesh Jamiyatul Ulama under the leadership of Farid Uddin Masood. The fatwa unanimously declares that violence and suicide attacks in the name of Islam are prohibited. It was released on 18 June 2016, in response to the growing extremism and terrorism in Bangladesh and worldwide. The original fatwa is 32 pages long and provides answers to ten questions related to terrorism and extremism. The signatures of the endorsing scholars, including a significant number of female scholars, are recorded in 30 volumes. This fatwa has gained significant importance in the national media of Bangladesh and has been highlighted by many international media outlets. It has been sent to various national and international organizations in Bangladesh, including the Prime Minister, President, United Nations, and OIC.

The fatwa is branded for counterterrorism in Bangladesh. The fatwa declares terrorism and militancy in the name of Islam as haram, and it also declares participating in the funerals of terrorists as haram. It prohibits the killing of Muslims, minorities, and non-religious people. The possibility of going to heaven for those who help terrorists is denied. In response to the fatwa, a terrorist attack was carried out on Farid Uddin Masood at the Sholakia Eidgah, targeting him. Two police officers and three others were killed, and 16 were injured. In this incident, 19 people were killed in crossfire by the police among the 24 suspects.

== Background ==
On 17 August 2005, Bangladesh witnessed the largest act of terrorism in its history through a bomb attack orchestrated by JMB in all 61 districts of the country. Subsequently, terrorism became one of the most pressing issues in Bangladesh. From 2015 to mid-2016, terrorists carried out 46 attacks in Bangladesh, resulting in the deaths of 48 people, including writers, professors, publishers, Hindu priests, Buddhist monks, Christian preachers, online activists, and foreigners. The majority of these incidents were claimed by ISIS.

In December 2015, a seminar titled "Terrorism in the Eyes of Islam: Bangladesh Perspective" was held under the chairmanship of IGP A. K. M. Shahidul Haque to address the issue of terrorism. During the seminar, the police emphasized the necessity of assistance from the imams and ulama of the country's mosques to combat terrorism. Farid Uddin Masood presented a proposal to collect signatures of one lakh imams against terrorism, which was supported by the IGP. The IGP agreed to this proposal and urged the initiative to be implemented.
