= Rashid Ahmad Gangohi =

Indian Islamic scholar (1826–1905)

Maulana Muhaddith Rashid Ahmad Gangohi
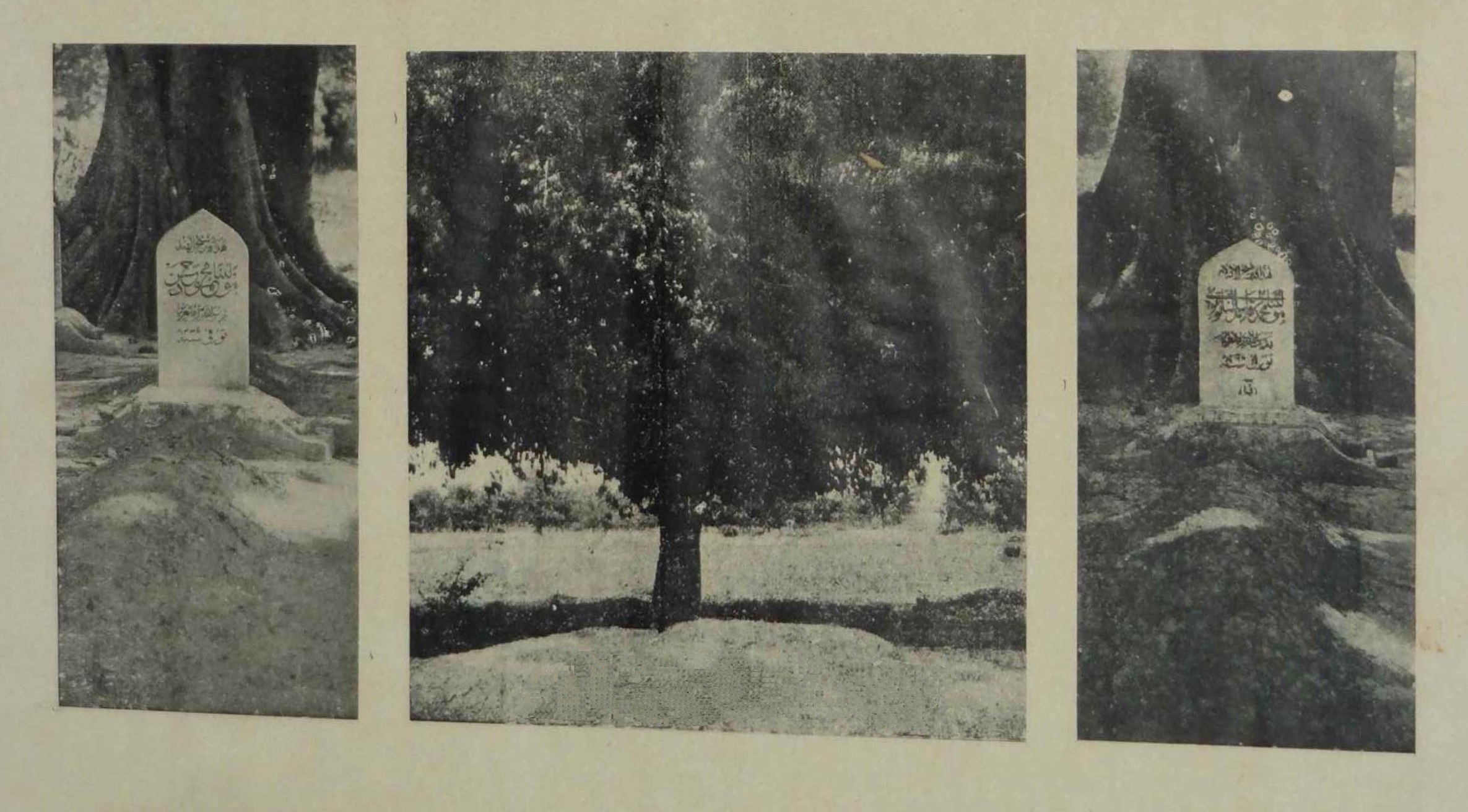
- Grave of Rashid Ahmad Gangohi in 1928

Personal life
- Born: Rashid Ahmad; 12 June 1826 Gangoh, Ceded and Conquered Provinces, British India (present-day Uttar Pradesh, India)
- Died: 11 August 1905 (aged 79) Gangoh, United Provinces, British India (present-day Uttar Pradesh, India)
- Main interest(s): Aqidah, Tafsir, Hadith, Fiqh
- Notable idea: Darul Uloom Deoband

Religious life
- Religion: Islam
- Denomination: Sunni
- Jurisprudence: Hanafi
- Creed: Maturidi
- Movement: Deobandi

Muslim leader
- Disciple of: Haji Imdadullah
- Disciples: Zamiruddin Ahmad, Saeed Ahmad Sandwipi, Ibrahim Ujani Maulana Syed Shah Waris Hasan, Shah Peer Muhammad Sahab
- Influenced by: Shah Ismail Dehlvi Shah Waliullah Dehlawi Mamluk Ali Nanautawi Haji Imdadullah Abdul Ghani Dihlawi
- Influenced: Khalil Ahmad Saharanpuri Ashraf Ali Thanwi Muhammad Ilyas Kandhlawi Majid Ali Jaunpuri Hussain Ahmad Madani

Military service
- Years&nsbp;of&nsbp;service: 1857
- Battles/wars: Indian War of Independence: Battle of Shamli

Rashīd Aḥmad ibn Hidāyat Aḥmad Ayyūbī Anṣārī Gangohī (Note: (Urdu: رشید احمد گنگوہی)) (12 June 1826 – 11 August 1905) was an Indian Deobandi Islamic scholar, a leading figure of the Deobandi movement, jurist and scholar of hadith, author of Fatawa-e-Rashidiya. His lineage reaches back to Abu Ayyub al-Ansari.

Along with Muhammad Qasim Nanautawi he was a pupil of Mamluk Ali Nanautawi. Both studied the books of hadith under Shah Abdul Ghani Mujaddidi and later became Sufi disciples of Haji Imdadullah. His lectures on Sahih al-Bukhari and Jami` at-Tirmidhi were recorded by his student Muhammad Yahya Kandhlawi, later edited, arranged, and commented on by Zakariyya Kandhlawi, and published as Lami al-Darari ala Jami al-Bukhari and Al-Kawakib al-Durri sharh Jami al-Tirmidhi.

== Name ==
In Tazkiratur Rashid his name and nasab is given as follows: Rashīd Aḥmad ibn Hidāyat Aḥmad (Note: Arabic: هدايت أحمد, Hidāyat Aḥmad, or هداية أحمد, Hidāyah Aḥmad) ibn Qāẓī Pīr Bak͟hsh ibn Qāẓī G͟hulām Ḥasan ibn Qāẓī G͟hulām ‘Alī ibn Qāẓī ‘Alī Akbar ibn Qāẓī Muḥammad Aslam al-Anṣārī al-Ayyūbī. In the biographical work Nuzhat al-Khawatir he is mentioned with the nisbats "al-Anṣārī, al-Ḥanafī, ar-Rāmpūrī then al-Gangohī". In the introduction to al-Kawkab ad-Durri he is mentioned as "Mawlānā Abī Mas‘ūd Rashīd Aḥmad al-Anṣārī al-Ayyūbī al-Kankawhī al-Ḥanafī al-Jishtī an-Naqshbandī al-Qādirī as-Suhrawardī".

His given name was Rashid Ahmad; Abu Masud was his kunya. His heritage can be traced back to the Islamic prophet Muhammad's companion Abu Ayyub al-Ansari.

== Biography ==
Rashid Ahmad was born on Monday, 6 Dhu al-Qi'dah 1244 AH (12 June 1826) in Gangoh, Saharanpur District, British India (in present-day Uttar Pradesh, India). He was born in the mahallah of Sarai, close to the tomb of Abdul Quddus Gangohi. Both his father Maulana Hidayat Ahmad and his mother Karimun Nisa belonged to Ansari Ayyubi families, claiming descent from Abu Ayyub al-Ansari. His ancestral village was Rampur, but his grandfather Qazi Pir Bakhsh had settled in Gangoh.

His father, Hidayat Ahmad, was an Islamic scholar connected to the Waliullahi tradition, and in tasawwuf (Sufism) an authorized khalifah (successor) of Shah Ghulam Ali Mujaddidi Dihlawi. He died in 1252 AH (1836) at the age of 35, when Rashid was seven. A few years later Rashid's younger brother Sa'id Ahmad also died, at the age of nine.

After the death of his father, the responsibility for Rashid's upbringing fell to his grandfather Qazi Pir Bakhsh. He also had four maternal uncles: Muhammad Naqi, Muhammad Taqi, Abdul Ghani, and Muhammad Shafi. He was especially close to Abdul Ghani, who took on a fatherly role for him. He also had a close friendship with his younger cousin, Abun Nasr, son of Abdul Ghani.

Rashid Ahmad received his elementary education from a local teacher, Miyanji Qutb Bakhsh Gangohi. He read the Qur'an in Gangoh, probably at home with his mother. Then he studied the primary Persian books with his older brother Inayat Ahmad. He completed Persian studies in Karnal with his maternal uncle Muhammad Taqi and also partly with Muhammad Ghaus. Afterwards he studied the primary books of Arabic grammar (sarf and nahw) with Muhammad Bakhsh Rampuri, on whose encouragement he then traveled to Delhi in pursuit of knowledge in 1261 AH (1845), at the age of 17.

After arriving in Delhi he studied Arabic with Qazi Ahmaduddin Punjabi Jehlami. Afterwards he attended the classes of different teachers before becoming a pupil of Mamluk Ali Nanautawi, a scholar of the Shah Waliullah line, and a professor at Delhi College. It was in this period that Rashid Ahmad met and developed a close companionship with Mamluk Ali's nephew, Muhammad Qasim Nanautawi. Both were private pupils of Mamluk Ali. After he completed his studies with Mamluk Ali, he stayed a few more years in Delhi to study under other teachers. He became a pupil of Mufti Sadruddin Azurdah, with whom he studied some books of the ulum-i aqliyah (rational sciences). He studied the books of hadith and tafsir under Shah Abdul Ghani Mujaddidi. Shah Ahmad Sa'id, the older brother of Shah Abdul Ghani Mujaddidi, was also among his teachers.

After four years in Delhi, Rashid returned home to Gangoh. He married Khadijah, daughter of his uncle Muhammad Naqi, at the age of 21. It was not until after his marriage that he memorized the Qur'an. He then travelled to Thana Bhawan, where he gave bay'ah (allegiance) at the hand of Haji Imdadullah in the Sufi path. He remained in Imdadullah's company and service for 42 days. When he prepared to leave for Gangoh, Imdadullah held his hand and gave him permission to take disciples.

While Nanautawi and Gangohi are often mentioned as co-founders of Darul Uloom Deoband, Rizvi writes that there is no historical evidence that Gangohi played a role in its establishment in 1283 AH. However, due to his close relationship with Nanautawi and others involved, it is unlikely that he was unaware of its founding. Rizvi cites a record of Gangohi's written inspection of the madrasah on 3 Rajab 1285 AH as the earliest evidence for his formal relationship with the madrasah. It was also common for graduates of the madrasah to attend Rashid Ahmad's hadith lectures in Gangoh.

Alongside Muhammad Qasim Nanautvi, Gangohi's efforts were instrumental in fostering a transnational, pan-Islamic consciousness in the subcontinent amongst the educated middle classes; during an era of increasing connectivity and arrival of new technologies of communication. He forbade Muslims from engaging in various customs which he regarded as stemming from Hindu culture and criticised those Muslims "who retained trappings of ‘Hindu’ culture and lifestyles"; whether in clothing or lifestyle. As a strong opponent of the British rule; Gangohi also fiercely denounced the singing of patriotic British songs in English schools; denouncing it as an act of Kufr (disbelief).

In 1297 AH, after the death of Qasim, Rashid was made sarparast (patron) of Darul Uloom Deoband. From 1314 AH he was also sarparast of the Darul Uloom's sister madrasah, Mazahir Uloom Saharanpur.

In 1314 AH he lost his eye-sight and became blind. In 1323 AH during the Tahujjad prayers (predawn prayers), he was bitten by a highly venomous snake. This led to him later dying on (the same day) Friday, 8 Jumada II 1323 AH (1905 AD) after the Adhan (call for prayer) for the Friday prayer.

== Death ==
Rashid Ahmad Gangohi rejected the claims of Mirza Ghulam Ahmad and proclaimed him to be a deceiver. Ahmadis maintain Rashid Ahmad Gangohi as having died in consequence of a Mubahila (prayer duel) with their founder, Mirza Ghulam Ahmad after Gangohi's fatwa of kufr regarding Mirza Ghulam Ahmad. The opposing view is that this was a natural occurrence without any connection to any prayer duel.

== View of Taqwiyyat-ul-Iman ==
Gangohi is said to have been one of the few people to receive the original Arabic version of Taqwiyyat-ul-Iman, prior to its translation into Urdu by Shah Ismail Dehlvi himself. Gangohi said regarding Shah Ismail:

Ismaīl was a pious scholar and a remover of innovation (bidah) and propagator of the Sunnah […] he was a saint and martyr […] His book Taqwiyyat-ul-Īmān is a great work, refuting shirk and bidah and it is the interpretation of the Book of God and the Ahādīth and to keep it and practise upon it is in accordance with the religion of Islam and a means to gain reward and the one who calls it malicious is a sinner (fāsiq) and innovator (bidatī). If a person due to his ignorance cannot comprehend its speciality, it is then his own fault and no fault of the author. Great scholars of righteousness have likened this book and have said that if any deviant calls it malicious, then he himself is astray and misguided.

— Gangohi

== Legacy ==
His biographical works include: Yaad Yaraan by Ashraf Ali Thanwi and Habibur Rahman Usmani, Wasl al-Habeeb ma'a Wasī'at Nāmah wa Qaṣīdat Mudḥiḥa by Aashiq-e-Ilahi Mirathi, Tazkiratur Rashid by Aashiq-e-Ilahi Mirathi.

== Eponyms ==
- Masjid-e-Rasheed
- Fatawa-e-Rashidiya
- Charmonai Ahsanabad Rashidia Kamil Madrasa
- Charmonai Jamia Rashidia Islamia

== See also ==
- Muhammad Mian Mansoor Ansari
- Majid Ali Jaunpuri
- Hussain Ahmad Madani
- Al-Muhannad 'ala al-Mufannad
- Masjid-e-Rasheed
