= Namazi =

Namazi (Persian: نمازی) is an Iranian surname. Notable people with the surname include:

- Hossein Namazi, Iranian economist and politician
- Mohammad Namazi, Iranian businessman
- Omid Namazi, Iranian-American soccer defender
- Siamak Namazi, Iranian-American businessman imprisoned in Iran since 2015

== See also ==
- Namazi Hospital
- Namazi Square
- Namazi Metro Station
