= Mahmood Hasan Gangohi =

Indian Mufti and Islamic scholar (1907–1996)

Faqīh-ul-Ummat, Mufti Mahmood Hasan Gangohi

Personal life
- Born: July 1907 Gangoh, British Raj
- Died: 2 September 1996 (aged 89) South Africa
- Resting place: Elsburg, South Africa
- Education: Darul Uloom Deoband

Religious life
- Religion: Islam
- Denomination: Sunni
- Jurisprudence: Hanafi
- Movement: Deobandi

Muslim leader
- Disciple of: Hussain Ahmad Madani, Muhammad Zakariya Kandhalvi
- Influenced: Ebrahim Desai, Rahmatullah Mir Qasmi, Salman Mansoorpuri, Mufti Muhammad Ayoub, Ahmed Khanpuri

Mahmood Hasan Gangohi (July 1907 – 2 September 1996) was an Indian mufti, Islamic scholar and former Head Mufti of Darul Uloom Deoband and Mazahir Uloom, Saharanpur. He was the most senior disciple of Zakariyya Kandhlawi.

Among his notable disciples are Abul Qasim Nomani, Rahmatullah Mir Qasmi, Ebrahim Desai, Ahmed Khanpuri and Muhammad Yusuf Taulawi.

== Early life and career ==
He was born in Gangoh (India) in July 1907 and studied in Mazahir Uloom, Saharanpur and Darul Uloom Deoband. Later he taught in Saharanpur and in Deoband along with the service of issuing Fatwas (Islamic Verdicts). His Fatwa collection entitled 'Fataawa Mahmoodiyah' comprises 32 volumes and is copious reference book on Hanafi Fiqh Verdicts.

Gangohi was an authorized disciple of Zakariyya Kandhlawi.

Gangohi remained Principal of Jami ul Uloom in Kanpur for about 14 years, and served as Head Mufti of Darul Uloom Deoband during the last phase of his life.

== Literary works ==
- The Urdu translation Seerat-e-Sayyidu-l-Bashar of Al-Tabari
- Faharisi-l-Haawee li-Haashiyatu-t-Tahtawee
- Manaazilu-l-'Ilm (The Stages of Acquiring Knowledge)
- Malfoozaat-e-Faqeehu-l-Ummah (2 volumes) (The Statements & Anecdotes of the Jurist of the Ummah)
- Khutabaat/Mawaa'iz-e-Faqeehu-l-Ummah (5 volumes) (The Discourses of the Jurist of the Ummah) (only 2 out of the 5 volumes has been translated as of 2018)
- Fataawaa-e-Mahmoodiyah (32 volumes)
- Boundaries of Differences

== Disciples ==
His disciples included Abul Qasim Nomani, Mufti Sabeel Ahmed, Ebrahim Desai, Rahmatullah Mir Qasmi, Ahmed Khanpuri, Muhammad Yusuf Taulawi, and Mufti Muhammad Ayoub.

== Death ==
He died in South Africa where he was touring on 2 September 1996, at the invitation of Maulana Ibrahim Pandor and was buried in Elsburg about 4 km away from Hazeldene.

Religious titles
Preceded by Mahdi Hasan Shahjahanpuri	11th Head Mufti of Darul Uloom Deoband; 23 September 1965 - 1970	Succeeded by Nizamuddin Azmi
