= Abdul Quddus Gangohi =

Indian Sufi scholar

Abdul Quddus

Personal life
- Born: 1456 Rudauli, Faizabad
- Died: 1537 (aged 80–81)

Religious life
- Religion: Islam

Abdul Quddus Gangohi (1456–1537) was an Indian Sufi scholar.

== Life ==
He was a Sufi poet and Chisti shaykh. He belonged to the Sabiri branch of the Chishti silsila.

Thirty years later, he moved to Gangoh in Saharanpur district, attracted by the reputation of Ahmad Abdul Haqq.

== Works ==
Maktubat (letters of Abdul Quddoos Gangohi Maktubat Quddoosiya) (مکتوبات قدوسیہ اردو ترجمہ)
