= Gangoh =

- Town
- Location in Uttar Pradesh, India
- Coordinates: 29°46′50″N 77°15′45″E
- Country: India
- State: Uttar Pradesh
- District: Saharanpur

Government
  - Body: Municipality
  - Municipal Chair: Noman Masood (Congress)
- Elevation: 292 m (958 ft)

Population (2011)
  - Total: 59,279

Language
  - Official: Hindi
  - Additional official: Urdu
- Time zone: UTC+5:30 (IST)
- PIN: 247 341
- Vehicle registration: UP-11

Gangoh is a town and a municipal board in Saharanpur district in the state of Uttar Pradesh, India. It lies about 40 km south-west of Saharanpur city. Other nearby towns are Karnal, Haryana, which is about 35 km south-west of Gangoh; Yamunanagar, Haryana, about 50 km to the north-west; and Shamli, Uttar Pradesh, about 50 km to the south. The town lies about 150 km north-east of the national capital, Delhi.

Gangoh Block consists of about 173 villages and comes under the Nakur tehsil of Saharanpur district. The people of these villages mainly speak Khari boli, which is spoken in rural areas of the Upper Doab region of the Saharanpur, Shamli, Muzaffarnagar, Baghpat and Meerut districts. The soil of the block and its villages is fertile, and crops like wheat, rice, sugarcane, and mangoes are grown on a large scale every year.

Proposed Shamli Ambala six lane expressway will pass through Gangoh and it will enhance connectivity among West UP, Haryana and Punjab.

== Name ==
According to Paul Whalley, the name Gaṅgoh is derived from Gaṅgu, a common vernacular variation of the name Gaṅgā (this variant is also found in other place names like Gaṅgupur or Gaṅgwā). The ending in -h, according to him, represents the genitive suffix from Old Hindi, which came from the -s ending in Prakrit.

== History ==
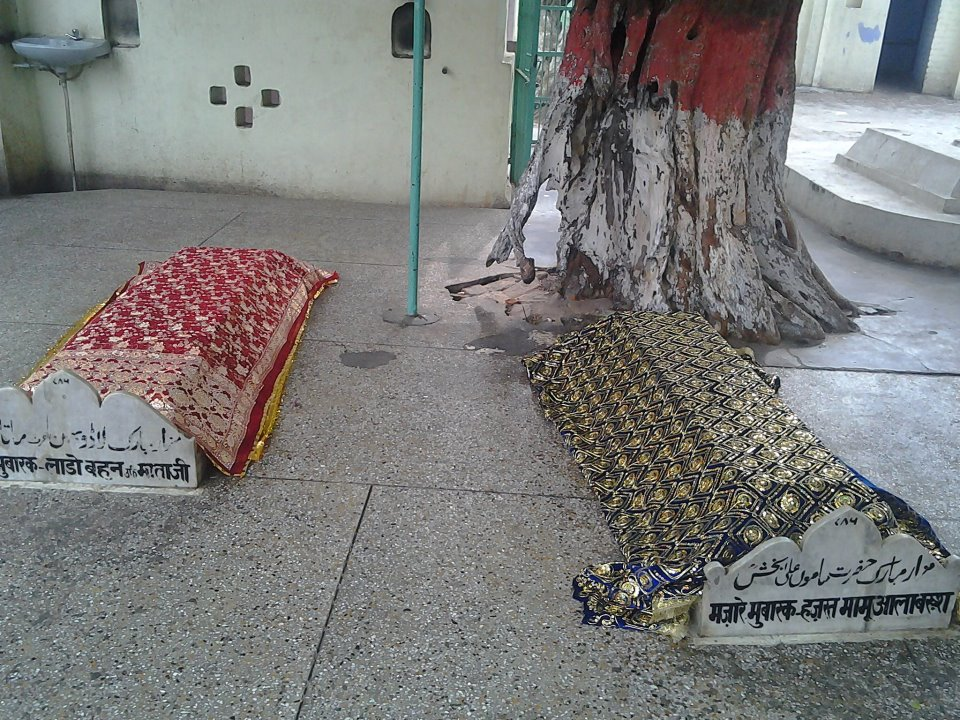
The Dargah Sharif of the great Sufi saints Mamu Allah Bakhsh and Mata Lado Rani

According to the 1911 British publication The Imperial Gazetteer of India:

The town [Gangoh] consists of an old and new quarter, the former founded by a legendary hero. Raja Gang, from whom its name is derived, and the latter by the famous saint Shaikh Abdul Kuddus, who gives his title to the western suburb, where his mausoleum stands, built by Humayun in 1537 and Molana Rasheed Ahmad Gangohi which was co-founder of madrasa darul-aloom Deuband and participated in war against East India Company under the flag of Haji Imdadullah Muhajir Makki. During the Mutiny Gangoh was frequently threatened by the rebel Gurjars (Gujjars) under the self-styled Raja Fathua; but Mr. H. D. Robertson and Lieutenant Boisragon attacked and utterly defeated them towards the end of June, 1857. There are three old mosques, two of which were built by Akbar and Jahangir, besides a school and a dispensary. The town is liable to be flooded from a large swamp south of the site, but a scheme has been prepared to drain this. The streets are paved and most of them have brickwork drains. Gangoh is administered under Act XX of 1856, the income raised being about Rs. 3,000 a year. It is the cleanest and best kept of all the towns under Act XX in the District.

— Henry Frowde

Gangoh is listed in the Ain-i-Akbari as a pargana under Saharanpur sarkar, producing a revenue of 2,029,032 dams for the imperial treasury and supplying a force of 2000 infantry and 300 cavalry. A community of Turkomans is mentioned as living in the town at the time.

== Demographics ==
As of 2011 India census, Gangoh had a population of 59,279. Males constitute 52.83% of the population and females 47.16%. Gangoh has an average literacy rate of 63.51%, lower than the national average of 74.04%.

== Notable people ==
- Abdul Quddus Gangohi
- Rashid Ahmad Gangohi
- Mahmud Hasan Gangohi
- Pradeep Kumar, Indian politician and Member of Parliament
- Kirat Singh (politician), member of the 18th Legislative Assembly of Uttar Pradesh
- Muhammad Hanif Gangohi

== See also ==
- Gangohi
