= List of Deobandi madrasas =

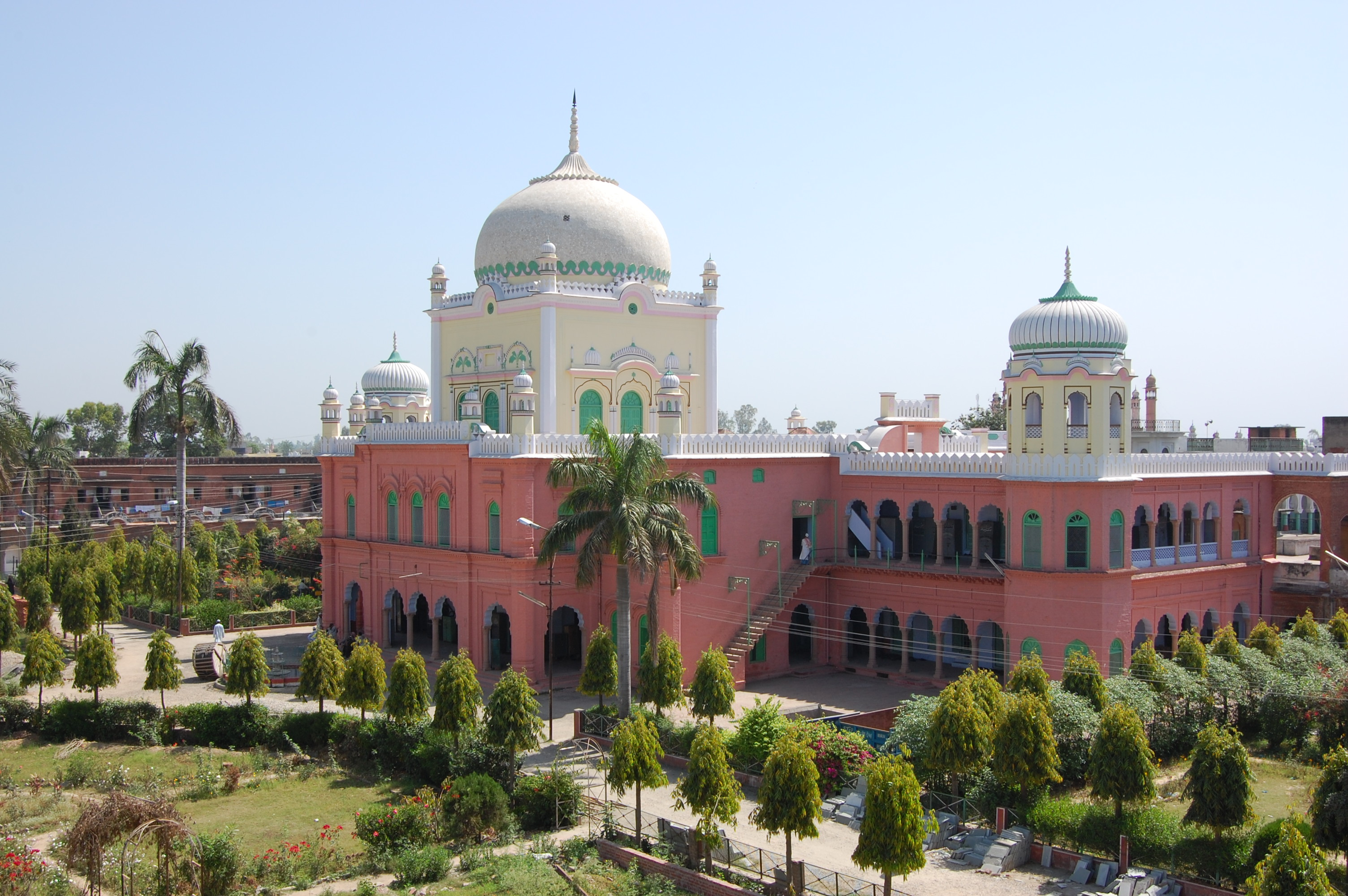
Darul Uloom Deoband, India

Deobandi is a term used for a revivalist movement in Islam. It is centered primarily in India, Pakistan, Afghanistan and Bangladesh and has recently spread to the United Kingdom and has a presence in South Africa. The name derives from Deoband, India, where the school, Darul Uloom Deoband, is situated. The movement was inspired by the spirit of scholar Shah Waliullah (1703–1762), while the foundation of Darul Uloom Deoband was laid on 30 May 1866. Darul Ulum was the epicenter of the protest against the occupation of British East India company and the British Raj. There are many Deobandi universities around the world. The names of the countries are arranged in alphabetical order.

== Bangladesh ==
University (Jamia) Name	Nick Name	Founded	Location	Website
Jamia Madania Angura Muhammadpur	Jamia Angura	1958	Angura Muhammadpur, Beanibazar, Sylhet.	
Al-Jamسiatul Arabia Kachemul Uloom Kazirhat Hifz Madrasah and Orphanage	Kazirhat Madrasah	1951	Mirsarai, Chittagong, Bangladesh	
Al-Jamiatul Ahlia Darul Ulum Moinul Islam	Hathazari Madrasah	1896	Chittagong, Bangladesh	
Al-Jamiah Al-Islamiah Patiya	Patiya Madrasah	1938	Patiya, Chittagong	
Al-Jamiatul Islamia Al-Azizia Anwarul Ulum	Hili Madrasah	1960	Bangla-Hili, Hakimpur, Dinajpur	
Al-Jameatul Arabiatul Islamia Ziri	Ziri Madrasah	1910	Ziri, Patiya, Chittagong	
Jamia Tawakkulia Renga Madrasah	Renga Madrasah	1919	Sylhet, Bangladesh	
Jamiah Islamiah Yunusia Brahmanbaria	Yunusia Madrasah	1914	Brahmanbaria, Bangladesh	
Jamiah Rahmania Arabia Dhaka	Muhammadpur Madrasah	1986	Muhammadpur, Dhaka	
Jamia Qurania Arabia Lalbagh	Lalbagh Madrasah	1950	Lalbagh, Dhaka	
Jamia Luthfia Anwarul Uloom Hamid Nogor	Boruna Madrasah	1941	Srimangal, Moulvibazar	
Al-Jameatul-Islamia Qasemul Uloom Charia	Charia Madrasah	1944	Charia, Hathazari, Chittagong	
Al-Jamiatul Islamiah Azizul Uloom Babunagar	Babunagar Madrasah	1924	Babunagar, Fatikchhari, Chittagong	
Al-Jamiah Al-Islamiah Obaidia Nanupur	Nanupur Obaidia Madrasah	1957	Nanupur, Fatikchhari, Chittagong	
Al-Jamiatus Shari'ah Malibag, Dhaka	Jamia Shariah Malibag	1956	1037, Malibagh, Dhaka – 1217	
Jamiatul Uloom Al-Islamia Lalkhan Bazar	Lalkhan Bazar Madrasah	1981	Lalkhan Bazar, Chittagong	
Jamia Darul Ma'arif Al-Islamia	Darul Maarif	1985	Bahaddarhat, Chittagong	
Al Jamiatul Arabia Nasirul Islam

== Canada ==
University	Nick	Founded	Location	Website
Darul-Uloom Canada		2010	Chatham Township, Ontario	
Al-Rashid Islamic Institute	Jamia Al-Rashid	1980	Cornwall, Ontario	
Aishah Siddiqah Islamic Institute	Jamia Aishah Siddiqah		Bowmanville, Canada	

== India ==
University	Nick	Founded	Location	Website
Darul Uloom Deoband	Darul Uloom & Deoband Madrasa	1866	Deoband, UP	
Mazahirul Uloom Saharanpur	Mazahirul Uloom & Saharanpur Madrasa	1866	Saharanpur, UP	
Darul Uloom Nadwatul Ulama	House of knowledge	1893	Lucknow, Uttar Pradesh	https://www.nadwa.in/en/
Jamia Miftahul Uloom	madarsa Shahi Katra	1877	Mau District, Uttar Pradesh	
Darul Uloom Mau	Darul Uloom Mau	1875	Mau District, Uttar Pradesh	
Madinatul Uloom Bagbari	Darul Uloom Bagbari	1873	Karimganj district, Assam	
Jamia Qasmia Madrasa Shahi, Moradabad	Madrasa Shahi	1879	Moradabad, Uttar Pradesh	www.madrasashahi.com
Madrasa Aminia		1897	Kashmiri Gate, Delhi	
Darul Uloom Banskandi	Banskandi Madrasa	1897	Banskandi, Cachar district, Assam	
Darul-uloom Nadwatul Ulama	Nadwatul Ulama	1898	Lucknow, India	
Jamiah Islamiah Talimuddin Dabhel	Jamiah Dabhel	1928	Dabhel, Gujarat, India	
Jamia Islamia Arabia	Tarjume Wali Masjid	1954	Ibrahimpura, Bhopal	http://jamiaislamiabhopal.com
Jami'ah al Baqiyath as Salihat	Bakhiyath Salihath Arabic College	1857	Vellore, Tamil Nadu	
Darul Uloom Raheemiyyah	Raheemiya Seat of Learning	1979	Bandipore, Kashmir	www.raheemiyyah.com
Darul Uloom Waqf	Darul Uloom Waqf	1982	Deoband, Saharanpur	www.dud.edu.in
Jamiatul Qasim Darul Uloom Al-Islamiah	Jamiatul Qasim	1989	Indo-Nepal border, Bihar	
Jamia Imam Muhammad Anwar Shah	Jamia Imam	1997	Deoband, Saharanpur	
Jamia Imam waliullah al islamia phulat	Jamia Shah Waliullah	1983	Phulat, Muzaffarnagar	
Madrasa Mifthahul Uloom	Miftah & Miftahul Uloom	19??	Melvisharam, Vellore Dist., Tamil Nadu	
Darul Uloom Sabeel Ur Rashad	Arabic College	1971	Arabic College Post, Bengaluru, Karnataka	www.sabeelurrashad.com/
Darul Uloom Sha Waliulla	Sha Waliulla	19__	Tannery Rd, Bengaluru, Karnataka	
Al Jamia Al Islamia Maseeh Ul Uloom	Maseeh Ul Uloom	2001	Mitganahalli, Bengaluru, Karnataka	
Darul Uloom Mubarakah	Mubarakah	2000	Peenya, Bengaluru, Karnataka	www.darululoommubarakah.com/
Darul Uloom Sabeelus Salam	Sabeelus Salam	1972	Salala, Hyderabad, Telangana	www.sabeelussalam.org
Jamia Islamia Markazul Uloom		1946	Tabligh Nagar, Post Office: Kood, Salepur block, Cuttack district, Odisha, India 754221	

== Pakistan ==
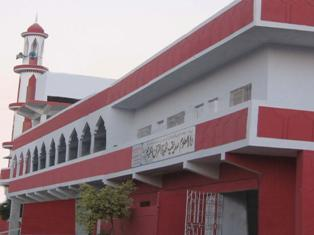
Jamia Darul-uloom Siddiqia, Karachi, Sindh, Pakistan

University	Nick	Founded	Location	Website
Darul 'Uloom Karachi	Jamiah Karachi	1951	Korangi, Karachi	
Jamia Khairul Madaris	Khair-ul-Madaris	1947	Multan	
Jamia Farooqia	Jamiah Farooqia	1967	Karachi, Pakistan	farooqia.com
Jamia Faridia	Al Faridia University	1971	Islamabad, Pakistan	JamiaFaridia.edu.pk
Jamia Binoria International		1979	Karachi, Sindh	
Jamia Uloom-ul-Islamia	Banuri Town	1954	Karachi, Pakistan	
Jamia tur Rasheed, Karachi	Jamia tur Rasheed	1977	Ahsanabad, Pakistan	
Ashrafia Islamic University	Jamia Ashrafia	1947	Lahore, Punjab	
Jamia Darul-uloom Siddiqia	Jamia Siddiqia	1990	Karachi, Sindh, Pakistan	
Jamiah Arabia Ahsan-Ul-Uloom	Ahsan-Ul-Uloom	1977	Karachi, Pakistan	
Jamia Darul Uloom Haqqania	Jamia Haqqania	1948	Akora Khattak, Khyber Pakhtunkhwa	
Jamia Madnia Jadeed	Jamia Madnia Jadeed	1980	Raiwind, Punjab	
Markaz Ahle Sunnat Wal Jamaat	Markaz Ahle Sunnat Wal Jamaat		Sargodha, Punjab	
Darul Uloom Gujranwala	Darul Uloom Gujranwala	1995	Gujranwala, Punjab	

== South Africa ==
Name	Nick	Founded	Location	Website
Darul Uloom Zakariyya	Madrasah Zakariyya	1983	Lenasia, South Africa	
Madrasah In'aamiyyah		1994	Camperdown, South Africa	
Madrassah Arabia Islamia	Darul Uloom Azaadville	1982	Azaadville, South Africa	
Madrassah Al-Ulum-U-Shariah	Darul ulum Benoni, Mufti Bhana's madrassah		Benoni, South Africa	
Madrassah Ashraful Ulum	Little Jalalabad, De deur madrassah		De deur, South Africa	
Madrassah Taleemuddeen	Ispingo madrassah		Ispingo Beach, South Africa	

== Southeast Asia (Malaysia, Indonesia, Cambodia) ==
The List below is credited to the work of Dr. Dietrich Reetz namely "Travelling Islam – Madrasa Graduates from India and Pakistan in the Malay Archipelago".

Name	Nick	Founded	Location	Particulars	Website
Miftahul Ulum Sri Petaling	MUSP	1995	Sri Petaling, Kuala Lumpur. Malaysia	Founded ~ 1995	
Madrasah Miftah al-Ulum			Lot 3249, Batu 35, Jalan Kuntum, Kampung Boundary, Bukit Changgang, 42700 Banting, Selangor Darul Ehsan. Malaysia	Branch of Sri Petaling Madrasah	
Madrasah al-Iman			Madrasah al-Iman, St. 369, PRek Pre PRek Tapov, Mean Chey, Phnom Penh. Cambodia	Branch of Sri Petaling Madrasah	
Madrasah al-Qur'an Sinaran Baru	MQSB	1998	Lorong Langsat, Kampung Sinaran Baru, 81300 Skudai, Johor Darul Takzim. Malaysia	Twinning Programme of Sri Petaling school	
Madrasah Tahfiz Miftahul Ulum	MTMU	2001	Lot 5649, Jalan Kuari Sungai Long, Kg. Sungai Serai, 43100 Hulu Langat, Selangor Darul Ehsan. Malaysia	Reference from Sri Petaling school	
Madrasatul Quran Kubang Bujuk	MQKB	1982	Kubang Bujuk, Serada 20050 Kuala Terengganu. Terengganu. Malaysia	Deoband reference in curriculum at http://www.freewebs.com/madrasatulquran/	
Darul Kauthar			Lot 1496/7, Taman Sri Demit, 16150, Kubang Kerian, Kota Bharu, Kelantan. Malaysia	Deoband references at www.darulkautsar.net	
Maahad Tarbiyyah Al-Islamiah, Derang	MTID		K355, Kampung Derang, 06400 Pokok Sena, Kedah, Malaysia	Affiliated with Nadwatul 'Ulum, http://mtiderang. blogspot.com/	
Pondok Pesantren Al Fatah			Desa Temboro Kecamatan Karas Kab Magetan 63395 Jatim. Indonesia	Affiliated with Tablighi Jamaat, Deobandi teaching, http://alfatah-pondokpesantren.blogspot.com/	

== United Kingdom ==
University	Nick	Founded	Location	Website
Darul Uloom Al-Arabiyyah Al-Islamiyyah	Darul Uloom Bury	1973	Holcombe, Bury	
Darul Uloom London		1988	Chislehurst, Kent	
Madinatul Uloom Al Islamiya	MTU	1992	Kidderminster, Worcestershire	
Darul Uloom Bolton		1993	Bolton, Lancashire	
Jamiatul Ilm Wal Huda	Darul Uloom Blackburn	1997	Blackburn, Lancashire	
Jammai taleem Islam	Durul uloom dewsbury		Dewsbury, Yorkshire	

== United States ==
University	Nick	Founded	Location	Website
D				
Darul Uloom Al-Madania		1986	Buffalo, New York	https://madania.ad-din.site/
Ma'had Ta'leemul Islām		1989	Elgin, Illinois, Chicago	https://islamicedu.org/
Darul Uloom Chicago			Chicago, Illinois	https://darululoomchicago.org/
Darul Qasim	DQ	2000	Glendale Heights, IL	https://darulqasim.org/
Darul Quran WasSunnah	DQWS	1738	New York City, New York	http://dqws.us/
Darul Quran WasSunnah Woodside	DQWS	2006	Flushing, NY 11377	
Darul Quran WasSunnah Walden	DQWS	2019	Walden, NY 12586	http://dqws.us/
Masjid DarusSalam		2013	Lombard, Illinois	https://masjidds.org/
Darul Uloom New Jersey	DUNJ	2010	Paterson, New Jersey	https://dunj.org/
Qalam Seminary	Qalam	2013	Carrollton, Texas	https://qalamcampus.org
Darul Uloom New York	DUNY	1997	Queens, New York	https://duny.us/

== West Indies ==
Darul Uloom Trinidad and Tobago (T&T)

== Saudi Arabia ==
University	Nick	Founded	Location	Website
Madrasah as-Sawlatiyah		1874	Makkah Mukarramah, Saudi Arabia	

== See also ==
- List of Deobandi organisations
