= Darul uloom (disambiguation) =

Darul uloom (Arabic: دار العلوم, transliterated dar al-`ulum; also spelled darul ulum, dar al-ulum etc.) is an Arabic term literally meaning "house of knowledge", the term generally means an Islamic seminary or educational institution.

It may specifically refer to:

- Darul Uloom Deoband, Islamic school in India where the Deobandi Islamic movement started, various Deobandi schools modelled after it include
  - Darul Uloom, Birmingham, Birmingham, England
  - Darul Uloom Bolton, Bolton, England
  - Darul Uloom Bury, first Islamic seminary (madrasa) in the UK, established by Yusuf Motala
  - Darul Uloom Haqqania, Akora Khattak, Khyber Pakhtunkhwa, Pakistan
  - Darul Uloom Hathazari, popularly known as the Hathazari Madrasa, educational institution in Hathazari, Chittagong, Bangladesh
  - Darul Uloom Karachi, Islamic education university (madrasa) in Karachi, Pakistan
  - Darul Uloom London, London, England
  - Darul Uloom Al-Madania, Buffalo, New York
  - Darul Uloom Nadwatul Ulama, Lucknow, India
  - Darul Uloom Zakariyya, Lenasia, South Africa
  - Jamiah Darul Uloom Zahedan, Zahedan, Iran
  - Jamia Uloom-ul-Islamia, Karachi, Pakistan
  - Madinatul Uloom Al Islamiya, Kidderminster UK, established by Yusuf Motala
- Monthly Darul Uloom, Indian monthly magazine in the Urdu-language published by the Darul Uloom Deoband
- Darul Uloom Pretoria, Barelvi institute in Pretoria, South Africa
- Markazi Darul Uloom or Jamia Salafia, Varanasi, Ahl-i Hadith seminary in Varanasi, India
- Faculty of Dar Al-Uloom, Cairo University, Cairo Egypt
- Dar Al Uloom University, university in Saudi Arabia
