= Jamiatul Ilm Wal Huda =

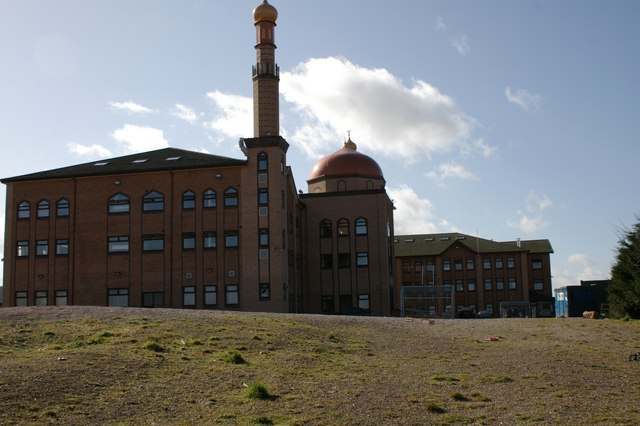
- Image of the school in March 2007.

Location
- 30 Moss Street; Blackburn, Lancashire, BB1 5JT; England; 53.7551°N 2.4635°W

Information
- Type: Private, boarding and day school
- Motto: Developing today's learners, inspiring tomorrow's leaders
- Religious affiliation: Islam
- Established: 1997
- Local authority: Blackburn with Darwen Borough Council
- Department for Education URN: 131389 Tables
- Ofsted: Reports
- Principal: Abdus-Samad Ahmed
- Gender: Boys
- Age range: 11–25
- Enrolment: 465 (2018)
- Capacity: 550
- Website: www.jamiah.co.uk

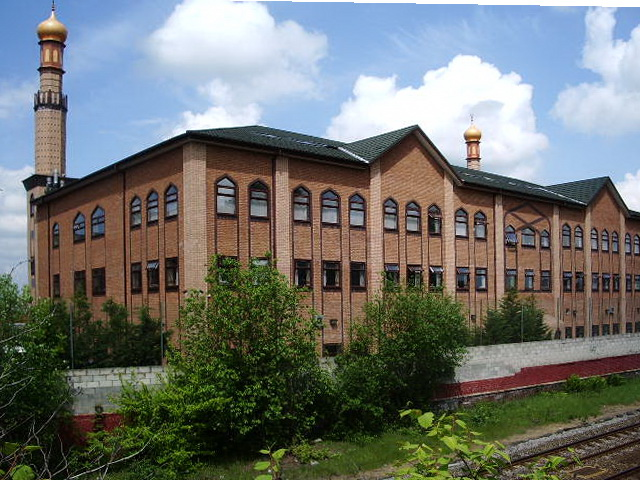
Image of the school in May 2007.

Jamiatul Ilm Wal Huda, also known as Darul Uloom Blackburn, is an 11–25 private, Islamic, boarding and day school for boys in Blackburn, Lancashire, England. It was established in 1997 and its name means The College of Knowledge and Guidance.

The majority of pupils that attend the school are local, but some come from around the UK, and a small minority are international students. The school therefore offers boarding facilities for about a third of its pupils.

== Purpose ==
The purpose of this institute is to allow individuals within the Islamic community to learn more about their religion, Islam. It also allows to teach the religion to others. Within some Islamic sects, it is also regarded as a compulsory act which can be fulfilled for the entire community if an individual within the community is sent to gain this knowledge. Henceforth, the obligatory act will be regarded as fulfilled for the entire community.

== See also ==
- Darul Uloom Bolton
- Darul Uloom Bury
- Darul Uloom Al-Madania
- Darul Uloom London
- Darul Uloom Zakariyya
- Madinatul Uloom Al Islamiya
- Mazahirul Uloom Saharanpur
