= Darul uloom =

Arabic term meaning "house of knowledge"

Darul uloom (/ˈdærʊl ʊˈluːm/; Arabic: دار العلوم, romanized: dār al-ʿulūm; lit. 'house of knowledge') is an Arabic term that generally refers to an Islamic seminary or educational institution – similar to or often the same as a madrassa or Islamic school – although a darul uloom often indicates a more advanced level of study. In a darul uloom, Islamic subjects are studied by students, who are known as talaba or ṭālib.

== Description ==
The conventional darul ulooms of today have their roots in the Indian subcontinent, where the first darul ulooms were founded by the Indian Islamic scholars (ulema) of the past. Darul ulooms followed in the past, and today continue to follow, the age-old Islamic curriculum known as the Dars-e-Nizami syllabus, which has its origins in the Farangi Mahal Islamic seminary of the Mughal Empire, developed by prominent Islamic thinker Nizamuddin Sihalivi thus the name Dars-e-Nizami, later on was merged with the dawra-e-hadith curriculum of Shah Waliullah Dehlawi (1703 – 1762). The Dars-e-Nizami syllabus comprises studies in tafsir (Qur'anic exegesis), hifz (Qur'anic memorisation), sarf and naḥw (Arabic syntax and grammar), Persian, Urdu, tarikh (Islamic history), fiqh (Islamic jurisprudence) and sharia (Islamic law).

== List of major darul ulooms ==
- Darul Uloom Deoband, Islamic university and seminary, Deoband, Uttar Pradesh, India (founded 1866)
- Dar-ul-Uloom, Karachi, Islamic education university (Madrasa) in Karachi, Pakistan (established 1951)
- Darul Uloom Haqqania, Akora Khattak, Khyber Pakhtunkhwa, Pakistan
- Jamia Uloom ul Islamia, Karachi, Pakistan'
- Jamiatul Uloom Al-Islamia Al-Faridia, Islamabad, Pakistan
- Dar Al Uloom University, university in Saudi Arabia
- Faculty of Dar Al Uloom Cairo University
- Al-Jamiatul Ahlia Darul Ulum Moinul Islam, Hathazari, Bangladesh
- Darul-uloom Nadwatul Ulama (established 1894), Lucknow, India
- Jamiah Darul Uloom Zahedan, Zahedan, Iran
- Darul Uloom Bagbari, Assam, India
- Darul Uloom Zakariyya, Lenasia, South Africa
- Darul Uloom Pretoria, Pretoria, South Africa
- Darul Uloom Birmingham, Birmingham, England
- Darul Uloom Bury, Greater Manchester, England
- Darul Uloom London, London, England
- Darul Uloom Bolton, Bolton, England
- Darul Uloom Al-Madania, Buffalo, New York
- Masjid Darussalam, Lombard, Illinois, United States
- Darul Uloom Trinidad and Tobago, Cunupia, Trinidad and Tobago
- Darul Ulum li-Jabhatil Ulamai wal A'imma Ilorin, Kwara State, Nigeria

== See also ==
- List of Islamic seminaries
