= Darul Uloom Bolton =

School in Bolton, UK

Coordinates: 53.5673°N 2.4575°W

Al Jamiahtul Islamiyyah
- Bolton Darul Uloom

Location
- Hawthorne Road; Deane; Bolton, Greater Manchester, BL3 4HF; England

Information
- School type: Fee-paying Independent School
- Motto: Spiritual Enhancement, Educational Advancement
- Religious affiliation: Islam
- Denomination: Sunni
- Established: 1993; 33 years ago
- Local authority: Bolton Council
- Department for Education URN: 130285 Tables
- Ofsted: Reports
- Head teacher: Qari Yakub Nanji
- Gender: Male
- Age range: 11–25
- Enrolment: 200
- Classes offered: Islamic Theology, Hifz, BTEC, A level
- Language: English, Urdu, Bengali, Gujrati, Arabic
- Test average: % achieving 5+ A* – C – 52%
- School fees: Boarding: £3,000; Day students: £1,500
- Website: boltondarululoom.org.uk

Darul Uloom Bolton is an Islamic private secondary school in Bolton, Greater Manchester, England.

== History ==
The institute was founded in 1993 and initially was based at Bromley Cross in the northern part of Borough of Bolton. In 2006, due to the growth of the institute and demand in pupil places, the institute decided to sell the Bromley Cross premises for a bigger campus closer to the town centre. A bid was put in by the local council to buy the building and adjacent land to build a new houses. Subsequently, the institute relocated to a former convent, where they are based now. In 2008, a former public house was purchased and turned into a second campus for the institute.

== Education ==
The Darul Uloom strives to produce Islamic scholars of high standards, aiming to include both religious and secular education provisions.

=== Religious education ===
The Islamic education is split into two courses: Islamic Theology course and Hifz (Qur'anic memorisation) course. The Islamic Theology course is for those that want to learn about theological underpinnings of Islam. The curriculum is based on the Dars-i Nizami teaching format that has been in place since the establishment of Darul Uloom Deoband, it is rooted in the Hanafi school of thought. The students are taught many books in relation to subjects such as Tafsir, Hadith, Arabic language, grammar and syntax, Islamic jurisprudence, logic and reasoning and public speaking classes. The course is made up of 7 stages. The Hifz course is for those that want to memorise the Holy Qur'an. This course depends on how long students take to memorise the Holy Qur'an; they are given the guidance and support by their personal tutor.

=== Secular education ===
The school provides school students from the ages of 11–16 secondary-age teaching, which enables them to sit their GCSEs when they reach years 10 and 11. The school offers many subjects to choose to study at GCSE level, including but not limited to Maths, English, Science, History, Geography, Religious Studies, ICT, Modern Foreign Languages and Citizenship. Beyond GCSEs, the school also allows students to complete A-Level and BTEC courses.

== Ofsted inspection ==
The institute has had many continuous Ofsted inspections, and it is currently 'Inadequate'. It previously had a rating of 'Requires improvement'.

== See also ==
- Darul Uloom Bury
- Darul Uloom Al-Madania
- Darul Uloom London
- Darul Uloom Zakariyya
- Jamiatul Ilm Wal Huda
- Madinatul Uloom Al Islamiya
- Mazahirul Uloom Saharanpur
