= Abu Yusuf Riyadh ul Haq =

British Islamic scholar (born 1971)

Shaykhul-Hadith Riyadh ul Haq
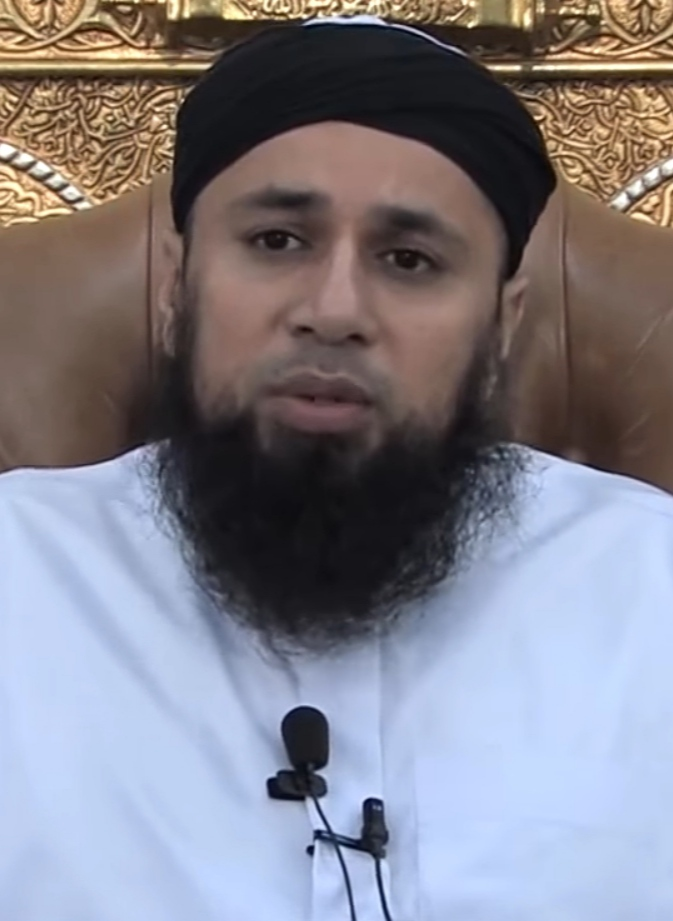
- Riyadh ul Haq in 2022

Personal life
- Born: 15 June 1971 (age 55) Nani Naroli, Surat, Gujarat, India
- Notable work: Al Kawthar Academy
- Education: Darul Uloom Bury
- Occupation: Khatib
- Website: http://akacademy.org/shaykhriyadhulhaq/

Religious life
- Religion: Islam
- Denomination: Sunni
- Jurisprudence: Hanafi
- Movement: Deobandi

Muslim leader
- Teacher: Yusuf Motala; Mahmood Hasan Gangohi; Yunus Jaunpuri

Riyadh ul Haq (born 1971) is a British Islamic scholar. He has been lecturing and teaching as the lead scholar at Al Kawthar Academy, Leicester since 2004.

== Early life ==
Riyadh ul Haq was born in the village of Nani Naroli, Gujarat, India in 1971 and moved to Leicester at the age of three with his father who was an Imam at one of the mosques in the city. His father, Muhammad Gora, was a scholar and the family were treated with a lot of respect by the community.

== Education ==
=== Darul Uloom al Arabiyyah al Islamiyyah ===
In 1984, aged thirteen Shaykh Riyadh ul Haq enrolled at Darul Uloom al Arabiyyah al Islamiyyah, Bury, UK. Due to his academic abilities, he was fast-tracked into adult classes within a year of arrival at the seminary.

==== Authorisation ====
He has ijazah (authorisation) in various Islamic sciences from Yusuf Motala and the late Islam ul Haq. He also has ijazah in ḥadīth from Mahmood Hasan Gangohi and Muhammad Yunus Jaunpuri of Mazahir Uloom, Saharanpur, India.

== Career ==
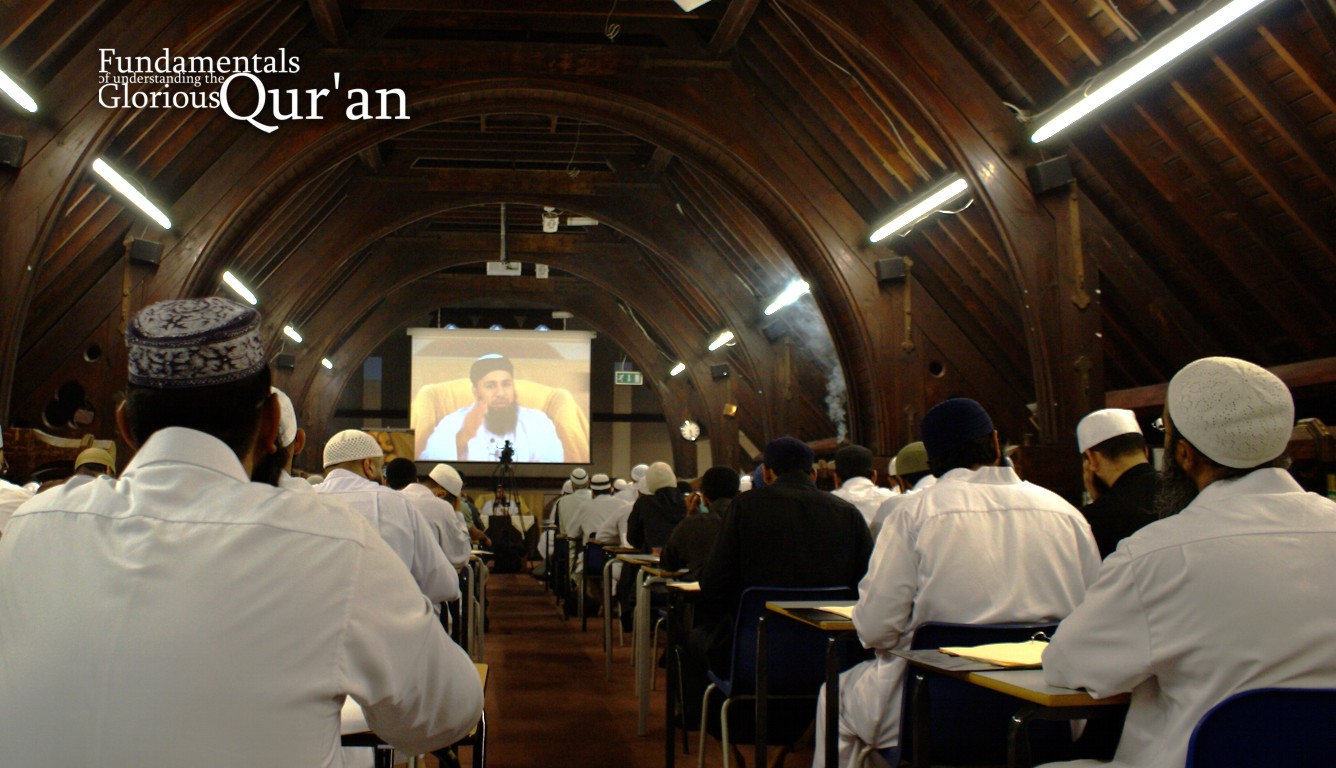
Riyadh ul Haq teaching 'Fundamentals of Understanding the Glorious Qur'an' Course in London, June 2009

=== Early work ===
After his graduation, he became the Khaṭīb of Birmingham Central Mosque at the age of 21. He was recruited as the Khaṭīb not only for his scholarship but also because of his ability to deliver the Friday sermon in Urdu, English and Arabic. At this time he also began teaching ḥadīth at Madinatul Uloom al Islamiyyah, Kidderminster, UK. Until 2003, Riyadh ul Haq served as the honorary headmaster of Madinatul Uloom Al-Islamiyyah, where he was previously Sadr Mudarris (head teacher/dean of the faculty).

=== Al Kawthar Academy ===
Since 2004, Riyadh ul Haq has been the lead scholar at Al Kawthar Academy, Leicester. Al Kawthar Academy has been described as one of the "most important part-time Islamic colleges" in the UK. The Al Kawthar Academy offers a range of Islamic educational courses including up to alim-level. Riyadh ul Haq is accredited with developing the curriculum for their seven-year alim course, taught with 12 hours of study per week.

=== Lectures and Publications ===
Since graduation he has devoted himself to the work of religion and actively engaged in propagation of Islam and teaching. He has taught and commented on numerous classical Islamic works and has lectured extensively on a range of topics including Qurʼānic tafsīr, ḥadīth, aqīdah, fiqh and spirituality. He has also travelled widely, teaching and lecturing in various countries in the Middle East, Africa, Europe and North America. Many of his sermons and lectures are recorded and are widely available. He has also authored two books, The Salah of a Believer in the Quran and Sunnah and 'Causes of Disunity'

One of Riyadh ul Haq's most notable contributions to Islamic scholarship has been his detailed commentary of 'The Abridged Sahih al-Bukhari'. which is a comprehensive collection of ḥadīth (sayings and actions of Muhammad). This collection is considered the most important book after the Qur'an for Sunni Muslims. At the time that ul Haq began these lectures in 2001 it was noted that this was the first time that these aḥadīth had been taught in English in a systemic, detailed and thorough manner to the lay public. He has always argued that the hadith are an integral part of Islam and that fiqh (Islamic jurisprudence) cannot be understood without the hadith.

=== Spirituality ===
We may have reason to disagree but disagreement itself is no reason to hate. Our resentment is more a reflection of ourselves than others.

— Riyadh ul Haq,

Alongside teaching of hadith, Riyadh ul Haq focuses on spirituality (tazkiyah). His spiritual teachings, which date back around 20 years, focus on reformation of the character and purification of the soul. His spiritual chain (silsila) is well-documented. Short excerpts from his spiritual discourses are published online. These make it clear that his spiritual teachings cover a range of topics including social etiquettes and responsibility, love, and family ties. His emphasis on tazkiyah has led to him being labelled as a 'Sufi' and attacked by madkhali groups.

== Charitable Work ==
His expertise and experience is sought by many charities, organisations and bodies for whom he regularly lectures for. These include assisting with humanitarian appeals such as Ummah Welfare Trust's, 'Cries of the Ummah' appeal, as well as local community work within Leicestershire (for example Leicestershire Youth Awards 2008 with the Federation of Muslim Organisations). He has also been involved in assisting the work of Halal Monitoring Committee (HMC).

== Influence and international recognition ==
Ul Haq was listed in the 2010 Third Edition of 'The 500 Most Influential Muslims' published by Royal Islamic Strategic Studies Centre. It states: "Abu Yusuf Riyadh ul Haq is a very influential speaker and leading Deobandi scholar in the UK. He has been markedly influential through his work with the Al Kawthar Academy in Leicester. Al Kawthar is a leading Islamic educational institution at the forefront of knowledge proliferation through diverse media forms."

Ul Haq was also listed in the 2012 Second Edition of 'The Muslim 500: The World's 500 Most Influential Muslims 2012'

== Media Portrayal ==
=== Andrew Norfolk Articles ===
In September 2007, The Times published a news item by Andrew Norfolk accusing Riyadh ul Haq of being the "homegrown cleric who loathes the British" and a commentary article from the same author claiming there was a "hardline takeover of British mosques" led by ul Haq. In an opinion piece by the same author on the same date there was a claim that ul Haq was in line to become the spiritual leader of the Deobandi 'sect' in Britain, despite allegedly having extreme views. Andrew Norfolk published further opinion articles in The Times calling the Deobandis historically anti-British, including an article about another Deobandi scholar, Taqi Usmani.

=== Response of UK Muslim Community ===
Andrew Norfolk's articles have been criticised by various Muslim groups and commentators. Andrew Norfolk's analysis of Deobandis was apparently based on a police report. However, it has been suggested that the source was a report written by an external consultant for the City of London Police, which had been in circulation for over a year before The Times article. The consultant, Mehmood Naqshbandi himself writes 'the attention given to a presumed cadre of extremist and foreign imams preaching in mosques is seriously misplaced'.

Amongst the immediate responses, 'The Guardian carried a "Comment is Free" opinion article by Inayat Bunglawala, media secretary for the Muslim Council of Britain, calling Norfolk's work a "toxic mix of fact and nonsense". The Muslim Public Affairs Committee UK (MPACUK) claimed on their own web-site that even the Berelvis were coming out in defence of Riyadh al Haq. MPACUK also referred to the attacks on ul Haq as a "decapitation strategy" because he pro-actively advocated political activism.

=== Condemnation of Terrorism ===
Riyadh ul Haq joined religious leaders and the wider Muslim community in Leicestershire in condemning the murder of Lee Rigby in May 2013. He 'expressed his deepest sadness and condemnation at what unfolded in Woolwich'.

== Publications ==
=== Books ===
- The Salah of a Believer in the Qur'an and Sunnah (ISI: Birmingham, 2002)
- Causes of Disunity (ISI: Birmingham, 1998)

=== Poems ===
- Whispers of the Night (ISI: Birmingham, July 2000)

== See more ==
- List of Deobandis
