= Ahmed Ali Badarpuri =

Indian Islamic scholar and activist

Sheikh al-Hadith, Maulana Ahmed Ali Badarpuri احمد علی بدر پوری
- আহমদ আলী বদরপুরী

2nd President of Assam State Jamiat Ulama-e-Hind
- In office 1957 – 11 June 2000
- Preceded by: Noor Ali Badarpuri
- Succeeded by: Maulana Abdul Haque

Amir-e-Shariat of Northeast India
- In office 1990 – 11 June 2000

Personal details
- Born: Ahmed Ali; 1915 Badarpur, Sylhet district, British India
- Died: 11 June 2000 (aged 84–85) Mumbai, Maharashtra, India
- Children: Yahya
- Education: Sylhet Government Alia Madrasah; Darul Uloom Deoband

Personal life
- Main interest(s): Sufism, Tafsir, Fiqh, Hadith

Religious life
- Religion: Islam
- Denomination: Sunni
- Jurisprudence: Hanafi
- Movement: Deobandi

Muslim leader
- Teacher: Hussain Ahmad Madani, Izaz Ali Amrohi
- Disciple of: Hussain Ahmad Madani

Ahmed Ali Badarpuri (1915–11 June 2000), also known as Ahmed Ali Banskandi and Ahmed Ali Assami, was an Indian Islamic scholar, a Sufi, a freedom fighter, and a teacher. He was the president of the Assam State Jamiat Ulama-e-Hind for 44 years.

== Early life and education ==
Ahmed Ali Badarpuri was born in 1915 into a Sufi family in Badarpur, Assam, then located in the Sylhet district of British India. He was a descendant of Munawwar Khadim Yemeni, who was an attendant of Shah Jalal Mujarrad's authorised disciple, Sikandar Khan Ghazi.

Badarpuri received his primary education in Badarpur and then enrolled at the Sylhet Government Alia Madrasah for further studies from 1938 to 1940 and graduated in dars-e-nizami. He subsequently joined Darul Uloom Deoband to study the courses again but could not continue due to certain health complications. In 1950, he attended the Deoband seminary once more to study the courses of Daura-e-Hadith (The last year in dars-e-nizami) and Daura-e-Tafsir (specialisation in the exegesis of the Quran), and completed his studies by the next year. At that time, he memorized the Quran in a period of two and a half months. His teachers included Hussain Ahmad Madani, Abdus Samī' Deobandi, Izaz Ali Amrohi, Fakhrul Hasan Muradabadi, and Abdul Ahad Deobandi. He was an authorised disciple of Madani in Sufism.

== Career ==
Badarpuri started his career as a teacher at Darul Uloom Banskandi. In 1955, Hussain Ahmad Madani sent him there without any invitation from the institution. The madrassa authority refused to appoint him as a teacher. However, they later accepted him after they obtained a letter from Madani.

In 1957, Madani appointed him to the post of Sheikh al-Hadith and entrusted to him the charge of the institution. He retained his position until his last breath. Thus, his teaching career lasted for over 45 years. He associated himself with the Indian independence movement.

In 1957, he was elected president of the Assam State Jamiat Ulama-e-Hind. Before it, he had worked as a secretary and convener. He carried out his leadership responsibilities by facing the Pakistani Deportation Movement, also known as the Bongal Kheda Movement, which intensified in the 1960s and continued into the 1970s and 1980s.

He raised a voice against the then-Chaliha government and forced it to stop inhumane violence towards minorities in the name of foreigners. He opposed the Assam Movement, which peaked with the Nellie massacre. He forced Hiteswar Saikia, law minister Abdul Muhib Mazumdar, and Prime Minister Indira Gandhi to provide some special protections for minorities. The result was the IMDT Act of 1983.

In the early 1990s, Badarpuri had to face another movement known as the Bodo Movement, which created a cruel massacre in lower Assam. He raised a strong demand with the government for the security and rehabilitation of the victims. Shouldering the burden of 600 homeless orphans affected by this movement, he sheltered them in Banskandi Madrasa. Thus, he fought against any kind of injustice and finally against some communal remarks made by the government in arranging a historical Jamiat meeting at Guwahati on 1 April 2000.

Badarpuri participated in the freedom struggle being inspired by his teacher, Hussain Ahmad Madani. He was arrested and imprisoned several times for anti-British activities. He worked in support of the Jamiat and opposed the partition of India. He took a bold step to get Sylhet into India during the Sylhet Referendum held in July 1947.

He founded thousands of mosques, madrasas, and khanqahs, and finally the Gauhati Khanqah, where thousands of people visit every year seeking spiritual guidance. He opposed the hypocrisy and deviance of the Qadianis. He even wrote a book in Bangla, named Khatme Nabuwwater O Qadianiater Gumrahir Akatya Dalil Samooh (transl. Irrefutable Proofs of Khatm-e-Nabuwwat and the Deviances of the Qadianis).

== Honours and positions ==
After the demise of Badarpuri, the Tarun Gogoi government started the Ahmed Ali Banskandi Award in his honor. Since 1990, he has also served as the Amir-e-Shariat of Northeast India until his death.

== Literary works ==
Badarpuri wrote a number of books in Bengali, Assamese, and Urdu. These include:

- Alam-e-Barzakh (Bengali and Assamese; transl. The World Between Death and Resurrection)
- Pabitra Haram Trayer Itihas (Bengali; transl. The History of the Three Holy Mosques)
- Jamiat-er Mul Katha (Bengali; transl. Key Points of Jamiat Ulama-e-Hind)
- Elme Ma'rifater Bishista Bahantray O Mashaekh Charit (Bengali; transl. The Three Main Vehicles of Gnosis and Biographies of Sufi Scholars)
- Fazail-e-Shaban, Ramadan O Fazail-e-Nafil Roja (Assamese; transl. Virtues Of Shaban, Ramadan and Voluntary Fasting)
- Khatme Nabuwwater O Qadianiater Gumrahir Akatya Dalil Samooh (Bengali; transl. Irrefutable Proofs of Khatme Nabuwwat and the Deviances of the Qadianis)
- Zuhur-e-Mahdi O Nuzool-e-Isa (Urdu and Bengali; transl. The Appearance of Imam Mahdi and the Arrival of the Prophet Isa)
- Salasil-e-Tayyiba (Bengali; transl. The Holy Chains of the Sufi Scholars)
- Fuyūz-e-Madani (Urdu translation of Ahmed Ali's book Salasil-e-Tayyiba, written in Bengali)

== Death and legacy ==
On 11 June 2000, Badarpuri died in Mumbai. His body was flown to Assam. On 13 June, he was buried on the campus of Darul Uloom Banskandi. His funeral prayer was attended by several hundred thousand people. He is survived by his son, Muhammad Yahya. Many individuals expressed condolences upon the demise of Badarpuri. As'ad Madani termed his death one of the greatest tragedies of the 20th century. Sonia Gandhi called him a freedom fighter who always tried to maintain peace and social harmony among the different sections of people. Prafulla Kumar Mahanta, the then chief minister of Assam, called him a symbol of peace, love, and social harmony. Santosh Mohan Dev opined that his death was a loss to the whole country.

== See also ==
- List of Deobandis
