= Uloom =

Uloom may refer to:

== People ==
- Ibrahim Bahr al-Uloom (born 1954), Iraqi politician
- Mohammad Bahr al-Uloom (1927–2015), Iraqi political figure

== Other uses ==
- Darul uloom (disambiguation)
