= Nani Naroli =

Village in Surat, Gujarat, India

Nani Naroli is a village in Surat district, State of Gujarat India. Located 15 kilometres (15,000 m) away from the Kim Char Rasta highway, the village currently has a population of up to 10,000 people. It occupies a land area of 1795-49-48 hectares, but is expanding due to the rise in population. village is well known for coal mine, gipcl company located in this village aprt from it most of people dependent on agriculture, In the early 1960s, the village primarily consisted of mud-built homes without electricity. Water was brought into residence in 1963. The village was primarily agricultural in the 1980s and early 1990s, cultivating cotton, rice, wheat, lentil, sesame, mung lentil, gram lentil and many more vegetables with the aid of farm animals such as horses, buffaloes, and bulls.

== Notable people ==
- Yusuf Motala, founder of Darul Uloom Bury
- Riyadh ul Haq, lead scholar of Al Kawthar Academy, Leicester
