= UWT =

UWT may refer to:

- Ummah Welfare Trust, a United Kingdom-based Islamic charity
- Union of Women Teachers, a former trade union in the United Kingdom
- University of Washington Tacoma, in Washington state, United States
- University of West Tennessee College of Medicine and Surgery, a defunct black medical college in Tennessee, United States
- UWT, part of a UCI race classification meaning UCI World Tour
- Undecimated wavelet transform, or stationary wavelet transform, a wavelet transform algorithm
