= Muhammad Al-Labani =

Writer and researcher in critical and intellectual studies

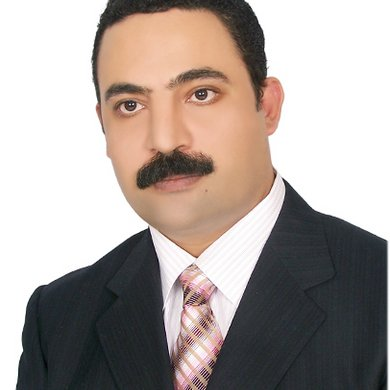
- Born: 1970 (age 55–56); Beheira Governorate, Egypt
- Awards: Tayeb Salih International Award for Written Creativity 2018; Rashid Award for Creativity 2019-2020; Katara Prize for Arabic Fiction 2020; Critical Studies Category Award 2020

Muhammad Ismail Al-Labani (Arabic: محمد اللباني) is an Egyptian writer and researcher in critical and intellectual studies.

== Life and career ==
He was born in Edku in the Beheira Governorate in 1970 and resides in Alexandria.

He graduated from the Faculty of Dar Al-Ulum Cairo University in 1993, after obtaining a high school diploma from Edku School in 1989. He obtained a diploma in Education and a Pre-Master in Literary Criticism. He worked in Egypt and the UAE in the field of teaching, combining teaching and writing. His writing passion and research interest always turns towards critical, intellectual and philosophical studies.

== Literary output ==
He has received many awards, including: Rashid Prize for Creativity, and he was awarded the Critical Studies Category for his study of the identity of modernization between the centrality of the self and the dialogue of the other. He also received the Al-Tayeb Salih International Award for Written Creativity in its eighth session, in the critical studies category, for his study: “The Echo of Memory… A Study in the Aesthetics of Narrative Place”. He also won the Katara Prize for Arabic Novel in its sixth session for his study: "Representations of the Pragmatic Curve in Narrative, Ghassan Kanafani as a Model ".

=== His most important critical and intellectual books ===
- Revolutionary sense in the poetry of Nizar Qabbani.
- The novel Stream of Consciousness: Edward Al-Kharrat as a model, published in Sharjah House, Department of Culture and Information in 1999, and participated in the Sharjah Prize for Arab and Intellectual Creativity, in its second session in 1998.
- Echo of Memory. A study in the aesthetics of the narrative space, participated in the Tayeb Salih International Prize for Written Literature, the eighth session, 2018. Among his most important critical and cultural articles:
- Abdo Khal: in the cities eat grass, "agency Attia: a picture of society marginalized, August 2011.
- Study "Betrayal of the Intellectual Between Said and Gramsci", "Saramago, a Writer Who Lived in Memory and Died Defending Just Causes".
- "Time and Nostalgia for Slowness", in which he criticizes Milan Kundera's novel "Slowness", which focuses on the human position on time, and how he turned into a time killer.
- And also “A chameleon or a search for the truth”, “ Taha Hussein, a blind man who guides the sighted to the lights of science and knowledge “the power of knowledge”, “the game of masks in the rituals of signs and news”, “human sympathy”, “Orientalism, a renewed reading in the era of globalization”.
- Mohammed Arkoun, philosopher of Islamic Thought It roots "humanization", "Balcony of Laila Murad and Baudelaire, in an interview with text reading and interpreting".
- "Electronic Publishing", "A Window for Dialogue", "Positives of the Economic Crisis", "The Future of the Genetic Revolution and the Philosophy of Science". "Nietzsche, the philosopher against the absolute," archaeologically concerned, profile its foundation."

=== His most important articles ===
- Abdo Khal in cities eat grass, "agency Attia: a picture of society marginalized, August 2011.
- His most important story:
- The novel Stream of Consciousness Edward Al-Kharrat, as an example, which was published in Sharjah House: Department of Culture and Information in 1999, and which participated in the Sharjah Prize for Arab and Intellectual Creativity, in its second session in 1998.
