= Jamia Siddiqia =

Islamic seminary in Karachi, Pakistan

- جامعہ صدیقیہ
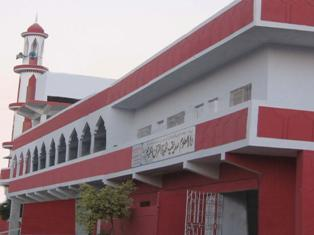
- Motto: رَبِّ زدْنيِ عِلْماً
- Type: Islamic seminary
- Established: 1990
- Founders: Maulana Mashkoor Hashmi
- Religious affiliation: Deobandi Sunni Islam
- Academic affiliations: Wifaq ul Madaris Al Arabia Pakistan & Board of Secandry Education Karachi
- Students: +500
- Location: Karachi, Sindh, Pakistan
- Website: web.archive.org/web/20110713080938/http://www.jamiasiddiqia.com

Jamia Dar-ul-Uloom Siddiqia (Urdu: جامعہ دارالعلوم صدیقیہ) is an Islamic seminary located in the North Karachi area of Karachi, Pakistan. It is considered as one of the most successful Islamic seminary which is dealing in traditional studies of the Quran, Sunnah and Fiqha with modern techniques.

Renowned orthodox Hanafi Cleric Maulana Mashkoor Hashmi is the founder and Principal of this seminary. About 1000 students are getting there Islamic and modern education and availing free hostel facilities in the seminary.

== Foundation ==
Jamia Darululoom Siddiqia was founded on 12 February 1990 by a cleric ‘Maulana Mashkoor Hashmi. He chose the name "Siddiqia" for this newly established seminary on the name of his beloved teacher and renowned orthodox deobandi Cleric of subcontinent Molana Siddiq Ahmed Bandvi(r) late.

== Affiliation ==
Jamia Darululoom Siddiqia is a prominent institute of Ahl-e-Sunnat Wal Jamat. All the teachers and the students of this institute are cordially affiliated with the doctrine of revolutionary deobandi movement of Indian sabcontinant.

Jamia Darululoom Siddiqia is formally allied with the local board of Islamic seminaries, Wifaq ul Madaris Al Arabia Pakistan, which is the largest board of Islamic Seminaries all around the world. Therefore, Jamia Daruloom Siddiqia relied on Wifaq ul Madris to make all the arrangements for conducting annual examination at all the levels.

Administration of Jamia is also taking significant steps to be affiliated with the Boards of Secondary Education and the Board of Higher Secondary Education, Karachi.

== Significants ==
Jamia Darululoom Siddiqia is included in some of those Islamic seminaries where modern and mainstream education, (from school to the college level) are also given with traditional Dars-i Nizami course of The Quran, Hadees and Fiqah.

== Departments ==
Jamia Darululoom Siddiqia has the following nine different departments.

- Department of Nazra and Hifz
- Department of Darse-Nizami
- Department of Banat (Girls Campus)
- Department of Mastoraat (Adult Woman Campus)
- Department of Fehme-Deen (Adult Men Campus)
- Department of English and Arabi
- Computer Lab
- Library
- Science Libertarian

== Pictures ==
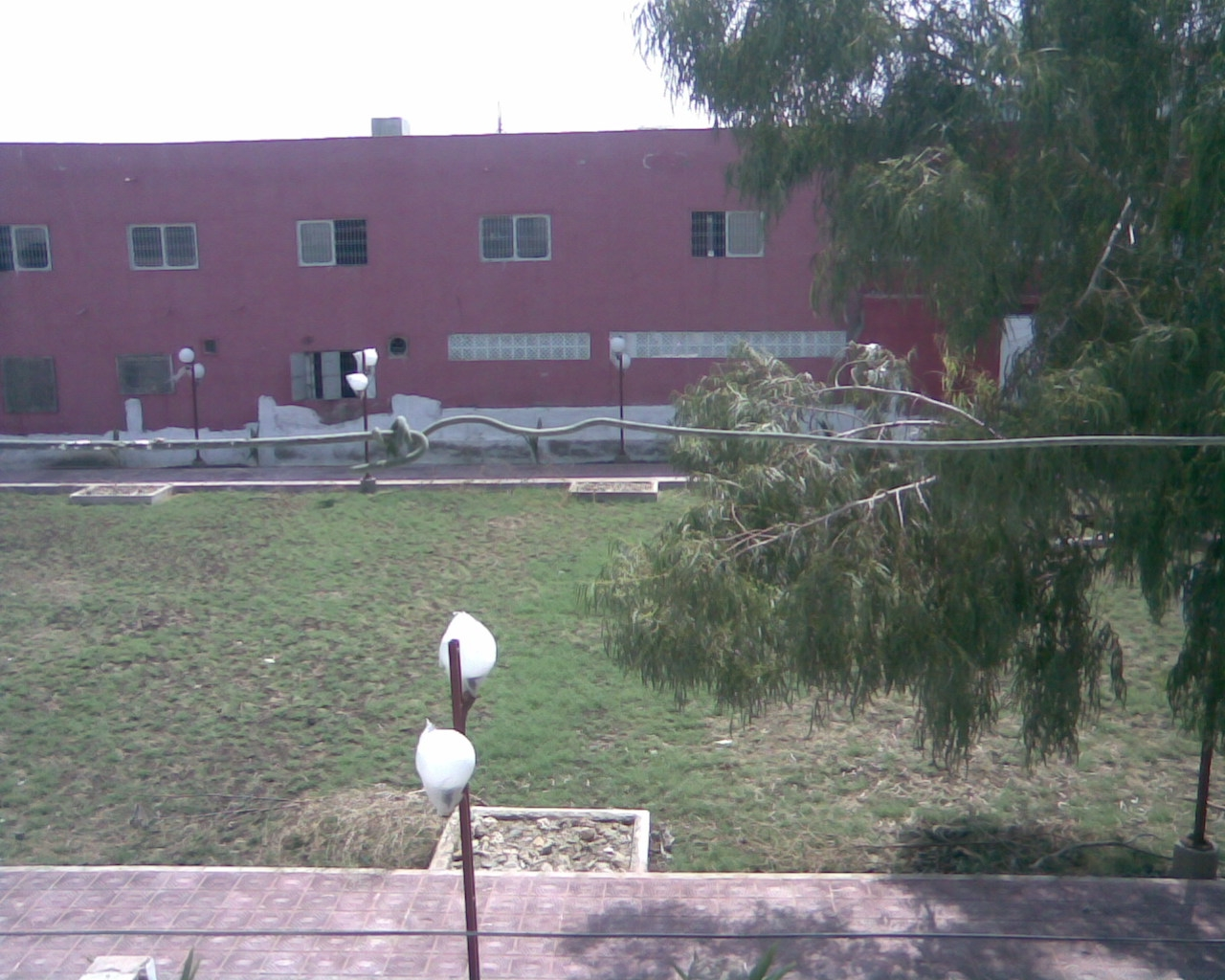
Jamia Siddiqia

Jama Masjid Khizra

Masjid & Jamia

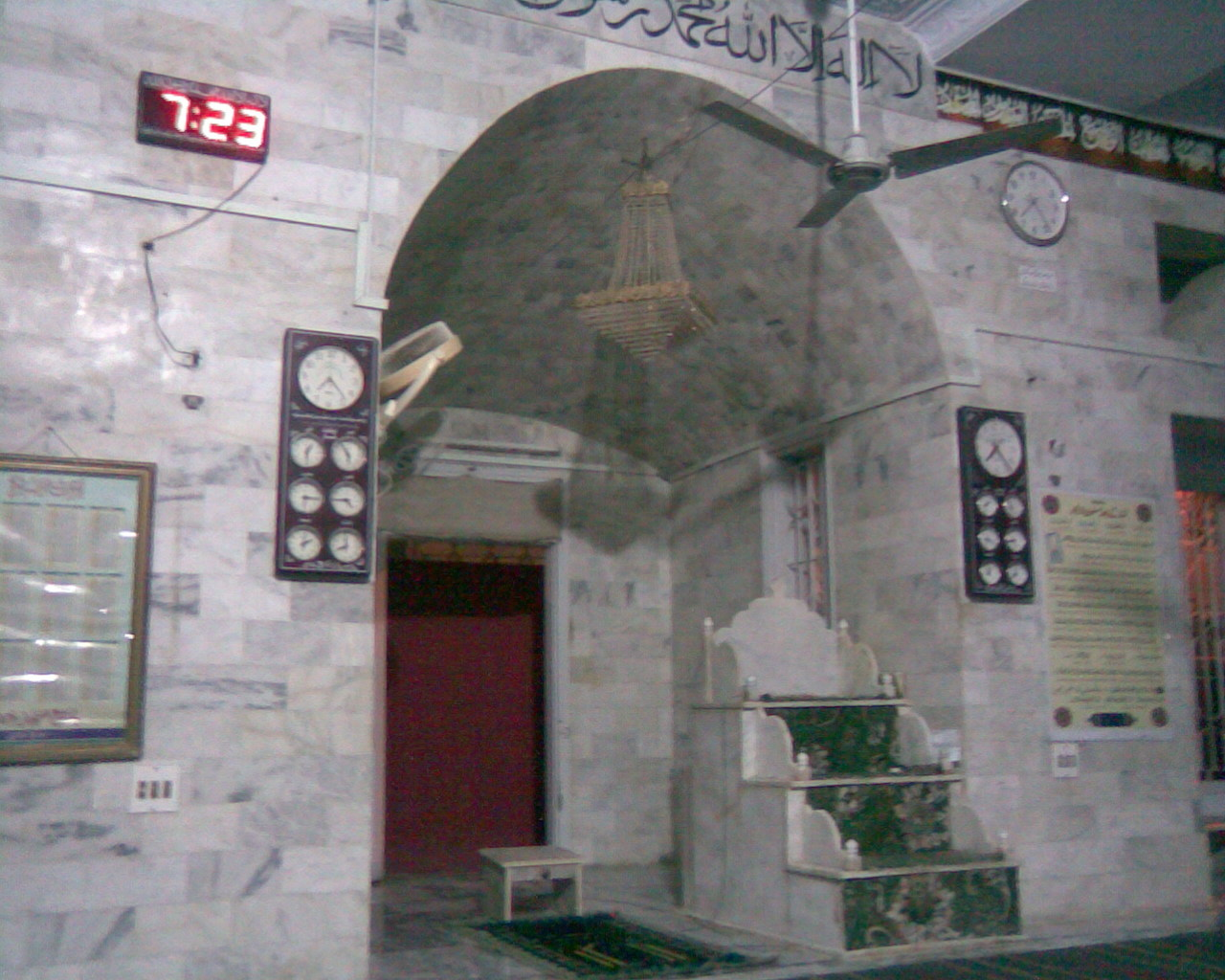
Masjid Khizra

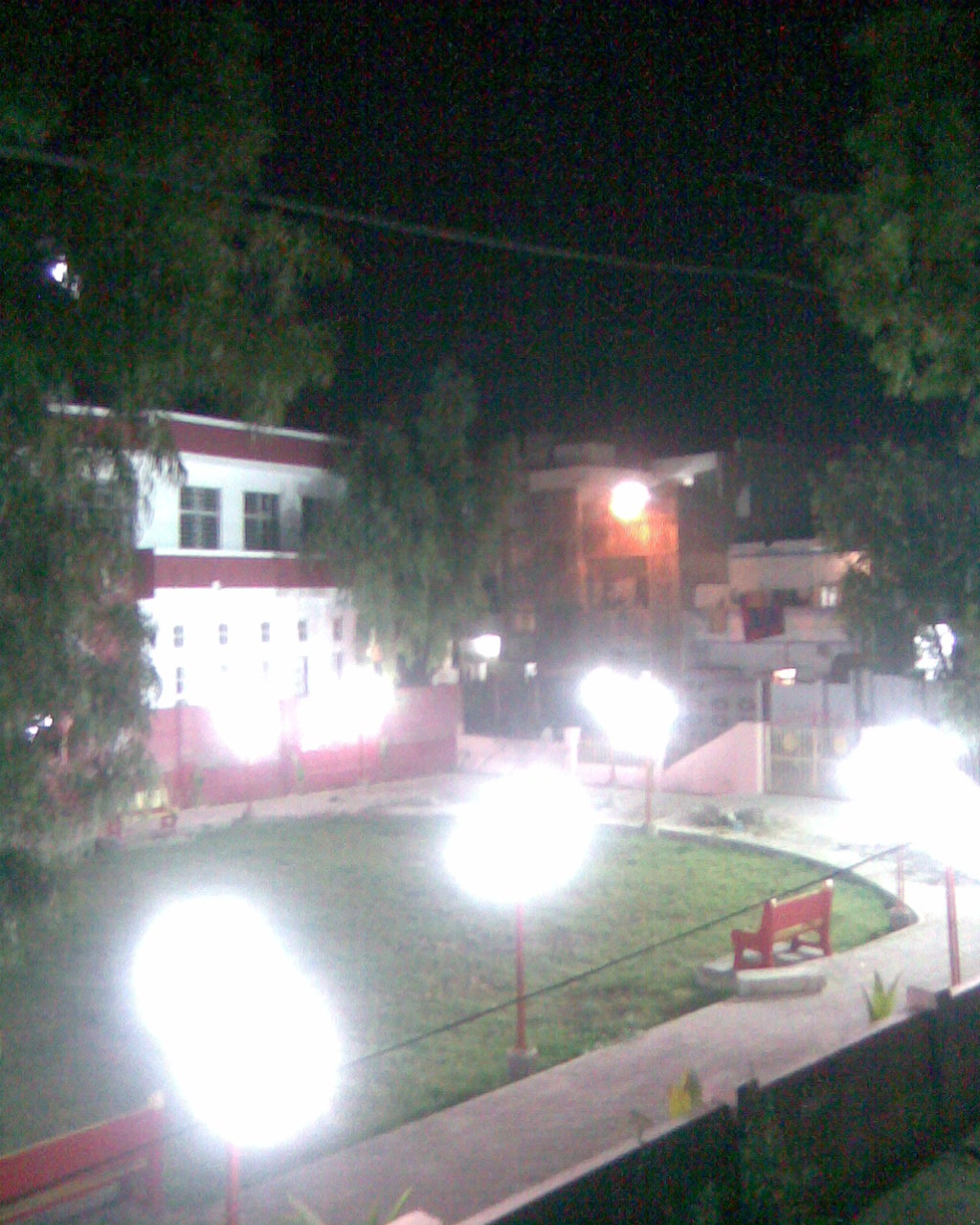
Jamia Siddiqia

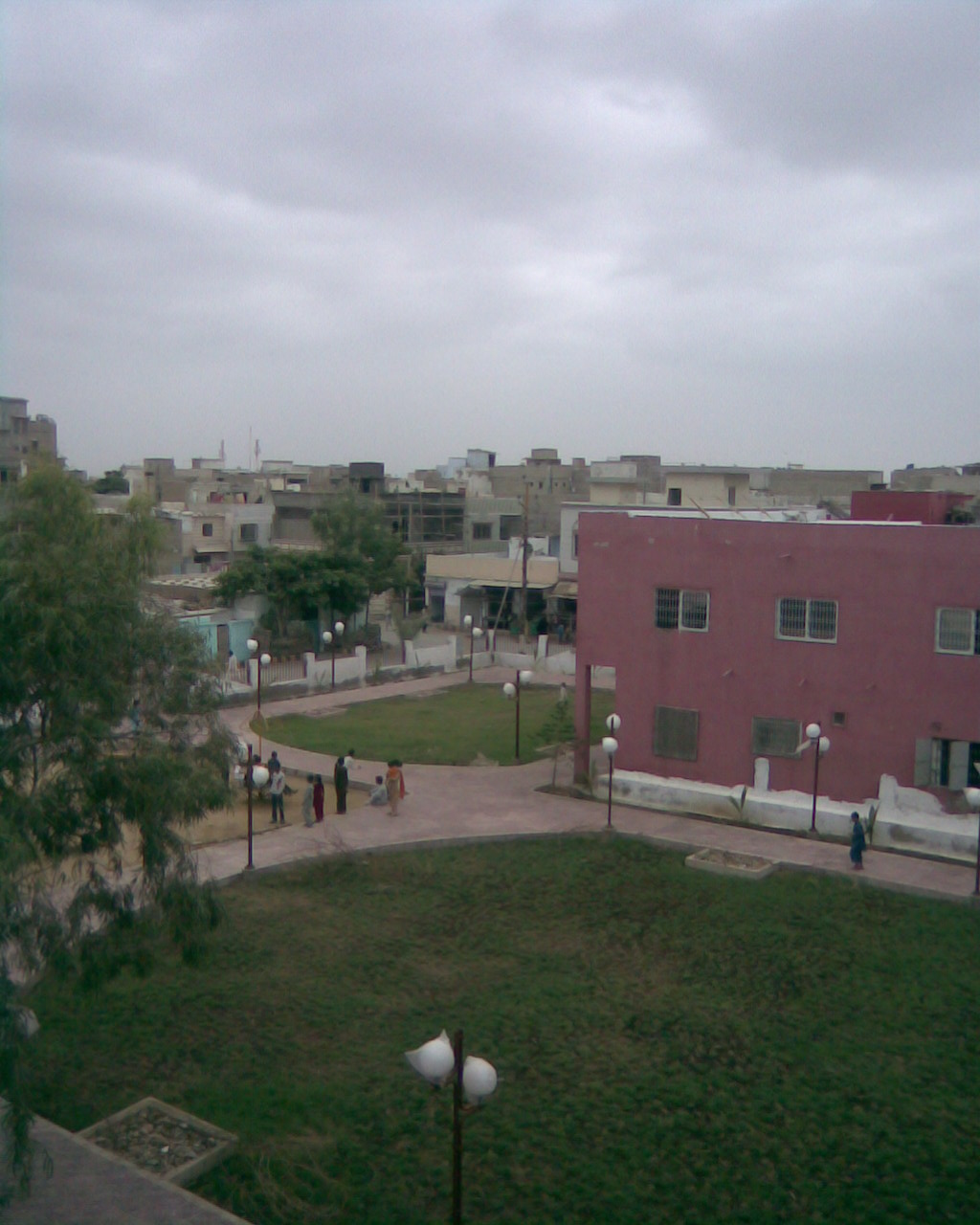
Jamia Siddiqia

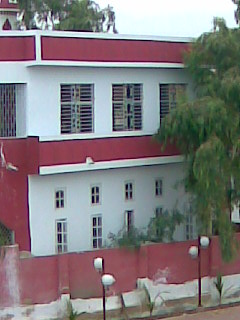
Jamia Siddiqia

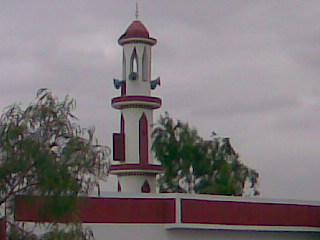
Jamia Siddiqia

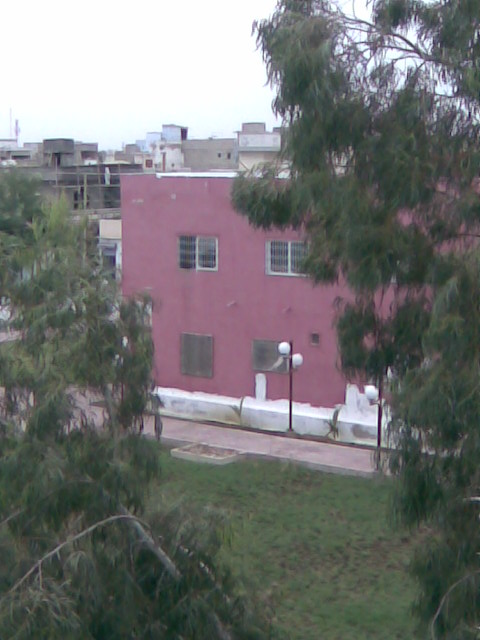
Jamia Siddiqia

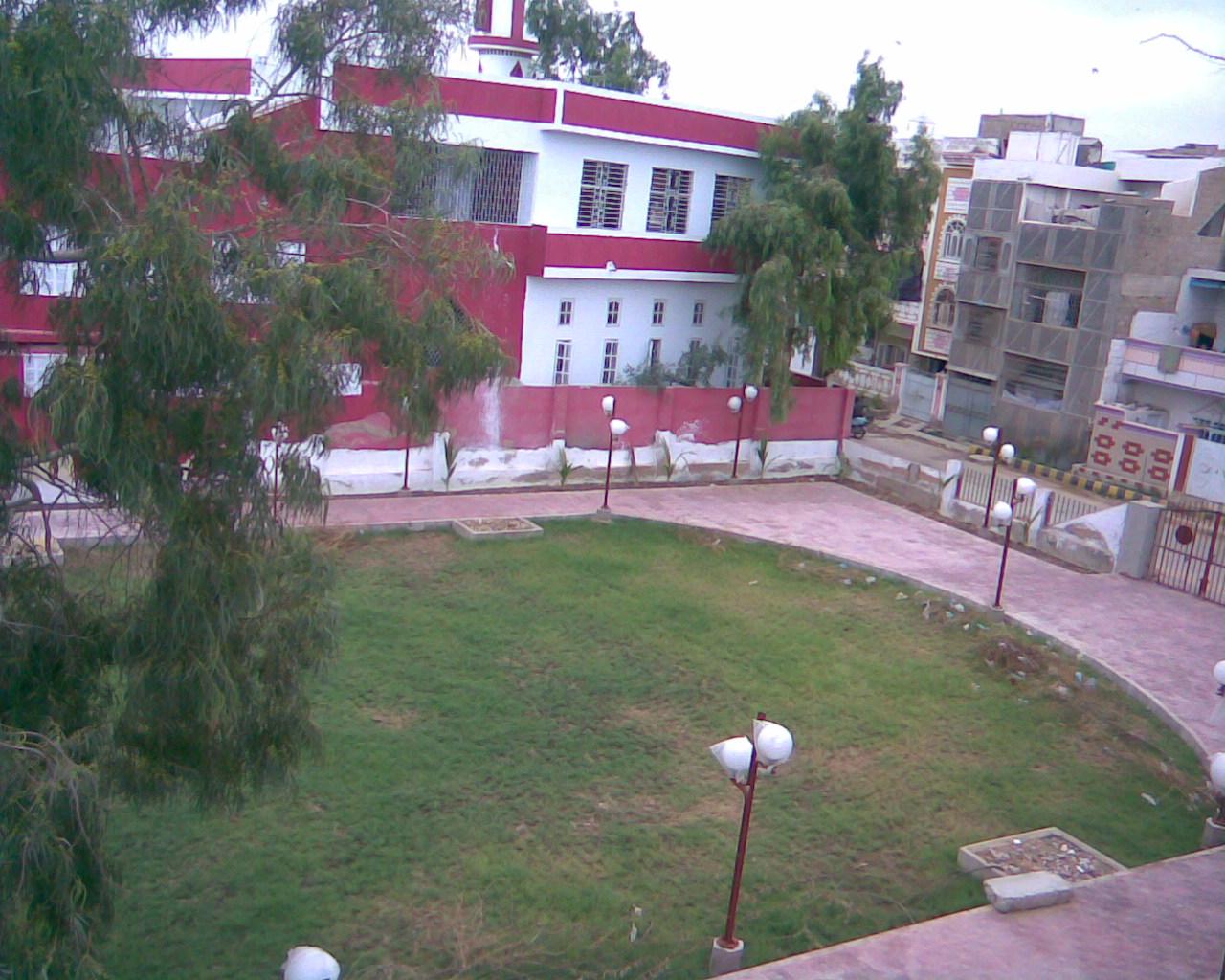
Jamia Siddiqia
