= Firangi Mahal =

Building complex in Lucknow, India

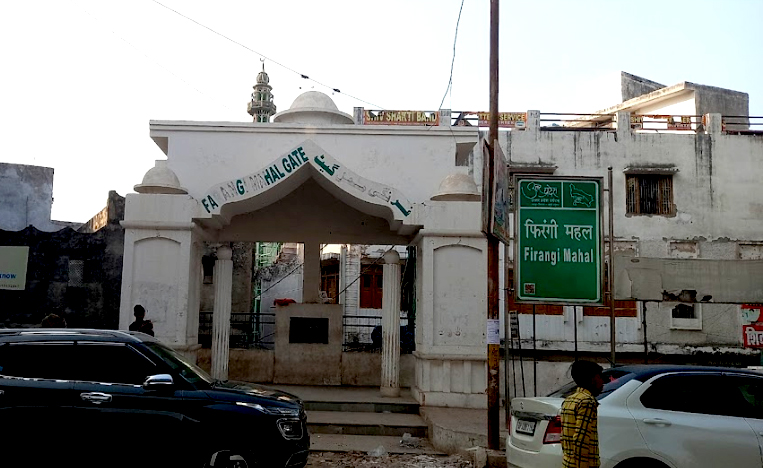

- Location within India
- Location: Lucknow, Uttar Pradesh, India

History
- Built: 17th century

Firangi Mahal is a building complex located in Lucknow, Uttar Pradesh, India. The word Firang (originally referring to Franks) refers to Europeans and Mahal means palace in Persian. The name originated from the fact that original owners of this Mahal were Europeans. During the period of Mughal Emperor Aurangzeb, some French businessmen used to stay at this Mahal when they visited, such as the first owner of this Mahal, Niel. The building was an architectural building of some repute but was later confiscated by the government.

It was later given over to the adviser Aurangzeb known as Mullah Asad bin Qutub Shaheed and his brother Mulla Saeed bin Qutubuddin Shaheed. These two brothers made this Mahal a center of Islamic learning. It has been compared with Cambridge University and Oxford University as a center of culture and learning.

== Khilafat Movement ==
During the period of the Khilafat Movement, Mahatma Gandhi once stayed for some time in Firangi Mahal and brought his goat with him. The Muslims in and around the Firangi Mahal stopped consuming meat during his stay, as a token of respect. Maulvi Abdul Bari claimed Gandhi as a leader of both Hindus and Muslims. Bari was a strong advocate of Hindu-Muslim unity in the nation. Leaders like Jawaharlal Nehru and Sarojini Naidu were among those who visited Firangi Mahal to bring all the communities in the fold of freedom struggle. The ulema from the Firangi Mahal were in favour of the Khilafat Movement. However, the ulema were sentenced to death by the British for issuing a jihad fatwa against them.

== Notable personalities ==
- Nizamuddin Sihalivi, Indian Islamic scholar who compiled the syllabus of Dars-i Nizami
- Abdul Bari Firangi Mahali, Muslim scholar, he issued a fatwa for jihad against the British Raj.
- Abdul Hayy Lucknawi Firangi Mahali, Indian Islamic scholar
