= Jami Masjid and Islamic Centre Birmingham =

Mosque in Birmingham, England

Coordinates: 52.4685°N 1.8560°W

The Jami Masjid and Islamic Centre Birmingham is a mosque in Birmingham, England. It includes a two-hall mosque, with a capacity of 2,000, and a separate building for the Darul Uloom, an Islamic school.

Jami Mosque & Islamic Centre Birmingham (JMIC) was established in 1973 by a number of leading members of the Community with the purchase of 523 Coventry Road. Since then, the Mosque has grown significantly over the years through the purchase of adjacent properties. The centre houses 2 large prayer halls which can hold up to a thousand people and a separate prayer facility for sisters. They have an established tradition for providing Islamic education for children. Their evening maktab started in 1975, followed by our Hifz madrasa in 1983 and the full time Darul Uloom boys secondary school began in 1985. They have also been providing Islamic education for adults since 1992. They have a dedicated funeral services which has been operational from 1995.

It was a founding member of the Islamic Sharia Council.

== See also ==
- Islam in England
- List of mosques in the United Kingdom
