= Nahar The Mask =

Nahar bin Mohammed
- Born: August 23, 1986 (age 40); Riyadh, Saudi Arabia
- Other name: Nahar the Mask

Comedy career
- Years active: 2007 – present
- Medium: Fashion, YouTube, television
- Genre: Fashion

Nahar (Arabic: المقنع نهار) is a Saudi fashion personality, born 23 August 1986, behind the persona of “The Mask”. He has appeared in several magazines, newspapers, and other media.

== Early life ==
Nahar bin Mohammed was born in Riyadh, Saudi Arabia.

== Acting ==
Nahar began performing as an actor in school productions while studying at Dar Al Uloom University, from which he graduated in the summer of 2004.

After several commercial campaigns, in 2005 Nahar was approached by the Saudi author Meshal Alrasheed to play a role in several Saudi theater performances. Wa Al Nass Nyam was one of Nahar's most successful plays.

== The Mask ==
Nahar has said that he believes every artist must have their own personality and character. The concept of the mask is about self-awareness and emphasizing that the form in which God created us is outside our control, so we have to focus on what we wear and how we choose to present ourselves in front of others.

== Fashion career ==
Nahar became well known when his group gained a number of followers starting to notice differences.

Nahar had the goals of helping establish a Saudi language of fashion and to grow the Saudi fashion industry within the Gulf Cooperation Council, correcting misunderstandings about the fashion industry in Saudi society, and helping youth know how to represent their personality through their clothes.

=== Harvey Nichols ===
In 2012, Harvey Nichols signed Nahar to be the face of their campaign for the men's department as its only Saudi male model, followed by other projects such as Mini Chic By Nahar in 2013, Mix&Match by Nahar in 2012, and the Best of Britain Fashion Show as an art director in 2013.

=== Local Brands ===
Nahar collaborated with Nosh Designs' local brand on a designing workshop. In 2013, Nahar signed with T-shirt Art Company as the fashion & creative director for their spring/summer and fall/winter collections.

In 2014, Nahar signed with 38 Store as a creative director and host for their Nahar Triangle event in Riyadh.

=== Kuwait ===
In 2014, Nahar was approached by the Kuwaiti company 7 Media. He collaborated with Kuwaiti fashion company ALOSTOURA on a project called Nahar's Picks.

=== TV appearances ===
Nahar was featured on an episode of the TV show Sabah Alkeer Ya Arab on the MBC network in 2013.
