= Jamia Salafia, Varanasi =

Islamic Jamia or central seminary university in Varanasi, India

Al-Jamia-tus-Salafiah (Markazi Darul-Uloom) جامعة السلفية وارانسی الهند
- Type: Islamic institute
- Established: 1966
- President: Maulana Shahid Juanid
- Location: Varanasi, Uttar Pradesh, India
- Campus: Semi-Urban
- Nicknames: Jamia Salfia; Varanasi Salafiah University
- Website: aljamiatussalafiah.org

Jamia Salafia, Varanasi (الجامعة السلفية) (Markazi Darul-Uloom) is an Islamic Jamia or central seminary university located in the city of Varanasi in India. Al-Jamia-tus-Salafiah (Markazi Darul-Uloom), Varanasi, India is a prominent center for education and training, born out of the dreams and blessings of the well-wishers of Markzi Jama’at Ahle Hadith Hind. This institution was established in 1963 under the movement of the All India Ahle Hadith Conference, the largest wing of Jama’at Ahle Hadith. It is the largest Salafi-Ahle Hadith institution in India. The university is funded through contributions from Indian citizens and most of the teachers are graduated from Saudi Arabian Islamic universities.

== Departments ==
1. Mutawassita and Sanavia
2. Shariat College
3. Faculty of the teaching of Quran-ul-Kareem
4. Al-Manar Boys’ School
5. Rahmania Boys’ School
