= Azaadville =

- Location within Gauteng Location within South Africa
- Coordinates: 26.1717°S 27.7493°E
- Country: South Africa
- Province: Gauteng
- Municipality: Mogale City

Government
  - Councillor: Shabier Ahmed Dabhelia (ANC)

Area
  - Total: 4.99 km^{2} (1.93 sq mi)

Population (2011)
  - Total: 10,292
  - Density: 2,060/km^{2} (5,340/sq mi)

Racial makeup (2011)
  - Black African: 33.84%
  - Coloured: 1.02%
  - Indian/Asian: 63.59%
  - White: 0.79%
  - Other: 0.75%

First languages (2011)
  - English: 59.77%
  - Setswana: 16.95%
  - isiXhosa: 4.81%
  - Afrikaans: 3.80%
  - isiZulu: 3.32%
- Time zone: UTC+2 (SAST)
- Postal code (street): 1754
- PO box: 1750
- Area code: 011
- Website: http://www.mogalecity.gov.za/

Azaadville (Urdu: آزادول) (Arabic: آزادڤل) is a town in South Africa located in Mogale City in the West Rand region of Gauteng province of South Africa.

== History ==
Azaadville was established as a township around 1965. The Apartheid laws forced the Indian community, who lived in Krugersdorp town and Krugersdorp west, to move out to this new township intended for people of Indian heritage only. The community opposed this forced removal, but had little choice against the Town Council's plans.

A competition was held for a name for the township. The community boycotted the competition; and there was only one entry for the name: Azaadville; by Mr Abbass Nanabhay.

The word 'Azaad' is a Persian word meaning "free". And 'Ville' is a French word meaning "town". There are some other streets in Azaadville with Persian names such as 'Isfahan' and 'Shiraz' which are two big ancient cities in Iran.

== Infrastructure ==
Initially, 25 council houses were built; there were no shops, no schools or other amenities. Children had to travel to Roodepoort Indian School for their schooling.

Azaadville Primary School was built in 1975. Azaadville Secondary School was built in 1981 and the Roodepoort Indian School was then closed down moving all its students to Azaadville.

Azaadville is home to Darul Uloom Azaadville, an institute for Islamic Studies.

The Muslim community soon purchased land from the council to establish a Mosque and madressa complex. The structure was built in 1976 and is a landmark of Azaadville.

The Hindu community also purchased land and built a temple and community hall in 1985.

The Civic Centre and Municipal Library was built around 1981.

== Climate ==
The climate in summer is sunny with occasional short moderate showers. Daytime temperatures range from 20 °C (68 °F) to 30 °C (86 °F). Winter is dry with cold nights and temperatures between 2 °C (36 °F) to 5 °C (41 °F), crisp mornings and glorious, sunny days.
