= Nizamuddin Sihalivi =

Indian Islamic scholar

Nizamuddin Sihalvi al-Ansari

Personal life
- Born: 27 March 1677 Sihali, Awadh, Mughal Empire
- Died: 8 May 1748 (aged 71)
- Education: Firangi Mahal

Religious life
- Religion: Islam
- Denomination: Sunni
- Jurisprudence: Hanafi

Nizamuddin Sihalivi Ansari (27 March 1677 – 8 May 1748) was the founder and designer of the Dars-i Nizami curriculum used in most South Asian madrasas. He was born in Sihali a Village in Fatehpur Block in Barabanki District of Uttar Pradesh now in India, on 27 March 1677, into an Ayyubi Ansari family. Later on he then migrated to Firangi Mahal Lukhnow. His father was Mulla Qatubdeen. He was a disciple of Shah Abdul Razzaq Bansvi in silsala Qadiriyya. He was a descendant of Abu Ayyub al-Ansari.

== Notable work ==
- Dars-i Nizami

He designed and introduced teaching course Dars-i-Nizami in 1748.
