= Al-Rashid Islamic Institute =

- Type: Islamic university
- Established: 1980
- Founders: Shaikhul-Hadith Muhammad Zakariya
- Principal: M. Mazhar Alam Saab
- Academic staff: 20
- Students: Around 200
- Location: Cornwall, Ontario, Canada; 45.03558°N 74.63607°W
- Campus: Urban (18 Acres)
- Website: www.alrashid.ca

Al-Rashid Islamic Institute, is an Islamic institute and seminary in Cornwall, Ontario, Canada. Under the instructions and guidance of Shaikhul-Hadith Moulana Muhammad Zakariya, the institute was founded in 1980 at a temporary location in Montreal. The institute moved to Cornwall in 1985. The institute is now an Islamic university offering higher Islamic studies.

== See also ==
- Darul Uloom
- Darul Uloom Deoband
