= Darul Uloom Al-Madania =

Madrasah in Buffalo, New York, U.S.

Coordinates: 42.89916°N 78.83310°W

Darul Uloom Al Madania
- Type: Islamic Madrasah
- Established: 1991
- President: Masood Memon Makki (Damat Barakatuhumul Aliya)
- Students: 251
- Location: Buffalo, New York, United States
- Website: www.madania.org

Darul Uloom Al-Madania is a private Islamic madrasah in Buffalo, New York and the largest Deobandi madrasa in North America. It trains Islamic scholars (ulama) and huffaz with academic study up to high school. It is one of the oldest institutions in North America to offer the traditional Deobandi dars-e-nizami curriculum.

It was founded by Muhammad Ismail Memon (d. 2023) and is run by his sons Mansoor Memon, Ibrahim Memon, and Husain Ahmad Memon. Masood Memon Makki, the grandson of the school's founder, serves as the current president. The founder was a student of renowned 20th-century Hadith scholar Zakariyya Kandhlawi.

== History ==
Darul Uloom Al-Madania was founded by Ismail Memon. The search for a suitable building that would serve as an institution began in 1986, when Ismail Memon and Shaikh Ibrahim were living in Waterloo, Canada. In 1989, the two prepared to purchase a property in Dunkirk, New York, only to have it rejected. One year later in 1990, they again prepared to purchase a property on Dodge Street in Buffalo, New York. Once again this sale was rejected. On June 17, 1991, a property was obtained on North Davis Road in East Aurora, New York. However, a permit was only obtained to house 18 people. In 1992, a contract was signed for a property in Hamburg, New York. However, the sale was cancelled due to local opposition. Later that year, another property was obtained on Sycamore Street in downtown Buffalo, only to have the sale cancelled by the owners.

In 1993, Holy Mother of the Rosary Cathedral of the Polish National Catholic Church, relocated to Lancaster and was purchased and converted into a mosque and boarding school. On March 3, the church across from the newly formed Masjid Zakariya, Queen of the Most Holy Rosary, was also purchased and converted into a women's school. In 1996, the original property on Sycamore Street was obtained again and this time the purchase was complete. The new building was turned into the Jamia, or the boys' boarding school. The original building purchased for the boarding school then became the Darul Khalil secular studies school. In 2002, a 6-acre (24,000 m^{2}) plot, previously used as a youth detention center, was purchased and the Jamiah was moved there.

== Schools ==
Darul Uloom Madania has three different schools: Madinatul Uloom, Darul Rasheed, and Darul Khalil Academy, a K–8 standard private school, which is recognized by New York State. In addition there is an online distance learning course called eAlim, which was launched in 2010.

=== Boys' School (Madinatul Uloom) ===
Darul-Uloom Al-Madania Boys' campus covers an area of approximately six acres consisting of sixteen buildings with hundreds of dorm rooms. Every room is furnished with beds. The school offers three Islamic degrees for men:

- Regular Academic Education: For boys nine years and older, there is an in-house academic education up to the eleventh grade. This course runs simultaneously with one of the following religious programs:
- Hifz Course: An approximately three-year program for the complete memorization of the Qur'an, along with an accredited State of New York approved curriculum for secular studies from the fourth to the tenth grade. Upon completing the program, students receive a Hafiz Al-Qur'an certificate.
- Alim Course: A six-year, in-depth study of the Qur'an, Tafseer, Hadith, Fiqh, Arabic Grammar, and Tajweed. Completion of this course leads to a certificate of Islamic scholarship.

The boys' campus includes and indoor gymnasium, outdoor soccer/football field, fully equipped kitchen and cafeteria, field with gazebo, school bookstore, and an orchard.

=== Girls School (Darul Rasheed) ===
Darul-Uloom Al-Madania Girls' campus covers approximately one acre of land which is separated from the boys' school and is located on another street. The main residence building, Darul-Rasheed, houses more than 100 students. There are two degrees that are offered for women.

- Regular Academic Education: There is an in-house academic education set up till the tenth grade. This runs simultaneously with the main Alimah course.
- Alimah Course: A six-year, in-depth study of the Qur'an, Tafseer, Hadith, Fiqh and Tajweed leading to a certificate of Islamic scholarship.

The women's campus includes an indoor hall, a fully equipped kitchen and cafeteria, gym, an outdoor recreational field, and a boarding hall.

The Darul Rasheed is located in the former Queen of the Most Holy Rosary Roman Catholic Church, which was built in 1916 and was closed by the Roman Catholic Diocese of Buffalo in 1993.

=== Day School (Darul Uloom Academy) ===
Darul-Uloom Academy is the most recent addition to Darul Uloom Madania, being established in 1999. It is a New York Board certified pre K–5 private school. Like most private Islamic schools, students are taught a combination of both academics, and religious material. Included in the syllabus are math, English, social studies, science as well as Arabic, Quran, and Hadith. Students are also offered a variety of activities including arts and crafts, physical education, and field trips. The program has around 250 students.

=== Masjid Zakariya ===
Masjid Zakariya is the main prayer hall of the seminary and is open to the public. Its supports two minarets donned with two crescents. These crescents are approximately 160 ft above ground and are almost 6 feet in length. The mosque is 20,000 square feet with a balcony section separate for women.

Adhering to the tenets of Islam, the mosque has 5 daily prayers and a weekly Jum'ah prayer. Every day there are 2–3 halaqas, where readings from various Islamic textbooks occur. During Ramadan, the mosque also hosts daily Iftar and Suhoor meals for those that are fasting. It also opens its left wing to travelers for itikaf. There is no appointed Imam of the masjid, instead, various resident scholars and teachers lead the prayers.

The Masjid Zakariya was built in 1904 as the Holy Mother of the Rosary Polish National Catholic Cathedral, and is a designated city landmark.

==== Damage ====
On October 22, 2001, a fire caused by a plumber's torch engulfed the building, which was undergoing construction. Despite the efforts of nearly 80 firefighters, the roof collapsed. It took almost three years to raise the 1 million dollars needed to renovate the building. The mosque also offered an open house around the same time to showcase itself to the community. Renovations included adding a basement and dividing the main hall into three sections. The building was initially graced with two tall spires, which were removed in 2008 after a strong windstorm damaged them. They were replaced with two domes.

== Jalsa Ceremony ==
Every year, Darul Uloom Al Madania holds a Jalsa Graduation Ceremony for all the graduating huffaz and ulama (girls) . The ceremony usually takes places in June and happens after the Dhuhr prayer and lasts until sundown. During the ceremony, the new huffaz are presented with a white turban placed on their heads, whilst the girls are presented with a white shawl.

== eAlim (Distance Learning Program) ==
Darul Uloom Al Madania launched a distance learning program called eAlim in mid 2010. Similar to the Alim course, it was program that was designed to orient the student with Arabic and Quran. The subjects taught included Arabic grammar, syntax, and morphology, Fiqh (Islamic Jurisprudence), Hadith, Uloom al-Hadith (Sciences of Hadith), Aqidah (Islamic Theology), and Seerah (Biography of the Prophet Muhammad).

== Sexual abuse and corruption allegations ==
=== Physical abuse ===
A former student alleges that a custodian punched him in the chest after an infraction. Mansoor Memon hit him with a hockey stick after this student complained.

=== Sexual abuse ===
==== Ibrahim Memon 2007 sex scandal ====
Ibrahim, then a 40-year-old married father of seven, persuaded one of the female students at the school Sajida Khan, then-21, to secretly marry him for sex. Ibrahim proposed to her secretly during Khan's last year at the school in a locked basement. He schemed to meet her secretly in Buffalo and in Virginia, where Ibrahim paid for a short-term apartment for her. Ibrahim denies they were ever married.

He was also accused of maintaining the same relationship with another one of his former students, who has alleged that he groomed her. Ibrahim secretly married her as well, though she now believes that marriage never happened. When she told her father, he removed her from the school.

==== Child Victims Act Lawsuits 2021 ====
A former student, Abdullah Islamovic, living in Canada filed a lawsuit against Darul-Uloom Madania for not doing enough to protect him from sexual abuse in the 1990s and early 2000s. He alleges that between the ages of 11 and 13, he was sexually abused by a teacher at the school, who was also the head of the boys' dormitory.

== See also ==
- Darul Uloom
- Darul Uloom Bury
- Darul Uloom London
- Darul Uloom Deoband
- Al-Rashid Islamic Institute
