= Darul Uloom Banskandi =

Islamic seminary located in the Cachar district of Assam

- دارالعلوم بانسکنڈی
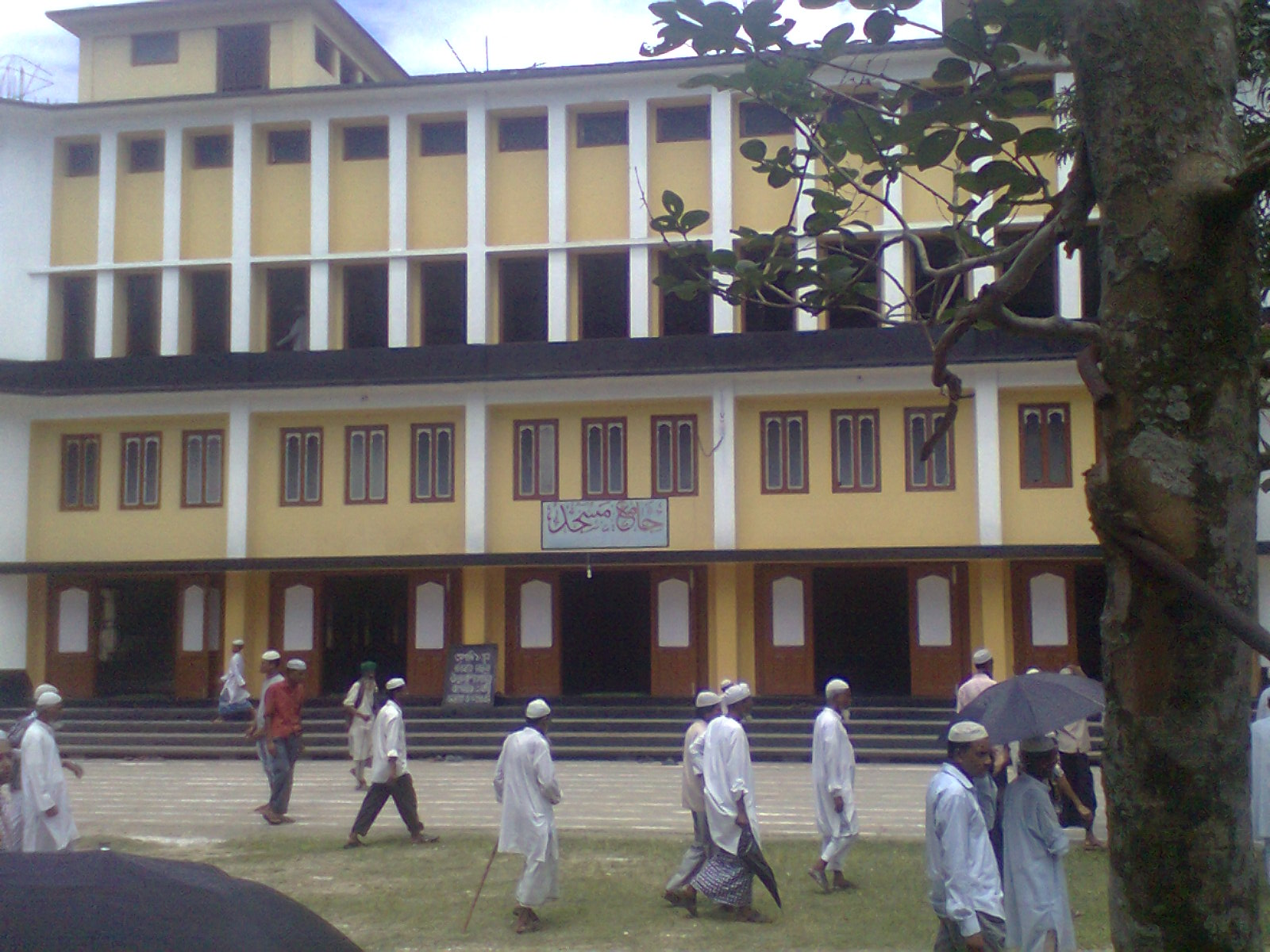
- The mosque of Darul Uloom Banskandi in 2013
- Other names: Banskandi Madrasa
- Type: Darul uloom
- Established: 1897; 129 years ago
- Founders: Hafiz Akbar Ali, disciple of Imdadullah Muhajir Makki
- Religious affiliation: Islam
- Principal: Muhammad Yahya
- Students: c. 1200
- Location: Banskandi, Cachar District, Assam, 788101; 24.4836°N 92.5454°E
- Campus: 9 acres (3.6 ha)

Darul Uloom Banskandi (Bengali: দারুল উলূম বাঁশকান্দি, Meitei: ꯗꯥꯔꯨꯂ ꯎꯂꯨꯃ ꯕꯥꯪꯁꯀꯥꯟꯗꯤ) is an Islamic seminary located in the Cachar district of Assam. It is the largest Islamic university in North-East India and extremely follows the methodology of Darul Uloom Deoband.

== History ==
The institution was founded by Hafiz Akbar Ali, who was a Manipuri Muslim and a disciple of Imdadullah Muhajir Makki. He spent three years with him in Makka after taking the oath of allegiance (bay'ah) at his holy hand. One day, Makki instructed him to return to his homeland and to involve himself in Islamic education by establishing a madrassa institution. He then returned to Banskandi and founded the Banskandi Madrasa in 1897. His main co-operator was Nena Miyan, who gifted his land to the institution.

Later, Hussain Ahmad Madani wished to make Banskandi Madrasa a second Darul Uloom in India and a center of Islamic education. So he appointed Ahmad Ali Badarpuri to the post of Shaykhul Hadith. He spent there the last two Ramadans of his life and inaugurated the Prophetic Tradition (Hadith) in 1957. He also predicted that the rising light of education from the Banskandi madrasa would shine on the world very soon. The basic condition of the madrassa was very poor. It had only a small mosque and three cottages. But under the patronage of Ahmad Ali Badarpuri, the institution turned into an Islamic university within a very short period of time.

=== Contributions ===
The Deobandi scholars and their madrassas played a prominent and sterling role in the freedom struggle. They aimed at expelling the British and advocated for a united country in opposition to the partition of India. Banskandi Madrassa is not an exception to this.

Darul Uloom Banskandi has produced many great Islamic scholars, Hafizs, writers, leaders, intellectuals, and social reformers.

Darul Uloom Banskandi is called the "Shantiniketan" (abode of peace) of Northeast India.

== Reputation and Academics ==
Modeled after the prestigious Darul Uloom Deoband, this institution, with a large number of faculty, provides quality education to thousands of students every year. It has gained widespread reputation through Ahmad Ali Badarpuri. Ulamas produced from here render services in different places, including Deoband, in addition to the North-Eastern Region.

The seminary offers the following courses:

- Tajwīd and Qira'at
- Hifz (Memorization of the Quran)
- Aālimiyyat ('Alim course)
- Ifta (Mufti course)
- Daura-e Tafsir (Explanation of Quran)
- Takmīl-e-Adab (Arabic literature)
- A short 'ālim course
- Jild Sāzi (bookbinding)

== Administration ==
Since the beginning of the institution, a number of Ulamas, such as Haji Miyadhan, Khalilur Rahman, Tayyib Ahmad Qasmi, and others, have served as its head and principal. Ahmad Ali Badarpuri was just like the director general of the institution, although he formally never held the post of principal. He controlled all sides remaining in the rank of Shaykh al-Hadith. He was the maker and the main patron of the seminary. Qari Muhammad Tayyib, the former vice chancellor of Darul Uloom Deoband, has called him the second founder of Darul Uloom Banskandi.

Muhammad Yahya is the current principal of the institution.

== Notable alumni ==
- Abdur Rashid (Lanka), General Secretary of Assam state Jamiat Ulama e Hind (A)
- Abdul Haque, Hadith professor of Jamia Jalalia, Hojai
- Muzammil Ali Assami, Rector of Jamiatush Shaikh Hussain Ahmad Al-Madani, Khanqah, Deoband
- Hafiz Alauddin, former vice principal of the institution
- Ibrahim Khalil, Shaykh al-Hadith of Buraburi Madrasa, Morigaon
- Muhammad Yahya, current principal, and Shaykh al-Hadith of the institution
- Abdul Qadir, General Secretary, Asam State Jamiat Ulama e Hind (M)
