= Madinatul Uloom Al Islamiya =

- Kidderminster, England DY10 4BS

Information
- Other name: MTU
- School type: Residential
- Religious affiliation: Islam
- Opened: 1992
- Founder: Moulana Yusuf Motala

Madinatul Uloom Al Islamiya (MTU) is an Islamic boarding college in the county of Worcestershire near Kidderminster, England. It was one of the first Islamic seminaries for boys after Darul Uloom Bury, both of which were founded by the late scholar Yusuf Motala. The site was originally founded as a girls boarding college in 1987 (currently Jaamiatul Imaam Muhammad Zakaria based in Bradford) and then refounded as a boys college in 1992.

Madinatul Uloom teaches students aged from 11 to 18 in the school section and has boarding and higher education facilities for adult learners of all ages.

In 2015 the school began the construction of a new hall, which has now been completed and is utilised for lectures, exams, prayer services and recreational activities. This hall also accommodates guests who come to attend the joint annual graduation ceremony for graduates from Madinatul Uloom and Darul Uloom Bury.

== Syllabus ==
The madrasah specialises in offering two main routes of educational pathways in conjunction with the UK school syllabus which are the Hifz programme and the Alimiyyah programme (based on the dars nizami syllabus).

The Alimiyyah programme is an intensive six-year course which specialises in an in-depth study of many subjects such as Islamic Tafsir, Hadith, Fiqh, Jurisprudence, Philosophy, History, Theology, Classical Arabic and Quran.

== Notable lecturers and alumni ==
- Abu Yusuf Riyadh ul Haq
