= Faculty of Dar Al-Uloom, Cairo University =

Since 1872, a university in Cairo, Egypt

Faculty of Dar al-Uloom, Cairo University
- كلية دار العلوم
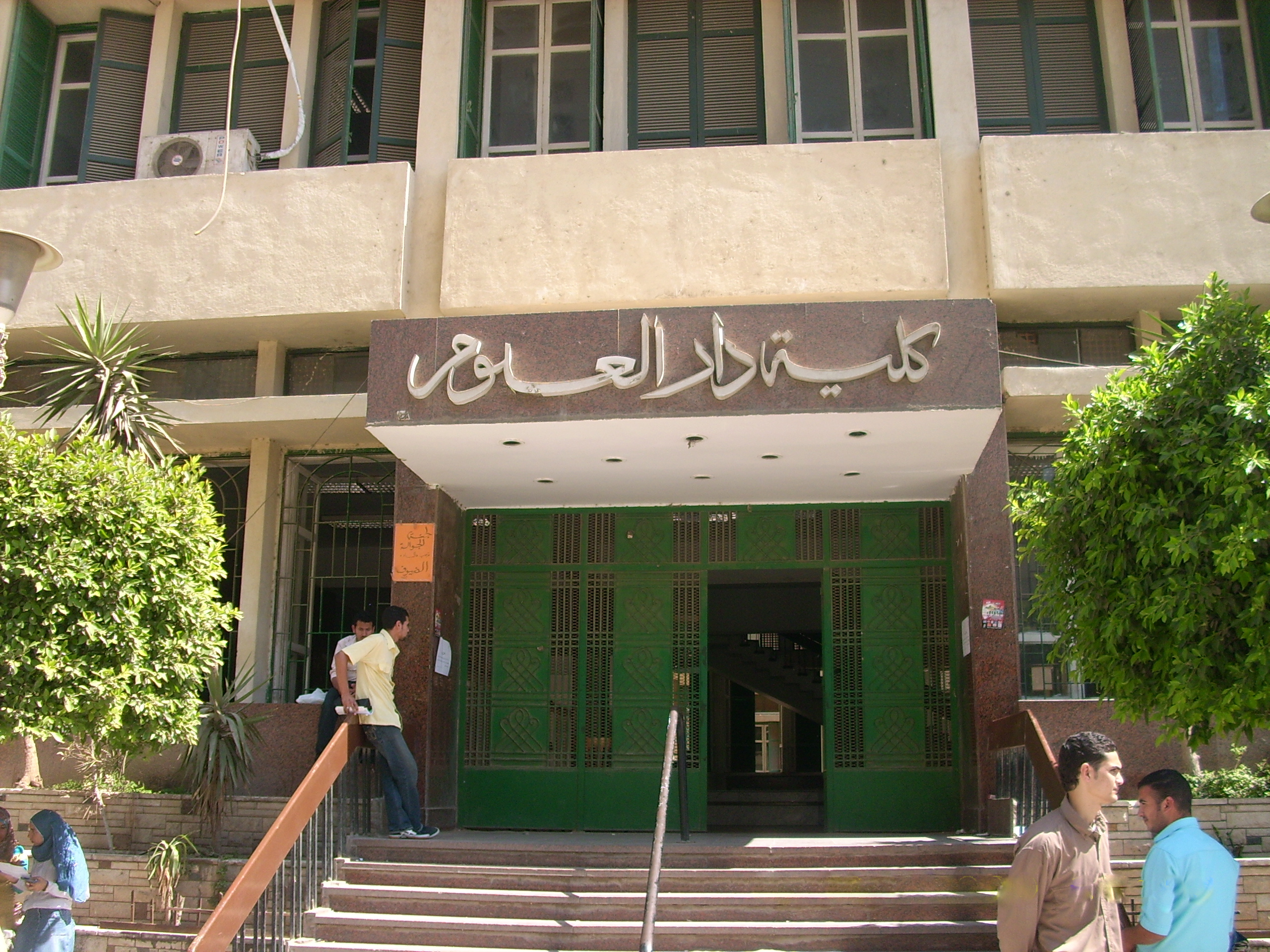
- Type: Public
- Established: 1872; 154 years ago
- Affiliations: UNIMED
- President: Ahmed Mohamed Balboula
- Location: Cairo University, Egypt; 30.02760°N 31.21014°E
- Campus: Urban
- Website: www.darelom.cu.edu.eg

Dar al-Uloom (Arabic: دار العلوم, romanized: Dār al-ʿUlūm, lit. 'House of Sciences') is an educational institution designed to produce students with both an Islamic and modern secondary education. It was founded in 1871 and since 1946 it has been incorporated as a faculty of Cairo University, being now commonly called Faculty of Dar al-Uloom (كلية دار العلوم, Kulliyyat Dār al-ʿUlūm).

The Faculty has 6 majors (B.A., M.A. and Ph.D.) in Islamic studies, Arabic language, and philosophy. Most of graduates work as teachers after getting required diploma from Faculty of Education.

== Notable alumni ==
- Hassan al-Banna (1906-1949): Egyptian Islamic theorist and politician.
- Farouk Shousha (1936-2016): Egyptian poet and writer.
- Abdul Azim al-Deeb (1929-2010): Egyptian Islamic scholar.
- Sayyid Qutb (1906-1966): Egyptian author, educator, Islamic theorist, poet, and a leading member of the Egyptian Muslim Brotherhood in the 1950s and 1960s.
- Muhammad Al-Labani (born 1970): Egyptian author, poet, and researcher.

== See also ==
- Darul uloom (disambiguation)
