= Banskandi =

- Village
- Location in Assam, India Banskandi (India)
- Coordinates: 24°48′0″N 92°54′0″E
- Country: India
- State: Assam
- District: Cachar

Government
  - Body: Gram panchayat
- Elevation: 23 m (75 ft)

Languages
  - Official: Bengali and Meitei (Manipuri)
- Time zone: UTC+5:30 (IST)
- Vehicle registration: AS
- Coastline: 0 kilometres (0 mi)

Banskandi is a Block level area in Cachar district, Assam, India, almost 13 km from Silchar.

== Geography ==
Banskandi is located at an elevation of 23 meters above sea level.

== Location ==
National Highway 53, now, National Highway 37 passes through Banskandi.

== Languages and peoples ==
Bengali and Meitei (Manipuri) are the official languages of this place.

The village is composed mainly of Bengalis and Meiteis, and the Bengali language is the most common language in the region. Hindi speakers are very few.

== Schools and institutes ==
Schools and institutes in the village include:

1. Darul Uloom Banskandi (Islamic seminary)
2. Banskandi Nena Meah Higher Secondary School
3. MD English School
4. Pioneer English school
5. Banskandi Junior College
6. Barak Valley Secondary School
7. N.I.M public school
8. Moulana Ahmed Ali Degree college
