= Aishah Siddiqah Islamic Institute =

Location
- Bowmanville, Ontario; Canada
- Coordinates: 43.92707°N 78.66738°W

Information
- Type: Madrasah
- Principal: Dr. Muhammad Saeed
- Staff: 25
- Enrollment: 600
- Campus type: Urban (105 Acres)
- Website: www.alimahprogram.org

The Jamiah Aishah Siddiqah Islamic Institute was located in Bowmanville, Ontario, Canada. It was an Islamic School for Muslim girls. Located on a 105-acre campus, the institute also offered full-time secular education until 12th grade which was accredited by the Ontario Ministry of Education.

== Education pattern ==
The following courses were offered to the students:

- Tajweed and Qirat (Mastery over Quranic Recitation)
- Arabic Nahw (Grammar)
- Arabic Sarf (Morphology)
- Arabic Adab (Literature)
- Arabic Balaghah (Rhetoric)
- Mantiq (Logical, Rational, Deductive and Rhetorical Analytical Methods)
- Aqeedah (Islamic Doctrine and Theology)
- Usul al Fiqh (Principles of Islamic Jurisprudence)
- Fiqh (Jurisprudence)
- Usul al Hadeeth (Principles of Hadeeth Interpretation)
- Hadeeth (Prophetic Traditions)
- Usul al Tafsir (Principles of Exegesis of the Qur'an)
- Tafsir al Quran al Kareem (Exegesis of the Quran)
- Seerah (Biography of Muhammad)
- Meerath (Islamic inheritance)
- Islamic History
- Journalism
- Sociology
- Arabic calligraphy
- Memorization of Select Surahs/Chapters
