= Darul Uloom Pretoria =

Islamic university in South Africa

Darul Uloom Pretoria دارالعلوم پریٹوریا
- Type: Islamic university
- Established: 1988
- Founder: Mufti Muhammed Akbar Hazarvi
- Affiliations: Al-Azhar University; Jamia Rizwia Zia Ul Uloom
- Religious affiliation: Sunni Islam (Hanafi Barelvi)
- Principal: Mufti Muhammed Akbar Hazarvi
- Location: Taj St, Laudium, Centurion, 0037,, Pretoria, South Africa
- Language: English, Arabic, Urdu
- Website: http://darululoompretoria.com/

Darul Uloom Pretoria (Urdu: دارالعلوم پریٹوریا) is an Islamic university and seminary located in Pretoria, South Africa following the ideologies of Ahmed Raza Khan Barelvi. It is regarded as the first fully-fledged Barelvi Madrassah in South Africa. It was opened and founded in 1988 by Mufti Muhammed Akbar Hazarvi in the context of the Barelvi-Deobandi/Tablighi controversy and emergence of religious revivalist movements/organisations in South Africa in the 1970s and 1980s. Hence, Darul Uloom Pretoria was set up as a means of defending and preserving Sufi-Barelvi beliefs and practices among South Africa's Muslim community, and counter the influence of the Deobandi Movement, which attacks certain Sufi practices including Mawlid.

The Darul Uloom, like many Barelvi orientated Madrassahs in South Africa, received funding from local Indian Muslim businessmen and donors of the Barelvi persuasion, and many of the teachers in the Darul Uloom are educated in Madrassas in India and Pakistan. The institute have published a variety of Islamic literature, including an English translation of Ahmad Raza Khan's Urdu translation of the Qur'an, Kanzul Iman. The institute has links with Al-Azhar University in Egypt and Jamia Rizwia Zia Ul Uloom located in Rawalpindi, Pakistan and has connections with Ulama from across the world. The Darul Uloom has full time courses, part time courses, and female courses and runs a seven year Alim programme, a three-year Imamat course as well as a Ḥifẓ, elementary education, and secular education that is incorporated with the full time course in particular.

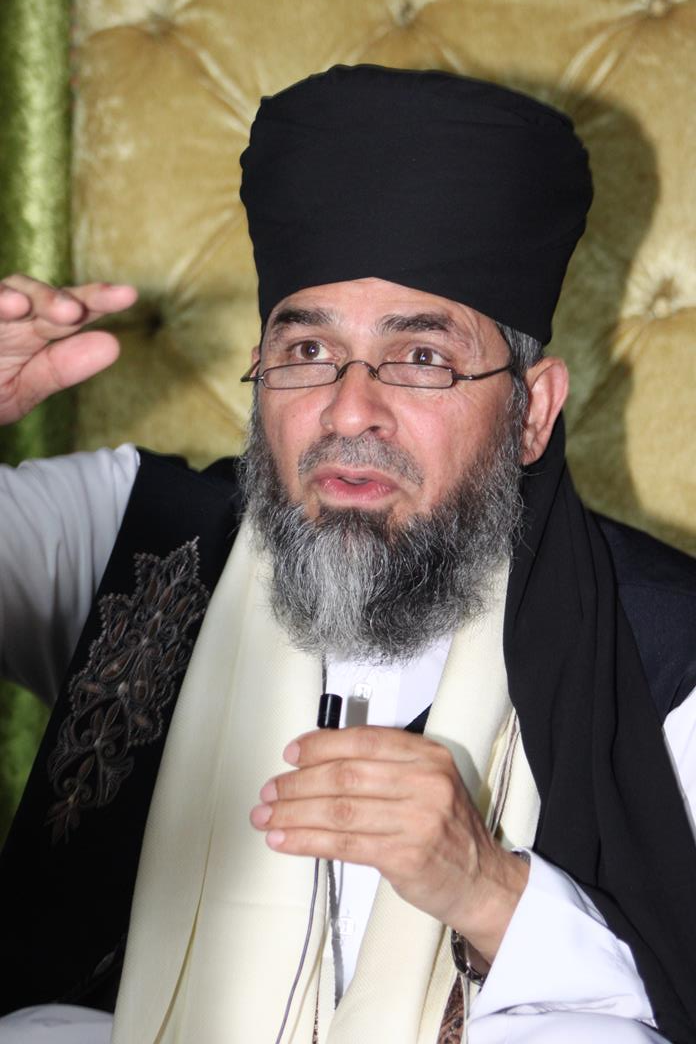
Muhammed Akbar Hazarvi, founder and principle of the Darul Uloom
