= Yusuf Motala =

British Indian scholar (1946 - 2019)

Shaykh al-Hadith Maulana Yusuf Motala
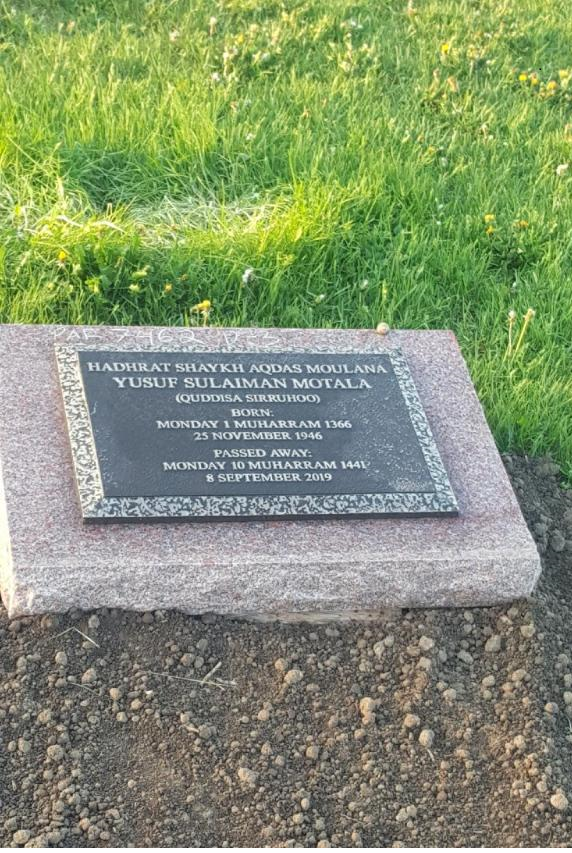
- Gravestone of Shaykh Yusuf Motala

Personal life
- Born: 25 November 1946 Nani Naroli, Surat district, India
- Died: 9 September 2019 (aged 72) Mississauga, Canada
- Resting place: Woodbridge, Canada
- Education: Mazahir Uloom, Saharanpur

Religious life
- Religion: Islam
- Denomination: Sunni
- Founder of: Darul Uloom Bury , Markazul Uloom / Noorul Uloom
- Jurisprudence: Hanafi
- Movement: Deobandi (Tablighi Jamaat)

Muslim leader
- Teacher: Zakariyya Kandhlawi; Yunus Jaunpuri
- Students: Riyadh ul Haq Muhammad Al-Kawthari Abdur Rahman Mangera
- Influenced: Tariq Jamil
- Arabic name
- Personal (Ism): Yūsuf يوسف
- Patronymic (Nasab): ibn Sulaymān ibn Qāsim Mutālā بن سليمان بن قاسم متالا
- Toponymic (Nisba): as-Sūrtī السورتي

Yusuf ibn Suleman ibn Qasim Motala (25 November 1946 – 8 September 2019) was a British Indian Sunni Muslim scholar, founder of Darul Uloom Bury and one of the disciples of Zakariyya Kandhlawi.

== Early life and education ==
Yusuf Motala was born in Nani Naroli in Gujarat, British India, on 25 November 1946. He graduated from Mazahir Uloom, where he studied under Muhammad Zakariyya Kandhlawi and Muhammad Yunus Jaunpuri.

== Career ==
Upon the instruction of Zakariyya Kandhlawi, Maulana Yusuf Motala established Darul Uloom Al-Arabiyyah Al-Islamiyyah in Holcombe, Bury, Lancashire, in 1973. He subsequently established several other educational institutes. He was included in the 2019 list of "The 500 Most Influential Muslims," published annually by the Royal Islamic Strategic Studies Centre.

== Death ==
He died in Toronto, Canada on 8 September 2019 following a heart attack.

== Works ==
Motala's works are:

- Aḍwā' al-Bayān fī Tarjamatul Qurʼān (Urdu translation of the Quran).
- Aimma Araba aur Sufia Kiram (Urdu)
- Juz' ʿAmma Tafsīr in Arabic (with Urdu and English Tarjumma)
- Arabic Khutbahs
- Hadyah-e-Haramain (Salaatus-Salaam Compilations - Arabic-Urdu)
- Buzurgon ke Wisal Ke Ahwaal (Urdu)
- Fitno se Hifazat ke liye Masnoon Duaaei (Urdu)
- Shaykh al-Ḥadīth, Ḥaḍrat Mawlānā Muḥammad Zakariyya saheb raḥmatullahe alayhe Aur Unke Khulafa Ikraam- Part 2 and Part 3 (Urdu)
- Inayat Naame (Urdu)
- Itaat-e-Rasool (Urdu)
- Jamale Mohammadi Jable Noor Pur (Urdu)
- Jamale Mohammadi darse Bukhari ke Aaine mei - Vol 1 & 2 Combined (Urdu)
- Jamale Muhammadi ki Jalwa Gahen - Vols 1 and 2 (Urdu)
- Jāmiʿ al-Siyar (Urdu)
- Karamat Wa Kamalat-e-Awliya - Volumes 1 and 2 (Urdu)
- Majmua e Darood o Salaam (Urdu)
- Mashaa'ikh Ahmadabad Volumes 1 and 2 (Urdu)
- Mere Bhai Jaan (Urdu)
- Muhabbat Naamay Volumes 1 and 2 (Urdu)
- Sham-o-Hind ke Awliya' ʿIzam (Urdu)

English translations of Shaykh Yusuf Motala's works are:

- Final Moments of the Pious (English Translation)
- Ḥaḍrat Shaykh and I (English)
- Miṣbāḥ al-Ẓalām fi al-Ṣalāt wa al-Salām ʿalā khayr al-Anām, compiled by Imām Nūr al-Dīn Al-Shūni (RA), emphasised by Ḥaḍrat Mawlānā Yūsuf Motālā ṣaheb (English /Arabic)
- 99 Names of Allah (Asmaaul-Husnaa) and 99 Attributes/Appellations of Prophet Muhammad
- The Need for Simple Weddings (English)
