= Ummah Welfare Trust =

- Type: charity
- Purpose: charity and development, Islamic outreach
- Headquarters: United Kingdom
- Region served: Worldwide

The Ummah Welfare Trust (UWT) (also called Amanat Charity Trust) is a UK-based Islamic charity organization that provides relief to impoverished and war-affected communities around the world. In 2022, the organization listed 16 countries in which it operates.

The charity came to prominence in the UK during 2020 when it provided PPE to the nation's health service.
