= Darul Uloom, Birmingham =

Coordinates: 52.4686°N 1.8561°W

Darul Uloom Birmingham
- Birmingham; United Kingdom

Information
- Type: Islamic School
- Established: 1985
- Department for Education URN: 103586 Tables
- Principal: Maulna Dr. Abdur Rahim
- Capacity: 150
- Campus: Birmingham
- Website: http://www.darululoom.org.uk/

The Darul Uloom Birmingham Islamic High School (Arabic: دارالعلوم الاسلامية العربية برمنجهام, Urdu: دارالعلوم برمنگهم) is an Islamic independent high school in Birmingham, England. It was established in 1985 by Jami Masjid and Islamic Centre Birmingham.

== Controversies ==
=== 2011 ===
The school was inspected in May 2011, following a Channel 4 documentary Dispatches illegally filming teaching sessions within the school. Ofsted found that it was "good" with regard to the behaviour of pupils, "satisfactory" with regard to how well the curriculum and other activities met the range of needs and interests of pupils and quality of provision for pupils’ spiritual, moral, social and cultural development, but "inadequate" in overall quality of education, how effective teaching and assessment were in meeting of pupils’ needs, how well pupils made progress in their learning, and the overall welfare, health and safety of pupils.

The report followed the Dispatches documentary, entitled Lessons in Hate and Violence, on 14 February 2011, which filmed undercover inside the school, documenting that many students and teachers were preaching intolerance to other students. Some of the footage showed a preacher making extremely offensive remarks about Hindus and ranting: "Disbelievers are the worst creatures".

The school released an official statement about the programme on its website, sharing their understandable frustration stating that it had been grossly misrepresented and that comments had been taken out of context. Local MP John Hemming made comments supporting the school. The school said it was targeted by hate calls following the broadcast.

The DfE ruled that the Dispatches programme found a "minimal amount of evidence" of intolerance and contempt for other cultures, religions and mainstream society and "a culture of intolerance where adherents to other faiths are despised and considered inferior" despite Muslims respecting all faiths. It said that the school promoted a "wholesale repudiation of mainstream society"; and that the headmaster, deputy headmaster, and religious studies teacher were among the speakers secretly recorded "denigrating or belittling members of other religions" and promoting the view that Muslims must remain separate from mainstream society.

In one lesson, a teacher "appears to be advocating war against America and/or Jews, and to be repudiating democracy";. The headmaster had given lessons "condemning all non-Muslims and all aspects of their behaviour", as well as promoting Islamic punishments, including the chopping of hands for stealing and stoning for adultery, with no reference to a British context, which "may not be enabling pupils to distinguish right from wrong ... and to respect British law. The DfE said the "combined effect of these speeches is to emphasise to the pupils that they should not have any contact with people who belong to other religious groups; indeed contact should be hateful... and to discourage them from living in harmony with members of British society". It also said that a separate Ofsted inspection in the wake of the programme had found "serious regulatory failings".

The DfE strongly backed the editing of the Dispatches programme. It said: "There was no other teaching that DfE saw that presented other religions, cultures or cultural traditions in a positive light. There was no evidence in the footage that was viewed to support the school's contention that its teachings were likely to prepare students to integrate, interact with and contribute beneficially to wider society.

The school has written back to the DfE with an action plan, promising "a significant transformation of the school structure". The school said the headmaster had been replaced by an acting head, and all teachers identified in the film as making "inappropriate comments" had been dismissed. One was imprisoned. The governing body had also been disbanded and all members of its Senior Management Team had been dismissed. It said it was taking a number of other steps to combat extremism and improve community cohesion. The DfE has accepted the action plan, but warned that the school may still be struck off the register for independent schools if it did not adhere to regulatory standards.

=== 2015 ===
In 2015 the school was subject to another critical Ofsted report, this time after further expressions of concern which led to an unannounced inspection. It was found that a female governor sat in a different room to male governors when conducting a governance meeting. The school responded saying it was the stubborn female governor's choice to sit apart, and that segregation was not routinely practiced at the school. Ofsted also reported that the school's "policy states that the biggest timetable weighting has been given to English and mathematics, but inspection evidence and school timetables show that pupils study Arabic for approximately half of the school day." A large number of leaflets were found with highly concerning comments, such as "Music, dancing and singing are acts of devil and prohibited" in areas used by pupils, staff, and the mosque next door. The Darul Uloom Islamic High School said the leaflets - described by Ofsted as evidence of safeguarding weakness - were not found on its premises but at the rear door of an adjacent mosque where they had been 'dumped' by a member of the public.
