= Dar Al Uloom University =

University in Saudi Arabia

- جامعة دار العلوم
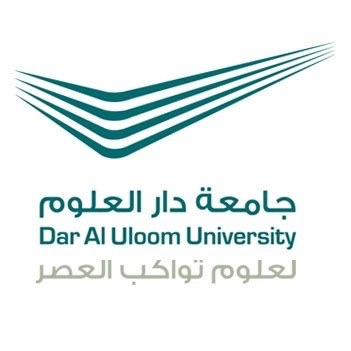
- Type: Private
- Established: 2008; 17 years ago
- Chairman: Abdulaziz bin Ali Al-Tuwaijri
- President: Khalid Alhomoudi
- Administrative staff: >150
- Students: >2500
- Location: Riyadh, Saudi Arabia
- Website: www.dau.edu.sa

Dar Al Uloom University (Arabic: جامعة دار العلوم, romanized: Jāmiʿah Dār al-Uʿlūm; DAU) is a university in Riyadh, Saudi Arabia.

Dar Al Uloom University (DAU) offers a range of programs for Saudi and international students, with academic training and accreditation by the Saudi Ministry of Higher Education.

DAU programs have been designed in collaboration with King Fahd University of Petroleum and Minerals (KFUPM) employing the international standards in compliance with the Saudi Ministry of Higher Education and the National Commission for Academic Accreditation and Assessment (NCAAA), as well as the Accreditation Board for Engineering and Technology (ABET) and the Association to Advance Collegiate Schools of Business (AACSB).

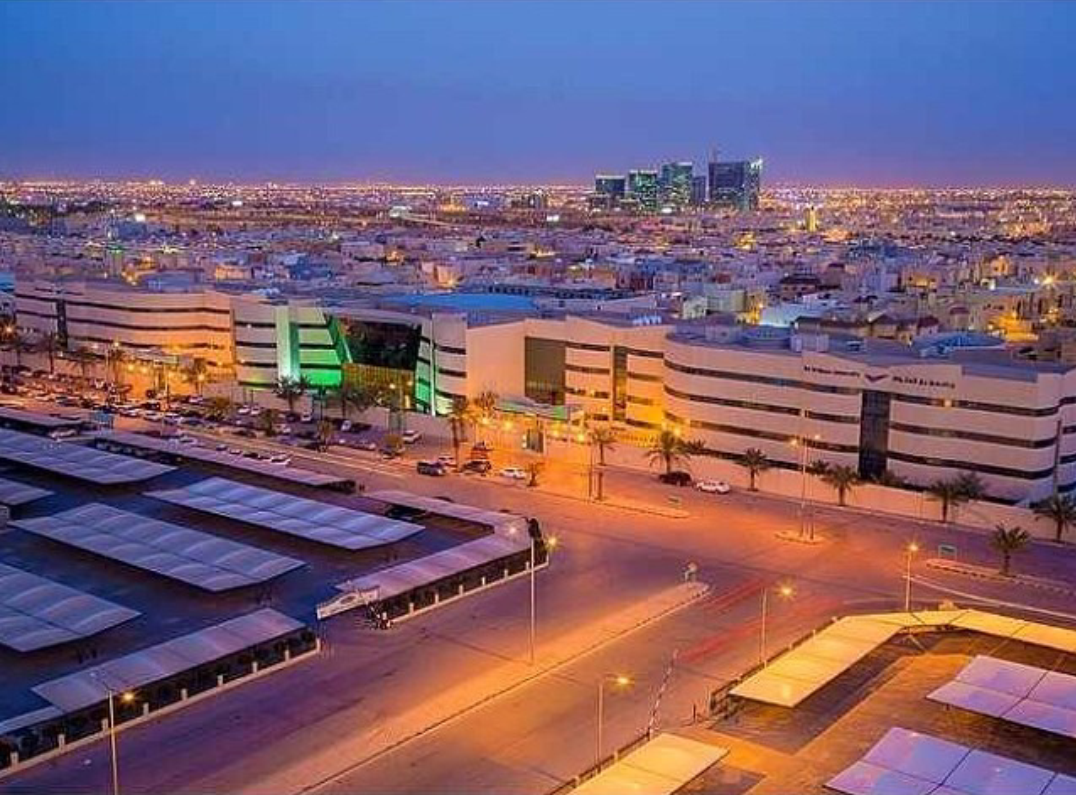
DAU at night

Dar al Uloom University, located in Riyadh, Saudi Arabia is a private university. Initially, it was founded as Dar al Uloom Private College in 2008, and received university status in 2009.

== Academic structure ==
AU comprises six colleges and fifteen major areas of studies:

- College of Medicine. Dar al Uloom college of medicine is a fast growing college with strategic partnerships such as King Saud University and King Fahd Medical City. The college has a large and distinguished faculty to support its missions of education, research, and clinical care.
- Department of Computer Engineering and Information Technology with academic majors in: computer science, software engineering and information technology.
- Department of Business Administration with academic majors in: Marketing, finance and banking, accounting and human resources.
- Department of Architectural Engineering and Digital Design with academic majors in: architectural engineering, interior design, graphic design.
- School of Law with an academic major in law.
- Women's Section of the University (Education). Special education, early education, computers, English language.

== Notable alumni ==
- Nahar The Mask

== See also ==
- List of universities and colleges in Saudi Arabia
