= Darul Uloom Zakariyya =

Madrasa in Lenasia, South Africa

- دار العلوم زكريا
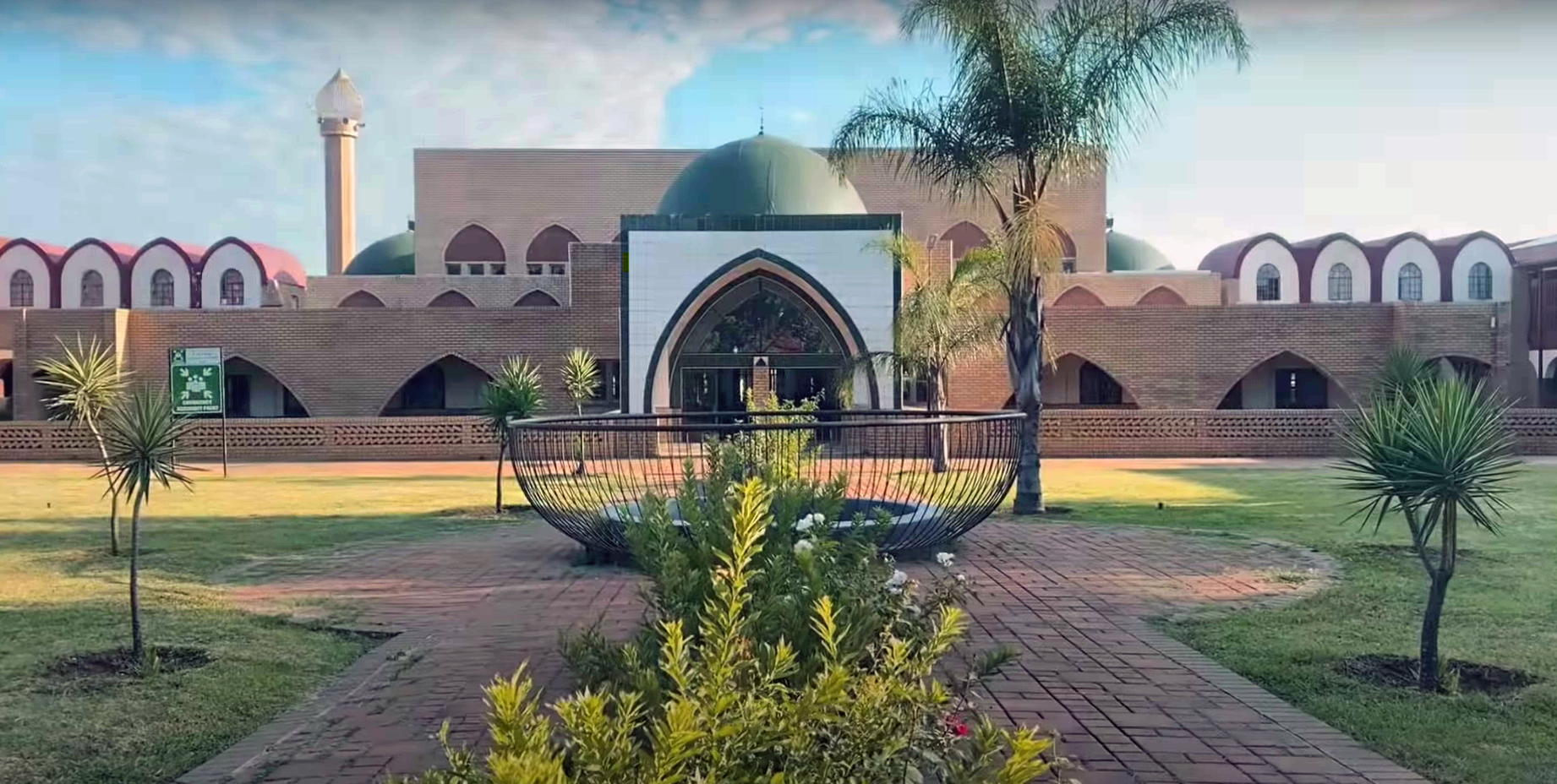
- Type: Darul uloom , university
- Established: 1983
- Religious affiliation: Deobandi Islam
- Principal: Maulana Shabbir Ahmed Saloojee
- Students: 800+
- Location: Stand 52, Golden Highway, Zakariyya Park, 1813 Johannesburg, Gauteng, South Africa, Lenasia, South Africa
- Website: duz.org.za

Darul Uloom Zakariyya (Arabic: دار العلوم زكريا) is a madrasa in Lenasia, South Africa. Opened in 1983 in an agricultural area not far from Johannesburg, it is now surrounded by a suburb which was named in its honor (Zakariyya Park). The institute was initially called Madrasah Zakariyya and was finally changed to Darul Uloom Zakariyya to reflect its true educational purpose as an Institute of higher Islamic learning. Since its inception, the madrasa has expanded and now include a branch in Eikenhof, a locality some 73 km away; catering for the needs of approximately 700 young Hifz learners – and a Maktab in Mandane, Soweto. The madrasa has produced a wide range of exemplary alumni and community leaders.

== Faculty of Studies ==
The Darul Uloom Zakariyya has six faculties of study and is based on the Dars-e-Nizami syllabus found throughout many Darul ulooms:

- Hifdhul-Qur'an – The Memorization of the Qur'an al-Kareem.
- Aalimiyah – Study of Islamic Jurisprudence and Sciences. The full course will take around seven years and traditionally the title Maulana will be conferred upon successful graduant.
- Tajweed and Qira’aat – Science of Qur'anic Phonetics and Renditions (Qira'aat Sab'aah and 'Asharah): This was initiated in 1988.
- Iftaa course – Specialization in the Science of Islamic Jurisprudence and Research. A successful completion led to a student being conferred the title Mufti. It has been active since 1987 under the supervision of Mufti Radha al-Haqq. A formal Darul Iftaa was then established in 1992.
- Arabic Adab – Specialization in Arabic Literature.
- Secular education - From grade nine to matriculation with two subjects (English & Maths) being introduced in the first year.

== Notable alumni ==
- Ustaz Abdul Latif bin Ahmad Subki
- Mufti Mohammed Wasim Khan
- Mufti Abdur Rahman ibn Yusuf Mangera
- Maulana Moavia Azam Tariq
- Imam Mohammad Yasir Khan

== See also ==
- Deobandi movement in South Africa
- List of Deobandi madrasas
