= Darul Uloom Bury =

Madrasa in the UK

Coordinates: 53.638°N 2.335°W

Darul Uloom Al Arabiya Al Islamiya
- Type: Darul uloom
- Established: 16 October 1979
- Founders: Yusuf Motala, Hashim Patel
- Religious affiliation: Deobandi Sunni Islam
- Principal: Mutiullah Khan and Ahmed Hans
- Faculty: 61 (Total)
- Students: 373
- Location: Holcombe, Bury, Greater Manchester, England

Darul Uloom Al Arabiya Al Islamiyya, better known as Darul Uloom Bury, was established in 1979 and is the oldest Islamic seminary in the United Kingdom. Located in Holcombe, Bury, it is based on the Dars-e-Nizami syllabus found throughout the world. It was founded by the late Hadhrat Moulana Yusuf Motala.

== Programme ==
It accepts students from the age of 11 to 23, providing a secondary school education for younger students as well as Islamic education to an advanced level.

== See also ==
- Darul Uloom Al-Madania
- Darul Uloom London
- Darul Uloom Zakariyya
- Madinatul Uloom Al Islamiya
- Mazahirul Uloom Saharanpur
