= Darul Uloom London =

Deobandi Muslim independent boarding school in Chislehurst, Greater London

Location
- Foxbury Avenue; Chislehurst, Greater London, BR7 6SD; England; 51.4165°N 0.0816°E

Information
- Type: Private boarding school
- Religious affiliation: Islam
- Established: 1988
- Local authority: London Borough of Bromley
- Department for Education URN: 101695 Tables
- Ofsted: Reports
- Gender: Boys
- Age range: 11–18
- Enrolment: 159 (2018)
- Capacity: 155
- Campus size: 10 acres (4.0 ha)
- Campus type: Urban
- Website: www.darululoomlondon.co.uk

Darul Uloom London is a boys, Islamic, private boarding school and sixth form in Chislehurst, Greater London, England. It is a Darul Uloom that was established in 1988.

All pupils are boarders and they have two weekend home trips per month, and parents often visit on other weekends.

== Inspection ==
The school was inspected by Ofsted in February 2025 and judged to require improvement because not all subjects are well-taught and because the curriculum at sixth form is too narrow. The standards for independent schools for quality of education and quality of leadership were not met. An additional inspection in November 2025 found the same. As of 2026, this is the most recent inspection.
