= Dars-i Nizami =

Traditional curriculum in Islamic institutions

Dars-i Nizami (Urdu: درس نظامی) is a study curriculum or system used in many Islamic institutions (madrassas) and Darul Ulooms, which originated in the Indian subcontinent in the 18th century and can now also be found in parts of South Africa, Canada, the US, the Caribbean, and the UK.

The Dars-i Nizami system was developed by Nizamuddin Sihalivi (1161 AH/1748 CE) from the Firangi Mahal Ulama (Islamic scholars) group, after whom the Dars-i Nizami were named (Robinson, 2001: p. 72). Sihali is a village in Fatehpur Block in Barabanki District of Uttar Pradesh State, India.

The curriculum included works from a wide range of scholars beyond his own Hanafi background. The selection featured texts by Shafi'i, Maliki, and even Shia scholars, such as Jalal al-Din al-Mahalli, Jalal al-Din al-Suyuti, Nasir al-Din al-Baydawi, Wali al-Din al-'Iraqi, Ibn Hajib, Sadr al-Din Shirazi, Baha al-Din al-Amili, and Nasir al-Din al-Tusi. While Hanafi works like Hidayah and Sharh Wiqayah were also included.

== See also ==
- Darul Uloom
- Madrasa
