= Abul Hasan Azami =

Indian Qur'anic reciter and writer (b. 1941)

Shaykh al-Qurrā', Mawlānā, Qāri Abul Hasan Azami

Personal life
- Born: 1941 (age 84–85) Jagdishpur, Azamgarh district, British India
- Era: 20th–21st century
- Main interest(s): Tajwīd, Qirā'āt, history of Qur'anic recitation
- Notable work(s): al-Nafhah al-‘Anbariyyah sharh al-Muqaddimah al-Jazariyyah, al-Nafahāt al-Qāsimiyyah sharh al-Shāṭibiyyah, Husn al-Muḥāḍarāt fī Rijāl al-Qirā'āt
- Education: Darul Uloom Deoband
- Known for: Teaching and scholarship in tajwīd and qirā'āt
- Occupation: Islamic scholar, Qāri, author

Religious life
- Religion: Islam
- Denomination: Sunni
- Movement: Deobandi

Muslim leader
- Disciple of: Abrarul Haq Haqqi
- Influenced by: Sharif Hasan Deobandi, Muhammad Tayyib Qasmi, Mahmood Hasan Gangohi, Naseer Ahmad Khan, Mirajul Haq Deobandi, Fakhrul Hasan Moradabadi, Wahiduzzaman Kairanawi, Nizamuddin Azami, Muhammad Salim Qasmi, Anzar Shah Kashmiri, Qamaruddin Ahmad Gorakhpuri, Saeed Ahmad Palanpuri, Abdul Khaliq Madrasi, Muhammad Zakariyya Kandhlawi, Abd al-Fattah Abu Ghudda
- Influenced: Thousands of students in India and abroad

Abul Hasan Azami (born 1941), also written as Abul Hasan Azmi, is an Indian Islamic scholar, qāri (Qur'anic reciter) and author known for his work on tajwīd and qirā'āt. Over a career spanning five decades, he taught at several religious institutions and served as head of the Department of Tajwīd and Qirā'āt at Darul Uloom Deoband. He has written extensively on Qur'anic recitation and its history, including works such as al-Nafhah al-‘Anbariyyah, al-Nafahāt al-Qāsimiyyah and Tārīkh ʿIlm al-Qirā'āt. Azami is also associated with the Muslim World League's subsidiary body al-Hay’ah al-‘Ālamiyyah li-Ḥifẓ al-Qur'ān al-Karīm in Mecca.

== Early life and education ==
Abul Hasan Azami was born in 1360 AH (1941 CE) in Jagdishpur, Azamgarh district. His father, Muhammad Hanif, was a memorizer of the Qur'an (ḥāfiẓ).

He received his early education at a madrasa in Jagdishpur, and his father played the major role in his memorization of the Qur'an. He then studied the Qur'anic curriculum and Persian, and progressed from elementary Arabic through to the third level of Arabic at Madrasa Baitul Uloom, Sarai Mir, Azamgarh; during this period he also studied books of tajwīd. After Sarai Mir he enrolled at Darul Uloom Mau where he continued Arabic studies from the fourth to the fifth levels and completed instruction in the qirā'āt al-sab‘ah.

Due to family circumstances he married during his second year of Arabic study, which caused an interruption in his studies; eventually, in Shawwāl 1383 AH (1963 CE) he became a teacher of tajwīd and qirā'āt at Madrasa Ma‘rufiyyah in Pura Ma‘ruf, Mau district and remained there until 1385 AH (1965 CE). During his time at Pura Maroof he also practiced calligraphy under Muhammad Usman Maroofi. He later served as a tajwīd and qirā'āt teacher at Madrasa Karamatiyah Dārul Faiz, Jalalpur until 1388 AH (1968 CE). He then briefly taught at Madrasa Ihyaul Uloom, Mubarakpur until 1390 AH. From 1391 AH (1971 CE) to 1394 AH (1974 CE) he taught tajwīd and qirā'āt at Madrasa Qur'ania in Jaunpur for four years, and subsequently at Riyazul Uloom, Guraini, Jaunpur district. While taking some students to Darul Uloom Deoband for entrance examinations in Shawwāl 1395 AH (1975 CE), he was influenced by the academic environment there and chose to resume formal studies. He entered directly into the final stages of the Dars-e-Nizami curriculum and completed the hadith year in Shaʿbān 1397 AH (July 1977), graduating from there.

At Deoband seminary, his teachers of ḥadīth included Sharif Hasan Deobandi, Muhammad Tayyib Qasmi, Mahmood Hasan Gangohi, Naseer Ahmad Khan, Abdul Ahad Deobandi, Mirajul Haq Deobandi, Fakhrul Hasan Moradabadi, Muhammad Husain Bihari, Muhammad Naʿim Deobandi, Wahiduzzaman Kairanawi, Nizamuddin Azami, Muhammad Salim Qasmi, Anzar Shah Kashmiri, Khurshid Alam Deobandi, Qamaruddin Ahmad Gorakhpuri, Abdullah Saleem Deobandi, Saeed Ahmad Palanpuri, and Abdul Khaliq Madrasi.

In addition, he obtained authorizations (ijāzah) in ḥadīth from Muhammad Zakariyya Kandhlawi and Abd al-Fattah Abu Ghudda.

His teachers in the sciences of tajwīd and qirāʾāt included ʿAbdul Qayyūm Azami, Qāri Muʿīnuddīn, and Muhammad Mustafa Mauwi. He also benefited from further study in these disciplines with Mohibbuddin Alahābādi, a student of Abdul Rehman Makki.

== Career ==
After graduating from Darul Uloom Deoband, Azami served four years at Madrasa Asghariyyah, Deoband, and one year at Madrasa Shahi, Moradabad, in tajwīd and qirā'āt instruction. On the invitation of Asad Madani he joined Darul Uloom Deoband and in Dhū al-Qa‘dah 1402 AH he was appointed to the Department of Tajwīd and Qirā'āt. After one year he was assigned the headship of that department.

In a 2008 report by the Hindustan Times, Azami—then serving as professor of Qur'anic recitation at Darul Uloom Deoband—emphasized the importance of discipline in Islamic education, stating that "discipline is critical to the study of Islam; nobody can rise late."

He resigned from Darul Uloom Deoband in Rabīʿ al-Thānī 1434 AH (February 2013) following disputes with the administration.

Since October 2015 he has been a member of the subsidiary organization al-Hay’ah al-‘Ālamiyyah li-Tahfīz al-Qur'ān al-Karīm of Muslim World League (Mecca).

He is an authorised disciple of Abrarul Haq Haqqi in Sufism.

== Writings ==
In addition to teaching, Azami has authored numerous works on tajwīd, qirā'āt and the history and orthography of the Qur'an. His total output is reported in sources as approximately 150 works, of which about 90 are on Qur'anic sciences specifically.

His two-volume work, Husn al-Muḥāḍarāt fī Rijāl al-Qirā’āt, contains biographical accounts of approximately seven hundred Qur’an reciters (qurrāʾ).

His commentaries, translations and explanations in the field of tajwīd and qirā'āt include works such as al-Nafhah al-‘Anbariyyah sharḥ al-Muqaddimah al-Jazariyyah, al-Nafahāt al-Qāsimiyyah sharḥ al-Shāṭibiyyah, al-Taḥfah al-Jamīlah sharḥ al-‘Aqīlah (al-Rā’iyyah) lil-Shāṭibī, al-Tabshīr sharḥ al-Taysīr fī al-Sab‘ah by al-Durrānī, al-Fawā’id al-Durriyyah tarjamat al-Muqaddimah al-Jazariyyah, al-Fawā’id al-Bahiyyah sharḥ al-Durrah al-Maḍiyyah, Iḍāḥ al-‘Ashr fī Ḥall Ṭayyibat al-Nashr, Iẓhār al-Ni‘am (a translation of Abu Muhammad al-Makki’s work), Muʿarrab wa mutarjam Khulāṣat al-Bayān, Taḥṣīl al-Yusr sharḥ Nāẓimat al-Zuhr, Mawrid al-Ẓamʿān sharḥ Khulāṣat al-Bayān, al-Hadiyyah al-Rāṭibiyyah fī Tarjamat al-Shāṭibiyyah and ʿUmdat al-Aqwāl (translation of Tuḥfat al-Aṭfāl by al-Jamzuri.

His marginalia (ḥawāshī) include titles such as al-Ḥawāshī al-Ḥasanīyyah ʿalā al-Fawā’id al-Makkiyyah, Iḍāḥ al-Waqf ḥawāshī Jāmiʿ al-Waqf, Ḍiyā’ al-Nujūm ḥawāshī Maʿrifat al-Rusūm and Bayān al-ʿIrfān ḥawāshī Jamāl al-Qur’ān.

His works on the history of qirā'āt, the Qur'anic orthography and related services include titles such as ʿIlm al-Qirā’āt wa al-Qurrā’ al-Sabʿah, Dār al-ʿUlūm Deoband wa Khidamāt al-Tajwīd wa al-Qirā’āt, Husn al-Muḥāḍarāt fī Rijāl al-Qirā’āt (in two volumes), Tārīkh ʿIlm al-Qirā’āt: taḥrīj wa tashrīḥ ḥadīth “Sabʿat al-Aḥruf”, Asāṭīn ʿIlm al-Qirā’āt, Akābir ʿUlamā’ al-Ummah wa Iʿtinā’uhum bi al-Qirā’āt, Ḥadīth Sabʿat al-Aḥruf wa ʿAllāmah Ibn Jarīr al-Ṭabarī, Tārīkh Shuʿbat al-Qirā’ah Dār al-ʿUlūm Deoband, Hindustān wa ʿIlm al-Tajwīd wa al-Qirā’āt: Māḍī wa Ḥāl, Markaz al-ʿIlm wa al-Faḍl Pānīpat wa Khidamāt al-Tajwīd wa al-Qirā’āt, Rasm al-Muṣḥaf wa Maṣādiruh, Kuttāb al-Waḥy, Qur’ānī Imlā wa Rasm al-Khaṭṭ, and Darbar-i-Risālat ke Mustanad Qurrāʾ.

His other authored and compiled works include the following:

- Mukhtaṣar Maʿārif al-Qur’ān (a three-volume abridgment of Muhammad Shafi Usmani’s tafsīr Maʿārif al-Qur’ān, incorporating notes on qirā’āt variations in each surah)
- Qawāʿid al-Tajwīd (a book written on the rules of Tajwid, keeping in mind the psychology of children)
- al-Dirāsāt fī ʿIlm al-Tajwīd wa al-Qirā’āt
- ʿIlm al-Tajwīd wa al-Qirā’āt: Ahamiyyat wa Ḍarūrat – Ek Jaiza
- Naṯr al-Marjān fī Taʿdād Āyāt al-Qur’ān
- Ghunyat al-Ṭālibīn fī Tadhkirat al-Imām al-Shāṭibī
- Tadhkirat al-Taṣānīf wa al-Muṣannifīn
- Ḥaḍrat Thanwī ke Pasandīdah Wāqiʿāt
- Abu ʿUbayd al-Qāsim ibn Sallām: Who Was He?
- Ye The Shaykh al-Islām Mawlānā Ḥusayn Aḥmad Madanī
- Imām al-Hind Mawlānā Abul Kalam Azad
- Dhikr al-Abrār
- Ek Dil Āwīz Shakhṣiyyat: Mawlānā ʿAbd al-Khāliq Madrasī
- Dīnī Taʿlīm aur Madāris
- Adillat al-Arbaʿah se ʿIlm
- Adillat al-Arbaʿah se ʿIlm al-Tajwīd ka Thubūt
- Ithāf al-Barrarah bi al-Mutūn al-ʿAsharah (critical edition)
