= Khurshid Anwar Gayavi =

Indian Sunni Islamic scholar

Mawlana, Mufti Khurshid Anwar Gayavi

Head of the Education Department, Darul Uloom Deoband
- In office 2019 – March 2022
- Preceded by: Muhammad Yusuf Tawli
- Succeeded by: Hussain Ahmad Haridwari

Personal life
- Born: November 12, 1964 Hirdai Chak, Arwal district (formerly part of Gaya district), Bihar, India
- Parent: Muhammad Adil (father)
- Education: Darul Uloom Deoband
- Known for: Teaching Hadith at Darul Uloom Deoband
- Occupation: Islamic scholar, teacher

Religious life
- Religion: Islam
- Denomination: Sunni

Khurshid Anwar Gayavi (born 12 November 1964) is an Indian Sunni Islamic scholar and a senior teacher of Hadith at Darul Uloom Deoband, an influential Islamic seminary in India. He has served the institution in various academic and administrative capacities, including as the head of the Education Department (Nazim-e-Ta'leemat) from 2019 to 2022. Gayavi has contributed to Islamic scholarship through his editorial work on classical texts in Arabic grammar and logic, as well as through treatises on jurisprudence.

== Early life and education ==
Khurshid Anwar Gayavi was born on 12 November 1964 in Hirdai Chak, in Gaya district (now Arwal district), Bihar, India. His father, Muhammad Adil, was a graduate of Darul Uloom Deoband and had studied under scholars such as Hussain Ahmad Madani, Izaz Ali Amrohi, and Muhammad Ibrahim Balyawi. He served as Sheikh al-Hadith at Jamia Arabia Ashrafia, Naya Bhojpur, Bihar, and later became the administrator of Madrasa Anwarul Uloom, Gaya. His grandfather, Moulvi Abdul Ghafur, was associated with Imarat-e-Shariah, Phulwari Sharif, Patna.

Gayavi began his education under his father at Madrasa Khairul Uloom in Tori, Chandwa, Jharkhand. He studied briefly at Madrasa Faiz-ur-Rashid in Sisai, formerly in Ranchi district, and later continued Qur'anic memorization in his village. He completed his memorization at Madrasa Anwarul Uloom, Gaya. He then studied Persian and Arabic texts at Madrasa Rahmaniya, Roorkee, including Gulistan, Bustan, Yusuf Zulaikha, Sikandar Nama, Akhlaq-e-Mohsini, and Risala Abdul Wasi. He completed studies up to the third Arabic year. He then continued at Madrasa Khadimul Uloom, Baghonwali, Muzaffarnagar.

He enrolled at Darul Uloom Deoband where, after initially facing admission difficulties in a year of administrative change, he was admitted and completed sixth and seventh year classes. He also completed the Daurah Hadith (Hadith specialization) and Ifta course, graduating in 1984 (1404 AH).

During his Hadith studies, he was taught by several notable scholars. He studied Sahih al-Bukhari with Naseer Ahmad Khan and Abdul Haq Azmi, Muwatta Imam Malik with Abdul Haq Azmi, Jami' al-Tirmidhi with Saeed Ahmad Palanpuri and Mirajul Haq Deobandi, Sahih Muslim with Arshad Madani and Qamaruddin Ahmad Gorakhpuri, Sunan Abi Dawud with Muhammad Hussain Bihari and Nematullah Azami, Sunan ibn Majah with Riyasat Ali Zafar Bijnori, Sunan al-Nasa'i with Arshad Madani, and Shama'il al-Tirmidhi with Abdul Khaliq Madrasi.

== Career ==
After graduating in 1984, Gayavi began his teaching career as an assistant instructor at Darul Uloom Deoband, where he served for approximately two years. He later taught the children of senior scholar Saeed Ahmad Palanpuri for about one and a half years.

In 1988 (1409 AH), he received his formal appointment as a teacher at Darul Uloom Deoband. Over the years, he has taught various advanced Islamic texts including the second volume of Sunan Abu Dawud, the second volume of Mishkat al-Masabih, Hujjatullah-il-Balighah, and portions of the Hanafi jurisprudential curriculum (Dars-e-Shami).

In 2019 (1440 AH), he was promoted to the rank of senior teacher (darja-e-ʿulyā) at the institution and, in the same year, was appointed as the head of the Education Department (Nazim-e-Ta'leemat) by the governing council of Darul Uloom Deoband. He held this position until March 2022. During a meeting of the governing body (Majlis-e-Shura) held on 14–15 March 2022, Gayavi submitted his resignation from the post due to personal reasons. The position remained vacant until 28 March 2022, when Hussain Ahmad Haridwari was appointed as his successor.

== Literary contributions ==
Gayavi has contributed to Islamic scholarship by editing and arranging classical texts in Arabic grammar and logic. His work includes:

- Miftah al-Tahdhib, an Urdu commentary on Tahdhib al-Mantiq, a well-known text on logic authored by Saeed Ahmad Palanpuri. The commentary was originally compiled by Palanpuri's eldest son, Rashid Ahmad Palanpuri (1966–1995), and later edited and arranged by Gayavi.
- Miftah al-Awamal, a revised edition of an Urdu commentary on Sharh Miʾat ʿAmil (a classical primer on Arabic grammar) originally authored by Syed Fakhruddin Ahmad. The work was revised by Saeed Ahmad Palanpuri and edited and arranged by Gayavi.

He has also written a treatise titled Hayat al-Anbiya and authored various articles on Islamic jurisprudence (fiqh), some of which were presented at academic seminars.
