= Ishtiaque Ahmad Qasmi =

Indian Islamic scholar

Dr., Mufti Ishtiaque Ahmad Qasmi

Personal life
- Born: 7 January 1978 (age 48) Jhamta, Saharsa district, Bihar, India
- Home town: Jhagrua, Darbhanga district, Bihar, India
- Main interest(s): Tafsir, Fiqh, Urdu literature
- Notable work(s): Tirāzi (commentary), Kulliyāt-e-Kashif (compilation), Mālā Budda Minhu (translation)
- Education: Darul Uloom Deoband; Maulana Azad National Urdu University; Dars-e-Nizami (Aalimiyyah), M.A., MPhil, PhD
- Occupation: Islamic scholar, mufti, and writer

Religious life
- Religion: Islam
- Denomination: Sunni
- Jurisprudence: Hanafi
- Movement: Deobandi

Muslim leader
- Teacher: Mahmood Hasan Gangohi; Nizamuddin Azami; Abdul Haq Azmi; Nematullah Azami; Habibur Rahman Khairabadi; Zafeeruddin Miftahi; Naseer Ahmad Khan; Qamruddin Ahmad Gorakhpuri; Saeed Ahmad Palanpuri; Arshad Madani; Habibur Rahman Azami; Usman Mansoorpuri; Abdul Khaliq Madrasi; Shamshul Hoda Daryabadi

Ishtiaque Ahmad Qasmi (born 7 January 1978) is an Indian Islamic scholar, mufti, and writer who has been serving as a teacher at Darul Uloom Deoband since 2008. He is an alumnus of both Darul Uloom Deoband and Maulana Azad National Urdu University.

== Early life and education ==
As per official documents, Ishtiaque Ahmad Qasmi was born on 7 January 1978 in his maternal village, Jamtha, located in the Saharsa district of Bihar, India. His ancestral village is Jhagrua, situated in Darbhanga district.

He received his primary and secondary education at Madrasa Maarif Uloom Jhagarua, Darbhanga, Madrasa Falah Al-Muslimeen, Bikram, Madrasa Qasim Uloom, Mungarawan, Azamgarh, and Madrasa Riyazul Uloom, Guraini, Jaunpur.

In 1996, he completed his graduation in Dars-e-Nizami from Darul Uloom Deoband. In 1997 and 1999, he completed his postgraduate courses in Islamic jurisprudence from there, respectively. At the Deoband seminary, his teachers included Mahmood Hasan Gangohi, Nizamuddin Azami, Abdul Haq Azmi, Nematullah Azami, Habibur Rahman Khairabadi, Zafeeruddin Miftahi, Naseer Ahmad Khan, Qamruddin Ahmad Gorakhpuri, Saeed Ahmad Palanpuri, Arshad Madani, Habibur Rahman Azami, Usman Mansoorpuri, and Abdul Khaliq Madrasi.

He holds an MA, MPhil, and PhD in Urdu from Maulana Azad National Urdu University in Hyderabad.

== Career ==
From 1999 to 2000, Qasmi was an assistant teacher at Darul Uloom Deoband. Between 2000 and 2008, he served as a teacher and Deputy Mufti at Darul Uloom, Hyderabad. He was appointed to Darul Uloom Deoband in 1430 AH (2008 AD) as a teacher and has been teaching there ever since.

== Literary works ==
Qasmi's M.Phil. thesis was titled Muntakhab Mazhabī ʿUlamā Ke Sheʿrī Majmūʿoṅ Kā Tanqīdī Jāʾiza (transl. A Critical Study of the Poetic Collections of Selected Religious Scholars), which consisted of an analytical study of the published poetry of Muhammad Tayyib Qasmi, Kafilur Rahman Nishat Usmani, and Riyasat Ali Zafar Bajnori. Also, his PhD thesis was entitled Ulama E Deoband Ki Swaneh Umriyon Ka Tanqeedi Tajziya [Azadi Se Qabl] (transl. A critical review of Deobandi scholars' Urdu biographies [pre-independence]). More than 250 of his articles have been published in national and foreign magazines and newspapers.

=== Books ===
His works include:

- Tirāzi (an Urdu commentary on Siraj al-Din al-Sajawandi's Sirāji; it is translated into Persian, Pashto, and Bangla as well.)
- Sab Se Āsān Tarjama-e-Quran Majīd (an Urdu translation of the Quran)
- Khāssiyāt-e-Fusool-e-Akbari (Research and footnote on Ali Akbar Hussaini's authored book Fusool-e-Akbari)
- Mukhtasar Khāssiyāt-e-Abwāb (a partial Urdu translation of Hussaini's same book)
- Maulan Bastavi Ka Zikr-e-Jamīl (a biographical sketch of Abdur Rahim Bastavi)
- Maulan Saeed Ahmad Akbarabadi Ka Zikr-e-Jamīl (a biographical sketch of Saeed Ahmad Akbarabadi)
- Zaib o Zeenat Ke Ahkām (transl. Islamic rules of adornment)
- Kulliyāt-e-Kāshif (Compilation of Usman Kashif Al-Hashmi's Poetry Collection)
- Mā lā Budda Minhu (An Urdu translation of Sanaullah Panipati's Persian book, Mā lā Budda Minhu, is included in the curriculum of the Persian department of Darul Uloom Deoband.)
- An-Noor Al-Faïd (an Urdu translation and commentary of Anwar Shah Kashmiri's Persian verse booklet and accompanying Syed Fakhruddin Ahmad's continuation.)
- Imān Bachāiye! (transl. Save faith!)
- Ansari Sāhab Ka Zikr-e-Jamīl (a biographical sketch of Rahīmuddīn Ansari, former head of Jamia Islamia Darul Uloom, Hyderabad)

== See also ==
- List of Deobandis
