= Mufti Abdul Razzaq =

Indian Muslim scholar (1925–2021)

Grand Mufti of Madhya Pradesh Mufti Abdul Razzaq
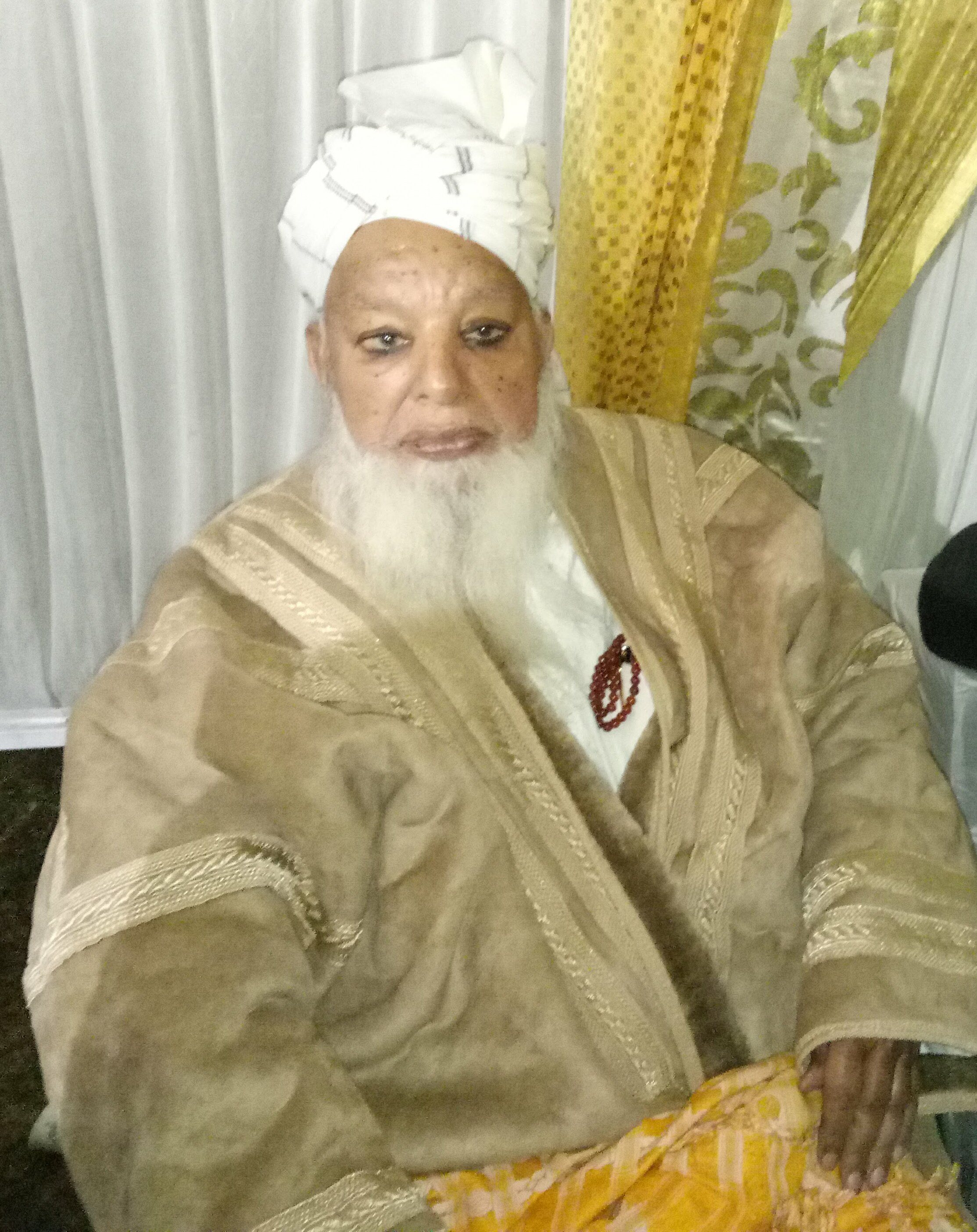
- Razzaq in 2018

9th General Secretary of Jamiat Ulama-e-Hind
- In office 12 October 1991 – 22 January 1995
- Preceded by: Asrarul Haq Qasmi
- Succeeded by: Abdul Aleem Farooqui

Mufti of Bhopal city
- In office 1974–1983

Vice-Mufti of Dārul Qadha, Bhopal
- In office 1958–1968

Chief-Judge of Dārul Qadha, Bhopal
- In office 1968–1974

Personal life
- Born: 13 August 1925
- Died: 26 May 2021 (aged 95) Bhopal, Madhya Pradesh, India
- Education: Darul Uloom Deoband

Religious life
- Religion: Islam
- Founder of: Madrasa Jamia Islamia Arabia, Bhopal

Mufti Abdul Razzaq (also known as Abdul Razzaque Khan; 13 August 1925 – 26 May 2021) was an Indian Muslim scholar, mufti and an activist of the Indian independence movement, who served as the ninth general secretary of the Jamiat Ulama-e-Hind. He was the vice-president of Jamiat Ulama-e-Hind's Arshad faction. He established the Madrasa Jamia Islamia Arabia in Bhopal.

== Biography ==
Abdul Razzāq was born on 13 August 1925. He was schooled in Masjid Malang Shah, Jamia Darul Uloom Ilāhiya and Jamia Aḥmadiya in Bhopal. In July 1952, he joined the Darul Uloom Deoband to complete his studies. He studied Sahih Bukhari with Hussain Ahmad Madani; Sahih Muslim with Fakhrul Hasan Moradabadi; Jami' al-Tirmidhi with Muḥammad Ibrāhim Balyawi; Sunan Abu Dawud with Bashīr Aḥmad; Sunan Nasai and Sunan ibn Majah with Mubārak Hussain; Muwatta Imām Muḥammad with Mirajul Haq Deobandi; Muwatta Imam Malik with Sayyid Hasan; Shama'il Muhammadiyah with Muhammad Tayyib Qasmi; and Sharah Wiqāyah with Muhammad Salim Qasmi. He completed studying the "dars-e-nizami" course in 1377 AH and then specialized in "ifta" with Mahdi Hasan Shahjahanpuri.

Razzāq participated in the Indian independence movement. In 1947, he was part of a fight that took place in Bhopal's Qazi camp against the British colonialism. In 1958, he established Madrasa Jamia Islamia Arabia, one of the oldest and largest Islamic seminary in Bhopal. He was patron of various Islamic seminaries in Madhya Pradesh. He was also the state-president of the Darul Uloom Deoband's "Rābta Madāris-e-Islamiya" for Madhya Pradesh. He is credited with the growth and development of Jamiat Ulama-e-Hind in Madhya Pradesh. He was the general secretary Jamiat Ulama-e-Hind from 1991 to 1994. He served as its national vice-president and the state-president for Madhya Pradesh (for Arshad faction). In 1958, he was appointed the vice-mufti of Bhopal's "Dārul Qadha" (Islamic court); and chief-judge in 1968. He served as the Mufti of Bhopal city from 1974 to 1983. He was seen as the Grand Mufti (Mufti-e-Azam) of Madhya Pradesh. He promoted inter-religious harmony by organizing meetings with leaders of various faiths. He was a vivid speaker and instructed Muslims to cope with communal riots with ways befitting the situation.

In 2016, denouncing the Rashtriya Swayamsevak Sangh, Vishva Hindu Parishad and Bajrang Dal activities in Madhya Pradesh; he told Muslims to "maintain peace and not to engage in rioting or other things that could damage the peaceful atmosphere in the State." He expressed, "if someone attacks you and you don't have any other solution but to kill him or to die for saving others from rioters, do not hesitate and go ahead." He also asked the political leaders of Madhya Pradesh to control these right-wing organisations and stop them from attacking and abusing Muslims. He expressed, "if they do not stop, Muslims are not wearing bangles either." The Governor of Madhya Pradesh, Anandiben Patel, honored Razzāq in January 2021 for his participation in the Indian independence movement.

Razzāq died on 26 May 2021. Digvijaya Singh, Kamal Nath and Shivraj Singh Chouhan expressed grief on his death. He was given the guard of honour before being buried.

== Literary works ==
Abdul Razzāq authored more than 50 books including:

- Sarzamīn-e-Hind: Ambiyā Kirām aur Islām
- Qur'ān Main Kya Hai?
- Āzādi, Aslāf aur Jamiat Ulama-e-Hind
- Islāmi Zindagi: Paidā'ish Se Jannat Tak
- Ahle Qur'ān aur Ahle Kitāb

== General bibliography ==
- Abdul Mabood Qasmi (June 2010). Mufti Abdur Razzāq Khān, Halāt-o-Khidmāt m'a Tārīkh Tarjuma wāli Masjid [Mufti Abdur Razzāq Khān, Life and services; and the history of Tarjuma wāli Masjid] (in Urdu). Bhopal: Jamia Islamia Arabia.
