= Noor Alam Khalil Amini =

Indian Islamic scholar (1952–2021)

Mawlāna Noor Alam Khalil Amini

Personal life
- Born: 18 December 1952 Muzaffarpur, India
- Died: 3 May 2021 (aged 68) Deoband, India
- Resting place: Qasmi cemetery
- Main interest(s): Arabic literature, Urdu literature
- Notable work(s): Falastin Fi Intezari Salahidin, Pas-e-Marg-e-Zindah, Wo Koh Kan Ki Baat
- Education: Darul Uloom Mau, Darul Uloom Deoband, Madrasa Aminia, King Saud University

Religious life
- Religion: Islam

Senior posting
- Students: Akram Nadwi, Arif Jameel Mubarakpuri, Mohammad Najeeb Qasmi, Muhammadullah Khalili Qasmi
- Influenced by: Muhammad Miyan Deobandi
- Awards: Presidential Certificate of Honour 2017

Noor Alam Khalil Amini (18 December 1952 – 3 May 2021) was an Indian Sunni Muslim scholar, academic and a litterateur of Arabic and Urdu. He was a senior professor of Arabic language and literature at the Darul Uloom Deoband. His book Falastin Fi Intezari Salahidin was subject of a doctoral study at Assam University and his book Miftahul Arabia is part of dars-e-nizami curricula in various madrasas.

Amini was an alumnus of Darul Uloom Mau, Darul Uloom Deoband, Madrasa Aminia and the King Saud University. His books include Wo Koh Kan Ki Baat, Harf-e-Shireen, Miftah al-Arabiyyah and Falastin Fi Intezari Salahidin.

== Early life and education ==
Noor Alam Khalil Amini was born on 18 December 1952 in Muzaffarpur in Bihar. He was schooled at Madrasa Imdadiya Darbhanga, Darul Uloom Mau and Darul Uloom Deoband. In 1970, he moved to Madrasa Aminia, Kashmiri Gate for graduation in traditional dars-e-nizami studies. His teachers include Abdul Haq Azmi, Wahiduzzaman Kairanawi, Muhammad Miyan Deobandi, and Qamruddin Ahmad Gorakhpuri. He specialized in teaching Arabic language from the King Saud University.

== Career ==
Amini taught Arabic literature at the Darul Uloom Nadwatul Ulama for ten years from 1972 to 1982. He later taught at the Darul Uloom Deoband for a span of 39 years. He served as the chief-editor of Darul Uloom Deoband's monthly Arabic magazine Al-Daie. He was conferred with the President's Certificate of Honour in 2017. His students number more than 1000, including Mohammad Najeeb Qasmi.

Amīni was an author of Arabic and the Urdu language. He wrote extensively in both languages and translated around 25 books from Urdu to Arabic. He wrote more than 500 articles in Arabic language, and those were published in national and international magazines including, Al-Faysal, Al-Jazīrah, Al-Dawah of Riyadh; and Indian magazines like Al-B'as al-Islami, Tameer-e-Hayat and Al-Furqān of Lucknow. His translated works include, Abul Hasan Ali Nadwi's "Appreciation and interpretation of religion in the modern age"; Taqi Usmani's "Muawiyah and historical facts"; Manzoor Nomani's "Iran Revolution, Khumaini and Shi'ism", "Muhammad Ilyas Kandhlawi and his religious reform", "Indian scholars and the propaganda against Muhammad ibn Abdul Wahhab"; and Hussain Ahmad Madani's, "Educational condition of India, before and after the British colonialism".

== Death and legacy ==
Amīni died on 3 May 2021, at his residence in Deoband. Islamic scholars, Abul Qasim Nomani, Arshad Madani, Muhammad Sufyan Qasmi and Mahmood Madani expressed sorrow at his death. His funeral prayer was led by Arshad Madani, and he was buried in the Qasmi cemetery of Darul Uloom Deoband.

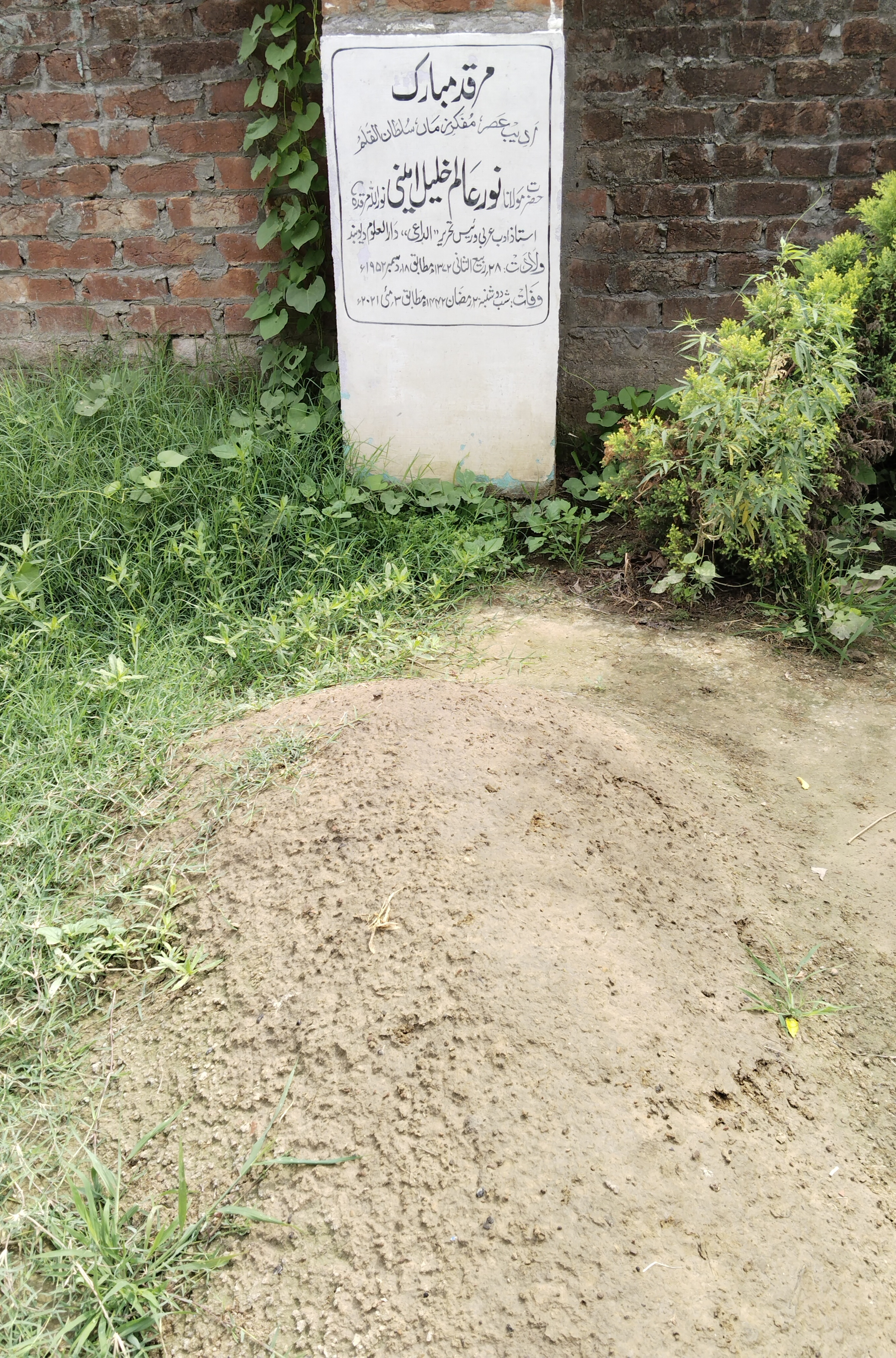
Inscription on Amīni's grave in the Qasmi Cemetery in Deoband

At the Assam University, Abul Kalam wrote his doctoral thesis entitled Socio-Political Aspects in the Writings of Noor Alam Khalil Amini with Special Reference to Falastin Fi Intezari Salahidin.

== Literary works ==
Amini's works in Arabic and Urdu include:

- Al-dawatul islamiyyah bayn al-ams wa al-yawm (Arabic)
- Al-sahabatu wa makanatuhum fi al-Islam (Arabic), published in Urdu as Sahaba-e-Rasool Islam ki Nazar Mai (Companions of Muhammad in the Islamic perspective)
- al-Muslimoona fi al-Hind (Arabic) (The Indian Muslims)
- Falastin Fi Intezari Salahidin (Arabic), published in Urdu as, Falastīn kisi Salāhuddīn ke intezār mai (Palestine waiting for some Salahuddin)
- Harf-e-Shireen (Urdu)
- Kya Islam Paspa Horaha hai (Is Islam dying?)
- Maujuda Saleebi Saihuni Jang (Urdu)
- Miftahul Arabia (Arabic). This book is taught in the dars-e-nizami curriculum in various madrasas.
- Mujtama'tuna al-ma'asarah wa al-tareequ ila al-Islam (Arabic)
- Mata Takoon ul Kitabaat-o- Muassirah? (Arabic)
- Pas-e-Marg-e-Zindah (Urdu)
- Ta'allamu Al-arabiya Fa'innaha Min Deenikum (Arabic)
- Wo Koh Kan Ki Baat (biography of Waheeduz Zaman Kairanwi)

== See also ==
- List of Deobandis
