= Abdul Khaliq Sambhali =

Indian Muslim scholar (1950–2021)

Mawlana Abdul Khaliq Sambhali

Vice-Rector of Darul Uloom Deoband
- In office 2008 – 30 July 2021
- Succeeded by: Muhammad Rashid Azmi

Personal life
- Born: 4 January 1950 Sambhal, United Provinces, India
- Died: 30 July 2021 (aged 71) Muzaffarnagar, Uttar Pradesh, India
- Education: Darul Uloom Deoband

Religious life
- Religion: Islam

Abdul Khaliq Sambhali (4 January 1950 – 30 July 2021) was an Indian Muslim scholar and writer who served as the vice-rector of Darul Uloom Deoband. He was an alumnus of the Deoband seminary and had studied with scholars including Mahmood Hasan Gangohi, Muhammad Tayyib Qasmi and Syed Fakhruddin Ahmad. He translated Abdul Majeed al-Zindani's Al-Tawḥīd into Urdu and gave religious discourses criticizing the Maududism.

== Biography ==
Abdul Khaliq Sambhali was born on 4 January 1950 in Sambhal. He was schooled at the Madrasa Khair al-Madaris and Madrasa Shamsul Uloom in Sambhal. He memorized the Quran under the tutelage of Hafiz Farīduddīn. He went to Darul Uloom Deoband in 1968, and graduated in the Dars-e-Nizami course in 1972. He specialized in Arabic literature in 1973. His teachers included Syed Fakhruddin Ahmad, Muhammad Tayyib Qasmi, Mahmud Hasan Gangohi and Naseer Ahmad Khan.

Sambhali began teaching the Islamic sciences at Madrasa Khadim al-Islam in Hapur in 1973, and then taught at the Madrasa Jami' al-Huda in Moradabad during 1979. He was appointed a teacher at the Darul Uloom Deoband in 1982. In 2008, he was appointed the vice-rector of the seminary. He was a litterateur of Arabic and Urdu, and taught books of hadith such as the Sunan ibn Majah at the Deoband seminary. He also gave discourses on the Poems of Al-Mutanabbi, the Dīwan-e-Mutanabbi, which was considered famous in the seminary. His students included Mohammad Najeeb Qasmi.

In an interview that Sambhali gave to the Deccan Herald in May 2009, he was reported saying that, "We are not against education of girls, but we are against co-education." He was asked about the Taliban closing the schools of girls. In 2017, he said about the Indian government's ban on Triple Talaq that, "no one had a right to change the commandments of Shariah." He translated Abdul Majeed al-Zindani's book Al-Tawḥīd (transl. Monotheism) into Urdu. His discourses on the criticism of Maududism have been published from the Deoband seminary in several volumes.

Sambhali died on 30 July 2021 in Muzaffarnagar. He was buried in the Qasmi cemetery in Deoband. Abul Qasim Nomani, Arshad Madani, Mahmood Madani and Muhammad Sufyan Qasmi expressed grief over his death.

== See more ==
- List of Deobandis
