= Naseer Ahmad Khan (scholar) =

Indian Islamic scholar (1918–2010)

Mawlana Naseer Ahmad Khan

10th Principal of Darul Uloom Deoband
- In office 1991–2008
- Preceded by: Mirajul Haq Deobandi
- Succeeded by: Saeed Ahmad Palanpuri

8th Sheikh al-Hadith of Darul Uloom Deoband
- In office 1977–2008
- Preceded by: Sharif Hasan Deobandi
- Succeeded by: Saeed Ahmad Palanpuri

Deputy Vice Chancellor of Darul Uloom Deoband
- In office 1971–1994
- Preceded by: Mirajul Haq Deobandi
- Succeeded by: Muhammad Usman Deobandi

Personal life
- Born: 23 December 1918 Basi, Bulandshahr district, United Provinces of Agra and Oudh, British India (now Uttar Pradesh, India)
- Died: 4 February 2010 (aged 91) Deoband, Saharanpur district, Uttar Pradesh, India
- Resting place: Qasmi cemetery
- Main interest(s): Tafsir, Hadith, Fiqh, Astronomy
- Education: Madrasa Manba-ul-Uloom Gulaothi; Darul Uloom Deoband
- Occupation: Islamic scholar

Religious life
- Religion: Islam
- Denomination: Sunni Islam
- Jurisprudence: Hanafi
- Creed: Maturidi
- Movement: Deobandi

Senior posting
- Teacher: Hussain Ahmad Madani; Izaz Ali Amrohi; Abdul Haq Akorwi; Muhammad Tayyib Qasmi
- Students: Wahiduzzaman Kairanawi; Mujahidul Islam Qasmi; Saeed Ahmad Palanpuri; Arshad Madani; Abul Qasim Nomani; Usman Mansoorpuri; Abdul Khaliq Sambhali; Sameeruddin Qasmi; Abdul Khaliq Madrasi; Mufti Abdul Razzaq; Ahmed Khanpuri; Abdullah Maroofi; Salman Mansoorpuri; Arif Jameel Mubarakpuri; Salman Bijnori; Ishtiaque Ahmad Qasmi; Yasir Nadeem al Wajidi

Naseer Ahmad Khan (1918–2010), also written as Naseer Ahmad Khan Bulandshahri, was an Indian Islamic scholar and muhaddith. He served as a professor at Darul Uloom Deoband for approximately sixty-five years, during which he taught Sahih al-Bukhari for thirty-two years.

== Early life and education ==
Naseer Ahmad Khan was born on 23 December 1919 (Rabi' Al-Awwal 21, 1337 AH) to Abdush Shakur Khan in Basi, Bulandshahr district, United Provinces of Agra and Oudh, British India.

Naseer Ahmad lost his father when he was four or five years old. After his father's death, he was raised by his elder brother, Bashir Ahmad Khan, who was a teacher at Madrasa Manba-ul-Uloom in Gulaothi, Bulandshahr, at that time. Bashir Ahmad enrolled Naseer Ahmad in Manba-ul-Uloom.

In 1942 (1362 AH), when Bashir Ahmad was appointed as a teacher at Darul Uloom Deoband, Naseer Ahmad also moved to Deoband with him. He enrolled in the Hadith course and studied Sahih al-Tirmidhi and Sahih al-Bukhari under Izaz Ali Amrohi, as Hussain Ahmad Madani was detained in Naini Jail, Allahabad, at that time.

In 1943 (1363 AH), after Hussain Ahmad Madani was released from prison and returned to Deoband, Naseer Ahmad Khan studied Sahih al-Bukhari, Sahih al-Tirmidhi, and other books with him for the third time. He remained in Deoband for another two years, during which he studied various subjects, including tajwid and qira'at, medicine, Islamic logic, and philosophy, under different teachers.

At the Deoband seminary, his teachers include Hussain Ahmad Madani, Izaz Ali Amrohi, Bashir Ahmad Khan, Abdul Khaliq Multani, Abdul Haq Akorwi, Muhammad Tayyib Qasmi, Qazi Shamsuddin, Abdur Rahman Amrohvi, Hifzur Rahman Partapgarhi, and Muhammad Umar Deobandi.

He was an authorized disciple of Asghar Ali Sahaspuri, who was a disciple and attendant of Hussain Ahmad Madani.

== Career ==
After graduation, Naseer Ahmad was offered the position of head reciter at a large seminary in Multan, but his elder brother, Bashir Ahmad, did not agree to send him so far. In 1946 (1365 AH), Naseer Ahmad was appointed as a temporary teacher at Darul Uloom Deoband. Two years later, on 28 Safar 1367 AH, he was appointed as a permanent teacher.

From 1946 (1365 AH) to 2008 (1429 AH), he taught at Darul Uloom Deoband for approximately sixty-five years according to the Islamic calendar and about sixty-three years according to the Gregorian calendar, instructing students in a range of texts from foundational books to Sahih al-Bukhari.

Between 1971 (1391 AH) and 1977 (1397 AH), three books of hadith were attributed to him: Sharḥ Maʿāni al-Āthār, Sahih Muslim (Vol. 2), and Muwatta Imam Malik. Following the death of Sharif Hasan Deobandi, the Sheikh al-Hadith of Darul Uloom, in 1977 (1397 AH), he was appointed Sheikh al-Hadith. He taught both volumes of Sahih al-Bukhari for one year. After that, until his final year, he taught only its first volume. He taught Sahih al-Bukhari for nearly thirty-two years, until 2008 (1429 AH), and there are approximately twenty-five thousand students who studied Sahih al-Bukhari with him.

From 1971 (1391 AH) to 1994 (1414 AH), he served as the Deputy Vice Chancellor of Darul Uloom Deoband for about twenty-three years. Additionally, from 1991 (1412 AH) to 2008 (1429 AH), he held the position of Principal of Darul Uloom Deoband for approximately eighteen years.

In 2008 (1429 AH), he submitted a request to resign from his responsibilities at Darul Uloom Deoband due to old age and various physical ailments. His request was accepted, and he was succeeded by Saeed Ahmad Palanpuri. He was granted a monthly pension of ₹15,000 and retired from his delegated responsibilities.

== Students ==
Naseer Ahmad has thousands of students, including Wahiduzzaman Kairanawi, Mujahidul Islam Qasmi, Khursheed Alam Deobandi, Qamaruddin Ahmad Gorakhpuri, Saeed Ahmad Palanpuri, Arshad Madani, Abul Qasim Nomani, Usman Mansoorpuri, Riyasat Ali Zafar Bijnori, Abdul Khaliq Madrasi, Abdul Khaliq Sambhali, Muhammad Ameen Palanpuri, Mujeebullah Gondwi, Abdul Ali Farooqi, Mufti Abdul Razzaq, Muhammad Salman Mansoorpuri, Wajid Hussain Deobandi, Naseem Akhtar Shah Qaiser, Nadeem al-Wajidi, Abdul Raūf Khan Ghaznavi, Ishtiaque Ahmad Qasm, Yasir Nadeem Al-Wajdi, Sameeruddin Qasmi, Khurshid Anwar Gayavi, Abdullah Maroofi, Salman Bijnori, and Arif Jameel Mubarakpuri. From 1977 to 2008, approximately 28,000 alumni graduated from Darul Uloom during his tenure as Sheikh al-Hadith.

== Astronomy ==
Naseer Ahmad was recognized by his contemporaries as an expert in astronomy. He taught the renowned book on the subject, Al-Tasreeh, for years at Darul Uloom. He also produced a periodical and authored a well-known book on the subject. He also wrote an annotation on Fathiyyah, a book on astronomy, which was published by Maktaba Darul Uloom. His students in this subject are scattered across the country and overseas, with one well-known name being Sameeruddin Qasmi, a resident of Manchester and the author of books on astronomy such as Samrat al-Falkiyyat, Ru'yat-e-Hilāl 'Ilm-e-Falkiyyat Ki Roshni Mein (Moon Sighting in the Light of Astronomy), and the Sameeri Calendar.

== Death and legacy ==
Naseer Ahmad died in Deoband on 4 February 2010 (Safar 19, 1431 AH), at the age of approximately 95 years according to the Islamic calendar and 92 years according to the Gregorian calendar. Thousands of people attended his funeral prayer at Darul Uloom Deoband, which was led by Usman Mansoorpuri. He was buried in the Qasmi Cemetery.

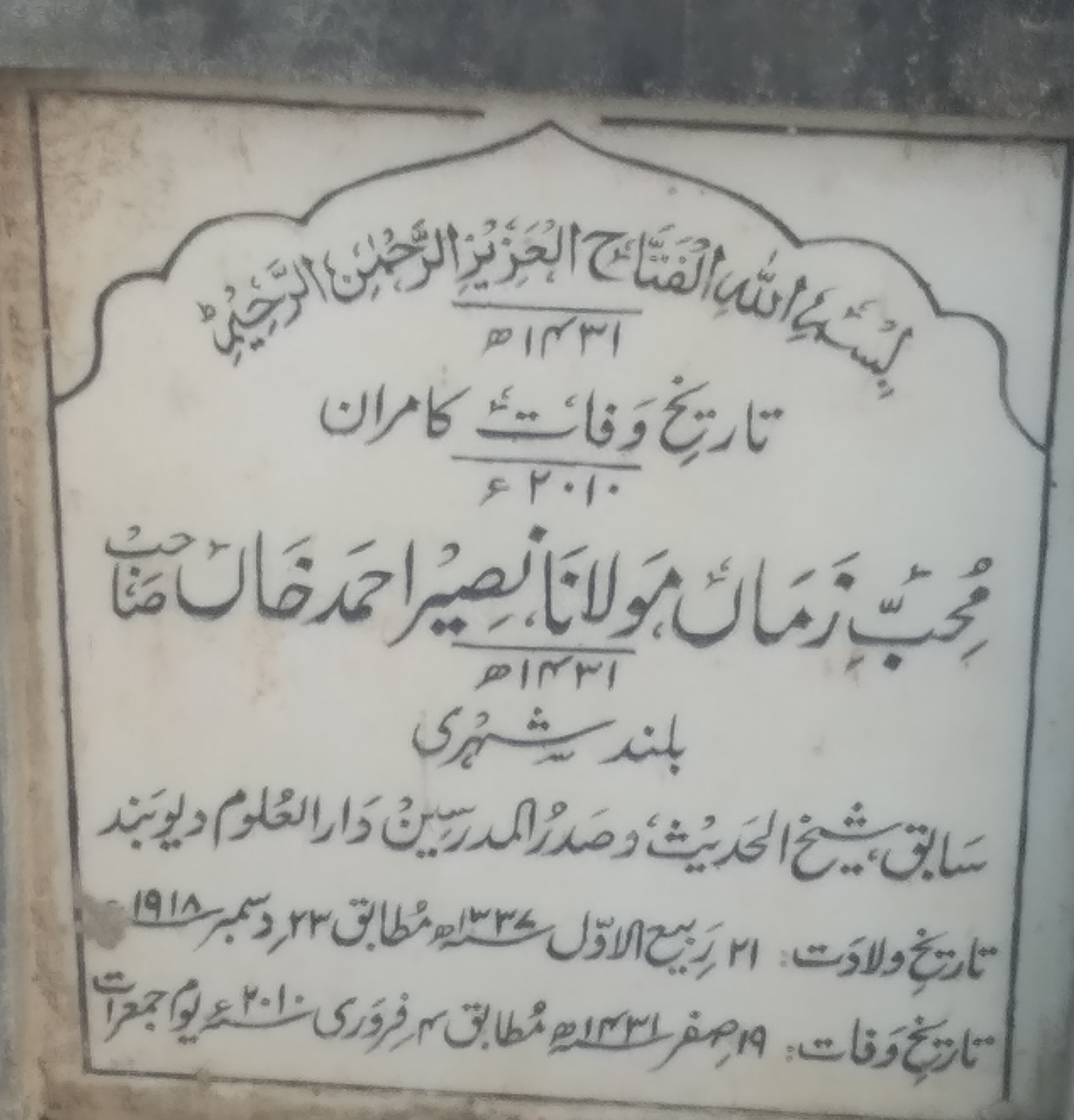
An inscription on the grave of Naseer Ahmad Khan

He left behind five boys and two daughters when he died. The sons include Zameer Ahmed Khan, Rafi Ahmed Khan, Aziz Ahmed Khan, Shakeel Ahmed Khan, and Aqeel Ahmed Khan, all of them are Quran Hafiz.
