= Sameeruddin Qasmi =

Indian Islamic scholar (b. 1950)

Mawlana Sameeruddin Qasmi
- Born: Muhammad Samiruddin; 6 November 1950 (age 75); Ghutti, Godda district, Bihar (now Jharkhand)
- Education: Aalimiyyah
- Years active: 1973–present
- Notable work: Athmār al-Hidāya, Ash-Sharh ath-Thamīri, Thamrat al-Najah, Thamrat al-Falakiyyāt, Thamrat al-Awzān
- Website: https://www.samiruddinqasmi.com/

Sameeruddin Qasmi (born 6 November 1950), also written as Samiruddin Qasmi, is an Indian Islamic scholar based in the UK, specializing in Islamic astronomy, hadith, Hanafi jurisprudence, and Islamic theology.

== Early life and education ==
Sameeruddin Qasmi was born on 6 November 1950 in the village of Ghutti, Godda district, in the former state of Bihar, India (now Jharkhand).

He began his early education at a local maktab and continued his studies at various religious institutions across India. He completed his advanced studies at Darul Uloom Deoband in 1970, studying under notable scholars such as Syed Fakhruddin Ahmad, Muhammad Tayyib Qasmi, Anzar Shah Kashmiri, Naseer Ahmad Khan, Mahmood Hasan Gangohi, Wahiduzzaman Kairanawi, and Muhammad Salim Qasmi.

He has particularly benefited from Naseer Ahmad Khan in the field of Islamic astronomy and from Wahiduzzaman Kairanawi in Arabic.

== Career ==
Qasmi began teaching in Gujarat, India, before moving to the United Kingdom, where he taught in institutions including Darul Uloom of Dewsbury and Jamia Islamia of Feltham and Manchester. In 2000, he transitioned to full-time writing and has authored several works in Islamic jurisprudence and theology.

He serves as the Chairman of the Religious Committee at the Moon Research Centre, UK. He has also participated in seminars of the Islamic Fiqh Academy.

In December 2021, Qasmi denied allegations linking Tablighi Jamaat to terrorism in a video message from the UK. He stated that the Tablighi Jamaat opposes, condemns, and disowns terrorism, focusing solely on the five pillars of Islam and refraining from any negative comments on religions, communities, or countries. Qasmi suggested that the Saudi government may have been misled in its decision to ban the organization.

== Literary works ==
Qasmi has written extensively on Islamic law and theology. His work is often referenced in the field of Islamic beliefs and theology, particularly in the analysis of various intellectual and conceptual perspectives on Allah. Notable works include:

- Athmār al-Hidayah (a thirteen-volume Urdu commentary on Al-Marghinani's Al-Hidayah in Hanafi jurisprudence)
- Al-Sharh al-Thamīri (a four-volume Urdu commentary on Al-Quduri's Mukhtasar in Hanafi jurisprudence)
- Thamart-un-Najāh (a two-volume Urdu commentary on Ash-Shurunbulali's Noor Al-Idaah)
- Thamarat al-Aqāid (a book on Islamic theology in which 350 beliefs are outlined, with each belief supported by ten verses and ten hadiths as evidence, translated into multiple languages, including English and Arabic)
- Thamarat-ul-Falkiyyāt (a book on Islamic astronomy)
- Thamrat al-Awzān
- Thamīri Calendar
- Science Aur Qur’ān (transl. Science and the Quran; in which 95 scientific topics are discussed in the light of the Quran with scholarly analysis).
- Hanafiyah ka maslak ihtiyaaṭ par hai (transl. The Hanafi school of thought is based on caution.)

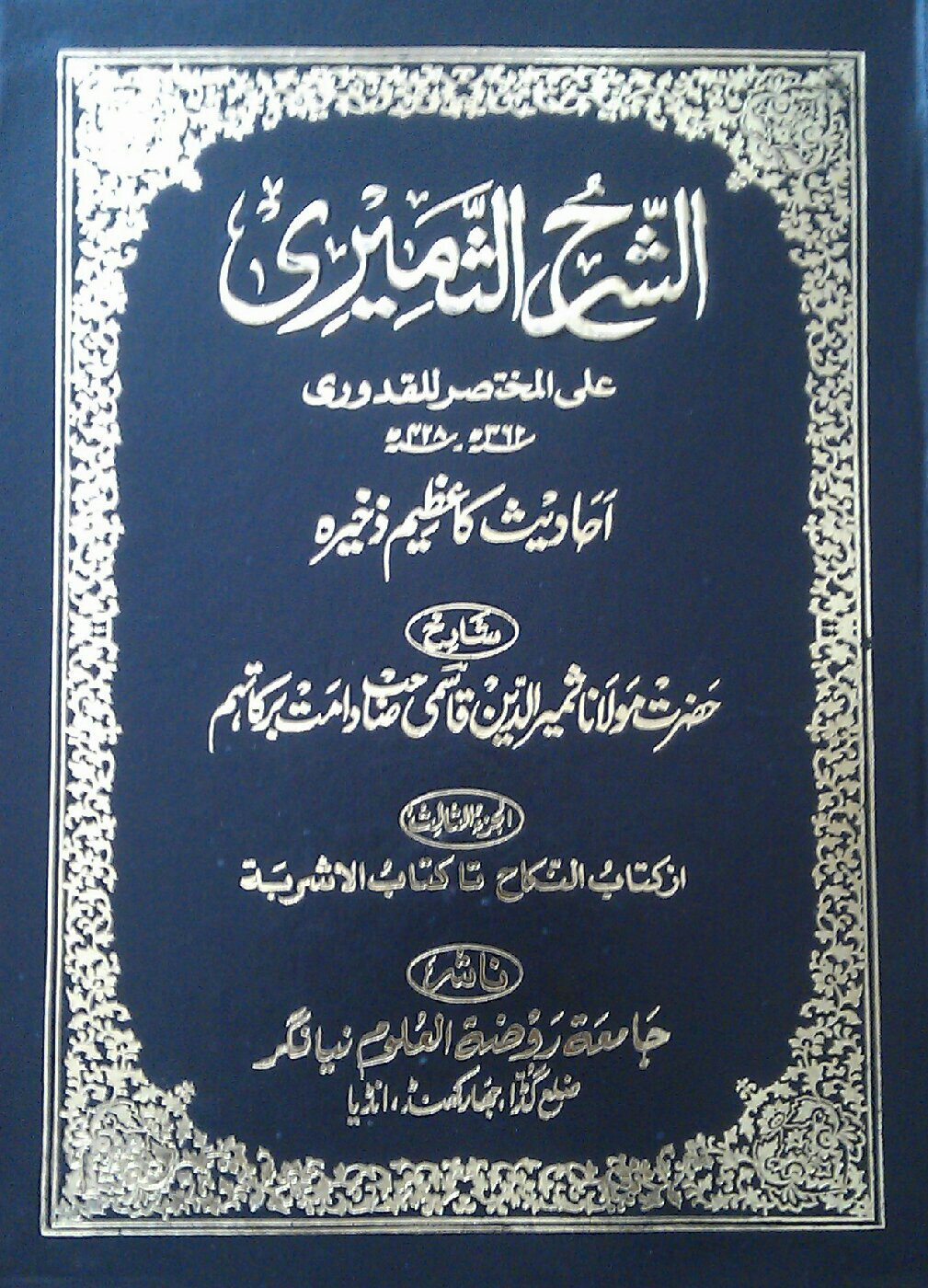
Title page of Al-Sharh al-Thamīri (Volume III)

His publications focus on Hanafi jurisprudence, aiming to provide detailed discussions on Islamic legal principles and theological issues.
