= Arif Jameel Mubarakpuri =

Indian Islamic scholar (b. 1971)

Maulana Arif Jameel Mubarakpuri
- Born: Muhammad Arif; 10 March 1971 (age 54); Mubarakpur, Azamgarh, Uttar Pradesh, India
- Occupations: Islamic scholar, licentiate, translator, and writer

Academic background
- Education: Aalimiyyah, Licentiate, Postgraduate diploma
- Alma mater: Ehyaul Uloom Mubarakpur; Darul Uloom Deoband; Islamic University of Madinah; King Saud University

Academic work
- Main interests: Tafsir, Hadith studies, Fiqh, Islamic History, Arabic literature, Urdu literature
- Notable works: Al-Mu'tasar Min Āthār as-Sunan (Hadith study), Badīhiyyāt e Quran e Karīm (Quran study), Mausoo'a-tu-Ulama-i-Deoband (Biography), Mausoo'a-tu-Ulama-i-Deoband (Biography), Al-Imām Muhammad Qasmi An-Nanawtawi Kama Ra’aituhu (translation)

Muhammad Arif Jameel Mubarakpuri (born 10 March 1971), is an Indian Islamic scholar and Arabic and Urdu language writer. He is a professor of Arabic language and literature at Darul Uloom Deoband. He is the current Editor-in-Chief of Arabic monthly, Al-Daie.

Mubarakpuri is an alumnus of Ehyaul Uloom Mubarakpur, Darul Uloom Deoband, the Islamic University of Madinah, and King Saud University. His books include Al-Mu'tasar Min Āthār as-Sunan, Badīhiyyāt e Quran e Karīm, Mausoo'a-tu-Ulama-i-Deoband, and Al-Imām Muhammad Qasmi An-Nanawtawi Kama Ra’aituhu.

== Early life and education ==
Muhammad Arif Jameel Mubarakpuri was born on 10 March 1971 in Mubarakpur, Azamgarh, in the Indian state of Uttar Pradesh. His father, Jameel Ahmad Qasmi Mubarakpuri (d. 2018), was an alumnus of Dar Uloom Deoband, a student of Syed Fakhruddin Ahmad, and a teacher of scholars like Ijaz Ahmad Azmi, Abu Bakr Ghazipuri, and Naseem Ahmad Barabankwi.

He completed his graduation from Jamia Arabia Ehyaul Uloom, Mubarakpur, in 1407 AH (1987 AD), and then in 1409 AH (1989 AD), he re-graduated from Darul Uloom Deoband by studying the course of Daura-e-Hadith (the last year in Dars-e-nizami). He studied Sahih al-Bukhari with Naseer Ahmad Khan. He completed Arabic literature from there in 1410 AH (1990 AD).

He secured the degree of Licentiate (Arabic: الليسانس) in Islamic law from the Faculty of Shariah, Islamic University of Madinah, in 1414–15 AH (1994–95 AD) and did a Postgraduate Diploma in Teaching the Arabic Language (Arabic: الدبلوم العالي في تعليم اللغة العربية) from King Saud University, Riyadh, in 1423–24 AH (2002–3 AD).

In 1416 AH (1995 AD), he was awarded the Certificate of Excellence and Academic Excellence (Arabic: شهادة التفوق و النبوغ الدراسي) by the Governor of Madinah.

== Career ==
After graduating from Deoband Seminary, Mubarakpuri was an assistant teacher there from 1411 to 1412 AH (1991 to 92 AD). In 1417 AH (1996 AD), he was appointed as a teacher at Darul Uloom Deoband for the first time, remaining there until 1418 AH (1997 AD).

He worked as a translator at the Public Prosecution Portal (Arabic: النيابة العامة), Sharjah, UAE, for about three and a half years until 1998. He served as a professor of hadith and Arabic literature for about five years at Jamia Arabia Ehyaul Uloom, Mubarakpur. Then again, he was appointed as a professor in 1431 AH (2010 AD) at Darul Uloom Deoband and was promoted to a high rank in 1441 AH (2020 AD).

He is an Arabic and Urdu writer and a notable student of Noor Alam Khalil Amini. His articles continue to be published in famous Arabic and Urdu journals like Al-Baath Al-Islami, Al-Daie, Darul Uloom, and Ma'arif Azamgarh.

In Jumada al-Ula 1435 AH (June 2014 AD), he was appointed as an associate editor for Al-Daie on the recommendation of his teacher and editor of Al-Daie, Amini. After Amini's demise, the advisory committee of Darul Uloom Deoband promoted him from associate editor to Editor-in-Chief of Al-Daie.

He is translating Tafseer-e-Usmani by Shabbir Ahmad Usmani in installments through Al-Daie's column, Al-Fikr al-Islami. By appointment of the Islamic Fiqh Academy, India, he translated about 4000 pages of the Encyclopedia of Islamic Jurisprudence into Urdu. On Amini's advice, he started the Arabic translation of Syed Mehboob Rizwi's Urdu version of the History of Darul Uloom Deoband, which is still in progress.

== Literary works ==
The following books are included in Mubarakpuri's Urdu and Arabic works and Urdu-to-Arabic or Arabic-to-Urdu translations:

- Al-Mu'tasar Min Athar al-Sunan wa I'la al-Sunan (Arabic)
- Badīhiyyāt e Qur’ān e Karīm (Urdu)
- Naujawān: Masā’il, Mushkilāt, Tajziya, aur Hal (Urdu translation of the Arabic book Al-Shabāb: Mushkilāt wa Hulool.)
- Mausoo'a-tu-Ulama-i-Deoband (Arabic; Encyclopaedia on the Fourteenth Century's Deobandi Scholars)
- Lamhatun ‘an al-Jami'a al-Islamia: Dar al-Uloom Deoband (Arabic; An overview of Jamia Islamia Darul Uloom Deoband)
- Al-Jami'a al-Islamia: Dar al-Uloom Deoband Kama Yarāha as-Shakhsiyyāt as-Sa‘ūdiyyā (Arabic; Islamic University: Dar Al Uloom Deoband as seen by Saudi figures)
- Tashīl al-Mu'tasar (Urdu; a facilitated version of his own work, Al-Mu'tasar)
- Zaib o Zīnat Ke Shar'i Ahkām (Urdu; Shariah rules of adornment)
- Sahaba-e-Kirām Islām Ki Nazar Mein (Urdu translation of Noor Alam Khalil Amini's Arabic book As-Sahāba wa Makānatuhum fil-Islam)
- Masjid-e-Nabawi Mein Tarāwīh ‘Ahd Ba ‘Ahd (Urdu translation of 'Atiyah bin Muhammad Saalim's Arabic book At-Tarāwīh Aktharu Min Alfi 'Ām Fī Masjid An-Nabawi)
- Al-Imamah wa al-Khilāfah (Arabic translation of the book Imamāt o Khilāfat by Abdush Shakoor Lakhnavi.)
- Al-Imām Muhammad Qasim An-Nanawtawi Kama Ra’aituhu (Arabic translation of the book Hālāt-e-Tayyib Janāb Maulvi Muhammad Qasim Sahab Marhūm by Yaqub Nanautawi)
- Maraqi al-Falah (Urdu translation of the book Maraqi al-Falah by Ash-Shurunbulali.)
- Al Fitna-tud-Dajjāliyyah wa Malāmihuha al-bārizah wa ishārātuha fī sūrati al-Kahf (Arabic translation of Manazir Ahsan Gilani's book Sūra e Kahf Ki Tafsīr Ke Tanāzur Mein Dajjāli Fitna Ke Numāyañ Khadd o Khāl [Tadhkīr Bi Sūrat al-Kahf])
- Salfiyyat Ek Jaizah (Urdu translation of the Arabic book As-Salafiyyah Marhaltun Zamaniyyah Mubarakah; La Madhhabun Islamiyy by Muhammad Said Ramadan al-Bouti)
- Al-Asīdah As-Samāwiyyah Sharh Al-Aqida al-Tahawiyya (the Arabic translation of the book Al-Asīdat as-Samāwiyyah Sharh al-Aqeeda al-Tahawiyyah, compiled by Muhammad Usman Bastawi, contains the statements of Mufti Radha ul Haq in two volumes.)
- Ad-Durrat al-Furda Sharh Qasīdat al-Burda (the Arabic translation of the book Ad-Durrat al-furda Sharh Qasīdat al-Burda, compiled by Owais Yaqūb Punjabi Godhravi and Muhammad Usman Bastawi, contains the statements of Mufti Radha ul Haq in two volumes.)
