= Al-Kifah =

Fortnightly Arabic Islamic magazine published by Jamiat Ulema-e-Hind

- Cover of the Rajab,1384 A.D. issue
- Subject: Islam
- Language: Arabic
- Edited by: Altafur Rahman Azmi

Publication details
- Publisher: Jamiat Ulema-e-Hind (India)

Standard abbreviations
- ISO 4: Al-Kifah

Al-Kifah (Arabic: الكفاح) was a fortnightly Arabic magazine, which was the mouthpiece of Jamiat Ulema-e-Hind. In the post-independence period, the leaders of Jamiat Ulema-i-Hind decided to launch the magazine to promote the aims and objectives of the Jamiat in the Gulf countries. For this purpose, an 8-page was published in Delhi in January 1973; its editor was Altafur Rahman Azmi. Wahiduzzaman Kairanawi played an important role in its publication. For some reason, the magazine was published for the last time in December 1987, but it had played a vital role in promoting Arabic language in India. Often the editors of Al-Da'i edited Al-Kifah, although Darul Uloom Deoband had no formal affiliation with it.

== Aims and objectives ==
Aims and objectives:

1. To introduce the aims of Jamiat-e-Ulama-e-Hind in the Arab countries.
2. To publish the events occurring here from the viewpoint of Jamiat.
3. To publish Islamic articles.
4. To endeavor to promote the Arabic language and literature in India.
