= Ahmed Khanpuri =

Indian mufti (born 1946)

Mufti Ahmed Khanpuri

Personal life
- Born: September 24, 1946 Khanpur Deh, Bharuch district, Bombay Presidency, British India (now in Gujarat, India)
- Main interest(s): Fiqh, Hadith, Tasawwuf
- Notable work(s): Maqmood al-Fatawa, Maqmood al-Mawaiz, Maqmood al-Rasail
- Education: Darul Uloom Deoband, Jamia Islamia Talimuddin
- Occupation: Islamic scholar, jurist, teacher
- Website: muftiahmedkhanpuri.com

Religious life
- Religion: Islam
- Denomination: Sunni Islam
- Movement: Deobandi

Muslim leader
- Disciple of: Mahmood Hasan Gangohi
- Influenced by: Mahmood Hasan Gangohi, Muhammad Zakariya Kandhlawi

YouTube information
- Channel: Mufti Ahmed Khanpuri
- Years active: 2015–present
- Genre: Islamic
- Subscribers: 29 thousand
- Views: 1.6 million
- Last updated: 24 October 2025

Ahmed Khanpuri (born 24 September 1946), also written as Ahmad Khanpuri, is an Indian Islamic scholar and jurist associated with the Deobandi movement. He is the senior Hadith professor (Sheikh al-Hadith) and head mufti at Jamia Islamia Talimuddin, Dabhel. He has authored several religious works and serves on the governing boards of Darul Uloom Deoband, Darul Uloom Nadwatul Ulama, and the Islamic Fiqh Academy, India.

== Early life and education ==
Ahmed Khanpuri was born on 27 Dhu al-Qa‘dah 1365 AH (24 September 1946) in Khanpur Deh, Bharuch district. His father, Muhammad Khanpuri, pledged allegiance (bay‘ah) to Hussain Ahmad Madani during a 1956 visit to Khanpur. Khanpuri met Madani on that occasion.

He received his early religious and modern education in Khanpur up to seventh grade. On 8 May 1958 (Shawwal 1377 AH), he enrolled at Darul Uloom Ashrafia, Rander, where he studied the Dars-i Nizami curriculum for over nine years and graduated in 1966 after completing the study of Hadith.

His teachers in Rander included Ahmad Raza Ajmeri, Saeed Ahmad Palanpuri, Abdul Ghani Kavi, Muhammad Adam Palanpuri, Habibullah Palanpuri, Habibur Rahman Balyawi, Muslihuddin Barodvi, Mohiuddin Qazi Randeri, and Muhammad Yusuf Budhaniya.

After graduation, he attempted to enter Darul Uloom Nadwatul Ulama but was unsuccessful. On the advice of Saeed Ahmad Palanpuri, he joined Darul Uloom Deoband in January 1967 (Shawwal 1386 AH) for advanced studies. He completed Takmil al-Funun and then Ifta studies there until 1968. His teachers at Deoband included Muhammad Tayyib Qasmi, Wahiduzzaman Kairanawi, Sharif Hasan Deobandi, Naseer Ahmad Khan, Muhammad Husain Bihari, Islamul Haq Azmi, Mahmood Hasan Gangohi, and Nizamuddin Azami.

== Spiritual affiliation ==
During his student days, Khanpuri pledged allegiance to Muhammad Zakariya Kandhlawi, who later authorized him in the Sufi order through Mahmood Hasan Gangohi. He received ijazah (authorization) for spiritual training and initiation from Gangohi and named his Sufi lodge Khanqah Mahmoodiyyah in his honor. His major work of fatwas, Maqmood al-Fatawa, and his residential area Mahmood Nagar are also named after Gangohi.

== Career ==
Following his studies, Khanpuri began teaching at Jamia Islamia Talimuddin, Dabhel in January 1969 on the instruction of Muhammad Zakariya Kandhlawi. He advanced through various teaching levels and joined the senior faculty in 1974. He has taught several major Hadith texts including Mishkat al-Masabih, Muwatta Imam Malik, Sunan Ibn Majah, Sunan Abi Dawud, Jami‘ al-Tirmidhi, and Sahih al-Bukhari.

He has served as librarian for five years, and as head of the education department for about a decade. In 1986 (Shawwal 1406 AH), he was appointed chief mufti of the institution. His collection of legal opinions has been published in eight volumes under the title Maqmood al-Fatawa, also translated into Gujarati in five volumes.

His notable students include Ebrahim Desai, Abbas Dawood Bismillah, and Mahmood Sulaiman Bardoli.

Since 2012 (1433 AH), Khanpuri has been a member of the Darul Uloom Deoband governing council. He is also a member of the administrative board of Darul Uloom Nadwatul Ulama, the All India Muslim Personal Law Board, and the Islamic Fiqh Academy, India.

According to the online fatwa portal Askimam, Khanpuri has a official website, named muftiahmedkhanpuri.com.

== Writings ==
Although not primarily a writer, Khanpuri's works include compilations of his lectures, sermons, and legal opinions, often edited by his disciples. These include:

- Mabadiyat al-Hadith ala Nahj Muqaddimat Mishkat al-Masabih (compiled by Mahmood Bardoli)
- Tashil al-Siraji (on Kitab al-Fara’id al-Sirajiyyah)
- Hadith ke Islahi Mazamin (15 volumes)
- Fathullah al-Ahad bi-Tawdih al-Adab al-Mufrad (Urdu explanation of Al-Adab al-Mufrad)
- Maktubat-e-Faqihul Ummat Ba-naam Mufti Ahmad Khanpuri (Letters written by Mahmood Hassan Gangohi to Khanpuri)
- Mahmood al-Fatawa (8 vols)
- Mahmood al-Mawaiz (4 vols)
- Mahmood al-Rasail (10 treatises, compiled by Abdul Qayyum Rajkoti)
- Mahmood al-Makāteeb (the first volume of his collection of letters, compiled by Nadeem Ahmed Ansari)

He also participated in the Urdu translation of Fatawa Rahimiyyah from Gujarati as part of a three-member committee. Additionally, he has contributed regularly to Gujarati-language journals such as Insan, Hayat, and Iblagh.

== See also ==
- Jamia Islamia Talimuddin
- Darul Uloom Deoband
- Deobandi movement
- Mahmood Hasan Gangohi
