= Al-Daie =

Monthly Arabic Islamic journal published by Darul Uloom Deoband

- Cover of the December, 2021 issue
- Subject: Islam
- Language: Arabic
- Edited by: Arif Jameel Mubarakpuri

Publication details
- Publisher: Darul Uloom Deoband (India)

Standard abbreviations
- ISO 4: Al-Da'i

Indexing
- ISSN: 2347-8950

Links
- Journal homepage

Al-Da'i (Arabic: الداعي) is an Arabic monthly Islamic journal issued from Darul Uloom Deoband, under the editorship of Wahiduzzaman Kairanawi in 1976. The main focus of the journal are dignitaries of Darul Uloom Deoband and its graduates only. Due to its uniqueness, it has attracted the attention of scholars from India and the Arab world. The journal is curated by Abul Qasim Nomani and Arif Jameel Mubarakpuri is the Editor-in-Chief. Noor Alam Khalil Amini was a notable editor of this journal.

== Reception ==
Qasim Yusuf al-Shaykh, an Islamic scholar from Bahrain, praised the magazine, saying that, "We are immensely happy to read some issues of your excellent Islamic papers where we have found the spirit of Islam and an enlightening thought of belief. We became more happy when we found articles about Muhammad Tayyib Qasmi, the head of Islamic University at Deoband and other great reformers."
