= Syed Anwarul Haq Haqqi =

Indian academic

- Born: 22 January 1922; Hardoi, United Provinces of British India
- Died: 10 February 2010 (aged 88)
- Citizenship: British India; India
- Relatives: Abrarul Haq Haqqi (brother)

Academic background
- Education: University of Lucknow; Aligarh Muslim University; London School of Economics
- Doctoral advisor: Mohammad Habib

Academic work
- Notable works: Indian democracy at the crossroads

Syed Anwarul Haq Haqqi (also known as S. A. H. Haqqi; 22 January 1922 – 10 February 2010) was an Indian scholar who headed the Political Science department of Aligarh Muslim University for twenty years. He was the younger brother of Abrarul Haq Haqqi.

== Biography ==
Syed Anwarul Haq Haqqi was born on 22 January 1922 in Hardoi. He received a B.A. degree from University of Lucknow and an M.A in History from Aligarh Muslim University (AMU). He wrote his doctoral thesis on Timur under the supervision of Mohammad Habib. He wrote a second doctoral thesis on "The British Colonial Policy" at the London School of Economics.

Haqqi served as the head professor of AMU's Political Science department for twenty years, where he initiated the Indian Journal of Politics as a departmental journal in 1967. He retired from AMU in 1982, and later taught at University of Warsaw, Middle East Technical University and the University of Kashmir as a visiting professor.

Haqqi's elder brother Abrarul Haq Haqqi was an Islamic scholar who established the Ashraful Madaris in Hardoi.

Haqqi died on 10 February 2010.

== Publications ==
Haqqi wrote Chingiz Khan: The life and Legacy of an Empire Builder, which according to David O. Morgan was "his first major venture into the history of medieval Asia". His other works include:

- Indian democracy at the crossroads
- The Union-State relations in India
- Secularism under siege : the Ayodhya tragedy in retrospect and prospect
- Democracy, Pluralism and Nation-Building
- The Turkish Impact on India the First Phase
- The Atatürk Revolution and India
- The Faith Movement of Mawlānā Muḥammad Ilyās
- The colonial policy of the Labour Government
- Problems of representation in the new states
- Machiavelli and Machiavellism (Urdu)
