= Hidayatul Quran =

Urdu Tafsir by Saeed Ahmad Palanpuri

- The first page of Hidayatul Quran
- Author: Muhammad Usman Kashif Hashmi; Saeed Ahmad Palanpuri
- Original title: ہدایت القرآن
- Genre: Quranic exegesis
- Publisher: Maktabatul Hijaz
- Publication date: 2016
- Publication place: India
- Media type: Hard Cover
- Dewey Decimal: 297.1227

Hidāyat al-Qurān (Urdu: ہدایت القرآن, lit. 'The guidance of the Qur'an') is a classical Sunni tafsir, begun by Muhammad Usman Kashif Hashmi who completed the Tafsir of Juz' 1–9, and completed after his death by Saeed Ahmad Palanpuri in 2016. It was published in 8 volumes by Maktabatul Hijaz. Some of Palanpuri's students made a translation into Bengali which was published in 2021 by Maktabatul Medina.

== Methodology ==
The author employed a uniform method of writing throughout the tafsir. Below the Quranic verses, he systematically provided the Urdu translations of Arabic words. This is followed by commentary, in which he identifies whether the surah is Makki or Madani, states the number of verses and rukus, and lists the principal topics in sequential order, each accompanied by a brief explanation to facilitate understanding. Important points are underlined, and separate headings are occasionally inserted to organize the content. At the conclusion of major surahs and smaller surahs, key points are summarized in bold script to aid memorization. The sources consulted during the composition of the tafsir are frequently cited, often including excerpts from the original Arabic texts, with references noted at the bottom of the pages.

== See also ==
- List of tafsir works
- List of Sunni books
