= Abrarul Haq Haqqi =

Indian Sunni Muslim scholar

Mohius Sunnah Abrarul Haq Haqqi

Personal life
- Born: 20 December 1920 Hardoi, UP, British India
- Died: 17 May 2005 (aged 84) Hardoi, Uttar Pradesh, India
- Era: Modern
- Education: Mazahir Uloom, Saharanpur
- Relatives: Syed Anwarul Haq Haqqi (brother)

Religious life
- Religion: Islam
- Denomination: Sunni
- Founder of: Ashraful Madaris
- Jurisprudence: Hanafi
- Movement: Deobandi

Muslim leader
- Disciples: Harun Islamabadi, Mahmudul Hasan, Qamruddin Ahmad Gorakhpuri, Abdur Rahman, Hakeem Muhammad Akhtar, Ubaidul Haq, Muhibbullah Babunagari, Mizanur Rahman Sayed, Abdul Quddus, Abul Hasan Azmi
- Influenced by: Ashraf Ali Thanwi

Abrarul Haq Haqqi (20 December 1920 — 17 May 2006) was an Indian Sunni Muslim scholar who established Ashraful Madaris in Hardoi. He was a disciple of Ashraf Ali Thanwi.

== Biography ==
Haqqi was born on 20 December 1920 in Hardoi. He graduated from Mazahir Uloom.

Haqqi was appointed a teacher in Mazahir Uloom after his graduation. He later taught at Jami-ul-Uloom Kanpur, a seminary in Kanpur, for two years. At Ashraf Ali Thanwi's suggestion, he taught at Madrasa Islamia Fatehpur for two years. In 1942, he established Ashraful Madaris in Hardoi at the suggestion of Ashraf Ali Thanwi. Since, he was also a Sufi mentor, he authorized 103 disciples.

Haqqi died on 17 May 2006.

== Legacy ==
At Aligarh Muslim University (AMU), Ateequr Rahman Qasmi wrote a doctoral thesis entitled Maulana Abrarul Haq: Life and Works. His brother Syed Anwarul Haq Haqqi headed the Political Science department of AMU for two decades.

== See also ==
- List of Deobandis
