= Abul Qasim Nomani =

Indian Muslim scholar

Sheikh al-Hadith, Mufti Abul Qasim Nomani
- ابوالقاسم نعمانی

13th Vice Chancellor of Darul Uloom Deoband
- Incumbent
- Assumed office 24 July 2011
- Preceded by: Ghulam Mohammad Vastanvi

10th Sheikh al-Hadith of Darul Uloom Deoband
- Incumbent
- Assumed office 14 October 2020
- Preceded by: Saeed Ahmad Palanpuri

Personal life
- Born: Abul Qasim; 14 January 1947 (age 79) Benares, Benares State, British India
- Education: Darul Uloom Deoband; Darul Uloom Mau; Jamia Miftahul Uloom

Religious life
- Religion: Islam
- Denomination: Sunni
- Jurisprudence: Hanafi
- Creed: Maturidi

Muslim leader
- Disciple of: Mahmood Hasan Gangohi

Abul Qasim Nomani (born 14 January 1947) is an Indian Islamic scholar associated with the Deobandi movement. He has served as the Vice-Chancellor (mohtamim) of Darul Uloom Deoband since 2011 and was appointed Sheikh al-Hadith of the institution in 2020. He is also a member of its governing body (Majlis-e-Shura) and has served as a vice-president of Jamiat Ulama-e-Hind.

== Early life and education ==
Abul Qasim Nomani was born in Madanpura, Banaras (Varanasi), on 14 January 1947 (22 Safar 1366 AH).

After receiving his early religious education at home, he enrolled in 1956 at Jamia Islamia, Madanpura (Banaras), where he studied from the second primary grade up to the fifth grade and also learned Persian and elementary Arabic. He then studied at Darul Uloom Mau, where he completed studies in Persian and Arabic up to the second level.

In 1961, he studied Arabic (third level) at Miftahul Uloom, Mau. In 1962, he enrolled at Darul Uloom Deoband for the fourth year of Arabic studies and graduated in 1967 after completing the hadith course (Dawra-e Hadith), securing first position. His teachers in the Dars-i Nizami curriculum at Deoband seminary included Syed Fakhruddin Ahmad, Ibrahim Balyawi, Muhammad Tayyib Qasmi, Fakhrul Hasan Moradabadi, Sharif Hasan Deobandi, Mirajul Haq Deobandi, and Naseer Ahmad Khan.

After completing his studies, he spent a year training in ifta (jurisprudence and fatwa writing) under scholars such as Mahmood Hasan Gangohi and Nizamuddin Azami.

== Career ==
After completing his education, Nomani began his teaching career in January 1969 at Jamia Islamia, Reori Talab, Banaras (Varanasi), where he served for about 43 years until December 2010 (Muharram 1432 AH), holding positions such as Shaykh al-Hadith and chief mufti. During his tenure there, he also served as the editor-in-chief of the quarterly journal Tarjuman al-Islam, published by the institution.

Following the death of Marghoobur Rahman, he was appointed acting Vice-Chancellor (kārguzār mohtamim) of Darul Uloom Deoband on 8 December 2010 (1 Muharram 1432 AH) for a short period. He was again appointed acting Vice-Chancellor on 23 February 2011 (19 Rabiʿ al-Awwal 1432 AH), and on 23 July 2011 (11 Shaʿban 1432 AH), following Ghulam Mohammad Vastanvi, he was formally appointed as Vice-Chancellor of the institution.

In 1992 (1413 AH), he became a member of the Governing Body (Majlis-e-Shura) of Darul Uloom Deoband and remained a member until his appointment as vice chancellor; thereafter, he has continued as a member in that capacity. He has also been a member of the working committee of Jamiat Ulama-e-Hind and was appointed its vice-president in 2008 (1429 AH).

On 14 October 2020, he succeeded Saeed Ahmad Palanpuri as Sheikh al-Hadith of the institution and was assigned to teach Sahih al-Bukhari (first volume); prior to this, he had been teaching Jami' al-Tirmidhi.

In March 2015, at a meeting of the Rabta-e-Madaris-e-Islamia, an organisation of madrasas affiliated with Darul Uloom Deoband which he headed, he advised that affiliated madrasas decline government financial assistance for modernisation.

In September 2015, he was included among the Swachh Bharat Abhiyan ambassadors and attended a meeting hosted by President Pranab Mukherjee at Rashtrapati Bhavan.

In April 2020, during the COVID-19 pandemic in India, he stated that Darul Uloom Deoband had issued guidelines for Ramadan advising Muslims to offer prayers, including taraweeh, at home and avoid large gatherings in mosques in accordance with government restrictions.

In October 2025, at Darul Uloom Deoband, Afghanistan's foreign minister Amir Khan Muttaqi attended a hadith lesson under his supervision and was subsequently granted a hadith sanad (authorization to teach).

=== Recognition ===
He has been listed in The 500 Most Influential Muslims, an annual publication by the Royal Islamic Strategic Studies Centre.

== Spiritual lineage ==
Nomani was initially initiated (bayʿah) by Muhammad Zakariya Kandhlawi, who subsequently placed him under the spiritual guidance of his khalifa, Mahmud Hasan Gangohi. He later completed his spiritual training under Gangohi and, on 1 June 1985, became his authorised disciple (khalifa) in Sufism.

== Works ==
Nomani does not have independent authored works; however, collections of his lectures and sermons have been published under the following titles:

- Al-Taqrir al-Marzi li-Hall Sunan al-Tirmidhi (a collection of his lectures on Jami' al-Tirmidhi)
- Khutbat-i Nomani (a collection of his sermons and speeches, in three volumes)
- Asbaq-i Hadith (2 volumes)
- Maqalat-i Nomani
- Muhasaba-yi Nafs ma‘ Haqiqat-i Muraqaba
- Wudu aur Namaz ki Amali Mashq
- Ahle-e-Sunnat aur Jamā'at-e-Ahle Hadees ke Mā-bain Ikhtilāf-e-Manhaj o Fikr
