= Abdul Khaliq Madrasi =

Indian Islamic scholar (b. 1953)

Mawlana Abdul Khaliq Madrasi

Deputy Vice Chancellor of Darul Uloom Deoband
- Incumbent
- Assumed office 1997
- Preceded by: Habibur Rahman Khairabadi

Personal life
- Born: 10 March 1953 (age 73) Jadwal, Arcot, Madras State, India (now Arcot, Ranipet district, Tamil Nadu, India)
- Main interest: Arabic literature
- Education: Madrasa Baqiyat Salihat; Darul Uloom Sabilur Rashad, Benglore; Darul Uloom Deoband
- Occupation: Islamic scholar

Religious life
- Religion: Islam
- Denomination: Sunni Islam
- Jurisprudence: Hanafi
- Creed: Maturidi
- Movement: Deobandi

Muslim leader
- Teacher: Syed Fakhruddin Ahmad; Naseer Ahmad Khan; Wahiduzzaman Kairanawi

Abdul Khaliq Madrasi (born 10 March 1953) is an Indian Islamic scholar. He is a professor of Hadith and deputy vice chancellor of Darul Uloom Deoband. He has also been doing teaching, administrative, and construction services there for almost half a century.

== Early life and education ==
Abdul Khaliq Madrasi was born on 10 March 1953 in Jadwal, Arcot, Madras State, India.

He received his primary education in the Quran, Urdu, mathematics, and theology at Madrasa Imdad al-Muslimeen, Jadwal, and English, mathematics, geography, and other modern sciences at Lillah Madrasa, Virinchipuram, Tamil Nadu.

After that, he studied Persian in 1961 at Madrasa Baqiyat Salihat, and in 1963 he started his Arabic studies at Darul Uloom Sabīl al Rashad, Bangalore. In Darul Uloom Sabīl al-Rashad, he also studied seven and ten qira'ates from Azhar Hasan Amrohvi.

In 1969, he was enrolled at Darul Uloom Deoband and graduated from there in the same year. He studied Sahih al-Bukhari with Syed Fakhruddin Ahmad. His other teachers in Darul Uloom Deoband also include Naseer Ahmad Khan.

After graduation, he completed Arabic literature in 1970, logic in 1971, and graduated from there in 1972–73. From 1970 until 1974, he worked hard and practiced with Wahiduzzaman Kairanawi in Arabic literature.

== Career ==
In August 1973, Madrasi was appointed as a teacher at Darul Uloom Deoband. He has taught books such as Tafsir al-Jalalayn, Mishkat al-Masabih, Al-Qira‘at al-Wāzihah, Tareekh-ul-Adab Al-Arabi (of al-Zayyat), Al-Mutanabbi's Dīwān and Ash-Shama'il al-Muhammadiyya, and the teaching of the latter two is still relevant to him.

Since 1987, he has been the director of the construction department of Darul Uloom Deoband. His architectural prowess and creative flair can be seen in the stunning Mosque Jami' Rashid at Darul Uloom, the tall Sheikh-ul-Hind Library, and other contemporary structures.

Since 1997 (1418 AH), he has been serving as the Deputy Vice-Chancellor of Dar Uloom Deoband.

== Views ==
=== Yoga ===
Madrasi believes that Muslims who practice yoga are getting a good form of exercise. If some words, which are supposed to be chanted while performing them, have religious connotations, then Muslims need not utter those. They can instead recite verses from the Quran, praise Allah, or remain silent.

=== Homosexuality ===
Madrasi considers homosexuality an offense under Shari‘a law, and thus haram [prohibited] in Islam. He criticised the Delhi High Court decision of de-criminalising homosexuality and observed that it would corrupt Indian boys and girls.

=== Politics ===
Madrasi issued a statement on behalf of Darul Uloom Deoband regarding the harm done to places of worship as a result of roads or construction, stating that if any place of worship, regardless of religion, is disturbed, Darul Uloom will take the problem seriously.

In his perspective, the Uniform Civil Code will be divisive and cause societal upheaval. It violates the spirit of the Constitution, which guarantees every citizen the right to exercise his or her religion.
