= Barabasti =

Barahbasti
- village
- Country: India
- State: Uttar Pradesh
- District: Bulandshahr

Languages
  - Official: Hindi
  - Additional official: Urdu
- Time zone: UTC+5:30 (IST)
- Nearest city: Bulandshahr

Barabasti or BarahBasti initially had a group of 12 villages but later it exceeds and now they are more than 12 lying in Bulandshahr district in the Indian state of Uttar Pradesh. These villages are located adjacent to each other within an area of seven square miles, and noted for a high population of Pathans, in addition to other Muslims and Hindus.

== Villages ==
The name "Barabasti" is derived from the term "Barah Basti", 12 villages and town of Pathans which in Hindustani means "twelve settlements". The twelve villages, now under the districts of Bulandshahr, Ghaziabad and Amroha, are Basi, Giroura, Bugrasi, Jalalpur, Chandiyana, Gesupur, Barwala, Amarpur, Sherpur, Bahadurgarh, Mohammadpur, Khanpur, Daulatpur Kalan. The naming of the "twelve villages" in Hindustani was similar to the naming of the Sadaat-e-Bara of Muzaffarnagar.

== History ==
In the town of Sikandarabad in Bulandshahr, the leader of the rebels was Walidad Khan who held the fort of Malagarh. His levies were drawn from disaffected Hindus as well as the Indian Pathans of Erstwhile Khanpur Estate the headquarter of Barah Basti village's of Bulandshahr District.

There were three family members from Khanpur estate who took significant part in the Great uprising of 1857 at Bulandshahar District.

Azim Khan alias Azam Khan was the deputy of Nawab Walidad Khan of Malagarh in the Bulandshahr district of the former United Provinces. The family-owned the erstwhile Khanpur estate [Taluqdar] in the same district.

During the Great Uprising of 1857, Nawab Walidad Khan who was related the Mughal emperor, Bahadur Shah Zafar by virtue of marriage within their family, was chosen as the leader of this movement to overthrow the colonial government.

When on 10 October 1857 the British forces attacked Malagarh, Azim Khan put up a stiff resistance under the overall command of Nawab Walidad Khan at Khurja and completely paralysed the British for a few days. He was finally arrested while crossing the Ganga to move into Rohilkhand by Khusi Ram, the Police Officer of Anupshahr. He was tried by a court martial and subsequently hanged.

Haji Munir Khan was the only son of Azim Khan, the landlord of the Khanpur estate in Bulandshahr district. Munir Khan was the main commander of the revolutionaries of the Bulandshahr district during the Great Uprising of 1857.

In the famous second battle of Gulaothi which was fought on 29 July 1857 the British forces wanted to take control over the whole of the Bulandshahr district. To stop their advance, Nawab Walidad Khan of Malagarh deputed his main commanders Haji Munir Khan and Ismail Khan to Gulaothi. Both of them established a picket on the canal just before Gulaothi to stop the colonial force from entering the Bulandshahr district. Both Haji Munir Khan and Ismail Khan got severe sword cuts on their faces.

Later on, Haji Munir Khan crossed the Ganga with Walidad Khan and joined Khan Bahadur Khan's forces and fought at Kachhla ghat. He continued fighting until his last breath.

Abdul Latif Khan who was the nephew of Azim Khan, the landlord of the Khanpur's estate in the Bulandshahr district. Abdul Latif Khan was the second wealthiest landholder in the district and the proprietor of 225 villages, and its headquarters of the Barah Basti villages.

During the Great Uprising of 1857, the District Magistrate of Bulanshahr called upon all the principal landholders of the district, including Abdul Latif Khan, to aid by furnishing troops to suppress the revolt.

Abdul Latif Khan initially refused to help the British, but when on 4 October 1857, Bulandshahr had been occupied by the British force under Lieutenant Colonel Farquhar, he paid up his balances of land revenue, but soon shifted his allegiance to Bahadur Shah Zafar.

Though he never came to the battlefield Abdul Latif Khan gave shelter to revolutionaries of Bulandshahr district including Nawul Gujjar, Raheemoddeen, and Pathan of Barah Basti villages when they were engaged in fighting the British forces. For his acts, he was tried by a military court and sentenced to transportation for life to Andamans or kala pani for aiding the revolt of 1857.

The family's erstwhile Khanpur estate in Bulandshahr district was subsequently confiscated by the British after the 1857 uprising was crushed by the colonial forces

== Transport ==
Barahbasti is about 100 km from Delhi. Barabasti can be reached by road in a two-hour drive from Delhi.

== Economy ==
The economy of this area is based on agriculture. Barahbasti has many mango orchards, many varieties of mangoes are grown here like Dusseri, Bombayi, ChauLangda, Gulab-Jamun, Ratol Fajri. You can find More than 100s varieties of mangoes in Barahbasti which are limited for their personal taste. The area supplies a large number of mangoes to the country, and has been declared fruit belt by the government of Uttar Pradesh. Hundreds of trucks loaded with mangoes go to various places including Azadpur Mandi (fruit market) in Delhi, and some of best mangoes are exported to Gulf and European markets.

== Demographics ==
Barabasti has a mix of Muslims and Hindus. However, it is noted for its relatively large Pathan population.

== Notable people ==
- Arif Mohammad Khan, from Barwala. Governor of bihar, former Civil Aviation Minister in the Indian Central Government, a two-time Member of Parliament (MP) and a three-time MLA. Governor of Kerala
