= Qamruddin Ahmad Gorakhpuri =

Indian Islamic scholar (1938–2024)

Allama, Mawlana Qamruddin Ahmad Gorakhpuri

Personal life
- Born: 2 February 1938 Barhalganj, United Provinces, British India
- Died: 22 December 2024 (aged 86) Deoband, Uttar Pradesh, India
- Resting place: Qasmi Cemetery
- Education: Ihyaul Uloom Mubarakpur; Darul Uloom Mau; Darul Uloom Deoband
- Occupation: Islamic scholar

Religious life
- Religion: Islam
- Denomination: Sunni
- Jurisprudence: Hanafi
- Creed: Maturidi
- Movement: Deobandi

Muslim leader
- Teacher: Hussain Ahmad Madani; Syed Fakhruddin Ahmad; Ibrahim Balyawi

Qamruddin Ahmad Gorakhpuri (2 February 1938 – 22 December 2024) was an Indian Islamic scholar, Hadith professor, and Sheikh. He served as a teacher at Darul Uloom Deoband from 1966 until his death in 2024. He was an authorized disciple of Abrarul Haq Haqqi in Sufism.

== Early life and education ==
Qamruddin Ahmad Gorakhpuri was born on 2 February 1938, in Barhalganj, Gorakhpur district, Uttar Pradesh.

He received his early and intermediate education at Ihyaul Uloom Mubarakpur and Darul Uloom Mau. He enrolled in Darul Uloom Deoband in 1954 and graduated from the Hadith course in 1957.

Gorakhpuri studied Sahih al-Bukhari with Hussain Ahmad Madani and Syed Fakhruddin Ahmad; Sahih Muslim and Jami' al-Tirmidhi with Ibrahim Balyawi; Sunan an-Nasai with Bashir Ahmad Khan Bulandshahri; Sunan Abi Dawood with Fakhrul Hasan Muradabadi; Shama'il at-Tirmidhi with Abdul Ahad Deobandi; Sharh Ma'ani al-Athar with Syed Hasan Deobandi; Sunan Ibn Majah and Muwatta Imam Malik with Zahoor Ahmad Deobandi; and Muwatta Imam Muhammad with Jaleel Ahmad Kiranwi. During the year he studied Sahih al-Bukhari with Husain Ahmad Madani, Madani died, and Syed Fakhruddin Ahmad completed the remainder of the course.

He stayed an additional year at Darul Uloom Deoband, including the year of studying Hadith, and studied books on various sciences.

Gorakhpuri initially sought spiritual guidance in Sufism from Shah Wasiullah Illahabadi, and after Wasiullah's death, he pledged allegiance to Abrarul Haq Haqqi, from whom he received authorization in Sufism. He was also authorized in Sufism by Ibrahim Balyawi, Siddique Ahmad Bandwi, and Mahmud Saharanpuri.

== Career ==
After completing his education, Gorakhpuri taught at Madrasa Abdur Rab, Delhi from 1959 to 1967, on the advice of his teacher, Ibrahim Balyawi. During this time, he also taught esteemed books like Sahih al-Bukhari and delivered Quranic exegesis (Tafsir) at a major mosque in Delhi.

Through the recommendation of Ibrahim Balyawi, Gorakhpuri was appointed a teacher at Darul Uloom Deoband in 1386 AH (1966 CE). He progressed steadily in his career, and in 1399 AH (1979 CE), he was promoted to the higher teaching ranks. He had been associated with the teaching of Sahih Muslim and Sunan Nasai, and taught the second volume of Sahih Bukhari and Surah Saffat from Tafsir Ibn Kathir until his death.

He served as Warden of Darul Uloom Deoband twice, first in 1970 and again from 1974 to 1980. During Naseer Ahmad Khan's principalship, he served as the administrator of the Academic Faculty from 1989 to 1995.

== Literary works ==
Although Gorakhpuri did not author any books, his sermons delivered at the Jama Masjid Hashim in Ambur, Tamil Nadu, were published in a volume titled Jawahirāt-e-Qamar.

== Death ==
Gorakhpuri died in Deoband, Saharanpur district, Uttar Pradesh on 22 December 2024, at the age of 86. He was laid to rest in Qasmi Cemetery after his funeral prayer was offered on the same day at Maulsiri compound in the afternoon.

== See also ==
- List of Deobandis
