= Fakhrul Hasan Moradabadi =

Indian Islamic scholar (1905–1980)

Mawlana Fakhrul Hasan Moradabadi

8th Principal of Darul Uloom Deoband
- In office 1972–1980
- Preceded by: Syed Fakhruddin Ahmad
- Succeeded by: Mirajul Haq Deobandi

Personal life
- Born: 8 September 1905 Umri, Moradabad district, British India
- Died: 17 September 1980 (aged 75) Deoband, Uttar Pradesh, India
- Notable work(s): Al-Tafsir al-Hawi, Hayat Imam al-Tahawi
- Education: Darul Uloom Deoband
- Known for: Teaching Sahih Muslim and Tafsir al-Baydawi
- Occupation: Islamic scholar, muhaddith, teacher

Religious life
- Religion: Islam
- Denomination: Sunni Islam
- Creed: Maturidi

Muslim leader
- Disciple of: Abdul Qadir Raipuri
- Influenced by: Abdul Qadir Raipuri; Hussain Ahmad Madani

Fakhrul Hasan Moradabadi (Urdu: فخر الحسن مرادآبادی; 1905–1980) was a 20th-century Indian Islamic scholar and teacher associated with Darul Uloom Deoband. He served as the Sadr al-Mudarrisin (Principal) of the seminary from 1972 until his death. He was known for his teachings in hadith and Quranic exegesis, especially his lessons on Sahih Muslim and Tafsir al-Baydawi.

== Early life and education ==
Fakhrul Hasan Moradabadi was born on 10 Rajab 1323 AH (8 September 1905) in the village of Umri in Moradabad district. His chronogrammatic name was Mazhar Husain. He received his early education in Quranic recitation, theology, Urdu, and Persian under Nasimuddin and Abdul Qadir Amrohi. His father was the librarian at the Madrasa Shahi in Moradabad, where Moradabadi was admitted around 1335 AH (1917 CE).

He studied intermediate texts at Mazahir Uloom Saharanpur and then enrolled at Darul Uloom Deoband in 1343 AH (1925 CE), graduating in 1347 AH (1929 CE) after completing the Dars-e-Nizami curriculum and the study of hadith.

He remained in Deoband for about seven to eight years, studying the full range of texts included in the Dars-e-Nizami curriculum from beginning to end.

During his student years in Deoband, he was known for his diligence and quick understanding. In accordance with the seminary's traditions, he also assisted fellow students by revising lessons with them.

== Career ==
After graduating from Darul Uloom Deoband in 1347 AH (1929 CE), Moradabadi began his teaching career at Madrasa-e-Aliya, Fatehpuri Mosque in Delhi. He later taught selected texts of the Sihah Sittah at Madrasa Shams al-Huda in Patna for a short period, before returning to Fatehpuri where he eventually became the head teacher.

In 1362 AH (1943 CE), he joined the faculty of Darul Uloom Deoband as a teacher of advanced texts. His lessons on Sahih Muslim and Tafsir al-Baydawi gained recognition for their clarity and depth. The lecture notes from his classes on Tafsir al-Baydawi were later compiled and published under the title Al-Tafsir al-Hawi.

In 1387 AH (1972 CE), following the death of Syed Fakhruddin Ahmad, he was appointed as the Sadr al-Mudarrisin (Principal) of Darul Uloom Deoband. He held this position until his death in 1980. He also served as a member of the seminary’s governing council (Majlis-e-Shura) from 1972 to 1981.

He was known for his strong command of Arabic, logic, and Islamic philosophy, and consistently taught upper-level texts in hadith, tafsir, philosophy, and literature. Students appreciated his ability to simplify complex subjects through clear exposition, articulate delivery, and a friendly demeanor.

He also received spiritual training and khilafah (authorization) in the Chishti-Sabiri Sufi tradition from Abdul Qadir Raipuri.

== Death ==
Moradabadi died on the night of 7 Dhu al-Qa'dah 1400 AH (17 September 1980 CE) in Deoband, following a prolonged illness. He was buried in the Mazar-e-Qasmi graveyard, located within the campus of Darul Uloom Deoband.

== Works ==
- Al-Tafsir al-Hawi – commentary on Tafsir al-Baydawi
- Hayat Imam al-Tahawi – biographical work on Imam al-Tahawi
