= Abdul Qadir Raipuri =

Scholar in British India (1878–1962)

Shah Abdul Qadir Raipuri

Personal life
- Born: 1878 Toha Moharram Khan, Punjab Province, British India
- Died: 13 August 1962 (aged 83–84)
- Resting place: Sargodha, Punjab, Pakistan

Religious life
- Religion: Islam

Muslim leader
- Influenced by: Shah Abdul Rahim Raipuri
- Influenced: Shah Abdul Aziz Raipuri Shah Saeed Ahmed Raipu Abul Hasan Ali Nadwi, [[Iftikhar-ul-Hasan Kandhlawi][Hafiz Abdul Hakim]]

Shah Abdul Qadir Raipuri (1878 – 1962) was a scholar and reformer in the Deobandi tradition of Islam in British India and then Pakistan.

== Life ==
He was born in Toha Moharram Khan of Potohar of Chakwal District in British India. His father belonged to a religious Muslim Rajput family He lived with his aunt in Dhodiyal, Sargodha. She bequeathed him her lands. Her brothers were Mulana Muhammad Ahsan, Mulana Kaleemullah and Mulana Muhammad Yaseen.

He became a hafiz of the Quran under the supervision of his uncle, Maulana Kaleemullah. He learned Arabic grammar from Maulana Muhammad Rafiq, who was a student of Rashid Ahmad Gangohi. Thereafter, he left home to pursue Islamic studies. He studied in Saharanpur, Panipat and Delhi. He translated the Quran into Urdu in his later years.

In Delhi, he studied the books of hadith in Madrasa Abdur Rabb under Maulana Abd al-A’li in Delhi, who was a student of Hujjatul Islam Maulana Muhammad Qasim Nanotvi, as well as Sahih al-Tirmidhi from Anwar Shah Kashmiri. He spent 14 years with Shah Abdul Rahim Raipuri.

He traveled to Bareilly in Uttar Pradesh and conducted classes on the Qur'an and hadith. He taught his disciples the methods of the purification of the soul and Tasawuff. Many Muslim scholars studied under him. He authorized some students to teach and propagate Islam across India.

== See more ==
- List of Deobandis
