= Abdul Haq Azmi =

Indian Islamic scholar (1928 – 2016)

Shaykh Saani, Shaykh al-Hadith, Maulana Abdul Haq Azmi

Personal life
- Born: 1928 Jagdishpur, Azamgarh district, United Provinces, British India
- Died: 30 December 2016 (aged 88) Deoband, Uttar Pradesh, India
- Main interest: Hadith
- Education: Darul Uloom Deoband
- Occupation: Muhaddith
- Relatives: Rana Ayyub

Religious life
- Religion: Islam
- Denomination: Sunni
- Jurisprudence: Hanafi
- Creed: Maturidi
- Movement: Deobandi

Muslim leader
- Disciple of: Talha Kandhlawi
- Students: Noor Alam Khalil Amini, Salman Mansoorpuri, Salman Bijnori, Ishtiaque Ahmad Qasmi, Mohammad Najeeb Qasmi
- Influenced by: Hussain Ahmad Madani, Izaz Ali Amrohi

Abdul Haq Azmi (1928 – 30 December 2016) was an Indian Islamic scholar who was a senior professor of hadith at the Darul Uloom Deoband. He was an alumnus of Darul Uloom Mau and Darul Uloom Deoband.

== Biography ==
Abdul Haq Azmi was born on 17 December 1928 in Jagdishpur, Azamgarh. He attended local schools and then Madrasa Bayt al-Ulum in Sarai Mir, Azamgarh. He later studied at Darul Uloom Mau up to 7th grade of Arabic and then entered the Darul Uloom Deoband in 1373 AH (1953) and graduated in 1374 AH (1954) after studying with scholars Hussain Ahmad Madani, Izaz Ali Amrohi and Ibrahim Balyawi. He studied rational sciences with his stepfather Muslim Jaunpuri, who was a disciple of Majid Ali Jaunpuri. He was an authorized disciple of Talha Kandhlawi.

Azmi taught at the Mata'ul Uloom, Banaras for over sixteen years. As a mufti at Darul Uloom Mau for thirteen years, he issued nearly 13,000 rulings. He was later appointed as hadith teacher at the Darul Uloom Deoband in 1982 where he taught Mishkat al-Masabih and the second volume Sahih al-Bukhari. He taught Sahih al-Bukhari in the Darul Uloom Deoband for 34 years. His students included Mohammad Najeeb Qasmi, Mahmood Madani, Noor Alam Khalil Amini and Salman Mansoorpuri.

Azmi died on 30 December 2016 (30 Rabi' al-awwal 1438 AH) and was buried in the Qasmi cemetery of the Darul Uloom Deoband. His funeral prayer was led by Arshad Madani. He is survived by his wife and twelve children. His son Abdul Bar Azmi is Professor of Hadith in Madrasa Bayt al-Ulum Sarai Mir in Azamgarh.

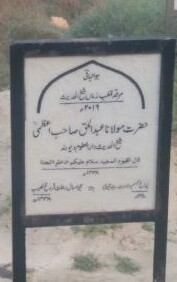
Grave inscription of Abdul Haque Azmi

== Personal life ==
Azmi was married to Muhammad Ayyub Waqif's maternal cousin sister, who is also the father of Indian journalist Rana Ayyub.

== See also ==
- List of Deobandis
