= Darul Uloom Mau =

Islamic seminary in Uttar Pradesh, India

Darul Uloom Mau, Uttar Pradesh
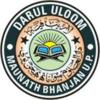
- Darul Uloom Logo
- Type: Islamic university
- Established: 1875
- Chancellor: Majlis-e-Shoora
- Vice-Chancellor: Zaki Naqshbandi
- Location: Qasim Pura, Mau, Uttar Pradesh, India; 22.36428°N 91.828123°E
- Website: http://darululoommau.in/

Darul Uloom Mau is an Islamic Madrasa which was established in Mau in 1875.

== Notable alumni ==
- Abdul Haq Azmi
- Abul Qasim Nomani
- Nizamuddin Asir Adrawi
- Habib Al-Rahman Al-Azmi
- Habibur Rahman Khairabadi
- Manzur Nu'mani
- Muhammad Mustafa Azmi
- Mujahidul Islam Qasmi
- Noor Alam Khalil Amini
- Qamruddin Ahmad Gorakhpuri

== See also ==
- Al-Jamiatul Asaria Darul Hadees
