= Saeed Ahmad Palanpuri =

Indian Mufti (1940 – 2020)

Shaykh al-Hadīth, Mufti Saeed Ahmad Palanpuri

11th Principal, Darul Uloom Deoband
- In office 2008 – 19 May 2020
- Preceded by: Naseer Ahmad Khan
- Succeeded by: Arshad Madani

9th Sheikh al-Hadith of Darul Uloom Deoband
- In office 2008 – 19 May 2020
- Preceded by: Naseer Ahmad Khan
- Succeeded by: Abul Qasim Nomani

Personal life
- Born: 1940 Kaleda, Palanpur State, British India
- Died: 19 May 2020 (aged 79–80) Mumbai, Maharashtra, India
- Notable work: Hidayatul Quran
- Education: Mazahir Uloom, Saharanpur; Darul Uloom Deoband

Religious life
- Religion: Islam
- Denomination: Sunni
- Movement: Deobandi

Muslim leader
- Students: Ahmed Khanpuri; Salman Mansoorpuri; Salman Bijnori; Ishtiaque Ahmad Qasmi; Yasir Nadeem al Wajidi; Mufti nizam sahab
- Awards: Presidential Certificate of Honour

Saeed Ahmad Palanpuri (also written as Saʻīd Aḥmad Pālanpūrī) (1940 – 19 May 2020), was an Indian Sunni Muslim scholar and author who served as Shaykh al-Hadith and Principal of Darul Uloom Deoband. Some of his books are required readings in Darul Uloom Deoband seminary.

== Biography ==
Palanpuri was born in 1940 in Kaleda village, Vadgam then in the Palanpur State. He studied at the Mazahir Uloom and then attended the Darul Uloom Deoband, where he graduated in traditional dars-e-nizami studies. His teachers included Muhammad Tayyib Qasmi, Syed Fakhruddin Ahmad, Ibrahim Balyawi, Mahdi Hasan Shahjahanpuri, and Naseer Ahmad Khan.

Palanpuri joined Jamia Ashrafiya in Rander as a teacher in 1965 and taught there for about ten years. He was appointed as a teacher of Darul Uloom Deoband in 1973 at the recommendation of Manzur Nu'mani. In 2008, he succeeded Naseer Ahmad Khan as Shaykh al-Hadith and also served as Principal. His teaching career in Darul Uloom Deoband lasted for over 50 years.

Pratibha Patil awarded Palanpuri the President's Certificate of Honour on the 64th Independence Day of India.

=== Reaction towards Madrasa Board scheme ===
Palanpuri maintained the view that the Indian Government's Scheme to Provide Quality Education in Madrasas (SPQEM) will end in fiasco.

== Literary works ==
Palanpuri's works include:

- Tuhfatul Qari
- Tafseer Hidayat al-Quran
- Mabadiyat-e-Fiqh
- Aap Fatwa Kaise Dein?
- Hurmat-e-Musahirat
- Dadhi awr Anbiya ki Sunnat
- Tehshiya Imdad al-Fatawa (Marginalia to Ashraf Ali Thanwi's 6 volume Imdad al-Fatawa).
- Tasheel Adilla-e-Kamilah (Commentary to Mahmud Hasan Deobandi's Adilla-e-Kamilah).
- Mashaheer Muhaddiseen, Fuqaha Kiram awr Tadhkirah Rawiyan-e-Kutb-e-Hadith
- Rahmatullahil Wasiah (5 volume commentary to Shah Waliullah Dehlawi's Hujjatullahil Balighah)
- Mahfuzat

== Death ==
Palanpuri had diabetes and was admitted to a Mumbai hospital, where he died on 19 May 2020 (25 Ramadan 1441 AH). He was buried in a graveyard located in Oshiwara, Mumbai and very few people were allowed to attend his last rites due to the Covid-19 lockdown. Islamic scholars Abul Qasim Nomani, Arshad Madani, Mehmood Madani and Muhammad Sufyan Qasmi expressed grief at his death.

== Bibliography ==
- Yazici, Ahmet (28 December 2021). "Hintli Âlim Müftî Saʿid Ahmed Palanpûrî'nin Nesih Anlayışı". Trabzon İlahiyat Dergisi (in Turkish). 8 (2). ISSN 2651-4559.
- Kaleem, Mohd (2017). Contribution of Old boys of Darul uloom Deoband in Hadith Literature (PhD) (in Urdu). India: Department of Sunni Theology, Aligarh Muslim University. pp. 151–153. hdl:10603/364028. Archived from the original on 24 October 2023.
- Pālanpuri, Muhammad Ameen (2020). Hayāt -e- Sa'eed [Life of Sa'eed] (in Urdu) (1 ed.). Maktaba al Hijāz, Deoband.
- Pālanpuri, Mustafa Ameen (July 2020). Hayāt -e- Sa'eed Ek Nazar Mein ['Hayat-e-Saeed' at a glance] (in Urdu) (1 ed.). Deoband: Dār-ul- irfān.
- Bijnori, Muhammad Salmān, ed. (June–July 2020). "Zikr-e-Sa'eed". Dārul Uloom Monthly (in Urdu). 104 (6–7). Maktaba Darul Uloom Deoband.
- Bijnori, Muhammad Salmān, ed. (August–September 2020). "Zikr-e-Sa'eed". Dārul Uloom Monthly (in Urdu). 104 (8–9). Maktaba Darul Uloom Deoband.
- Qāsmi, Muḥammadullah (October 2020). Darul Uloom Deoband ki Jami' wa Mukhtasar Tārīkh [A Brief and Summarized History of Darul Uloom Deoband] (in Urdu) (2 ed.). Deoband: Shaykhul Hind Academy. pp. 659–660. OCLC 1345466013.
