= Mirajul Haq Deobandi =

Indian Islamic scholar (1910–1991)

Mawlana Mirajul Haq Deobandi
- معراج الحق دیوبندی

9th Principal of Darul Uloom Deoband
- In office 1981–1991
- Preceded by: Fakhrul Hasan Moradabadi
- Succeeded by: Naseer Ahmad Khan

Deputy Vice-Chancellor of Darul Uloom Deoband
- In office 1966–1976
- Preceded by: Bashir Ahmad Khan
- Succeeded by: Naseer Ahmad Khan

Personal life
- Born: 1910 Mohalla Kotla, Deoband, United Provinces of Agra and Oudh, British India
- Died: 18 August 1991 (aged 80–81) Deoband, Uttar Pradesh, India
- Resting place: Qasmi Cemetery, Deoband
- Education: Darul Uloom Deoband, Mazahir Uloom Saharanpur
- Known for: Teaching al-Hidayah, Tafsir al-Baydawi, and classical Arabic poetry
- Occupation: Islamic scholar, teacher, administrator

Religious life
- Religion: Islam
- Denomination: Sunni Islam
- Creed: Maturidi

Muslim leader
- Disciple of: Wasiullah Fatehpuri
- Influenced by: Hussain Ahmad Madani; Muhammad Ibrahim Balyawi; Izaz Ali Amrohi; Wasiullah Fatehpuri

Mirajul Haq Deobandi (معراج الحق دیوبندی; 1910 – 18 August 1991), also transliterated as Merajul Haq Deobandi or Mairajul Haq Deobandi, was an Indian Islamic scholar associated with the Deobandi movement. He served at Darul Uloom Deoband for nearly five decades, including as principal and deputy vice-chancellor.

== Early life and education ==
Mirajul Haq Deobandi was born in 1910 (1328 AH) in the Kotla neighborhood of Deoband, India. His father, Munshi Nurul Haq, was a devout and pious individual who worked in Punjab at the time of his son's early education.

He received his primary education in Barnala, Punjab, where his father was posted. He later continued his middle-level education in Deoband and joined the Diniyat section of Darul Uloom Deoband, initially studying under scholars including Muhammad Yasin Deobandi. In 1345 AH, due to his father's transfer to Saharanpur, he enrolled in Mazahir Uloom Saharanpur, where he studied a wide array of subjects for approximately five years, including logic, grammar, jurisprudence, and Arabic literature.

In Rabi' al-Thani 1339 AH, he returned to Darul Uloom Deoband and resumed his studies. He completed the Dars-e-Nizami curriculum in stages and graduated in 1351 AH (1931 AD), having studied texts such as al-Hidayah, Tafsir al-Baydawi, Diwan al-Mutanabbi, and various works in hadith, philosophy, and rhetoric.

At Deoband, he studied under prominent scholars including Hussain Ahmad Madani, Muhammad Ibrahim Balyawi, Izaz Ali Amrohi, and Qari Muhammad Tayyib. He was especially influenced by his teacher Azaz Ali Amrohi, and was regarded among his selected students.

After graduating, he passed the Molvi Fazil examination from Panjab University with high distinction (First Division).

== Career ==
After completing his studies, Deobandi began his teaching career in 1934 (1353 AH) at Madrasa Hashimiyya, located in Zakaria Street, Bombay (now Mumbai), where he served until 1939 (1358 AH). This initial experience established his reputation as a capable teacher.

He later moved to southern India to serve at Madrasa Diniyah in Gulbarga, then part of Hyderabad Deccan (now in Karnataka), where he held dual responsibilities as head teacher and administrator. His success in both educational and administrative roles earned him the appreciation of his teachers and contemporaries.

In 1943 (1362 AH), he was invited to join the faculty of Darul Uloom Deoband, where he remained affiliated until his death in 1991. He dedicated nearly five decades of his life to teaching and academic administration at the seminary.

He was particularly known for his expertise in Islamic jurisprudence (fiqh), especially his teaching of the final volumes of al-Hidayah, which gained widespread recognition among students. He also taught classical Arabic literature, including texts such as Dīwan al-Hamasah and the Dīwan of al-Mutanabbi, offering detailed commentary on grammar, rhetoric, and pre-Islamic Arab culture. In the final years of his life, he also taught books of hadith, including Jami' at-Tirmidhi and Sunan Ibn Majah.

In addition to his teaching duties, he was appointed Deputy Vice-Chancellor (Naib Mohtamim) of Darul Uloom Deoband in 1966 (1386 AH), a position he held until 1976 (1396 AH). In 1981 (1401 AH), following the death of Fakhrul Hasan Moradabadi, he was appointed Principal of the Faculty, the highest academic position at the seminary, and served in that capacity until his death.

His administrative capabilities were widely recognized, and he was known for resolving students’ issues with diligence and care.

== Legacy ==
Over the course of nearly five decades, Deobandi taught a wide array of Islamic sciences including fiqh, Arabic literature, and hadith. Thousands of students benefited from his instruction, many of whom went on to become scholars and educators across the world.

Despite his administrative and academic responsibilities, he lived a simple and ascetic life. He remained unmarried and resided in a modest room within the Darul Uloom Deoband campus, dedicating himself wholly to teaching, institutional service, and student welfare. He considered the seminary not only his place of work, but also his home and spiritual center.

Deobandi was also a spiritual disciple of Wasiullah Fatehpuri, a senior Khalifa of Ashraf Ali Thanwi. He was known for his discipline, punctuality, and commitment to regular spiritual practices, particularly during the last portion of the night.

In recognition of his lifelong dedication, one of the main entrances of Darul Uloom Deoband was named the Miraj Gate in his honor.

== Death ==
Deobandi died on 18 August 1991 (7 Safar 1412 AH) at the age of 83. He had been in declining health for several months prior to his death. He died peacefully at Darul Uloom Deoband, the institution to which he had dedicated his entire adult life. His funeral was attended by numerous students, colleagues, and admirers, and he was buried in the Qasmi cemetery within the seminary grounds.
