= Wahiduzzaman Kairanawi =

Indian lexicographer (1930–1995)

Maulana Wahiduzzaman Kairanawi
- Born: 17 February 1930; Kairana, Muzaffarnagar district, United Provinces, British India (now Shamli district, Uttar Pradesh, India)
- Died: 15 April 1995 (aged 65); Delhi, India
- Resting place: Mazar-e-Qasmi, Deoband
- Education: Darul Uloom Deoband
- Occupations: Writer, Teacher, lexicographer
- Writing career
- Language: Urdu, Arabic
- Subject: Arabic literature
- Notable works: Al-Daie; Al Qamūs Al Wahīd; Al Qamūs Al Jadīd; Jawāhir ul Ma‘ārif; Al qirā’at ul wāziha

Wahīduzzamān Kairānawi (1930–1995), also spelt as Waheed-uz-Zaman Keranvi, was an Indian Islamic scholar, writer, lexicographer, and professor who specialised in Arabic. He spent around 27 years instructing Hadith and Arabic at Darul Uloom Deoband.

== Early life and education ==
Wahiduzzaman Kairanawi was born on 17 February 1930, in Kairana. He was a descendant of Abu Ayub Ansari, a companion of the Islamic Prophet Muhammad.

Kairanawi studied Hifz, Arabic, and Persian in Jama Masjid, Kairana from his father Masīhuzzamān and Muhammad Khalid, then accidentally went to Hyderabad for education in 1946, where he learned the Arabic language from an Arabic scholar, Mamūn Al-Dimashqi.

He was admitted to Darul Uloom Deoband in 1367 AH (1948 AD) and graduated from the Aalim course in 1371 AH (1952 AD). His teachers include Hussain Ahmad Madani, Muhammad Ibrahim Balyawi, Aizaz Ali Amrohi, Mairajul Haque Deobandi, Muhammad Hussain Bihari, Fakhrul Hasan Muradabadi, Naseer Ahmad Khan, and Sayyid Hasan Deobandi.

== Career ==
After graduating from Darul Uloom Deoband, Kairanawi was the private secretary of Habib-ur-Rehman Ludhianvi until his death in 1956, and in the meantime, in 1952, he visited Saudi Arabia as the spokesperson of a goodwill delegation.

In 1958, he established an institution called Darul Fikr (Arabic: دار الفكر) in Deoband for students interested in the Arabic language, and from this institution issued a monthly magazine called Al-Qāsim (Arabic: القاسم), which continued to be published for years and gained popularity among the students and the scholars.

In 1963, he was appointed as a teacher in the Arabic department at Darul Uloom Deoband. In 1964, he established a department called "Al-Nadi Al-Adabi" (Arabic: النادي الأدبي) in Darul Uloom Deoband for the practise of Arabic language and literature.

In 1965, the quarterly magazine Dawat al-Haq (Arabic: دعوة الحق) was launched, and he was appointed its editor. Later, in June 1976 (Jumada al-Thani 1396 AH), a fortnightly (present monthly) Al-Daie (Arabic: الداعي) was published, and for some time he was also its editor.

His teaching period in Darul Uloom Deoband spans a period of thirty years, during which he also taught Hadith books such as Sharḥ Maʿāni al-Āthār and Sunan al-Nasa'i; however, his commitment and interest in teaching Arabic language remained high.

He was a member of the working committee of Jamiat Ulema-e-Hind for a long time, and in 1977, he visited several Arab countries like Saudi Arabia, Bahrain, the United Arab Emirates, etc. as the leader of a three-member delegation.

Jamiat Ulema-e-Hind launched an Arabic newspaper, Al-Kifah (Arabic: الكفاح), of which he was the chief editor for about 15 years between 1973 and 1987. In the meantime, he was also the director of the editorial department of Jamiat Ulama, "Markaz-e-Da'wat-e-Islām".

From 1983 to 1985, he served as the director of the Education Department of Darul Uloom Deoband, and from 1985 to 1987, he served as the Assistant Vice-Chancellor of Darul Uloom.

In 1988, the Milli Jamiat Ulama-e-Hind was established at the National Convention held in Delhi, and he was elected its first president.

In 1988, he established an institution called Darul Muallifīn (Arabic: دار المؤلفین) in Deoband for the purpose of employing young scholars to study the writings and literary services of great scholars, from which about 20 books were published.

In 1990, the governing body of Darul Uloom Deoband issued a pension to him due to illness and an excuse.

== Literary works ==
Kairanawi's works include:

- Al Qamūs Al Wahīd (Arabic to Urdu dictionary)
- Al Qamūs Al Jadīd (Arabic to Urdu dictionary)
- Al Qamūs Al Jadīd (Urdu to Arabic dictionary)
- Al Qamūs Al Istilāhi (Arabic to Urdu dictionary)
- Al Qamūs Al Istilāhi (Urdu to Arabic dictionary)
- Al Qamūs Al Muhīt (prepared the Arabic to Urdu version of the Arabic-to-Arabic dictionary of "Al-Qamūs Al-Muhīt" by Muhammad Bin Ya‘qoob Firuzabadi).
- Al qirā'at ul wāziha: (3 volumes, which is the syllabus included in most of the madrasas of the Subcontinent.)
- Nafhatul Adab
- Jawāhirul Ma'ārif (a collection of important academic and research discussions from the Ma'ariful Qur'an by Muhammad Shafi in three volumes.)
- Taqsīm al-hind wal Muslimūn fi al-jamhūriyyat al-hindiyyah (Arabic translation of Mohammad Ahmad Kazimi's Urdu book Taqsīm e Hind aur Muslamān.)
- Aakhirat Ka Safarnama (The journey of the Akhirah)
- Shar'ī Namāz (Islamic prayer)
- Insāniyyat Ka Paighām (A message to humanity)
- Achchha Khāwind (Good Husband)
- Achchhi Bīwi (Good Wife)
- Khuda Ka In‘ām (God's reward)
- Al-Qamūs Al-Maudoo‘ī (Unpublished dictionary)
- Nukhbatul Ahādīth (Unpublished)
- Silsilatul duroos ul-arabia (Unpublished)

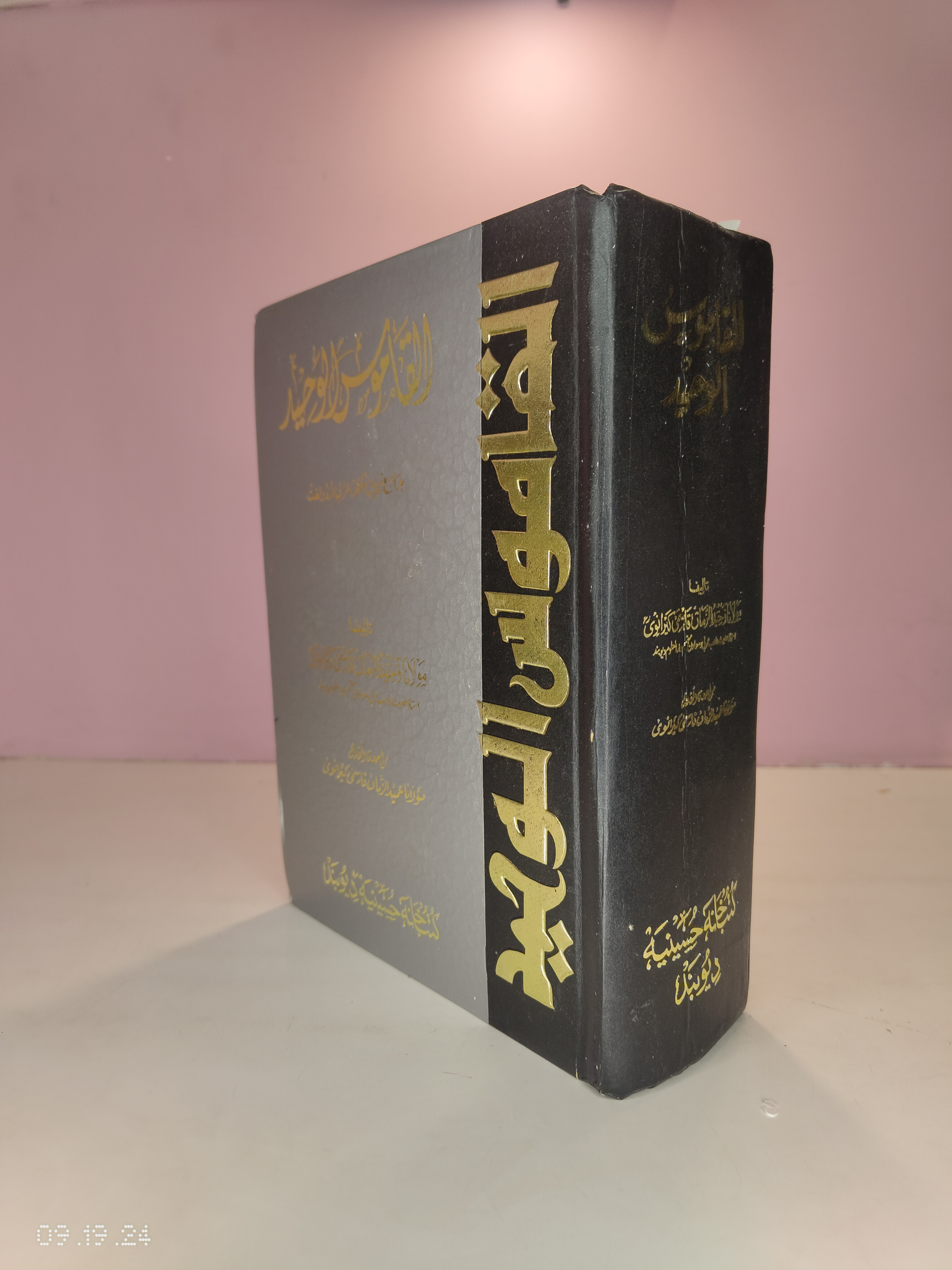
Al Qamus Al Wahid

== Death ==
Kairanawi died on 15 April 1995, in Zakir Nagar, New Delhi, and was buried in Mazar-e-Qasmi in Deoband.

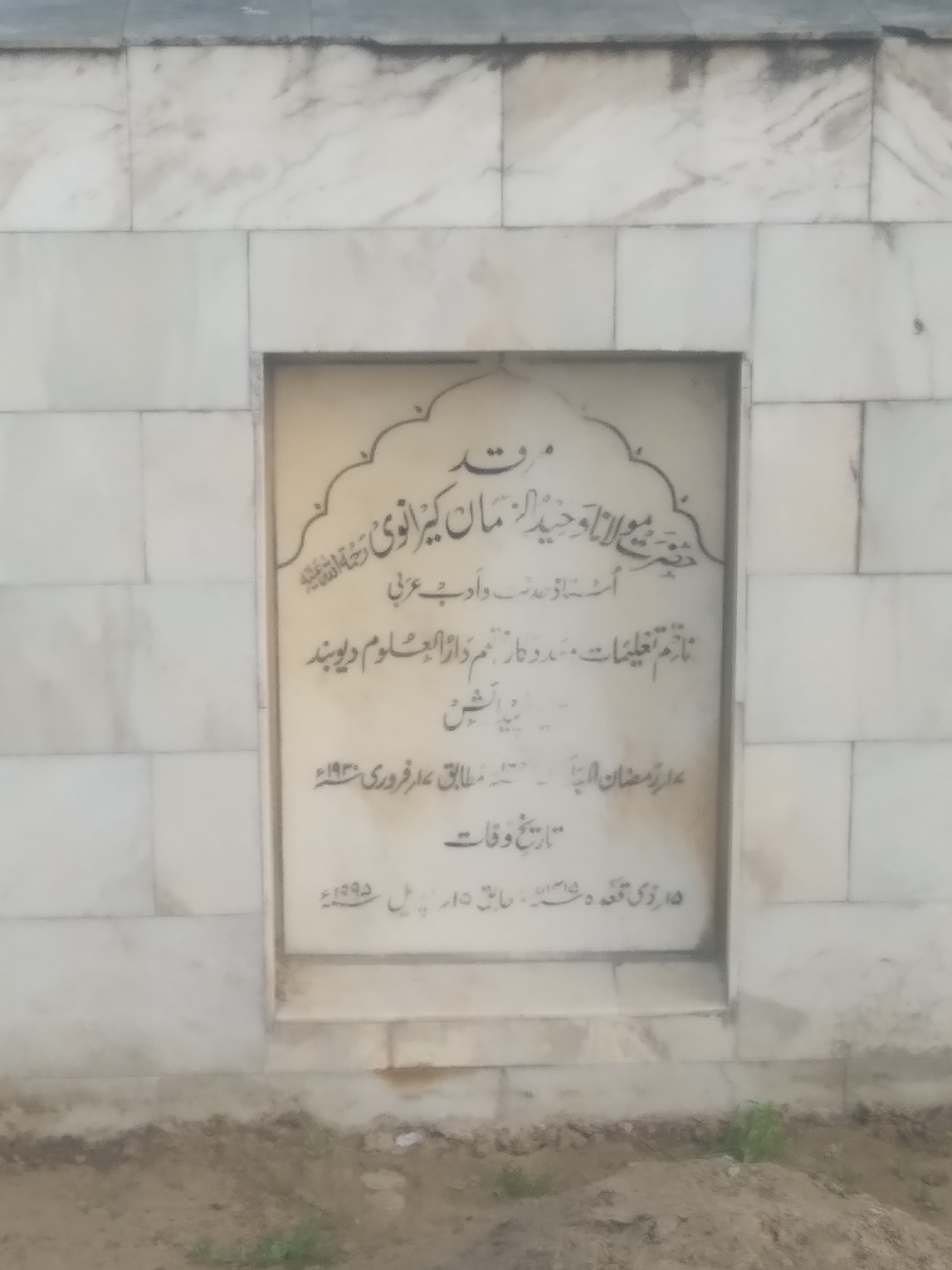
Inscription on Wahiduzzaman Kairanawi's grave in the Qasmi Cemetery in Deoband

== See also ==
- List of Deobandis

== Bibliography ==
- Amini, Noor Alam Khalil (December 2000). Woh Koh Kan Ki Baat [Mention of a hardworking person] (in Urdu) (3rd ed.). Deoband: Idara Ilm o Adab.
- Akhtar, Mehjabeen (December 2000). Maulana Waheeduzzaman Kairanawi–Hayāt o Khidmāt [Maulana Waheeduzzama Keeranvi: His Life And Work] (in Urdu). Deoband: Idara Ilm o Adab.
- Qasmi, Muhammad Afzalul Haque Johar; Azmi, As'ad, eds. (1995). "Maulana Wahiduzzaman Kairanawi Number". Monthly Tarjaman e Darul Uloom (in Urdu). Joga Bai, Jamia Nagar, New Delhi: Tanzeem Abna e Qadeem Darul Uloom Deoband.
- Kairānawi, ‘Amīduzzamān Qasmi (2000). The foreword on "Al-Qamoos Al-Wahid" (in Urdu). Deoband: Kutub Khānah Husaina.
- Qasmi, Muhammadullah Khalili (October 2020). Darul Uloom Deoband Ki Jami' o Mukhtasar Tārīkh [A comprehensive and brief history of Darul Uloom Deoband] (in Urdu) (3rd ed.). Deoband: Shaikhul Hind Academy.
- Amini, Noor Alam Khalil (May 2010). Pas-e-Marg Zinda [People who are still alive after death] (in Urdu) (3rd ed.). Deoband: Idara Ilm o Adab.
- Azmi, Habibur Rahman Qasmi (April–July 1996). "Two tragic accidents". Monthly Darul Uloom (in Urdu). 81 (7). Deoband: Darul Uloom Deoband.
- Alig, Qamruzzaman (2001). Maulavi Wahiduzzaman Karanvi his contribution to Arabic language and literature in India (Thesis) (in Urdu). Aligarh, India: Department of Arabic, Aligarh Muslim University. hdl:10603/57789.
