= Qasmi Cemetery =

Islamic cemetery

- قاسمی قبرستان
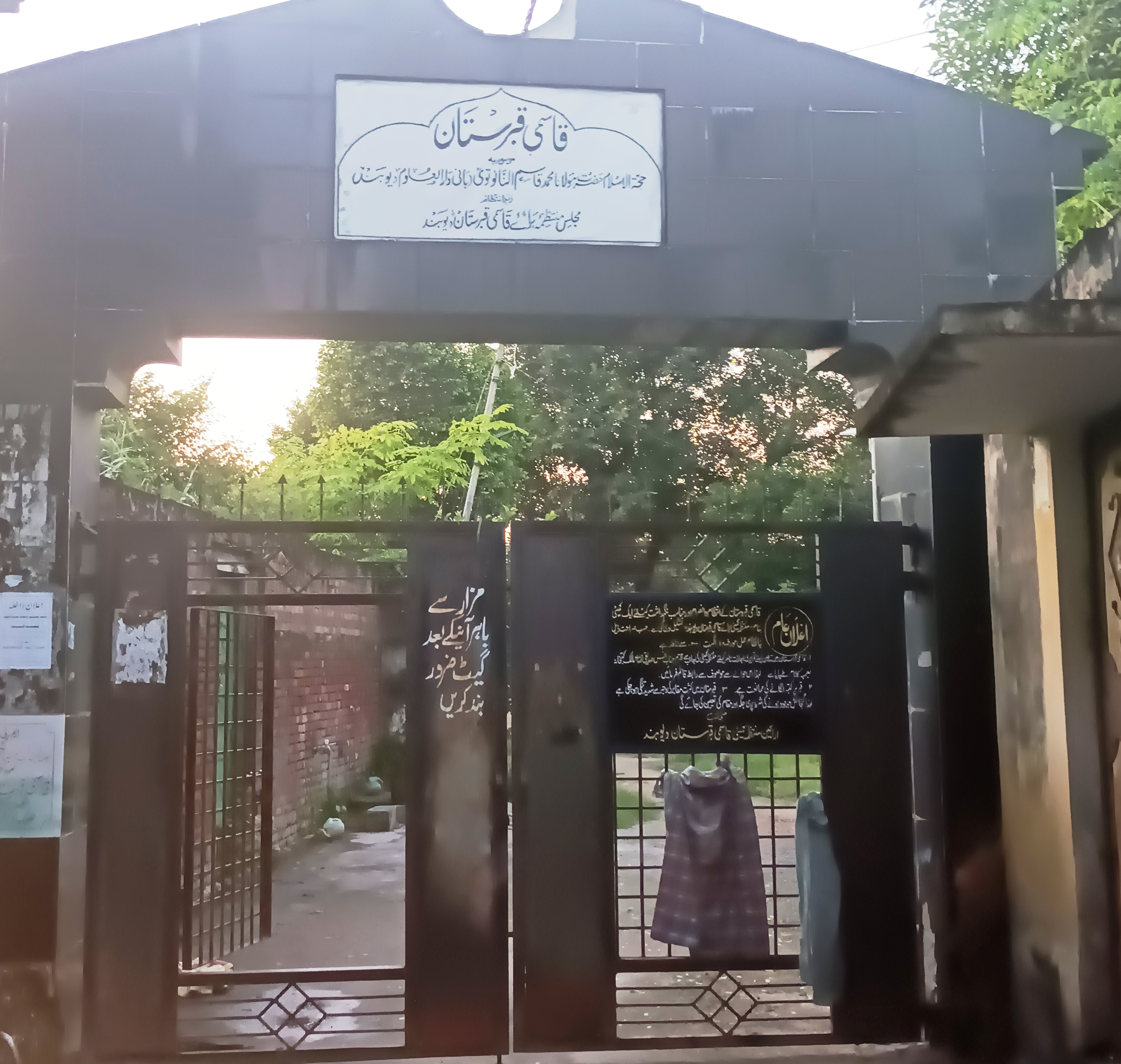
- Entrance to the Qasmi Cemetery
- Interactive map of Qasmi Cemetery

Details
- Location: Deoband, Saharanpur
- Country: Present-day India
- Type: Muslim
- Owned by: Darul Uloom Deoband

Qasmi Cemetery (Urdu: قاسمی قبرستان) is a cemetery located in the premises of Darul Uloom Deoband where notable Deobandi scholars are buried.

== Notable interments ==
- Muhammad Qasim Nanautavi (died 1880)
- Zulfiqar Ali Deobandi (died 1904)
- Mahmud Hasan Deobandi (died 1920)
- Aziz-ul-Rahman Usmani (died 1928)
- Izaz Ali Amrohi (died 1955)
- Hussain Ahmad Madani (died 1957)
- Wahiduzzaman Kairanawi (died 1995)
- Asad Madni (died 2006)
- Kafilur Rahman Nishat Usmani (died 2006)
- Marghubur Rahman Bijnori (died 2010)
- Abdul Haq Azmi (died 2016)
- Ghulam Nabi Kashmiri (died 2019)
- Muhammad Salim Qasmi (died 2018).
- Noor Alam Khalil Amini (died 2021)
- Abdul Khaliq Sambhali (died 2021)
