= Ibrahim Balyawi =

Indian Islamic scholar (1887–1967)

Allamah, Maulana Muhammad Ibrahim Balyawi

6th Principal, Darul Uloom Deoband
- In office 1957–1967
- Preceded by: Hussain Ahmad Madani
- Succeeded by: Syed Fakhruddin Ahmad

Personal life
- Born: 1887 Qazipura, Ballia district, British India
- Died: 27 December 1967 (aged 79–80) Deoband, Uttar Pradesh, India
- Resting place: Qasmi cemetery, Deoband
- Education: Darul Uloom Deoband

Religious life
- Religion: Islam
- Denomination: Sunni
- Jurisprudence: Hanafi
- Creed: Maturidi
- Movement: Deobandi

Senior posting
- Teacher: Saeed Ahmad Sandwipi
- Disciple of: Wasiullah Fatehpuri
- Students: Sharif Hasan Deobandi, Saeed Ahmad Palanpuri

Muhammad Ibrahim Balyawi (1887–1967), also spelt as Muhammad Ibrahim Balliavi, was an Indian Sunni Muslim scholar who served as the 6th Principal of Darul Uloom Deoband. He spent almost 50 years instructing Hadith, Mantiq, Islamic philosophy, and other subjects at Darul Uloom Deoband.

== Early life and education ==
Muhammad Ibrahim Balyawi was born in 1304 AH (1887 AD) at Qazipura, Ballia. His family came to Jaunpur from the Jhang district of Punjab province, then settled in Ballia. His father, Abdur Rahim, was an alumnus of Darul Uloom Jaunpur.

He received his elementary education in Persian and Arabic from Jamiluddin Naginavi in Jaunpur, read books on logic from Farooq Ahmad Chirayakoti and Hidayatullah Khan Rampuri, and studied theology from Abdul Ghaffar Mauwi.

He enrolled at Darul Uloom Deoband in 1325 AH (1907 AD) and graduated from there in 1327 AH (1909 AD). At the Deoband seminary, his teachers included Mahmood Hasan Deobandi and Azizur Rahman Usmani.

== Career ==
After graduation, Balyawi was first appointed as a teacher at Madrasa Alia Fatehpuri, Delhi. Then he spent some time as a teacher at Umri Kalan, Moradabad. In 1331 AH, he was appointed as a teacher at Darul Uloom Deoband and remained there until 1339 AH.

Between 1340 AH and 1343 AH, he held the position of principal in Darul Uloom Mau and Madrasa Imdadia Darbhanga. He returned to Darul Uloom Deoband in 1343 AH as a teacher and resigned from there in 1362 AH. After that, he served as principal at Jamia Islamia Talimuddin, Madrasa Alia Fathpuri, Delhi, and Hathazari Madrasa, respectively.

In 1366 AH, he was appointed as a teacher at Darul Uloom for the third time at Qari Muhammad Tayyib's recommendation and with the approval of the Majlis-e-Shura (the advisory committee of Darul Uloom). In 1377 AH (1957 AD), after the demise of Hussain Ahmad Madani, he was promoted to principal and held this position until his death, i.e., in 1387 AH (1967 AD).

He took the oath of Bay'ah at the hand of his student, Wasiullah Fatehpuri in Sufism, and became his authorised disciple.

== Literary works ==
Balyawi's books include:

- Hadiyyat al-Ahwadhi (a commentary on Jami' al-Tirmidhi) - unfinished
- Risala-e-Musafaha (a booklet on shaking hands in Islam)
- Risala-e-Tarāweeh (a booklet on Tarawih)
- Anwar-ul-Hikmah (a booklet in Islamic philosophy)
- Ziya-un-Nujoom (a footnote on Sullam-ul-Uloom)

== Death ==
Balyawi died on Wednesday, 24 Ramadan 1387 AH (27 December 1967) in Deoband and was buried in Qasmi cemetery.

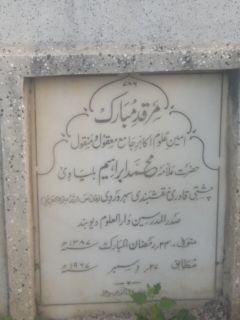
Inscription on Muhammad Ibrahim Balyawi's grave in the Qasmi Cemetery in Deoband

== See also ==
- List of Deobandis
