= Syed Fakhruddin Ahmad =

Indian Muslim scholar and jurist (1889–1972)

Mawlānā Syed Fakhruddin Ahmad

Shaykh al-Hadith

6th President of Jamiat Ulama-e-Hind
- In office December 1959 – 5 April 1972
- Preceded by: Ahmad Saeed Dehlavi
- Succeeded by: Asad Madni

6th Sheikh-ul-Hadith of Darul Uloom Deoband
- In office 1957 – 5 April 1972
- Preceded by: Husain Ahmad Madani
- Succeeded by: Sharif Hasan Deobandi

7th Principal of Darul Uloom Deoband
- In office 1967 – 5 April 1972
- Preceded by: Ibrahim Balyawi
- Succeeded by: Fakhrul Hasan Moradabadi

Personal life
- Born: 1889 Ajmer, British India
- Died: 5 April 1972 (aged 82–83) Moradabad, Uttar Pradesh, India
- Region: British India/India
- Main interest: Hadith
- Notable work(s): Al-Qaul al-Fasih, Izaahul Bukhari
- Education: Darul Uloom Deoband

Religious life
- Religion: Islam
- Denomination: Sunni
- Jurisprudence: Hanafi
- Movement: Deobandi

Muslim leader
- Students: Muhibbullah Babunagari, Saeed Ahmad Palanpuri, Abul Qasim Nomani, Muhammad Jabir Qasmi
- Influenced: Nizamuddin Asir Adrawi

Syed Fakhruddin Ahmad (1889-1972) was an Indian Sunni Muslim scholar and jurist who served as the Principal of Madrasa Shahi, and the sixth President of Jamiat Ulama-e-Hind. He was a professor of hadith at the Darul Uloom Deoband.

== Biography ==
Syed Fakhruddin Ahmad studied the Quran with his mother and Persian with members of his family. At the age of eight, he began studying Arabic grammar and syntax. He enrolled at Madrassa Manba al-Ulum, Gulaothi, where he studied under Majid Ali Jaunpuri. He later accompanied Jaunpuri to Delhi and studied books on the rational sciences in the city's madrasas.

In 1908, Ahmad entered the Darul Uloom Deoband. On the instructions of Mahmud Hasan Deobandi, he completed the Dawra-e-Hadith course over two years instead of the usual one year.

After graduating, Ahmad was appointed as a teacher at Darul Uloom Deoband, where he taught introductory-level texts including Sharh Jami, Nafkhat al-Yaman, and Kanz al-Daqa'iq for about a year.

On 13 Shawwal 1329 AH, he was appointed to Madrasa Shahi, Moradabad, where he taught Sunan Abu Dawood, Tafsir al-Jalalayn, Sharh al-'Aqa'id, and Mulla Hasan during his early years there.

Following the death of Mahmud Hasan Sahaswani in 1340 AH, Ahmad succeeded him as Sadr al-Mudarrisīn (head of teaching). He remained in that position until 1377 AH, when he returned to Darul Uloom Deoband. During his 48-year association with Madrasa Shahi, he also served in its ifta department for a period. After the death of Abdul Haq Madani in 1375 AH, he was appointed Muhtamim (rector) of the institution, assisted by Manzur Husain Qasmi. During his tenure as Sadr al-Mudarrisīn (1340–1377 AH), 714 students studied Sahih al-Bukhari under him.

Following the death of Hussain Ahmad Madani in 1957, Ahmad was appointed Shaykh al-Hadith (senior professor of hadith) at Darul Uloom Deoband. Between 1377 and 1383 AH, 1,161 students studied Sahih al-Bukhari under him. His students included Saeed Ahmad Palanpuri, Abul Qasim Nomani, and Abdul Ghani Azhari

During the presidency of Hussain Ahmad Madani, Ahmad twice served as vice-president of Jamiat Ulama-e-Hind. Following the death of Ahmad Saeed Dehlavi in December 1959, he became the organisation's president.

Ahmad died on 5 April 1972 (20 Safar 1392 AH), aged 82 or 83. His funeral prayer was led by Muhammad Tayyib Qasmi in Moradabad.

== Literary works ==
Works of Ahmad include:

- Al-Qaul al-Faseeh
- Aameen Bil Jehr Sahih Bukhari Ke Pesh Karda Dala’il Ki Roshni Main
- Izaahul Bukhari
