= List of Darul Uloom Deoband alumni =

Darul Uloom Deoband is a major Islamic seminary in India. It was established by Fazlur Rahman Usmani, Muhammad Qasim Nanautawi, Sayyid Muhammad Abid and few other scholars in the town of Deoband. Its well known alumni include Mahmud Hasan Deobandi, the founder of Jamia Millia Islamia, and Shabbir Ahmad Usmani, one of the founding figures of Pakistan. The following is a list of its alumni.

== Alumni ==
Name	Notability	Ref
Abdul Ghani Azhari (1922–2023)	He established the Dar al-‘Ulum Nizamiyya Madinatul Islam in Badshahibagh in Saharanpur.	
Abdul Haq Akorwi (1912–1988)	He was a Pakistani Islamic scholar and the founder, chancellor, and Shaykh al-Hadith of the Islamic seminary Darul Uloom Haqqania. He was involved in the politics as a member of the political party Jamiat Ulema-e-Islam. He served three times in the National Assembly of Pakistan and was an active proponent of the Khatm-i Nabuwwat movement.	
Ahmad Ali Badarpuri (1915–2000)	He was the former Shaykh al-Hadith of the Darul Uloom Banskandi and served as the president of the Assam State Jamiat Ulama-e-Hind from 1957 to 2000.	
Abdul Haq Azmi (1928–2016)	He was former Shaykh al-Hadith of the Darul Uloom Deoband and taught Sahih al-Bukhari at the institution for 34 years. He is also known as Shaykh Saani.	
Abdul Khaliq Sambhali (1950–2021)	He was a vice-rector of the Darul Uloom Deoband.	
Abdul Momin Imambari (1932–2020)	Amir of Jamiat Ulema-e-Islam Bangladesh (2005–2020)	
Mufti Abdul Razzaq (1932– 2021)	He was the vice-president of Jamiat Ulama-e-Hind.	
Abdul Matin Chowdhury (1915–1990)	Bangladeshi religious scholar and political activist involved in the independence movements for both India and Bangladesh. Was influential in the Bangladesh Khilafat movement.	
Abdul Wahid Bengali (1850–1905)	He was one of the first Bengali students and co-founded Hathazari Madrasa.	
Abdur Rahman (scholar) (1920–2015)	He was a Bangladeshi religious scholar and wrote poetry in Persian.	
Abu Zafar Mohammad Saleh (1915–1990)	Bangladeshi Islamic scholar	
Abul Hasan Jashori (1918–1993)	Scholar of Hadith, freedom fighter and founding principal of Jamia Ejazia Darul Uloom Jessore.	
Abul Kalam Qasmi (1950–2021)	He was an Urdu critic and scholar who served as the chairman of Aligarh Muslim University's Urdu department.	
Ahmad Hasan Amrohi (1850–1915)	He was a muhaddith and jurist, who served as the first principal of Madrasa Shahi in Moradabad.	
Athar Ali Bengali (1891–1976)	He was a Bangladeshi religious scholar and political activist who was involved in the independence movement of Pakistan. He was the founding president of the Nizam-e-Islam party.	
Anwar Shah Kashmiri (1875–1933)	He was a scholar of ahadith. Former Shaikhul Hadith of Darul Uloom Deoband.	
Anzar Shah Kashmiri (1927–2008)	He was a scholar of ahadith and the youngest son of Anwar Shah Kashmiri. He established Jamia Imam Muhammad Anwar Shah, Deoband.	
Arif Jameel Mubarakpuri (born 10 March 1971)	He is a professor of Arabic language and literature at Darul Uloom Deoband. He is the current editor-in-chief of Arabic monthly, Al-Daie.	
Asghar Hussain Deobandi (1877–1945)	Generally, he used to teach the books of Tafsir and Hadith, thus the management of the Darul Uloom assigned him the responsibility to teach the students Daurah Hadith (teaching the specific Hadith books Bukhari, Muslim, etc.) and Jalalayn and Durr-e-Mukhtar.	
Ashraf Ali Thanwi (1863–1943)	He was a Sufi sheikh, known for his Quranic exegesis, Bayanul Quran, and Bahishti Zewar (about matters of Islamic jurisprudence specific to women).	
Atiqur Rahman Usmani	He co-founded Nadwatul Musannifeen and All India Muslim Majlis-e-Mushawarat.	
Azizul Haq (1903–1961)	Founder of Al Jamia Al Islamia Patiya	
Azizul Haque (1919–2012)	Founder of the Khelafat Majlish and the first person to entirely translate Sahih al-Bukhari into the Bengali language.	
Aziz-ul-Rahman Usmani	He served as First Grand Mufti of Darul Uloom Deoband.	
Badruddin Ajmal	Perfumer, founder of the All India United Democratic Front and president of Jamiat Ulema-e-Hind's Assam branch.	
Badre Alam Merathi	Compiler of Fayd al-Bari ala Sahih al-Bukhari	
Deen Muhammad Khan	He was a Bangladeshi Islamic scholar and known for interpreting the Quran in Urdu. He was one of the founders of Jamia Qurania Arabia Lalbagh. He taught for sometime in the Department of Islamic Studies at University of Dhaka and later at Government Madrasah-e-Alia. He was the General Secretary of Jamiat Ulema-e-Islam Bangladesh.	
Faizul Waheed	He wrote the first Gojri translation and exegesis of the Quran	
Syed Fakhruddin Ahmad (1889–1972)	He was a Shaykh al-Hadith, the patron of many hadith scholars. He also served as one of the principals of Darul Uloom Deoband.	
Fateh Muhammad Panipati (1905–1987)	Scholar of qira'at who authored Inayate Rahmani, a commentary on al-Qasim ibn Firruh's Ḥirz alAmānī wa Wajh al-Tahānī, commonly known as al-Shatibiyyah.	
Fuzail Ahmad Nasiri (born 1978)	Professor of hadith and Vice Administrator of Education at Jamia Imam Muhammad Anwar Shah, Deoband.	
Ghulam Mustafa Qasmi	He was a Sindhi scholar and writer.	
Habib Al-Rahman Al-Azmi (1900–1992)	He was a scholar of ahadith. His efforts brought Musannaf of Abd al-Razzaq al-San'ani back in original form.	
Habibullah Qurayshi (1865–1943)	He was the founding director-general of Hathazari Madrasa.	
Habib-ur-Rehman Ludhianvi (1892–1956)	He was the leader of Majlis-e-Ahrar-ul-Islam.	
Hafezzi Huzur (1895–1987)	Founder of Bangladesh Khilafat Andolan and first religious figure to stand up for the highest state office in Bangladesh.	
Hamid al-Ansari Ghazi (1909 – 16 October 1992)	He was the editor of Madina.	
Hifzur Rahman Seoharwi (1900 – 2 August 1962)	He was an author in Urdu. He fought against British rule for about 25 years (1922–1947) and spent eight years in jail. He was a politician as well and served as member of Indian Parliament for the Indian National Congress from Amroha from 1952 to 1962. He wrote Islam ka iqtesadi Nizam, Akhlaq aur Falsafa-e-Akhlaq and Qasas al-Quran.	
Hussain Ahmad Madani (1879–1957)	He was a former shaikhul hadith of Darul Uloom and an Islamic scholar from the Indian subcontinent. Contemporary Deobandis regard him with the titles of Shaykh al-Islām and Shaykh Ul Arab Wal Ajam to acknowledge his expertise in hadith and fiqh. Being the top leader of Jamiat Ulema-e-Hind, he wrote the book Composite Nationalism and Islam to refute Two Nation Theory.	
Ibrahim Balyawi (1887–1976)	He served as the 6th principal of Darul Uloom Deoband. He spent almost 50 years instructing Hadith, Mantiq, Islamic philosophy, and other subjects at Darul Uloom Deoband.	
Kafeel Ahmad Qasmi (born 1951)	He is an Indian Islamic scholar, academic, and litterateur of Arabic and Urdu.	
Khalid Saifullah Rahmani (born 1956)	He is the general secretary of Islamic Fiqh Academy, India.	
Muhammad Idris Kandhlawi (1899–1974)	He served as Shaykh-ut-Tafseer at Jamia Ashrafia Lahore and produced the books like Maariful Quran, Seeratul Mustafa, Hujjiyat-e-Hadees, at-Ta’liq as-Sabih (Arabic commentary of: Mishkat al-Masabih).	
Muhammad Ilyas Kandhlawi (1885–1944)	He was the founder of the Tabligh Jamaat.	
Muhammad Ismail Katki (1914–2005)	He was associated with the Khatm-e-Nubuwwat movement in India, particularly in the state of Odisha.	
Muhammad Wakkas (1952–2021)	He established Jamia Imdadia Madaninagar and served as a member of parliament and state minister in Bangladesh, as well as secretary-general and president of Jamiat Ulema-e-Islam Bangladesh.	
Imamuddin Punjabi (died 1916)	He established the Jamia Miftahul Uloom.	
Ibrahim Ali Tashna (1872–1931)	He established several madrasas in northern Sylhet and wrote books and poetry in Bengali, Persian and Urdu.	
Ishtiaque Ahmad Qasmi (born 1974)	He is an Indian Islamic scholar, mufti, and writer. He has been serving as a teacher at Darul Uloom Deoband since 2008.	
Izaz Ali Amrohi (died 1955)	He served the Darul Uloom Deoband as Chief Mufti twice: first time from 1927 to 1928 and second time from 1944 to 1946. His students include Muhammad Shafi. His book Nafhatul Arab is taught in the Dars-e-Nizami syllabus in many madrassas including the Darul Uloom Deoband.	
Mahfoozur Rahman Nami, (1911–1963)	He established Madrasa nūr-ul-ulūm and Azad Inter College in Bahraich.	
Mahfuzul Haque (born 1969)	He is the vice-president of Hefazat-e-Islam Bangladesh, secretary general of Befaqul Madarisil Arabia Bangladesh, chancellor of Jamia Rahmania Arabia, Dhaka. He is also a member of the standing committee of Al Haiatul Ulya and was the secretary-general of Bangladesh Khelafat Majlish.	
Mahmood Hasan Deobandi (1851–1920)	He was known as Shaikh-al-Hind, the first student of Darul Uloom Deoband and leader of the anti-colonial Silk Letter Conspiracy.	
Mahmood Hasan Gangohi, ( 1907–1996)	He is a former Grand Mufti of the Darul Uloom Deoband. Author of Fatawa Mahmoodiyyah (32 Volumes). Sheikh of Tasawwuf, disciple of Zakariyya Kandhlawi.	
Majid Ali Jaunpuri (died 1935)	He was the imam of logic and philosophy of his time. He was native of Jaunpur, Uttar Pradesh.	
Manazir Ahsan Gilani (1892–1956)	notable Urdu author and writer. He produced the books like Tadwin-e-Hadith and Tadwin-e-Fiqh. He served the Osmania University as Dean of The Faculty of Theology during his career.	
Muhammad Masihullah Khan (1912–1992)	He was a Sufi Shaykh and a disciple of Ashraf Ali Thanwi.	
Maqsudullah (1883–1924)	He was a disciple of Ashraf Ali Thanwi and Pir of Talgachhia in Barisal, Bangladesh.	
Mufti Mahmud (1919–1980)	He was a member of Indian National Congress party, and one of the founding members of the Jamiat Ulema-e-Islam (JUI) in Pakistan. On 1 March 1972, he was elected as the Chief Minister of the province of Khyber-Pakhtunkhwa (then Northwest Frontier Province) during the Zulfiqar Ali Bhutto regime in Pakistan.	
Minnatullah Rahmani (7 April 1913 – 20 March 1991)	He was the first general secretary of All India Muslim Personal Law Board.	
Mushahid Ahmad Bayampuri (1907–1971)	Member of the 3rd National Assembly of Pakistan for Sylhet-II	
Muhammad Miyan Deobandi (1903–1975)	He was an historian and author.	
Murtaza Hasan Chandpuri (1868–1951)	He is also known as Ibne Sher-e-Khuda. He was a disciple of Ashraf Ali Thanwi. He refuted accusations and allegations Ahmad Raza Khan had made against scholars of Darul Uloom Deoband. He produced a number of articles published as Majmua Rasail-e-Chandpuri.	
Muhammad Mustafa Al-A'zami (1930–2017)	Despite being one of the recent Hadith scholars, he was the recipient of the King Faisal International Award 1980. He authored The History of the Qur'anic Text from Revelation to Compilation: A Comparative Study with the Old and New Testaments, Hadith Methodology and Literature, On Schacht's Origins of Muhammadan Jurisprudence etc.	
Muhammad Sahool Bhagalpuri (died 1948)	He was fifth Grand Mufti of Darul Uloom Deoband.	
Nematullah Azami (born 24 December 1936)	is an Indian Islamic scholar, muhaddith, a commentator on the Quran (mufassir), and a faqīh (Islamic jurist). He is the president of India's Islamic Fiqh Academy. He has also been serving as a senior lecturer at Darul Uloom Deoband for forty years.	
Nur Hossain Kasemi (1945–2020)	He was the secretary general of Hefazat-e-Islam Bangladesh and Jamiat Ulema-e-Islam Bangladesh, vice-president of Al-Haiatul Ulya Lil-Jamiatil Qawmia Bangladesh, senior vice-president of Befaqul Madarisil Arabia Bangladesh and Shaykhul Hadith and rector of Jamia Madania Baridhara, Dhaka and Jamia Sobhania Mahmud Nagar.	
Muhammad Tayyib Qasmi (1897–1983)	He was the grandson of Muhammad Qasim Nanautavi, the founder of Deobandi movement. He served Darul Uloom Deoband as mohtamim/VC for more than half century from 1929 to 1981.	
Muhammad Umar Palanpuri (1929–1997)	He was an Indian Islamic scholar and preacher associated with the Tablighi Jamaat.	
Mujahidul Islam Qasmi	He was a Muslim jurist.	
Mohammad Najeeb Qasmi	He is an author and writer as well as the founder of Al-Noor Public School in Sambhal, Uttar Pradesh.	
Nazir Ahmad Qasmi (born 20 June 1964)	He is the Grand Mufti of Darul Uloom Raheemiyyah.	
Noor Alam Khalil Amini (1952–2021)	He was a senior professor of Arabic language and literature at the Darul Uloom Deoband. He was a litterateur of Arabic and Urdu, and served as the chief editor of its monthly Arabic magazine Al-Dai.	
Nur Uddin Gohorpuri (1924–2005)	Chairman of Befaqul Madarisil Arabia Bangladesh, founder of Gohorpur Hussainia Madrasa.	
Rahmatullah Mir Qasmi	He is the founder of Darul Uloom Raheemiyyah, biggest Islamic madrasa in Kashmir.	
Saeed Ahmad Palanpuri (1942 – 19 May 2020)	He was former Shaykh al-Hadith and principal of Darul Uloom Deoband	
Saleemullah Khan (1921 – 15 January 2017)	He was a Pakistani Islamic scholar and former president of Wifaq ul Madaris Al-Arabia, Pakistan. Taqi Usmani and Mufti Rafi Usmani are among his top known students. He established Jamia Farooqia in Karachi in 1967.	
Sanaullah Amritsari (1868–1948)	He was a prominent scholar of Ahl-e-Hadith movement, and a co-founder of the Jamiat Ulama-e-Hind	
Sayyid Mumtaz Ali (1860–1935)	The founder of "Darul Isha'at" and "Rifah-e-Aam press" in Lahore, Sayyid Mumtaz Ali was an advocate of women rights in the late nineteenth century.	
Shamsuddin Qasemi (1935–1996)	Founder of numerous madrasas in Bangladesh, and former secretary-general of the Jamiat Ulema-e-Islam Bangladesh.	
Shukrullah Mubarakpuri (1895,1896 – 23 March 1942)	He was a notable scholar of rational sciences and second naazim (director) of Madrasa Ehya al-Ulum, Mubarakpur. His notable students include Qazi Athar Mubarakpuri and former Grand Mufti of the Darul Uloom Deoband, Mufti Nizamuddin Azmi.	
Sultan Ahmad Nanupuri	Founding principal of Al-Jamiah Al-Islamiah Obaidia Nanupur	
Syed Ahmad Hashmi (1932–2001)	He was the seventh general secretary of Jamiat Ulama-e-Hind, twice a member of the Rajya Sabha and the chairman of Passenger Amenities Committee.	
Saeed Ahmad Akbarabadi (1908–1985)	He served as dean of the Faculty of Theology at Aligarh Muslim University, principal at Madrasa-e-Aliya, Calcutta, and lecturer at St. Stephen's College, Delhi. His books include Siddeeq-e-Akbar, Fehm-e-Quran and Wahi-e-Ilahi to his credit.	
Muhammad Salim Qasmi (1926–2018)	He was the former chief-rector of Darul Uloom Waqf, Deoband and the son of Qari Muhammad Tayyib. He was the patron of Islamic Fiqh Academy, India and vice-president of All India Muslim Personal Law Board.	
Muhammad Sarfaraz Khan Safdar (1914–2009)	He was a Pakistani Islamic scholar and author.	
Muhammad Shafi (1897–1976)	He was a South Asian Sunni Islamic scholar of the Deobandi school of Islamic thought. A Hanafi jurist and mufti, he was also an authority on shari'ah, hadith, tafsir (Qur'anic exegesis), and tasawwuf (Sufism). After the independence he moved to Pakistan, where he established Darul Uloom Karachi in 1951. Of his written works, his best-known is Ma'ariful Qur'an, a tafsir of the Qur'an.	
Muhammad Sufyan Qasmi (born 1954)	He is the incumbent rector of Darul Uloom Waqf, Deoband.	
Muhammad Yunus	Known as Shaykhul Arab wal Azam, he was a well-known international Islamic figure. He was the 2nd Rector of Al Jamia Al Islamia Patiya and the founding President of Befaqul Madarisil Arabia Bangladesh.	
Qazi Mu'tasim Billah (1933–2013)	Introduced Bengali-medium in Qawmi madrasa system, longtime principal of Jamia Shariyyah Malibagh and former professor at the University of Dhaka.	
Shabbir Ahmad Usmani (1887–1949)	He was referred to by followers as Shaikhul Islam and was a former member in the Constituent Assembly of Pakistan	
Shah Abdul Wahhab (1894–1982)	He was the chief disciple of Ashraf Ali Thanwi in Bengal and the 2nd Rector of Darul Uloom Hathazari.	
Shah Ahmad Shafi (1916–2020)	He was the former chief of Hefazat-e-Islam Bangladesh and rector of Al-Jamiatul Ahlia Darul Ulum Moinul Islam Hathazari and former chairman of Bangladesh Qawmi Madrasah Education Board.	
Sirajussajidin Katki (1939–2006)	He was the 4th President of Jamiat Ulama Odisha and the second Amīr-e-Sharī'at of Imārat-e-Shar'ia, Odisha.	
Taha Karaan (d. 2021)	He was the head-mufti of Muslim Judicial Council.	
Ubaidul Haq (1928–2007)	He was a former chief cleric of Baitul Mukarram, the national mosque of Bangladesh.	
Ubaidullah Sindhi (1872–1944)	He was a political activist of the Indian independence movement and one of its vigorous leaders. Ubaidullah Sindhi struggled for the independence of British India and for an exploitation-free society in India.	
Usman Mansoorpuri (1944–2021)	He was the national president of Jamiat Ulama-e-Hind from 2006 to May 2021.	
Uzair Gul Peshawari	He was an Indian freedom struggle activist and a companion of Mahmud Hasan Deobandi. He was jailed in Malta for his role in the Silk Letter Movement.	
Yasir Nadeem al Wajidi (b. 1982)	He established the Darul Uloom Online.	
Yusuf Karaan	He was a South African scholar who served as head mufti of Muslim Judicial Council.	
Zayn al-Abidin Sajjad Meerthi 1910–1991)	He was head of the Islamic studies department of Jamia Millia Islamia and a professor of history. His book Tarikh-e-Millat is listed in the must read category in the syllabus of Darul Uloom Deoband and in other madrasas affiliated with it.	
Omar Abedeen Qasmi Madani	He is an Indian Islamic scholar, mufti, and writer. He is deputy director of Al Mahad Al Aali Al Islami, Hyderabad.	
