= Ghulam Nabi Kashmiri =

Indian Islamic scholar (1965–2019)

Bahr al-Uloom Ghulam Nabi Kashmiri

Personal details
- Born: 2 July 1965 Poonch, Jammu and Kashmir
- Died: 7 November 2019 (aged 54)
- Resting place: Mazar-e-Qasmi
- Education: Darul Uloom Deoband; Darul Uloom Waqf; Aligarh Muslim University; Dr. Bhimrao Ambedkar University
- Main interest: Hadith
- Notable work: Hayat-e-Tayyib

Religious life
- Denomination: Sunni
- Jurisprudence: Hanafi
- Movement: Deobandi

Senior posting
- Teacher: Anzar Shah Kashmiri; Muhammad Salim Qasmi

Ghulam Nabi Kashmiri (2 July 1965 – 7 November 2019) was a Kashmiri Muslim scholar and jurist of the Hanafi school who served as the senior professor of hadith at Darul Uloom Waqf. He also taught hadith at Jamia Ziya al-Uloom and Jamiat al-Tayyibat in Poonch. He was among the early graduates of Darul Uloom Waqf and authored books such as Hayat-e-Tayyib, a biography of Muhammad Tayyib Qasmi.

== Early life and education ==
Ghulam Nabi Kashmiri born on 2 July 1965 in Poonch, Jammu and Kashmir. He received primary education at his native place, and joined Darul Uloom Deoband for higher education. Subject to administrative disputes at the Deoband seminary, he moved to newly established Darul Uloom Waqf, from where he graduated in the traditional dars-e-nizami in 1983. He was among its early graduates. He received an M.A in Arabic language from Aligarh Muslim University and an M.A in Urdu language from Dr. Bhimrao Ambedkar University. His teachers included Anzar Shah Kashmiri and Muhammad Salim Qasmi.

== Career ==
Kashmiri was appointed as teacher in Darul Uloom Waqf in 1985. He remained on this post until 2017 and taught books such as Ibn Majah, Abu Dawud, Sunan Tirmidhi, and several books of jurisprudence. He moved to Darul Uloom Zakariya where he was appointed senior professor of hadith, however, he came back to Waqf seminary right after a year. During his last days, he moved to his native place in Poonch and became the senior professor of hadith at Jamia Ziya al-Uloom and Jamiat al-Tayyibat. He also served briefly at the University of Kashmir as a lecturer. His students included Faizul Waheed.

== Literary works ==
Ghulam Nabi Kashmiri's books include:

- Akhlaqiat ka islami tasawwur
- Barah Mahino'n ki barah taqreerein
- At Taliqaat ala Tanzeemul ashtat (Guide of Mishkat Shareef)
- Tasheel al-Mutanabbi (Guide of Deewan-e-Mutanabbi)
- Faizul Imamein (Guide of Jalalein Shareef)
- Hayat-e-Tayyib (2 Volume biography of Qari Muhammad Tayyib)
- Nawa-i-Qalam
- Liberalism aur Islam
- Dawat-O-Tableegh ki Ehemiyat

== Death and legacy ==
Kashmiri went to Deoband after teaching the last lesson on Sahih al-Bukhari in Jamia Zia-ul-Uloom Poonch. He had been suffering from stomach cancer for about 3 years. He died on 7 November 2019 in Delhi. After Isha prayer, Kashmiri's funeral prayers were offered in the premises of Molsari in Darul Uloom Deoband. Muhammad Sufyan Qasmi (rector Darul Uloom Waqf Deoband) led this funeral prayer. He was buried at Mazar-e-Qasmi.

== See also ==
- List of Deobandis
