= Nur Hossain Qasmi =

Bangladeshi Islamic scholar (1945–2020)

Allama Nur Hossain Qasmi
- নূর হুসাইন কাসেমী
- Qasmi in 2020

Secretary General, Hefazat-e-Islam Bangladesh
- In office 15 November 2020 – 13 December 2020
- Preceded by: Junaid Babunagari
- Succeeded by: Nurul Islam Jihadi

Co-chairman, Al-Haiatul Ulya Lil-Jamiatil Qawmia Bangladesh
- In office 3 October 2020 – 13 December 2020
- Preceded by: Abdul Quddus
- Succeeded by: Muhammad Wakkas

Secretary General, Jamiat Ulema-e-Islam Bangladesh
- In office 7 November 2015 – 13 December 2020
- Preceded by: Muhammad Wakkas
- Succeeded by: Monjurul Islam Effendi

Rector, Jamia Madania Baridara, Dhaka
- In office 1988 – 13 December 2020
- Succeeded by: Nazmul Hasan

Personal details
- Born: 10 January 1945 Chodda, Manoharganj, Tipperah, Bengal Presidency
- Died: 13 December 2020 (aged 75) United Hospital, Dhaka, Bangladesh
- Children: 2
- Education: Darul Uloom Deoband

Personal life
- Era: Modern
- Main interest(s): Hadith, Politics
- Notable work: Jamia Madania Baridara

Religious life
- Religion: Islam
- Denomination: Sunni
- Jurisprudence: Hanafi
- Movement: Deobandi

Muslim leader
- Students: Ishaq Faridi
- Influenced by: Shah Ahmad Shafi, Zakariyya Kandhlawi, Mahmood Hasan Gangohi, Anzar Shah Kashmiri, Syed Fakhruddin Ahmad, Muhammad Salim Qasmi
- Influenced: Mamunul Haque, Shahinur Pasha Chowdhury

Nur Hossain Qasmi (10 January 1945 – 13 December 2020) was a Bangladeshi Islamic scholar, politician, educator, religious speaker and spiritual figure. He was the secretary general of Hefazat-e-Islam Bangladesh and Jamiat Ulema-e-Islam Bangladesh, vice-president of Al-Haiatul Ulya Lil-Jamiatil Qawmia Bangladesh, senior vice-president of Befaqul Madarisil Arabia Bangladesh and Shaykhul Hadith and rector of Jamia Madania Baridhara (Dhaka) and Jamia Sobhania Mahmud (Nagar). He had played a leading role in the Hefazat movement, Khatam an-Nabiyyin movement etc.

== Name and lineage ==
Qasmi was born on 10 January 1945 into a Bengali Muslim family in the village of Chodda in Manoharganj under Tipperah district (now Comilla District, Bangladesh).

== Education ==
His education started by enrolling in a primary school near to his house. After class 4, he was admitted at Kashipur Kasemul Uloom Madrasa and studied till the Secondary class. Then he was admitted at Al Jamiatul Islamia Darul Ulum madrassa in Barura. Here, he studied till Jamaat-e Hedaya (Honours 2nd).

Then he went to India to study at Darul Ulum Deoband. He was admitted at Beritazpur madrasa in Saharanpur district after failing to reach the scheduled time. After completing Jamaat-e Jalaline (Honours), he went to Darul Uloom Deoband. He was studying at Deoband for a total of 3 years. Here, after the completion of the Masters in Hadith, he has studied Arabic literature and philosophy.

Teachers

Among his teachers are: Mahmood Hasan Gangohi, Anzar Shah Kashmiri, Syed Fakhruddin Ahmad, Muhammad Salim Qasmi and other eminent figures.

== Career ==
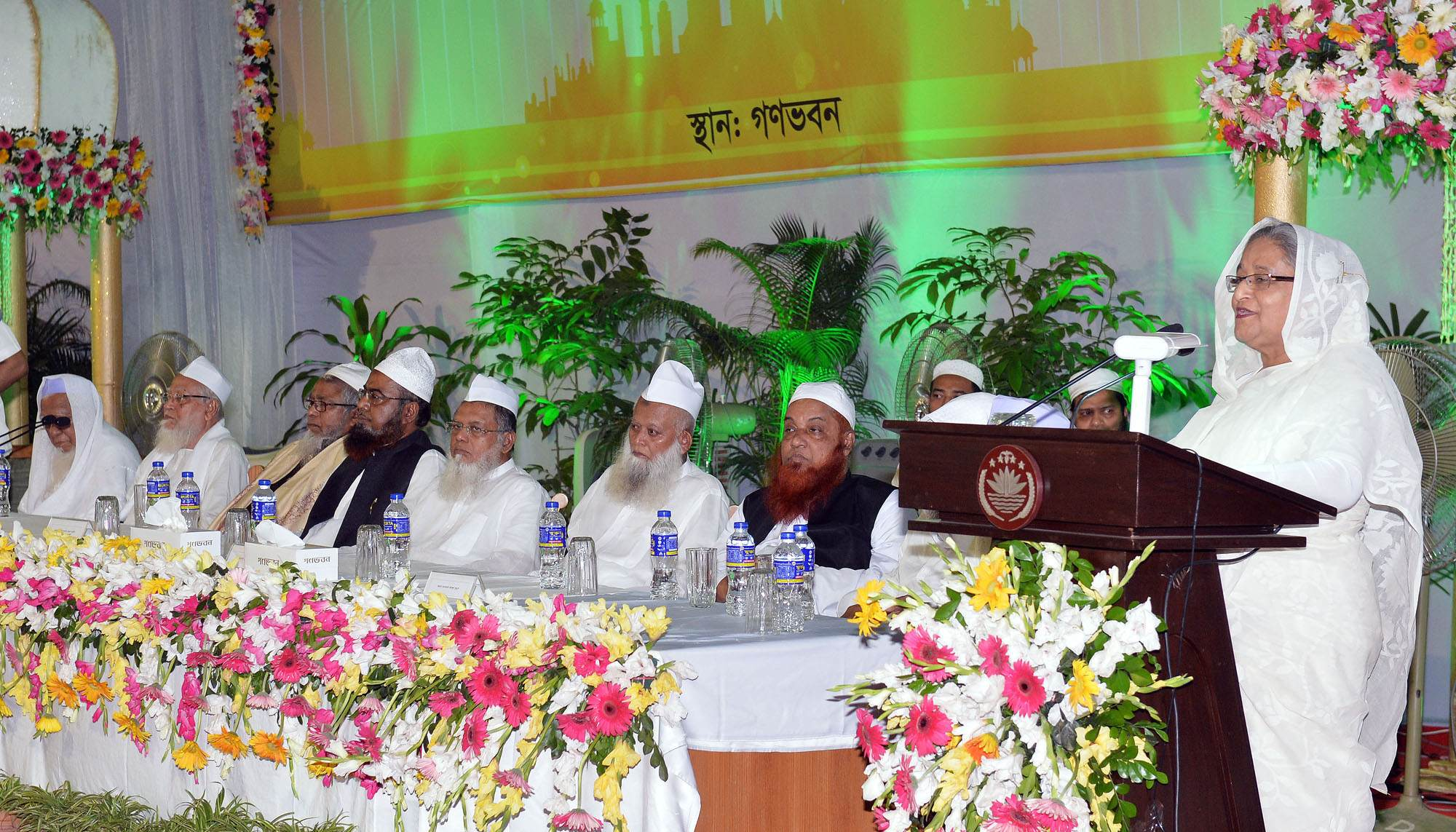

His career started with teaching at Muradia madrassa, established by Muhammad Qasim Nanautavi, based in Muzaffarnagar district, India. After a year of teaching here, he returned to the motherland in late 1973. Then he filled the positions of Shaykhul Hadith and principal at Nandansar Mohius Sunnah Madrasa, Shariatpur District. In 1978, he went to Jamia Arabia Imdadul Uloom Faridabad in Dhaka. Here, he has been teaching for 4 years and was the director of Residential Hostel. In 1982, he came to Jamia Shariyyah Malibagh, Dhaka, founded by Kazi Mutasim Billah. Here, he taught for six years in total. In 1988, he founded Jamia Madania Baridhara (Dhaka) and Jamia Sobhania Mahmood (Nagar) in 1998. Since its inception, he was the rector and Shaykhul Hadith of both seminaries. He was also involved in the management of nearly 45 Islamic seminaries.

On 3 October 2020, he was elected as senior vice president of Befaqul Madarisil Arabia Bangladesh. According to law, he was also the vice president of Al-Haiatul Ulya Lil-Jamiatil Qawmia Bangladesh.

On 15 November 2020, he was elected secretary general of Hefazat-e-Islam Bangladesh and was the president of Hefazat, Dhaka Chapter.

== Politics ==
In 1975, he entered politics with Jamiat Ulema-e-Islam Bangladesh. He came to the central leadership of Jamiat in 1990 and on 7 November 2015 he became its secretary general.

From 1990 to 2000, he was involved in the Khatam an-Nabiyyin movement and served as general secretary.

== Death ==
He died on 13 December 2020 at United Hospital, Dhaka.

In 2021, Yasin Abdur Rauf wrote a biography of him in Arabic. "Nur Hossain Qasmi Conference" was held on 9 January 2021 in Savar.

== See also ==
- List of Deobandis

== Bibliography ==
- Ahmed, Khandaker Mansur (January 2021). "The Life and Ideals of Allama Nur Hossain Qasmi". Alkawsar.
- "Nur Hossain Qasmi, Hefazat-e-Islam Secretary General, Passes Away". BBC Bangla. 13 December 2020.
- Shafiq, Didar (15 December 2024). "Maulana Nur Hossain Qasmi: A Visionary of Strong and Steadfast Leadership". Alokito Bangladesh.
- Amir, Tanzil (13 December 2020). "Religious Circles Mourn the Passing of Allama Nur Hossain Qasmi". Jugantor.
