= Azhar Shah Qaiser =

Indian Islamic scholar

Maulana Azhar Shah Qaiser

Editor-in-chief of Monthly Darul Uloom
- In office 1952–1982
- Preceded by: Abdul Hafeez Balyawi
- Succeeded by: Riyasat Ali Zafar Bijnori

Personal life
- Born: December 1920 Deoband, Saharanpur, United Provinces of British India
- Died: 27 November 1985 (aged 64) Deoband, Saharanpur, India
- Resting place: Mazar-e-Anwari, Deoband
- Parent: Anwar Shah Kashmiri (father)
- Region: India
- Main interest: Urdu literature
- Notable work(s): Yadgaar-e-Zamana Hain Ye Log, Seerat Abu Bakr Siddiq, Zara Umr-e-rafta Ko Awaaz Dena
- Education: Darul Uloom Deoband, Jamia Islamia Talimuddin, Dabhel
- Occupation: Author, islamic scholar
- Relatives: Anzar Shah Kashmiri (brother)

Religious life
- Religion: Islam
- Denomination: Sunni
- Jurisprudence: Hanafi
- Movement: Deobandi

Azhar Shah Qaiser (1920–1985) was an Indian Islamic scholar, journalist and writer. He wrote articles and books in Urdu. He was the elder son of the Indian hadith scholar, Anwar Shah Kashmiri. During his career, he served as the editor of Monthly Darul Uloom, the monthly journal of Darul Uloom Deoband.

== Birth and education ==
Azhar Shah Qaiser was born in December 1920 at Deoband. His father Anwar Shah Kashmiri was a hadith scholar.

Qaiser enrolled in the Darul Uloom Deoband. When his father resigned from the Darul Uloom Deoband in 1927, and moved to Jamia Islamia Talimuddin, Dabhel, Qaiser went with him to Dabhel and continued his studies there. Qaiser was about 12 years old when his father Anwar Shah Kashmiri died in 1933. Facing consequences, Qaiser was not able to complete his studies.

== Career ==
When his father died, people throughout the country offered condolences, including Zafar Ali Khan, an Urdu author and journalist. A condolence ceremony was organised at Jama Masjid in Deoband and the welcome address was prepared by 12-year-old Qaiser. Qaiser presented a copy of this address to Zafar Ali Khan and it was also read aloud in the congregation. Zafar Ali Khan liked this laudatory address so much that he published it on the front page of his Zamindar. Thus began Qaiser's literary life.

Qaiser's articles featured firstly in Monthly Guncha which was published from Bijnor and Monthly Payam-e-Taleem of the Jamia Millia Islamia. Weekly Sadaqat, Saharanpur was released in 1936 and Qaiser became its permanent writer and a member of its editorial board. He started a weekly journal Isteqlal along with Sultan-ul-Haq Qasmi Bijnori. It is difficult to state when it was firstly released although its Eid Number edition appeared in December 1937. In 1939, when Qaiser was 19, a collection of 16 of his articles were published in Sadaqat.

In November 1940, Qaiser released Bi-monthly al-Anwar from Deoband. The journal focused on the life and works of Anwar Shah Kashmiri. Before 1940, in 1939 he worked for Zamindar honorary. Besides Sadaqat Saharanpur and al-Anwar, Deoband, Qaiser took the editorial responsibilities of Haadi, Deoband, first edition of which appeared in May 1949. He wrote short stories and tales like Tuta Huwa A'ina (Broken Mirror), Inqelab, Sharabi Shayar and Azaadi.

Qaiser edited Darul Uloom, the monthly journal of Darul Uloom Deoband, from 1951 to 1982. He also edited Bi-monthly Ijtemah, Saharanpur, Monthly Khalid, Deoband (under supervision of Izaz Ali Amrohi), Monthly Tayyib, Deoband (1983–1985), Bi-monthly Isha'at-e-Haq, Deoband (1975–1985).

== Literary works ==
Qaiser's books include:

- Yadgaar-e-Zamana Hain Ye Log
- Seerat Abu Bakr Siddiq
- Zara Umr-e-rafta Ko Awaaz Dena
- Safeena-e-Watan ke Na Khuda
- Aazaan-e-Bilal

== Death and legacy ==
Qaiser died on 27 November 1985 (13 Rabi' al-awwal 1406 AH) in Deoband. He was buried next to the grave of his father Anwar Shah Kashmiri in Mazar-e-Anwari, Deoband. His son Naseem Akhtar Shah Qaiser is an author of Urdu and a professor at Darul Uloom Waqf, Deoband. He has written a concise biography of his father and his uncle Anzar Shah Kashmiri in his book Do Gohar Aabdaar. He has also written Syed Muhammad Azhar Shah Qaiser Ek Adeeb, Ek Sahafi ("Syed Muhammad Azhar Shah Qaiser: A writer and Journalist") about his father.

== See also ==
- List of Deobandis
