= List of Islamic educational institutions =

Institutions that have an Islamic or Muslim identity or charter include:

== Historical institutions in continuous operations ==
Institutions founded before the colonial era and which are still in operation:

- University of al-Qarawiyyin, Morocco, the oldest existing, continually operating and the first degree-awarding educational institution in the world according to UNESCO and Guinness World Records.
- Al-Azhar University, Cairo
- Al-Mustansiriya University, Baghdad
- University of Ez-Zitouna, Tunis, Tunisia
- University of Timbuktu
- Darul Uloom Deoband, Uttar Pradesh, India
- Darul Uloom Nadwatul Ulama, Lucknow

== Seminaries ==
=== Colonial era ===
Institutions of religious education (most are classified as "madrasas", a term that means "school" or, literally, "place where lessons are given") founded during the colonial era:

- Jamia Nizamia, Hyderabad, India

=== Post-colonial era ===
Religious institutions (or madrasas) founded since the end of colonial rule in the respective countries:

- Al Jamiatul Ashrafia

India

- Markazu Saqafathi Sunniyya

India

- Darul Uloom Deoband India
- Darul Uloom Nadwatul Ulama India
- Dar al-Mustafa, Tarim, Yemen
- Darul Uloom Haqqania, Akora Khattak, PAKISTAN
- Darul Uloom Karachi, Korangi, Karachi, PAKISTAN
- Jamia Faridia, Sector E-7, Islamabad, Pakistan
- Jamia Binoria, S.I.T.E Industrial Area, Karachi, PAKISTAN
- Jamia Uloom-ul-Islamia, Allama Binori Town, Karachi, PAKISTAN
- Darul Huda Islamic University, Malappuram
- Umm al-Qura, Mecca
- Zaytuna College, Hayward, California, US
- Jamiatur Raza, Bareilly India
- Jamiatul Qasim Darul Uloom Al-Islamiah, Supaul

== Non-seminaries ==
=== Colonial era ===
These are institutions founded during colonial era that are not religious seminaries. Most are universities with a broad charter for comprehensive education in the Muslim communities they serve.

- Aligarh Muslim University
- Jamia Millia Islamia, Delhi
- Jamia Osmania
- Sindh Madrasa-tul-Islam, Karachi, Sindh, Pakistan

=== Post-colonial era ===
Educational institutions founded since end of colonial rule that are not religious seminaries, but have an Islamic or Muslim identity or charter, or devoted to sciences and arts usually associated with Islamic or Muslim culture and history:

==== Afghanistan ====
- Kabul University

==== Algeria ====
- Emir Abdelkader University, Constantine

==== Bangladesh ====
- Jamia Ahmadiyya Sunnia Kamil Madrasa, Chittagong
- Islamic University of Technology
- International Islamic University Chittagong
- Islamic University, Bangladesh
- Manarat International University
- Islamic Arabic University
- Bangladesh Islami University

==== Bosnia and Herzegovina ====
- University of Sarajevo

==== Brunei Darussalam ====
- Sultan Sharif Ali Islamic University

==== China ====
- China Islamic Institute
- 9 provincial Islamic institutes

==== Egypt ====
- Al-Azhar University

==== Ghana ====
- Islamic University College, Ghana

==== Indonesia ====
- Islamic University of Indonesia
- Muhammadiyah University of Magelang
- Syarif Hidayatullah State Islamic University Jakarta
- Bandung Islamic University
- Muhammadiyah University of Surakarta
- Muhammadiyah University of Yogyakarta
- Sunan Kalijaga Islamic University
- YARSI University
- Nahdlatul Ulama Islamic University
- International Islamic University of Indonesia

==== India ====
- Darul Uloom Deoband, Uttar Pradesh
- Jamia Razvia Manzar-e-Islam
- Al Jamiatul Ashrafia, Mubarakpur
- Darul Uloom Waqf, Deoband
- Darul Uloom Nadwatul Ulama, Lucknow
- Mazahir Uloom, Saharanpur
- Jamia Nizamia, Hyderabad, India
- Jamiatul Qasim Darul Uloom Al-Islamiah, Supaul
- Jamia Islamia Ishaatul Uloom, Akkalkuwa
- Aligarh Muslim University
- Al-Jame-atul-Islamia, Raunahi
- Jamia Al Barkaat Aligarh, Aligarh
- Darul Uloom Mau, Mau
- Jamia Amjadia Rizvia, Ghosi
- Jamiatur Raza, Bareilly
- Jamia Hamdard, Delhi
- Jamia Millia Islamia, Delhi
- Jamia Markaz, Kozhikode
- Markaz Knowledge City, Kozhikode
- Darul Huda Islamic University
- Ma'din Academy, Malappuram, Kerala
- Al-Ameen Educational Society, Bangalore, Karnataka

==== Iran ====
- Islamic Azad University

==== Iraq ====
- Mustansiriyah University

==== Ireland ====
- Al-Mustafa Islamic Cultural Centre Ireland

==== Jordan ====
- World Islamic Sciences and Education University

==== Malaysia ====
- International Islamic University Malaysia
- Al-Madinah International University
- Selangor International Islamic University College
- Universiti Sains Islam Malaysia
- Universiti Sultan Zainal Abidin
- ms:Universiti Islam Antarabangsa Sultan Abdul Halim Mu'adzam Shah
- Sultan Alam Shah Islamic College
- Universiti Islam Malaysia
- Universiti Sultan Azlan Shah
- ms:Kolej Universiti Islam Zulkifli Muhammad
- Universiti Islam Antarabangsa Tuanku Syed Sirajuddin (UniSiRAJ)
- Universiti Islam Pahang Sultan Ahmad Shah (UniPSAS)

==== Morocco ====
- University of al-Qarawiyyin

==== Netherlands ====
- Islamic University of Applied Sciences Rotterdam

==== Niger ====
- Islamic University of Niger

==== Palestine ====
- Islamic University of Gaza

==== Pakistan ====
- International Islamic University, Islamabad
- Aleemiyah Institute of Islamic Studies
- Jamia Amjadia Rizvia Karachi
- Jamia Naeemia Lahore
- Jamia Nizamia Ghousia Wazirabad
- Jamia-tul-Madina
- Islamia University of Bahawalpur

==== Philippines ====
- Jamiatu Muslim Mindanao

==== Russian Federation ====
- Russian Islamic University, Kazan

==== Saudi Arabia ====
- Islamic University of Madinah
- Umm al-Qura University

==== Sudan ====
- University of the Holy Quran and Islamic Sciences
- Omdurman Islamic University

==== Tunisia ====
- University of Ez-Zitouna

==== Uganda ====
- Islamic University in Uganda

==== United States ====
- American Islamic College
- Cordoba University Graduate School of Islamic and Social Sciences
- Zaytuna College

==== United Kingdom ====
- Cambridge Muslim College
- Jamia Al-Karam

==== Yemen ====
- Dar al-Mustafa

== See also ==
- Madrasa
- List of Islamic seminaries
- List of oldest universities in continuous operation
- Medieval university
