= Hafiz Muhammad Ahmad =

British Indian Muslim Scholar (d. 1928)

Shamsul Ulama, Mawlana Hafiz Muhammad Ahmad

8th Vice Chancellor of Darul Uloom Deoband
- In office 1895–1928
- Preceded by: Muhammad Munir Nanautavi
- Succeeded by: Habibur Rahman Usmani

Grand Mufti of Hyderabad State
- In office 1922–1925

Personal details
- Born: 1862 Nanauta, British India
- Died: 18 October 1928 (aged 65–66) Nizamabad railway station, British India
- Children: Muhammad Tayyib Qasmi
- Parent: Muhammad Qasim Nanautavi (father)
- Relatives: Muhammad Salim Qasmi (grandson), Muhammad Sufyan Qasmi (great grandson)

Hafiz Muhammad Ahmad (also known as Muhammad Ahmad Nanautawi) (1862–1928) was an Indian Muslim scholar, who served as the vice chancellor of the Darul Uloom Deoband for thirty five years. He was the Grand Mufti of the Hyderabad State from 1922 to 1925.

== Early life and education ==
Ahmad was born in 1862 in Nanauta into the Siddiqi family; his father was Islamic scholar Muhammad Qasim Nanautawi. He attended Madrasa Manba-ul-Ulum in Gulauthi and then Madrasa Shahi in Moradabad. He later returned to Darul Uloom Deoband where he studied with Mahmud Hasan Deobandi. He studied parts of the Jami` at-Tirmidhi with Muhammad Yaqub Nanautawi and specialized in hadith with Rashid Ahmad Gangohi. He was a disciple of Imdadullah Muhajir Makki.

== Career ==
At Darul Uloom Deoband, he taught Mishkat al-Masabih, Tafsir al-Jalalayn, Sahih Muslim, Sunan ibn Majah for ten years, and served as vice chancellor for 35 years. His students included Anwar Shah Kashmiri, Shabbir Ahmad Usmani, Ubaidullah Sindhi, Hussain Ahmad Madani, Kifayatullah Dehlawi, Sayyid Asghar Hussain Deobandi, Qari Muhammad Tayyib, Muhammad Shafi, Manazir Ahsan Gilani and Syed Fakhruddin Ahmad.

Ahmad was honored with the title of Shamsul Ulama by the British Government of India, which he returned in 1920. He also served as the Grand Mufti of Hyderabad State from 1922 to 1925.

== Death and legacy ==
Ahmad died on 18 October 1928 (Jumad al-Ula 3, 1347 AH) while travelling in a train near Nizamabad Junction railway station and was buried in a special graveyard Khitta-e-Salihin with the consent of Mir Osman Ali Khan. His son Qari Muhammad Tayyib was vice chancellor of Darul Uloom Deoband for fifty years. His other son was Tahir Qasmi, the father of Pakistani qaris Shakir Qasmi, Waheed Zafar Qasmi and Zahir Qasmi.

== See also ==
- List of Deobandis
