= Siddiqi family of Nanauta =

(Balkh, Afghanistan migrant) Family in India

The Siddiqi family of Nanauta are a prominent family based primarily in the town of Nanauta in India. The notable people of this family include Mamluk Ali Nanautawi, Muhammad Qasim Nanautawi, Muhammad Yaqub Nanautawi, Muhammad Tayyib Qasmi, Muhammad Salim Qasmi and Qari Shakir Qasmi.

Muhammad Qasim Nanautawi co-founded the Darul Uloom Deoband, Mazhar Nanautawi co-founded the Mazahir Uloom, Muhammad Tayyib Qasmi co-founded the All India Muslim Personal Law Board and Muhammad Salim Qasmi co-founded the Darul Uloom Waqf, Deoband.

== History ==
During the era of Mughal emperor Shah Jahan, Muḥammad Hāshim arrived to India from Balkh and settled in Nanauta. Shah Jahan granted him a "jagir" likewise was granted to scholarly and saintly figures.

== Lineage ==
The purported lineage of Muḥammad Hāshim is, "Muḥammad Hāshim ibn Shah Muhammad ibn Qadhi Taha ibn Mubarak ibn Amanullah ibn Jamaluddin ibn Qadhi Meeran ibn Mazharuddin ibn Najmuddin Saani ibn Nuruddin Rab'i ibn Qiyamuddin ibn Ziya-ud-din ibn Nuruddin Salis ibn Najmuddin ibn Nuruddin Saani ibn Ruknuddin ibn Rafi-ud-Din ibn Baha'uddin ibn Shihab al-Din ibn Khwaja Yusuf ibn Khalil ibn Sadruddin ibn Ruknuddin Samarqandi ibn Sadruddin al-Haaj ibn Ismaeel ash-Shaheed ibn Nur al-Din al-Qitaal ibn Mahmood ibn Baha al-Din ibn Abd Allah ibn Zakariyyah ibn Nur ibn Sirah ibn Shadi as-Siddiqi ibn Wahid al-Din ibn Mas'ud ibn Abd al-Razzaq ibn Qasim ibn Muhammad ibn Abu Bakr". However, this claimed lineage conflicts with genealogical records of the Nuqaba of the descendants of Abu Bakr which do not record a son named Abd al-Razzaq for al-Qasim ibn Muhammad ibn Abu Bakr, neither do they record a grandson with the name Mas'ud.

== People ==
=== Mamluk Ali Nanautawi ===
Mamluk Ali Nanautawi lived between 1789 and 1851. His nasab (patronymic) is: Mamluk Ali ibn Ahmad Ali ibn Ghulam Sharaf ibn Abdullah ibn Abd al-Fath ibn Muhammad Mu'in ibn Abd al-Sami ibn Muhammad Hashim. During his career, he taught at the Zakir Husain Delhi College. He is credited of being the teacher of all major Indian scholars of his era including Fazlur Rahman Usmani, Muhammad Qasim Nanautawi, Nazir Ahmad Dehlvi, Rashid Ahmad Gangohi, Syed Ahmad Khan and Zakaullah Dehlvi.

His son Muhammad Yaqub Nanautawi served as the first principal of Darul Uloom Deoband from 1866 to 1883. Khalil Ahmad Saharanpuri, the author of Deobandi creed book Al-Muhannad ala al-Mufannad was the son of Mamluk Ali's daughter.

=== Muhammad Qasim Nanautawi ===
Muhammad Qasim Nanautawi lived between 1832 and 1880. His nasab (patronymic) is: Muhammad Qāsim ibn Asad Ali ibn Ghulam Shāh ibn Muhammad Bakhsh ibn Alāuddīn ibn Muhammad Fateh ibn Muhammad Mufti ibn Abd al-Samī ibn Muhammad Hāshim He was one of the major founders of Darul Uloom Deoband, where the Deobandi movement began. His son Hafiz Muhammad Ahmad was a Grand Mufti in the Hyderabad state and served the Darul Uloom Deoband as a vice-chancellor for thirty five years, whilst Ahmad's son Muhammad Tayyib Qasmi occupied the post for a half century. Tayyib has the credit of co-founding All India Muslim Personal Law Board. Pakistani qari's Qari Shakir Qasmi, Waheed Zafar Qasmi and Zahir Qasmi were Hafiz Muhammad Ahmad's grandsons through his son Qari Tahir Qasmi.

Tayyib's son Muhammad Salim Qasmi co-founded the Darul Uloom Waqf, Deoband. Salim's son Muhammad Sufyan Qasmi is the rector of this seminary.

=== Hafiz Lutf Ali ===
Lutf Ali was a cousin brother of Mamluk Ali Nanautawi. His nasab (patronymic) is: Lutf Ali ibn Muḥammad Hasan ibn Ghulam Sharaf ibn Abdullah ibn Abd al-Fath ibn Muhammad Mu'in ibn Abd al-Sami ibn Muhammad Hashim.

Lutf Ali's sons were Mazhar Nanautawi, Muhammad Ahsan Nanautawi and Muhammad Munir Nanautavi. During his career, Ahsan served as the Head professor of Bareilly College's Persian department, whilst Mazhar developed Mazahir Uloom and Munir served as the seventh Vice-chancellor of Darul Uloom Deoband.

== See also ==
- Usmani family of Deoband
- Saud

== Bibliography ==
- Adrawi, Asīr. Mawlāna Muḥammad Qāsim Nanautawi: Hayāt awr Kārnāme [Mawlāna Muḥammad Qāsim Nanautawi: Life and works] (2015 ed.). Deoband: Shaykhul Hind Academy.
