= Qasim Nanawtawi =

Indian Muslim scholar and co-founder of Darul Uloom Deoband

Hujjat al-Islam Qasimul-Uloom wal-Khairat Muhammad Qasim Nanawtawi
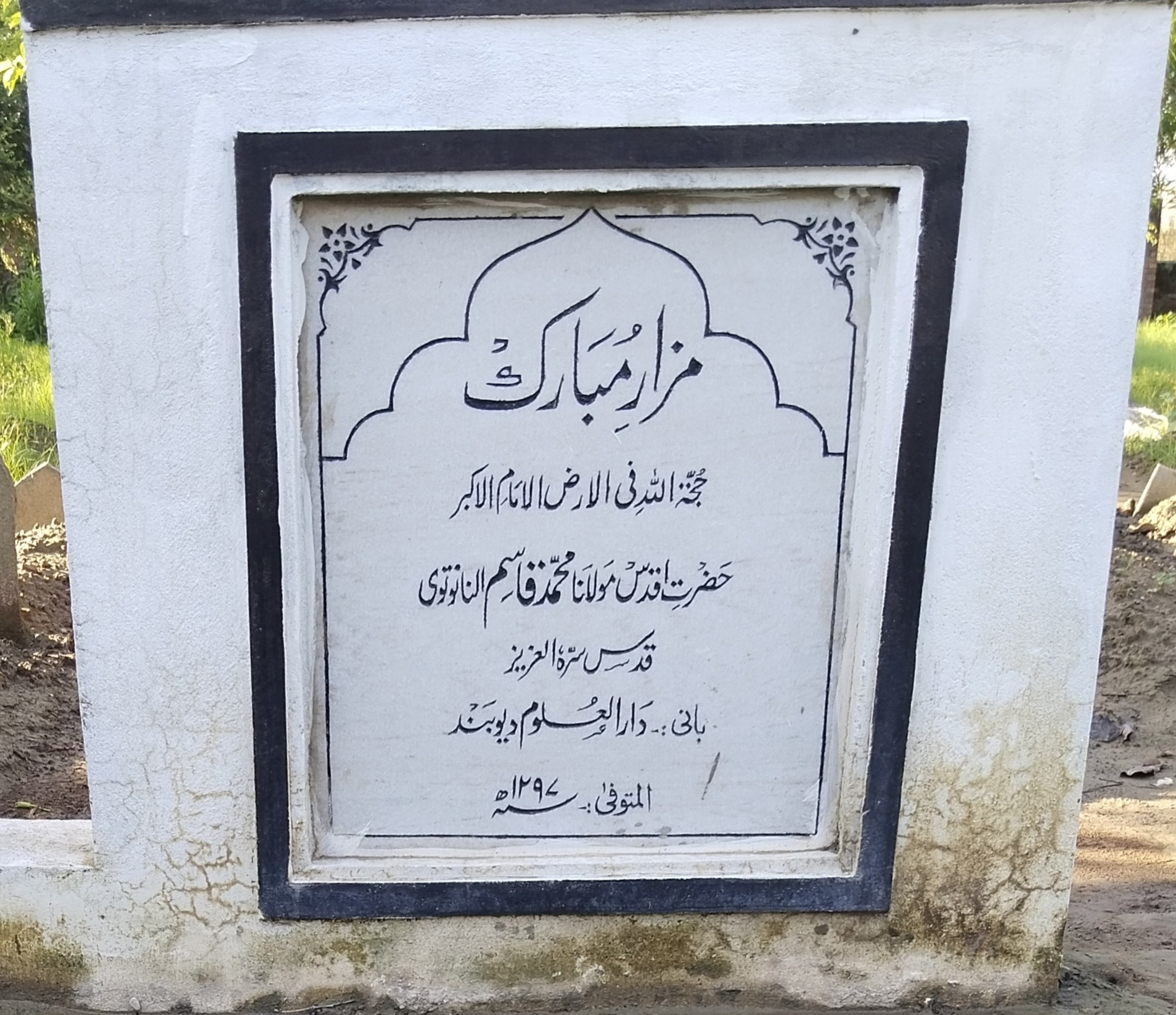

Personal life
- Born: 1832 Nanauta, Mughal Empire
- Died: 15 April 1880 (aged 47–48) Deoband, British India
- Resting place: Mazar-e-Qasmi
- Children: Hafiz Muhammad Ahmad (son)
- Era: Modern era
- Region: Indian Subcontinent
- Main interest(s): Aqidah, Tafsir, Tasawwuf, Hadith, Fiqh, Kifaya, Usul, Ma'aani, Mantiq, Falsafa,
- Notable idea: Widow Re-marriage
- Occupation: Islamic scholar
- Relatives: Siddiqi family of Nanauta; Abu Bakr

Religious life
- Religion: Islam
- Denomination: Sunni
- Founder of: Darul Uloom Deoband, Jamia Qasmia Madrasa Shahi
- Jurisprudence: Hanafi
- Creed: Maturidi
- Movement: Deobandi

Muslim leader
- Influenced: Mahmud Hasan Deobandi, Ahmad Hasan Amrohi, Abdul Wahid Bengali, Deoband alumni
- Military career
- Service years: 1857
- Conflicts: Indian War of Independence: Battle of Shamli

Muhammad Qasim Nanawtawi (1832 – 15 April 1880) (Urdu: مولانا محمد قاسم نانوتوی) was an Indian Sunni Hanafi Maturidi Islamic Scholar, theologian and a Sufi who was one of the main founders of the Deobandi Movement, starting from the Darul Uloom Deoband.

== Name and lineage ==
His ism (given name) was Muhammad Qasim. His nasab (patronymic) is: Muhammad Qāsim ibn Asad Ali ibn Ghulam Shāh ibn Muhammad Bakhsh ibn Alāuddīn ibn Muhammad Fateh ibn Muhammad Mufti ibn Abd al-Samī (Note: At Abd al-Samī, the nasab of Nanautawi meets with that of Mamluk Ali Nanautawi.) ibn Muhammad Hāshim

His "nasab" meets Qasim ibn Muhammad ibn Abi Bakr after 44 links.

== Early life and education ==
Nanautawi was born in 1832 (either in Sha'ban or Ramadan, 1248 AH) into the Siddiqi family of Nanauta, a town near Saharanpur, India.

Nanautawi was schooled at Nanauta, where he memorized the Quran and learned calligraphy. Aged nine, Nanautawi moved to Deoband where he studied at the madrasa of Karamat Hussain. The teacher at this "madrasa" was Mahtab Ali Deobandi, the uncle of Mahmud Hasan Deobandi. Under the instruction of Mehtab Ali, Nanautawi completed the primary books of Arabic grammar and syntax. Thereafter, his mother sent him to Saharanpur, where his maternal grandfather Wajīhuddīn Wakīl, who was a poet of Urdu and Persian, lived. Wakīl enrolled his grandson in the Persian class of Muḥammad Nawāz Sahāranpūri, under whom, Nanautawi, then aged twelve, completed Persian studies.

In 1844, Nanautawi joined the Delhi College, where he studied with Mamluk Ali Nanautawi. According to Asir Adrawi, "Nanautawi although was enrolled in the college, he would take private classes at his teachers home, instead of the college". He studied the major books with Mamluk Ali, including "mantiq" and philosophy, and few other books with Mufti Sadruddīn. Manazir Ahsan Gilani has tried to reconcile the reports concerning Nanautawi's education at the college. He says that, the name of Nanautawi appeared in the official registry of the college in the first year and argues, "whatsoever it is, but it is not right that he gained education there, since the starting". Nanautawi stayed in Delhi for around five or six years, and graduated, aged seventeen. Gīlāni says that, Nanautawi studied with Mamluk Ali Nanautawi, but not the syllabus of the college, rather studied at his home. It is commonly accepted that Nanautawi did not appear in the college exams.

== Career ==
=== Academic career ===
After the completion of his education, Nanautavi became the editor of the press at Matbah-e-Ahmadi. During this period, at Ahmad Ali's insistence, he wrote a scholium on the last few portions of Sahihul Bukhari. Before the establishment of Darul Uloom Deoband, he taught Euclid for some time at the Chhatta Masjid. His lectures were delivered at the printing press. His teaching produced a group of accomplished Ulama, the example of which had not been seen since Shah Abdul Ghani's time.

In 1860, he performed Hajj and, on his return, he accepted a profession of collating books at Matbah-e-Mujtaba in Meerut. Nanautavi remained attached to this press until 1868. He performed Hajj for the second time and then accepted a job at Matbah-e-Hashimi in Meerut.

=== Political and revolutionary activities ===
He participated in the Indian Rebellion of 1857 in the Battle of Shamli between the British and the anti-colonialist ulema. The scholars were ultimately defeated at that battle.

=== Establishment of Islamic schools ===
He established Darul Uloom Deoband in 1866 with the financial help and funding of the Muslim states within India and the rich individuals of the Muslim Indian community.

He conformed to the Shari'a and worked to motivate other people to do so. It was through his work that a prominent madrasa was established in Deoband and a mosque was built in 1868. Through his efforts, Islamic schools were established at various other locations as well.

His greatest achievement was the revival of an educational movement for the renaissance of religious sciences in India and the creation of guiding principles for the madaris (schools). Under his attention and supervision, madaris were established in areas such as Thanabhavan, Galautti, Kerana, Danapur, Meerut, and Muradabad. Most of them still exist, rendering educational and religious services in their vicinity. Funding of these religious schools initially was done by the rulers of the Muslim states and the rich individuals of the Muslim Indian community.

Under Muhammad Qasim Nanautvi's guidance, these religious schools, at least in the beginning, remained distant from politics and devoted their services to providing only religious education to Muslim children. The curriculum at these schools was studying the Quran, Hadith, Islamic law, and logic.

Jamia Qasmia Madrasa Shahi was established under his supervision.

== Death and legacy ==
Nanautavi died on 15 April 1880 at the age of 47. His grave is to the north of the Darul-Uloom. Since Qasim Nanautavi is buried there, the place is known as Qabrastan-e-Qasimi, where countless Deobandi scholars, students, and others are buried. Well-known Muslim educationist of that time Syed Ahmad Khan had great respect for Nanautavi and wrote an emotional and long article on his death.

He has been given the title of Hujjat al-Islam by his followers.

== Family ==
Nanautavi's son Hafiz Muhammad Ahmad was a Grand Mufti of Hyderabad State from 1922 to 1925 and served as the Vice Chancellor of Deoband seminary for thirty five years.

Nanautawi's grandson Muhammad Tayyib Qasmi served as the Vice Chancellor of Deoband seminary for more than five decades and co-founded the All India Muslim Personal Law Board, while Tayyib's son Muhammad Salim Qasmi founded the Darul Uloom Waqf seminary. Salim's son Muhammad Sufyan Qasmi is the rector of Darul Uloom Waqf.

== Publications ==
- Aab-i Hayat (commentary on the life of the prophet Muhammad
- Tahzir al-Nas
- Mubahisah Shahjahanpur
- Tasfiyat al-Aqa'id
- Tauseeq-ul-Kalam
- Sadaqat-i- Islam

== See also ==
- Bibliography of Qasim Nanawtawi
