= Hasheem Ahmad Siddiqui =

Indian scholar (born 1997)

Mufti Hasheem Ahmad Siddiqui

Shahar Qazi of Dehradun
- Incumbent
- Assumed office 28 November 2025
- Preceded by: Mohammad Ahmad Qasmi

Personal life
- Born: 28 December 1997 (age 28) Deoband, Uttar Pradesh, India
- Region: India
- Education: Darul Uloom Waqf Deoband, National Institute of Open Schooling, Maulana Azad National Urdu University

Religious life
- Religion: Islam
- Denomination: Sunni
- Jurisprudence: Hanafi
- Movement: Deobandi

Hasheem Ahmad Siddiqui (also known as Mufti Hasheem Ahmad Qasmi; born 28 December 1997) is an Indian Islamic scholar and religious cleric based in Dehradun, Uttarakhand. He has served as the Shahar Qazi of Dehradun since November 2025.

== Early life and education ==
Hasheem Ahmad Qasmi was born on 28 December 1997 in Deoband, Uttar Pradesh. He received religious education at Darul Uloom Waqf Deoband and also studied through the National Institute of Open Schooling and Maulana Azad National Urdu University.

He began his religious career in Deoband, where he was associated with the Hujjatul Islam Academy and later served as an imam at Kamal Shah Masjid. In November 2023, he was appointed deputy imam of Jama Masjid Paltan Bazaar in Dehradun.

== Shahar Qazi of Dehradun ==
Following the death of Dehradun's Shahar Qazi Mohammad Ahmad Qasmi on 22 November 2025, the management committee of Jama Masjid Paltan Bazaar announced Hasheem Ahmad Qasmi as the new Shahar Qazi on 28 November 2025. The announcement was made after Friday prayers, and he was also announced as imam of Jama Masjid Paltan Bazaar and Eidgah at Bindal Bridge. According to the committee, the decision followed consultations with worshippers, religious scholars and other community representatives. Some individuals and organisations subsequently congratulated him on the appointment.

The appointment initially became the subject of a dispute. The Uttarakhand Waqf Board directed the Jama Masjid management to cancel the appointment, questioning the authority of the management committee and the procedure followed. A proposed meeting of religious scholars and community representatives to discuss the matter was subsequently postponed.

In the months that followed, Qasmi continued to be identified in regional media reports as the Shahar Qazi of Dehradun. He appeared in that capacity in connection with religious observances and community matters. In December 2025, community representatives also met him and conveyed their congratulations following his appointment.

== Public activities and initiatives ==
As Shahar Qazi, Qasmi has made public statements on religious observances, social practices and matters concerning religious institutions.

In December 2025, he spoke against dowry and unnecessary expenditure in marriage ceremonies and announced that nikah could be conducted in mosques without a fee. He also advocated simpler marriage ceremonies.

He has also commented on issues relating to marriage and Islamic personal practices. In May 2026, while speaking on triple talaq and halala, he described instantaneous triple talaq as contrary to Islamic principles and opposed the practice of halala.

During religious occasions, Qasmi has issued guidance concerning worship and public arrangements. During Eid al-Adha in May 2026, he appealed to people to observe the festival peacefully, maintain cleanliness, follow administrative directions and avoid sharing videos of animal sacrifice on social media.

Another initiative associated with his office concerns the verification of madrasas seeking to collect donations in Dehradun and surrounding areas. In August 2026, Hindustan reported on a proposed Tasdeeq Nama system under which madrasas would provide information and documents relating to registration, land and buildings, students, educational activities, staff, audit reports, expenditure and donation receipts. The reported system also provided for record-keeping and annual renewal. Qasmi said the purpose was to improve transparency and strengthen confidence in the donation process.

The verification process was also reported by TV10 India, which described the submission of recognition documents, land records, audit reports, GPS photographs and classroom videos, with physical verification where required. The report attributed the initiative to the office of the Shahar Qazi.

Qasmi has also continued to deliver religious addresses in his capacity as Shahar Qazi. In April 2026, at Jama Masjid Paltan Bazaar, he spoke about the spiritual and social dimensions of Hajj, including humility, equality, brotherhood and compassion.

In September 2026, he was also quoted by Hindustan in connection with the sighting of the Islamic lunar month of Rabi al-Thani, announcing the beginning of the month after the crescent was not sighted.
