= National Council for Promotion of Urdu Language =

Agency overview
- Formed: 1 April 1996; 30 years ago
- Jurisdiction: Government of India
- Headquarters: Delhi, India
- Agency executive: Shri Pralhad Joshi; Dr Shams Iqbal
- Website: urducouncil.nic.in

The National Council for Promotion of Urdu Language (Urdu: قومی کونسل برائے فروغ اردو زبان, Qaumī Kaunsil barā-yi Farōġ-i Urdū Zabān NCPUL) is an autonomous regulatory body in the Government of India. It is the main authority of Urdu language and education in India, being one of two authorities responsible for the regulation of Urdu, the other being the National Language Authority of Pakistan. The National Council for Promotion of Urdu Language (NCPUL) is an autonomous body under the Ministry of Education, Department of Secondary and Higher Education, Government of India. Set up to promote, develop and propagate Urdu language, Council started its operation in Delhi on 1 April 1996. In its capacity as the National Nodal Agency for the promotion of the Urdu language NCPUL is the principal coordinating and monitoring authority for promotion of Urdu language and Urdu education.

== See also ==
- Jamiatul Qasim Darul Uloom Al-Islamiah
- DD Urdu
- Geographic Distribution of Urdu
- Languages of India
- Dakhni
- Urdu in Aurangabad
