= Nahdlatul Ulama Islamic University =

University in Central Java, Indonesia

- Universitas Islam Nahdlatul Ulama
- Former names: INISNU, STIENU & STTDNU
- Motto: The Inspiring University
- Type: Private
- Established: 1991
- Rector: Prof. Dr. Abdul Djamil, M.A.
- Academic staff: 183 Lecturer of 6 faculties
- Students: 10.188 (2019/2020)
- Undergraduates: 9844
- Postgraduates: 344
- Location: St. Taman Siswa (pekeng), Jepara Regency, Central Java, 59427, Indonesia; 6°36′58″S 110°41′33″E
- Colors: Dark Green
- Nickname: UNISNU Jepara
- Website: http://www.unisnu.ac.id

The Nahdlatul Ulama Islamic University (Indonesian: Universitas Islam Nahdlatul Ulama, Arabic: جامعة نهضة العلماء الإسلامية), abbreviated UNISNU, is a private university in the city of Jepara, Central Java, Indonesia. The university is located in Tahunan an area of Jepara, Central Java.

UNISNU has five faculties and graduate programs: faculty of economics and business, faculty of tarbiyah and gurus, faculty of da'wah and communication, faculty of sharia and law, faculty of science and technology and graduate programs.

== Faculties ==
The university have five faculties and graduate program:

- Faculty of Economics and Business
- Faculty of Tarbiyah and Gurus
- Faculty of Da'wah and Communication
- Faculty of Sharia and Law
- Faculty of Science and Technology
- Graduate Programs

== See also ==
- List of Islamic educational institutions
