= Jamiatul Qasim Darul Uloom Al-Islamiah =

Islamic seminary in India

Coordinates: 28.56474°N 77.28843°E

Jamiatul Qasim Darul Uloom -il-Islamia
- Type: Islamic university
- Established: 1989 (1409 Hijri)
- Affiliations: Darul Uloom Deoband
- Administrative staff: 75
- Students: 4500
- Location: At & Po. Madhubani, G.P.O. Partap Ganj, Supaul, Bihar, India
- Campus: Rural (25 acres)

Jamiatul Qasim Darul Uloom -il-Islamia is an Islamic seminary in India. The Jamia was established by Mufti Mahfoozur Rahman Usmani, an Islamic scholar of India in 1989 at the Indo-Nepal border, in Supaul, Bihar. The Jamia also serves as a center for National Council for Promotion of Urdu Language and National Institute of Electronics & Information Technology.

There are 15 Qur'anic centres under the supervision of Jamiatul Qasim Darul Uloom -il-Islamia and 25 branches of the Jamia spread over the state of Bihar.

== History ==
In January 2017, the students and teachers of the Jamia formed a human chain in support of the Alcohol prohibition in Bihar.

The Alimiat Degree of this madrasa has been recognized along with 50 other Arabic madrasas by Jamia Millia Islamia and Aligarh Muslim University In 2016, the Jamia organized Rushd-o-Hidayat conference under the guardianship of Ahmed Bukhari. It was attended by notable scholars including Muhammad Salim Qasmi, Akhtarul Wasey Muhammad Sufyan Qasmi. In 2016, the Jamia organized a national level seminar along with National Council for Promotion of Urdu Language. The national seminar was attended by Iqtedar Mohammad Khan, Head of the Islamic Studies department of Jamia Millia Islamia.

The Jamia organized a Millat Convention program in 2018 which was attended by politicians like Tejashwi Yadav. This event was also attended by Hamid bin Akram al-Bukhari, a lecturer of Al-Masjid an-Nabawi. An International seminar was organized in collaboration with the Islamic Studies department of Jamia Millia Islamia one the life and works Islamic scholar Muhammad Salim Qasmi. The seminar was held in the Ansari auditorium of the Jamia Millia Islamia and was attended by scholars like Akhtarul Wasey. A book on the 30-year history of Jamiatul Qasim was also released in this event.

== Patrons ==
- Muhammad Salim Qasmi (former)
- Saeed-ur-Rahman Azmi Nadvi, Principal Darul Uloom Nadwatul Ulama
- Shahid Saharanpuri, Professor of Hadith Mazahir Uloom

== Publications ==
The Jamia has published a number of books including:

- Jamiatul Qasim Darul Uloom -il-Islamia publishes a monthly magazine called Ma'arif-e-Qasim.
- Shaykh Muhammad Yunus Jaunpuri: Nuqoosh-o-Ta’assurat, Tarikhi Dastawez
- Muhammad Salim Qasmi Ki Zindagi ke 92 Saal.

== See also ==
- Darul Uloom London
- Darul Uloom Karachi
- Al-Jamiatul Ahlia Darul Ulum Moinul Islam
- Jamiah Darul Uloom Zahedan
