= Jamia Imam Muhammad Anwar Shah =

Indian Islamic University

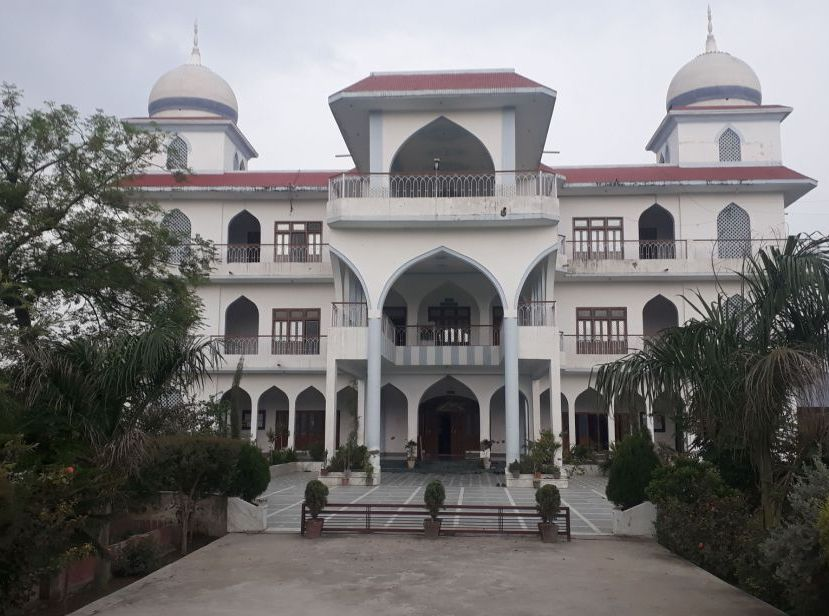
- Academic block (Anwar Hall) of Jamia Imam Anwar
- Type: Islamic university
- Established: 1997 (29 years ago)
- Founder: Anzar Shah Kashmiri
- Chancellor: Ahmed Khizer Shah Kashmiri
- Location: Deoband, Saharanpur, Uttar Pradesh, India
- Campus: Deoband
- Nickname: Jamia Imam

Jamia Imam Muhammad Anwar Shah is an Islamic seminary situated in Deoband, Saharanpur, Uttar Pradesh.

== History ==
Jamia Imam Muhammad Anwar Shah was established by Anzar Shah Kashmiri in 1997. It is named after the Indian hadith scholar Anwar Shah Kashmiri. The Jamia follows the dars-e-nizami syllabus.

Indian poet Fuzail Ahmad Nasiri is the current Vice-Administrator of Education and Hadith professor of Jamia.

== Publications ==
- Monthly Muhaddis-e-Asr (Urdu)
