= Qazi Mu'tasim Billah =

Bangladeshi Islamic scholar

Muḥaddith al-ʿAẓīm Qazi Mu'tasim Billah
- কাজী মুতাসিম বিল্লাহ

Personal life
- Born: Qazi Mu'tasim Billah Bahar; 15 June 1933 Kaliganj, Jessore District, Bengal Presidency
- Died: 15 July 2013 (aged 80) Dhaka, Bangladesh
- Resting place: Shahjahanpur Graveyard, Dhaka
- Parent: Qazi Sakhawat Husayn (father)
- Education: Darul Uloom Deoband

Religious life
- Religion: Islam
- Denomination: Sunni
- Jurisprudence: Hanafi
- Tariqa: Chishti (Sabiri-Imdadi); Naqshbandi; Qadri; Suhrawardy
- Movement: Deobandi

Muslim leader
- Teacher: Hussain Ahmad Madani; Ibrahim Balyawi; Izaz Ali Amrohi; Muhammad Tayyib Qasmi
- Disciple of: Hussain Ahmad Madani; Tajammul Ali
- Students: Mahmudul Hasan Muhammad Wakkas Farid Uddin Masood Abdul Jabbar Jahanabadi Azhar Ali Anwar Shah Ataur Rahman Khan Abul Fattah Yahya Muhammad Nuruddin Khalilur Rahman Barnavi Ishaq Faridi Abdullah Haripuri Abdur Rahman Hafezji Abu Saber Abdullah Abul Bashar Saiful Islam
- Influenced by: Abdullah Darkhawasti

Principal of Jamia Shar'iyya Malibagh
- In office 1969–2013
- Succeeded by: Ashraf Ali

Principal of Jamia Islamia Darul Uloom Madania
- In office 1969–1977
- Succeeded by: Tajammul Ali

Personal details
- Party: Jamiat Ulema-e-Islam

Qazi Mu'tasim Billah Bahar (Bengali: কাজী মুতাসিম বিল্লাহ বাহার; 15 June 1933 – 15 July 2013) was a Bangladeshi Islamic scholar, teacher, author and politician. He was the principal of Jamia Shar'iyya Malibagh for over four decades, a former professor at the University of Dhaka and the founding principal of Jamia Islamia Darul Uloom Madania in Jatrabari, Dhaka. He has written many books and articles in the Bengali language and pioneered the introduction of a Bengali-medium among the Qawmi madrasas of Bangladesh.

== Early life and family ==
Qazi Mu'tasim Billah Bahar was born on 15 June 1933, to a Bengali Muslim family of Qadis in the village of Gopalpur in Kaliganj, Jhenaidah subdivision, which was then a part of the Bengal Presidency's Jessore District. Other sources claim that he was born in the village of Zamzampur in Jessore Sadar. His father, Qazi Sakhawat Husayn, was an Islamic scholar and politician, and his mother's name was Qurratun Nesa. His grandfather, Qazi Abdul Wadud, and great-grandfather, Qazi Rawshan Ali, were also prominent Sufis in the greater Jessore region.

== Education ==
Mu'tasim Billah's education began under his parents, and then at the Gopalpur primary school. He studied there until class 2, when he moved to his maternal home where he studied until class 4. After that, Mu'tasim Billah became a student at his father's workplace, the Lauri-Ramnagar Alia Madrasa in Manirampur where he completed his Fazil qualification. In 1953, he set off for Hindustan after Ramadan to study at the Darul Uloom Deoband seminary in Saharanpur, where he enrolled at the Faculty of Arts. In 1956, he enrolled at the Faculty of Hadith studies and gained a sanad from Hussain Ahmad Madani. Among his teachers in Deoband were Hussain Ahmed Madani, Ibrahim Balyawi, Izaz Ali Amrohi and Muhammad Tayyib Qasmi, Bashir Ahmad Khan and Jalil Ahmad Kairanvi. In Bangladesh, he studied under Tajammul Ali, Qamaruddin Silhati and Ashraf Ali Dharmanduli.

== Teaching career ==
Mu'tasim Billah returned to Bengal in 1957 after graduating, and began his career as a teacher at the Lauri-Ramnagar Alia Madrasa. In 1959, he joined the Bara Katara Madrasa in Dhaka, and subsequently the Jamia Imdadia in Kishoreganj in 1962. He was appointed as the Shaykh al-Hadith (Professor of Hadith studies) of the Katlasen Alia Madrasa in Mymensingh towards the end of 1966. Mu'tasim Billah established his own madrasa, the Jamia Islamia Darul Uloom Madania in 1969 at the suggestion of Abdullah Darkhawasti. From its establishment, he served as its principal and Shaykh al-Hadith for eight years. He then returned to Katlasen Alia Madrasa in 1977. He also served as a teacher at the Jamia Hussainia Arzabad madrasa in Mirpur for one year in 1979. The following year, Mu'tasim Billah was appointed as the principal of Jamia Shar'iyya Malibagh. During his time in Malibagh, he was also a professor at the University of Dhaka's department of Islamic Studies where he covered Sahih Muslim. He resigned after one and half years as a result of violations of religious precepts in teaching authority. Towards the start of 1992, he was a teacher at the Daratana Madrasa in Jessore, and the principal and Shaykh al-Hadith of Jamia Islamia Tantibazar in 1994. He returned to his two positions at Malibagh in 1997, and served there for the rest of his life.

He also travelled across the country often to give public speeches. Among his famous speeches is the one-hour Mizan Maydan speech in Feni and his six-hour Seerah speech in Bhaluka, Mymensingh.

== Literary contributions ==
Mu'tasim Billah is credited for popularising the use of the native Bengali language within the Islamic education system of Bangladesh. Immediately returning form Deoband in 1957, he formulated a Bengali-medium system for Qawmi madrasas in erstwhile East Pakistan. Mu'tasim Billah was known to have studied the works of many Bengali authors such as Qazi Nazrul Islam and Farrukh Ahmad, and initiated a culture of Bengali newspapers, annual magazines and literary conferences within the madrasa ecosystem. He inspired a generation of writers among Bangladeshi scholars. Although he was criticized in the contemporary era for changing the traditional method, later the practice of his thought spread throughout the madrasa ecosystem. He was the first to shape the curriculum of the Qawmi madrasas in such a manner. Among his other activities was the exclusion of the elementary prose literature book "al-Ḳalyūbī" from the syllabus and the inclusion of the Qasas an-Nabiyyin in the syllabus.

He was known to have memorised hundreds of poems in Bengali, Arabic, Urdu and Persian. Many of his works pertaining to tafsir and hadith have been published by the Islamic Foundation Bangladesh as well as annotated translations of the Qur'an and the Kutub al-Sittah. Mu'tasim Billah was also a member of the Islami Bishwakosh's editorial board. Although most of his works are in Bengali, he also wrote in the Arabic and Urdu languages. In his final year the Urdu-medium Darul Uloom Deoband, he competed in an annual writing competition where he wrote a research paper titled "Mawjuda Aalmi Kashmakash Aur Us Ka Hal". Six of his works have been published, with three remaining unpublished in Bengali, Urdu and Arabic respectively.

Mu'tasim Billah was a long-time member of the Islamic Foundation Bangladesh's editorial board, having edited 42 of the Foundation's books and reviewed 51 books. Among his written works are:

1. ইসলামের দৃষ্টিতে জন্ম নিয়ন্ত্রণ (Islamer Drishtite Jonmo Niyontron)
2. বৈচিত্র্যের মাঝে ঐক্যের সুর (Boichtrer Majhe Oikker Shur, two volumes)
3. জমিয়ত পরিচিতি (Jamiat Parichiti)
4. Kitab al-Adab (Bengali translation)
5. Tanwir al-Mishkat (Bengali translation with annotations)
6. Hedaya (Bengali translation of Kitab al-Athar volume 4)
7. মসজিদের মর্মবাণী (Masjider Mormobani, Bengali translation)
8. রদ্দে মওদুদিয়্যাত (Radd-e-Mawdudiyyat, unpublished refutation)
9. বৈচিত্র্যের মাঝে ঐক্যের সুর (Boichtrer Majhe Oikker Shur, remaining volumes)

== Political career ==
Mu'tasim Billah was never associated with politics in his student life, although his family were actively connected with the Jamiat Ulema-e-Hind and Indian National Congress. His father would take him to Jamiat conferences advocating against partition, and his paternal and maternal grandfathers were also Jamiat members. His murshid Hussain Ahmad Madani was the President of the party. After the independence of Pakistan, Mu'tasim Billah became a member of the Jamiat Ulema-e-Islam's central committee and constitution formulation subcommittee. During the Bangladesh War of Independence, he played an active role for the welfare of Bengalis and declared the deceased pro-independence fighters as martyrs and harassed women as mazluma. Following independence, he publicly opposed the politics of Syed Nazrul Islam and Tajuddin Ahmad. He met with President Sheikh Mujibur Rahman alongside Asad Madni and Abdur Rashid Tarkabagish, and Madni requested that the president allows the re-opening of madrasas in Bangladesh, explaining that the Muslim world is not having positive opinions about him. Mu'tasim Billah then consoled the president stating that the general scholars of Bangladesh were free from anti-independent movements and that they should not be harassed. Sheikh Mujibur Rahman promised Mu'tasim Billah that he will take his request on board.

== Personal life ==
After completing his studies in Deoband, Mu'tasim Billah pledged bay'ah to Hussain Ahmad Madani in 1957. Despite being a Hanafi, Madani used to refer to Mu'tasim Billah as a "Mujtahid of the fourteenth century A. H.". Madani died on 5 December of that year and he then returned to Bengal two to three months later. In Bengal, he became a murid of Tajammul Ali, who later granted him khilafat (spiritual succession).

On 12 June 1959, Mu'tasim Billah married the daughter of Shah Sufi Haji Abdul Hamid of Collegepara in Magura. They had four sons and one daughter (d. 2011). His eldest son, Qazi Arif Billah is a teacher at the Mahbub Hefzkhana and his second son, Qazi Mahmud, is a mosque and madrasa custodian. His third son, Mawlana Qazi Mansur, is based in Saudi Arabia and his fourth son, Qazi Maruf, is based in Jessore.

== Death and legacy ==
Mu'tasim Billah died on 15 July 2013. His janaza was performed in Khilgaon Balur Math by his student Abdur Rahman Hafezji of Mymensingh at noon. After the prayer, he was buried at the Shahjahanpur Graveyard in Dhaka. In 2017, the Jamia Shariyyah Malibagh madrasa published a book in memory of his life and contributions.

== See also ==
- Abul Hasan Jashori
- Muhammad Wakkas
