= Izaz Ali Amrohi =

Indian Sunni Muslim scholar

Shaykh al-Adab wal Fiqh Izaz Ali Amrohi
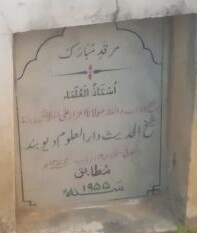
- Inscription on Izaz Ali Amrohi's grave in the Qasmi Cemetery in Deoband

2nd Head Mufti of Darul Uloom Deoband
- In office 1928 to 1929
- Preceded by: Aziz-ul-Rahman Usmani
- Succeeded by: Riyazuddin Bijnori

9th Head Mufti of Darul Uloom Deoband
- In office 1944 to 1946
- Preceded by: Farooq Ahmad
- Succeeded by: Mahdi Hasan Shahjahanpuri

Personal life
- Born: November 1882 Amroha, British India
- Died: 1955 (aged 72–73) Deoband, India
- Resting place: Mazar-e-Qasmi, Deoband
- Region: India
- Main interest(s): Arabic literature, Fiqh
- Notable work(s): Nafhat al-Arab, al-Ahadith al-mawdu’ah
- Education: Darul Uloom Deoband
- Occupation: Jurist

Religious life
- Religion: Islam
- Denomination: Sunni
- Jurisprudence: Hanafi
- Movement: Deobandi

Muslim leader
- Students: Shah Abdul Wahhab Shamsul Haque Faridpuri Abul Hasan Jashori Qazi Mu'tasim Billah Sultan Ahmad Nanupuri Naseer Ahmad Khan
- Influenced: Anzar Shah Kashmiri, Muhammad Shafi, Nur Uddin Gohorpuri

Izaz Ali Amrohi (Urdu: اعزاز علی امروہوی; November 1882 – 1955) was an Indian Islamic scholar who served as the second and ninth Head Mufti of the Darul Uloom Deoband. His book Nafahtul Arab is taught in madrassas including the Darul Uloom Deoband.

== Biography ==
Izaz Ali Amrohi was born in November 1882 in Amroha, into the Kamboh Nawab family. He studied Quran with Qutbuddin, and memorized it under the supervision of Hafiz Sharfuddin. He learnt Persian from his father and studied primary books of dars-e-nizami at Madrasa Arbi Gulshan Faiz in Tilhar with Maqsood Ali Khan. He then moved to Madrasa Ayn-ul-Ilm, where he studied Mulla Jami and Kanzud Daqaiq with Qari Basheer Ahmad and Persian and Fiqh books such as Sharah Wiqayah with Kifayatullah Dihlawi. At the request of Qari Basheer Ahmad and Kifayatullah Dihlawi, Ali moved to the Darul Uloom Deoband where he studied with Hafiz Muhammad Ahmad, the then vice chancellor of Darul Uloom Deoband and Muhammad Sahool Bhagalpuri.

Ali was about to complete one year in Deoband, that he travelled to Meerut, where he met Aashiq Elahi Meerthi. At Meerthi's request, he stayed at Meerut and studied the books of "aruuz" and "usool" with him, while books of logic, philosophy, and the books of Kutub al-Sittah, except Sahih Bukhari with Abdul Momin Deobandi. He moved to Deoband again and studied Sahih Bukhari, Tirmidhi, Sunan Abu Dawud and Baydawi with Mahmud Hasan Deobandi. Ali specialized in Islamic jurisprudence under Azizur Rahman Usmani and studied Arabic literature with Muizuddin Ahmad. He graduated from the Darul Uloom Deoband in 1903.

After his graduation from the Darul Uloom Deoband, Mahmud Hasan Deobandi sent him to Madrassa Nomaniyah, in Pureni, Bhagalpur where he taught for over seven years. Then he moved to Shahjahanpur and established Afzal al-Madaris in a mosque where he taught for nearly three years without taking any fees. Ali was appointed a teacher in the Darul Uloom Deoband in 1911, where he taught elementary books of Arabic such as Ilm al-Sigha, Nur al-Izah during the first year. His academic career in the Darul Uloom lasted for over 44 years. He served as the Head Mufti of Darul Uloom Deoband twice: first time from 1928 to 1929 and second time from 1944 to 1946 and about 24,855 fatwas were written under his authority. He taught Sahih al-Bukhari in the absence of Hussain Ahmad Madani and in the last phase of his life, he also taught the second volume of Tirmidhi for several years. His students include Muhammad Shafi, Anzar Shah Kashmiri, Muhammad Salim Qasmi and Rasheed Ahmad Ludhianvi.

Ali died in 1955 and was buried in Qasmi graveyard of the Darul Uloom Deoband. His student Anzar Shah Kashmiri has written his biography, entitled Tadhkiratul Izaz.

== Literary works ==
Izaz Ali Amrohi wrote Nafhat al-Arab, a book taught in the contemporary dars-e-nizami curriculum including Darul Uloom Deoband. His other books include al-Ahadith al-mawdu’ah

== See also ==
- List of Deobandis

Religious titles
| Preceded by Aziz-ul-Rahman Usmani | 2nd Head Mufti of Darul Uloom Deoband; 1928 - 1929 | Succeeded by Riyazuddin Bijnori |
| Preceded by Farooq Ahmad | 9th Head Mufti of Darul Uloom Deoband; 1944 - 1946 | Succeeded by Mahdi Hasan Shahjahanpuri |
