= Abdul Matin Chowdhury (scholar) =

Bengali religious scholar and political activist

- Title: Maulana, Allamah, Shaikh-e-Fulbari

Personal life
- Born: 1915 Golapganj, Assam Province, British India
- Died: 19 February 1990 (aged 74–75) Sylhet Division, Bangladesh
- Resting place: Mir Hazara Graveyard, Fulbari, Sylhet Division, Bangladesh
- Era: Modern
- Education: Darul Uloom Deoband
- Relatives: Ejaz Ahmed Chowdhury

Religious life
- Religion: Islam
- Denomination: Sunni
- Jurisprudence: Hanafi
- Tariqa: Chishti (Sabiri-Imdadi); Naqshbandi; Qadri; Suhrawardy
- Creed: Maturidi
- Movement: Deobandi
- Profession: Islamic scholar, political activist

Muslim leader
- Teacher: Hussain Ahmad Madani
- Disciples: Zia Uddin
- Influenced: Nur Uddin Gohorpuri Emdadul Haque Amin Uddin Shaikh-e-Ketia

Abdul Matin Chowdhury (Bengali: আব্দুল মতিন চৌধুরী; 1915 – 19 February 1990), popularly known as Shaikh-e-Fulbari (Bengali: শায়খে ফুলবাড়ী, lit. 'Shaikh of Fulbari'), was a Bengali religious scholar and political activist. A disciple of Hussain Ahmad Madani, he later gained his own following and was politically involved during the partition of India and independence of Bangladesh.

== Early life and background ==
Abdul Matin Chowdhury was born in 1915 to a Zamindar family in the village of Fulbari, Golapganj, in what is now Sylhet District, Bangladesh. He was the youngest of the six children of Rizwan Uddin Chowdhury and Khair-un-nessa Chowdhury. His father's family traced their descent from Abdullah ibn Ja'far, a nephew of the fourth Rashidun caliph, Ali ibn Abi Talib.

After being orphaned at the age of eight, Chowdhury initially lived with his elder sister, before coming under the care of his maternal uncle in the village of Ronokali. In 1928, he was introduced to Hussain Ahmad Madani, who had been familiar with his late father. Having impressed Madani with his religious piety and enthusiasm, Chowdhury returned with him to Uttar Pradesh, where he became enrolled at Darul Uloom Deoband, a prominent Islamic university. During this time, he developed a close relationship with Madani, whose home he stayed at during his education, later becoming his religious disciple. (Note: As a result of this intimacy, Chowdhury was said to have been commonly mistaken as Madani's son.) Chowdhury graduated from the university after nine years, having had proven a competency in Hadiths, Tafsir and Arabic literature among others.

== Political and religious career ==
Under Madani's instructions, he took part and became a leader in the Indian independence movement. Following the Partition of India in 1947, Chowdhury supported the development of the newly created Pakistan, working alongside the leadership of the Jamiat Ulema-e-Hind organisation. After Bangladesh declared independence in 1971, he attempted to prevent incidents of violence against people by the Pakistani military. When fifty of his relatives in Ronokali were cornered by the army, Chowdhury successfully appealed to the soldiers to spare them. On another occasion, he was able to intervene to save the lives of seven Hindus under similar circumstances. Chowdhury subsequently played an active part in the Bangladesh Khilafat movement, working under the leadership of Hafezzi Huzur and presiding over many of its conferences.

In 1966 and 1967, Chowdhury undertook extensive missionary work as part of the Tablighi Jamaat organisation. His travels included Turkey, the United Kingdom, Yugoslavia, Iran, Saudi Arabia and Japan. He became a notable orator, performing lectures in Bengali, Urdu, Arabic and English. Chowdhury was further recognised both as a philanthropist, due to his support of the poor, and as a writer, receiving praise for his publication, Shatter Mapkati (Scale of Truth). He eventually built up an extensive religious following, with his disciples and pupils including Emdadul Haque, Nur Uddin Gohorpuri and Amin Uddin Shaikh-e-Ketia.

== Death and legacy ==
Chowdhury died on 19 February 1990 and was survived by his wife and seven children. His burial in his family's ancestral cemetery at Fulbari was attended by thousands of his followers, with the funeral prayer having been led by Gohorpuri. The Allama Abdul Motin Chowdhury Shaikh-e-Fulbari Foundation was later established in his honour by several former disciples.

== See more ==
- List of Deobandis
