= Fuzail Ahmad Nasiri =

Indian scholar and writer

Mawlānā Fuzail Ahmad Nasiri

Personal life
- Born: 13 May 1978 (age 48) Darbhanga, Bihar, India
- Main interest(s): Urdu literature, Urdu Poetry
- Notable work(s): Hadīth-e-Ambar, Tafhīm-e-Ilhāmi, Tafhīm-ul-Maybzi
- Education: Darul Uloom Deoband
- Pen name: Ambar Nasiri

Religious life
- Religion: Islam

Senior posting
- Influenced by: Kalim Ajiz, Muhammad Iqbal

Fuzail Ahmad Nāsirī (born 13 May 1978) is an Indian Deobandi Islamic scholar, Urdu writer and poet, who is a professor of hadith and vice-administrator of education at the Jamia Imam Muhammad Anwar Shah. He is an alumnus of Darul Uloom Deoband. His books include Hadīth-e-Ambar, Tafhīm-e-Ilhāmi and Tafhīm-ul-Maybzi. He has taught at Darul Uloom Azizia in Mira Road, Jamia Darul Quran in Sarkhej and Madrasa Faizan-ul-Quran in Saraspur. He is a recipient of Allama Iqbal Award.

== Biography ==
Fuzail Ahmad Nāsirī was born on 13 May 1978 Nasir Ganj in Darbhanga, Bihar, India. He completed his primary studies with his father in Madrasa Mehr-ul-Uloom in Madhubani and was schooled at Madrasa Diniya Ghazipur, Uttar Pradesh and Madrasa Islamia in Darbhanga. He graduated from Darul Uloom Deoband in 1998. He benefitted from Kalim Ajiz in Urdu poetry.

Nāsirī began teaching in July 1999 at Darul Uloom Azizia in Mira Road, where he served for four years. In 2004, he moved to Ahmedabad where he served as a teacher of "dars-e-nizami" at the Jamia Darul Quran in Sarkhej and the Madrasa Faizan-ul-Quran in Saraspur for four years. In 2008, he became a teacher at the Jamia Imam Muhammad Anwar Shah. He serves as the vice-administrator of education and teaches hadith at the seminary. He regularly contributed to the Urdu Times as a columnist for two years and his articles have also appeared in Roznama Inqelab. He received the Allama Iqbal Award in All India Quran Competition at Mumbai in March 2019.

== Literary works ==
Literary works of Nāsirī include:

- Hadīth-e-Ambar
- Tafhīm-e-Ilhāmi (Urdu commentary of Muntakhab al-Hussami).
- Tafhīm-ul-Maybzi (Urdu commentary of Maybzi).
- Pachasi Saala Funkaar: Apne Aayine Mai (a critical review of Wahiduddin Khan).

== See also ==
- List of Indian writers
- List of Deobandis

== Bibliography ==
- Hasan Qasmi, Nayab (2013). Darul Uloom Deoband Ka Sahafati ManzarNama (in Urdu). Deoband: Idara Tehqeeq-e-Islami. pp. 311–313.
- Arshad Qasmi, Ejaz (June 2017). "Mawlānā Fuzail Ambar Nasiri". Ulama-e-Deoband Ki Urdu Shayri (in Urdu). Jamia Nagar, New Delhi: Creative Star Publications. pp. 191–201.
