= Nur Uddin Gohorpuri =

Bangladeshi Islamic scholar

- Title: Maulana, Allamah, Shaikh-ul-Hadith

Personal life
- Born: 1924 Gohorpur, Sylhet District, Assam Province
- Died: 26 April 2005 (aged 81)
- Resting place: Gohorpur, Balaganj Upazila, Sylhet District, Bangladesh
- Era: Modern
- Education: Darul Uloom Deoband

Religious life
- Religion: Islam
- Movement: Deobandi
- Profession: Islamic scholar, teacher

Muslim leader
- Predecessor: Habibur Rahman Raipuri
- Successor: Ghiyasuddin Baliya
- Influenced by: Hussain Ahmad Madani Bashir Uddin Shaykh-e-Bagha Abdul Matin Chowdhury Izaz Ali Amrohi

Nur Uddin Ahmed Gohorpuri (Bengali: নূর উদ্দিন আহমদ গহরপুরী; 1924 – 26 April 2005) was a Bengali Muslim religious scholar and teacher. He was notable for his association with Qawmi madrasas in Bangladesh as well as for having been the founder of Gohorpur Hussainia Madrasa.

== Early life ==
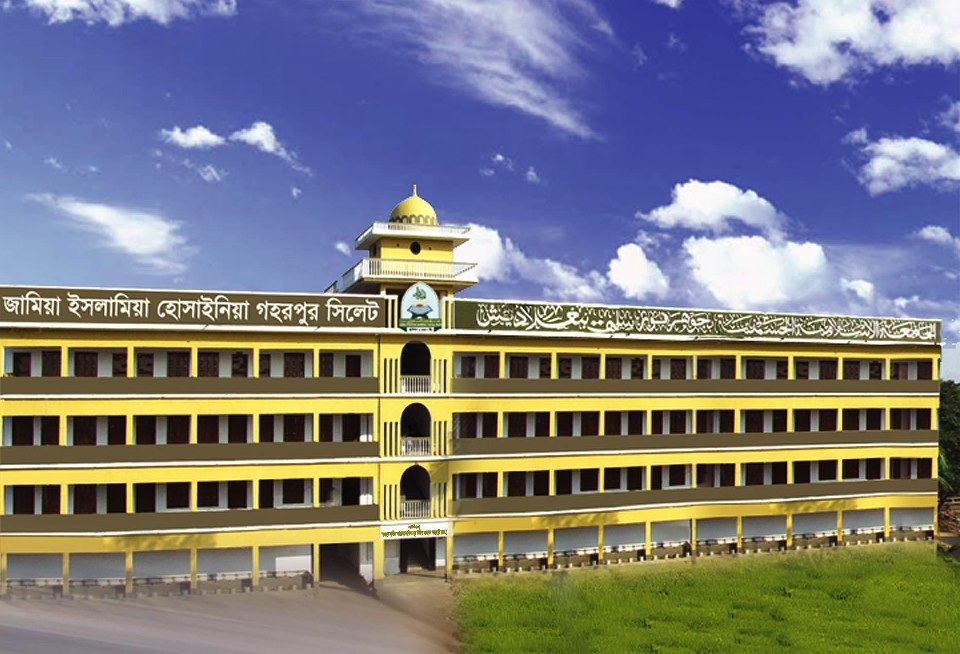
Gohorpur Hussainia Madrasa

Gohorpuri was born in 1924 to a Bengali family in the Mullahpara of Shiorkhal in Gohorpur pargana, located in what is now Sylhet District, Bangladesh. His father was Mawlana Zahur Uddin Ahmad and his mother was Suratunnesa.

== Education ==
He studied at a local maktab in Sultanpur. Following the death of his father, who had been a scholar, Gohorpuri was given at a young age to Bashir Uddin Shaykh-e-Bagha, a religious figure, to be trained as his disciple. He continued his studies in Purbabhag Madrasa in Jalalpur and Bagha Alia Madrasa where he finished his third year. Bashir Uddin helped him enrol in Darul Uloom Deoband, where Gohorpuri was taught hadith by Hussain Ahmad Madani, who had been Bashir Uddin's teacher. Following his graduation in 1950, Gohorpuri became one of Madani's pupils himself.

== Career ==
In 1952, upon Izaz Ali Amrohi and Madani's instructions, he became employed as a hadith scholar at the Pangasia Alia Madrasa in Barisal for two years, before transferring to perform the same role at the Balia Ashraful Uloom Madrasa in Mymensingh. In 1956, he returned to his native village and founded the Gohorpur Hussainia Madrasa, serving there as the hadith scholar and muhtamim (principal) for the remainder of his life. It later became one of the most prominent Islamic educational institutions in Bangladesh.

During the 1960s, Gohorpuri joined the Jamiat Ulema-e-Islam political party. He contested for a seat at the National Assembly during the 1970 Pakistani general election but was unsuccessful. Gohorpuri was elected chairman of Befaqul Madarisil Arabia Bangladesh in 1996 succeeding Harun Islamabadi, becoming associated with more than 50 Qawmi madrasas as well as being the founder and patron of 13.

== Death and legacy ==
Gohorpuri died on 26 April 2005 at the age of 81. He left behind four wives, four daughters and a son, Muslehuddin Raju, the latter of whom succeeded him as head of Gohorpur Hussainia Madrasa. His funeral in front of his home in Gohorpur was attended by several thousand of his pupils.

== See also ==
- List of Deobandis

Political offices
Preceded by Harun Islamabadi	Chairman of Befaqul Madarisil Arabia Bangladesh; 1996-2005	Succeeded by Shah Ahmad Shafi
