= Anwar Shah Kashmiri =

Kashmiri scholar and poet (1875–1933)

Imam al-Asr Mawlānā Anwar Shah Kashmiri
- اَنوَر شاہ کشمیٖری

4th Principal and Sheikh al-Hadith of Darul Uloom Deoband
- In office 1915–1927
- Preceded by: Mahmud Hasan Deobandi
- Succeeded by: Hussain Ahmad Madani

Personal details
- Born: 26 November 1875
- Died: 28 May 1933 (aged 57)
- Relations: Ali ibn Abi Talib
- Children: Azhar Shah Qaiser, Anzar Shah Kashmiri
- Education: Darul Uloom Deoband

Personal life
- Main interests: Hadith studies; Poetry
- Notable works: Fayd al-Bari; Anwar al-Bari; Al-Arf al-Shadhi

Religious life
- Religion: Islam
- Denomination: Sunni
- Jurisprudence: Hanafi
- Creed: Maturidi (with notable Athari inclination)
- Movement: Deobandi

Muslim leader
- Teacher: Mahmud Hasan Deobandi, Ghulam Rasool Hazarvi
- Disciple of: Rashid Ahmad Gangohi
- Students: Saeed Ahmad Akbarabadi, Atiqur Rahman Usmani, Yusuf Banuri, Athar Ali Bengali, Hamid al-Ansari Ghazi, Manazir Ahsan Gilani, Idris Kandhlawi, Muhammad Miyan Deobandi, Muhammad Shafi, Manzoor Nomani, Abdul Qadir Raipuri, Hifzur Rahman Seoharwi, Syed Fakhruddin Ahmad, Muhammad Tayyib Qasmi, Zayn al-Abidin Sajjad Meerthi, Badre Alam Merathi
- Influenced: Muhammad Iqbal Syed Ata Ullah Shah Bukhari

Anwar Shah Kashmiri (Kashmiri: اَنوَر شاہ کشمیٖری; 26 November 1875 – 28 May 1933) was an Islamic scholar from Kashmir in the early twentieth century, best known for his expertise in the study of hadith, a strong memory, and a unique approach to interpreting traditions, as well as the fourth principal of Darul Uloom Deoband. With an ancestral heritage of religious scholarship rooted in Baghdad, he acquired training in Islamic sciences at Darul Uloom Deoband under the mentorship of Mahmud Hasan Deobandi, alongside enjoying a spiritual journey with Rashid Ahmad Gangohi. Initiating his vocation as the first principal of Madrasa Aminia, he embarked on a hajj in 1906 with a sojourn in Medina, dedicated to exploring the depths of hadith literature. Subsequently, he joined Darul Uloom Deoband, serving as the post of Sheikh al-Hadith for nearly thirteen years before choosing Jamia Islamia Talimuddin as his final destination for his academic voyage. Although he displayed limited inclination toward the written word, a handful of treatises flowed from his pen. Yet, the bulk of his literary legacy has been preserved through the efforts of his students, who transcribed his classroom lectures, discourses, and sermons. While the crux of his scholarly work centered on championing the Hanafi school and establishing its supremacy, he also garnered recognition for his comparatively liberal approach to various religious matters. His publications found their place under the patronage of Majlis-i Ilmi, a scholarly institution established in Delhi in 1929. His scholarly credentials received official endorsement with the publication of Fayd al-Bari, a four-volume Arabic commentary on Sahih al-Bukhari, curated by Badre Alam Merathi and published in Cairo, with the financial support of Jamiatul Ulama Transvaal.

The spectrum of his literary endeavors touched diverse subjects, encompassing the Quran, Fundamental Beliefs, Metaphysics, Islamic Jurisprudence, Zoology, Poetry, and Political Thought, mostly in Arabic, with two in Persian. He also left behind 15,000 couplets of poetry. Many Indian scholars frequently referenced his views and opinions in their works, and he was often referred to as a Mobile Library. During his eighteen-year teaching career at the Deoband seminary, he contributed to the training of approximately two thousand hadith scholars. Regarding his engagement in the political arena, he was a vehement opponent of British colonial rule in India and encouraged Muslims not to cooperate with the British as a member of Jamiat Ulema-e-Hind. He is particularly remembered for his 1927 presidential address at the Peshawar annual meeting. In the twilight of his life, he directed his energies towards countering the rising tide of Qadiyanism, and his erudition manifested in the creation of approximately ten works on the subject. His intellectual prowess even inspired other figures like Muhammad Iqbal to undertake an exploration of Islam and Ahmadism. The government of Jammu and Kashmir has declared his house in Kashmir as an old wooden heritage site.

== Early life and education ==
Anwar Shah Kashmiri was born in Kashmir on 27 [Shawwal] 1292 AH (26 November 1875) in a Sayyid family. Aged four, he started reading the Quran under the instruction of his father, Muazzam Ali Shah. In 1889, he relocated to Deoband, where he studied at the Darul Uloom for three years. In 1892, he moved to Darul Uloom Deoband where he studied with Mahmud Hasan Deobandi and others. Then, in 1896 (1314 AH), he went to Rashid Ahmad Gangohi and obtained a teaching certificate in Hadith (which he had been studying for two years) and esoteric knowledge.

== Career ==
After graduating from Darul Uloom, he taught in Madrasa Aminia, Delhi, serving as its first principal. In 1903 he went to Kashmir, where he established Faiz-e A'am Madrasah. In 1905 (1323 AH) he performed Hajj. Four years later, he returned to Deoband. Until 1933, he taught books of Hadith without taking a salary. He held the guardianship of Darul Uloom for nearly twelve years. He resigned in 1927 (1346 AH) and went to the Madrasah of Dabhel in western India, where, until 1932 (1351), he taught Hadith. He left his family in 1887 and moved into the Madrasah in India.

He taught at the Madrasah Fay'm for three years before embarking on his Hajj to Mecca and Medina. He visited his Deoband instructor Mahmood Hasan, who persuaded him to take a position teaching in Deoband. When Mahmood Hasan himself subsequently relocated to Medina in 1908, Shah began teaching Hadith. He retained the position until 1927, when he departed after a disagreement with management.

Kashmiri moved to Jamia Islamia Talimuddin along with Azizur Rahman Usmani in 1927 where he taught Hadith until 1932.

== Death and legacy ==
In 1933, Shah became ill and traveled to Deoband for medical care. He continued addressing students there until he died on 28 May 1933. He was survived by his elder son Azhar Shah Qaiser and younger son Anzar Shah Kashmiri. Muhammad Iqbal arranged a condolence ceremony, at which he described Kashmiri as the greatest Islamic scholar of the last five hundred years.

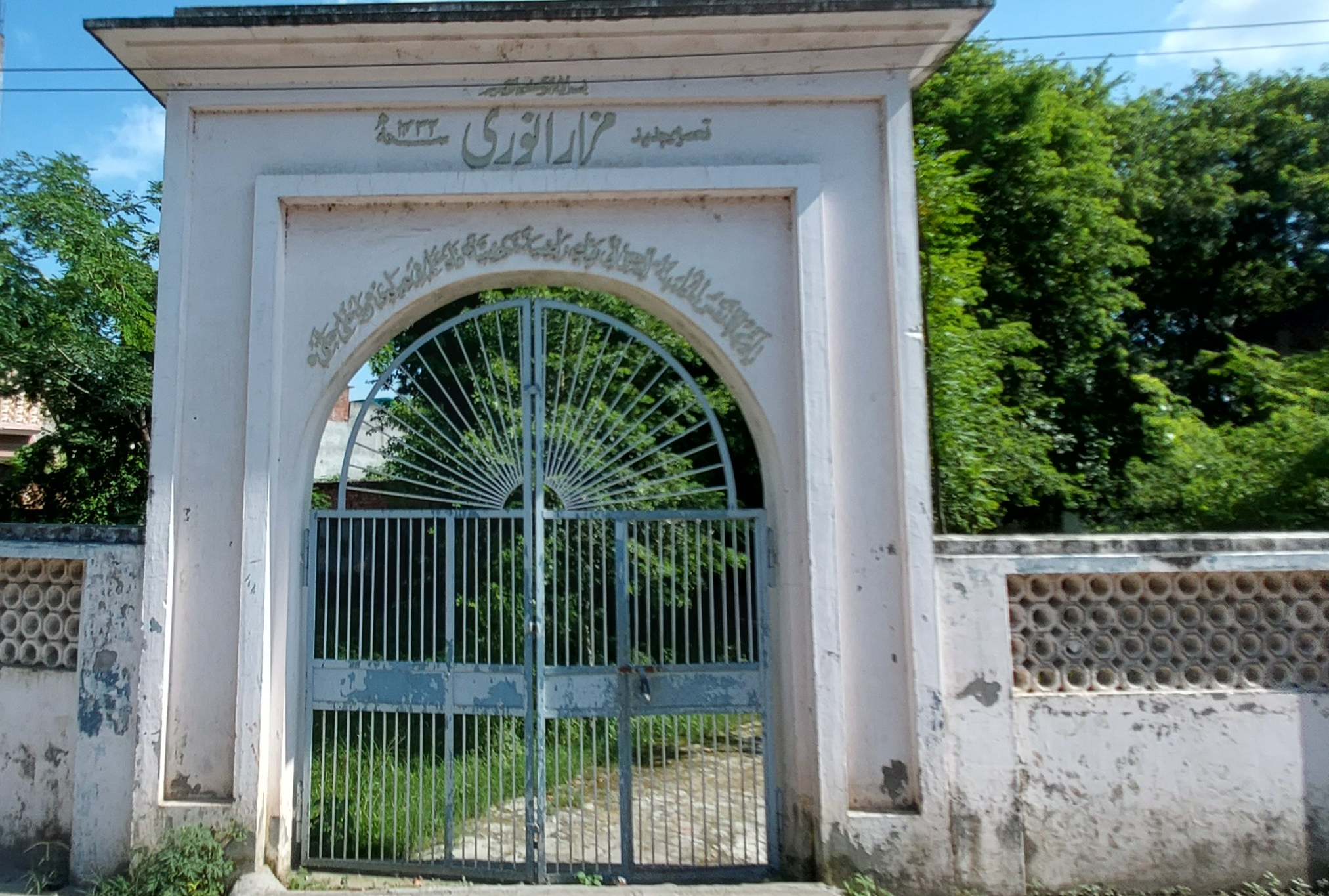
Gateway to Mazar-e-Anwari Cemetery where Shah is buried.

Anwar Shah Kashmiri is regarded by many as one of the most versatile and prolific hadith scholars produced by the subcontinent. In recognition of his contributions in the field of hadith literature and revival of various Islamic sciences, Islamic scholar Sayyid Rashid Rida said, "I have never seen a more distinguished scholar of hadith than Allamah Kashmiri."

Jamia Imam Muhammad Anwar Shah, Deoband is an Islamic school named after Kashmiri. Yunoos Osman wrote his D.Phil thesis Life and Works of Allamah Muhammad Anwar Shah Kashmiri at the University of Durban-Westville.

A book about Kashmiri entitled The Pride of Kashmir was released in December 2015. During the release of the book, Engineer Rashid, then MLA of Langate renamed Student of the year award of Kupwara to "Moulana Anwar Shah Kashmiri Award for Excellence".

== Literary works ==
Kashmiri also wrote poetry and often put his scholarly writings in that form. Some of his articles and manuscripts remain unpublished.

His works include:

- Mushkilat al-Quran
- Fayd al-Bari ‘ala Sahih al-Bukhari— Famous Commentary on Sahih on Imam al-Bukhari.
- Anwar al-Baari (Urdu commentary of Sahih Bukhari, compiled by Kashmiri's son-in-law Ahmad Raza Bijnori)
- Al-Arf al-Shadhi Sharh Sunan al-Tirmidhi—It is an Arabic commentary on al-Tirmidhi's hadith collection Jami al-Tirmidhi, transcribed and assembled from classroom lectures and dictations.
- Al-Ithāf li-Madhab al-Ahnāf—The marginal notes of al-Kashmīrī on al-Nīmwī's (1322) Āthār al-Sunan, It was released in two volumes, by Majlis Da'wat wa Tahqīq-e-Islāmī, Jāmi'ah 'Ulūm al-Islāmiyyah, Banuri Town, Karachi.
- Anwar al-wudood—A newly published collection of Shaykh Anwar al-Kashmiri's transcribed lectures on Sunan Abi Dawud. It is published under the supervision of his grandson, Shaykh Khadhir Shah Mas'udi.
- Tahiyat al-Islām fi Hayāt 'Īsa
- al-Tasrih bi-ma tawatir fi nuzul al-Masih(The Declaration of that which has been Mass-Narrated regarding the Descent of the Messiah)—Compiled and arranged by his student, Mufti Muhammad Shafi under his direct instruction. It was edited with extensive academic verification and footnotes by the prominent Syrian scholar Abd al-Fattah Abu Ghudda.
- Ifkār al-Mulhidīn
- Al-Darb al-Khātim 'alā Hudūth al-'Ālam—A 400-verse poem where he tries to prove the existence of God by establishing temporality of the cosmos (ḥudūth al-ʿālam).
- Mirqat al-Tarim li Huduth al-Alam— Another short arabic treatise on Temporality of the cosmos.
- Kitāb al-Dhab 'an Qurrat al-'Aynayn
- Fasl al-Khitāb fi Umm al-Kitāb
- Khatimat al-Khitab fi Fatihat al-Kitab—A consise treatise which addresses legal and traditional rulings regarding the recitation of Surah Al-Fatihah behind the Imam.
- Nayl al-Firqadayn fi Mas'alah Raf al-Yadayn
- Bast al-Yadayn li-Nayl al-Firqadayn
- Al-Nūr al-Fa'id 'ala Nazm al-Farā'id
- Khātam al-Nabiyyīn— Persian text aiming to establish finality of Prophethood of Prophet Muhammad. Allama choose to dedicate this text to people of his native region, Kashmir.

== Students ==
Kashmiri's students include Manazir Ahsan Gilani, Muhammad Tayyib Qasmi, Hifzur Rahman Seoharwi, Saeed Ahmad Akbarabadi, Zayn al-Abidin Sajjad Meerthi, Muhammad Miyan Deobandi, Manzur Nu'mani, and Muhammad Shafi.

== See also ==
- List of Deobandis
- Bibliography of Anwar Shah Kashmiri
