= Faizul Waheed =

Islamic scholar and jurist (1964–2021)

Mufti Faizul Waheed
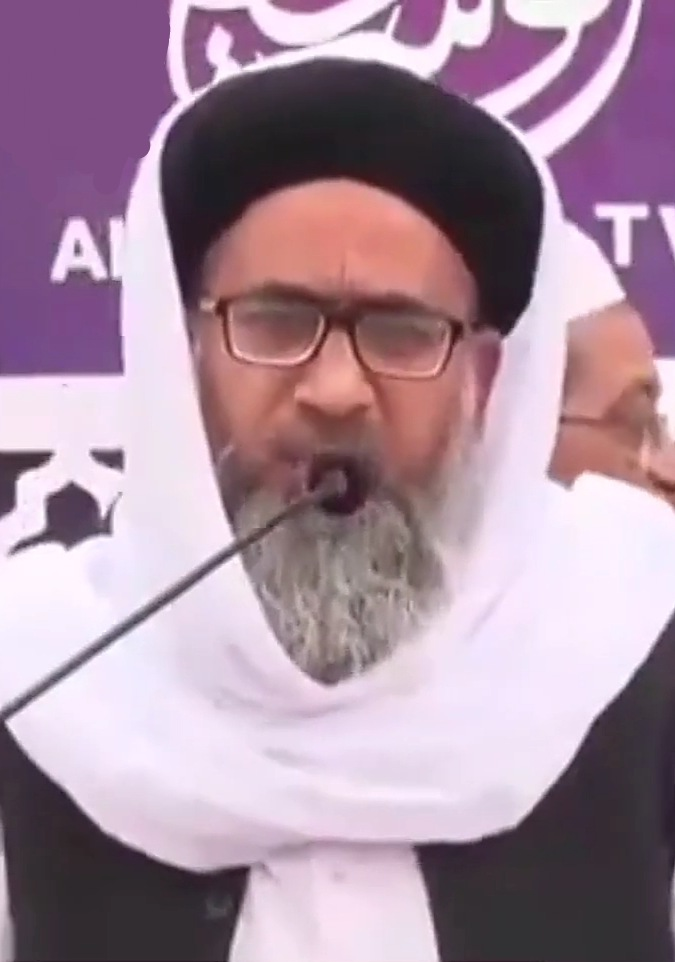
- Faizul Waheed in 2021

Personal life
- Born: 1964 Dodasan Bala, Thanamandi, Rajouri, India
- Died: 1 June 2021 (aged 56) ASCOMS, Jammu
- Main interest: Tafsir
- Notable work: Faiz al-Mannān
- Education: Darul Uloom Deoband; Dr. Bhimrao Ambedkar University

Religious life
- Religion: Islam
- Denomination: Sunni
- Jurisprudence: Hanafi

Faizul Waheed (also known as Faizul Waheed Qāsmī; 1964 – 1 June 2021) was an Indian Islamic scholar, jurist and an exegete of the Quran from Jammu and Kashmir, who served as the chief-mufti of Markaz-ul-Ma'arif, an Islamic seminary in Bathindi, Jammu. He wrote Faiz al-Mannān, the first ever translation and commentary of the Quran in Gojri language.

== Biography ==
Faizul Waheed was born into Muslim Gujjar family in Dodasan Bala, Thanamandi, Rajouri, in 1964. He was schooled at the Madrasa Kāshif-ul-Uloom in Thanamandi and the Madrasa Tālim-ul-Qur'ān in Muzaffarnagar. He studied two years of the dars-e-nizami in Madrasa Khādim-ul-Islam in Hapur and graduated from the Darul Uloom Deoband in 1991. He received an M.A. in Urdu from the Dr. Bhimrao Ambedkar University.

In 1992, Faizul Waheed began teaching at the Madrasa Ashraf-ul-Uloom in Jammu. He alongside Jamāluddīn and Nazīr Aḥmad started Jamia Markaz-ul-Ma'arif, an Islamic seminary in Bathindi, Jammu and moved there on 5 October 1995. As the new institution started, he was subject to some Deobandi–Barelvi conflicts triggered by local followers of the Barelvi movement, which led to his arrest in August 1995. He was imprisoned under the Public Safety Act for eleven months. He continued teaching at the madrasa for next two years and was arrested again in May 1997. He was released in August 2000 and he continued teaching at the Markaz-ul-Ma’arif. He served as the chief-mufti and patron of the Markaz-ul-Ma’arif.

Faizul Waheed was an authority in Islamic jurisprudence and an exegete of the Quran. He translated the Qur'ān into Gojri language and owned the credit of being its first translator in that language. He had penned the translation and the exegesis of the Qur'ān during his imprisonment. In November 2018, he said while speaking at a convention in Gool, Ramban that "the success of every person is concealed in the Qur'ān".

Faizul Waheed was admitted at the Acharaya Shri Chander College of Medical Sciences (ASCOMS) in Jammu on 23 May 2021 to be treated for COVID-19; he died on 1 June 2021 from post COVID-19 complications. Altaf Bukhari, Ghulam Ahmad Mir and Syed Basharat Ahmed Bukhari expressed grief over his death. Chowdhary Zulfkar Ali expressed that the scholar's death was an irreparable loss.

== Literary works ==
Faizul Waheed wrote Faiz al-Mannān, the first ever translation and commentary of the Qur'ān in Gojri language.

His other works include:

- Sirājum Muneera (The Shining Lamp, A biography of Islamic prophet Muhammad.)
- Pāki ke Masā'il Qur'ān-o-Hadees ki Roshni Mein (The Rules of Purity in the Light of Qur'ān and Hadith)
- Mareez-o-Mayyit awr Warāsat ke Ahkām Qur'ān-o-Hadees ki Roshni Mein (Rules of the Ill, the Deceased and Inheritance in the Light of Qur'ān and Hadith)

== See also ==
- List of Deobandis

== Bibliography ==
- Nisar Aḥmad Bhat Trāli; Yūsuf al-Azam (November 2015). "Faizul Waheed". Ā'īna-e-Madāris Jammu wa Kashmīr (in Urdu). Vol. 1. Srinagar: Afaq Printers. pp. 236–237.
