= Muhammad Sufyan Qasmi =

Indian Islamic scholar (born 1954)

Maulana Muhammad Sufyan Qasmi

2nd Rector of Darul Uloom Waqf, Deoband
- Incumbent
- Assumed office 3 September 2014
- Preceded by: Muhammad Salim Qasmi

Personal life
- Born: 26 September 1954 (age 72)
- Parent: Muhammad Salim Qasmi (father)
- Region: India
- Education: Darul Uloom Deoband, Aligarh Muslim University, Al-Azhar University
- Relatives: Qari Muhammad Tayyib (grandfather), Hafiz Muhammad Ahmad (great-grandfather), Muhammad Qasim Nanautawi (great-great-grandfather)

Religious life
- Religion: Islam
- Denomination: Sunni
- Jurisprudence: Hanafi
- Movement: Deobandi

Muhammad Sufyan Qasmi Siddiqi (born 26 September 1954) is an Indian Sunni Muslim scholar and current rector of Darul Uloom Waqf, Deoband.

== Biography ==
Muhammad Sufyan Qasmi was born on 26 September 1954 into the Siddiqi family of Nanauta. His father Muhammad Salim Qasmi was former rector of Darul Uloom Waqf, Deoband, whilst his grandfather Muhammad Tayyib Qasmi remained vice-chancellor of the Darul Uloom Deoband for about half century.

Qasmi graduated in traditional dars-e-nizami from the Darul Uloom Deoband in 1975. He studied intermediate classes in private from Aligarh Muslim University (AMU). He got a BA and an MA degree from the AMU in private and acquired an MA in Islamic theology from the Al-Azhar University.

Qasmi began teaching at the Darul Uloom Waqf in 1983. He has taught the books of Hadith such as Sahih Bukhari and Tirmidhi along with other primary books of dars-e-nizami. He served the seminary as the deputy rector for 12 years, and was appointed the rector on 3 September 2014. He is also a member of the executive council of All India Muslim Personal Law Board since 2007.

== Views on knowledge ==
Qasmi maintains the view that knowledge is a unit and it is wrong to divide it as Islamic and Non-Islamic. He argues that in Islam, knowledge can be grouped as profitable (نافع) and non-profitable (غیر نافع).

== See also ==
- List of Darul Uloom Deoband alumni
