= Jamia Sharyeah Malibagh =

Coordinates: 23.7504°N 90.4148°E

Al-Jamia Al-Shari'yah Malibagh
- Malibagh Jamia, Malibagh Madrasa
- Type: Qawmi Madrasa, Arabic Islamic University
- Established: 1956
- Students: 850
- Location: 1037, Malibagh Chowdhury Para Malibagh, Dhaka, Bangladesh
- Campus: Urban
- Website: jamiamalibag.com

Jamia Shariyah Malibagh (Bengali: জামিয়া শারইয়্যাহ মালিবাগ Arabic: الجامعة الشرعية ماليباغ), also known as Jamia Shariyah Madrasa, is one of the established Qawmi jamiahs in Dhaka, Bangladesh.

== History ==
A musalli Golam Gouse donated his land to set up this mosque in 1956. Later they established a small maktab named Furkqania Maktab. Day by day this maktab improved as Tahfizul Qur'an and later as Kitab faculty. In 1982 this institution started Daura Hadith (the highest certificate course of Madrasa education system), through the help of local people and the labor of scholars and teachers.

Jamia Shariyah Malibagh is a longstanding madrasa in Bangladesh.

== Departments and divisions ==
- Department of Ifta (Islamic Law)
- Masters/Daura Hadith
- Degree
- Higher secondary
- Secondary level
- Primary Level
- Tahfizul Quran
- Maktab
  - Outdoor Maktab
  - Residential Maktab

== Notable people ==
- Qazi Mu'tasim Billah (1933–2013), longtime principal
- Ishaq Faridi
