= Darul Uloom Waqf Deoband =

Indian Islamic University (e. 1982)

Coordinates: 29°41′56.77″N 77°40′8.99″E

Al-Jamia Al-Islamia Darul Uloom Waqf Deoband
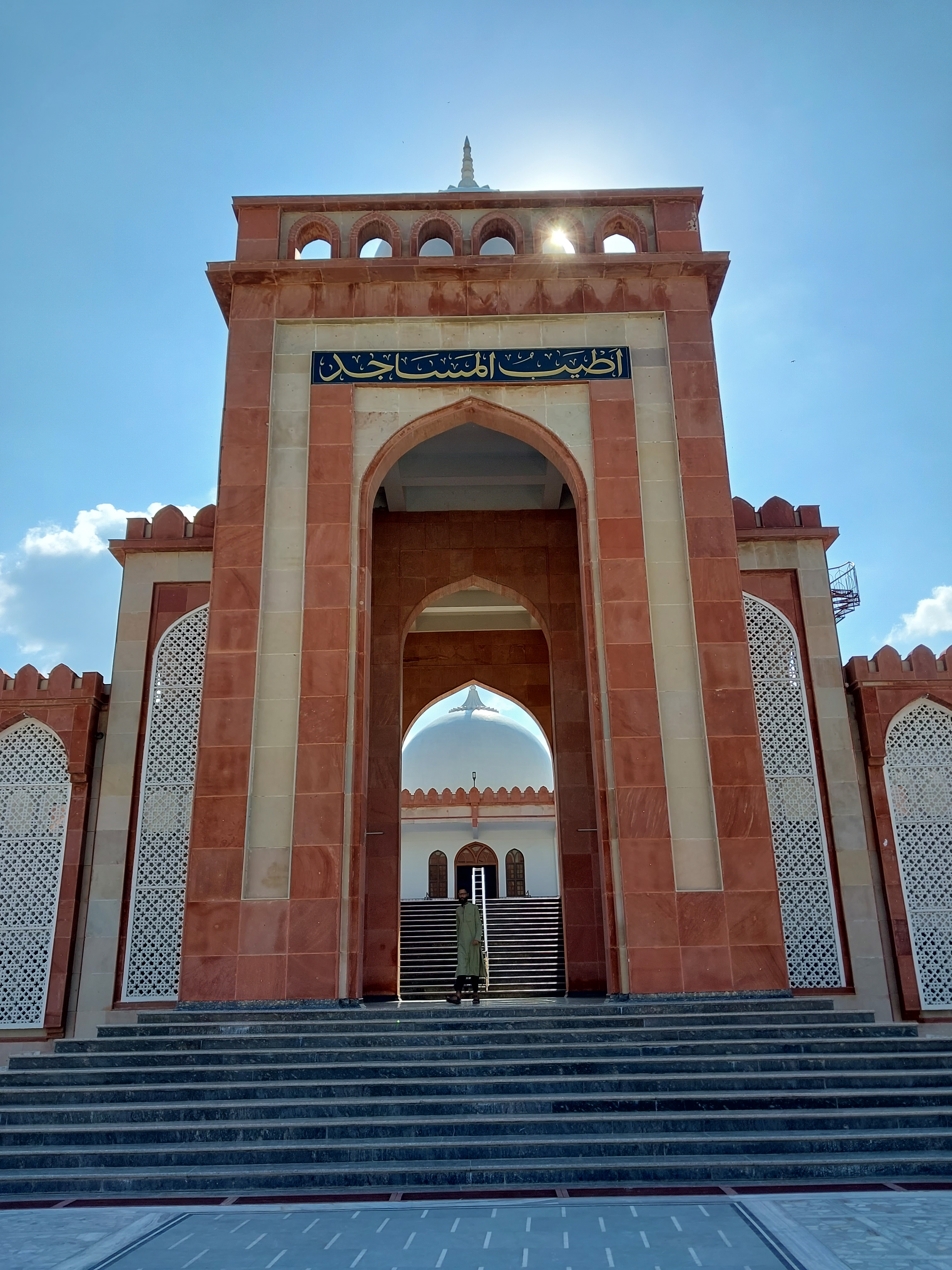
- Type: Madrasa
- Established: 1982 (44 years ago)
- Founders: Muhammad Salim Qasmi; Anzar Shah Kashmiri
- Rector: Muhammad Sufyan Qasmi
- Location: Deoband, Saharanpur, Uttar Pradesh, India
- Website: www.dud.edu.in

Al-Jamia Al-Islamia Darul Uloom Waqf Deoband (known as Darul Uloom Waqf) is a madrasa situated in the Indian town of Deoband. It was established by scholars led by Muhammad Salim Qasmi and Anzar Shah Kashmiri in 1982 as a result of administration disputes in Darul Uloom Deoband during 1980–1982. As of 2021, Muhammad Sufyan Qasmi is its rector.

== History ==
During 1980 and 1982, Darul Uloom Deoband experienced administrative disputes. These disputes led to its bifurcation. Darul Uloom Deoband remained under the control of Madanis, led by Asad Madni, while the other faction which was led by Muhammad Salim Qasmi and Anzar Shah Kashmiri established a new madrassa called Darul Uloom Waqf in 1982. Muhammad Salim Qasmi was its first rector. On 3 September 2014, the advisory board of Darul Uloom Waqf appointed Muhammad Sufyan Qasmi as its rector.

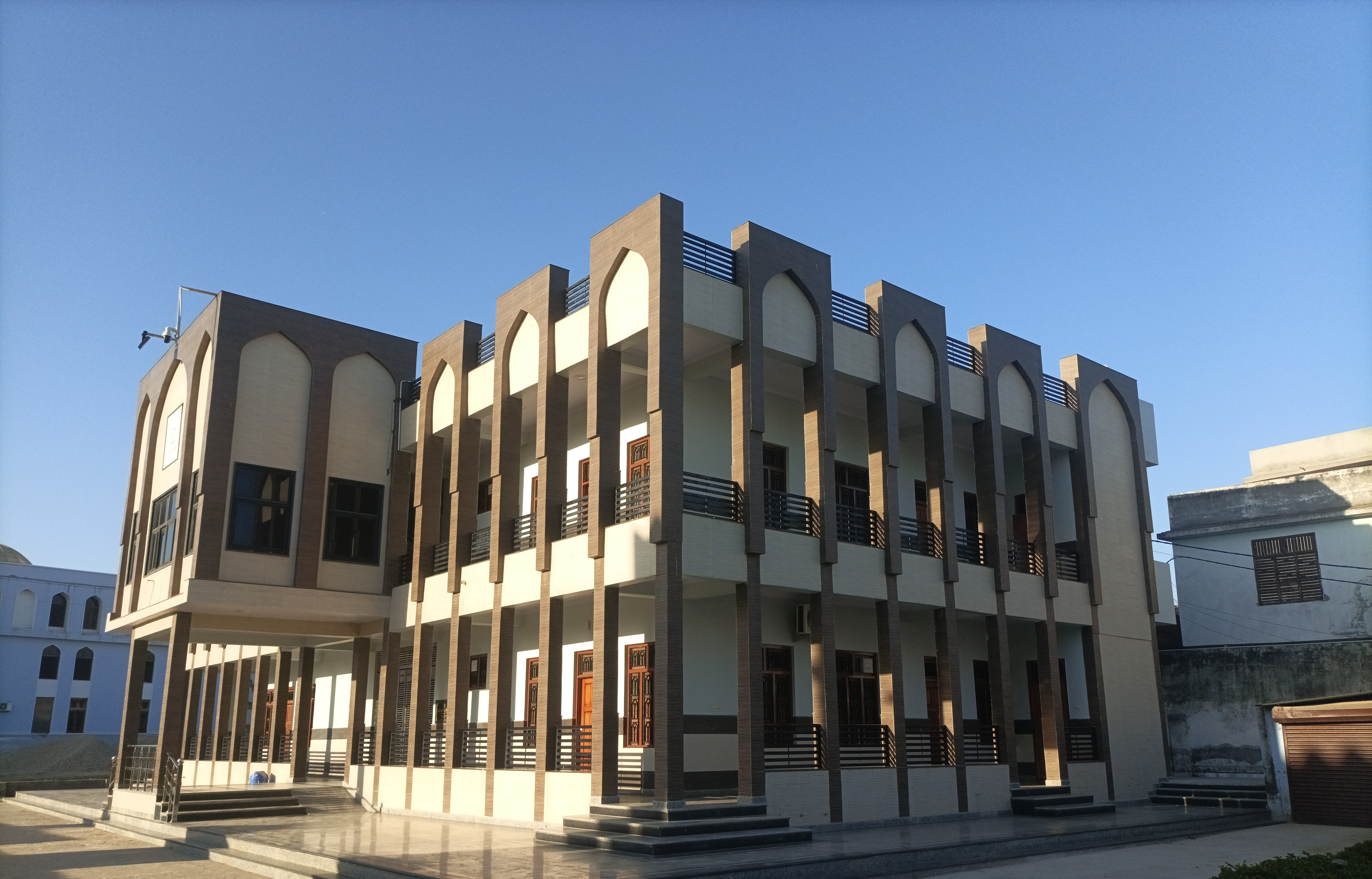
Hujjatul Islam Academy

The seminary publishes, Nida'e Darul Uloom Waqf, a monthly magazine in Urdu and Wahdat al-Ummah, a bi-annual Arabic journal. It has publishes a quarterly magazine in English, called, Voice of Darul Uloom. It has a research department called Hujjatul Islam Academy. The academy was established in order to answer modern challenges and simplify the ideology and discourses of Qasim Nanawtawi. Hayyat-i-Tayyib, the biography of Muhammad Tayyib Qasmi was among its early publications, which was authored by Ghulam Nabi Kashmiri.

== Magazines ==
The institution publishes three magazines: the monthly Nida-e-Darul Uloom Waqf in Urdu, the bi-annual Wahdat-ul-Ummah (ISSN 2348-5051) in Arabic, and the quarterly Voice of Darul Uloom in English. These publications are edited by Shakaib Qasmi and are issued under the supervision of the institution's rector.

== Alumni ==
- Ghulam Nabi Kashmiri
- Hasheem Ahmad Siddiqui

== See also ==
- List of Deobandi madrasas
