= Muhammad Tayyib Qasmi =

Indian Sunni Islamic Scholar

Qari Muhammad Tayyib قاری محمد طیب

10th Vice-Chancellor of Darul Uloom Deoband
- In office 1929 – 9 August 1982
- Preceded by: Habibur Rahman Usmani
- Succeeded by: Marghoobur Rahman Bijnori

Personal details
- Born: Muzaffaruddin/Khurshid Qasim; May 1897 Deoband, British India
- Died: 17 July 1983 (aged 86) Deoband, India
- Resting place: Deoband, India
- Children: Muhammad Salim Qasmi (son)
- Parent: Hafiz Muhammad Ahmad (father)
- Relatives: Muhammad Qasim Nanautavi (grandfather), Muhammad Sufyan Qasmi (grandson), Abidullah Ghazi (grandson)
- Education: Darul Uloom Deoband

Personal life
- Notable work(s): Human Being: A Distinguished Creature, The Maslak of Ulama of Deoband, Mas'ala Zuban-e-Urdu Hindustan Mein

Religious life
- Religion: Islam
- Denomination: Sunni
- Founder of: All India Muslim Personal Law Board
- Jurisprudence: Hanafi
- Creed: Maturidi
- Movement: Deobandi

Muslim leader
- Disciple of: Ashraf Ali Thanwi
- Students: Tafazzul Haque Habiganji Qazi Mu'tasim Billah Naseer Ahmad Khan

Muhammad Tayyib Qasmi (known as Qari Muhammad Tayyib) was an Indian Sunni Islamic scholar who served as Vice Chancellor of Darul Uloom Deoband for more than half a century. He was grandson of Muhammad Qasim Nanautavi, the founder of the Darul Uloom Deoband.

== Biography ==
Muhammad Tayyib Qasmi was born in 1892 or 1897 into the Siddiqi family of Nanauta. (Note: Shakaib Qasmi and Ghulam Nabi Qasmi state the birth year to be 1892 and Syed Mehboob Rizwi and Noor Alam Khalil Amini maintain the point that Qari Tayyab was born in 1897. However, both mention 1315 AH as his birth year.) He served as Deputy Vice Chancellor of Darul Uloom Deoband from 1344 AH to 1347 AH (1924 to 1928 AD). (Note: In 1341 AH, he was appointed as Deputy Vice Chancellor, but he resigned so that he could engage in academic and educational pursuits with equality; however, he had to assume this position again.) He succeeded Habibur Rahman Usmani as Vice Chancellor of Darul Uloom in mid-1348 AH (1929 AH) and resigned on August 9, 1982 AD (Dhu al-Qadah 18, 1402 AH), after disagreements and disturbances erupted in Darul Uloom Deoband in 1980 (1400 AH). He also founded the All India Muslim Personal Law Board and headed it until his death.

His poetical compositions have been published as Irfan-e-Arif.

He died in Deoband on 17 July 1983. His funeral prayer was led by his eldest son Muhammad Salim Qasmi.

== Literary works ==
Muhammad Tayyib’s books include:

- Al-Tashabbuh fil-Islam
- Mashaheer-e-Ummat
- Kalimat-e-Tayyibat
- Atyab al-Thamar fi Mas'alat al-Qaza wal-Qadr
- Science aur Islam
- Talimat-e-Islam aur Maseehi Aqwaam
- Mas'alah Zuban-e-Urdu Hindustan Mein
- Din-o-Siyasat
- Asbab Urooj-o-Zawaley Aqwaam
- Islami Azadi Ka Mukammal Program
- Al-Ijtehad wal Taqleed
- Usool Dawat-e-Islam
- Islami Masawat
- Fitri Hukumat

Translations of his books

- Human Being: A Distinguished Creature
- The Maslak of Ulama of Deoband
- Islam and Sectarianism

== See also ==
- List of Darul Uloom Deoband alumni

== Sources ==
- Islami Bishwakosh, Volume 12, p. 287
- Moosa, E. (1 November 2010). "History and Normativity in Traditional Indian Muslim Thought: Reading Shari'a in the Hermeneutics of Qari Muhammad Tayyab (d. 1983)". Rethinking Islamic Studies: 281–301.
- Shah, Syed Ihsan Ullah; Ullah, Atta (2021). "Hakim ul Islam Qari Tayyab Qasmi style of acting in biography". Malakand University Research Journal of Islamic Studies (in Urdu). 3 (2): 51–63. ISSN 2708-6577.
- Sanaullah, Syed; Shah, Syed Hayder (2018). "Qari Muhammad Tayyab as seerah Writer". Rahat-ul-Quloob (in Urdu). 2 (2): 216–228. doi:10.51411/rahat.2.2.2018.43. ISSN 2521-2869. S2CID 239101350.
- aldebal
