= Anzar Shah Kashmiri =

Indian Islamic scholar

Fakhr al-Muhaddithīn Anzar Shah Kashmiri

Personal life
- Born: 6 December 1927 Deoband, Saharanpur, British India
- Died: 26 April 2008 (aged 80) Sir Ganga Ram Hospital, Delhi, India
- Resting place: Mazar-e-Anwari, Deoband
- Parent: Anwar Shah Kashmiri (father)
- Region: India
- Main interest(s): Fiqh, Hadith
- Education: Darul Uloom Deoband
- Occupation: Islamic scholar
- Relatives: Azhar Shah Qaiser (brother)

Religious life
- Religion: Islam
- Denomination: Sunni
- Founder of: Darul Uloom Waqf; Jamia Imam Anwar Shah, Deoband
- Jurisprudence: Hanafi
- Creed: Maturidi
- Movement: Deobandi

Muslim leader
- Influenced by: Hussain Ahmad Madani, Izaz Ali Amrohi
- Influenced: Ghulam Nabi Kashmiri
- Awards: 2003 Presidential Award

Anzar Shah Kashmiri (1927–2008) was an Indian Islamic scholar who established the Jamia Imam Anwar Shah and co-founded the Darul Uloom Waqf in Deoband. He was an alumnus of the Darul Uloom Deoband. He was youngest son of Hanafi scholar Anwar Shah Kashmiri.

== Biography ==
Anzar Shah Kashmiri was born at Deoband on 6 December 1927. His father Anwar Shah Kashmiri was a scholar of ahadith. He graduated from the Darul Uloom Deoband where he studied with Izaz Ali Amrohi and Hussain Ahmad Madani.

In 1982, Shah co-founded the Darul Uloom Waqf, Deoband. He established the Jamia Imam Anwar Shah in 1997. He was appointed the vice president of the Uttar Pradesh Congress Committee in 2004. He received the Presidential Certificate of Honor in 2003 for his contributions to the Arabic language and literature.

== Death and legacy ==
Kashmiri suffered from heart and kidney problems for some years and was being treated at Sir Ganga Ram Hospital in Delhi. He died on Saturday 26 April 2008 in Delhi.

He was buried in Deoband next to the grave of his father Anwar Shah Kashmiri and was survived by wife, six daughters and a son Ahmad Khizar Shah Kashmiri, the chancellor of Jamia Imam Anwar Shah, Deoband.

== Literary works ==
Anzar Shah Kashmiri's books include:

- Taqreer-e-Shahi (Tafsir)
- Al-fayz ul Jaari (Arabic)
- Asma-e-Husna Ki Barkaat
- Nawaderat Imam Kashmiri
- Tadhkira-tul-Izaz (biography of Izaz Ali Amrohi).
- Laal-o-Gul
- Naqsh-e-Dawam
- Khayr al-Majalis

== See also ==
- List of Deobandis
