= Muhammad Salim Qasmi =

Indian Muslim scholar and academic (1926–2018)

Khatīb al-Islām, Mawlānā Muhammad Salim Qasmi
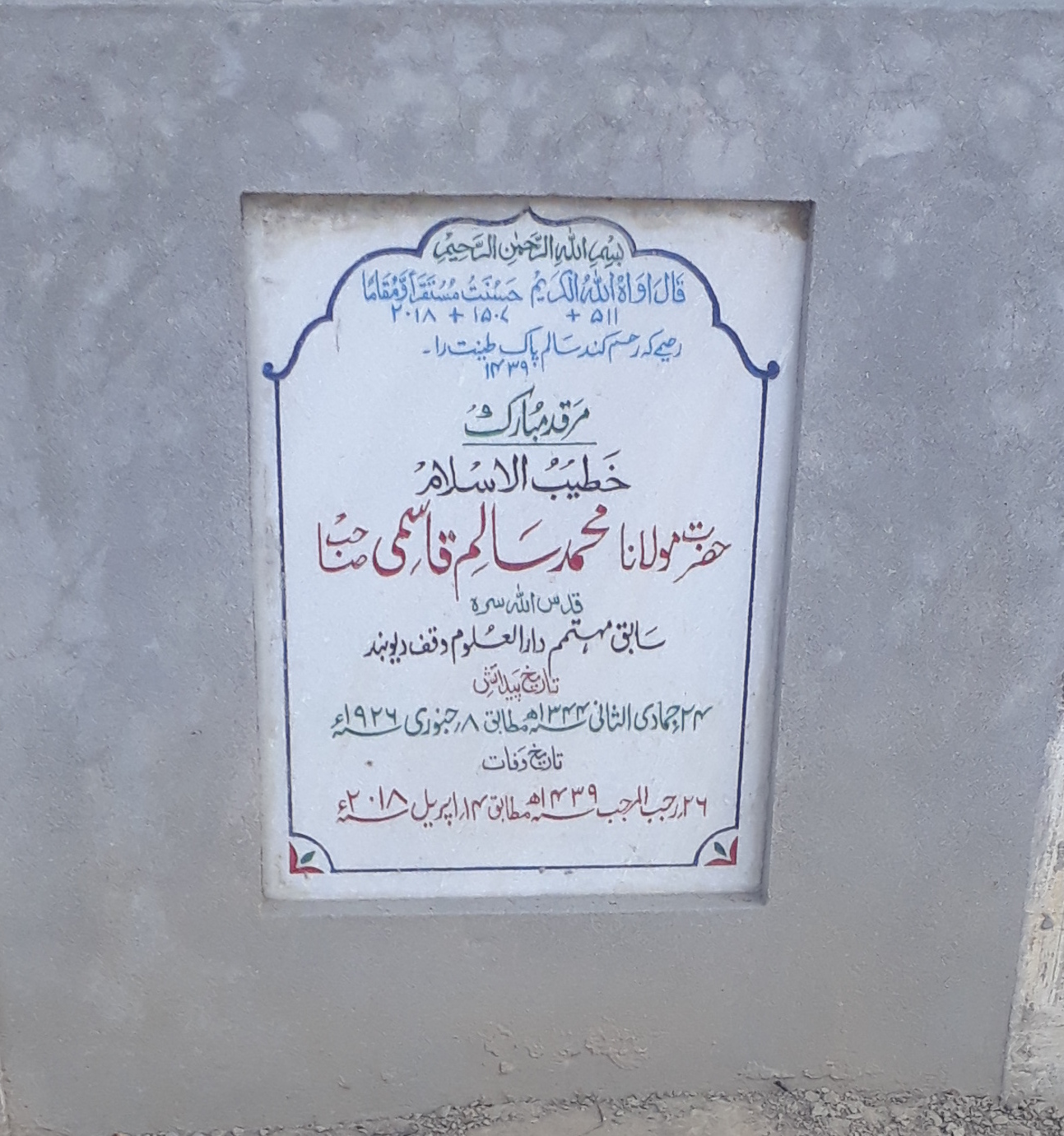
- Gravestone

Chief-Rector of Darul Uloom Waqf
- In office 25 March 1982 – 3 September 2014
- Succeeded by: Muhammad Sufyan Qasmi

Personal life
- Born: 8 January 1926 Deoband, United Provinces, British Raj
- Died: 14 April 2018 (aged 92) Deoband, Uttar Pradesh, India
- Resting place: Mazar-e-Qasmi, Deoband
- Parent: Muhammad Tayyib Qasmi (father)
- Region: India
- Main interest(s): Ilm al-Kalam, Islamic Philosophy
- Notable work: Mabaadi al Tarbiyat al Islami (Arabic)
- Education: Darul Uloom Deoband

Religious life
- Religion: Islam
- Denomination: Sunni
- Founder of: Darul Uloom Waqf
- Jurisprudence: Hanafi
- Creed: Maturidi
- Movement: Deobandi

Muhammad Salim Qasmi Siddiqi (8 January 1926 — 14 April 2018) was an Indian Muslim scholar who co-founded the Darul Uloom Waqf in Deoband, India and served as its first rector. He was an alumnus of Darul Uloom Deoband. He received the fourth Shah Waliullah Award and was honoured with the Mark of Distinction from the Al-Azhar University in Cairo, Egypt.

== Birth and education ==
Muhammad Salim Qasmi was born on 8 January 1926 at Deoband, India into the Siddiqi family of Nanauta. He was the eldest son of Muhammad Tayyib Qasmi. He graduated from Darul Uloom Deoband in 1948 where his teachers included Hussain Ahmad Madani, Izaz Ali Amrohi, Ibrahim Balyawi and Fakhrul Hasan Moradabadi. He studied Mizan, a book of Arabic grammar with Ashraf Ali Thanwi.

== Career ==
Qasmi was appointed as a teacher at Darul Uloom Deoband in 1949. In 1982, alongside Anzar Shah Kashmiri, he co-founded Darul Uloom Waqf and was appointed its chief rector.

Qasmi served as the vice-president of the All India Muslim Personal Law Board and as the president of All India Muslim Majlis-e-Mushawarat. He was a member of the Aligarh Muslim University's Court, member of Darul Uloom Nadwatul Ulama's advisory board and Managing Committee, and member of the Mazahir Uloom's advisory board. He was a permanent member of the Fiqh Council of the Al-Azhar University. He patronised several institutions including Kul Hind Rabta Masajid and Islamic Fiqh Academy, India.

== Literary works ==
He began his writing journey with Da'watul Haq. His works include:

- Mabaadi al Tarbiyat al Islami (Arabic)
- Jaizah Tarjama Quran Karim
- Taajdar e Arze Haram ka Paigham
- Mardaan-e-Ghaazi
- Ek Azeem Tarikhi Khidmat
- Safar Nama Burma
- Khutbat e Khatibul Islam (collection of his speeches) has been published in 5 volumes.

== Awards and recognition ==
Qasmi received the Nishan-e-Imtiyaz (Mark of Distinction) from the Government of Egypt for being a distinguished scholar of the Indian subcontinent. He was conferred with the fourth Shah Waliullah Award and the Imam Muhammad Qasim Nanautawi Award in 2014.

== Death and legacy ==
Muhammad Salim Qasmi died on Saturday 14 April 2018 in Deoband, aged 92. Hujjatul Islam Academy held a 3 days international seminar in August 2018 on The Life and Achievements of Qasmi. His son Muhammad Sufyan Qasmi has been the rector of Darul Uloom Waqf, Deoband since 3 September 2014. Jamiatul Qasim Darul Uloom Al-Islamiah organized a one-day seminar in collaboration with the Islamic Studies department of Jamia Millia Islamia on Qasmi's life and works. The seminar was held in the Ansari Auditorium of the Jamia Millia Islamia and was attended by Akhtarul Wasey.
