= Badrul Hasan Qasmi =

Kuwait-based Indian Islamic scholar (born 1955)

Mawlana, Dr. Badrul Hasan Qasmi

Vice-president of Islamic Fiqh Academy (India)
- In office 2002–present

Editor of Al-Daie
- In office 1976–1982
- Preceded by: Wahiduzzaman Kairanawi
- Succeeded by: Noor Alam Khalil Amini

Personal life
- Born: Badrul Hasan; 8 March 1955 (age 71) Reorha, Darbhanga district, Bihar, India
- Notable work(s): Tawfiyah al-Kayl, Hadith al-Ruh, Qadaya Fiqhiyyah Mu‘asirah, Al-Adab al-Islami al-Muasir
- Education: Jamia Rahmania, Munger; Darul Uloom Deoband; Jamia Millia Islamia (PhD)
- Known for: Vice-president, Islamic Fiqh Academy (India); Editor of Al-Daie (1976–1982); Translation and research work with Kuwait Ministry of Awqaf and Islamic Affairs
- Occupation: Islamic scholar, jurist, writer, editor

Religious life
- Religion: Islam
- Denomination: Sunni
- Creed: Deobandi

Badrul Hasan Qasmi (Arabic: بدر الحسن القاسمي; born 8 March 1955) is an Indian Islamic scholar, jurist, and writer noted for his contributions to Arabic and Urdu scholarship. He began his career at Darul Uloom Deoband, where he taught Islamic sciences and edited the Arabic fortnightly Al-Daie (1976–1982). He later joined the Kuwait Ministry of Awqaf and Islamic Affairs as a researcher and chaired the review committee for the Urdu edition of the Encyclopedia of Islamic Jurisprudence. A founding member and later vice-president of the Islamic Fiqh Academy (India), he has represented it at various international conferences. His works in Arabic and Urdu address Islamic jurisprudence, maqāṣid al-sharīʿah (objectives of Islamic law), Qurʾānic exegesis, and modern intellectual issues.

== Early life and education ==
Badrul Hasan Qasmi was born on 8 March 1955 in the village of Reorha in Darbhanga district, Bihar. He received his primary religious instruction at the local maktab and later continued elementary Arabic and Islamic studies at Jamia Rahmania, Munger.

He subsequently enrolled at Darul Uloom Deoband, completing the fazīlah (traditional advanced course) in 1972 and a specialization in fiqh and iftāʾ (jurisprudence and issuing legal opinions) in 1973. He later earned a doctorate in Islamic studies from Jamia Millia Islamia, Delhi; his doctoral research examined maqāṣid al-sharīʿah (objectives of Islamic law).

== Career ==
=== Early teaching ===
Qasmi began his academic career at Darul Uloom Deoband in 1397 AH / 1976 CE, where he taught fiqh (Islamic jurisprudence), tafsīr (Qurʾānic exegesis), and Arabic language and literature.

=== Al-Daie magazine ===
In the same year, Darul Uloom launched its Arabic fortnightly magazine Al-Daie. Initially edited by Wahiduzzaman Kairanawi, its editorial responsibilities were soon handed to Qasmi owing to Kairanawi’s increasing institutional duties. He served as editor from 1976 to 1982 (1397–1402 AH), during which Al-Daie became a major Arabic-language platform representing Deoband’s academic and reformist thought.

=== Move to Kuwait ===
After leaving Darul Uloom in 1982, Qasmi moved to Kuwait and joined the Kuwait Ministry of Awqaf and Islamic Affairs, where he worked as a researcher in Islamic jurisprudence and served as Chairman of the Review Committee for the Urdu edition of the Encyclopedia of Islamic Jurisprudence. Between 1984 and 1990, he produced programmes for Kuwaiti Radio and served as imam and khatib at the Anas bin Malik Mosque. He also contributed to translation and editorial projects linked to the Encyclopedia of Islam and the Muslim World.

=== Collaborative projects ===
In October 2009, he attended the release ceremony of the Urdu translation of Al-Mawsu‘ah al-Fiqhiyyah (Encyclopaedia of Islamic Jurisprudence) in New Delhi, jointly organised by the Islamic Fiqh Academy (India) and the Kuwait Ministry of Awqaf and Islamic Affairs. While working with the Ministry’s research and fatwa committees, he occasionally translated Urdu legal documents for Arabic fatwas. One such example appears in al-Durar al-Bahiyyah min al-Fatawa al-Kuwaytiyyah (vol. 8, pp. 220–222).

=== Institutional roles ===
He remained connected with Indian Islamic institutions and was appointed vice-president of the Islamic Fiqh Academy (India) in 2002. In 2006, Qasmi was appointed a member of the Constituent Council of the Muslim World League.

=== International participation ===
In 2008, he represented the Academy at the Doha Conference on Muslim Minorities, organised by the International Union of Muslim Scholars and reported by Al Jazeera Arabic. In 2009, he attended the Riyadh meeting of heads and secretaries of international fiqh councils, highlighting King Abdullah bin Abdulaziz’s reform initiatives and their contribution to Muslim unity. He currently serves as president of Al-Mahad al-Aali fil Qaza wal Ifta in Patna, India.

=== Recent activities ===
Qasmi has presented research papers, delivered lectures, and participated in academic and radio programmes in both India and Kuwait. In May 2025, he participated in the 26th session of the International Islamic Fiqh Academy (OIC) held in Doha, presenting an Arabic research paper on "Artificial Intelligence – Its Nature, Scope, Shariah Rulings, and Ethical Regulations".

=== Current position ===
According to the Islamic Bibliography Info Repository at Hamad Bin Khalifa University (Qatar), Qasmi continues to serve with the Kuwait Ministry of Awqaf and Islamic Affairs as a senior researcher in Islamic jurisprudence. The database lists him as Chairman of the Translation Committee for the Fiqh Encyclopedia and credits him with several works on contemporary fiqh, maqāṣid al-sharīʿah, and Qurʾānic studies.

=== Media recognition ===
He has been cited by international media as a recognised Islamic scholar and commentator on contemporary issues, including by Voice of America (Urdu) in 2021.

== Views and opinions ==
In a 2014 visit to India, Qasmi addressed gatherings at Darul Uloom Waqf Deoband and Jamia Imam Muhammad Anwar Shah in Saharanpur. In his speech, he referred to Islamic seminaries as "the strong fortresses of Islam" and emphasized that madrasa graduates should uphold peace and present the true image of Islam through their learning and conduct.

At a seminar of the Islamic Fiqh Academy (India), he emphasized the need to link Islamic legal rulings (fatwas) with the higher objectives of Shariah (maqāṣid al-sharīʿah) to ensure coherence and relevance. In his keynote paper, International Issues and the Objectives of Shariah, he highlighted that the five universal objectives—protection of faith, life, intellect, property, and honour—form the foundation of justice, rights, and peaceful coexistence in Islam.

In a 2022 interview with ETV Bharat, Qasmi emphasized that not every scholar is authorized to issue legal opinions (fatwas) in Islam. He clarified that the media often misrepresents scholars’ personal opinions or institutional statements as fatwas, which, he said, is incorrect. He stressed that only those who have undergone formal training in Islamic jurisprudence are qualified to issue fatwas, and that misuse of this term by unqualified individuals leads to public confusion and harm.

== Literary works ==
Qasmi has authored and edited a number of works in Arabic and Urdu, including critical editions, collections of essays, and studies on contemporary jurisprudence and Islamic thought. His notable works include:

- Qadaya Fiqhiyyah Mu‘asirah (Arabic: قضايا فقهية معاصرة; transl. Contemporary Fiqh Issues)
- Qadiyat Filastin wa Ab‘aduha al-Siyasiyyah wa al-Jughrafiyyah (Arabic: قضية فلسطين وأبعادها السياسية والجغرافية; transl. The Palestine Issue and Its Political and Geographical Dimensions)
- Hadith al-Ruh (Arabic: حديث الروح; transl. Talks of the Soul)
- Al-Adab al-Islami al-Muasir (Arabic: الأدب الإسلامي المعاصر; transl. Contemporary Islamic Literature)
- Fatawa Shar‘iyyah (Arabic: فتاوى شرعية; transl. Legal Opinions)
- Ehteram al-Tanaw‘ al-Hadari fi ‘Asr al-‘Awlamah (Arabic: احترام التنوع الحضاري في عصر العولمة; transl. Respect for Cultural Diversity in the Age of Globalization)
- Hudud al-Ta‘amul ma‘a Ghayr al-Muslimin (Arabic: حدود التعامل مع غير المسلمين; transl. Limits of Interaction with Non-Muslims)
- Al-Darurah (Arabic: الضرورة; transl. Necessity)
- Al-‘Urf (Arabic: العرف; transl. Customary Law)
- Al-Ijazah al-Mawsufah fi al-Dhimmah (Arabic: الإجازة الموصوفة في الذمة; transl. Deferred Guarantee)
- Maqasid al-Shari‘ah al-Islamiyyah (Arabic: مقاصد الشريعة الإسلامية; transl. Objectives of Islamic Law)
- Anmat al-‘Inayah bil-Qur’an al-Karim (Arabic: أنماط العناية بالقرآن الكريم; transl. Patterns of Qur’anic Care)
- Kuwait, Irāqi Jārihiyyat se Pehle aur Uske baad (Urdu: کویت عراقی جارحیت سے پہلے اور اس کے بعد; transl. Kuwait before and after the Iraqi invasion)
- ‘Asr-e-Hazir ke Fiqhi Masāil (Urdu: عصر حاضر کے فقہی مسائل; transl. Contemporary Islamic jurisprudential issues)
- Islam aur ‘Asr-e-Hazir (Urdu: اسلام اور عصر حاضر; transl. Islam and the Contemporary Age)
- Tawfiyah al-Kayl li-Man Harrama Luhūm al-Khayl (Arabic: توفية الكيل لمن حرم لحوم الخيل; A critical edition of a classical Islamic legal text by Salah al-Din al-Ala'i, prepared and annotated by Qasmi)
- 'Uyūn al-Madhāhib (Arabic: عيون المذاهب; A critical edition of a classical Islamic legal text by Qiwām al-Dīn al-Kākī al-Ḥanafī, prepared and annotated by Qasmi)
- Chand Nāmwar ‘Ulamā (Urdu: چند نامور علماء; transl. Eminent Scholars – a collection of biographical essays)
- Ashkon se Bhara Daman, Zakhmon se Bhara Seena (Urdu: اشکوں سے بھرا دامن زخموں سے بھرا سینہ; transl. A Bosom Full of Wounds and a Lap Full of Tears – a reflective autobiographical work written after personal loss)
- Tabindah Nuqūsh (Urdu: تابندہ نقوش; transl. Illuminated Impressions – a biographical anthology of around ninety essays on scholars and thinkers, focusing on religious and intellectual personalities across India and abroad)
- Wajh Jadīd lil-Salafiyyah: Kitāb al-Diyūbandiyyah fī al-Mīzān (Arabic: وجه جديد للسلفية: كتاب (الديوبندية) في الميزان; transl. A New Face of Salafism: The Book “al-Diyūbandiyyah” in the Balance)

Qasmi translated into Arabic one of the Urdu treatises of Muhammad Qasim Nanautawi, which was published under the title Al-Kawn Yashhad bi-Wujūd al-Ilāh (Arabic: الكون يشهد بوجود الإله) in 1399 AH / 1979 CE.

In addition to these books, Qasmi has published numerous research papers and articles on theology, law and literature in both Arabic and Urdu. Many of his writings were first published in periodicals and later compiled into volumes. His contributions to Arabic journalism—particularly through Al-Daie—played an important role in disseminating the academic and literary output of Darul Uloom Deoband to the Arab world. His research primarily focuses on Islamic jurisprudence and applied fiqh, as reflected in his work with the Islamic Fiqh Academy (India) and the Ministry of Awqaf in Kuwait.
