= Munawar =

Munawar, Munawwar, or Monowar is a unisex given name and surname of Arabic origin. Notable people with the name include:

== Given name ==
=== Monowar ===
- Monowar Khan Afridi (1900–1968), Pakistani Army officer and malariologist
- Monowar Hossain Chowdhury (1948–2026), Bangladeshi politician
- Monowar Hossain (born 1984), Bangladeshi cricketer
- Monowar Hussain, Indian politician
- Monowar Hossain Khan (born 1964), Bangladeshi politician

=== Munawar ===
- Munawar Faruqui (born 1992), Indian stand-up comedian
- Munawar Ahmed Gill (born 1956), Pakistani politician
- Munawar Hasan (1941–2020), Pakistani politician
- Munawar Hussain (1914–2003), Pakistani cricket umpire
- Munawar Iqbal (born 1948), Pakistani tennis player
- Munawar Khan, Pakistani politician
- Munawar Ali Khan (1930–1989), Indian singer
- Munawar Humayun Khan (died 2023), Pakistani social worker
- Munawar Saeed (born 1941), Pakistani actor
- Munawar Shakeel (born 1969), Pakistani poet
- Munawar Sultana (1924–2007), Indian actress
- Munawar Sultana (singer) (1925–1995), Pakistani radio and film singer
- Munawar Ali Wassan, Pakistani politician
- Munawar Zarif (1940–1976), Pakistani actor and comedian

=== Munawwar ===
- Munawwar Ali (1891–1951), Pakistani politician, lawyer, and poet
- Munawwar Hussain (1943–2023), Pakistani cricketer
- Munawwar Ali Khan (1924–2013), Pakistani cricketer
- Munawwar Sultan Nadwi (born 1979), Indian Islamic scholar
- Munawwar Qari (1878–1931), Uzbek journalist
- Munawwar Rana (1952–2024), Indian poet
- Munawwar uz Zaman (1951–1994), Pakistani field hockey player

== Surname ==
- Agil Munawar (born 1996), Indonesian footballer
- Raheela Yahya Munawar (born 1957), Pakistani politician
- Rezwan Munawar (born 1964), Afghan folklore singer
- Sheheryar Munawar (born 1988), Pakistani actor and film producer
- Yandi Munawar (born 1992), Indonesian footballer
