= Omar Abedeen Qasmi Madani =

Indian Islamic scholar (b. 1981)

Maulana, Mufti Omar Abedeen Qasmi Madani
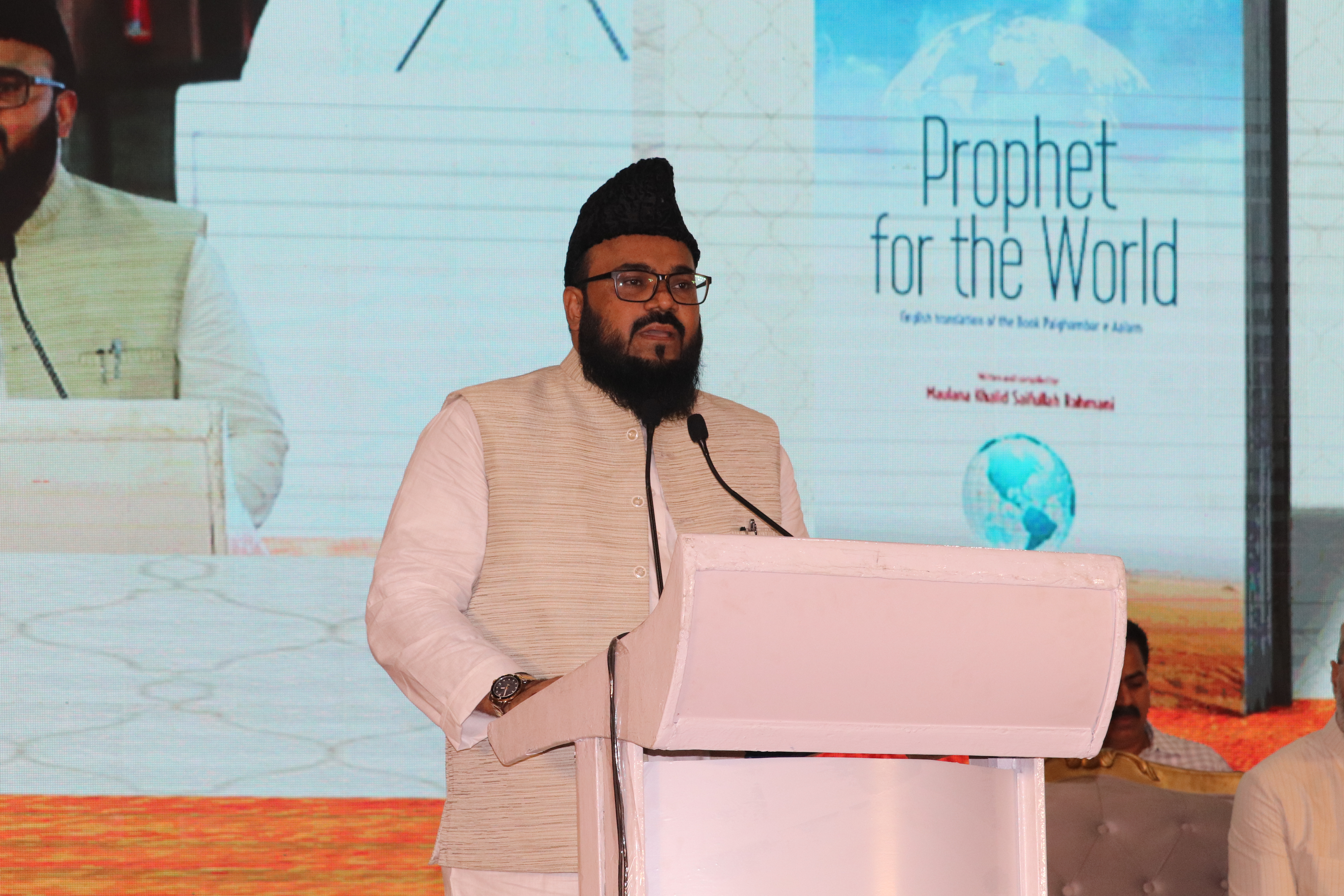
- Madani, announcing at the launch ceremony of his father Khalid Saifullah Rahmani's book Prophet for the World, on 14 September 2024.
- Born: Omar Abedeen; 13 October 1981 (age 44)
- Occupations: Islamic scholar, mufti, writer, researcher, educational trainer
- Parent: Khalid Saifullah Rahmani (father)
- Relatives: Mujahidul Islam Qasmi (great-uncle); Zafar Abedeen Nadwi (brother)

Academic background
- Education: Aalimiyyah, Fazīlah, B.A, Double M.A
- Alma mater: Darul Uloom Sabil-us-Salam, Hyderabad; Darul Uloom Deoband; Al Mahadul Aali Al Islami, Hyderabad; Maulana Azad National Urdu University; Osmania University; Islamic University of Madinah

Academic work
- Notable works: Uloom-ul-Hadīth; Hindustān Mein Islam Ki Aamad Aur Ishā'at; Huqūq Aur Unki Kharīd-o-Farokht; Qurān-e-Karīm: Aadāb o Ahkām; Ulama-e-Hind Ki Chand Aham Qurani Khidmāt
- Website: learndeenwithabedeen.com

Omar Abedeen Qasmi Madani is an Indian Islamic scholar, Mufti, and writer who serves as the deputy director of Al Mahadul Aali Al Islami, Hyderabad. He is an alumnus of Darul Uloom Sabil-us-Salam in Hyderabad, Darul Uloom Deoband, Al Mahadul Aali Al Islami, Maulana Azad National Urdu University, Osmania University, and the Islamic University of Madinah. He has authored several books, including Uloom-ul-Hadīth, Hindustān Mein Islam Ki Aamad Aur Ishā'at, Huqūq Aur Unki Kharīd-o-Farokht, Qurān-e-Karīm: Aadāb o Ahkām, and Ulama-e-Hind Ki Chand Aham Qurani Khidmāt.

== Early life and education ==
=== Background ===
Omar Abedeen Qasmi Madani was born on 13 October 1981. His father is Khalid Saifullah Rahmani.

According to Zafeeruddin Miftahi, Madani's family belongs to a long-established scholarly lineage from Jale, Bihar, known for its contributions to Islamic education and public service. His great-great-grandfather, Maulana Abdul Ahad, was among the early graduates of Darul Uloom Deoband and a classmate of Izaz Ali Amrohi under Mahmud Hasan Deobandi. Abdul Ahad's son, Hakim Zainul Abedeen, was a physician and scholar, while another son, Qazi Mujahidul Islam Qasmi, later served as President of the All India Muslim Personal Law Board. Khalid Saifullah Rahmani, Madani's father, is Zainul Abedeen's son, making Mujahidul Islam Qasmi his great-uncle. This lineage places Madani within a family closely connected to Deobandi scholarship and Islamic jurisprudence traditions.

=== Education ===
{Clarify|somehow he completes a two and four year program simultaneously}After completing the Dars-e-Nizami course at Darul Uloom Sabil-us-Salam, Hyderabad, in 1999, he pursued the final year of the curriculum, specializing in Hadith studies, at Darul Uloom Deoband in 2000 and received a certificate of excellence. From 2002 to 2004, he completed a two-year Mufti course, a one-year diploma in manuscript research, and a one-year diploma in English language, all at Al Mahadul Aali Al Islami, Hyderabad. In 2004, he completed a BA in History and Sociology at Maulana Azad National Urdu University, Hyderabad. In 2006, he received an MA in Urdu literature from Osmania University. In 2010, he completed a four-year BA in Hadith at the Islamic University of Madinah. In 2015, he completed a MA (Islamic Studies) at Maulana Azad National Urdu University.

== Career ==
=== Teaching ===
From 2010 to 2016, Madani taught as a lecturer in Hadith and Jurisprudence at Al Mahadul Aali Al Islami, Hyderabad. From 2013 to 2016, he chaired the Islamic Courses (Department of Islamization of Textbooks). Between 2013 and 2014, he served as a Mufti on Munsif TV Hyderabad's question-and-answer program Rāh-e-Hidāyat (transl. The Path of instruction), and from 2014 to 2016, he served as a Mufti on ETV Hyderabad's program Sharī'at Ki Roshni Main (transl. In the Light of Shariah). In March 2024, he gave a speech titled Ramadan Ka Paigham (transl. The Message of Ramadan) on ETV Hyderabad's program Raunaq-e-Ramadan.

=== Administrative roles ===
He is the Deputy Director of Al Mahadul Aali Al Islami, Hyderabad; the General Secretary of the All India Milli Council, Telangana; a member of the International Union of Muslim Scholars (Doha, Qatar); and an Islamic legal adviser for IndiaZakat.com. He also serves as the President of the Imam Foundation for Training and Development, UK (India branch), the Friday Imam and Khatib at Jubilee Hills Mosque and Islamic Centre, and a member of the editorial board for the magazines Bahs-o-Nazar and Al-Modawana (Morocco). Additionally, he directs e-Madrasah (Learn Deen with Abedeen).

=== Public engagement ===
Between 2013 and 2016, Madani appeared on religious television programs such as Rāh-e-Hidāyat on Munsif TV and Sharī'at Ki Roshni Main on ETV Hyderabad, where he answered viewers’ questions on Islamic jurisprudence. In 2024, he also addressed audiences on ETV Urdu’s Ramadan special, Raunaq-e-Ramadan.

=== Guidance during the pandemic ===
During the COVID-19 pandemic, Madani was active in guiding the community on religious observances under lockdown. He advised Muslims to stay at home and pray during Shab-e-Baraat in 2020, citing Islamic principles of preserving human life and compliance with government health guidelines. He also instructed those observing Eid-ul-Fitr that year to pray at home with family instead of gathering in mosques, and supported the movement encouraging people to donate their Eid shopping budget to the needy. Madani highlighted that Islamic prayers like Chaasht could be performed individually at home as acts of gratitude.

== Political views ==
=== Social and religious issues ===
According to The Times of India, while talking about Islamic feminism, Madani said that Islamic Shariah has given women the right and authority to terminate their marriages through Khul' if their husbands subject them to oppression and deprive them of their rights.

In connection with raising the slogan Bharat Mata, Madani said that love for the country and worshipping it are two separate subjects that should not be confused with each other. "Without worshipping it, one can love the country as much as any other countryman. The person is like any other patriot."

During the COVID-19 pandemic, he stated that taking the vaccine while fasting is permissible and does not break the fast, citing a hadith from Sahih al-Bukhari that emphasizes precautionary measures during a pandemic.

=== Waqf legislation and related developments ===
Madani expressed concerns over the Waqf Amendment Bill, 2024. He criticized the bill for attempting to undermine the Waqf system and highlighted the unconstitutional inclusion of Hindus on Waqf panels. He emphasized that Waqf is a religious act, and the amendments could obstruct its purpose.

In September 2025, Madani, as an office bearer and convener of the Waqf Act Protest Committee for Telangana (WAPCTG), responded to the Supreme Court’s interim ruling on the Waqf (Amendment) Act, 2025. While welcoming certain aspects of the judgment, such as the Court’s refusal to accept that Waqf property could lose its status when questioned as government land, he described other parts as unsatisfactory. Abedeen objected to the proposal for determining whether a person had been practising Islam for five years before creating an endowment, arguing that a person attains full religious identity upon declaring the Islamic faith. He also criticized the inclusion of non-Muslim members in Waqf bodies, calling it unconstitutional, and reiterated that the committee would continue to safeguard both Sharia and constitutional rights through its “Save Waqf Campaign.”

In April 2025, following a terror attack on tourists in Pahalgam, Kashmir, Madani, serving as the spokesperson of the All India Muslim Personal Law Board (AIMPLB) for Andhra Pradesh and Telangana, condemned the attack, describing it as a "failure of the security apparatus." He expressed deep sorrow over the killings, extended condolences to the bereaved families, and emphasized that there is no place for violence in a democracy. As a mark of respect and solidarity, he announced a three-day mourning period and declared the suspension of AIMPLB’s ongoing protests against the Waqf Board Amendment Act.

=== Public statements and community appeals ===
In October 2024, Madani condemned recent communal conflicts in Telangana, urging swift police intervention to restore peace and prevent divisive narratives. He highlighted the need for immediate action to curb activities and rhetoric that could increase communal tensions, reflecting his commitment to fostering unity in the region.

In early November 2024, Madani urged the Telangana government to release caste survey forms in Urdu and English to ensure accessibility and clarity for the public. He emphasized that many people are unaware of the information required for the ongoing survey and that providing forms in these languages, even as PDFs, would help them participate more effectively in the process.

== Views on social and community issues ==
=== Community welfare ===
Madani has spoken about the economic hardships faced by huffaz and imams during the COVID-19 lockdown, noting that their income largely depends on leading Taraweeh prayers in Ramadan, which could not take place due to restrictions.

He has also expressed concern over pilgrims being unwittingly used as couriers by unscrupulous travel agents, arguing that fundamental community needs such as income, education, and healthcare should be prioritized over non-obligatory pilgrimages like Umrah.

=== Social harmony ===
Madani has warned against the use of social media in fueling sectarian tensions, emphasizing that religious debates should remain in scholarly contexts and not be misused to create discord.

== Literary works ==
=== Research and writing ===
Madani researched the hadiths included in the first volume of his father Khalid Saifullah Rahmani's Kitab al-Fatawa. He Islamized more than 30 school curriculum books from the first to the fifth grade and organized two dozen national and international conferences. He has presented papers in Urdu, Arabic, and English at over 100 seminars.

=== Books ===
His works include:

- Uloom-ul-Hadīth
- Hindustān Mein Islam Ki Aamad Aur Ishā'at (Arrival and Spread of Islam in India)
- Huqūq Aur Unki Kharīd-o-Farokht (Rights and their purchase and sale)
- Qurān-e-Karīm: Aadāb o Ahkām (The Holy Quran: Etiquette and Commandments)
- Ulama-e-Hind Ki Chand Aham Qurani Khidmāt (Some important Quranic services of Indian scholars)
- Islam Aur Amn-e-Aalam (Islam and world peace)
- Fiqh-e-Hanafi Ki Kitāb Halabi Kabīr Ke So Ahādīth Ki Takhrīj (Research work on the hundred hadiths of Ibrahim al-Halabi's Halabi Kabir, a book of Hanafi jurisprudence)
