= Abul Kalam Rasheed Alam =

Indian politician

Member of Assam Legislative Assembly
- Incumbent
- Assumed office 2016
- Preceded by: Monowar Hussain
- Constituency: Goalpara East

Personal details
- Born: Abul Kalam Rasheed Alam; 01-01-1972 Mandia Bardaloni
- Party: Indian National Congress

Abul Kalam Rasheed Alam is an Indian politician from Assam. He was elected to the Assam Legislative Assembly from Goalpara East in the 2016 and 2021 Assam Legislative Assembly election as a member of the Indian National Congress.
