= Al Mahadul Aali Al Islami, Hyderabad =

Islamic seminary in India

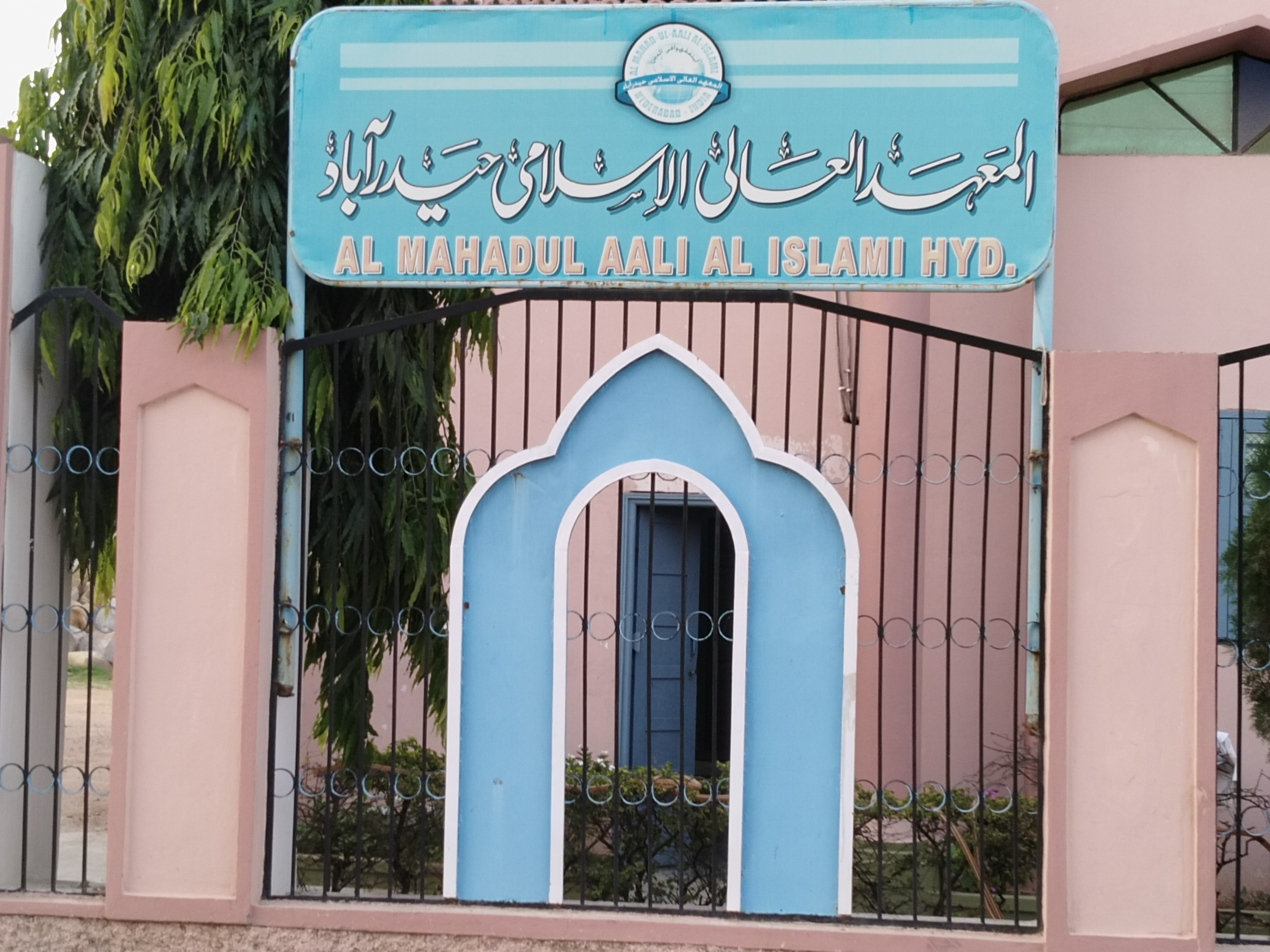
- The signboard of Al Mahadul Aali Al Islami, Hyderabad
- Type: Islamic Institute
- Established: January 2000; 26 years ago
- Founder: Khalid Saifullah Rahmani
- Director: Khalid Saifullah Rahmani
- Location: Mustafa Hills, Quba Colony, Hyderabad, Telangana, India; 17.2959°N 78.4667°E
- Website: almahad.org/

Al Mahadul Aali Al Islami, Hyderabad, also written as Al Mahad Al Aali Al Islami or Al Mahad Ul Aali Al Islami, is an Islamic institute located in Hyderabad, Telangana. It was founded in January 2000 by Khalid Saifullah Rahmani. The primary goal of its establishment is to train fresh graduates from Islamic institutions in various Islamic subjects. It also provides training in modern topics such as Islamic finance, banking, and the stock market.

== History ==
Al Mahadul Aali Al Islami was established in 2000 (1420 AH) by Khalid Saifullah Rahmani who serves as the fifth president of the All India Muslim Personal Law Board. The institute is in Hyderabad, Deccan. It was registered in 1999. It trains new graduates of Islamic seminaries in various Islamic disciplines. The inaugural event took place on 30 January 2000 (Shawwal 22, 1421 AH) at the Ujale Shah Eidgah in Akbarbagh, Saidabad, Hyderabad. Its current Deputy Director is Rahmani's son, Omar Abedeen Qasmi Madani.

=== Courses and departments ===
The seminary offers courses like specialization in the Qur'an Sciences, specialization in Hadith, specialization in Islamic Jurisprudence, specialization in Islamic Finance, specialization in Da'wah, diploma in English language and literature (DELL), etc. Similarly, there are other departments, such as the Department of Religious Studies and Comparative Religions, the Department of Research and Compilation, the Department of Ifta, and the Center for Peace and True Message.

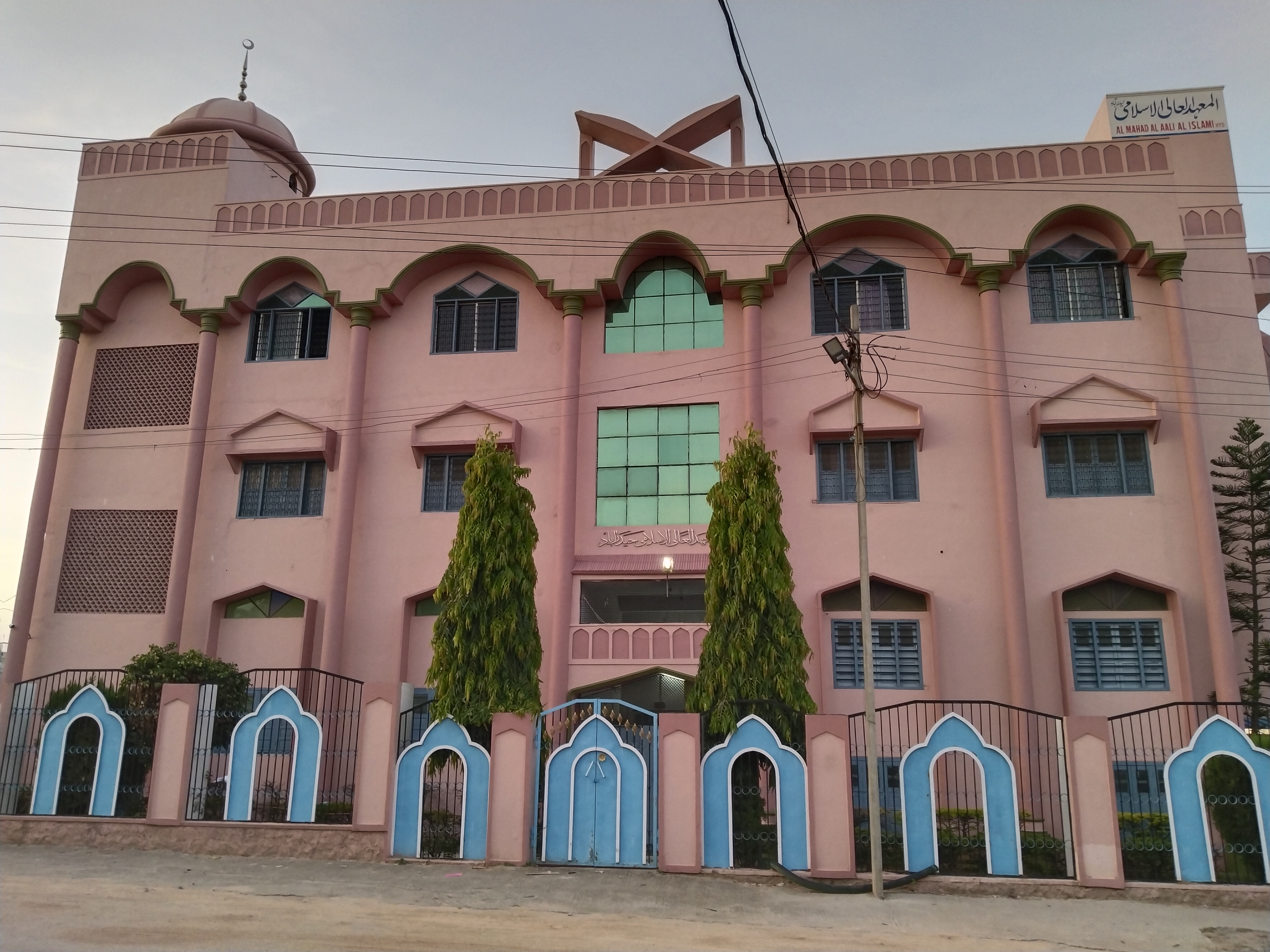
The main building of Al Mahadul Aali Al Islami, Hyd

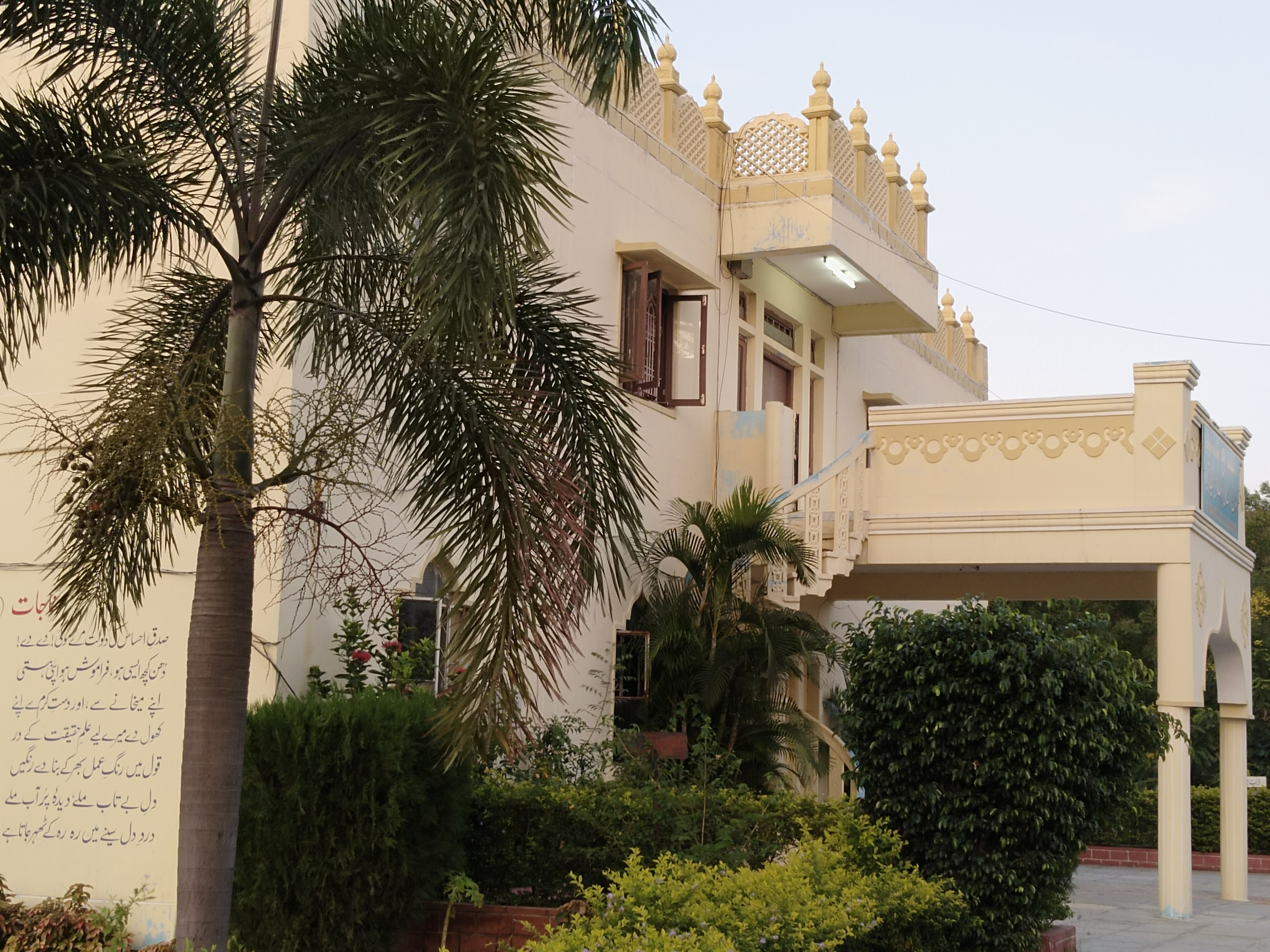
The academic building of Al Mahadul Aali Al Islami, Hyd

== Journals ==
The institute first issued a quarterly Hira, which eventually became an annual issue, before ceasing publishing. After the demise of Qazi Mujahidul Islam Qasmi, Khalid Saifullah Rahmani was appointed editor-in-chief of the quarterly Bahs-o-Nazar, which is currently published by the institution.

== See also ==
- Muhammad Azam Nadwi
- Omar Abedeen Qasmi Madani
- Munawwar Sultan Nadwi
- Osama Idris Nadwi
