= Muhammad Azam Nadwi =

Indian Islamic scholar (born 1984)

Dr., Mufti Muhammad Azam Nadwi
- محمد أعظم الندوي
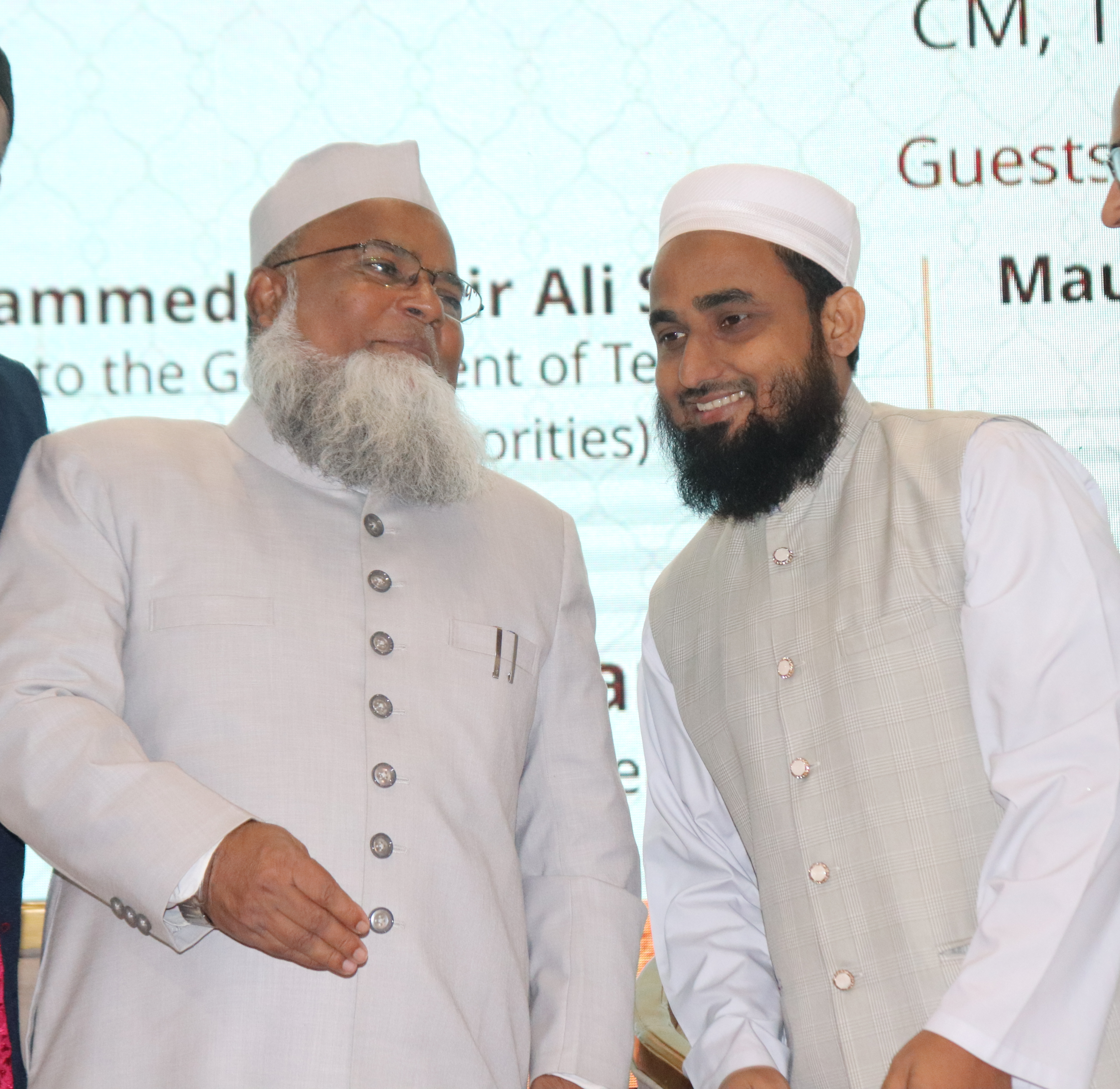
- Left: Khalid Saifullah Rahmani, Right: Muhammad Azam Nadwi, during the launch of Rahmani's book "Prophet for the World", held on 14 September 2024.
- Born: 15 December 1984 (age 41); Jamshedpur, Bihar, India (now in Jharkhand)
- Occupations: Islamic scholar, writer, professor
- Known for: Arabic and Urdu writings on Islamic jurisprudence and reform

Academic background
- Education: Darul Uloom Nadwatul Ulama (ʿĀlimiyyat, Faḍīlah); University of Lucknow (B.A.); Maulana Azad National Urdu University (M.A., M.Phil., Ph.D.)
- Thesis: Ph.D. — Intertextuality in the Modern Literary Criticism & its Manifestations in the Writings of Shaikh Abul Hasan Ali Al Hasani Al Nadwi (2023); M.Phil. — Biographical Works of Mohammad Akram Nadwi on Indian Eminent Personalities: An Analytical & Critical Study (2017)
- Doctoral advisor: Mohammad Sharfe Alam

Academic work
- Era: Contemporary
- Region: South Asia
- Language: Urdu; Arabic
- Main interests: Islamic jurisprudence (Fiqh); Arabic literature; Islamic thought; Contemporary Muslim identity
- Notable works: Muḥsin-e-Insāniyyat; Mukhtārāt min Uṣūl al-Fiqh; Koronā’ī Adab; Arabic article on Iqbal: al-Dhāt fī Adab-i-Iqbāl

Muhammad Azam Nadwi (born 15 December 1984) is an Indian Islamic scholar, writer, and professor, recognized for his work in Arabic literature and Islamic jurisprudence. He has authored and translated numerous scholarly articles and books in both Arabic and Urdu, focusing on Islamic law, contemporary Muslim identity, and classical scholarship. Nadwi currently teaches Islamic sciences including Ḥadīth and Fiqh at Al Mahadul Aali Al Islami, Hyderabad.

== Early life and education ==
Muhammad Azam Nadwi was born on 15 December 1984. His father, Sayyid Hussain Ahmad ‘Ārif Gayāwī (1941–2020), was an Islamic scholar and Urdu poet, and a student of Syed Fakhruddin Ahmad. He served as the imam and khatib of the Jāmiʿ Masjid in Sakchi, Jamshedpur (Jharkhand), for 27 years, from 1983 to 2010.

He memorized the Qur’an and received certification in Qirā’ah from Madrasa Hussainia, Jamshedpur and Madrasa Hussainia, Kadru. He then pursued traditional Islamic studies and completed the ʿĀlimiyyah course at Darul Uloom Nadwatul Ulama, Lucknow, followed by the Faḍīlah specialization in Islamic jurisprudence (Fiqh) in 2004 a qualification considered equivalent to a Master’s degree in Islamic Studies. He later obtained a Bachelor's degree from the University of Lucknow, and subsequently earned an M.A. in Arabic language and literature from Maulana Azad National Urdu University, Hyderabad.

He was awarded an M.Phil. in Arabic from the same university in 2017 for a dissertation titled Biographical Works of Mohammad Akram Nadwi on Indian Eminent Personalities: An Analytical and Critical Study, supervised by Abdul Quddoos, Associate Professor in the Department of Arabic. On 1 March 2023, he received his Ph.D. in Arabic from the same university for a dissertation titled Intertextuality in the Modern Literary Criticism & its Manifestations in the Writings of Shaikh Abul Hasan Ali Al Hasani Al Nadwi, under the supervision of Assistant Professor Mohammad Sharfe Alam.

== Career ==
Nadwi previously served as a teacher at Jāmiʿat al-Imām Aḥmad ibn ʿIrfān al-Shahīd in Malihabad, and currently teaches Hadith, Fiqh, and Arabic at Al Mahadul Aali Al Islami, Hyderabad, where he also serves as coordinator of the Department of Culture.

He also serves as the Imam and Khatib of Masjid-e-Baqi in Banjara Hills, Hyderabad, where he is recognized as the resident scholar. He is also a member of the International Union of Muslim Scholars.

He also participated in international scholarly seminars, including one held in Rabat, Morocco, organized by ICESCO and the International Institute of Islamic Thought.

He served as one of the chief editors of the Arabic monthly journal Risālat al-Shabāb, published since 2003 by the Markaz-e-Islāmī of Jamʿiyyat Shabāb al-Islām in Lucknow.

== Literary works ==
=== Urdu Writings ===
Nadwi has authored several Islamic jurisprudential and socio-religious articles in Urdu. His work often engages with contemporary issues through a legal and ethical lens. Notable examples include Bank se Jāri Hone Wāle Mukhtalif Kārd kā Shar‘ī Ḥukm (transl. Legal Ruling on Various Bank-Issued Cards), which explores the permissibility and implications of modern financial instruments, and WhatsApp Group: Kitne Mufīd, Kitne Muḍir? (transl. WhatsApp Groups: How Useful, How Harmful?), which discusses the benefits and harms of digital communication platforms.

=== Arabic Articles ===
In addition to his Urdu writings, Nadwi has published numerous research articles in Arabic on literature, history, and socio-political themes. He has also translated several Islamic jurisprudential texts between Urdu and Arabic.

Furthermore, he translated Faiz Ahmad Faiz’s well-known Urdu poem "Hum Dekhenge" into Arabic under the title "Naḥnu Narā'" (Arabic: نحن نرى).

==== On Iqbal ====
His article titled al-Dhāt fī Adab Iqbāl: Mafhūmuhā, wa Maʿālim Bināʾihā, wa Dawruhā fī al-Nuhūḍ al-Ḥaḍārī li-l-Ummah (transl. The Self in Iqbal’s Literature: Its Concept, Structure, and Role in the Civilizational Uplift of the Ummah) explores the philosophical concept of selfhood (khudi) in Iqbal’s poetry and its significance for cultural and civilizational renewal.

==== On Religious and Historical Figures ====
He has also written about scholars such as Muhammad Rabey Hasani Nadwi and Jafar Masood Hasani Nadwi.

His Arabic article Faḍīlat al-Shaykh Muḥammad Sālim al-Qāsmī wa Maqawwimāt Bināʾ Shakhṣiyyatihi al-Fadhdhah (transl. Virtues of Muhammad Salim Qasmi and the Pillars of His Unique Personality) was published in a commemorative volume by Hujjat al-Islam Academy, Darul Uloom Waqf, Deoband.

==== On Society and Identity ====
Other Arabic articles by Nadwi include al-Dawr al-Qiyādī li-l-Nisā’ al-Muslimāt fī Ḥarakat Taḥrīr al-Hind (transl. The Leadership Role of Muslim Women in India's Freedom Movement), Khuṭaṭ wa Khuṭuwāt Naḥwa Ibādah al-Muslimīn fī al-Hind (Muqāranah Taqrībiyyah maʿa Isbāniyā) (transl. Plans and Steps Toward the Extermination of Muslims in India (A Comparative Approximation with Spain)), al-Hujūm ʿalā al-Waqf: Iʿtidāʾ ʿalā al-Īmān wa al-Huwiyyah wa al-Dustūr (transl. Attack on Waqf: An Assault on Faith, Identity, and Constitution), and Mīthāq al-Madīnah wa Dustūr al-Hind: ʿAdlun Yajmaʿ wa Tanawwuʿun Yarfaʿ (transl. The Madinan Charter and the Constitution of India: Justice Unites, Diversity Elevates), which draws a comparative perspective between the Prophet Muhammad’s Charter of Medina and India’s Constitution, emphasizing their shared principles of justice, coexistence, and pluralism.

He also translated Wājib al-ʿUlamāʾ wa al-Fuqahāʾ fī al-Wāqiʿ al-Muʿāṣir (transl. Duties of Scholars in the Contemporary Context), an article by Khalid Saifullah Rahmani.

==== On Literary Criticism ====
Nadwi has also written on literary and exegetical themes. His article titled al-Tanāṣṣ al-Qurʾānī wa Tajalliyātuhu fī Kitāb "Mādhā Khasira al-ʿĀlam bi-Inḥiṭāṭ al-Muslimīn" lil-Imām Abī al-Ḥasan al-Nadwī (transl. Qur’anic Intertextuality and Its Manifestations in the Book "Maza Khasir al-Alam Bi Inhitatil Muslimeen") analyzes the role of Qur’anic allusions and rhetorical structure in one of Abul Hasan Ali Hasani Nadwi's most influential works.

==== On Travel Literature ====
His paper Muḥammad ibn Nasser al-Aboudi wa Riḥālātuhu ilā al-Hind (transl. Mohammed Nasser Al-Aboudi and His Travels to India) discusses the cultural and artistic insights of modern Arabic travel literature.

=== Books ===
He has authored, edited, and translated several works, including:

- Muḥsin-e-Insāniyyat Ṣallallāhu ʿalayhi wa sallam
- Mukhtārāt min Uṣūl al-Fiqh (a comprehensive work on the principles of Islamic jurisprudence)
- Il-Imām Muḥammad Qāsim al-Nānawtawi — an Arabic translation of a work by Khalid Saifullah Rahmani, supplemented with annotations by Nadwi himself.
- Koronā’ī Adab — an Urdu anthology on literature during the COVID-19 pandemic, compiled by Nadwi and featuring essays and poetry reflecting on the pandemic experience.
