= Muhammad Azhar Nomani =

Indian Islamic scholar and Sufi (1924–2017)

Maulana Muhammad Azhar Nomani

Rector, Madrasa Husainia, Ranchi
- In office 1958–2017
- Preceded by: Founding rector
- Succeeded by: Muhammad Qasmi

Personal life
- Born: 7 July 1924 Rathos, Madhubani district (then Darbhanga district), Bihar and Orissa Province, British India
- Died: 13 May 2017 (aged 92) Ranchi, Jharkhand, India
- Resting place: Kadru Graveyard, Ranchi
- Education: Darul Uloom Deoband
- Occupation: Islamic scholar, Sufi

Religious life
- Religion: Islam
- Denomination: Sunni
- Jurisprudence: Hanafi
- Movement: Deobandi

Muslim leader
- Teacher: Hussain Ahmad Madani

Muhammad Azhar Nomani (7 July 1924 – 13 May 2017), also known as Maulana Azhar Ranchwi, was an Indian Islamic scholar and Sufi. He was a student and authorised disciple (khalifa) of Hussain Ahmad Madani. In 1958, he co-founded Madrasa Husainia in Kadru, Ranchi, where he served as rector until his death. He also held leadership positions in Jamiat Ulama-e-Hind and was a member of the Majlis-e-Shura of Darul Uloom Deoband.

== Early life and education ==
Muhammad Azhar Nomani was born on 7 July 1924 in Rathos, Madhubani district (then part of Darbhanga district). His father, Sharafuddin, was also an Islamic scholar and had established Madrasa Mahmood al-Uloom in Damla, Madhubani district.

He received his early Arabic education at Madrasa Mahmood al-Uloom, Damla, and at Miftahul Uloom, Mau. In 1950, he enrolled at Darul Uloom Deoband and graduated in 1953.

In 1374 AH (1954), he studied Sahih al-Bukhari under Hussain Ahmad Madani. His classmates in the hadith program included Mujahidul Islam Qasmi and Abdul Haq Azmi.

== Career ==
After completing his studies, he spent several years travelling with his teacher Hussain Ahmad Madani and received authorization for spiritual initiation and succession from him.

He moved to Ranchi in 1956 and taught children at the local Jama Masjid. On 29 April 1958, he co-founded Madrasa Hussainia in Kadru, Ranchi, with Muhammad Fakhruddin Gayawi and remained its rector throughout his life. Alongside the establishment of the madrasa, he founded more than one hundred maktabs in the surrounding region, many of which later developed into formal madrasas.

From 1413 AH (1992) until his death, he served as a member of the Darul Uloom Deoband Majlis-e-Shura. Through Darul Uloom Deoband and Jamiat Ulama-e-Hind, he remained active in educational, religious, and social initiatives.

He also served as a member of the working committee and vice-president of Jamiat Ulama-e-Hind, and as joint president of Jamiat Ulama Bihar and Jharkhand. After Jharkhand became a separate organisational unit in 2009, he served as president of Jamiat Ulama Jharkhand until his death.

== Death and legacy ==
Muhammad Azhar Nomani died on 13 May 2017 (16 Sha'ban 1438 AH) in Ranchi. His funeral prayer was led the following day by Mahmood Asad Madani, and he was buried at Kadru graveyard.

According to Mahmood Madani, a large number of people attended the funeral, with visitors continuing to arrive at the cemetery from noon until evening.

He was survived by five daughters and three sons—Ahmad, Muhammad Qasmi, and Asjad—each of whom became Islamic scholars. Following his death, Muhammad Qasmi was appointed rector of Madrasa Husainia, having previously served as deputy rector since 1996.

== See also ==
- Madrasa Hussainia, Kadru
