= The Principle of Deference in Islamic Law =

The Principle of Deference to variant opinions in Islamic law (Arabic: قاعدة مراعاة الخلاف, romanized: qa'idat mura'at al-khilaf) is a legal rule defined by the Kuwaiti Encyclopedia of Islamic Jurisprudence as: “Whoever believes that something is permissible should refrain from doing it if someone else believes it is forbidden. Likewise, with regard to obligation, it is desirable for someone who sees the permissibility of something to do it if there are among the imams those who see it as obligatory.”

== Scholarly views ==
Some scholars take this rule, including:

- Al-Zarkashi
- Izz al-Din ibn 'Abd al-Salam
- Taj al-Din al-Subki
- al-Suyuti

Some of these scholars consider that staying out of a dispute is better than getting involved in it, and some of them say that being considerate of a dispute is a form of piety. Those who take this rule cite the Qur'an: “Avoid much suspicion; Indeed, some suspicion is sinful,” and the hadith: “Leave what makes you doubt you for what does not make you doubt.”

The scholars who do not take this rule include:

- Ibn Qayyim al-Jawziyya

== Conditions for application ==
Applying this principle requires certain conditions to be met.

- That observance does not lead to violating an established text of Sharia, and this includes two issues:
  - That observance does not lead to violating the Qur’an or the established Sunnah.
  - That observance does not lead to violating consensus (ijma').
- That it is impossible to combine the opinions of the scholars. If the imams disagreed about something with more than one opinion, and it was possible to combine their statements, those opinions would be combined and there would be no disagreement.
