= Zafeeruddin Miftahi =

Indian Mufti

Mawlāna, Mufti Zafeeruddin Miftāhi

2nd President of Islamic Fiqh Academy
- In office 2002 – 31 March 2011
- Preceded by: Mujahidul Islam Qasmi
- Succeeded by: Nematullah Azami

Personal life
- Born: 7 March 1926 Darbhanga, British India (present day Bihar, India)
- Died: 31 March 2011 (aged 85)
- Notable work(s): Compilation of the Fatāwa Darul Uloom Deoband of Azizur Rahman Usmani, Islām Ka Nizām-e-Masājid
- Education: Jamia Miftahul Uloom

Religious life
- Religion: Islam
- Denomination: Sunni Hanafi
- Movement: Deobandi

Muslim leader
- Students: Ishtiaque Ahmad Qasmi

Zafeeruddin Miftāhi (7 March 1926 – 31 March 2011) was an Indian Muslim scholar and jurist who served as a Mufti of Darul Uloom Deoband and the second president of Islamic Fiqh Academy. He compiled the religious verdicts of Azizur Rahman Usmani, called the Fatāwa Darul Uloom Deoband in twelve volumes and wrote books including Islām Ka Nizām-e-Masājid, Islām Ka Nizām Iffat-o-Asmat and Tārīkh-e-Masājid.

Miftāhi was an alumnus of Jamia Miftahul Uloom. He was a member of Board of Studies at the Sunni Theology department of Aligarh Muslim University. He served the Deoband seminary for fifty years and issued one hundred thousand religious edicts.

== Biography ==
Zafeeruddin Miftāhi was born on 7 March 1926 (22 Sha'ban 1344 AH) in Darbhanga. He received his primary education at home and was schooled at Madrasa Mahmudiya, in Terai, Nepal. He studied intermediate classes of Arabic and Persian at Madrasa Wāris al-Ulūm in Chhapra from 1933 to 1940. He graduated from the Jamia Miftahul Uloom where he studied from 1940 to 1944 with Habib al-Rahman al-'Azmi and Abdul Lateef Nomani. His other teachers include Hussain Ahmad Madani, Sulaiman Nadwi, Minatullah Rahmani, Abul Hasan Ali Nadwi and Muhammad Tayyib Qasmi.

After his graduation in 1944, Miftāhi taught at the Jamia Miftahul Uloom for one year and then moved to Ma'dan al-Ulūm in Lucknow where he taught for three years between September 1945 and January 1948. From January 1948 to 1956, he taught at Darul Uloom Muīnia in Begusarai, with a gap of one year in between; during which he taught at Jamia Islamia Talimuddin. In Shawwal 1364 AH, Miftāhi went to study at the Darul Uloom Nadwatul Ulama in Lucknow at Sulaiman Nadwi's suggestion and studied there for few months.

Miftāhi was first appointed in the Darul Uloom Deoband to compile fatawa. Between 1962 and 1972, he compiled the fatawa of Azizur Rahman Usmani in twelve volumes. In Safar 1385 AH, the executive council of Deoband seminary appointed him to write the editorial for Monthly Darul Uloom, which he continuously wrote for seventeen years. In 1993, he was appointed a Mufti in the Darul Ifta of Darul Uloom Deoband; a post he served till 21 August 2008. He served in the Deoband seminary for fifty years and wrote one lakh fatawa. He retired from Deoband on 22 August 2008 at a monthly pension of 2000 INR which he received throughout his life.

Miftāhi was a founding figure of the Islamic Fiqh Academy and became its president after Mujahidul Islam Qasmi. He was a member of Board of Studies at the Sunni Theology department of Aligarh Muslim University.

Miftāhi died on 31 March 2011. His funeral prayer was led by Saud Alam Qasmi, the former dean of the Faculty of Theology at Aligarh Muslim University on 1 April 2011.

== Literary works ==
Miftāhi compiled the religious verdicts of Azizur Rahman Usmani, commonly known as Fatāwa Darul Uloom Deoband in twelve volumes between 1962 and 1972. His discourses on the Quran, entitled Dars-e-Qur'ān, were published in ten volumes. He wrote biographical works about Muhammad Qasim Nanautawi, Manazir Ahsan Gilani and Muhammad Tayyib Qasmi. His other books include:

- Islām Ka Nizām-e-Masājid (Its English translation Mosque in Islam by Zaheerun Nabi was published in 1996 by Institute of Objective Studies, New Delhi).
- Islām Ka Nizām Iffat-o-Asmat (Its English translation Modesty and chastity in Islam was first published in Kuwait and second time by Qazi Publishers during 1993 in New Delhi. Persian translation was published as Hijāb-o-Iffat az Dīdgah-e-Islām in Tehran).
- Tārīkh-e-Masājid
- Mashāhīr Ulama-e-Deoband
- Darul Uloom: Qayām awr Iska Pas-e-Manzar
- Darul Uloom: Ek Azeem Maktab Fikr
- Nizām-e-Tarbiyyat (Darul Uloom Deoband has published its Arabic translation Ināyat al-Islām bi al-Tarbiyyat al-Atfāl).
- Islām Ka Nizām-e-Hayāt
- Jurm-o-Saza Kitāb-o-Sunnat Ki Roshni Mai
- Islāmi Hukūmat ke Naqsh-o-Nigār
- Islām ka Nizām-e-Amn
