= Jamea Tul Hidaya =

Islamic seminary in Jaipur, India

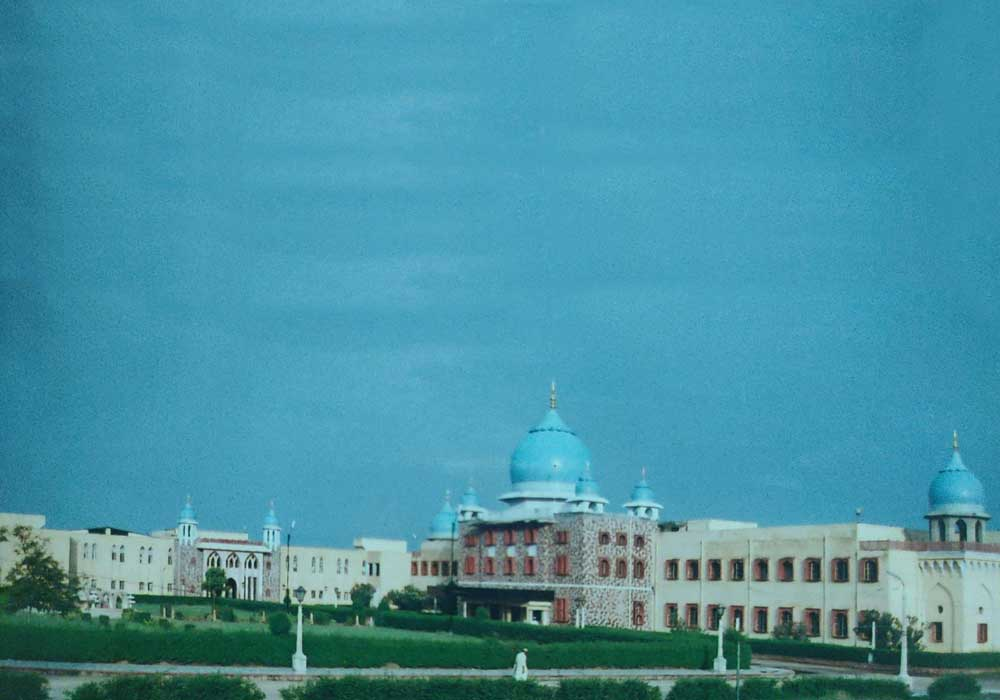
- Type: Islamic seminary
- Established: 1985 (40 years ago)
- Founders: Abdur Rahim Mujaddidi
- Rector: Fazlur Rahim Mujaddidi
- Address: Jamea Tul Hidaya, RAMGARH ROAD, NEAR MANPUR SDWA, P.O LAWAS, Jaipur, Rajasthan, India
- Website: jameatulhidaya.org

Jamea Tul Hidaya is an Islamic seminary, situated in Jaipur, in the Indian state of Rajasthan. It was established in 1985 by the Islamic scholar Abdur Rahim Mujaddidi.

== History ==
Jamea Tul Hidaya was established by Abdur Rahim Mujaddidi in 1985 at Jaipur. It has an institute called the Al-Hidaya Study Centre and Crescent Academy for Civil Services Exams where students are trained for various Indian civil service examinations. On 1 August 2021, the Jamea started its Ifta department. At Jamea Tul Hidaya, secular subjects such as computer application, electrical engineering, mechanical engineering and several others are taught alongside religious subjects. It has been called a hi-tech madrasa.

The Jamea Tul Hidaya has been called a third type of madrasa, the other two being the Darul Uloom Deoband and the Nadwatul Ulama. Indian madrasas follow these three patterns, each separately led by the Deoband seminary, the Nadwa and the Jamea Tul Hidaya.
