= Ateeque Ahmad Bastawi =

Indian Islamic scholar (b. 1954)

Mawlana, Mufti Ateeque Ahmad Bastawi
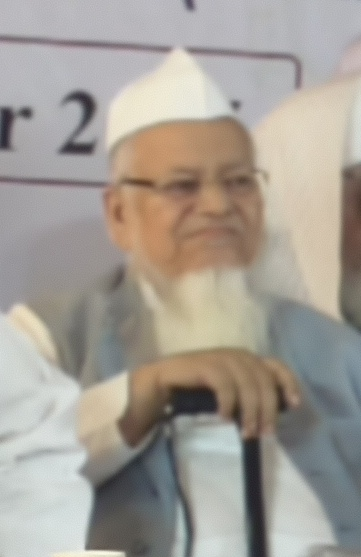
- Bastawi attending the 34th Fiqhi Seminar of the Islamic Fiqh Academy (India), held in Jamshedpur, Jharkhand, in 2025.
- Born: 25 January 1954 (age 72); Basti, Uttar Pradesh, India
- Education: Madrasa Noorul Uloom, Bahraich; Darul Uloom Deoband
- Occupations: Islamic scholar, mufti, teacher, writer
- Notable work: Masārif-e-Zakat; Islami Nikāh; Hindustan aur Nizam-e-Qaza; Hindustan mein Nifaz-e-Shariat; Mustalahat-e-Fiqhi; Dawlat-e-Usmania aur Turkey ki Tareekh

Ateeque Ahmad Bastawi (born 25 January 1954), also written as Ateeque Ahmad Qasmi Bastawi and Ateeq Ahmed Bastavi, is an Indian Islamic scholar, jurist, and writer. He has been serving as a professor of Hadith and Fiqh at Darul Uloom Nadwatul Ulama, Lucknow, since 1980. He is also the secretary of the Majlis-e-Tahqiqat-e-Shariah at Darul Uloom Nadwatul Ulama, the academic secretary of the Islamic Fiqh Academy, India, and the convener of the Dar-ul-Qaza Committee of the All India Muslim Personal Law Board. Bastawi is the founder and president of Ma'had-ush-Shariah in Lucknow and has authored and translated several notable works in Urdu on Islamic jurisprudence and theology.

== Early life and education ==
Ateeque Ahmad Bastawi was born on 25 January 1954, in Basti, a district in the Indian state of Uttar Pradesh. His father's name is Muhammad Rafique.

He began his education at a maktab in his hometown. He studied Arabic from the elementary to the intermediate level at Madrasa Noor-ul-Uloom in Bahraich. For further education, he enrolled at Darul Uloom Deoband and graduated in the Dars-e-Nizami curriculum in 1973. In 1974, he completed the Ifta course there. He also passed the Alim examinations from the Allahabad Board.

== Career ==
Since 1980, Bastawi has been serving as a teacher of Hadith and Fiqh at Darul Uloom Nadwatul Ulama in Lucknow. He serves as the Academic Secretary of the Islamic Fiqh Academy, India; the Qazi-e-Shariah of Darul-Qaza, Lucknow; the founder and president of Ma'had-ush-Shariah in Lucknow; and the Convener of the Department of Qaza of the All India Muslim Personal Law Board. Since February 2020, he has also been serving as the Secretary of the Fiqh Institute, Majlis-e-Tahqiqat-e-Shariah, at Darul Uloom Nadwatul Ulama, Lucknow.

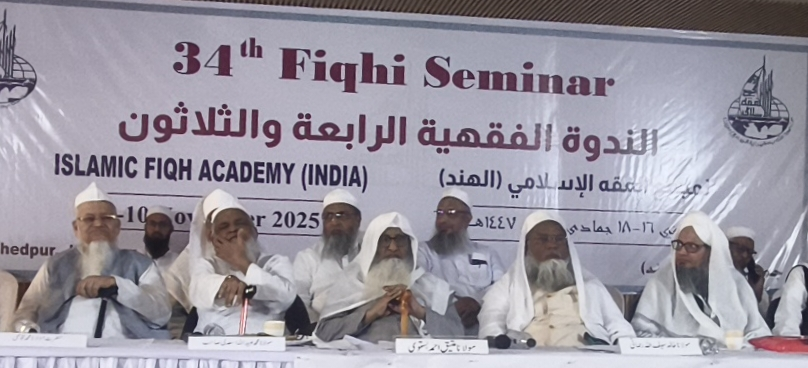
Bastawi (first from the right) at the 34th Fiqhi Seminar of the Islamic Fiqh Academy (India), held in Jamshedpur, Jharkhand, in 2025.

== Views ==
In November 2017, responding to the Indian government's move to criminalize instant triple talaq (talaq-e-bid'ah), Bastawi acknowledged the government's legislative intent but expressed reservations regarding the details. He stated: "It is good if the government creates legislation to discourage the practice. However, we are not against triple talaq. We do not have details on exactly what they intend to do." His comments came amid growing concerns from various Muslim groups about the government's unilateral approach.

In May 2017, during the concluding session of Jamaat-e-Islami Hind's nationwide Muslim Personal Law Awareness Campaign, Bastawi emphasized that Islamic Shariah is a divine system and cannot be altered by any government or court. He remarked, "No government or court will be able to make any change in our Shariat if we Muslims remain firm on it. When we ignore Shariat, courts and governments get opportunity to interfere in it." He also urged Muslims to avoid taking personal disputes to civil courts and instead recommended setting up Shariah-based counselling centers and panchayats in every Muslim locality to resolve issues such as marriage, divorce, and inheritance.

In March 2016, regarding the appointment of women as qazis in Kanpur and Jaipur, Bastawi clarified that Islamic law does not prohibit the appointment of women qazis. He stated: "The need to appoint a woman qazi was not felt because women can easily get their matters resolved through a male qazi. But if a need has been felt to appoint women as qazis, it is possible under Shariah. There is scope in Islam." However, he criticized the process of these appointments, asserting that they were not made by any established institution like the Darul Qaza of the All India Muslim Personal Law Board, and therefore lacked religious legitimacy.

== Literary works ==
Bastawi primarily has a temperament inclined toward Fiqh and research. To date, dozens of his scholarly, juristic, and research articles have been published in Arabic journals both in India and abroad, along with over two hundred Urdu articles that have appeared in periodicals across the Indian subcontinent. Even before joining Darul Uloom Nadwatul Ulama in 1980, his articles had begun to be published in the monthly Al-Furqan, Lucknow.

He has translated several Arabic and Persian books, including the Urdu translation of Jamaluddin Atiyyah's Al-Tanzir Al-Fiqhi as Fiqh-e-Islami Ki Nazariyah Sazi, Atiyya's Al-Nazariyah Al-Ammah Lil-Shariah Al-Islamiyyah as Islami Shariat Ka Amoodi Nazariyah, and Syed Muhammad Zahir Hasani's Persian book Khair-ul-Masālik into Urdu. Similarly, he has published various books with his research and annotations, including Şihabetdin Märcani's Nāzūratul Haqq fi Fardiyyatil Isha Wa In Lam Yaghb Al-Shafaq, Rahmatullah Kairanawi's Izālat Al-Shukūk (in four volumes), and Ashraf Ali Thanwi's Al-Hīlah An-Nājizah.

His works include the following books:

- Masarif-e-Zakat (Uses of Zakat)
- Zakat aur Mas'ala-e-Tamleek (Zakat and the Issue of Ownership)
- Islami Nikah (Islamic Marriage)
- Hindustan aur Nizam-e-Qaza (India and the Islamic Judicial System)
- Hindustan mein Nifaz-e-Shariat (Implementation of Shariah in India)
- Mustalahat-e-Fiqhi (Terminologies of Islamic Jurisprudence)
- Chand Ashab-e-Fazeelat (Some Distinguished Companions)
- Fikr ki Ghalti (Waheed Khan Sahib ke Afkar ka Tanqeedi Jaaiza) (The Error of Thought: A Critical Analysis of Wahiduddin Khan's Ideologies)
- Dawlat-e-Usmania aur Turkey ki Tareekh (The History of the Ottoman Empire and Turkey, in three volumes)
- Īsai Missionaries ki Sargarmiyan aur Musalman (Activities of Christian Missionaries and Muslims)
- Sahabi ki Tareef aur Sahaba ke Maqam wa Martaba ke Bare Mein Ghalat Fehmiyon ka Izala (Clarifying Misunderstandings About the Definition of a Sahabi and the Status and Rank of the Sahaba).
- Hindustan mein Muslim Personal Law ka Mas'ala (The Issue of Muslim Personal Law in India)
- Islam ka Nizam-e-Mīrāth (The Islamic System of Inheritance)
- Islami Sazain aur Jurm ka Roktham (Islamic Punishments and Crime Prevention)

== See also ==
- List of Deobandis
