= Jamia Arabia Masoodia Noorul Uloom =

Islamic seminary in Bahraich, Uttar Pradesh, India

Jamia Arabia Masoodia Noorul Uloom, Bahraich
- جامعہ عربیہ مسعودیہ نور العلوم، بہرائچ
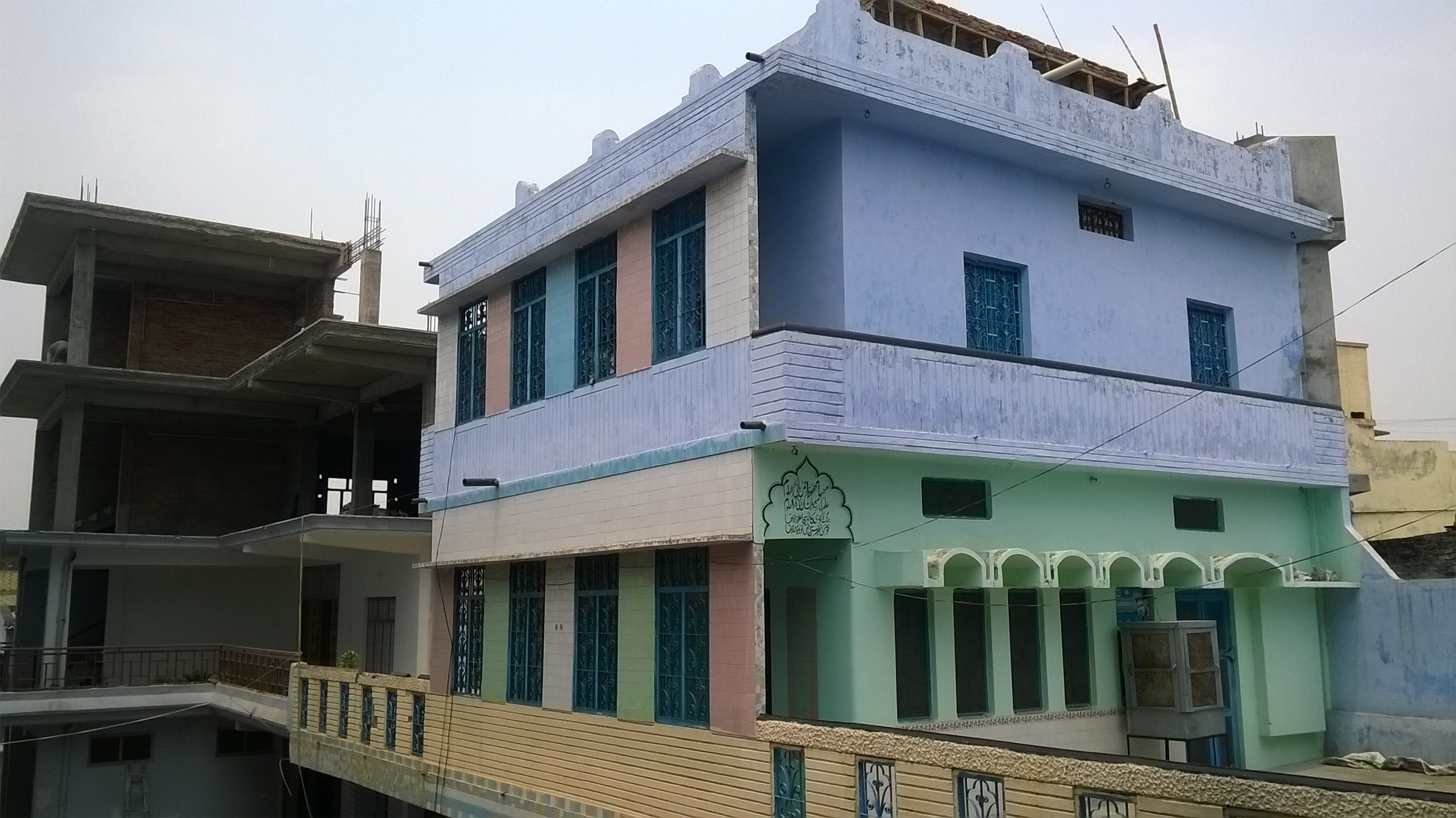
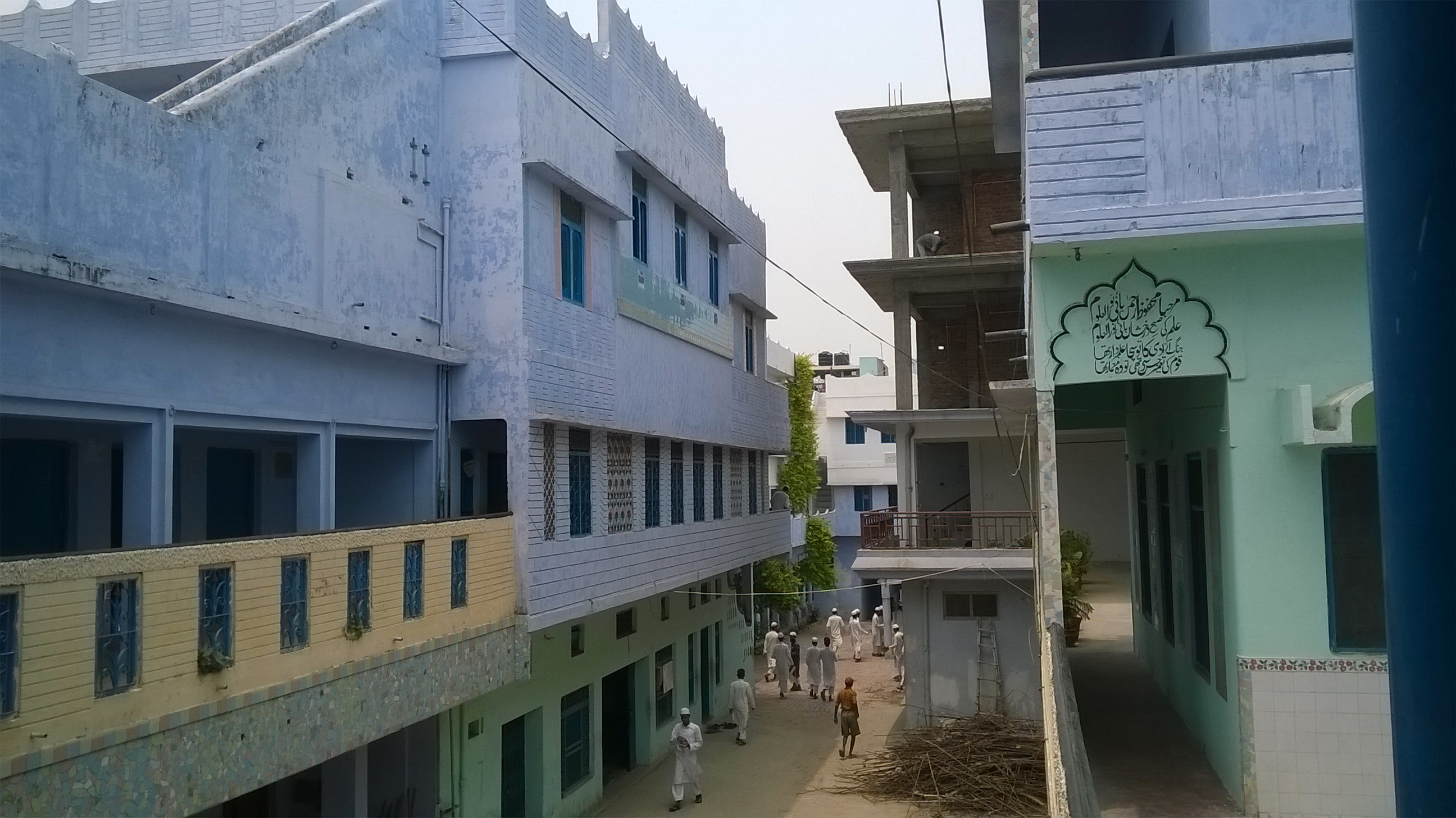
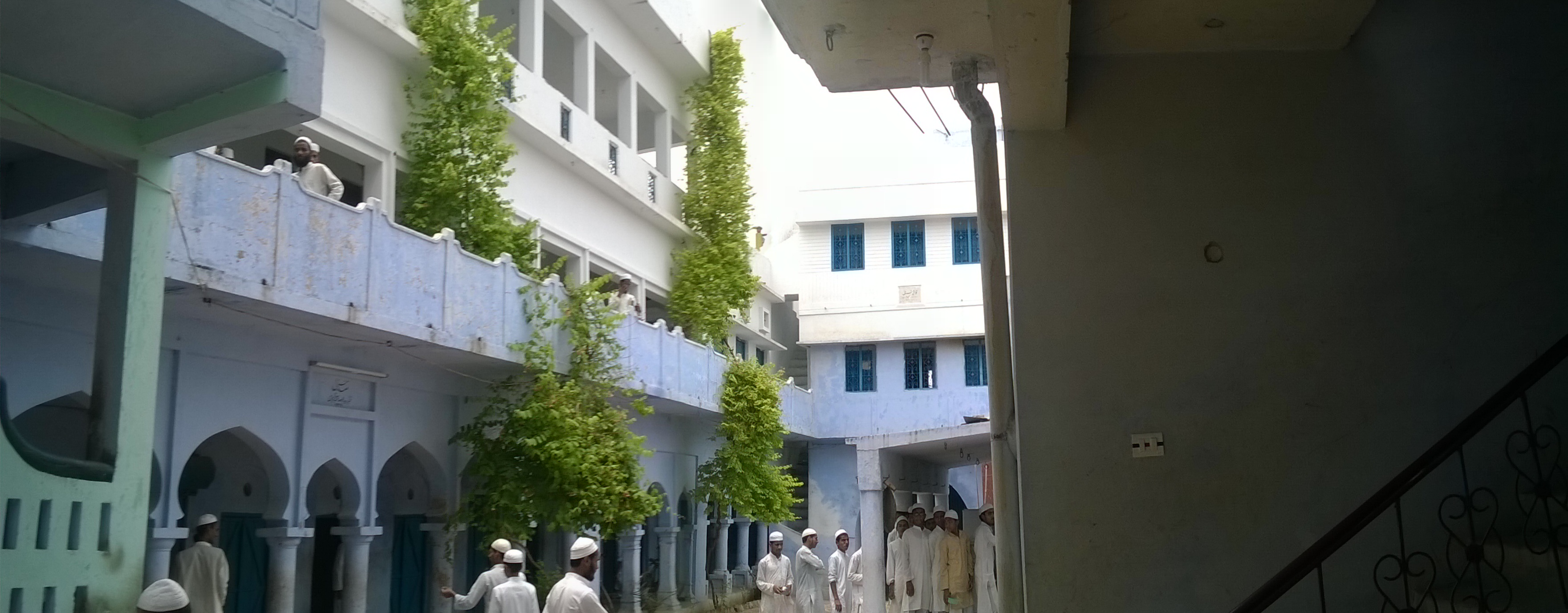
- Type: Darul uloom
- Established: 29 March 1931; 95 years ago
- Founders: Mahfoozur Rahman Nami
- Rector: Zubair Ahmad Qasmi
- Students: 950
- Location: HHGQ+GC6, Qazipura, Qazipura South, Bahraich, Uttar Pradesh, India; 271801

Jamia Arabia Masoodia Noorul Uloom, also known as Noorul Uloom Bahraich, is the oldest Islamic saminary belonging to the Deobandi school of thought in the Bahraich City of the Indian state of Uttar Pradesh.

== History ==
Jamia Arabia Masoodia Noorul Uloom (then Madrasa Arabia Noorul Uloom) was founded in Qazipura, Bahraich, on 1 Dhu al-Qadah 1349 AH (29 March 1931 AD) by Mahfoozur Rahman Nami, after the demise of his father Noor Muhammad Bahraichi, on the suggestion of Khwaja Khalil Ahmad Shah, a freedom fighter and political leader of the Indian Congress Party in Bahraich. At the time of independence, Nami also founded a modern educational institution, Maulana Azad Noorul Uloom High School, now known as Azad Inter College, in Bahraich in 1948 for the promotion and dissemination of contemporary studies.

In January 1937, the seminary established a private school teaching leather goods manufacturing under the name Noorul Uloom for the Economic Development of Underprivileged Muslim Youth, which was also given an annual grant of Rs. 600 by the government through the Department of Industries.

Graduates there are known by the suffix Noori.

=== In the Independence movement ===
The people of this seminary have also participated in the independence movement in India. In connection with the Quit India Movement, Salamatullah Baig Qasmi, a former principal of the madrasa, went to jail. Kaleemullah Noori, a former working rector of the saminary, in his student days, on the instructions of his teachers, joined Mahatma Gandhi's Satyagraha movement in 1941, and in this connection, he had to spend more than a year in the jails of Bahraich and Gonda. He worked under the Quit India Movement in 1942 in order to remain associated with the freedom movement until the independence of India. Both of them were given the title of freedom fighter during the ministry of Indira Gandhi.

== Administration ==
The first rector of the institution was Muhammad Ehsanul Haq and the current rector of the institution is Zubair Ahmad Qasmi.

Abdul Hafeez Balyawi, the author of the bilingual Arabic-Urdu dictionary Misbahul Lughat and the third editor of Monthly Darul Uloom, was an academic staff member and the warden (Arabic: ناظر الكلية) of the seminary.

The following is a list of the seminary's rectors, vice rectors, and working rectors.

Name		Term of office	
1	Muhammad Ehsanul Haq	1931	September 1945
2	Mahfoozur Rahman Nami	September 1945	February 1946
3	Muhammad Ehsanul Haq	February 1946	September 1954
4	Fazl-e-Haq	September 1954	December 1956
5	Muhammad Ehsanul Haq	December 1956	January 1961
6	Muhammad Iftikhar-ul-Haq	January 1961	January 2008
7	Kaleemullah Noori: (as vice rector; as working rector)	July 1958; August 1989	August 1989; May 2000
8	Hayatullah Qasmi: (as vice rector; as working rector; as rector)	August 1989; June 2000; March 2008	May 2000; March 2008; January 2018
9	Zubair Ahmad Qasmi	January 2018	"in office"

== Notable alumni ==
The notable alumni of Jamia Arabia Noorul Uloom, Bahraich, arranged alphabetically by their names:

- Abdur Rahim Bastawi, Teacher at Darul Uloom Deoband
- Abid Ali Salarganji
- Abdul Ali Farooqi, Principal of Darul Uloom Farooqia and Editor of Al-Badr magazine, Kakori, Lucknow
- Abdul Bari Qazipurvi
- Abdul Latif Latif Bahraichi
- Abdul Razzaq Sonipati
- Aziz Ahmad Noori Akbarpurvi
- Ateeque Ahmad Bastawi, Teacher of Hadith and Fiqh, Darul Uloom Nadwatul Ulama, Lucknow
- Habib Ahmad A'ma, Gadri
- Hakim Abu al-Barkat, Kolkata
- Junaid Ahmad Banarasi
- Mohammed Ilyas Barbankavi
- Muhammad Irfan Baig Fakhrpuri
- Muhammad Noman Baig Fakhrpuri
- Muhammad Zakaria Qasmi Sambhali, Sheikhul Hadith, Darul Uloom Nadwatul Ulama, Lucknow
- Muhibb-ur-Rahman Baliyawi
- Mumtaz Ahmad Barabankavi
- Rahat Ali Khan Nanparvi
- Shabbir Ahmad Darbhangvi
- Shakeel Ahmad Sitapuri, Former Teacher at Darul Uloom Deoband

== Publications ==
- Monthly Noorul Uloom, publishing since February 2006.
