= Imam Rabbani Senior Secondary Public School =

Coordinates: 26°55′37″N 75°50′09″E

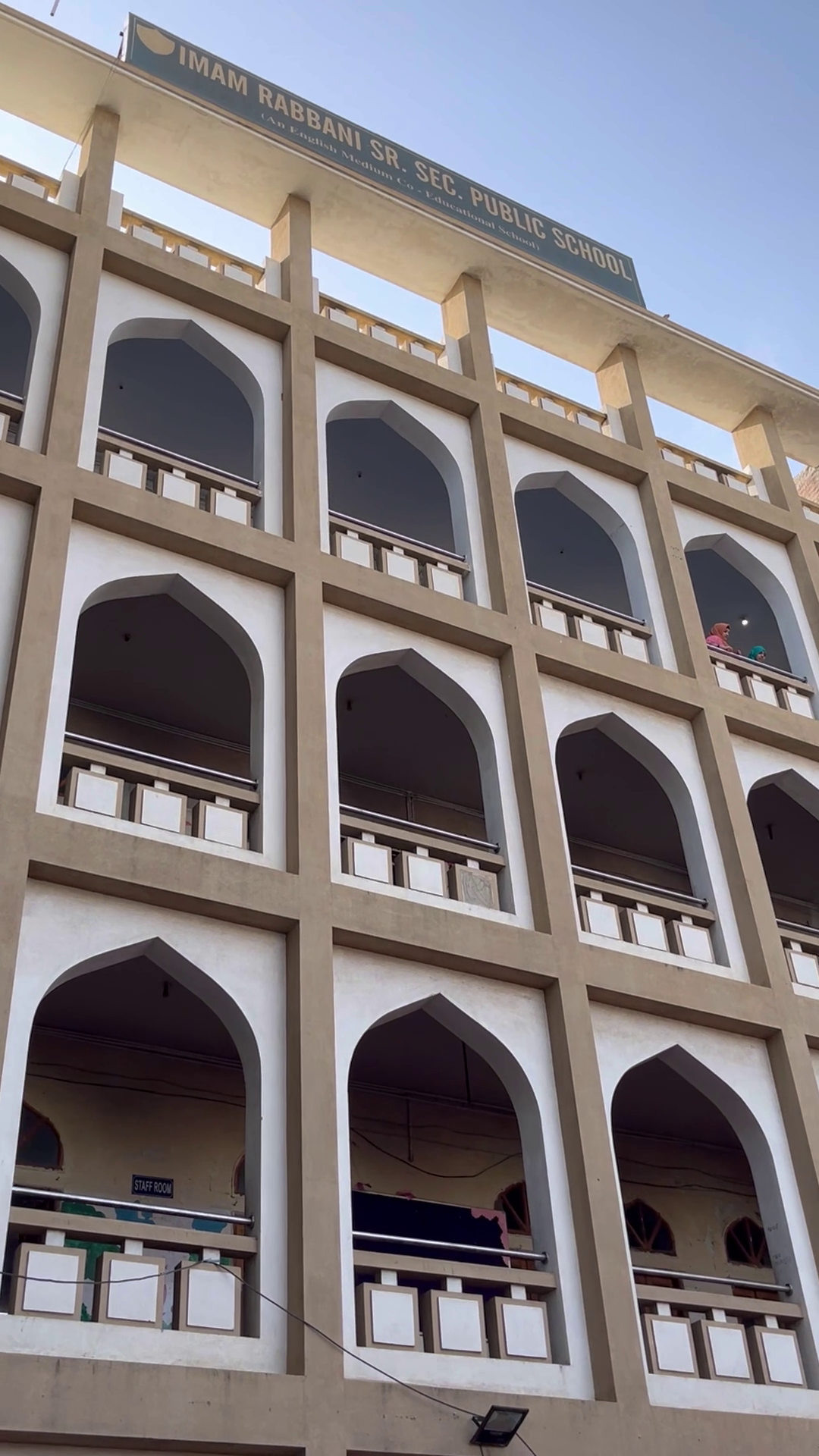
- School Building

Location
- 4650 Hidayat Bagh Char Darwaza, Subhash Chowk; Jaipur, Rajasthan 302002; India

Information
- Founded: 1996
- Founder: Fazlur Rahim Mujaddidi
- School board: RBSE
- Principal: Dr. Mohammed Shoaib
- Grades: KG - 12
- Enrollment: More than 3000 students
- Language: English
- Affiliations: Rajasthan Board of Secondary Education
- Contact No.: 0141 - 2601221
- Vice-Chairperson: Dr. Samra Sultana
- Website: imamrabbanischool.com

Imam Rabbani Senior Secondary Public School is a co-educational English-medium residential school in Jaipur, Rajasthan, India. Founded in 1996 by Fazlur Rahim Mujaddidi Sahab, the school provides education to students from pre-primary through 12th grades.
