= Goalpara East Assembly constituency =

Assembly constituency of Assam

Goalpara East
- Constituency No. 14 for the Assam Legislative Assembly

Constituency details
- Country: India
- Region: Northeast India
- State: Assam
- Division: Lower Assam
- District: Goalpara
- Lok Sabha constituency: Dhubri
- Established: 1967
- Reservation: None

Member of Legislative Assembly
- 16th Assam Legislative Assembly
- Incumbent Abul Kalam Rasheed Alam
- Party: Indian National Congress
- Elected year: 2026

Goalpara East Assembly constituency is one of the 126 assembly constituencies of Assam Legislative Assembly in the northeastern state of Assam, India. Goalpara East is part of Dhubri Lok Sabha constituency.

== Members of Legislative Assembly ==
Year	Member	Party
1967	B. K. Ghose	Independent
1972	Balabhadra Das	Indian National Congress
1978	Birendra Nath Choudhury	Communist Party of India (Marxist)
1983	Mohammad Ali	Independent
1985	Maziruddin Ahmed	Independent
1991	Ratneshwar Das	Indian National Congress
1996	Jyotish Das	Asom Gana Parishad
2001	Shadeed Mazumder	Nationalist Congress Party
2006	Dulal Chandra Ghosh	Nationalist Congress Party
2011	Monowar Hussain	All India United Democratic Front
2016	Abul Kalam Rasheed Alam	Indian National Congress
2021	Abul Kalam Rasheed Alam	Indian National Congress
2026	Abul Kalam Rasheed Alam	Indian National Congress

== Election results ==
=== 2026 ===
2026 Assam Legislative Assembly election: Goalpara East
Party	Candidate	Votes	%	±%
INC	Abul Kalam Rasheed Alam	102,205	46.99	−11.32
AGP	Abdur Rahim Zibran	50,944	23.42	−11.54
RD	Abdur Rashid Mandal	37,520	17.25	New
AIUDF	Hafiz Bashir Ahmed	7,838	3.6	New
NOTA	None of the above	1,578	0.73	−0.15
Margin of victory		51,261	23.57	+0.22
Turnout		2,17,511		
Rejected ballots				
Registered electors				
INC hold		Swing		

=== 2021 ===
2021 Assam Legislative Assembly election: Goalpara East
Party	Candidate	Votes	%	±%
INC	Abul Kalam Rasheed Alam	112,995	58.31	+14.80
AGP	Jyotish Das	67,747	34.96	N/A
NOTA	None of the above	1,706	0.88	+0.15
Margin of victory		45,248	23.35	+21.87
Turnout		1,93,768	95.5	+4.86
Rejected ballots				
Registered electors				
INC hold		Swing		

=== 2016 ===
2016 Assam Legislative Assembly election: Goalpara East
Party	Candidate	Votes	%	±%
INC	Abul Kalam Rasheed Alam	57,374	33.51	+18.85
BJP	Gauranga Prasad Das	54,793	32.03	+29.68
AIUDF	Shadeed Mazumder	27,778	16.22	−10.65
Independent	Abul Kalam Hussain	12,138	7.08	N/A
AITC	Elbarth Marak	7,172	4.18	+3.70
NPP	Punam Chand Sharma (Lilu)	6,710	3.91	N/A
NCP	Kofil Uddin Ahmed	971	0.56	−0.96
Independent	Birmal Ray	770	0.44	N/A
BRP	Soleman Ali	592	0.34	N/A
Independent	Naren Sankar Rabha	495	0.28	N/A
RPI(A)	Mehbubar Rahman	483	0.28	N/A
Independent	Mujaharul Islam	447	0.26	N/A
SUCI(C)	Abdul Hamid	420	0.24	−0.24
NOTA	None of the above	1,064	0.62	N/A
Majority		2,581	1.48	
Turnout		1,71,207	90.64	+4.71
Registered electors		1,88,875		
INC gain from AIUDF		Swing	+14.75	

=== 2011 ===
2011 Assam Legislative Assembly election: Goalpara East
Party	Candidate	Votes	%	±%
AIUDF	Monowar Hussain	36,353	26.78	+6.10
AGP	Jyotish Das	34,511	25.43	+5.85
Independent	Shadeed Mazumder	23,580	17.37	N/A
INC	Dulal Chandra Ghosh	19,898	14.66	−5.79
Independent	Elbarth Marak	13,102	9.65	+3.67
BJP	Mono Mohan Nath	3,195	2.35	+1.22
NCP	Jesmina Islam	2,069	1.52	−25.61
Independent	Arun Das	1,662	1.22	N/A
AITC	Gole Rahman	665	0.48	N/A
SUCI(C)	Azhar Hussain	657	0.48	N/A
Majority		1,842	1.35	−5.10
Turnout		1,35,692	85.93	+4.29
AIUDF gain from NCP		Swing	+15.86	

=== 2006 ===
Assam Legislative Assembly election, 2006: Goalpara East
Party	Candidate	Votes	%	±%
NCP	Dulal Chandra Ghosh	34,370	27.13	
AIUDF	Abul Kalam Hussain	26,193	20.68	
INC	Shadeed Mazumder	25,901	20.45	
AGP	Jyotish Das	24,803	19.58	
Independent	Elbarth Marak	7,572	5.98	
Independent	Mokaddes Ali Mondal	2,367	1.87	
BJP	Gobinda Kalita	1,427	1.13	
Independent	Husnejeha Begum	1,323	1.04	
AGP(P)	Kalyan Kumar Das	850	0.67	
NBNP	Sahjahan Ali	566	0.45	
Independent	Gole Rahman	522	0.41	
JD(U)	Safiul Islam	441	0.35	
LJP	Shayema Mazumder	339	0.27	
Majority		8,177	6.45	
Turnout		1,26,674	81.64	
NCP hold		Swing		
