= Khwaja Khalil Ahmad Shah =

Indian politician and independence activist (1890–1965)

- Born: 9 December 1890; Qazipura, Bahraich, North-Western Provinces, British India
- Died: 1965 (aged 74–75); Bahraich, Uttar Pradesh, India
- Occupations: Politician, social worker, and educationist
- Known for: Member of the Legislative Council of the United Provinces of Agra and Oudh, Contributions to Education and Social Development in Bahraich
- Notable work: Fasādi Mullā yā Dushmanān-e-Islām kā Agent, Hindustan-e-Qadeem aur Islam (Hissa-e-Awwal)
- Office: Member of the Legislative Council of the United Provinces of Agra and Oudh (1927)
- Political party: Indian National Congress
- Father: Ahmad Shah

Khwaja Khalil Ahmad Shah (9 December 1890 – 1965) was an Indian politician, social leader, freedom fighter, and writer. He served as a member of the Legislative Council of the United Provinces of Agra and Oudh in 1927. Associated with the Indian National Congress, he was involved in initiatives for social and educational improvement in Bahraich and worked for the development of the region.

== Early life and education ==
Khwaja Khalil Ahmad Shah was born on 9 December 1890 in the Qazipura locality of Bahraich. His father, Ahmad Shah, was of Kashmiri origin, having migrated to Bahraich. Shah belonged to a respected family; one of his brothers, Khwaja Akbar Shah, was a barrister. Though not formally highly educated, Shah was known for his intellectual pursuits and maintained a personal library of rare and valuable books.

== Career ==
Shah was an active member of the Indian National Congress and held close ties with leaders like Jawaharlal Nehru.

Shah was a member of the Legislative Council of the United Provinces of Agra and Oudh in 1927. His attendance and active participation in the 21 December 1927 session confirm his role. On 17 November 1927, he raised several questions in the council regarding audit objections, financial irregularities, and administrative affairs of the Bahraich District Board, reflecting his deep engagement with public issues.

He was a prominent figure in the Indian independence movement. In 1941, he was sentenced to one year of rigorous imprisonment and fined 100 rupees under the Defence of India Act 1915 for his participation in the Individual Satyagraha movement. During the Quit India Movement in 1942, he was detained for nearly nine months under the same act.

He was also a member of the committee managing the shrine of Ghazi Saiyyad Salar Masud and contributed to the establishment of Jamia Arabia Masoodia Noorul Uloom, an Islamic educational institution in Bahraich. Additionally, he served on the Nagar Palika (Municipal Board) of Bahraich. It is also mentioned that he was the head, administrator, and guardian of the aforementioned shrine.

== Literary works ==
Shah's works include:

- Fasādi Mullā yā Dushmanān-e-Islām kā Agent (transl. Troublemaking Clerics or Agents of the Enemies of Islam)
- Hindustan-e-Qadeem aur Islam (Hissa-e-Awwal) (transl. Ancient India and Islam (Part One))

== Death and legacy ==
Shah died in 1965 and was buried in Chhadey Shah Takiya Cemetery near Azad Inter College, Bahraich. He is remembered for his contributions to communal harmony and education in Bahraich.
