= Munawwar Sultan Nadwi =

Indian mufti and writer (born 1979)

- Born: 10 February 1979 (age 47); Bishanpur, Ekhata, Madhubani district, Bihar, India
- Education: Darul Uloom Nadwatul Ulama; Al Mahadul Aali Al Islami, Hyderabad
- Occupations: Islamic scholar, mufti, researcher, teacher, author
- Organization: Majlis-e-Tahqiqat-e-Shariah (Nadwatul Ulama)
- Known for: Fiqhi and research works; compilation of Fatawa Nadwatul Ulama
- Notable work: Nadwatul Ulama ka Fiqhi Mizaj aur Abna-e-Nadwa ki Fiqhi Khidmāt; Khawatīn ke Shar‘i Masa’il; Fiqh-e-Islami ke Masādir

Munawwar Sultan Nadwi (born 10 February 1979) is an Indian Islamic scholar, jurist, and author associated with Darul Uloom Nadwatul Ulama, Lucknow. He studied fiqh at Darul Uloom Nadwatul Ulama and completed advanced training in ifta and Qadha at Al Mahadul Aali Al Islami, Hyderabad. He serves as the Office Secretary and Academic Fellow of the Majlis-e-Tahqiqat-e-Shariah and teaches classical Islamic jurisprudence at Darul Uloom Nadwatul Ulama.

== Early life and education ==
Munawwar Sultan Nadwi was born on 10 February 1979 in Bishanpur neighbourhood, Ekhata, Madhubani district, Bihar, India. He received his early education at Madrasa Islamia Tofanpur, followed by studies at Madrasa Chashma-e-Faiz, Malmal. He later joined Darul Uloom Nadwatul Ulama, completing ‘Alimiyyah in 1999 and Fadhilat (specialization in fiqh) in 2001. He then studied Ifta and Qadha at Al Mahadul Aali Al Islami, Hyderabad and completed his course in 2003, where he also benefited from Khalid Saifullah Rahmani.

In 2002, he launched an annual journal, Nishan-e-Manzil, from his hometown Ekhatha, where he served as its founding editor-in-chief. Only two issues were published.

== Career ==
After completing his studies, Nadwi was appointed as a compiler of fatwas at the Dar al-Ifta of Darul Uloom Nadwatul Ulama. He is also a teacher at Darul Uloom Nadwatul Ulama, where he teaches al-Hidayah and as-Sirajiyyah. He serves as the Office Secretary and Academic Fellow at Majlis-e-Tahqiqat-e-Shariah, Deputy Editor of its quarterly Tahqiqat-e-Shariah journal, and a Shariah Advisory Council member of the Indian Muslim Chamber of Commerce and Industry. He has been the Executive Editor of Sada-e-Marwah (Lucknow) since 2016.

In September 2024, Nadwi moderated a symposium on the Waqf Amendment Bill organized by the Majlis-e-Tahqiqat-e-Shariah at Darul Uloom Nadwatul Ulama, Lucknow. In his introductory remarks, he stated that just as zakat provides economic strength to the Muslim community, waqf serves as a source of economic, social, and welfare development for all people, benefiting society at large.

=== Scholarly recognition ===
Nadwi's scholarly works and academic involvement have been cited and acknowledged in multiple university-level research studies. His Urdu book Nadwatul Ulama ka Fiqhi Mizaj aur Abna-e-Nadwa ki Fiqhi Khidmaat (2005) has been cited in academic research as the first comprehensive study on the juristic orientation of Nadwatul Ulama and the fiqhi contributions of its graduates. The doctoral thesis Role of Darul Uloom Nadwatul Ulama in Promoting Arabic Literature and Islamic Studies (Jawaharlal Nehru University, 2008) describes it as a pioneering and unique work in its field.

The same thesis includes Nadwi's work in its bibliography as one of the principal Urdu sources (al-Masadir al-Ra’isiyyah al-Urdiyyah) used for the study.

In another doctoral dissertation submitted to Aligarh Muslim University, Nadwi was mentioned as one of the key informants and research contributors regarding the life and thought of Abul Hasan Ali Nadwi. The thesis notes that he assisted the researcher in accessing Nadwatul Ulama’s library and relevant materials, and describes him as a disciple of Abul Hasan Ali Nadwi who was serving as a teacher at the seminary at that time.

== Literary works ==
Apart from translating several Arabic works into Urdu, Nadwi has presented papers in various academic and fiqhi seminars. His scholarly and analytical articles have appeared in journals and newspapers such as Tameer-e-Hayat, Bang-e-Hira, Bahs-o-Nazar (Hyderabad), and The Munsif Daily. He presently serves as an Academic Fellow at the Majlis-e-Tahqiqat-e-Shariah, Nadwatul Ulama. His authored and edited works include:

Authored works

- Nadwatul Ulama ka Fiqhi Mizaj aur Abna-e-Nadwa ki Fiqhi Khidmāt
- Khawatīn ke Shar‘i Masā’il
- Fiqh-e-Islami ke Masādir
- Huquq al-Mar’ah fi Dhou’ Fatawa al-‘Ulama al-Hunood (Arabic)
- Shimali Bihar ka ek Mardum Khaiz Qasbah (Ekhata-o-Atrāf aur Yahan ki Do Nāmwar Shakhsiyyāt)
- Baink Interest ke Masārif
- Majlis-e-Tahqiqat-e-Shariah Nadwatul Ulama (Mukhtasir Tareekh)
- Boorhe aur Mazooron ke Huqūq (Uswa-e-Nabawi ki Roshni Mein)

Edited and compiled works

- Fatawa Nadwatul Ulama (five volumes)
- Islami ‘Āili Qawāneen
- Fiqh-e-Hanafi: Tarīkh-o-Ta'āruf (based on the writings of Abd al-Hayy al-Lucknawi)
- Fiqh Islami aur ‘Asr-e-Hazir (articles of Mohammad Rabey Hasani Nadwi)
- Milne ke Nahīn, Nāyāb Hain Hum (selected obituaries of Amīnuddīn Shujāuddīn)
- Rūbarū (a compilation of interviews by Amīnuddīn Shujāuddīn)
- Da‘wati aur Ta‘leemi Maqasid ke liye Social Media ka Istemaal
- Awaami Maqamat par Namaz ka Mas’alah
- Tadween-e-Fiqh aur Chand Aham Fiqhi Mabāhith
