= Mahfoozur Rahman Nami =

Indian Muslim scholar

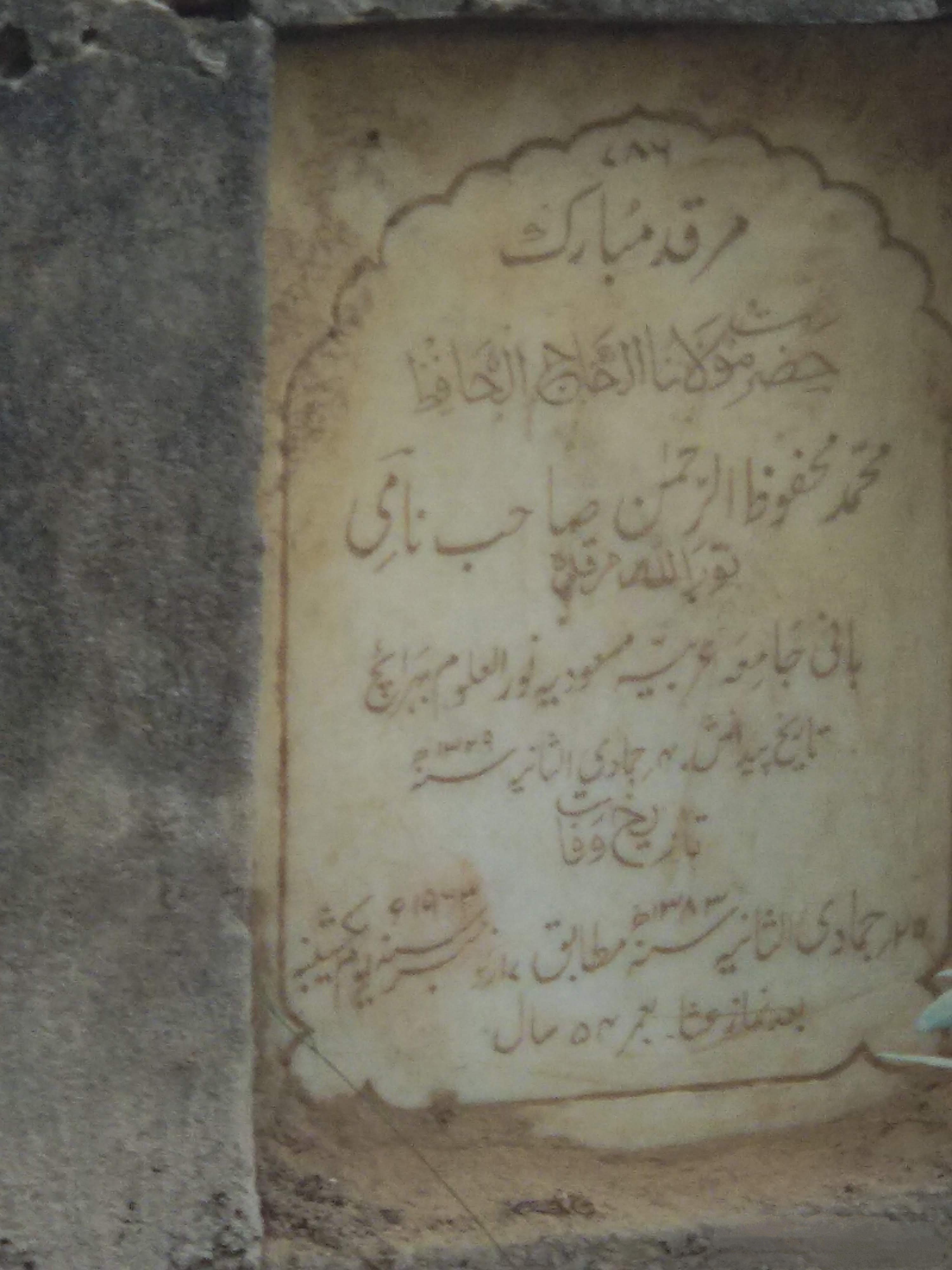
- Inscription on Grave of Nami

Member Uttar Pradesh Legislative Assembly
- In office 1946–1951

Personal details
- Born: May 1911 Rasra Balia
- Died: 17 November 1963 (aged 52) Bahraich, Uttar Pradesh
- Education: Jamia Miftahul Uloom, Darul Uloom Deoband

Religious life
- Religion: Islam
- Founder of: Jamia Arabia Masoodia Noorul Uloom & Azad Inter College Bahraich

Mahfoozur Rahman Nami (May 1911 – 17 November 1963) was an Indian Muslim scholar, politician and an author. He was an alumnus of Jamia Miftahul Uloom and Darul Uloom Deoband. He established Madrasa Nūr-ul-Ulūm and Azad Inter College in Bahraich.

== Biography ==
Nami was born in May 1911. He completed his primary studies at Jamia Miftahul Uloom with Abul Lateef Nomani and Habib al-Rahman al-'Azmi. Nami entered the Darul Uloom Deoband 1344 AH, where he studied with Hussain Ahmad Madani, Izaz Ali Amrohi and Ibrahim Balyawi. He graduated in 1348 AH.

Nami established Madrasa Nūr-ul-Ulum in Bahraich. He also established Maulana Azad Nur-ul-Ulūm High School, now known as Azad Inter College, in Bahraich. He contested the 1946 Indian provincial elections on the ticket of Indian National Congress. He served as the member of Uttar Pradesh Legislative Assembly from 1946 to 1951. He was the Parliamentary secretary in the Ministry of Education. In 1359 AH, Darul Uloom Deoband nominated him as a court member of Aligarh Muslim University along with Muhammad Tayyib Qasmi and Hifzur Rahman Seoharwi.

Nami died on 17 November 1963 in Bahraich and was buried near the grave of Shah Naeemullah Bahraichi.

== Literary works ==
Nani authored Miftah al-Quran, which has been adopted by Darul Uloom Azaadville, an Islamic seminary in Azaadville, in their curriculum. His other works include:

- Muallim ul Quran
- Rahmani Qiada
- Hilal Bagh
- Musalmanan-E-Hind ka Taleemi Masla

== Bibliography ==
- Asir Adrawi. Tazkirah Mashāhīr-e-Hind: Karwān-e-Rafta (in Urdu) (2 April 2016 ed.). Deoband: Darul Muallifeen. pp. 236–237.
- Qasmi, Ameer Ahmad (ed.). "Bāni Jamia Masoodia Nur-ul-Ulum Bahraich". Nur-ul-Ulum Ke Darakhshanda Sitāre [Shining stars of the Nur-ul-Ulum seminary] (in Urdu) (2011 ed.). Hafiz Zameer Ahmad. pp. 28–35.
- "Mahfoozur Rahman Nami's profile". Uttar Pradesh Vidhan Sabha Ki Karywahi (in Hindi). 243 (8). Uttar Pradesh Legislative Assembly: 1099. 14 December 1963.
