= Mujahidul Islam Qasmi =

Indian Mufti

Mawlana, Qazi Mujahidul Islam Qasmi قاضی مجاہد الاسلام قاسمی

President of All India Muslim Personal Law Board
- Succeeded by: Rabey Hasani Nadwi

1st President of Islamic Fiqh Academy
- In office "office established" – 4 April 2002
- Succeeded by: Zafeeruddin Miftahi

Personal details
- Born: 1936 Jale, Darbhanga, British India
- Died: 4 April 2002 (aged 65–66)

Personal life
- Education: Darul Uloom Deoband
- Relatives: Khalid Saifullah Rahmani (nephew); Omar Abedeen Qasmi Madani (grandnephew)

Religious life
- Religion: Islam
- Denomination: Sunni Hanafi
- Founder of: Islamic Fiqh Academy
- Movement: Deobandi

Muslim leader
- Disciple of: Hussain Ahmad Madani, Sayyid Minatullah Rahmani

Mujahidul Islam Qasmi (1936–4 April 2002) was an Indian Mufti, Qadhi and Islamic scholar, founder of Islamic Fiqh Academy. He served as the President of All India Muslim Personal Law Board.

== Biography ==
Qasmi was born in 1936 in Jale Darbhanga, British India. He was educated at Madrasa Mahmood al-Ulum, Damla and local madrasas of Mau, Uttar Pradesh and later joined Darul Uloom Deoband from where he graduated in 1955. In Deoband, he studied under Hussain Ahmad Madani, Syed Fakhruddin Ahmad and Abdul Haffeez Balyawi.

Qasmi taught in Jamia Rahmania in Munger and established Islamic Fiqh Academy in 1989. He was also a member of International Islamic Fiqh Academy, Jeddah, Fiqh Academy of Mecca and Aligarh Muslim University's court. He was founding member of All India Muslim Personal Law Board and was appointed as its president after the death of Abul Hasan Ali Nadwi in 1999. He launched All India Milli Council to bring Muslim organizations altogether on a single platform. Through Milli Council, Qasmi played a key role in the removal of TADA and restored confidence of Muslim youth.

Qāsmi's religious and legal verdicts have been published as Fatawa Qadhi in Urdu by the Islamic Fiqh Academy.

He died of cancer on 4 April 2002.

== Literary works ==
Qasmi authored over 40 books which include:

- Al-Waqf
- Annizamul Qadai
- The Islamic Concept of Animal Slaughter
- Contemporary Medical Issues in Islamic Jurisprudence.

== Awards ==
Qasmi was conferred with following awards:

- Community Leadership Award from Al-Ameen Educational Trust
- 2nd Shah Waliullah Award from Institute of Objective Studies, New Delhi
- Abul Hasan Ali Nadwi Award from American Federation of Muslims of Indian Origin
- Best Islamic Personality Award from Muslim Educational Association of Southern India
- Fiqh Award from Executive Arbitration Committee, Government of Kuwait
- Gold Medal from the Cabinet of Morocco

== Legacy ==
Nomana Khalid wrote her M Phil thesis "Qadhi Mujahidul Islam Ki Fiqh-e-Islami Mein Khidmat" from Punjab University, Lahore.
