= Fazlur Rahim Mujaddidi =

Indian Islamic scholar (born 1957)

Maulana Mohammad Fazlur Rahim Mujaddidi
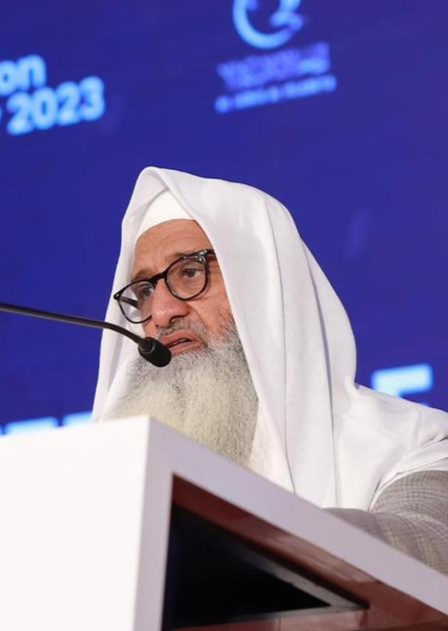

General Secretary of the All India Muslim Personal Law Board
- Incumbent
- Assumed office 3 June 2023
- Preceded by: Khalid Saifullah Rahmani

Rector of Jamea Tul Hidaya
- Incumbent
- Assumed office 1986
- Preceded by: Mohammad Abdur Rahim Mujaddidi

Personal life
- Born: 1957 (age 68–69) Jaipur, Rajasthan, India
- Parent: Mohammad Abdur Rahim Mujaddidi (father)
- Occupation: Islamic scholar, educator

Religious life
- Religion: Islam
- Denomination: Sunni
- Order: Naqshbandi (Mujaddidi)
- Jurisprudence: Hanafi
- Creed: Maturidi

Mohammad Fazlur Rahim Mujaddidi (born 1957) is an Indian Islamic scholar, educator, and the current General Secretary of the All India Muslim Personal Law Board (AIMPLB). He is the son and successor of Shah Mohammad Abdur Rahim Mujaddidi and is also associated with Jamea Tul Hidaya in Jaipur.

== Early life and background ==
Mohammad Fazlur Rahim Mujaddidi was born in 1957 into a family of Islamic scholars. His father, Shah Mohammad Abdur Rahim Mujaddidi, was a noted Sufi and educationist who laid the foundation of Jamea Tul Hidaya in Jaipur in 1976, with formal educational activities starting in 1986. The institution was envisioned as a madrasa incorporating modern and technical education alongside religious instruction.

== Career ==
Mujaddidi currently serves as the rector of Jamea Tul Hidaya and the chairman of the Abdul Rahim Educational Trust. He has also been involved in other educational initiatives such as the Imam Rabbani Group of Schools and has announced plans for the Imam Rabbani College.

Mujaddidi founded the Crescent Civil Services Academy in New Delhi under the aegis of the Maulana Abdur Rahim Educational Trust. The academy aims to support Muslim aspirants for India’s elite civil services such as the IAS, IFS, and IPS. Despite limited infrastructure, the academy has produced over 100 officers in various central and state services, including successful candidates in the 2012 examinations.

In June 2004, Mujaddidi participated in a three-day brainstorming session held in Jeddah, Saudi Arabia, organized by Indian NRIs under the theme "Working Together for the Development of Muslim Community in India." The event led to the conceptualization of the Indian Muslim Initiative (IMI), an NGO aimed at addressing the educational, economic, media, and social challenges faced by Indian Muslims. Mujaddidi was part of a group of educationists, media professionals, and community activists invited in recognition of their work, and the gathering emphasized long-term goals such as poverty alleviation, 80% literacy, media presence, and women's empowerment.

== Roles and affiliations ==
Mujaddidi was appointed as the General Secretary of the All India Muslim Personal Law Board (AIMPLB) on 3 June 2023, succeeding Khalid Saifullah Rahmani. He is also chairman of Strive for Eminence and Empowerment (SEE), an organization focused on educational and social upliftment.

In addition, he has previously been a member of the steering committee of the Planning Commission of India.

== Opposition to the Waqf Amendment Bill ==
As General Secretary of the All India Muslim Personal Law Board (AIMPLB), Mujaddidi has been a vocal critic of the Waqf (Amendment) Bill introduced by the central government. In November 2024, he stated that over 3.66 crore Muslims had submitted emails opposing the bill, arguing that the proposed amendments would weaken the autonomy of Waqf boards and facilitate the usurpation of Waqf properties. In March 2025, Mujaddidi and AIMPLB spokesperson Syed Qasim Rasool Ilyas jointly announced a protest at Jantar Mantar, calling the bill a "direct attack on Muslims." Despite large-scale opposition and representation from several Muslim organizations, the government moved forward with the bill. Mujaddidi accused the ruling NDA government of ignoring the community's concerns and adopting an authoritarian approach.

In late March 2025, Mujaddidi issued a public video appeal urging Muslims across India to wear black armbands on their right arms during the Jumu'atul-Wida (the last Friday of Ramadan) prayers as a symbolic protest against the bill. He encouraged participants to share visuals of their protest with the AIMPLB’s digital platform. Simultaneously, large sit-ins were organised in front of state assemblies in cities such as Patna and Vijayawada, while a "maha dharna" near the Bihar Legislative Assembly drew support from political parties and civil society groups. The AIMPLB’s 31-member Action Committee reiterated its commitment to resist the legislation through all legal, constitutional, and democratic means, calling the bill "controversial, discriminatory and damaging."

In April 2025, following the passage of the Waqf (Amendment) Act and the Mussalman Wakf (Repeal) Bill, the AIMPLB announced the launch of a nationwide protest campaign. Mujaddidi declared that the movement would include legal challenges in the Supreme Court of India, as well as peaceful demonstrations across major cities. The campaign’s first phase, titled "Save Waqf, Save the Constitution," was set to span a week and include symbolic arrests, submission of memoranda to government officials, and public gatherings in cities such as Delhi, Mumbai, Hyderabad, and Patna. The AIMPLB sharply criticised NDA allies like the Janata Dal (United), Telugu Desam Party, and Lok Janshakti Party (Ram Vilas) for supporting the bill, accusing them of endorsing what it described as a communal agenda. Mujaddidi reassured the Muslim community of continued resistance through democratic means.

== Views ==
Mujaddidi has advocated for the integration of traditional Islamic education with modern disciplines to equip students for contemporary challenges. He emphasizes employment-oriented education and has expressed concern over the socio-economic conditions of Muslims in India.

Mujaddidi strongly opposed the Waqf (Amendment) Bill 2025. He described the bill as "discriminatory, communally motivated and a blatant infringement on the constitutional rights of Muslim citizens." He stated that the management of Waqf has been taken away from Muslims and handed over to the government under the new provisions. Mujaddidi further said that despite over five crore emails being sent to oppose the bill, none of the objections were considered, and the amendments approved by the Joint Parliamentary Committee made the bill even more objectionable.

== Controversies ==
On 1 October 2024, Rajasthan cabinet minister Kirori Lal Meena accused Mujaddidi of illegally encroaching upon approximately 1,400 bighas of land on the outskirts of Jaipur. The alleged encroachment included Waqf properties, temple land, and plots belonging to the police department. Meena claimed that the land was used to establish the Islamic educational institution, Jamea Tul Hidaya, on Ramgarh Road. As of that time, no official investigation results or legal proceedings related to the allegations had been reported.
