= Islamic Fiqh Academy (India) =

Indian Deobandi fiqh organisation

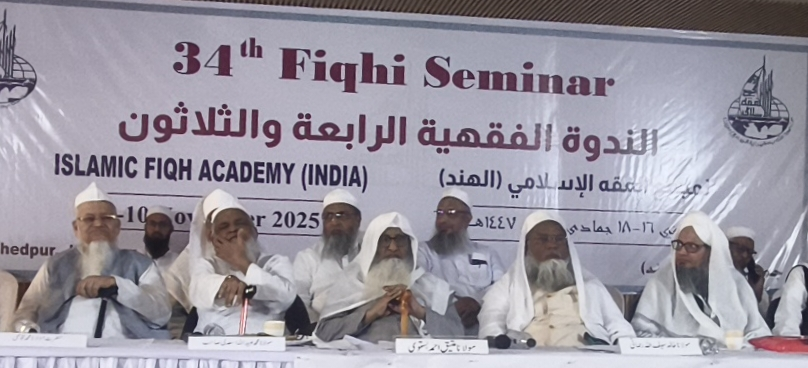
- Ateeque Ahmad Bastawi, Ubaidullah Asadi, Fazlur Rahim Mujaddidi, Khalid Saifullah Rahmani, and Abdullah Maroofi (from right to left) at the 34th Fiqhi Seminar of the Academy, held in Jamshedpur, Jharkhand, in 2025.
- Abbreviation: IFA
- Formation: 1988; 38 years ago
- Founder: Mujahidul Islam Qasmi
- Founded at: New Delhi
- Type: NGO
- Headquarters: 161 F Jogabai, Okhla Village Jamia Nagar, New Delhi - 110025 (India)
- Fields: Deobandi fiqh
- President: Nematullah Azami
- General secretary: Khalid Saifullah Rahmani
- Website: www.ifa-india.org

Islamic Fiqh Academy (India) (IFA) is a Fiqh (Islamic law) institute in New Delhi, established in 1989. It was registered as a charitable trust in 1990. Mujahidul Islam Qasmi was its founder and secretary general until his death. The academy is a registered NGO working as a research-oriented organization since then.

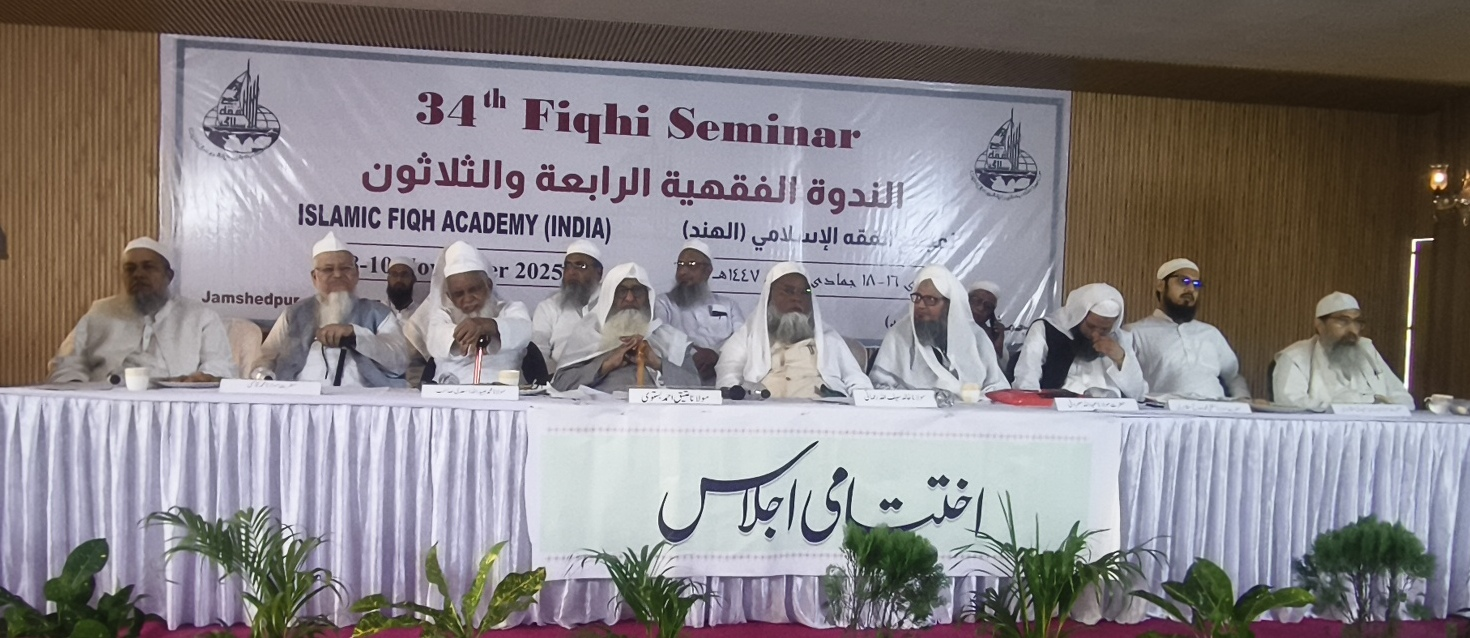
Anisur Rahman Qasmi, Ateeque Ahmad Bastawi, Ubaidullah Asadi, Fazlur Rahim Mujaddidi, Khalid Saifullah Rahmani, Abdullah Maroofi, Muhammad Salih Hasani Mazahiri, Muhammad Badran Saeedi, and Nazre Tauhid Qasmi (from right to left) at the 34th Fiqhi Seminar of the Academy, held in Jamshedpur, Jharkhand, in 2025.

== Services ==
It has issued statements on aspects of Islamic religious observance such as medical treatment during the Ramadan fast, and on sex education, mixed-sex education and organ donation. It has issued a number of published works, including an Urdu translation of the Encyclopedia of Islamic Jurisprudence. The Academy has been described as "the most recent and, in many ways, the most sophisticated articulation so far of claims to institutionalized Islamic authority in India".

== Membership ==
The membership includes a large number of young graduates (Fazils) from madrasas including Darul Uloom Deoband, Darul Uloom Nadwatul Ulama and Firangi Mahal in Lucknow. The academy coordinates with other academic and Fiqh institutions in the Middle East and in countries and areas with a significant Muslim minority population, such as the USA and Europe.

== See also ==
- List of Deobandi organisations
- Deobandi fiqh
