= Khalid Saifullah Rahmani =

Indian Muslim scholar and jurist

Mufti, Mawlāna Khalid Saifullah Rahmani
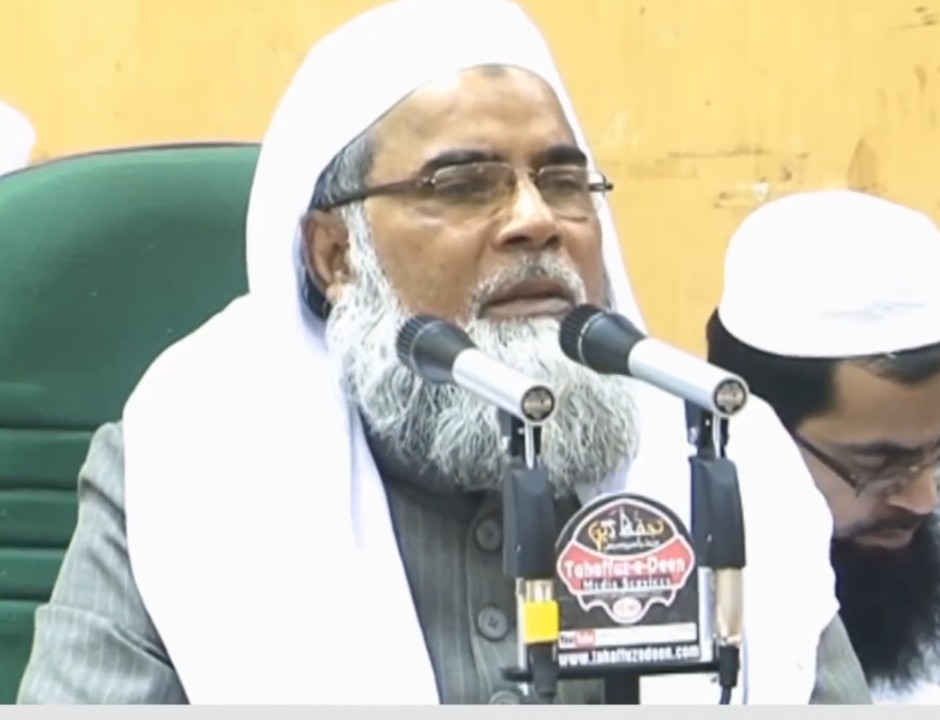
- Rahmani in 2018

President of All India Muslim Personal Law Board
- Incumbent
- Assumed office 3 June 2023
- Preceded by: Rabey Hasani Nadwi

General Secretary of All India Muslim Personal Law Board
- In office 2021–2023
- Preceded by: Wali Rahmani
- Succeeded by: Fazlur Rahim Mujaddidi

General Secretary of Islamic Fiqh Academy, India

Personal life
- Born: November 1956 (age 69) Darbhanga, Bihar, India
- Children: Omar Abedeen Qasmi Madani (son); Zafar Abedeen Nadwi (son)
- Main interest: Islamic Jurisprudence
- Notable work(s): Qamusul Fiqh, Contemporary jurisprudence
- Education: Jamia Rahmani Munger, Darul Uloom Deoband
- Relatives: Mujahidul Islam Qasmi (uncle)

Religious life
- Religion: Islam
- Founder of: Al Mahadul Aali Al Islami, Hyderabad
- Website: khalidrahmani.in

Khalid Saifullah Rahmani (born November 1956) is an Indian Muslim scholar, author and jurist who serves as the fifth president of the All India Muslim Personal Law Board. He is the general secretary of Islamic Fiqh Academy of India. He has authored books including The Islamic Jurisprudence: Introduction and Codification and Kitāb-ul-Fatāwa.

== Biography ==
Khalid Saifullah Rahmani was born in November 1956. He is the nephew of Islamic scholar and jurist, Mujahidul Islam Qasmi. He received his primary education at home and studied at Madrasa Qasimul Uloom Hussainia for two years. He graduated from Jamia Rahmani in Munger and studied "dawra-e-hadith" (the hadith class of Dars-e-Nizami) again at Darul Uloom Deoband, and graduated from there in 1395 AH. He later specialized in Islamic law and jurisprudence at Amarat-e-Sharia, Patna. His teachers include Sharif Hasan Deobandi, Mahmood Hasan Gangohi, Naseer Ahmad Khan, Nizamuddin Azami, Anzar Shah Kashmiri, and Muhammad Salim Qasmi. Rahmani also benefitted from his uncle Mujahidul Islam Qasmi.

In 1398 AH, Rahmani started to teach at Madrasa Sabeelus-Salam, where he was appointed head teacher in 1399 AH. He taught there for 22 years and went on to establish Al Mahadul Aali Al Islami, Hyderabad. He has also helped to found institutions such as Sabilul Falaah and Madrasa al-Falihat in Darbhanga; Madrasa Nurul Uloom, in Andhra Pradesh and Madrasa Talimul Quran lil-Banat in Karnataka.

Rahmani is a member of the All India Muslim Personal Law Board's Legal Council and the general secretary of Islamic Fiqh Academy. He is a regular columnist of the Friday edition of Munsif, and editor of Three Monthly Behs-o-Nazar, an Islamic juristic journal that Mujahidul Islam Qasmi had started. In 2021, he was appointed interim, and subsequently prominent, general secretary of the All India Muslim Personal Law Board following Wali Rahmani's death, after having served as a secretary of the Board. On 3 June 2023, he was elected as the fifth president of the All India Muslim Personal Law Board following the demise of Rabey Hasani Nadwi.

== Literary works ==
Rahmani's works include:

- Aasaan Tafsir-e-Quran Majid (A commentary on the Quran)
- Fiqh-e-Islāmi: Tadwīn-o-Ta'āruf (The Islamic Jurisprudence: Introduction and Codification)
- Islām ka Nizām Ushr-o-Zakāt
- Khawātīn ke Māli Huqūq: Shariat-e-Islāmi ki Nazar mai
- Kitāb al-Fatāwa (The Book of the Fatāwa)
- Qāmus al-Fiqh
- Qur'ān: Ek Ilhāmi Kitāb
- Asan Usul-e Hadith
- Prophet for the World (English translation of his Urdu book Paighambar-e-Aalam)

== See also ==
- Omar Abedeen Qasmi Madani
- Muhammad Azam Nadwi
