= Madrasa Hussainia, Kadru =

Islamic seminary in Ranchi

Coordinates: 23.3485°N 85.3110°E

- مدرسہ حسینیہ، کڈرو
- Established: 1958 April 29; 68 years ago
- Founders: Muhammad Azhar Nomani
- Religious affiliation: Islam
- Location: Hussainabad, Kadru, Ranchi, Jharkhand, India

Madrasa Hussainia, Kadru (Urdu: مدرسہ حسینیہ، کڈرو) is an Islamic seminary located in Kadru, Ranchi, in the Indian state of Jharkhand. It was established on 29 April 1958 by Muhammad Azhar Nomani, who served as its muhtamim (rector) until his death on 13 May 2017.

== History ==
Madrasa Hussainia founded by Muhammad Azhar Nomani in 1958 in the suburban area of Kadru, Ranchi, with the aim of promoting Islamic education among the local Muslim population.

The foundation of the madrasa was laid on 29 April 1958 on a small plot of land in Kadru. The institution began with a single student and gradually expanded through public donations. The madrasa began with three students initially enrolled.

Nomani remained the rector of the institution until his death on 13 May 2017. After his death, the madrasa's governing council (Majlis-e-Shura) appointed his son, Maulana Muhammad, who had been serving as deputy rector since 1996, as muhtamim (rector).

== Campus and facilities ==
The madrasa campus covers approximately 4.5 acres. It includes academic buildings, administrative offices, hostels, and the Madani Mosque located within the premises.

Three hostels—Saikhul Islam Manzil, Mahmood Manzil, and Rashid Manzil—accommodate students. The Madani Mosque within the campus is used for daily and Friday congregational prayers.

== Academics ==
The madrasa provides instruction in Islamic studies, including Qur’anic recitation (qira'at) and memorization (hifz), as well as Arabic, Persian, and Urdu. Additional subjects such as English, Hindi, mathematics, and computer studies are also taught.

As of 2019, approximately 1,000 students were enrolled at the madrasa, including students from Jharkhand, Bihar, Odisha, Chhattisgarh, and West Bengal. The madrasa provides education without charging fees.

In February 2025, the madrasa organized its 32nd Jalsa-e-Dastarbandi, during which 849 students participated in a graduation ceremony.

== Administration and funding ==
The madrasa is administered under the guidance of a Majlis-e-Shura (governing council). Its expenses are met through public donations.

== Events ==
In April 2024, an Eid Milan gathering was organized at the madrasa premises under the leadership of its muhtamim.

== See also ==
- Muhammad Azhar Nomani

== Bibliography ==
- Alam, Suhaib (2024-04-01). Dalīl al-mu'assasāt al-mu'niyah bi-al-lughah al-'Arabiyyah fī al-Hind [A Guide to Institutions Concerned with the Arabic Language in India] (in Arabic). King Salman Global Academy for Arabic Language. pp. 280–281. ISBN 978-603-8444-25-2.
- Qaiser, Azhar Shah, ed. (1982). "About Madrasa Hussainia, Kadru". Monthly Darul Uloom (in Urdu). 62: 18 – via Google Books.
