= Damla, Bihar =

Damla is a large village located on the bank of the Kamla River in Bisfi of Madhubani district, Bihar, India. As of the 2011 Census of India, it had 4,093 residents in 806 households.
