= Encyclopedia of Islamic Jurisprudence =

- Author: Department of Islamic Research and Encyclopedias
- Original title: الموسوعة الفقهية الكويتية (Al Mausu'ah Al Fiqhiyah Al Kuwaitiyah)
- Language: Arabic
- Subject: Encompasses the Jurisprudence of all four major Islamic schools of thought.
- Genre: Islamic Jurisprudence (Fiqh)
- Publisher: Kuwait Ministry of Awqaf and Islamic Affairs, Darut Tawfikiya Lit Turas, Egypt.
- Publication date: 2012
- Publication place: Kuwait
- Media type: Print & Digital
- Pages: 45 Volumes (18,500 pages)
- Website: http://islam.gov.kw/Pages/en/

Encyclopedia of Islamic Jurisprudence (in Arabic: الموسوعة الفقهیة) is the biggest encyclopedia authored and published in Arabic language by the Kuwait Ministry of Islamic Affairs.

== Overview ==
The project was officially initiated in 1965 and a wide number of Islamic scholars contributed through its completion in 2005 (in approximately 40 years). The Encyclopedia of Islamic Jurisprudence (Mausua Fiqhiya Kuwaitiya) was prepared in alphabetical order and published in 45 volumes reaching about 17,650 pages. It encompasses the Fiqh (Islamic Jurisprudence) of all four major Islamic schools of thought.

Ministry's Department of Islamic Research and Encyclopedias also provide this work as a C.D & mobile Apps.

== Translation works ==
The Encyclopedia of Islamic Jurisprudence (Mausua Fiqhiya Kuwaitiya) was translated from Arabic into Urdu by Islamic Fiqh Academy, India and the book was published in 45 volumes by Genuine Publications and Media, India in 2009.

Currently, Encyclopedia of Islamic Jurisprudence (Mausua Fiqhiya Kuwaitiya) is being translated into Persian in Iran and Malay in Malaysia.
