= Kuwait Ministry of Awqaf and Islamic Affairs =

Government ministry of Kuwait

Ministry of Awqaf and Islamic Affairs
- وزارة الأوقاف والشؤون الإسلامية

Agency overview
- Jurisdiction: Government of Kuwait
- Headquarters: Kuwait City
- Minister responsible: Mohammad I. M. Al-Wasmi, Minister of Awqaf and Islamic Affairs
- Agency executive: Bader Al-Mutairi, Undersecretary
- Website: www.awqaf.gov.kw/en

The Ministry of Awqaf and Islamic Affairs (MOAIA; Arabic: Arabic: وزارة الأوقاف والشؤون الإسلامية) is the cabinet-level body responsible for religious affairs and Islamic endowments (awqāf) in the State of Kuwait. Its remit includes oversight of mosques and religious activities, issuance of fatwas, management of the official Hajj program for citizens and residents, and policy initiatives promoting religious moderation.

== Responsibilities ==
- Mosques and worship: regulation and administration of mosques and related services. In 2025 the ministry issued a circular requiring prior approval for installing surveillance cameras in mosques and placing systems under ministry supervision.
- Fatwa services: operation of official e-services to submit questions for religious opinions.
- Hajj administration: organizing and supervising Hajj affairs for Kuwaiti pilgrims through the national Hajj mission.
- Moon-sighting (Islamic holidays): the ministry’s Moon Sighting Committee announces the beginning of Ramadan and Eid al-Fitr.
- Promotion of moderation and counter-extremism programs, including through the Center for the Promotion of Moderation (also known as the Moderation Center).
- Religious outreach: the Islam Presentation Committee (IPC) conducts proselytization/outreach under the authority of the ministry.

== Affiliated and related bodies ==
- Kuwait Zakat House – a public entity under the ministry that collects and disburses zakat, established by Law No. 5/1982.
- Kuwait Center for the Promotion of Moderation – a MOAIA unit that runs programs on tolerance and countering extremism.
- Kuwait Awqaf Public Foundation (KAPF) – an independent public foundation established by Amiri Decree No. 257/1993 to manage awqaf assets; it works in the endowments sector alongside the ministry.

== Ministers ==
- Yusuf Al-Hadji, 1970s.
- Yaacoub Abdulmohsen Al-Sanaa, 2015.
- Mohammad Nasser Al-Jabri, 10 December 2016 – 30 October 2017. (Note: Primary confirmation appears in KUNA’s contemporaneous cabinet profiles.)
- Fahad Mohammad Al-Afasi, 11 December 2017 – December 2018; again December 2019 – December 2020.
- Fahad Al-Shula, December 2018 – December 2019.
- Essa (Issa) Al-Kandari, 14 December 2020 – 1 August 2022.
- Abdulaziz Majid Al-Majid (Minister of Justice and Minister of Awqaf and Islamic Affairs), 16 October 2022 – 26 January 2023.
- Abdulrahman Al-Mutairi (concurrent portfolio), 2023.
- Mohammad I. M. Al-Wasmi, 13 May 2024 – present.

== See also ==
- Religion in Kuwait
- Awqaf
