= Monowar Hussain =

Indian politician

MLA of Goalpara East Vidhan Sabha Constituency
- In office 2011–2016
- Preceded by: Dulal Chandra Ghosh
- Succeeded by: Abul Kalam Rasheed Alam

Personal details
- Party: Indian National Congress

Monowar Hussain is an Indian politician from the state of Assam. In 2011 he was elected as MLA of Goalpara East Vidhan Sabha Constituency in Assam Legislative Assembly. He was an All India United Democratic Front candidate. He joined Indian National Congress in 2016.
