= Karaan =

Karaan can refer to:

- Karaan (deity), a minor deity in the Dungeons & Dragons fictional universe
- Taha Karaan (1969–2021), South African Islamic scholar
- Yusuf Karaan (1935–2015), South African Islamic scholar
