= Shaukat Thanvi =

Short story and novel writer (1904-1963)

- Born: 2 February 1904; Vrindavan, Mathura district, United Provinces of Agra and Oudh, British India
- Died: 4 May 1963 (aged 59); Lahore, West Pakistan, Pakistan
- Resting place: Miani Sahib Graveyard, Lahore, Pakistan
- Occupations: Journalist, essayist, columnist, novelist, short story writer, broadcaster, playwright, humorist and poet
- Writing career
- Notable works: Sheesh Mahal, Sudeshi Rail
- Notable awards: Tamgha-e-Imtiaz (Medal of Excellence) Award from the President of Pakistan (1963)

Shaukat Thanvi (2 February 1904 – 4 May 1963) was a Pakistani writer and humorist. His real name was Muhammad Umer.

== Early life ==
Shaukat Thanvi was born in Vrindavan, Mathura district, Uttar Pradesh, British India, on 2 February 1904. Thana Bhawan, a small town in Muzaffarnagar district (now in Shamli district) of Uttar Pradesh, was Thanvi's ancestral hometown and possibly the source of his last name, though Professor Mushtaq Azmi suggests that he adopted the name Thanvi because of his affection for the Islamic scholar Maulana Ashraf Ali Thanwi.

== Career ==
Shaukat Thanvi had little formal schooling. Starting in 1928, he worked for an Urdu-language newspaper Hamdam published from Lucknow, British India and continued working for several other Urdu newspapers. Then he joined the radio station in Lucknow as a writer and broadcaster after it was first established in 1938. He was doing mainly humorous talk shows at the radio station and quit journalism to focus on that.

At the suggestion of veteran novelist Syed Imtiaz Ali Taj, Thanvi joined Lahore's Pancholi Art Pictures as a story and songwriter in 1943. After the creation of Pakistan in 1947, Pancholi Art Pictures closed down and Shaukat Thanvi joined Radio Pakistan in Lahore. In 1957, Shaukat Thanvi joined the Daily Jang newspaper and started writing a humor column in it called "Vaghaira Vaghaira" (lit. "etc., etc."), which later became very popular among the Pakistani public.

== Marriage ==
Thanvi was married twice, first to Saeeda Khatoon and later to Zohra Begum.

== Literary works ==
Thanvi wrote poetry while publishing more than sixty books.

His notable works include:

- Sheesh Mahal:شیش محل
- Saudeshi Rail (Native Train)

== Awards and recognition ==
- Shaukat Thanvi received the Tamgha-e-Imtiaz (Medal of Excellence) Award on 23 March 1963 from the President of Pakistan.

== Death ==
Following his death on 4 May 1963, Thanvi's burial took place at Miani Sahib Graveyard, Lahore, which is located in front of Radio Pakistan.
