= Hakeem Muhammad Akhtar =

Pakistani Muslim scholar

Aarif Billah, Mawlāna Hakeem Muḥammad Akhtar
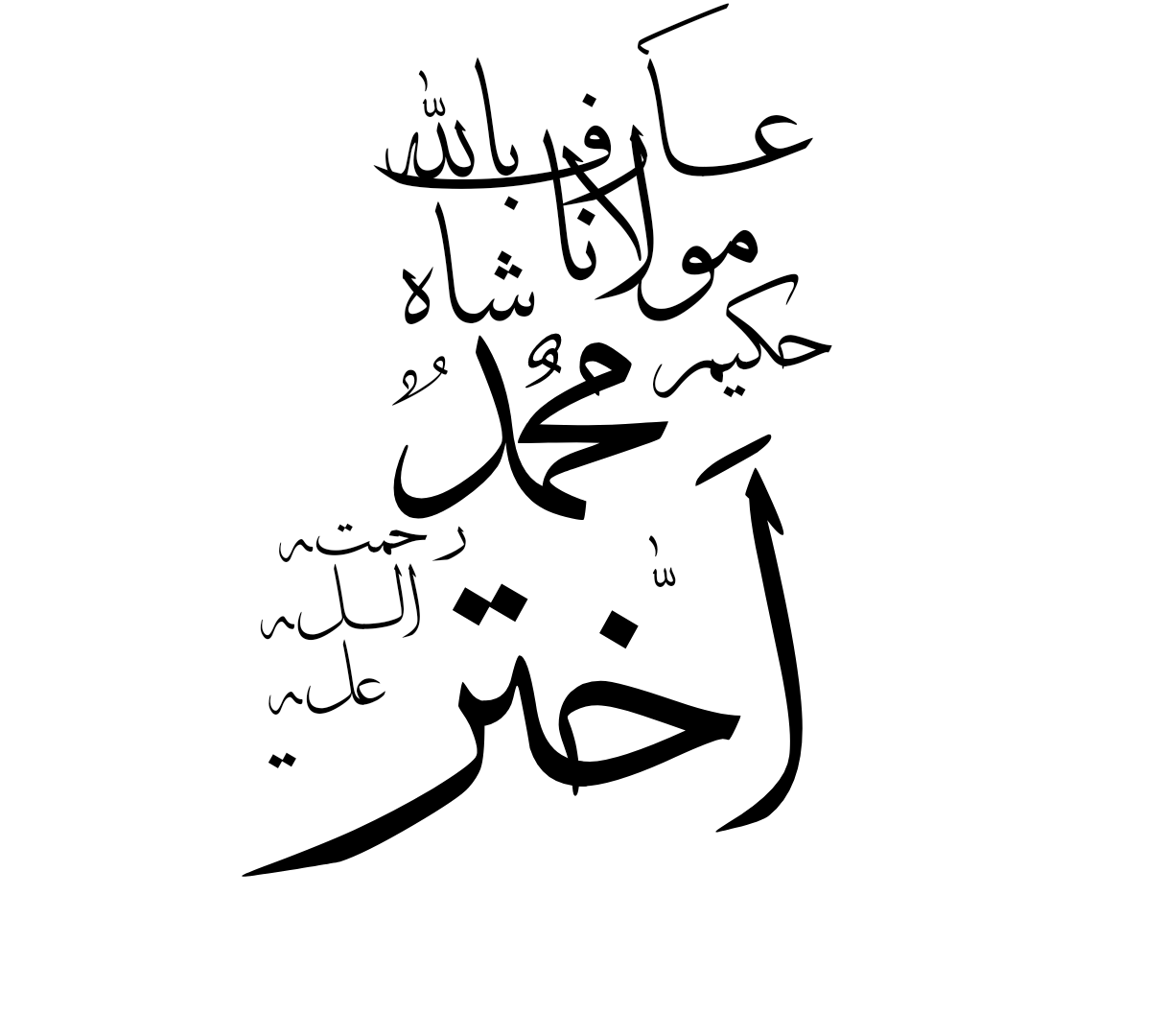

Personal life
- Born: 1928 Pratapgarh, British India
- Died: 2 June 2013 (aged 84–85) Karachi, Pakistan
- Notable work(s): Ma'ārif-e-Masnawi, Faizān-e-Muḥabbat
- Education: State Unani Medical College Allahabad, Madrasa Bait-ul-Uloom

Religious life
- Religion: Islam
- Founder of: Jamiah Ashraful Madāris

Muslim leader
- Disciple of: Muhammad Ahmad Pratapgarhi; Abdul Ghani Phoolpuri; Abrarul Haq Haqqi

Hakeem Muhammad Akhtar (1928 – 2 June 2013) was a Pakistani Sunni Muslim scholar, poet, philanthropist and a Sufi mentor. He established the Jamiah Ashraful Madāris in Karachi. He was an alumnus of the State Unani Medical College Allahabad and the Madrasa Bait-ul-Uloom, Sarai Mir. He was an authorized disciple of Abrarul Haq Haqqi. His works include Ma'ārif-e-Masnawi and Faizān-e-Muḥabbat.

== Biography ==
Hakeem Muhammad Akhtar was born in 1928 in Pratapgarh. He was schooled in Pratapgarh and studied Persian with Qāri Muḥammad Siddīq in Sultanpur.He graduated from the State Unani Medical College Allahabad in 1944 where his teacher was Hakim Aḥmad Usmāni, the father of Hakim Hammad Usmani. He was inclined towards studying Islamic sciences, and completed the traditional dars-e-nizami at the Madrasa Bait-ul-Uloom in Sarai Mir in four years.

Akhtar studied the Sihah Sittah with Abdul Ghani Phulpuri, a student of Majid Ali Jaunpuri. He developed interest in Sufism in early days and benefitted from Abdul Ghani Phulpuri, Abrarul Haq Haqqi and Muhammad Ahmad Pratapgarhi. Haqqi authorized him in the Ashrafia, Chistiyyah, Naqshbandiyah, Qadiriyyah and the Suhrawardiyya orders of Sufism.

Akhtar migrated to Pakistan in 1960 with his Sufi mentor Abdul Ghani Phulpuri. In 1980, he started the "Khanqāh Imdādiya Ashrafiya" in Karachi at the wishes of Abrarul Haq Haqqi. His disciples have started branches of it in Bangladesh, India, Kenya, Mauritius, Myanmar, Réunion, South Africa and Turkey.Akhtar established the Jamiah Ashraful Madāris, a famous seminary in Gulistan-e-Johar, Karachi, in 1998.

Akhtar died on 2 June 2013 in Karachi. His funeral prayer was led by his son Hakeem Muḥammad Mazhar and attended by scholars including Abdul Ghafoor Haideri, Aurangzaib Farooqi, Mufti Muhammad Naeem, Rafi Usmani, Saleemullah Khan and Zar Wali Khan. His disciples in Sufism include Abdul Hamid Ishaq, Fazlur Rahman Azmi, Mufti Zubair Dudha, Muhammad Ilyas Ghuman, Salman Nadvi, Moulana Yunus Patel and Mufti Zubair Bayat.

== Literary works ==
Akhtar's works include:

- Ma'ārif-e-Masnawi, a commentary on the Masnavi of Rumi. This major work of Akhtar is hailed by Islamic scholars such as Yousuf Banuri, Zakariyya Kandhlawi and Manzoor Nomani. It was rendered in English by the South African scholar Yusuf Karaan.
- Lessons on the Mathnawi of Moulana Rumi: on love and recognition
- Tajalliat-E-Jazb: manifestation of Allah's attraction
- Ma'rifat-e-Ilāhiya
- Rūh ki bīmāriyān aur unka ilāj
- Faizān-e-Muḥabbat

== See also ==
- List of Deobandis

== Bibliography ==
- Khan, Waleed (2021). "An Introductory Review of the Remarkable Books and Exhortations of Molana Hakim Akhtar R.A (Silsla e Akhtaria)". Rahat-ul-Quloob (in Urdu). 5 (1): 87–94. doi:10.51411/rahat.5.1.2021/143. ISSN 2521-2869. S2CID 242123984.
- Khaliq Dad (January–June 2019). "Maulana Shah Hakeem Muhammad Akhtar: Hayāt-o-Khidmāt" [Life and services of Maulana Shah Hakeem Muhammad Akhtar]. Rāhatul Qulūb. 3 (1): 28–41. Archived from the original on 16 May 2021.
- Sayyid Ishrat Jameel Mir. Rashk-e-Awliya, Hayat-e-Akhtar (in Urdu) (September 2017 ed.). Gulistan-e-Johar: Idara Taleefat-e-Akhtaria.
