= Halal pork scandal of South Africa =

The Halal pork scandal of South Africa was a scandal that broke out in South Africa in 2011 where a leading meat importer labelled pork as halal. The importer was also accused of relabelling kangaroo meat from Australia and water buffalo meat from India as halal even though South Africa's halal certification authority, the Muslim Judicial Council (MJC) had not approved these. The accused company, Cape Town based importer, Orion Cold Storage said it was the victim of a smear campaign by its rival businesses. The MJC suspended its dealings with Orion Cold Storage and the accusing Muslim companies obtained a court order banning Orion from using the halal label. The South African Halaal Authority Trust, the Red Meat Industry Forum of South Africa and the South African Meat Industry Company filed an interdict application against Orion, to stop the company from distributing meat.

On its part, Orion charged two rival businesses with sabotage, blackmail and extortion. While acknowledging that some pork had been labelled as halal, it alleged that some of its employees had been paid by rivals to switch products and labels before loading onto trucks.

== Aftermath ==
The scandal caused an uproar among South African Muslims as Muslims are prohibited from consuming pork and for any other meat to be certified as halal, it must be slaughtered as per the halal way. Leader of a Muslim organization Al Jama-ah said "What has aggravated many Muslims is that Orion employees have joked that they have fed Muslims with pork for many years. I am very concerned Muslims will take the law into their own hands." He further said that a fatwa had been issued to punish senior MJC members and captains in the Muslim meat industry for "being complicit in selling pork to Muslims".

The Muslim Judicial Council of South Africa lost reputation and members of the South African Muslim community called for it to be scrapped.
