= Wasiullah Fatehpuri =

Indian Islamic scholar and Sufi (c. 1895–1967)

- Fatehpuri seated among disciples

Personal life
- Born: c. 1895 Tal Naraja, Fatehpur, Azamgarh district (now Mau district), North-Western Provinces, British India
- Died: 25 November 1967 (aged 71–72) At sea (en route from Bombay to Mecca)
- Cause of death: Cerebral haemorrhage
- Resting place: Burial at sea
- Education: Darul Uloom Deoband
- Known for: Deobandi scholarship and Sufi training
- Occupation: Islamic scholar, Sufi, teacher, writer

Religious life
- Religion: Islam
- Denomination: Sunni
- Jurisprudence: Hanafi
- Tariqa: Chishti
- Creed: Deobandi

Muslim leader
- Teacher: Ashraf Ali Thanwi

Wasiullah Fatehpuri (c. 1895–1967), also known as Shah Wasiullah, Wasiullah Azmi and Wasiullah Illahabadi, was an Indian Islamic scholar, Sufi, teacher, and writer. He was an authorised disciple of Ashraf Ali Thanwi in Sufism and was associated with the Deobandi scholarly tradition.

== Early life and education ==
Wasiullah Fatehpuri was born in c. 1895 (1312 AH) in Tal Naraja, Fatehpur, Azamgarh district (now Mau district).

He received his early and elementary education, including memorisation of the Qur'an, in his native place. Thereafter, he pursued further studies in Kanpur at Madrasa Ashraful Uloom and Madrasa Jamiul Uloom, where he studied introductory Persian and Arabic texts.

In 1328 AH, he enrolled at Darul Uloom Deoband, beginning his studies with texts such as Mukhtasr al-Quduri and al-Kafiya. He completed his education there in 1335 AH (1917 CE).

His teachers at the Deoband seminary included Anwar Shah Kashmiri, Shabbir Ahmad Usmani, Murtaza Hasan Chandpuri, Ibrahim Balyawi, Izaz Ali Amrohi, Ghulam Rasool Hazarvi, and Azizur Rahman Usmani.

His fellow students included Muhammad Shafi Deobandi and Muhammad Tayyib Qasmi.

== Spiritual life ==
During his student years at Deoband, Fatehpuri entered into a spiritual pledge (bay'ah) at a young age with Mahmud Hasan Deobandi. Shortly thereafter, Deobandi was imprisoned in Malta, following which Fatehpuri developed a close spiritual association with Ashraf Ali Thanwi and subsequently pledged allegiance to him. This led to his regular visits to the khanqah at Thana Bhawan.

After completing his formal education, he stayed at Thana Bhawan with Thanvi for the purpose of further intellectual and spiritual training. Following his graduation, he devoted himself fully to the khanqah at Thana Bhawan and completed his spiritual training under Thanwi. He was later granted permission for bay'ah and khilafah by Thanwi.

== Career ==
During his stay at Thana Bhawan, Fatehpuri also taught at the madrasa attached to the khanqah. While residing in Phulpur, Azamgarh with Shah Abdul Ghani Phulpuri, he likewise engaged in regular teaching activities. Beginning in 1342 AH, he served for approximately five years as a teacher at Ihyaul Uloom, Mubarakpur.

He then spent two years residing with his spiritual mentor at Thana Bhawan. After his marriage, he settled in his native town of Fatehpur. In Safar 1345 AH, he returned to Ihyaul Uloom, Mubarakpur, where he remained until Rajab of the same year.

Following his period in Mubarakpur, he stayed for some time in Kanpur, where he was also involved in teaching. He later returned to Thana Bhawan with his mentor, who assigned him responsibilities of teaching at Madrasa Imdadul Uloom, Thana Bhawan, and serving as the imam of the khanqah mosque.

In 1351 AH, he returned permanently to his native region and became engaged in teaching, training, and community guidance. Initially, his activities remained limited to his hometown and surrounding areas. He continued teaching there, and among his students was his son-in-law Qamaruzzaman Allahabadi.

Due to local political and social tensions, Fatehpuri left his hometown in 1375 AH (1956) and relocated to Gorakhpur, where he remained until November 1957. In 1377 AH (1957), he chose to settle in Allahabad instead of Gorakhpur. There, he established a khanqah and continued work related to spiritual instruction in accordance with the methods of his mentors. He also founded a madrasa known as Madrasa Wasiyatul Uloom.

In 1961, he returned temporarily to Fatehpur, after which he went back to Allahabad. In February 1965, he stayed in Aligarh for one week. Later that year, he spent approximately one month in Lucknow for medical treatment and subsequently remained in Bombay (Mumbai) for two to three months. Until his death, he continued to travel periodically from Allahabad to Bombay, where he also engaged in spiritual guidance.

His notable authorised disciples in Sufism include Muhammad Mubeen Allahabadi, Ibrahim Balyawi, Zahoorul Hasan Thanwi, Muhammad Ishaq Sandelvi, Muhammad Hanif Jaunpuri, Nizamuddin Azami, Abdul Halim Faizabadi, Salahuddin Allahabadi, Hakim Masood Ajmeri, Qamaruzzaman Allahabadi, and Irshad Ahmad Faizabadi.

== Literary works ==
Fatehpuri authored more than fifty works of varying length. His writings, including treatises and letters, were later compiled and published under the title Majmū'a-yi Ta'līfāt-i Muṣliḥ al-Ummah, issued in four volumes and comprising forty-eight works.

In addition to this collected edition, several of his works were published separately. Notable titles include:

- al-Ifādāt al-Waṣiyyah
- Waṣiyyat al-Akhlāq
- Waṣiyyat al-Iḥsān
- Waṣiyyat al-Sālikīn
- Taṣawwuf wa Nisbat al-Ṣūfiyyah
- Ta'līm wa Tarbiyat-i Awlād
- al-Tadhkīr bi’l-Qur'ān
- ʿIlm kī Ḍarūrat
- Tawqīr al-'Ulamā
- Taḥdhīr al-'Ulamā
- Dībācha-yi Ma'rifat
- Gulistān-i Ma'rifat

== Death ==
In the later years of his life, on 11 Shaban 1387 AH, he departed from Bombay aboard the S.S. Mozaffari along with his disciples for the pilgrimage to Mecca. During the journey, on 22 Shaban 1387 AH, he suffered a severe hypertensive episode resulting in a cerebral haemorrhage, which led to his death while at sea. He died on 25 November 1967 at the age of 75.

Permission had been granted by the Saudi authorities for his burial at Jannat al-Mu'alla; however, due to the non-receipt of the necessary telegram, funeral rites were performed aboard the ship and his body was consigned to the sea, traditionally identified in contemporary accounts as the Red Sea.
