= Aziz al-Hasan Ghouri =

Indian Islamic scholar and poet

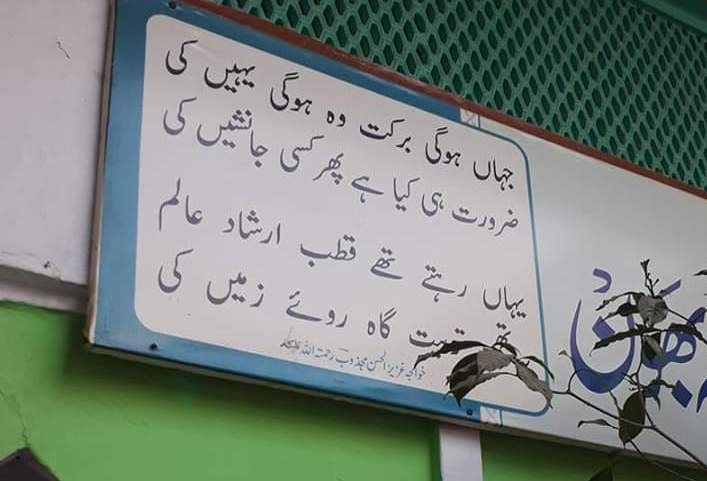
- Couplets of Aziz al-Hasan Ghouri hanging in the khanqah of Thana Bhawan
- Title: Khan Sahib, Khan Bahadur

Personal life
- Born: 12 June 1884 Orai, British India
- Died: 17 August 1944 (aged 60)
- Parent: Khwaja Azizullah Ghori (father)

Religious life
- Religion: Islam

Muslim leader
- Disciple of: Ashraf Ali Thanwi

Aziz al-Hasan Ghouri (also known as Aziz al-Hasan Majzoob or Khwaja Aziz al-Hasan; 12 June 1884 – 17 August 1944) was an Indian Islamic scholar, poet and the primary biographer of Ashraf Ali Thanwi. He was an alumnus of Muhammadan Anglo-Oriental College and an authorized disciple of Ashraf Ali Thanwi in Sufism.

Ghouri held the titles of Khan Sahib and Khan Bahadur. His couplet Har Tamanna Dil Se Rukhsat Hogayi has been deemed to be one of the 100 most popular Urdu couplets. Thanwi commended it saying that if he had one hundred thousand rupees, he would give it to Ghouri.

== Biography ==
Aziz al-Hasan Ghouri was born on 12 June 1884 in Orai. He got a BA and an LLB from Muhammadan Anglo-Oriental College, now Aligarh Muslim University. He was a disciple of Ashraf Ali Thanwi.

Ghouri worked as deputy collector for 7 years and later joined the Department of Education. He was the Deputy Inspector for Islamic madrassas and then became the Inspector of the English schools in Lucknow, United Provinces of British India and retired only from this post. He was honored with titles of Khan Sahib and Khan Bahadur by the Government of British India. He was a poet and wrote in the ghazal, nazm, hamd and naat genre of Urdu poetry. He firstly used "Hasan" and then "Majzoob" as his poetic name. His poetic collection Kashkol-e-Majzoob was published in 1950. His poem "Dars-e-Ibrat", "Jagah Ji Lagane Ki Dunya Nahi Hai" was released by Junaid Jamshed in his Jalwa-e-Janan album. Ashraf Ali Thanwi commended one couplet from Ghouri's poem Har Tamanna Dil Se Rukhsat Hogayi and said that if he had one hundred thousand rupees, he would give it to Ghouri. This couplet has been deemed to be one of the 100 most popular Urdu couplets.

Ghouri died on 17 August 1944. According to John Mohammed Butt, "No one enshrines the life and mission of Ashraf Ali Thanwi more than Majzub. Not only did he write beautiful poetry about his time with Thanwi, he also provided proof that a free spirit could flourish in the highly disciplined and austere environment of Thanwi khānqah."

== Literary works ==
Literary works of Ghouri include:

- Kashkol-e-Majzoob
- Ashrafus-Sawaneh, biography of Ashraf Ali Thanwi.
- Kalam-e-Majzoob
- PhooloN ki dali
- Sada-e-Majzoob
- Deewan-e-Majzoob
- Nafeer-e-Ghaib

== Bibliography ==
- Nadwi, Sayyid Sulaimān (2003). "Khwājah Azīz al-Hasan Ghouri Majzūb". Yād-e-Raftgān (in Urdu). Karachi: Majlis Nashriyāt-e-Islām. pp. 301–314.
