= Political views of Ashraf Ali Thanwi =

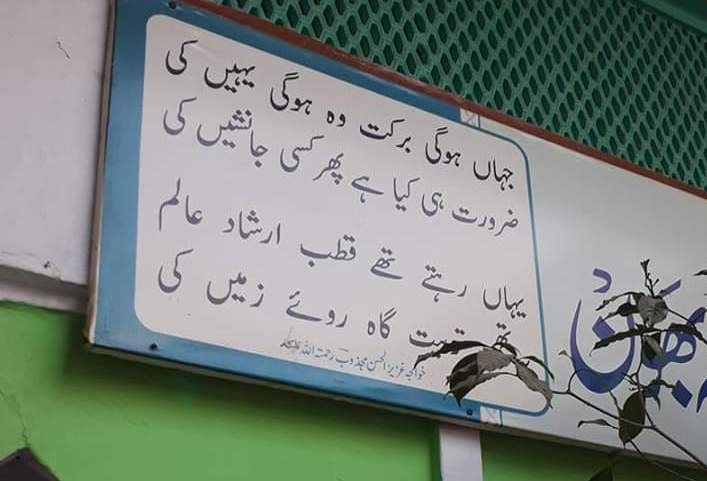
Khanqah of Ashraf Ali Thanwi, where he resided until the end of his life.

Ashraf Ali Thanwi, also known as Ḥakīm al-Ummat (1863 – 1943), played a central role in the Islamic religious, spiritual, and intellectual landscape of late 19th and 20th century South Asia, and his influence still resonates today. While his primary focus was on religious and spiritual matters, he also expressed some political views. He believed that politics should be considered an integral part of religion and categorically dismissed both secularist and political interpretations of Islam. In his view, the sole purpose of politics is to serve the greater objectives of religion, which entail establishing a connection between believers and God, and thus, religious norms must never be subordinated to political ends. He remained skeptical of democracy, considering it a Western import that did not necessarily align with Islamic principles. He emphasized the significance of reinstating the Islamic concept of the caliphate, which functions as a system of Islamic governance based on the principles of Islam, but he did not devise any specific model for it. He opposed the Khilafat Movement due to its non-compliance with Sharia and was against the Indian National Congress. Therefore, he resigned from the management committee of Darul Uloom Deoband due to its pro-Congress stance. As a primary supporter of a separate homeland for Muslims, popularly known as the Pakistan Movement, he firmly backed the Muslim League and sought to transform it into an army of Allah through his guidance. He was recognized when he was invited as a guest to the 30th Session of All-India Muslim League, held on 24–26 April 1943 in Delhi. After his death, his disciples established the Jamiat Ulema-e-Islam to support the creation of Pakistan, with Zafar Ahmad Usmani and Shabbir Ahmad Usmani being the key players in religious support for the movement.

== Islam and Politics ==
As per Ashraf Ali Thanwi, the secularist perspective of there being no correlation between politics and Islam is erroneous. Nonetheless, it is also not entirely precise to assert that the paramount purpose of human existence is to establish politics and the state in Islam. Thanwi substantiates his argument by citing Quranic verse 22:41, which reads: "They are those who, if established in the land by Us, would perform prayer, pay alms-tax, encourage what is good, and forbid what is evil. And with Allah rests the outcome of all affairs." Thanwi elucidates that this verse unequivocally indicates that the primary objective of Islam is piety and religion, not politics or jihad. Rather, politics and jihad serve as means and conduits to foster piety and religion. Therefore, while all prophets and messengers were dispatched to institute religion and its precepts, not all were bestowed with the responsibility of jihad and politics. Rather, the allocation of these duties is contingent upon their necessity, depending on the available resources and means.

Verse 24:55 of the Quran avers, "Allah hath promised such of you as believe and do good works that He will surely make them to succeed (the present rulers) in the earth even as He caused those who were before them to succeed (others); and that He will surely establish for them their religion which He hath approved for them, and will give them in exchange safety after their fear. They serve Me. They ascribe no thing as partner unto Me. Those who disbelieve henceforth, they are the miscreants." Islamist interpreters construe this verse as a warrant for politics and the establishment of a state as the fundamental objective of Islam. Their explication indicates that faith and good deeds are prerequisites for establishing governance, as stipulated in this verse. This denotes that politics and governance are the prime goals of Islam. In response, Ashraf Ali Thanwi posits that this verse actually pledges governance and power as a reward for faith and good works. It is contended that the hallmark of religion is that when Muslims become adherents of the complete religion, power will inevitably be conferred upon them, and they shall ascend to the seat of power. Therefore, it can be inferred that the promise of establishing a state is predicated on the practice of religion. In Quranic verse 5:66, it is asserted, "If only they had observed the Torah and the Gospel and that which was revealed unto them from their Lord, they would surely have been nourished from above and from beneath their feet. Among them there are people who are moderate, but many of them are of evil conduct." This verse guarantees abundant sustenance as a remuneration for the practice of religion, including the adherence to the Torah, the Gospel, and the Quran. Nonetheless, this does not entail that the primary purpose of religion is sustenance or wealth. The verse underscores that a religious person is never left deprived of sustenance and raiment. It is demonstrated in the Qur'an, in verse 24:55, that power, strength, and authority are promised in exchange for faith and good deeds. Therefore, this must be perceived as a characteristic of faith and good deeds, and not as the ultimate objective.

Ashraf Ali Thanwi firmly rejected the notion that democracy is taught by Islam or is aligned with Islamic teachings. He raised concerns about democracy and its negative aspects based on his religious beliefs. Thanwi pointed out that a problem exists in modern times where people blindly accept popular opinions without question. He questioned whether this opinion is being influenced by ignorant masses and emphasized the limitations of following the majority opinion. Thanwi argued that the majority of people are often uneducated or lack knowledge, making them unfit to be the standard of truth. To illustrate his point, he cited examples from the Quran and Hadith. Thanwi demonstrated that the majority's opinion is not always the truth by presenting examples from history. He gave an account of the Battle of Uhud where fifty companions were appointed on a hill, and the majority believed they should leave the hill, while a few believed they should stay put. The majority's opinion proved to be incorrect, and the minority's opinion was correct. Thanwi also cited Abu Bakr's approach to governance as evidence that the majority opinion is not necessarily true. After Prophet Muhammad's death, when some tribes refused to pay Zakat (alms) to the new Islamic state, Abu Bakr resolved to wage war against them, while Umar and most other companions disagreed. Abu Bakr remained steadfast in his decision, and later, everyone accepted his decision as true.

== Khilafat Movement ==
The Khilafat movement was launched in the early 20th century with the aim of supporting the Ottoman Empire and preserving the Khalifa's role as the leader of the Muslim world. Following the end of World War I and the signing of the Treaty of Versailles, the movement sought to safeguard the interests of the Islamic community. In 1919, the Jallianwala Bagh massacre in Amritsar galvanized Hindus and Muslims to join forces against British colonial rule, leading to the establishment of the Khilafat and non-cooperation movements. These efforts were intended to exert pressure on the British government to grant greater political rights to Indians. Mohandas Karamchand Gandhi lent his support to the Khilafat movement, emerging as a prominent leader in the Indian independence movement.

While Ashraf Ali Thanwi shared the same goals and objectives as the Khilafat Movement, he differed on the tactics needed to achieve them. Consequently, like Muhammad Ali Jinnah and Muhammad Iqbal, he distanced himself from the movement. But before, in 1913, he actively participated in all the initiatives aimed at assisting the Muslims in the Balkans. At several rallies, he encouraged Indian Muslims to extend full support to their fellow Muslims affected by the Balkan Wars. During a massive rally in Delhi on 7 April 1913, Ashraf Ali Thanwi spoke to everyone, regardless of their religious affiliation, urging them to help the oppressed Turkish Muslim orphans, widows, and those who were helpless.

== Indian National Congress ==
The Indian National Congress was established in 1885 to advocate for Indian interests under British colonial rule. Initially, Congress leaders had moderate demands and aimed to work within the colonial administration to achieve their goals. However, Syed Ahmad Khan was the first Muslim to publicly oppose Congress. Similarly, Ashraf Ali Thanwi cautioned Muslims against joining Congress due to the predominance of Hindus in the organization and their control of important positions. Thanwi advised Muslims to join the Muslim League, despite its flaws, as Muslims were in the majority and had the potential to correct those flaws. He believed that Congress could not work in the interests of Muslims and that keeping a distance from Congress would be more beneficial. On the other hand, joining the Muslim League would serve the interests of Muslims.

During an election in Saharanpur, Congress members spread the message that voting for the Muslim League was unjustified. Muslim League workers sought clarification from Thanwi on whether it was permissible to vote for Congress instead. Thanwi responded by explaining the Sharia position on voting, stating that it would be harmful to Islam and Muslims to vote for Congress candidates. He believed that anyone seeking to become a Legislative member through Congress was not working for the welfare of Muslims. Thanwi suggested that every Indian Muslim should join the Muslim League, and that it was not appropriate for any Muslim to join Congress based on their current situation. The Secretary of the Allahabad Muslim League Committee posed the same question to Thanwi in 1938, to which he gave the same answer.

In 1939, Thanwi was invited to attend a meeting of the Jamiat Ulema-e-Hind, which was in alliance with the Congress party. He declined the invitation and wrote a message on the back of the invitation card expressing his strong opposition to Congress. He stated that it would be destructive for the religious aspect of the Ulama to be associated with Congress and referred to their rule between 1937 and 1939. He believed it would be more appropriate for them to leave Congress and join a suitable Muslim organization since joining Congress was spiritually equivalent to participating in a deadly sin.

Muhammad Iqbal and Thanwi shared the same idea about joining the Congress. Both believed that Muslim participation in the Congress, without any conditions, would be detrimental to both Islam and Muslims. According to B. R. Ambedkar, the author of India's Constitution, the Congress became powerful and widespread due to Muslim participation, not solely because of Hindus. Prior to Muslim involvement, the Congress was merely a paper organization. However, when Muslims began to participate in Congress activities during the Khilafat movement, the public's faith in the organization was rekindled. Thanwi repeatedly explained this situation during his meetings and emphasized that Muslim participation was key to making the Congress acceptable to the general public. Muslims managed to revive the Congress in a very short time, which had been originally created by Hindus over fifty years ago. As long as Muslims refrained from joining the Congress, it remained unknown to the general public.

Thanwi held the belief that Muslims lost their interest in religion and faith after being in contact with the Congress. He compared the Congress to the Bolshevik revolution, which had removed religious consciousness from people's hearts and transformed them into irreligious beings. During a gathering, he cautioned that any Muslim who worked outside the boundaries of Sharia would face severe punishment, and therefore, the Congress was not supported. According to him, the Congress was just a form of atheism and could not be considered a helper of Islam in any way. Thanwi firmly believed that joining the Congress was harmful to religion and the nation, leading to the destruction of Islam and Muslims. He also warned against Muslims working with Hindus or mixing Hindus with Muslims, as it would cause terrible damage to both communities and religions. In his opinion, Hindus and Congress members were not sincere in their desire to separate India from the British Raj, but rather used the British to achieve their own victory in their community and religion.

== All-India Muslim League ==
The All-India Muslim League was founded in Dhaka, Bangladesh, in 1906 to give Indian Muslims a political platform to voice their concerns and fight for their rights. The league was initially limited to the elite class, but in 1935, Muhammad Ali Jinnah reorganized it to represent Muslims of all classes and establish an independent Muslim political organization. This expansion raised questions about the compatibility of Sharia with joining the Muslim League, leading religious leaders to seek the opinions of prominent scholars such as Thanwi. Thanwi sent a questionnaire to the Muslim League and Jamiat Ulema-e-Hind, prepared by Zafar Ahmad Usmani to make decisions based on Sharia guidelines. After Thanwi made some edits to the questions, they were sent to the central offices of the Muslim League and Jamiat Ulema-e-Hind.

=== Questions to Muslim League ===
Ashraf Ali Thanwi had several questions for the Muslim League. These are:

1. In your opinion, why is joining the Congress party detrimental to the Muslim community from a political standpoint? Why is it necessary to avoid associating with Congress?
2. Can India attain independence without the support of Congress? If yes, how can this be achieved?
3. Will the attainment of India's independence be impeded or delayed by non-cooperation with Congress, or will it have no impact?
4. Is it possible for the Muslim League to prevent all or a majority of Muslims from joining Congress? It seems unlikely, as many Muslims have already joined Congress and Muslim leaders have even become partners in power. If the Muslim League can only prevent a small number of Muslims from joining Congress, what would be the benefit? As the majority of people are still joining Congress.
5. Are the majority of top leaders of the Muslim League not allies of the British and working for their own benefit? Is the statement "Muslim League is British poison," as Akbar Hydari said, accurate?
6. The opposition alleges that the Muslim League is an inactive organization that has not done anything for the welfare of Muslims and has played no role in their betterment, similar to Congress. They argue that the actions taken by the Muslim League against Congress in the current election will not benefit Muslims, but instead, benefit the British, as Congress's activities will weaken and delay India's independence. What is your response to these allegations?
7. What has the Muslim League accomplished for the betterment of Muslims in terms of their religious, social, and economic welfare, and in which areas has it played a role?
8. If the Muslim League feels the need to join Congress by resolving all the issues in the agreement, will the Muslim League break and join Congress, or will it remain independent while joining hands with Congress?
9. If the ulemas want to join the Muslim League, will they have to go through the election process to be included in the central committee, and will they have the right to express their opinions at the central level? What position will the ulemas hold in the Muslim League? If any mutual disagreement arises among the ulemas on any matter, how will this difference be resolved?
10. Is the Muslim League experiencing any harm due to conflicting views and violence among Jamiat Ulema-e-Hind and the Muslim League, which is causing division and disunity among Muslims? If yes, what measures have they taken to address this opposition or damage?
11. Has the Muslim League ever felt the need to propagate Islam among the lower-class groups mentioned below, not only from a religious but also from a political perspective? If yes, what effective steps have they taken?

=== Answer of Muslim League ===
Nawab Mohammad Ismail Khan and Syed Hasan Riyaz, representing the Muslim League, crafted responses to the questions posed by Ashraf Ali Thanwi. The letters were dispatched by Syed Zakir Ali to Thanwi on 25 December 1938, via post.

== Pakistan movement ==
According to Abdul Majid Daryabadi's tome Ḥakīm al-Ummat, it was Ashraf Ali Thanwi who first articulated the concept of a distinct Muslim state.

== See also ==
- Bibliography of Ashraf Ali Thanwi
