= Bahishti Zewar =

Book by Ashraf Ali Thanwi

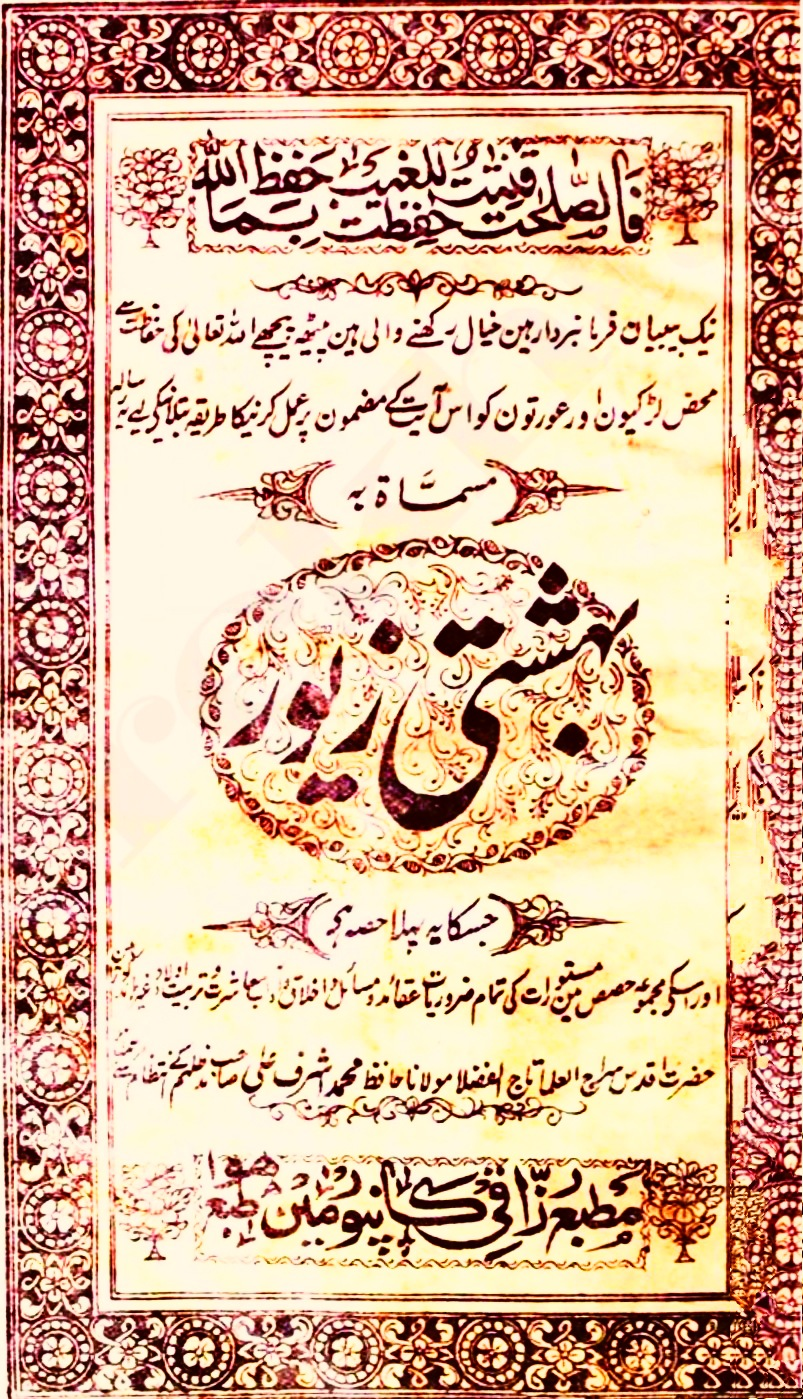
- 1909 edition
- Author: Ashraf Ali Thanwi; Ahmed Ali Fatehpuri
- Language: Urdu
- Genre: Fiqh

Bahishti Zewar (Urdu: بہشتی زیور transl. "jewels of paradise"; English: Heavenly Ornaments) is a volume of Deobandi beliefs and practices written by Ashraf Ali Thanwi and Ahmed Ali Fatehpuri.

== Legacy ==
Barbara Daly Metcalf's 1992 book Perfecting Women is a commentary and history of the Bahishti Zewar.

== See also ==
- Ashraf Ali Thanwi
