= Imdad al-Fatawa =

Book by Ashraf Ali Thanwi

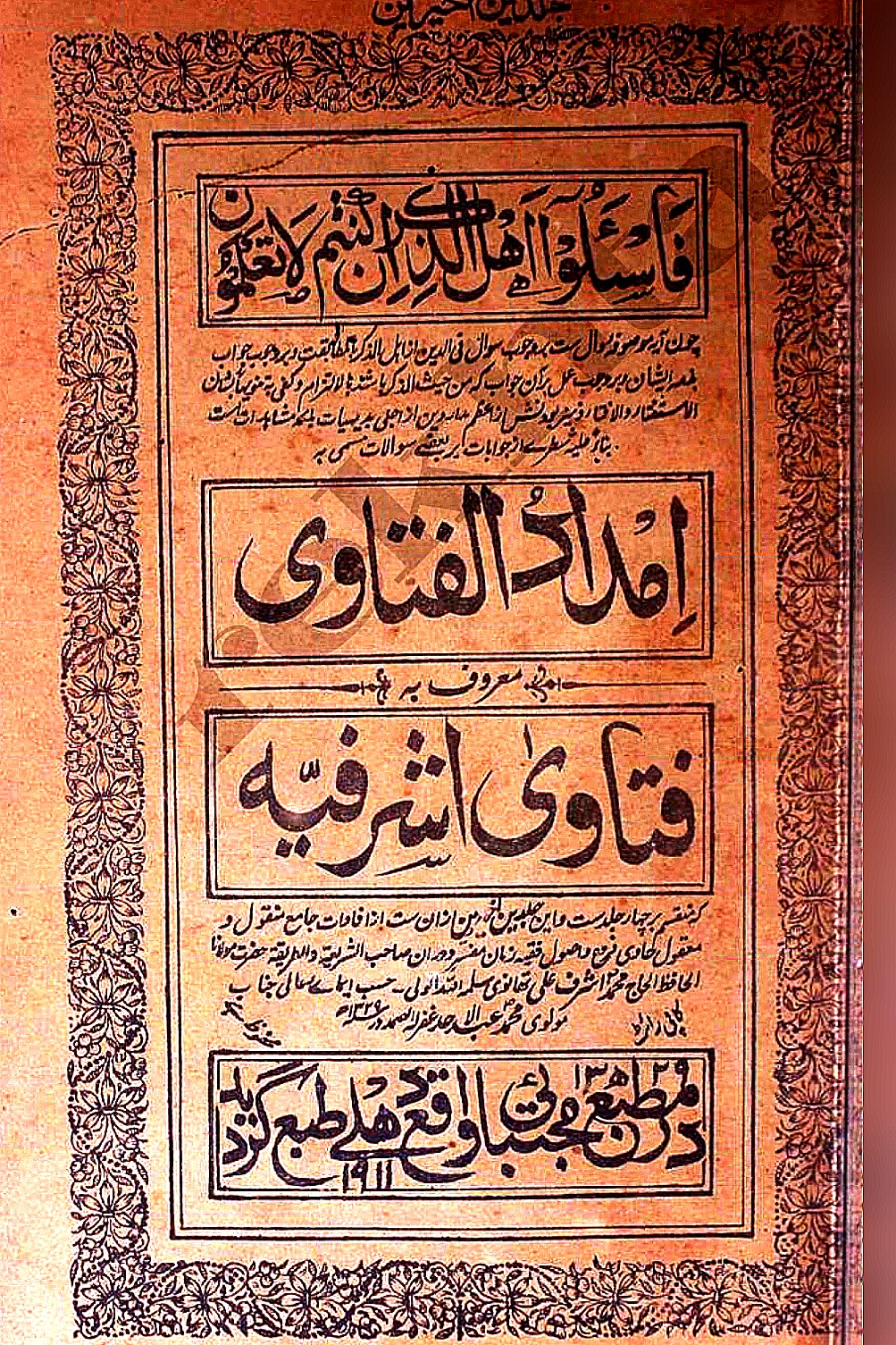
- Urdu Cover
- Editor: Muhammad Shafi
- Author: Ashraf Ali Thanwi
- Original title: امداد الفتاوى
- Language: Urdu
- Subject: Fiqh
- Genre: Fatwa
- Publication place: British India
- Media type: Print

Imdad al-Fatawa (Urdu: امداد الفتاوى), also known as Fatawa Ashrafia, is a collection of fatwas in the Hanafi fiqh compiled by Ashraf Ali Thanwi, a scholar from India who addressed new issues and challenges. The book was refined and arranged by his successor and disciple, Muhammad Shafi, and it contains topics ranging from purification and prayer to issues related to the interpretation of the Quran, Hadith, Sufism, and theology. The six-volume book covers various topics such as marriage, divorce, inheritance, prohibited and permissible activities, and more.

== Background ==
In the initial days, the book consisted of four volumes, but later more volumes were added by arranging and publishing the parts of the book.

== Content ==
Volume 1 of the book includes the Book of Purification, Book of Prayer, Book of Recitation and Reading, and Book of Funeral Prayer. Volume 2 covers the Book of Zakat and Charity, Book of Fasting and Seclusion, Book of Ihram and the Rites of Hajj, Book of Marriage, Book of Prohibitions, Book of Friends and Guardians, Book of Divorce, Book of Punishments and Retributions, Book of Faith, Book of Endowments, Book of Vows, Book of Laws, and Mosques. Volume 3 covers the Book of Sales, Book of Usury, Book of Guardianship, Book of Allah, Book of Shame, Book of Renting, Book of Lawsuits, Book of Judgments, Book of Mediation, Book of Mercy, Book of Arbitration, Book of Partnership and Division, Book of Agriculture, Book of Offences, Book of Wills, Book of Inheritance, Book of Reconciliation, and Book of Damages. Volume 4 covers the Book of Prohibitions and Permissions, which details what is permissible, impermissible, reprehensible, and desirable, as well as teaching and learning, impurities and purifications, halal and haram food and drink, rules regarding gifts and invitations, clothing, gold, silver, copper, and iron, and topics related to marriage and fornication. Volume 5 covers interpretation of the Quran, Hadith, Suluk (Sufism), Ruya, Bidat, beliefs, and theology. Finally, Volume 6 covers miscellaneous issues such as grammar and doubts, debates with false sects, new philosophy, Karamat, subsidiary topics, and more.

== See also ==
- Deobandi fiqh
