= Shahidi Mosque =

Mosque in Kishoreganj, Bangladesh

Shahidi Masjid
- শহীদী মসজিদ
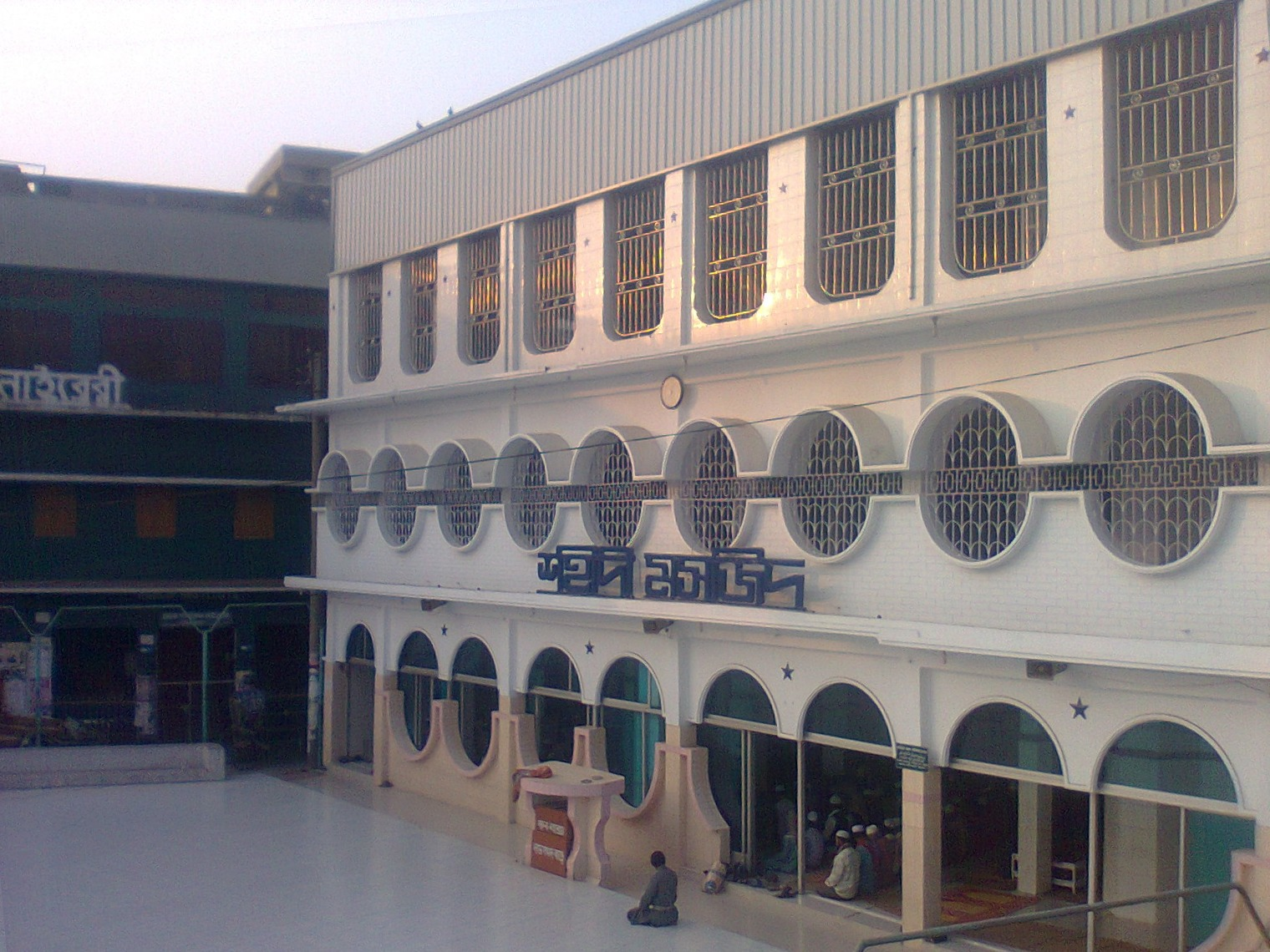

- Location of the mosque in Bangladesh

Religion
- Affiliation: Islam
- Ecclesiastical or organizational status: Mosque
- Status: Active

Location
- Location: Kishoreganj
- Country: Bangladesh
- Interactive map of Shahidi Masjid
- Coordinates: 24°26′03″N 90°47′05″E

Architecture
- Type: Mosque architecture
- Minaret: One

The Shahidi Masjid (Bengali: শহীদী মসজিদ; lit. 'Martys' Mosque') is a three-storey mosque, located in the Kishoreganj District of Bangladesh. A 5-storey minaret is attached to the mosque.

== History ==
The Friday mosque was previously known as the Jame Masjid. On 24 October 1942, in the midst of communal tensions, British Indian police fired on the mosque, killing several Muslims and worshippers. The mosque was subsequently renamed as Shahidi Masjid, or the Martyrs' Mosque.

In 1938, Athar Ali Bengali arrived to Kishoreganj where he rebuilt the mosque and served as an imam. In 1945, Ali established the Jamia Emdadia Madrasa in Kishoreganj on the premises of the mosque. He established the 5-storey minaret in 1957.

== See also ==
- Islam in Bangladesh
- List of mosques in Bangladesh
