= Athar Ali =

Bangladeshi politician

Mawlana Athar Ali
- আতহার আলী

Personal life
- Born: 1891 Ghungadiya, Bengal Presidency, British India
- Died: 6 October 1976 (aged 84–85) Darul Uloom Madrasa, Mymensingh, Bangladesh
- Political party: Nizam-e-Islam
- Education: Jhingabari Alia Madrasah; Jamia Qasmia Madrasa Shahi; Madrasa-e-Aliya, Rampur; Mazahir Uloom; Darul Uloom Deoband

Religious life
- Religion: Islam

Senior posting
- Teacher: Ashraf Ali Thanwi, Anwar Shah Kashmiri and Shabbir Ahmad Usmani
- Students: Maulana Ahmad Ali Khan
- Influenced: Waliur Rahman

Athar Ali (Bengali: আতহার আলী; 1891 – 6 October 1976) was a Bangladeshi Islamic activist, author, teacher, and politician. He participated in the Indian independence movement, and was former president of the Nizam-e-Islam Party. Ali was also a khalifah of Ashraf Ali Thanwi, one of the founders of the Deobandi movement.

== Early life ==
Ali was born into a Bengali Muslim family in the village of Ghungadia Nawangaon, Beanibazar, Sylhet District, Bengal Presidency, British India. His father, Azim Khan, was a Moulvi. Ali completed his primary and secondary education at the Jhingabari Alia Madrasah.

He then moved to North India where he studied the Islamic sciences at the Jamia Qasmia Madrasa Shahi in Moradabad, the Madrasa Aliya of Rampur State and subsequently the Mazahir Uloom in Saharanpur. He then did Hadith studies at the Darul Uloom Deoband under Anwar Shah Kashmiri and Shabbir Ahmad Usmani, which he graduated from in 1338 AH (1919–1920 CE). Ali then served under Ashraf Ali Thanwi from whom he studied the Batin for three years and gained Khilafat from.

== Career ==
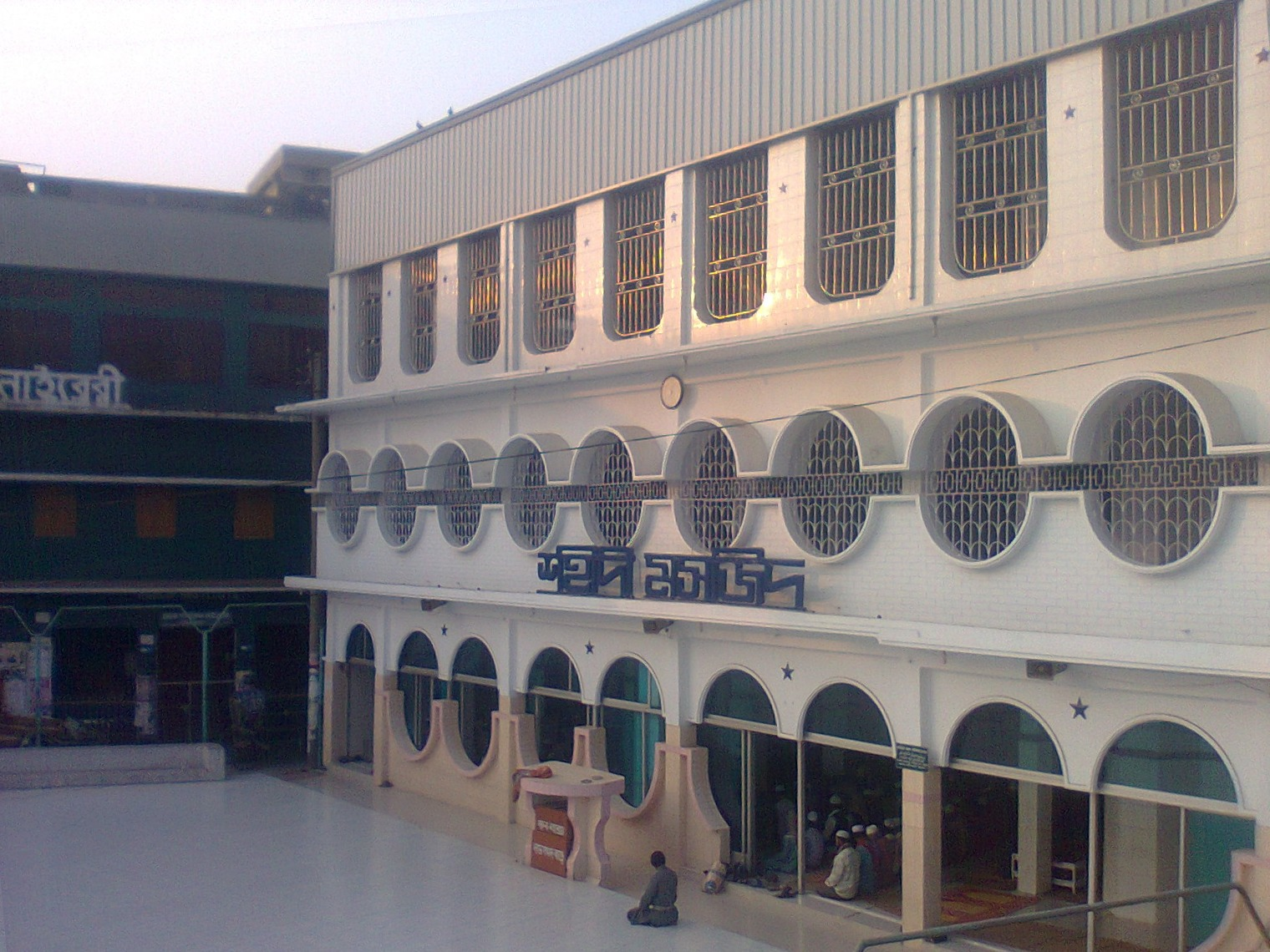
The Shahidi Mosque in Kishoreganj was the residence of its former imam Athar Ali

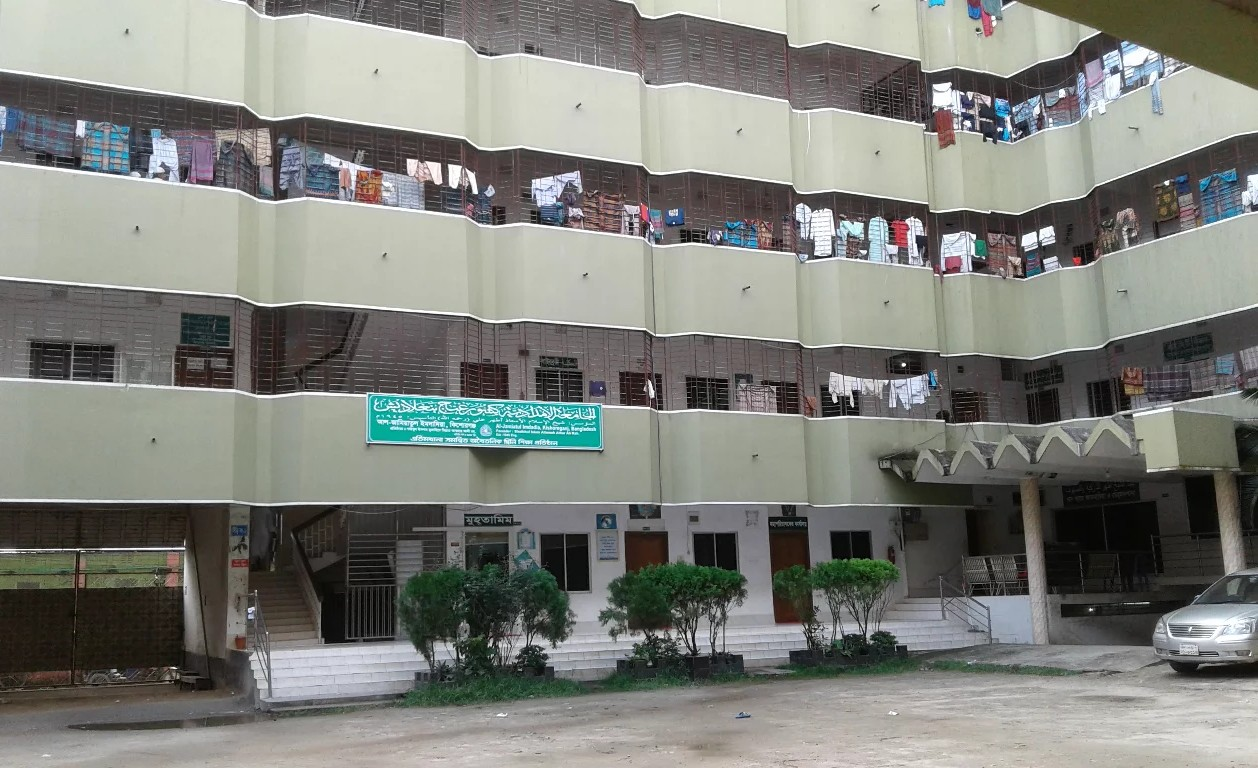
Al-Jamia al-Emdadia Madrasa founded by Athar Ali Bengali

Ali's career began with teaching at madrasas in Bengal such as the Jhingabari Alia Madrasah in Sylhet, Jamia Islamia Yunusia in Brahmanbaria and the Jamia Millia in Comilla. By 1909, he was working as an imam of the Shahidi Mosque in Kishoreganj. In 1945, Ali established the Jamia Emdadia Madrasa in Kishoreganj on the premises of the mosque. He also later founded the Darul Uloom Madrasa in Mymensingh.

His participation in politics began with the 1947 Sylhet referendum campaigns which led to the incorporation of Sylhet into the Dominion of Pakistan. He was first a member of the Jamiat Ulema-e-Islam party. In 1952, he was elected as the president of the Nizam-e-Islam Party. Ali's party, which formed a coalition under the United Front, succeeded during the 1954 East Bengal Legislative Assembly elections, gaining 36 total seats in the National Assembly. Ali was a Member of Parliament in the 2nd National Assembly of Pakistan for the Kishoreganj West constituency. He had worked for including Islam in the legal system. He also advocated for the restoration of democratic rights during the presidency of Ayub Khan and was subsequently imprisoned.

He was released before the start of the 1965 Indo-Pakistani War, and drifted away from politics. He began focusing more on propagating Islamic teachings to the Bengali Muslim masses through public lectures.

== Bibliography ==
He wrote a number of books relating to Islam. These include:

- Bengali: পর্দা ও ইসলাম, romanized: Pôrda O Islam, lit. 'Purdah and Islam'
- Al-Wajru wa an-Nazru
- Bengali: ইসলামী শাসন কেন চাই?, romanized: Islamī Shashôn Kenô Chai?, lit. 'Why do I want Islamic rule?'
- Bengali: বাস্তব ক্ষেত্রে সমাজতন্ত্র, romanized: Bastôb Kkhetre Shômajtôntrô, lit. 'Socialism in reality'
- Bengali: ইসলামে অর্থবন্টন ব্যবস্থা, romanized: Islame Ôrthôbônṭôn Bebôstha, lit. 'System of economic distribution in Islam'

== Death ==
Ali died on 6 October 1976 in the premises of a madrasa that he had founded, the Jamia Al Islamia, Chorpara in Mymensingh, Bangladesh, as a result of paralysis.

== See also ==
- List of Deobandis
