= Yusuf Karaan =

South African Sunni Muslim scholar

Personal life
- Born: 15 November 1935
- Died: 10 May 2015 (aged 79)
- Children: Taha Karaan
- Education: Darul Uloom Deoband

Religious life
- Religion: Islam

Yusuf Karaan (also written as Yousuf Abdullah Karaan) (15 November 1935 - 10 May 2015) was a South African Sunni Muslim scholar from Strand who served as head mufti of Muslim Judicial Council.

== Biography ==
Karaan was born on 15 November 1935. He acquired his primary education from Strand Moslem Primary School and Methodist Mission School and completed his matriculation from Athlone Secondary School in 1952. In 1957, he moved to India where he studied at Darul Uloom Deoband for five years and graduated in 1962. He was a co-founder of Strand Progressive society in 1955. He played a key role in unifying four groups of the Strand Muslim Community under the umbrella of one Strand Muslim Council in 1966. According to the author of Footprints, M.A. Baderoen "The main catalyst in the formation of this new organization was Moulana Yusuf Karaan who was an outstanding speaker and impressed the local community with his sincerity, and enthusiasm to unite the community under a single governing body". He also played a key role in the foundation of United Ulema Council of South Africa in 1994.

He died on 10 May 2015 in Strand, Western Cape. His son Taha Karaan was also an Islamic scholar who established Dar al-Ulum al-Arabiyyah al-Islamiyyah in Strand.

== Literary works ==
Karaan's works include his translations to Islamic theological texts. Some are:

- Kitaabul Fiqh, English translation of Ashraf Ali Thanwi's Hanafi fiqh manual Din Ki Baatein.
- A Gift to Muslim Couple, English translation of Ashraf Ali Thanwi's Tuhfatuz Zawjayn.
- Stories of the Prophets, English translation of Hifzur Rahman Seoharwi's Qassasul Ambiyaa.
- Tuhfatul Ikhwan of Ibrahim Ba'kathah.
- Khutbaatul Ahkam of Ashraf Ali Thanwi.
- Fadhail e Hajj of Zakariyya Kandhlawi.
- Ma'ārif-e-Masnawi of Hakeem Muhammad Akhtar

== See also ==
- Deobandi movement in South Africa
- List of Deobandis
