= Qamaruzzaman Allahabadi =

Indian Islamic scholar and Sufi (born 1933)

Personal life
- Born: December 1933 (age 92) Karisath, Mau district, Uttar Pradesh, India
- Main interest(s): Islamic studies, Hadith, Fiqh, Sufism
- Notable work(s): Aqwāl-e-Salaf, Riyāḍ al-Sālikīn, Taṭhīr al-Qulūb

Religious life
- Religion: Islam
- Denomination: Sunni
- Jurisprudence: Hanafi
- Tariqa: Chishti, Naqshbandi, Qadiri, Suhrawardi
- Creed: Maturidi
- Movement: Deobandi

Muslim leader
- Disciple of: Wasiullah Fatehpuri; Muhammad Ahmad Pratapgarhi

Qamaruzzaman Allahabadi (born December 1933) is an Indian Islamic scholar and Sufi spiritual guide based in Allahabad, Uttar Pradesh. He received spiritual authorization (ijazah) from Wasiullah Fatehpuri, is associated with the Chishti, Naqshbandi, Qadiri, and Suhrawardi Sufi orders, founded Madrasa Arabiyya Baytul Ma'arif in Allahabad, and authored several works on Islamic studies.

== Early life and education ==
Qamaruzzaman Allahabadi was born in December 1933 (Sha'ban 1352 AH) in Karisath, Mau district (formerly Azamgarh district). His father, Sultan Ahmad Khan, was associated with Wasiullah Fatehpuri, and during his childhood Allahabadi would accompany him on visits to Fatehpuri.

He received his early education up to the second grade at an Islamic maktab in his village, which later developed into a madrasa. He then continued his studies up to the middle level (equivalent at the time to the seventh grade) in the town of Ghosi.

After completing his general education, he enrolled at Darul Uloom Mau, where he studied Persian and religious texts up to Nur al-Idah. In Sha'ban 1370 AH (1950), he joined the khanqah of Fatehpuri. There, alongside spiritual training and moral reform, he completed the remaining Dars-e-Nizami curriculum up to Sahih al-Bukhari under Fatehpuri and also studied several works on Sufism with him.

Fatehpuri placed full trust in Allahabadi and granted him authorization (ijazah) to transmit Sahih al-Bukhari and other Hadith collections. Between Shawwal 1387 AH and Sha'ban 1388 AH, Allahabadi studied Sahih al-Bukhari at Madrasa Wasiyatul Uloom under Fatehpuri, Sahih Muslim under Abdur Rahman Jami, and Jami' al-Tirmidhi under Muhammad Hanif Jaunpuri.

He also received authorization (ijazah) to transmit Hadith from Habibur Rahman Azami and Zakariyya Kandhlawi.

== Career ==
During his period of residence in Gorakhpur, Fatehpuri entrusted Allahabadi with formal teaching responsibilities, along with a stipend, while he was still a student. He later appointed him as head teacher at Madrasa Wasiyatul Uloom, Allahabad, where Allahabadi taught texts including Tawdih wa Talwih, Mishkat al-Masabih, Tafsir al-Jalalayn, and al-Hidayah.

On 28 Dhu al-Hijjah 1395 AH (1 January 1976), Allahabadi founded Madrasa Arabiyya Baytul Ma'arif in Bakhshi Bazaar, Allahabad. He remained associated with the institution in a teaching capacity, and his khanqah is also located there.

In July 2004, during a visit to New Delhi, Allahabadi addressed meetings at the central office of the All India Talimi Wa Milli Foundation and at Batla House Jama Masjid, where he spoke to members of the Muslim community on moderation in religious and social conduct.

== Spiritual life ==
Allahabadi established a relationship of bay'ah (initiation) and spiritual training with Wasiullah Fatehpuri, under whom he studied several works on Sufism and from whom he received authorization for spiritual instruction (tadhkīr and talqīn). After Fatehpuri's death, Allahabadi turned to Muhammad Ahmad Pratapgarhi, who granted him authorization for spiritual instruction as well as permission for initiation and spiritual succession (bay'ah and khilafah) in the four Sufi orders: Chishti, Naqshbandi, Qadiri, and Suhrawardi.

== Personal life ==
Allahabadi entered into two marriages. His first marriage took place in June 1959 (Rajab 1370 AH) with 'Aqīlah Khatoon, the second daughter of Wasiullah Fatehpuri. From this marriage, he had four sons: Maqbool Ahmad Qasmi, Saeed Ahmad Qasmi Nadwi, Aziz Ahmad Qasmi, and Mahboob Ahmad Nadwi. After the death of 'Aqīlah Khatoon on 3 Shawwal 1379 AH, he married Taqribun Nisa, daughter of Noorul Hasan of his native town, on 22 Jumad al-Ukhra 1381 AH. From this marriage, he had two sons, Muhammad Abdullah Qasmi and Ubaidullah Nadwi, as well as four daughters.

== Literary works ==
Allahabadi authored several books comprising thousands of pages. His works include:

- Aqwāl-e-Salaf (six volumes)
- Tarbiyat-e-Aulād kā Islāmī Niẓām
- Riyāḍ al-Sālikīn min Aḥādīth Sayyid al-Mursalīn (also known as Guldasta-e-Adhkār)
- Tadhkirah-e-Muṣliḥ al-Ummat
- Fayḍān-e-Muḥabbat
- Waṣiyyatul Ādāb
- Ma'ārif-e-Ṣūfiyah
- Nuqūsh-o-Āthār-e-Mufakkir-e-Islām
- Nikāḥ kī Shar‘ī Ḥaythiyyat
- Ḥaqīqī Ḥajj
- Dars-e-Qur'ān
- Taṭhīr al-Qulūb (also known as Ṭahārat-e-Qalb)
- Gunāhon kā Wabāl aur Us kā 'Ilāj
