= Fateh Pur Tal Naraja =

Village in Uttar Pradesh, India

Fatehpur Tal Narja
- Village
- Country: India
- State: Uttar Pradesh
- Region: Purvanchal
- District: Mau
- Division: Kopaganj
- Tehsil: Ghosi
- Time zone: UTC+5:30 (IST)
- PIN: 275302
- Telephone code: NA
- Vehicle registration: UP

Fatehpur Tal Narja is a village in the Mau district of Uttar Pradesh, India. It falls under the Ghosi tehsil and is part of the Kopaganj division in the Purvanchal region. The village is served by the Fateh Pur Tal Narja Branch Post Office, under the Mau Head Office. It is believed by the residents of the village, that they are descender of Kunwar Singh who later converted to Islam.

== Postal administration ==
Fateh Pur Tal Naraja is served by a Branch Office (B.O.) of India Post with the PIN code 275302. The post office functions under Bhopaura Sub Office and Mau Head Office. Administratively, the village is located in the Ghosi postal taluk, within Mau district, and falls under the Gorakhpur postal region and Azamgarh postal division of the Uttar Pradesh Postal Circle.

== Notable people ==
- Wasiullah Fatehpuri

== Residing Families ==
- Meraj Khan
