= Muhammad Ahmad Pratapgarhi =

Indian Islamic scholar, Sufi, and poet (1899–1991)

Personal life
- Born: 1899 Phulpur village, Pratapgarh district, North-Western Provinces, British India
- Died: 12 October 1991 (aged 91–92) Allahabad, Uttar Pradesh, India
- Notable work: 'Irfān-e-Mohabbat (poetry collection)

Religious life
- Religion: Islam
- Denomination: Sunni
- Jurisprudence: Hanafi
- Tariqa: Chishti, Naqshbandi, Qadiri, Suhrawardi
- Creed: Maturidi
- Movement: Deobandi

Muslim leader
- Disciple of: Badr Ali Shah Raibarelvi; Waris Hasan Kora Jahanabadi
- Disciples: Hakeem Muhammad Akhtar Qamaruzzaman Allahabadi

Muhammad Ahmad Pratapgarhi (1899–1991) was an Indian Islamic scholar, Sufi, and poet. In Sufism, he was an authorised disciple of Waris Hasan Kora Jahanabadi and Badr Ali Shah Raibarelvi. His written works include several religious texts and a poetry collection titled Irfan-e-Mohabbat.

== Early life and education ==
Muhammad Ahmad Pratapgarhi was born in 1317 AH (1899 CE) in Phulpur village, Pratapgarh district. His father, Ghulam Muhammad, was affiliated through spiritual allegiance (bayʿah) with Fazl-e-Rahman Ganj Muradabadi.

He received his early education in his native village. He later studied Persian, Arabic, and Hadith under Badr Ali Shah Raibarelvi, a disciple and authorized successor (khalifah) of Fazl-e-Rahman Ganj Muradabadi. Since Ganj Muradabadi was a student of Shah Abdul Aziz Dehlavi, Pratapgarhi was connected to Dehlavi through two intermediary teachers.

He completed his spiritual training (tasawwuf) at the Tila Wali Mosque in Lucknow under Waris Hasan Kora Jahanabadi, a disciple of Rashid Ahmad Gangohi and a khalifah of Mahmud Hasan Deobandi, from whom he received authorization for spiritual initiation and succession. He also received authorization in spiritual practice from Badr Ali Shah Raibarelvi.

== Career ==
During his youth and later years, Pratapgarhi was engaged in religious instruction and missionary activities. He traveled to various villages for religious outreach and reform.

He initially resided in his native village of Phulpur. At different times, he stayed in Pratapgarh town, including at the residence of Baba Najmul Hasan and, after the latter's migration to Pakistan, at the residence of Abdul Wahid. From 1932 onward, he occasionally resided in Allahabad, first in the Daraganj area and later for some time in the localities of Katra and Dariyabad.

From 1400 AH, he resided for approximately four years in the northern chamber of Madrasa Baitul Ma'arif. Due to chronic hemorrhoidal illness and advanced age, his health declined in his later years. As a result, he discontinued travel and took up permanent residence at the home of his physician, Abrar Ahmad. During this period, he ceased traveling to Pratapgarh and Phulpur.

His notable authorised disciples include Hakeem Muhammad Akhtar and Qamaruzzaman Allahabadi.

== Literary works ==
Pratapgarhi's poetry reflects a Sufi orientation. His poetry collection, Irfan-e-Mohabbat, has been published in 1399 AH.

His other written works include:

- Akhlaq-e-Salaf
- Kamalat-e-Nubuwwat
- Roohul Bayān (a collection of sermons in three volumes)
- Sada-e-Ghaib, a compilation of his sayings and discourses compiled by Hakeem Muhammad Akhtar.

== Death and legacy ==
Pratapgarhi died on 12 October 1991 (3 Rabi' al-Thani 1412 AH), on a Sunday night in Allahabad, after a period of illness. He was buried at the Ram Bagh Akela Aam cemetery in Allahabad.

He was survived by three sons and several daughters. His sons include Ishtiyaq Ahmad, Irshad Ahmad, and Qari Mushtaq Ahmad. Qari Mushtaq Ahmad was associated with a religious seminary in Lucknow.
