= Bibliography of Ashraf Ali Thanwi =

This bibliography of Ashraf Ali Thanwi is a selected list of generally available scholarly resources related to Ashraf Ali Thanwi, a leading Islamic scholar, philosopher, writer, preacher, reformer, the author of about one thousands books. He didn't write an autobiography during his lifetime. However, Aziz al-Hasan Ghouri, an authorized disciple of Thanwi, compiled a book from 1935 to 1943, into four volumes entitled Ashraf al-Sawaneh, which is the first and most important book and prime source on the biography of Thanwi. Another Maqalat Hakeemul Ummat was compiled in 34 volumes under the supervision of Taqi Usmani, collected from about 350 publications of Thanwi. This list will include his biographies, theses written on him and articles published about him in various journals, newspapers, encyclopedias, seminars, websites etc. in APA style.

== Encyclopedias ==
- Al-Azhari, Alauddin (1982). Shorter Encyclopaedia of Islam (in Bengali) (5th ed.). Sherbangla Nagar, Dhaka: Islamic Foundation Bangladesh. pp. 84–85. ISBN 984-06-0252-7.
- Ansari, A. S. Bazmee (1995). "ESREF ALI". TDV Encyclopedia of Islam, Vol. 11 (Elbi̇stan – Eymi̇r) (in Turkish). Istanbul: Presidency of Religious Affairs, Centre for Islamic Studies. pp. 472–473. ISBN 978-975-389-438-8.
- Belhaj, Abdessamad (2014), "Thānvī, Ashraf ʿAlī", The Oxford Encyclopedia of Philosophy, Science and Technology in Islam, Oxford University Press, ISBN 978-0-19-981257-8
- Esposito, John L. (2003), "Thanawi, Ashraf Ali", The Oxford Dictionary of Islam, Oxford University Press, ISBN 978-0-19-512558-0
- Ingram, Brannon (2018), "Ashraf 'Alī Thānawī", in Kassam, Zayn R.; Greenberg, Yudit Kornberg; Bagli, Jehan (eds.), Islam, Judaism, and Zoroastrianism, Encyclopedia of Indian Religions, Dordrecht: Springer Netherlands, pp. 81–84, doi:10.1007/978-94-024-1267-3_787, ISBN 978-94-024-1267-3
- Naeem, Fuad (2009), "Thānvī, Mawlānā Ashraf ʿAlī", The Oxford Encyclopedia of the Islamic World, Oxford University Press, ISBN 978-0-19-530513-5

== Biographies ==
- Abdullah, Mohammad (2002). Life and works of Maulana Mujaddid Ashraf Ali Thanwi Rah (PDF) (2nd ed.). Delhi: Adam Publishers & Distributors. ISBN 81-7435-111-6. OCLC 968650263.
- Abdush Shakūr Tirmizī, Sayyid (2001). Ashrafulmaʻārif: Shāh Muḥammad Ashraf ʻAlī Thānvī kī tafsīr va ḥ̣adīs (in Urdu). Lāhaur : Sargodhā: Kutub Ḵẖānah Jamīlī; Jāmiʻah Ḥaqqāniyyah.
- Ahmad, Furqan (2018). Towards the Renaissance: Shibli and Maulana Thanvi on Sharia. Indian Law Institute. ISBN 978-81-927926-3-7.
- ʻĀrifī, Muḥammad ʻAbdulḥaʼī; ʻAlvī, Masʻūd Aḥsan (1976). Maʾās̲ir-i Ḥakīmulummat: irshādāt va ifādāt (in Urdu). Karācī: Ec.Em. Saʻīd Kampanī.
- Ashraf, Rana Muhammad (2022). Hazrat Hakeem Ul Ummat Aur Un K Khulfa Ki Siyasi Khidmaat Ka Jaiza (PDF) (in Urdu). India: Idarah Talifat-e Ashrafiya.
- Buk̲h̲ārī, Muḥammad Akbar Shāh (1997). Karwan-e Thanwi : 192 disciples of Hazrat Maulana Ashraf Tahanawi (in Urdu). Pakistan: Idaratul Ma'arif.
- Daryabadi, Abdul Majid (1967). Ḥakīmul Ummat (PDF) (in Urdu).
- Hai, Mohammad Abdul; Memon, Muḥammad ʻAbdullāh. (1987). Fihrist-i taʾlīfāt-i Ḥakīmulummat (in Urdu). Karācī : Lāhaur: Maktabah-yi Dārulʻulūm; Milne ke pate, Idārahyi Islāmiyāt.
- Ḥasan, Sayyid Maḥmūd. (1976). Ḥaz̤rat Ḥakīmulummat Thānvī: akābir aur muʻāṣirīn kī naẓar me. Silsilah-yi mat̤būʻāt-i Maktabah-yi Ashrafiyah;5 (in Urdu). Karācī: Kutub Ḵẖānah-yi Maẓharī.
- Īlahābādī, Muḥammad ʻĪsʹa (2003). Malfūẓāt-i kamālāt-i Ashrafiyah (in Urdu). Multān: Idārah-yi Tālīfāt-i Ashrafiyah : Milne ke pate, Dārulishāʻat.
- Isqeel, Abdullateef Ayodele; Daoud, Jamal Ibrahim (2011), Contributions of Ashraf Ali Thanwi to mental disease treatment, Kuala Lumpur: IIUM Press, pp. 49–53, ISBN 978-967-418-155-0, archived from the original on 17 March 2014
- K̲h̲ān, Abdurraḥmān (1977–1979). Sīrat-i Ashraf (in Urdu). Lāhaur: Shaiḵẖ Akaiḍaimī.
- Khawaja, Ahmad Ali (1999). Maulana Ashraf Ali Thanvi : his views on religious and moral philosophy, and tasawwuf (1st ed.). New Delhi: Kitab Bhavan. ISBN 81-7151-269-0. OCLC 863247988.
- Mumtazi, Muhammad Sikander; Abdul Huq, Muhammad (1965). Hāẏāte Āśarāpha (in Urdu).
- Nadwī, Muḥammad Raḥmat Allāh Ḥāfiẓ Muḥammad Nāẓim (2006). Ashraf ʻAlī al-Tahānawī: ḥakīm al-ummah wa-shaykh mashāyikh al-ʻaṣr fī al-Hind. 880-04Aʻlām al-Muslimīn; 91 (in Arabic). Dimashq : Bayrūt: Dār al-Qalam; al-Dār al-Shāmīyah.
- Nāṣir Tāvlavī, Abūlʻarfāt Muḥammad (2001). Ḥaz̤rat-i Thānvī ke uṣūl va z̤vābit (in Urdu). Amārā, Z̤ilaʻ Bāg̲ẖpat: Maktabah-yi Ḥakīmulummat.
- Parvez, Mohammed (2017). Social and religious reforms of Maulānā Ashraf 'Alī Thānvī. New Delhi. ISBN 978-81-7435-750-2. OCLC 1038709379.
- Pernau, Margrit (2019). Ashraf Ali Thanavi: Sermons and Pious Feelings. Oxford University Press. pp. 146–170. doi:10.1093/oso/9780199497775.003.0007. ISBN 978-0-19-949777-5.
- Saʻīd, Aḥmad (1972). Maulānā Ashrafʻ ʻAlī Sāhib Thānvī aur taḥrīk-i āzādī (in Urdu). Rāvalpinḍī: Ḵh̲ālid Nadīm Pablīkeshanz.
- Saʻīd, Aḥmad (1975). Bazm-i Ashraf ke cirāg̲h (in Urdu). Lāhaur: Maktabah-yi Aḥyāʻ-ul-ʻulūm alsharqīyah.
- Siddiqui, Muhammad Ismail. Talifat-e Ashrafiyyah (PDF). India.
- Zaman, Muhammad Qasim (2008). Ashraf 'Ali Thanawi : Islam in modern South Asia. Oxford: Oneworld. ISBN 978-1-85168-415-1. OCLC 153580949.

== Theses ==
- Ahmad, Mian Bashir (1991). An enquiry as to the relevance of the philosophy of education of Maulana Ashraf Ali Thanvi to the present day needs of Education in Pakistan (PhD). Pakistan: University of Peshawar.
- Ali, Sayed Abrar (1999). Hazrat Maulana Ashraf Ali Thanvi's reformation method (PhD) (in Urdu). Pakistan: University of Sindh.
- Al-Rida, Muhammad Iqlim (2011). Ashraf Ali al-Tahanawi and his effort in linking between hadith and sufism through his book Haqiqat al-tariqat min al-sunnah al-aniqah (MA thesis) (in Arabic). Malaysia: University of Malaya.
- Bano, Shazia (2022). Religious Thought of the Subcontinent in the Twentieth Century: A Comparative and Contemporary Study of the Sufi and Social Trends of Maulana Ashraf Ali Thanvi and Shah Abdul Qadir Rai Puri (PhD) (in Urdu). Pakistan: The Women University Multan.
- Hameed, Abdul (2019). Fatwas approach in the Indian subcontinent through books: "Imdad Fatwas" by Mufti Ashraf Ali Al-Thanawy (PhD) (in Arabic). Pakistan: International Islamic University, Islamabad.
- Iqbal, Azhar (2018). Tasawuf o Salook Ki Tajdeed o Islah Main Maulana Ashraf Ali Tahnvi Ki Khidmaat: Tehqeeqi Mutalia (PhD) (in Urdu). Pakistan: University of the Punjab.
- Islam, Muhammad (2020). The Tradition in the Age of Modernity (A Critical Study of Maulana Ashraf Ali Thanavi's Approach to Religion and Modernism) (PhD). Pakistan: University of the Punjab.
- Khamidov, Odil (2019). Eşref Ali Tehânevî'nin Hayatı, Hadis İlmindeki Eserleri ve Görüşleri (MA) (in Turkish). Turkey: Fatih University.
- Khan, Fareeha (2008). Traditionalist Approaches to Shari'ah Reform: Mawlana Ashraf Ali Thanawi's Fatwa on Women's Right to Divorce (PhD thesis). United States: University of Michigan. hdl:2027.42/60731. ISBN 978-1243544063.
- Mian, Ali Altaf (2015). Surviving Modernity: Ashraf Ali Thanvi (1863-1943) and the Making of Muslim Orthodoxy in Colonial India (PhD). Durham, North Carolina, United States: Duke University. hdl:10161/9815.
- Mitu, Muhammad Younus (1999). Allama Iqbal Aur Moulana Muhmmad Ashraf Thanvi K Afkar Ka Taqabli Mutala (PDF) (PhD). Pakistan: Allama Iqbal Open University.
- Nawi, Zaharudin (2007). Sheikh Ashraf Ali Thanawi: An Analytical Study Of His "Haqiqah Al-tariqah Min Al- Sunnah Al-aniqah" (PhD) (in Arabic). Kuala Lumpur: Kulliyah of Islamic Revealed Knowledge and Human Sciences, International Islamic University Malaysia. Archived from the original on 19 October 2022.
- Naz, Kehkashan (2022). Maulana Ashraf Ali Thanvis contribution the uplift of Muslim women (PhD) (in Urdu). India: Department of Islamic Studies, Aligarh Muslim University. hdl:10603/508409.
- Nisar, Sumeera (2021). The Sufi Thought Of Mawlana Ashraf Ali Thanvi (PhD thesis). India: Shah-i-Hamdan Institute of Islamic Studies, University of Kashmir. hdl:10603/476372.
- Parvez, Mohammed (2008). A study of the socio_religious reforms of Maulana Ashraf Ali Thanvi (PhD) (in Urdu). India: Department of Islamic Studies, Aligarh Muslim University. hdl:10603/52380.
- Rashid, Shazia (2016). Aurat Aur Huquq e Niswan Muntakhab Ulama e Hind o Pak Maulana Ashraf Ali Thanvi Aur Maulana Abul Ala Maududi ki Tehreeron ke Aaine Mein (PhD) (in Urdu). India: Department of Islamic Studies, Jamia Hamdard University. hdl:10603/447347.
- Rasul, Saifur Rehman (1992). Educational services of Maulana Ashraf Ali Thanwi Rh (PhD) (in Urdu). Pakistan: Department of Islamic culture, University of Sindh.
- Ullah, Wasi (2019). An Analytical Study Of Hadiths mentioned in Ashraf Ali Thanawi's al-Tashrruf bi M'arifah Ahādīth al-Tasawuf, which are not mentioned in the Sihah Sitta (MA) (in Arabic). Kuala Lumpur: Kulliyah of Islamic Revealed Knowledge and Human Sciences, International Islamic University Malaysia. Archived from the original on 20 October 2022.
- Zia, Rehana (1982). A Critical Study Of Bayanul Quran The Commentary Of The Quran By Maulana Ashraf Ali Thanvi With Special Reference To The Exegetical Literature In Urdu (PhD) (in Urdu). India: Department of Sunni Theology, Aligarh Muslim University. hdl:10603/57075.

== Journals ==
- Al-Ghazali, Muhammad (2001). "Exegetical Urdu Translation of Imam Ashraf Ali Thanvi and some of its characteristics". Al-Dirasat Al-Islamiyyah. 36 (3). ISSN 0002-399X.
- Anwar, Sajid (2019). "Tehreek Qiyam Pakistan: Intellectual Similarity of Abul Ala Maududi and Ashraf Ali Thanwi". Al-Idah (in Urdu). 37 (2): 109–135. doi:10.37556/al-idah.037.02.0567. ISSN 2664-3375. S2CID 213303113.
- Ar-Rahman, Fahmid (2020). "Ashraf Ali Thanwi's Spiritual-Political Thought". Punorpath (in Bengali): 24–45. Archived from the original on 22 October 2022.
- Bano, Shazia; Pracha, Dr Kalsoom (2019). "Social Reformation: A Study of Mawlānā Ashraf ʻAlī Thānvī's Efforts and Approach". Al-Qamar (in Urdu). 2 (1): 245–256. ISSN 2664-4398.
- Falak, Dr Nabeela (2021). "Modern family issues and utilisation of Maulana Ashraf Ali Thanvi's Thought". Al-Qawārīr (in Urdu). 2 (4): 1–10. ISSN 2709-457X.
- Farosh, Hassan; Khan, Abzahir; Adil, Muhammad (2022). "An Introductory Study of Imdād ul-Fatawā of Hazrat Mulānā Ashraf 'Alī Thānvī: An Analyses". Al-Idah. 40 (– 2): 261–276. doi:10.37556/al-idah.040.02.0810. ISSN 2664-3375.
- Faruque, Muhammad U. (2021). "Eternity Made Temporal: Ashraf ʿAlī Thānavī, a Twentieth-Century Indian Thinker and the Revival of Classical Sufi Thought". Journal of Sufi Studies. 9 (2): 215–246. doi:10.1163/22105956-bja10009. ISSN 2210-5948. S2CID 242261580.
- Hermansen, Marcia (2007). "Rewriting Sufi Identity in the 20th Century: The Biographical Approaches of Maulānā Ashraf 'Alī T̲h̲ānvī and Khwājah Ḥasan Niẓāmī". Islamic Studies. 46 (1): 15–39. doi:10.52541/isiri.v46i1.4289. ISSN 0578-8072. JSTOR 20839053.
- Homma, Ryusei (2020). "A Survey of Previous Studies on Ashraf 'Alī Thānavī and Subjects for Future Research". Kyoto Bulletin of Islamic Area Studies (in Japanese). 13: 182–210. doi:10.14989/250334. ISSN 1881-8323.
- Islam, Muhammad (2012). "Review of Kitaabul Fiqh (Diin kii Baaté [sic])". Islamic Studies. 51 (1): 103–108. ISSN 0578-8072. JSTOR 23643929.
- Homma, Ryusei (2021). "Ashraf 'Alī Thānavī's Conception of Sufism: Establishing the Stages of Knowledge about Ethics, Practices, and Metaphysics". Kyoto Bulletin of Islamic Area Studies (in Japanese). 14: 283–306. doi:10.14989/262505. ISSN 1881-8323.
- Kamran, Malak Shahid (2021). "A scholarly review of the Methodology of Ashraf Ali Thanvi in "Tafseer Bayan-ul-Quran"". VFAST Transactions on Islamic Research (in Urdu). 9 (4): 152–163. ISSN 2309-6519.
- Khatoon, Saeeda (1981). "The Traditional Rationalism Of Ashraf Ali Thanvi". Iqbal Review. 32 (3). Iqbal Academy Pakistan. ISSN 0021-0773.
- Khan, Shafqat ullah; Khoso, Aijaz Ali; Badshah, Syed Naeem (2020). "Mysticism And Ashraf Ali Thanawi, An Analytical Approach". The International Research Journal of Usooluddin. 4 (1): 19–24. ISSN 2664-4940.
- Mahdavi Rad, Mohammad Ali; Roshan Zamir, Mohammad Ibrahim; Heydari, Halima Khatoon (2021). "Political and Social Thoughts of Ashraf Ali Tahanavi". 12- Studies Religion Muslems (in Persian). 7 (13): 255–278. ISSN 2476-714X.
- Mian, Ali Altaf; Potter, Nancy Nyquist (2009). "Invoking Islamic Rights In British India: Mawlana Ashraf 'Ali Thanawi's Ḥuqūq al-Islam". The Muslim World. 99 (2): 312–334. doi:10.1111/j.1478-1913.2009.01271.x.
- Naeem, Fuad S. (2009). "Sufism and Revivalism in South Asia: Mawlānā Ashraf 'Alī Thānvī of Deoband and Mawlānā Aḥmad Razā Khān of Bareilly and their paradigms of Islamic revivalism". The Muslim World. 99 (3): 435–451. doi:10.1111/j.1478-1913.2009.01279.x.
- Nasiri, Aliakbar; Dehani, Fatemeh (2018). "The Recourse to the look Ashraf Ali Tahanavi and Khalil Ahmd Saharnpoory". Journal of Subcontinent Researches. 10 (35): 215–228. doi:10.22111/jsr.2018.4624. ISSN 2008-5710.
- Pernau, Margrit; Stille, Max (2021). "Obedient Passion—Passionate Obedience: Ashraf Ali Thanawi's Sermons on the Love of the Prophet". Journal of Religious History. 45 (1): 25–49. doi:10.1111/1467-9809.12727. hdl:21.11116/0000-0006-6BE7-E. ISSN 0022-4227. S2CID 226698611.
- Qasmi, Abdul Latif (2011). "Apparent reasons for the numerous works of Hazrat Maulana Muhammad Ashraf Ali Thanvi". Mahnama Darul Uloom (in Urdu). 95 (10). India: Darul Uloom Deoband.
- Rashid, Burhan (2022). "Principles And Methods For The Management And Regulation Of Finances In Islam: An Approach To Maulana Ashraf Ali Thanavi". International Journal of Islamic Banking and Finance Research. 9 (1): 1–13. doi:10.46281/ijibfr.v9i1.1684. ISSN 2576-4144. S2CID 248093491.
- Robb, Megan Eaton (2017), "Advising the Army of Allah: Ashraf Ali Thanawi's Critique of the Muslim League", in Qasmi, Ali Usman; Robb, Megan Eaton (eds.), Muslims against the Muslim League: Critiques of the Idea of Pakistan, Cambridge: Cambridge University Press, pp. 142–168, doi:10.1017/9781316711224.006, ISBN 978-1-107-16663-9
- Sheraz, Khurram (2020). "Analytical study of the views of Maulana Ashraf Ali Thanawi and Maulana Ahmed Raza Khan Barelvi on"Equator Al-Arsh"". Al-Bahis Journal of Islamic Sciences Research (in Urdu). 1 (2): 63–74. ISSN 2790-0460.
- Tay, Ömer (2021). "Ashraf Ali Thanwi's Views on Lataif in the Context of his Treatise "Risâletü'l-katâif mine'l-latâif"". Mesned İlahiyat Araştırmaları Dergisi (in Turkish). 12 (2): 357–382. doi:10.51605/mesned.898526. ISSN 2667-7075. S2CID 245598440.
- Wani, Bilal Ahmad (2016). "Tafsir Bayan al-Quran of Maulana Ashraf Ali Thanwi: An Estimate". Asian Journal of Multidisciplinary Studies. 4 (2): 198. ISSN 2348-7186. Archived from the original on 20 July 2020.
- Yüksel, Yakup; Tekin, Muhammet Ali (2017). "Sufism In The Thought Of Ashref Ali Thanwi". Namık Kemal Üniversitesi İlahiyat Fakültesi Dergisi (in Turkish). 3 (2): 333–364. ISSN 2147-9828.

== Newspapers ==
- "Hakeem Ummat Hazrat Maulana Ashraf Ali Thanvi". Daily Pakistan (in Urdu). 15 July 2016.
- Haque, Mahfuzul (14 March 2015). "Remembering Hakimul Ummat Ashraf Ali Thanvi Rah". Banglanews24.com (in Bengali). Bangladesh.
- Inqilabi, Mujibur Rahman (9 December 2022). "Maulana Ashraf Ali Thanwi: A Fountain of Knowledge and Wisdom". Nawa-i-waqt (in Urdu).
- Kamal, Ajmal (16 September 2011). "The making of the modern maulvi". The Express Tribune. Pakistan.
- Mollah, Md. Abdul Majeed (14 March 2021). "Ashraf Ali Thanvi: The legendary scholar of Muslim society formation". Kaler Kantho (in Bengali). Bangladesh.

== Seminars ==
- Husain, Akbar; Rashid, Tabassum (2002). Maulana Ashraf Ali Thanvi's viewpoint on the concepts of normality and abnormality. National Conference on Yoga and Indian Approaches to Psychology. India.

== Websites ==
- Saeed, Ahmed (15 May 2010). "Quaid-e-Azam & Maulana Ashraf Ali Thanvi". Quaid-e-azam Mohammad Ali Jinnah. Archived from the original on 19 October 2022.
- Shabbir, Yusuf (2017). "100 Discourses of Shaykh Ashraf Ali Thanawi". Islamic Portal.

== Other ==
=== Theses ===
- Riyasathullah, Mohamed (2012). Ahadees Kay Urdu Tarajim (PhD) (in Urdu). India: Department of Arabic, University of Madras. p. 88. hdl:10603/295877. Archived from the original on 25 October 2023.

=== Books ===
- Metcalf, Barbara (1990). Perfecting women : Maulana Ashraf ʻAli Thanawi's Bihishti zewar : a partial translation with commentary. Berkeley: University of California Press. ISBN 978-0-520-91331-8. OCLC 43476666.

=== Journals ===
- Sikand, Yoginder (2011). "Deobandi Patriarchy: A Partial Explanation". Economic and Political Weekly. 46 (19): 35–41. ISSN 0012-9976. JSTOR 41152370.
