= Muslim Judicial Council =

Islamic organization based in South Africa

- Location: Cape Town, South Africa.

The Muslim Judicial Council SA (MJC), a non-profit umbrella body of Sunni Islamic clerics in South Africa, is headquartered in Cape Town, South Africa. It was established in 1945 by the Muslim Progressive Society. As of 2009, approximately 150 mosques were affiliated with it.

Yusuf Karaan was head mufti of the council and his son Taha Karaan served the post until his death on 11 June 2021. As of 27 January 2024, Sheikh Riad Fataar Al-Azhari was elected as the President of the Muslim Judicial Council (MJC).

On 1 September 2024, Sheikh Riad Fataar Al-Azhari drew controversy by saying "I am Hamas! Cape Town is Hamas! Viva Hamas! viva". The statement was widely condemned by South African Jewish Board of Deputies who called the comments "deeply disappointing and disturbing".
