= John Mohammed Butt =

English Islamic scholar

- Born: 1950; Trinidad, Trinidad and Tobago
- Other names: John Butt

Philosophical work
- Era: 20th Century
- Region: Muslim Scholar
- School: Deobandi Sunni Islam
- Notable ideas: Co-creator of New Home, New Life

John Mohammed Butt is an Islamic scholar and broadcaster, known as the first Westerner to graduate from Darul Uloom Deoband.

== Early life ==
Born in Trinidad in 1950, Butt spent his early life in Walton-on-Thames, England, and attended boarding school at Stonyhurst College before becoming a hippie and traveling to Pakistan.

== Conversion to Islam and life in Pakistan ==
Arriving in Swat in 1969, he was impressed by the tribal way of life and settled in the area, learning Pashto and Dari (he speaks a total of seven languages).

He converted to Islam in 1970. He studied for eight years at Darul Uloom Deoband in India, graduating in 1984, the only Westerner to do so since its foundation in 1866. In Deoband, he studied under the scholars like Saeed Ahmad Palanpuri. Although he continued to live mainly in Swat, he began spending part of each year as the Muslim chaplain at Cambridge University. He left Swat in 2010 when his house was washed away by floods.

== Broadcasting career ==
In 1993 he worked with the BBC World Service to create a new Pashto and Dari radio soap opera. Loosely based upon the format of The Archers, BBC Radio 4's long-running series, New Home New Life became so popular that it has been credited with influencing the Taliban not to press ahead with plans to outlaw radio.

When the Taliban began to gain influence in Afghanistan and Pakistan, he saw their radical interpretation of Islam to be in conflict with the traditional Islamic tolerance of tribal culture. In response, he established the Pak/Afghan Cross-border Radio Training and Production (Pact) project in 2004, producing the Da Pulay Poray (Across the Border) programme to confront what he saw as Islamic extremism.

He has continued to promote what he sees as 'mainstream' Islam, and has been among those pressing ahead with plans for a new Islamic university in Jalalabad, offering a moderate alternative to radical clerics:

It makes perfect sense. There is currently nowhere in Afghanistan where a young man can do higher Islamic studies. They go to Pakistan, where as we know some of them have become radicalised.
