= Hakim Hammad Usmani =

Indian Unani doctor

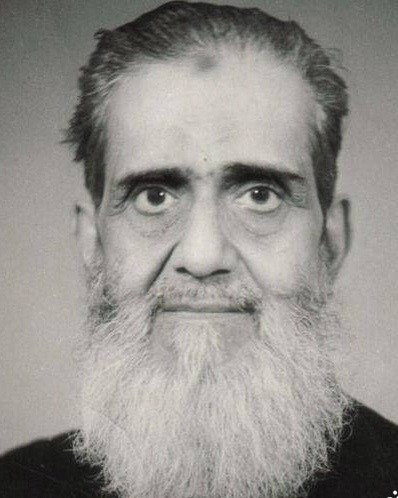
- Born: 20 April 1928; Allahabad, India
- Died: 30 December 2000 (aged 72); Allahabad, India
- Occupation: scholar of unani modern science
- Spouse: Begum Shakeela Khatoon

Hakim Hammad Usmani (20 April 1928 at Allahabad – 30 December 2000) is said to have been the foremost hakim and scholar of Unani medical science of modern times. He has been recognized not only by the state government of Uttar Pradesh but also the government of India. He has been a faculty member of many universities and social and academic organizations. Central Council of Research in Unani Medicine (CCRUM) recognized his efforts by publishing a special Journal on his life and contribution and named it as "Hammad. Usmani Number, Vol. 2. No. 3, January–March, 2001". An article was also dedicated to him in its regular publication "Hammad Usmani – Aik Danishwar Tabib, Jahan-e Tibb."

His father Hakim Ahmad Usmani was awarded the title of Shifa-ul-Mulk (Healer of the Nation) by the Britishers in spite of the known opposition of his family against the British rule in India. His grandfather Allama Hakim Ahmad Hussain founded and established the Unani Medical College, Allahabad in 1904 and managed it from his own resources without raising any donation etc.

Hakim Hammad Usmani Sahib was one of those exceptional individuals who spent their entire lifetime (1928–2000) consolidating, strengthening and rejuvenating the base of Unani System of Medicine. Although qualified in the Modern System of Medicine (Allopathy) as well, he preferred to practice Unani Medicine. He was always dedicated to Unani System by contributing to Unani Pharmacy, Unani Publications, Unani Education etc. In the process he himself came to be recognized as a chapter in Unani History. Ref: Tarikh-e-Tibb (prescribed book for history of Medicine at Chhhatrapati Shahhuji Maharaj University, Kanpur, UP, India.)

Hammad Usmani was a retired principal/superintendent of Unani Medical College & H.A.H.R.D.M. Hospital, Allahabad, and had been the Dean, Faculty of Ayurvedic & Unani Medicine, Kanpur University, Kanpur. Dr. Usmani, was also on the Scientific Advisory Committee of CCRUM of the Ministry of Health and Family Welfare, Govt. of India, and member of Unani Pharmacopea Committee of G.O.I. New Delhi and associated with various government and non-government organizations working for Unani and Ayurvedic medicine in India.

He was also listed in the prominent Who's Who of India, INFA Who's Who for several consecutive years. He served as the personal Unani physician to the Governor of U.P. His Excellency (Late) Mohd. Usman Arif. He is also recognized as a man who established the managed the State Unani Medical College Allahabad, now taken by the State Govt.

Dr. Hammad Usmani had authored several books in Urdu on Unani medicine, which is a valuable contribution to Unani medicine and has produced many Unani scholars scattered all over India and abroad. Dr. Hammad Usmani also founded and established the 'Usmania Academy', Allahabad, from which he got published the books he had authored and compiled. Many such books are declared prescribed books for the course of BUMS at the Indian System of Medicine and Homeopathy

Besides Unani professional institutions, he was also attached to various education and non-Unani Institutions serving the cause of Humanity. He was also associated with Rotary in a big way.

Hakim Hammad Usmani sahib died on 30 December 2000 at Allahabad, leaving behind his widow, Begum Shakeela Khatoon, his five sons ((Late) Dr.Saad Usmani, Shimweel Usmani, Yasmaneel Usmani, Sufyan Usmani, Zeyad Usmani) and five daughters. Hammad Sahib was 72. After his death, his eldest son Dr. Saad Usmani further consolidated the cause he worked for. (Late) Dr. Saad Usmani was himself an Unani physician and had retired on 30 June 2011 as Professor and Principal of State Unani Medical College, Allahabad and Medical Superintendent Hakim Ahmad Hussain Republic Day Memorial Hospital (HAHRDM), Allahabad.
