= Taha Karaan =

South African Muslim scholar and jurist (1969–2021)

Mufti Taha Karaan
- Taha Karaan in 2021
- Title: The Junior Al-Shafi'i

Personal life
- Born: 2 June 1969 Cape Town, South Africa
- Died: 11 June 2021 (aged 52) Cape Town, South Africa
- Parent: Yusuf Karaan (father)
- Education: Darul Uloom Deoband; Cairo University

Religious life
- Religion: Islam
- Founder of: Mahajjah Research Institute; Dar al-Uloom al-Arabiyyah al-Islamiyyah, Strand
- Jurisprudence: Shafiʽi

Taha Karaan (2 June 1969 – 11 June 2021) was a South African Muslim scholar and jurist. He was the head-mufti of the Muslim Judicial Council, South Africa. He was the founder of Mahajjah Research Institute and the Dar al-Uloom al-Arabiyyah al-Islamiyyah in Strand.

== Biography ==
Taha Karaan was born on 2 June 1969, in Cape Town. He was the son of Yusuf Karaan. He memorized the Quran at Waterfall Islamic Institute (Mia's Farm) and went to study at the Darul Uloom Deoband from where he graduated in 1991 with highest grades. He later studied for two years at the Cairo University. His teachers include Saeed Ahmad Palanpuri. Taha followed the Shafiʽi school but held close to the Hanafis and attributed himself to the Deobandism.

Taha was seen as an influential thinker in South Africa. He was honored with the title "ash-Shāfi‘ī as–Sagīr" (The Junior Al-Shafi'i) by Khalil Ibrahim Mula Khatir. In 1996, Taha established Dar al-Uloom al-Arabiyyah al-Islamiyyah (DUAI) in Strand. Under his supervision, the female wing of the DUAI was initiated in 2016 where Taha also served as a course advisor. Taha succeeded his father Yusuf Karaan as the head-mufti of Muslim Judicial Council in 2015. He was the founder and director of Mahajjah Research Institute that he had started in defense of the Companions of the Prophet. He was known throughout South Africa for debating Shias. In early 90s, Azam Tariq regarded Taha Karaan's expertise in refuting the Shias extraordinary. He wrote Fleeing from Fate to Fate: 40 Ahadith on Contagion and Pandemics.

He died on 11 June 2021, from COVID-19 complications. Islamic scholars and intellectuals Abdur Rahman ibn Yusuf Mangera, Faraz Rabbani, Ismail ibn Musa Menk, Omar Suleiman and Yasir Qadhi expressed grief over his death.

== See also ==
- Deobandi movement in South Africa
- List of Deobandis
