= Ashraf Ali Thanwi =

Indian Islamic scholar and Sufi (1863–1943)

Personal details
- Born: Ashraf; 19 August 1863 Thana Bhawan, British India
- Died: 20 July 1943 (aged 79) Thana Bhawan, British India
- Parent: Munshi Abdul Haq (father)
- Education: Darul Uloom Deoband

Personal life
- Main interest(s): Sufism, moral philosophy, Islamic revival, tafsir, fiqh, hadith, prophetic biography
- Notable works: Bayan Ul Quran (1908); Bahishti Zewar; Imdad al-Fatawa; Nashr al-Tib fi Zikr al-Nabi al-Habib (1912)

Religious life
- Religion: Islam
- Denomination: Sunni
- Jurisprudence: Hanafi
- Creed: Maturidi
- Movement: Deobandi

Muslim leader
- Disciple of: Imdadullah Muhajir Makki
- Disciples: Abdul Hai Arifi, Athar Ali Bengali, Abdul Majid Daryabadi, Aziz al-Hasan Ghouri, Abrarul Haq Haqqi, Shah Ahmad Hasan, Muhammadullah Hafezzi, Khair Muhammad Jalandhari, Masihullah Khan, Maqsudullah, Muhammad Shafi, Murtaza Hasan Chandpuri, Habibullah Qurayshi, Sulaiman Nadvi, Shah Abdul Wahhab, Wasiullah Fatehpuri, Muhammad Tayyib Qasmi, Zafar Ahmad Usmani
- Influenced: Muhammad Iqbal, Shabbir Ahmad Usmani, Hakeem Muhammad Akhtar, Badre Alam Merathi

Ashraf Ali Thanwi (often referred as Hakimul Ummat (Note: Spiritual physician of the Muslim Ummah.) and Mujaddidul Millat; (Note: Reformer of the Nation.) 19 August 1863 – 20 July 1943) was an Indian Sunni Muslim scholar, jurist, thinker, reformist and a revivor of classical Sufism in the Indian subcontinent during the British Raj. He was a central figure of Islamic spiritual, intellectual and religious life in South Asia and continues to be highly influential today. He wrote over a thousand works including Bayan Ul Quran and Bahishti Zewar. He was also one of the chief proponents of the Pakistan Movement.

He graduated from Darul Uloom Deoband in 1883 and moved to Kanpur, then Thana Bhawan to direct the Khanqah-i-Imdadiyah, where he resided until his death. His training in Quran, hadith, fiqh studies and Sufism qualified him to become a leading Sunni authority among the scholars of Deoband. His teaching mixes Sunni orthodoxy, Islamic elements of belief and the patriarchal structure of the society. He offered a sketch of a Muslim community that is collective, patriarchal, hierarchical and compassion-based.

== Views and ideology ==
Thanwi was a strong supporter of the Muslim League. He maintained correspondence with the leadership of All India Muslim League (AIML), including Muhammad Ali Jinnah. He also sent groups of Muslim scholars to give religious advice and reminders to Jinnah. His disciples Zafar Ahmad Usmani and Shabbir Ahmad Usmani were key players in religious support for the creation of Pakistan. During the 1940s, many Deobandi Ulama supported the Congress but Thanwi and some other leading Deobandi scholars including Muhammad Shafi and Shabbir Ahmad Usmani were in favour of the Muslim League. Thanwi resigned from Darul Uloom Deoband's management committee due to its pro-Congress stance. His support and the support of his disciples for Pakistan Movement were greatly appreciated by AIML.

== Teaching and Education ==
After completing his education, with the permission of his father and teachers, he went to Kanpur and began teaching at Madrasa Faiz-e-Aam. For fourteen years, he continued to spread knowledge (faiz) there. In 1315 AH, he left Kanpur and returned to his ancestral home in Thana Bhawan. There, he revived the Khanqah of Haji Imdadullah Muhajir Makki and established an educational institution named Madrasa Ashrafiya, where he devoted himself until the end of his life to teaching, spiritual purification (tazkiya-e-nufoos), and social reform.

Upon his return, Haji Imdadullah Muhajir Makki sent him a letter, which stated: "It is better that you have moved to Thana Bhawan. I hope that many people will benefit from you, both outwardly and inwardly. You will restore our madrasa and mosque anew. I pray for you at all times."

== Influence and legacy ==
He produced around 1000 trainees, to whom he permitted for Bay'ah and those spread their influences of Thanwi. Among them are: Sulaiman Nadvi, Shabbir Ahmad Usmani, Zafar Ahmad Usmani, Abdul Hai Arifi, Athar Ali Bengali, Shah Abdul Wahhab, Abdul Majid Daryabadi, Aziz al-Hasan Ghouri, Abrarul Haq Haqqi, Muhammadullah Hafezzi, Khair Muhammad Jalandhari, Masihullah Khan, Muhammad Shafi, Murtaza Hasan Chandpuri, Habibullah Qurayshi and Muhammad Tayyib Qasmi.

Muhammad Iqbal once wrote to a friend of his that on the matter of Rumi's teachings, he held Thanwi as the greatest living authority.

== Books ==
Some of his works are

- Bayān al-Qurʾān (بیان القرآن) – An Urdu commentary (tafsir) of the Qur'an.
- Bahishtī Zewar (بہشتی زیور) – A comprehensive manual on Islamic beliefs, worship, and daily life.
- Ḥifẓ al-Īmān (حفظ الإيمان) – A theological treatise on Islamic creed and the status of prophethood.
- Ādāb al-Muʿāsharat (آداب المعاشرت) – A book on Islamic etiquette, manners, and social conduct.
- Ḥayāt al-Muslimīn (حیات المسلمین) – A manual on living according to Islamic teachings.
- Iṣlāḥ al-Rusūm (اصلاح الرسوم) – A work advocating the reform of un-Islamic customs and social practices.
- Nashr al-Ṭayyib fī Dhikr al-Nabī al-Ḥabīb (نشر الطيب في ذكر النبي الحبيب) – A devotional work on the virtues and remembrance of the Prophet Muhammad ﷺ.
- Al-Qawl al-Jalīl (القول الجلیل) – A treatise on spiritual guidance and Sufi practices.
- Al-Maṣāliḥ al-ʿAqliyyah li al-Aḥkām al-Naqliyyah (المصالح العقلية للأحكام النقلية) – A work discussing the relationship between reason and revealed Islamic law.
- Kalīd-e-Mathnawī (کلیدِ مثنوی) – A commentary and explanatory guide to Maulana Rumi's Masnavi-ye Maʿnavi, highlighting its spiritual and ethical teachings from a Sunni perspective.

== See also ==
- Bibliography of Ashraf Ali Thanwi
- Political views of Ashraf Ali Thanwi
- List of Deobandis
