= Thana Bhawan =

- Town
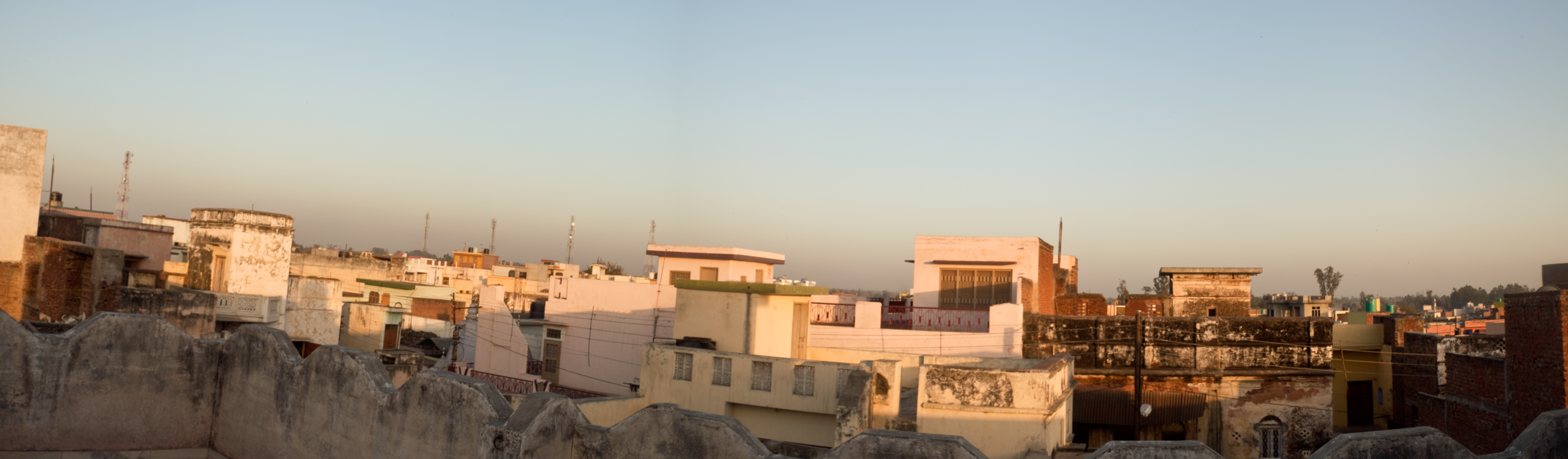

- Location in Uttar Pradesh, India
- Coordinates: 29°35′N 77°25′E
- Country: India
- State: Uttar Pradesh
- District: Shamli

Government
  - Type: Democratic
  - Body: Bhartiya Janta Party

Population (2011)
  - Total: 36,669

Languages
  - Official: Hindi, Urdu
- Time zone: UTC+5:30 (IST)
- Postal code: 247777
- Vehicle registration: UP-19

Thana Bhawan is a town in Shamli district (formerly part of Muzaffarnagar district) in the Indian state of Uttar Pradesh. It was known as Prabuddhnagar first time, when this district came into focus. It is situated on Delhi–Shamli national highway, it is 100 km away from Delhi, 45 km from Saharanpur, 38 km from Muzaffarnagar and 59.6 km away from Panipat (Haryana). Border of this district is connected with district Muzaffarnagar in east and with Haryana in west and with Saharanpur in north and with district Baghpat it is connected in south. It is said that the name Thana Bhawan emerged from the name of Devi Bhawan Temple. In the 18th century it was home to mostly Hindu and Muslims families. It is situated on the Delhi–Saharanpur highway NH 709B around 120 kilometres (75 mi) from Delhi.

== Religions ==
Hindu and Muslim families reside in Thana Bhawan. The ancient Devi Bhawan Temple and other temples like Jassu Wala, Ashram Panchtirthi and Jahar Veer Goga Ji Maadhi are situated here. Every year a grand mela is organised in worship of Gogaji. The town is home to Ashraf Ali Thanwi's house, his grave, madrasa and library. Maulana Fateh Mohammed's house is also situated in Thana Bhawan.

== Education ==
There are five Inter colleges and tuition: Kisan Inter College, Divya Public School, Lala Lajpat Rai Inter College and Lala Lajpat Rai Kanya Inter College. Anand Public School, Arpan Senior Secondary School, Alpine International School, Sanatan Dharm Higher Secondary School, Saraswati Public Junior High School

There is only one college, Chaudhary Atar Singh Degree College, which is affiliated to Chaudhary Charan Singh University, Meerut. It was opened with the objective of providing higher education to the town's people so that they could study in their own town.

== Demographics ==
As of 2001, Thana Bhawan had a population of 31,183. Males constitute 53% of the population and females 47%. Thana Bhawan has an average literacy rate of 47%, lower than the national average of 59.5%: male literacy is 54%, and female literacy is 39%. In Thana Bhawan, 18% of the population is under 6 years of age.

Thana Bhawan is also a UP State Assembly constituency itself, with nearly 240,000 voters.

== Notable personalities ==
- Ashraf Ali Thanwi (1863–1943) was an Indian Islamic scholar of the Deobandi movement. He wrote more than a thousand books.
- Shaukat Thanvi (1904–1963), whose family came from Thana Bhawan, was a Pakistani journalist, essayist, columnist, novelist, short story writer, broadcaster, playwright, humorist and poet. He received the Tamgha-e-Imtiaz Award in 1963 from the President of Pakistan.
- Ehtisham ul Haq Thanvi (1915-1980) was a Pakistani Islamic scholar

== Economy ==
Thana Bhawan is famous for the production of many crops, the main ones being rice, wheat, garlic, onions, potato, and sugarcane. This place is also famous for clothes, garments, grocery and other items markets. The nearby village people come here to purchase daily needs items.

== See also ==
- Shamli
- Ashraf Ali Thanwi
