= Nakhalpara =

Nakhalpara নাখালপাড়া
- Urban area of Dhaka City
- Location in Bangladesh
- Coordinates: 23°45.5′N 90°23.5′E
- Country: Bangladesh
- Division: Dhaka Division
- District: Dhaka District
- City: Dhaka City
- Thana: Tejgaon Thana & Tejgaon Industrial Area Thana
- Local government: Dhaka North City Corporation
- Ward No: DNCC Ward No-25

Area
  - Total: 1.74 km^{2} (0.67 sq mi)

Population (1991)
  - Total: 120,012
  - Density: 25,144/km^{2} (65,120/sq mi)
- Time zone: UTC+6 (BST)
- Postal code: 1215

Nakhalpara Baro Jame Mosjid

Nakhalpara is an area in the capital city Dhaka of Bangladesh. It is located under Tejgaon Thana & Tejgaon Industrial Area Thana Beside South: Kawran Bazar, farmgate & Tejkunipara, North: Shaheen Bag, Arjat para & Mohakhali, East: Mohakhali Inter City Bus-stand, Nabisco Biscuit Factory & Channel I and West: Old Airport Road, Prime minister's Office.

Nakhalpara is divided into two parts by a mixed gauge railway track of Bangladesh Railway; west side of the railway track is called West Nakhalpara and east side is called East Nakhalpara.

Nakhalpara is famous for, it hosts the Nakhalpara Jame Mosjid, Baitun Nur Jame Mosjid, Nakhalpara Baitul Aman Mosjid, Badam Gach Tola (Dram Factory) Nakhalpara Shia Mosque & Mazer Complex, Kuwati Mosjid, Nakhalpara Hossain Ali High School, Nakhalpara Hazrat Belal(R) Mosjid & Madrash Complex, Haji Moron Ali Islamia Kamil Madrasah Complex, Shia Mazar Dhal, Nakhalpara Government Primary School, New Ananda English School, Rose Bud Kindergarten, Nakhalpara Community Center & Nakhalpara Bazar.

Nakhalpara is administered by Dhaka North City Corporation.

Nakhalpara is situated at more or less in the center of Dhaka City surrounded by Prime Minister's Office (Bangladesh), Farmgate, Karwan Bazar (prime Wholesale market in the city), Mohakhali, Tajgaon Industrial Area and Tejgaon railway station. But the neighborhood is not a planned residential area. vicinity was developed by due to its location convenience during 1960-1990 an But the area remained ignored and neglected by Dhaka City Corporation (DCC) for long. Many real estate companies have built hundreds of apartments in this area. The roads and lanes of this area are very narrow.

== Gallery ==
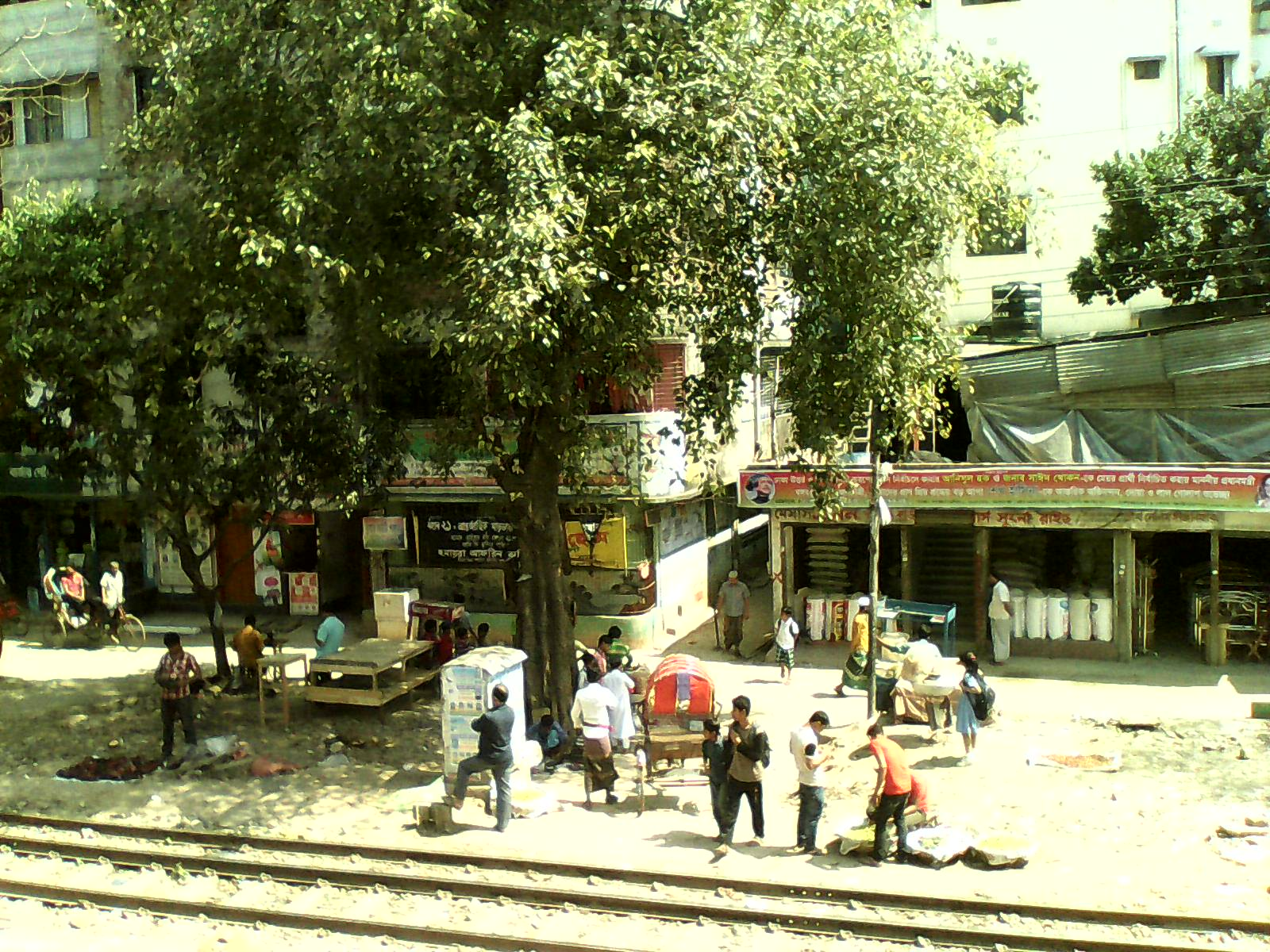
Nakhalpara

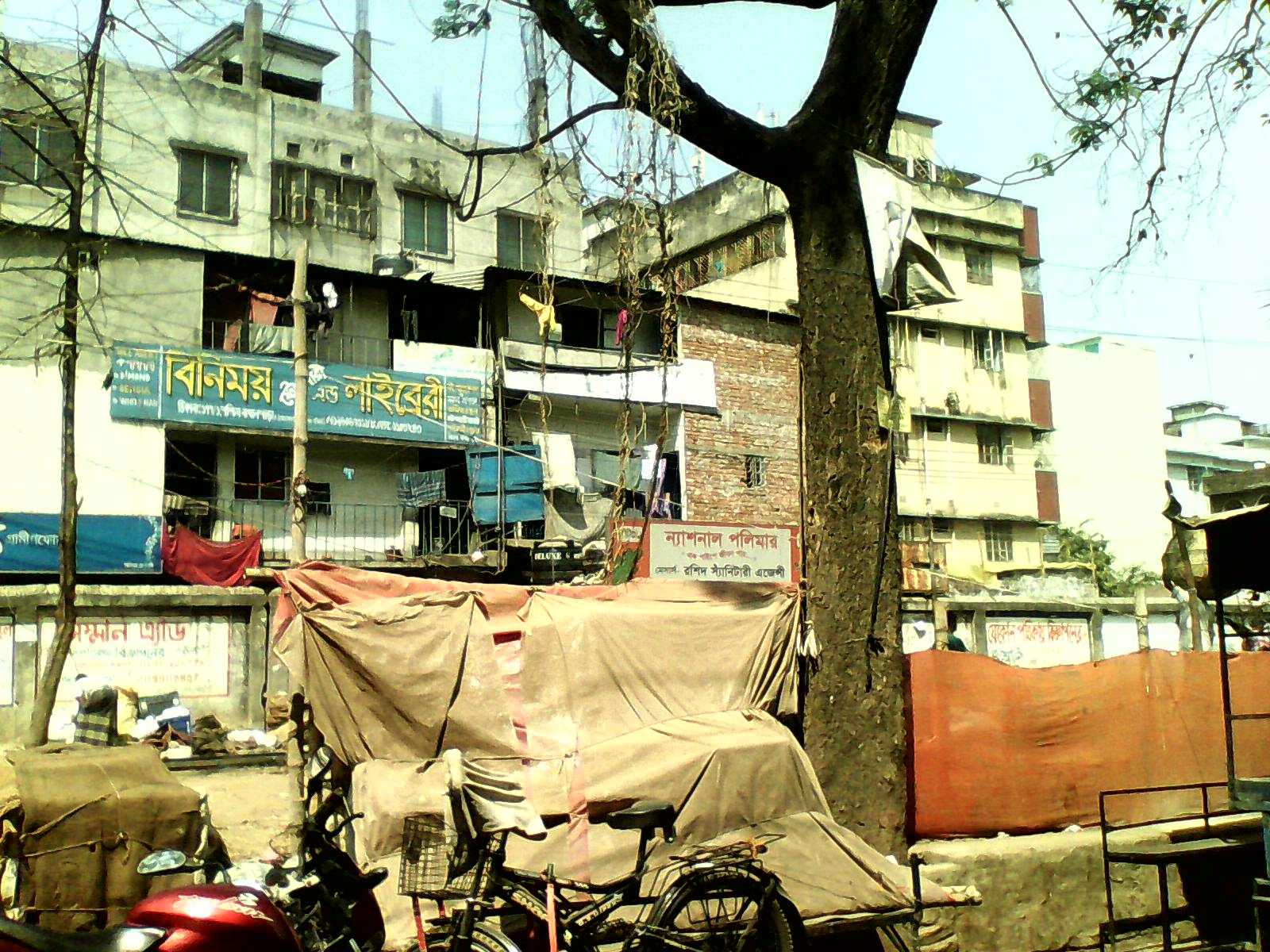
Nakhalpara

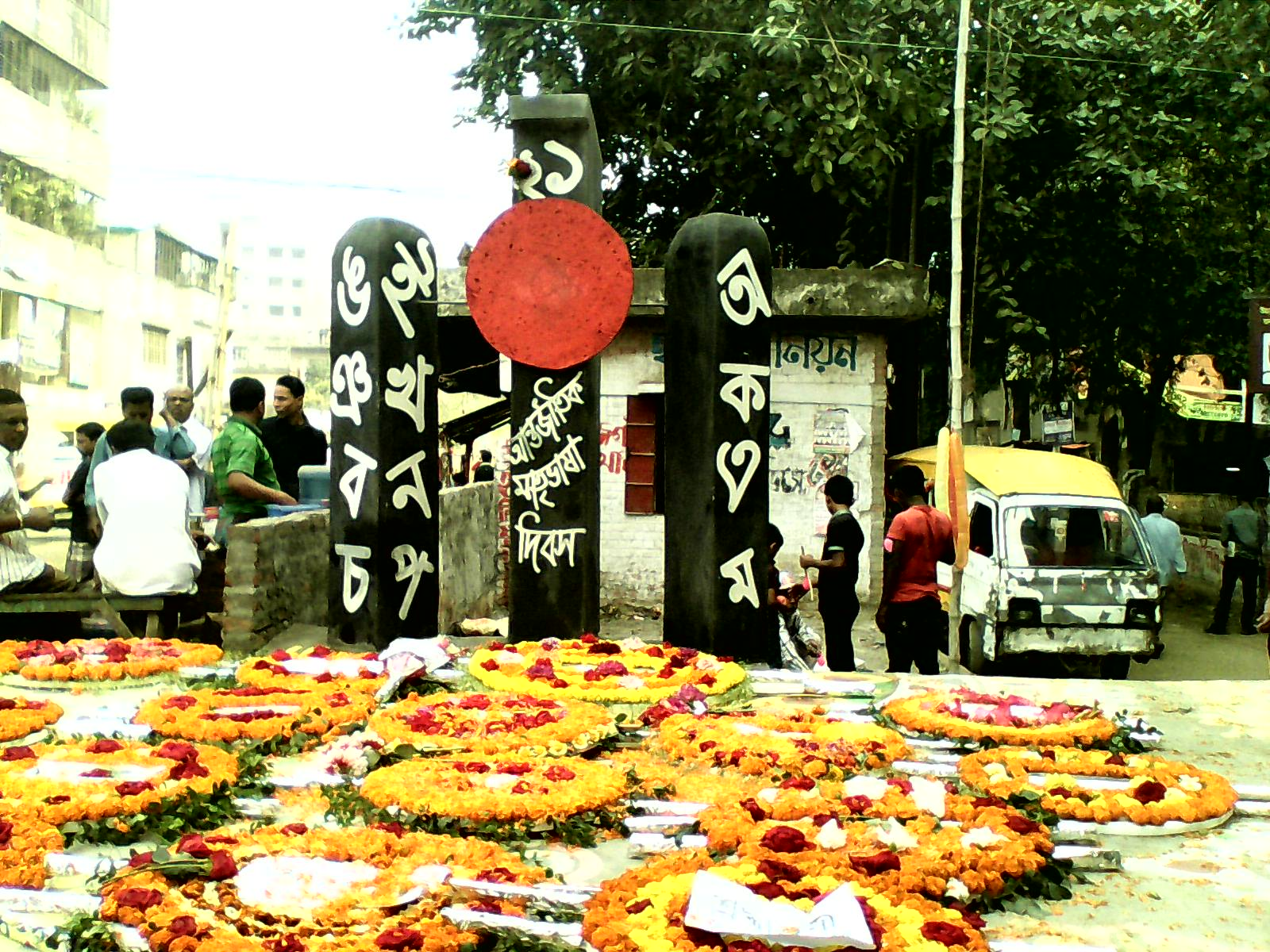
Nakhalpara Sheed Miner

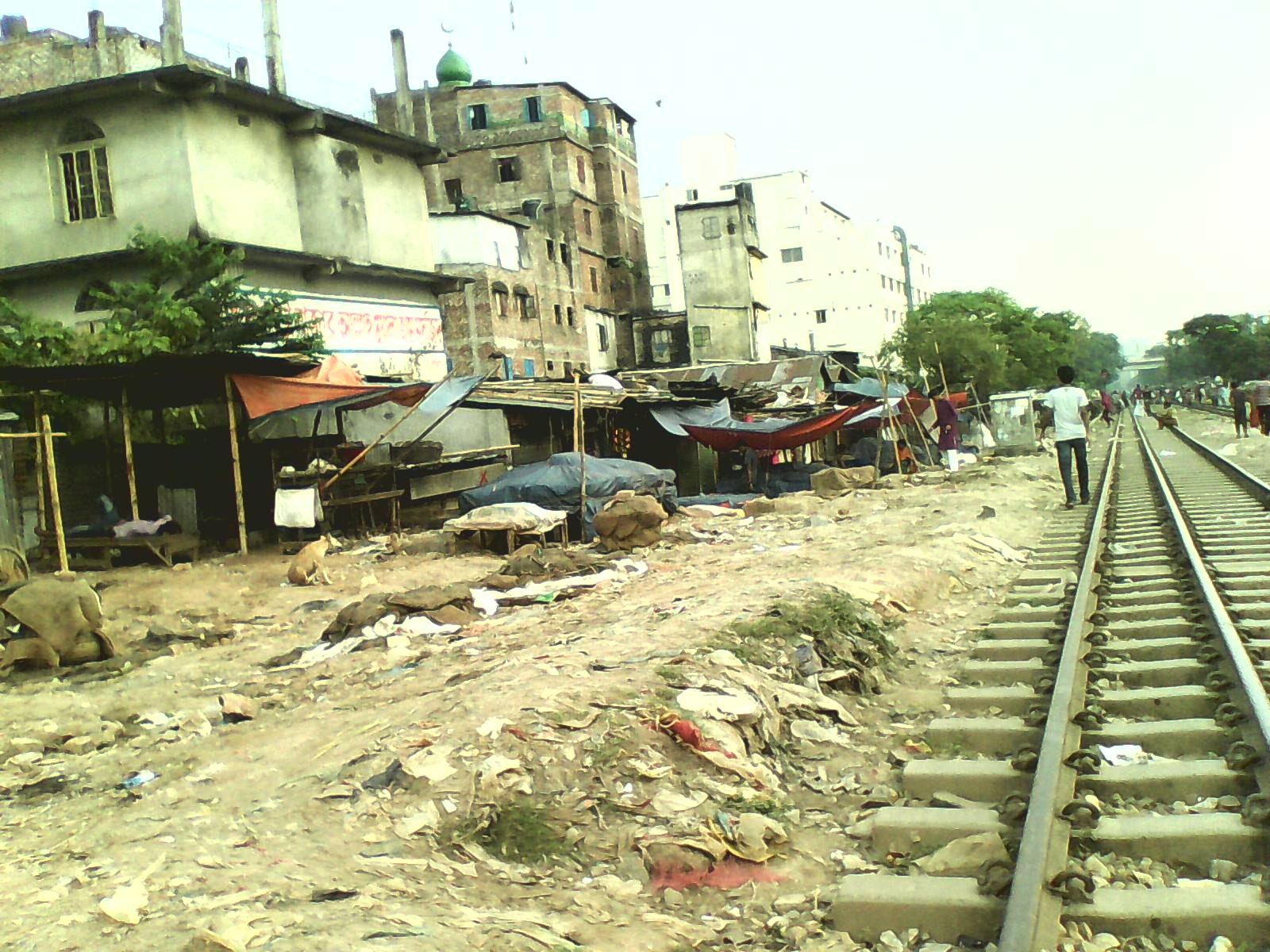
Nakhalpara Bazar

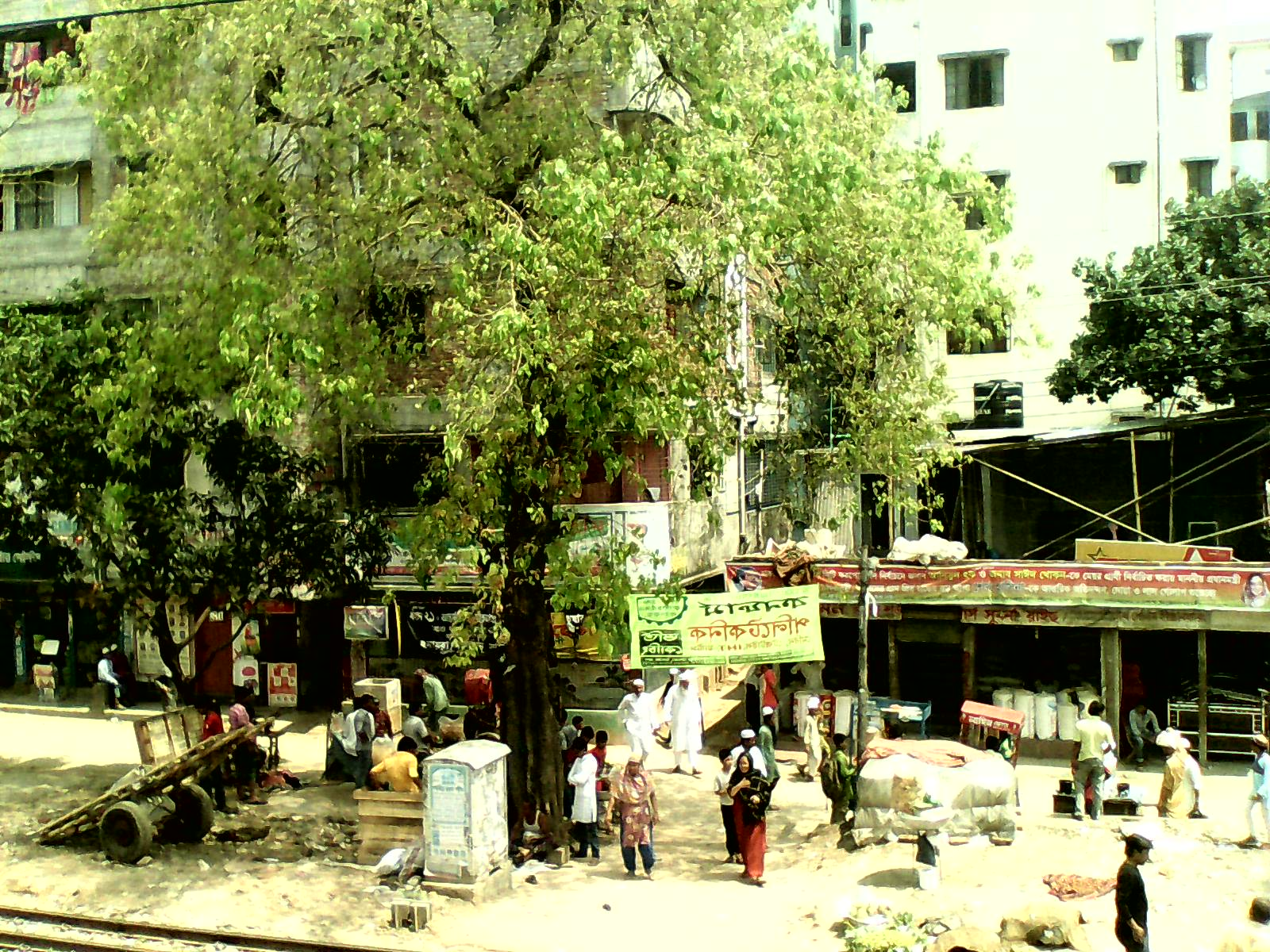
Nakhalpara Railline

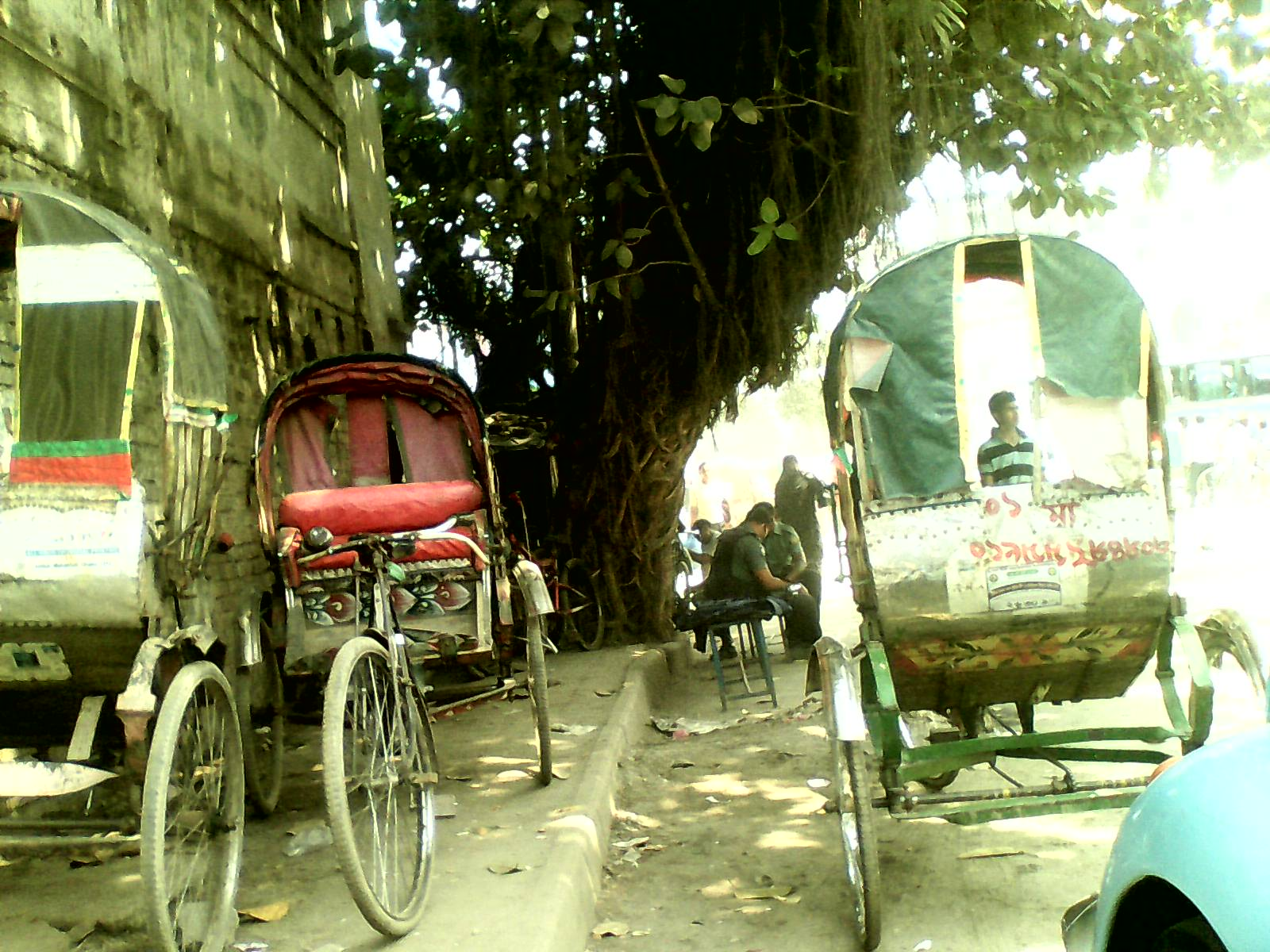
Nabisco More
