= Sweden Aslam =

Bangladeshi gangster

- সুইডেন আসলাম
- Born: Sheikh Mohammad Aslam; 1961 or 1962 (age 64–65)
- Status: On bail

Details
- Span of crimes: 1986–1997
- Country: Bangladesh
- Date apprehended: 26 May 1997
- Imprisoned at: Kashimpur High Security Central Jail

Sheikh Mohammad Aslam (known as Sweden Aslam) is a Bangladeshi gangster who is convicted of 22 cases including 9 murders from the mid-1980s until he was apprehended in 1997.

Aslam was released from Kashimpur High Security Central Jail in Gazipur District on bail on 3 September 2024 after being in prison for 27 years.

== Early life ==
Aslam is originally from Chatiar area under Nawabganj Upazila, Dhaka. His father was Sheikh Jinnat Ali. He lived in Indira Road in Dhaka. He completed his SSC from Tejgaon Polytechnic High School (now Tejgaon Government High School). Being married to Iti, a Swedish expatriate, Aslam got the nickname "Sweden".

== Criminal activities ==
Aslam had control over the several area in Dhaka including Kawran Bazar, Tejturi Bazar, Tejgaon, and Sher-e-Bangla Nagar. He was first accused of killing a teenager, Shakil, at Nazneen School in East Rajabazar.

After the accusation of killing Galib, a Jubo League leader, on 23 March 1997, Aslam was arrested by the police on 26 May from Old DOHS. At that time, Bangladesh Awami League party was in power of Bangladesh government and Jubo League is the youth wing of the party.

Aslam slapped a reporter of ATN Bangla on 31 July 2003 in a court room in front of police officers who laughed at the incident but did not take any action. He was acquitted in an arms case on 3 October 2003. He was cleared in the murder case of Tajgaon resident Mohammad Ali in 18 October. He was sentenced to life imprisonment on 5 November 2003 in an arms case. On 23 June 2004, he was acquitted while Aga Shamim was sentenced to 60 years imprisonment in 1995 murder of three people in Old Dhaka.

Aslam was again arrested on 31 January 2005. In April, he was sentenced to life imprisonment in the 1993 Bipul murder. On 14 On 18 October 2006, he was cleared in another case. In May 2009, he was sentenced to 17 years imprisonment in an arms case filed when he was detained in 1997. He had a total of 14 other cases against him. In 2010, The Daily Star reported despite being in jail extortion in his name was continuing in Tejgaon.

On 3 September 2024, Aslam was released from Kashimpur High Security Central Jail in Gazipur District after the resignation of Sheikh Hasina and collapse of the Awami League government. The Daily Star editorial expressed concern over the release of Aslam and other criminals, such as Freedom Rasu and Killer Abbas, after another recent releasee, Pichchi Helal, was accused in a murder case.
