= Raja Bazar =

Raja Bazar or Rajabazar may refer to:

- Rajabazar, Kolkata, a locality in the city of Kolkata in West Bengal, India
  - Rajabazar Science College, now University College of Science, Technology and Agriculture
- Rajabazar, Jaunpur, a neighborhood of Jaunpur, Uttar Pradesh, India
- Raja Bazaar, a locality in the city of Rawalpindi in Punjab, Pakistan
- East Raja Bazar, a mahalla (neighborhood) in the city of Dhaka, Bangladesh
- West Raja Bazar, a mahalla (neighborhood) in the city of Dhaka, Bangladesh
