= Shaheenbag =

Shaheenbag Bengali: শাহীনবাগ
- Urban area of Dhaka City
- Location in Bangladesh
- Coordinates: 23°46′14″N 90°23′31″E
- Country: Bangladesh
- Division: Dhaka Division
- District: Dhaka District
- City: Dhaka City
- Thana: Tejgaon Thana
- Local government: Dhaka North City Corporation
- Ward No: DNCC Ward No-25

Area
  - Total: 1.39 km^{2} (0.54 sq mi)

Population (1991)
  - Total: 81,012
  - Density: 21,165/km^{2} (54,820/sq mi)
- Time zone: UTC+6 (BST)
- Postal code: 1215

Shaheenbag (Bengali: শাহীনবাগ) is a neighborhood in Tejgaon of Dhaka District in the Division of Dhaka. It is a large area in the centre of Dhaka, the capital of Bangladesh. This is an important area of Dhaka city as prime minister's office is located near it. It is bounded by Mohakhali to the north, Bir Uttam Ziaur Rahman Road to the west, Tejgaon Industrial Area, Kawran Bazar, West Nakhalpara, Tejturi Bazar and Tejkunipara to the south and BAF Shaheen College Dhaka, Dhaka Cantonment to the east.

== Administration ==
Shaheen Bagh is located in Ward No. 25 under Zone-3 of Dhaka City Corporation.

== Mosques ==
- Shaheenbag Central Jame Masjid
- Air Staff Quarter Mosque

== gallery ==
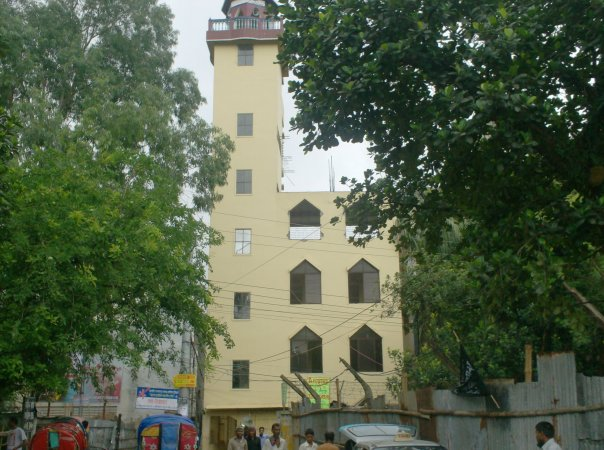
Shaheenbag Central Jame Masjid

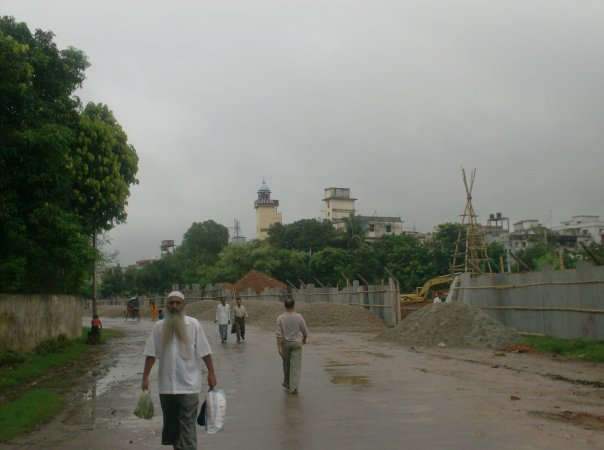
Road in Shaheenbag

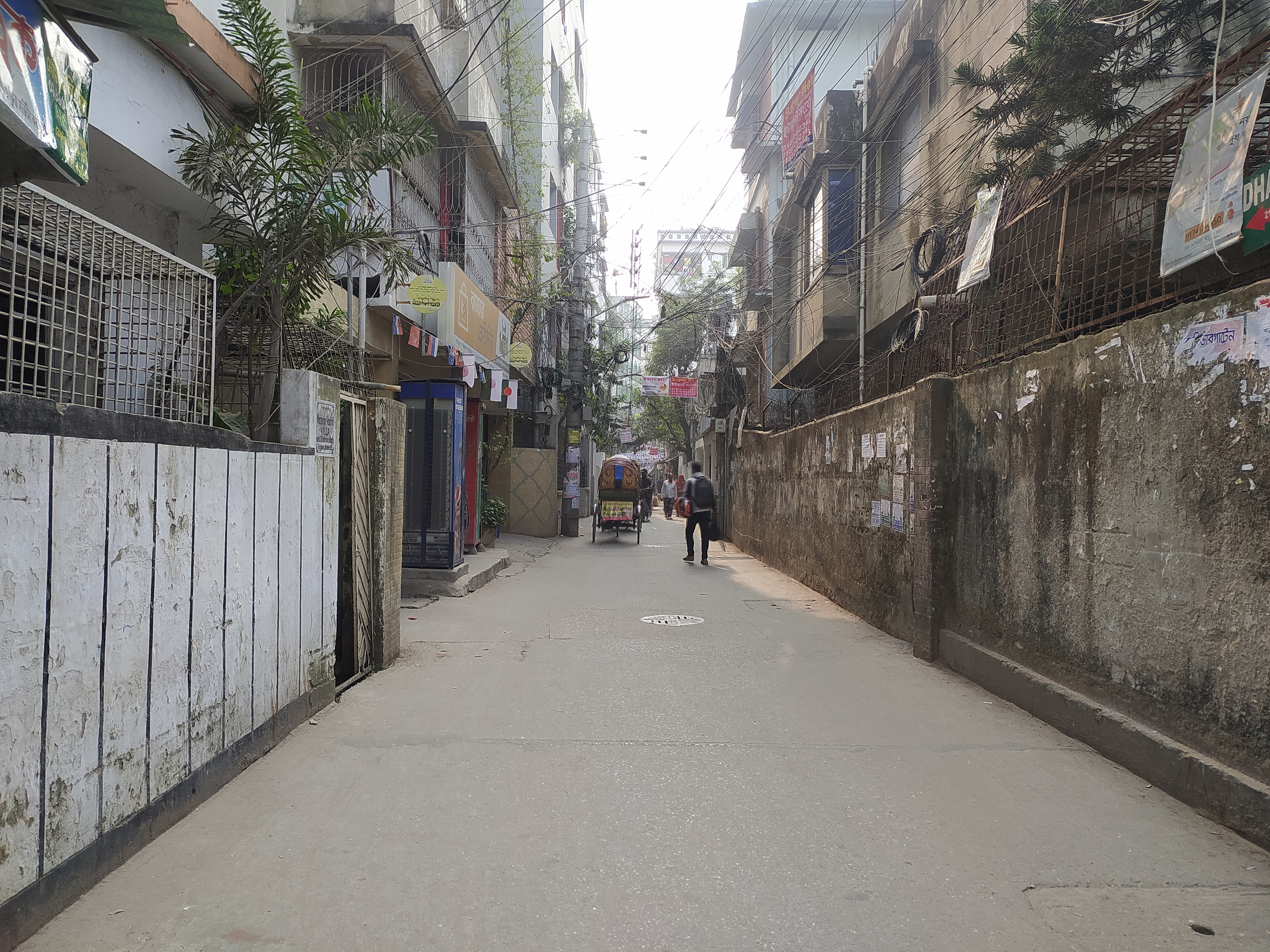
No. 6 Street, Shaheen Bagh, Tejgaon, Dhaka
