= Farmgate =

Neighbourhood in Dhaka, Bangladesh

- Commercial area in Dhaka city
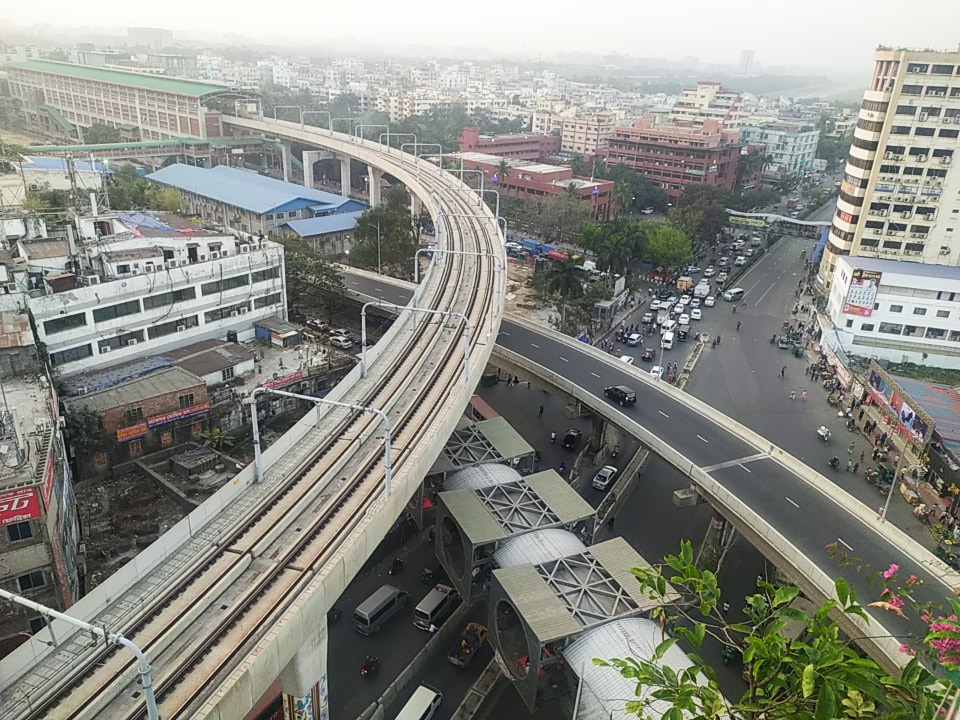
- Farmgate
- Interactive map of Farmgate
- Country: Bangladesh
- City: Dhaka
- Division: Dhaka Division
- Thana: Tejgaon Thana
- Ward No.: Ward No. 27, Dhaka North City Corporation
- Time zone: UTC+6 (BST)
- Postal Code: 1215

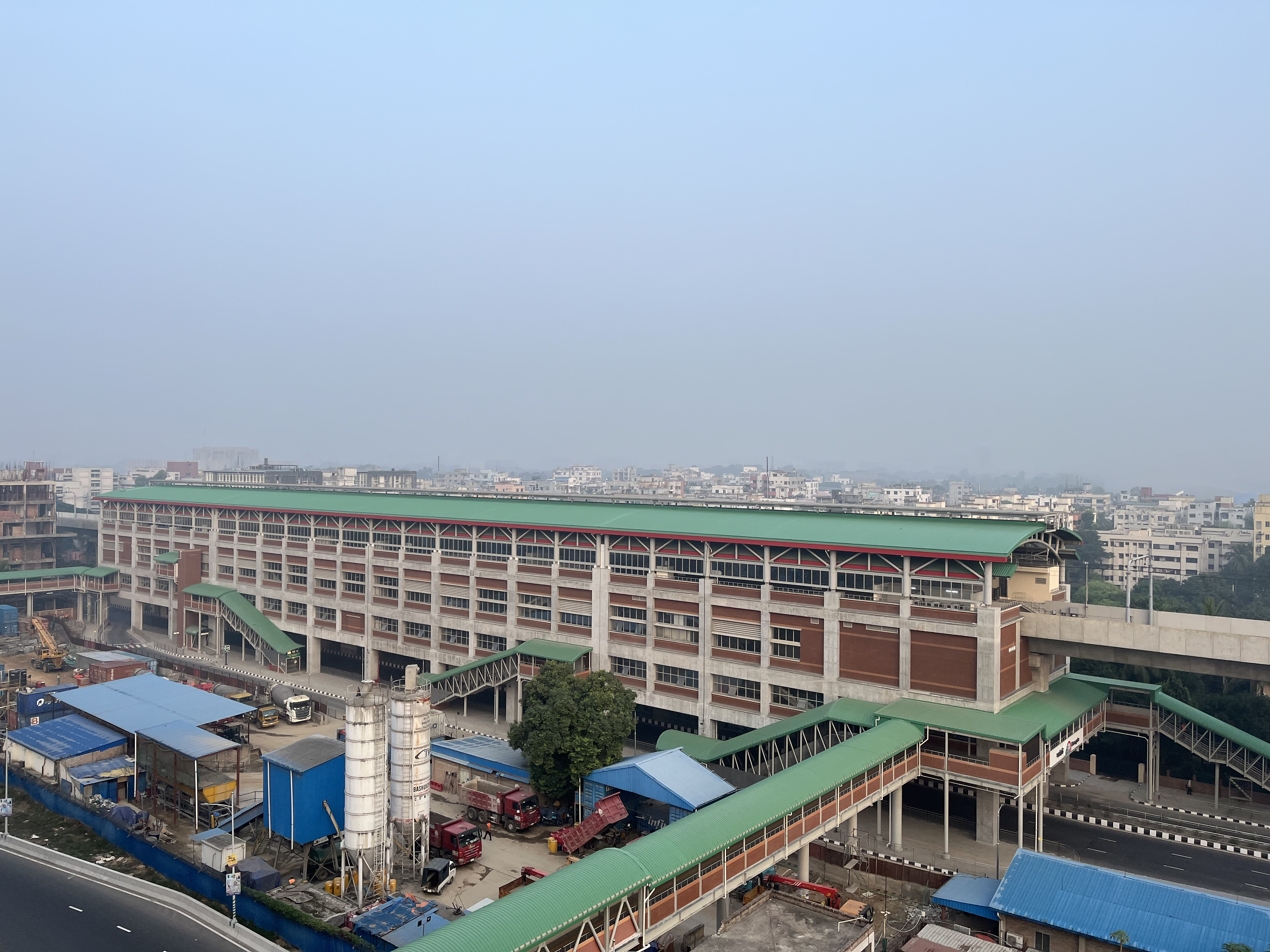
Farmgate Metro Station

Farmgate is an area in Dhaka, the capital of Bangladesh. It is one of the busiest and most crowded areas of the city of Dhaka. Since the early 1990s, the area has seen a massive construction boom. Consequently, the area has gained commercial importance and become one of the major transportation hubs of Dhaka from where anyone can travel to all other parts of the city and throughout the country. Line 6 of the Dhaka Metro Rail has a station there. Today Farmgate has become more of a commercial area than a residential area. Neighboring areas of Farmgate are Shahbagh, Kawran Bazar, Panthapath, National Parliament building, Rajabazar and Bijoy Sarani.

The area is so named because a farm's main gate used to exist here in British era.

== Feature ==
Farmgate is the nerve center of Dhaka city. As a major commercial area of Dhaka, Farmgate serves as one of the significant business hubs of the city. Many Governmental offices, NGOs (Non-Government Organisations), educational institutions and commercial and financial institutions are located at Farmgate. Furthermore, Ananda Cinema Hall, one of the city's popular and traditionally renowned movie theaters, is located here. Green Road is the main street of this area, extending from the Farmgate footbridge to Pantapath. Department of Agricultural Extension, commonly known as Khamarbari, is situated in Farmgate. Traffic congestion is a common scene of Farmgate. As a transportation hub of Dhaka, the area most often remains crowded and thousands of cars, rickshaws, minibusses, buses, trucks remain stranded for even hours in the roads and streets of Farmgate. The majority of the inhabitants of Farmgate work in service industries or businesses. Dhaka's largest sanitary market and Green Supermarket are here. Another highly crowded market, known as Sezan Market is located right beside the Farmgate footbridge. With numerous markets, offices, and immense traffic jams, one can take a glimpse and find the ambiance of Dhaka by going to Farmgate.

== Education ==
There are several educational institutions located at Farmgate. The most renowned include:

- Schools
  - Government Science High School
  - Tejgaon Government High School
  - Tejgaon Government Girls' High School
  - Holy Cross Girls' High School
  - Nazneen School
  - Ideal International School and College
- Colleges
  - Holy Cross College
  - Government Science College
  - Tejgaon College
  - Ideal Commerce College
  - Nazneen College
- Universities
  - University of Asia Pacific
