= Minti =

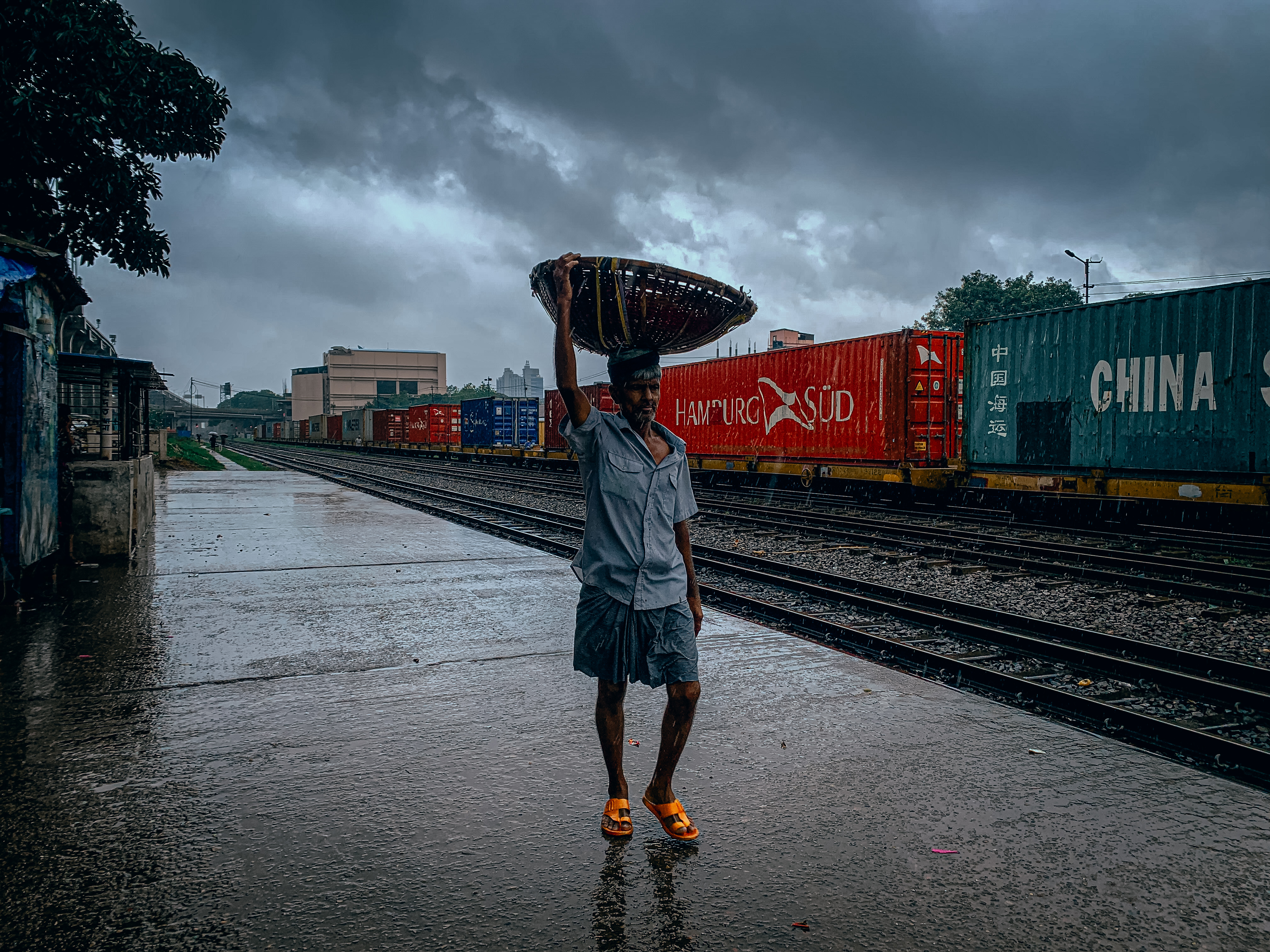
- A Minti at Karwan Bazar carrying a bamboo basket in 2025

Occupation
- Names: মিন্তি
- Synonyms: Tukri carrier, Basket porter
- Pronunciation: মিন্তি
- Occupation type: Manual labor
- Activity sectors: Informal economy, Market logistics

Description
- Competencies: Physical strength, Endurance, Navigation within market
- Education required: On-the-job learning, traditional knowledge
- Fields of employment: Wholesale markets (e.g., Karwan Bazar, Dhaka)
- Related jobs: Market porter, Day laborer

Minti are a labor-based group working in some of Bangladesh's largest wholesale markets. Using bamboo baskets called tukri, they collect goods from the market and deliver them to customers' vehicles or nearby homes. These workers are notably present in Dhaka's largest wholesale market, Karwan Bazar.

Although the term "Minti" typically refers to these workers, some people also use it to describe the baskets they carry.

The work of Minti is physically demanding and based on daily wages. With the rise of modern transportation and technological advancements, this profession is gradually shrinking and is now considered to be on the verge of extinction. Most Minti take up this labor-intensive job due to financial hardship.

== History and background ==
The tradition of renting tukris in Karwan Bazar began in 1990. Initially, workers used their own baskets, but due to risks and maintenance issues, several groups began renting them out. Today, around 5,000 tukris are available under 38 ownership groups. Workers rent them for a fixed daily fee.

The daily rental charge for a tukri is about 30 taka, and workers must also deposit an advance. Each basket is rented for 24 hours, but the full rental is charged even for shorter use.

Minti are essentially floating laborers. Most do not have permanent housing and spend the night near market storage areas. Although their daily income ranges from 600 to 1,000 taka, a significant portion goes toward food, transport, and shelter.

They usually work from 4 a.m. to 5 p.m., earning money by carrying goods for customers, loading them onto rickshaws, and more. Their bamboo baskets are used to transport a variety of goods, including vegetables, fish, and groceries.

=== Tukri business ===
Tukri (bamboo basket) traders source bamboo and craft or repair the baskets themselves. The average construction cost for one tukri is around 900 taka. Regular use means about 50 baskets need to be rebuilt or repaired each month, adding to maintenance expenses. The rental system brings substantial monthly income for owners, while most workers depend on it for their livelihood.

=== Social and economic impact ===
Minti workers play a key role not just in goods transportation but also in keeping wholesale markets functioning smoothly.

In 2020, the COVID-19 pandemic significantly affected their livelihoods. A drop in customer numbers and supply led to their income falling by more than half. During the pandemic, Minti faced severe hardship due to lack of food, shelter, and financial stability.
