= East Nakhalpara =

- Residential area
- Location in Bangladesh
- Coordinates: 23°46′13″N 90°23′51″E
- Country: Bangladesh
- Division: Dhaka
- District: Dhaka
- Local government: Tejgaon Thana & Tejgaon Industrial Area Thana
- Thana: Tejgaon
- Time zone: UTC+6 (BST)
- Poster Code: 1215

East Nakhalpara is name of a place at Tejgaon in Dhaka city. Its eastern part is on Nakhalpara. Thousands of people live here. People of all spheres live here.
