= Government Science High School =

- গবর্নমেন্ট সায়েন্স হাই স্কুল
- Logo of the Government Science High School

Location
- Tejgaon; Dhaka, 1215; Bangladesh; 23°45′29″N 90°23′31″E

Information
- Other name: Government Science College Attached High School
- School type: Public Public
- Motto: Bengali: ●সংস্কৃতি ●প্রতিশ্রুতি ●যোগাযোগ ●উন্নতি (English: ●Culture ●Promise ●Communication ●Progress)
- Established: 1954
- Founder: Government of Bangladesh
- Headmaster: Rahima Akter
- Faculty: Science
- Grades: 1-10th
- Gender: Male
- Student to teacher ratio: 42:1
- Language: Bengali
- Classrooms: 105
- Campus size: 9.00 acre
- Campus type: Urban
- Colour: White Navy Blue
- Athletics: Track and field
- Sports: Football, cricket, badminton
- Accreditation: Board of Intermediate and Secondary Education, Dhaka
- Yearbook: Shikriti
- Website: gshs.edu.bd

Government Science High School is a public educational institution located at Tejgaon in Dhaka, Bangladesh. It is one of the 24 public schools in Dhaka.

== History ==
In 1954, East Pakistan Government 'experimentally' established 4 Technical High Schools in Pakistan. Govt. Technical High School, Tejgaon was one of them. In 1962, the school was upgraded to intermediate college. In 1991, the Government of Bangladesh started a double shift at 62 secondary schools, and Government Science High School was one of them. At that time it was named Govt. Science College Attached High School. But the name was changed to just Government Science High School on 24 December 2019. Those who served as the position of headteacher -

- Rizia Khatun - 1996-1997
- Muhammad Habibullah Khan - 1998-1999
- Muhammad Abdul Aziz - 1999-2000
- Rowshon Aara Begum - 2000-2006
- Muhammad Abdul Aziz - 2006-2011
- Ruhidash Sharkar (In-charge) - 2011-2011
- Muhammad Insan Ali - 2011-2012
- Kasturi Dutta Majumdar (In-charge) - 2012-2015
- Muhammad Bahauddin - 2015-2015
- Kasturi Dutta Majumdar (In-charge) - 2015-2015
- Rowshon Akhter - 2015-2015
- Kasturi Dutta Majumdar (In-charge) - 2015-2016
- Azahar Uddin Ahmed - 2017–2019
- Rahima Akter - 2019–Present

== Daily assembly ==
Daily assembly plays a role to raise discipline, unity and loyalty. This is why, 15 minutes of starting everyday classes, a daily assembly holds for both shifts individually. A daily assembly contains Quran recitations, uptake The National Flag of Bangladesh, repetition of The Oath, serving the National Anthem of Bangladesh and some physical exercises. Everyone has to take part in daily assembly every day.

== Uniform ==
From grades 1-3, the uniform is white shirts and navy blue shorts or full-length pants. From grades 4-10, the uniform is full-sleeve or half-sleeve white shirts and navy blue full-length pants. White school shoes are mandatory for each and every student. For all grades, the embroidered monogram which is given by the school must be attached to the left pocket of the shirt. Both shifts have their individual monogram. Morning shift's monogram has the title 'প্রভাতি' which means morning and Day shift's monogram has the title 'দিবা' which means day. The most essential thing for every student is their own individual ID card which is provided by the school every year.

== School magazine ==
Name of the School Magazine is Shikriti (Bengali: স্বীকৃতি) and the editor is Mr. Ramjan Mahmud. The magazine is published every 2-year intervals. In those 2 years, the contents of the magazine are collected from each and every class. Contents are like - Poetry and rhymes, articles, stories, jokes and riddles, drawings, etc. Selected contents are published.

== School song ==
=== তাল-কাহারবা ===
Bengali:

কথা, সুর এবং স্বরলিপি
প্রমীলা জেসমিন
সহকারী শিক্ষিকা
আমরা বিজ্ঞান স্কুলের ছাত্ররা
লেখাপড়া করবোই করব
মানুষের মত মানুষ হব
আঁধার থেকে আলোর পথে এগিয়ে যাব
মানুষের সেবা করব
দেশকে ভালবাসবো।
এসো সবাই মিলে, এক হয়ে হাতে হাত রাখি,
একটি শক্তিশালী, আদর্শ রাষ্ট্র গড়ি
দেশের একতা রাখবো
সংহতি বুকে বাঁধবো
হবেই জয়, আমাদের জয়, জয় হবে।

== Scout ==
Scouts is one of the most renowned co-curricular activities of Government Science High School. This team has very regular participation in Scout and Cub Scout activities including National Scout Jamboree. In 2004, a student from this institution was awarded the President's Scout Award, the highest award for Scouts. K.M.Shakrat Ullah has been awarded the President's Scout Award in 2021 and had achieved the 'Shapla Cub Award'.

== Committees ==
There are 9 committees to maintain the school properly. And here is a list of those committees.

1. High Table
2. Discipline Committee
3. Tiffin Committee
4. Cultural Committee
5. Sports Committee
6. Magazine Committee
7. Milad and Mosque Committee
8. Cleanliness Committee
9. Student Welfare Fund

== See also ==
- Government Science College, Dhaka
