= Tejkunipara =

Tejkunipara is a neighborhood in Tejgaon Thana of Dhaka city. It is close to the Farmgate neighborhood. Thousands of people live here. All kinds of people live here with different professions.

== Location ==
Its geographical coordinates are 23° 46' 0" North, 90° 25' 0" East. It is closer to the Farmgate area. Monipuri para is located westward, West Nakhalpara is Northward and Farmgate is southward.

== Bank ==
Many important banks like Sonali Bank and Janata Bank have outlets in Tejkunipara.

== Education ==
Over the last fifty years, Tejkunipara has been the home of many renowned schools and colleges, like Holy Cross Girls' High School; Holy Cross College, Government Science College, Bottomley Home Girls' High School, and Tejgaon Government High School.

== Important structures ==
- Holy Rosary Church
- Pir-Ma Mosque
- Bottomley Home Orphanage
