= Kashimpur Central Jail =

Major prison in Bangladesh

- Interactive map of Kashimpur Central Jail
- Location: Kashimpur, Gazipur Sadar Upazila, Gazipur District; 24.0040°N 90.3142°E
- Status: Operational
- Security class: Maximum
- Opened: 2001; 25 years ago
- Managed by: Bangladesh Jail
- Director: Aminul Islam
- Website: prisonkashim1.gazipur.gov.bd; prisonkashim2.gazipur.gov.bd

Kashimpur Central Jail (Bengali: কাশিমপুর কেন্দ্রীয় কারাগার), also known as Kashimpur Prison or Kashimpur Jail, is a major high-security correctional facility located at Kashimpur Union in the Gazipur District of Bangladesh. It is one of the largest and best-known prisons in the country, as well as one of the biggest prisons in Asia.

It was originally constructed in 2001 as an expansion to Dhaka Central Jail. Kashimpur Jail comprises two separate complexes, known as Kashimpur Central Jail-1 and Kashimpur Central Jail-2. These complexes are situated adjacent to each other and are often collectively referred to as Kashimpur Central Jail. The two complexes house both male and female prisoners.

Kashimpur Central Jail-1 primarily detains male inmates. Although Kashimpur Central Jail-2 is primarily designated for female prisoners, it houses male inmates as well. It has condemned cells, where convicts who are awaiting execution are kept. Both complexes have separate sections for different categories of prisoners, including those awaiting trial, convicted prisoners, and prisoners with special circumstances. It also holds foreign prisoners. The jail facilitates and executes death sentences by hanging.

== Administration ==
- Superintendent: Main Uddin (as of September 2024)

== History ==
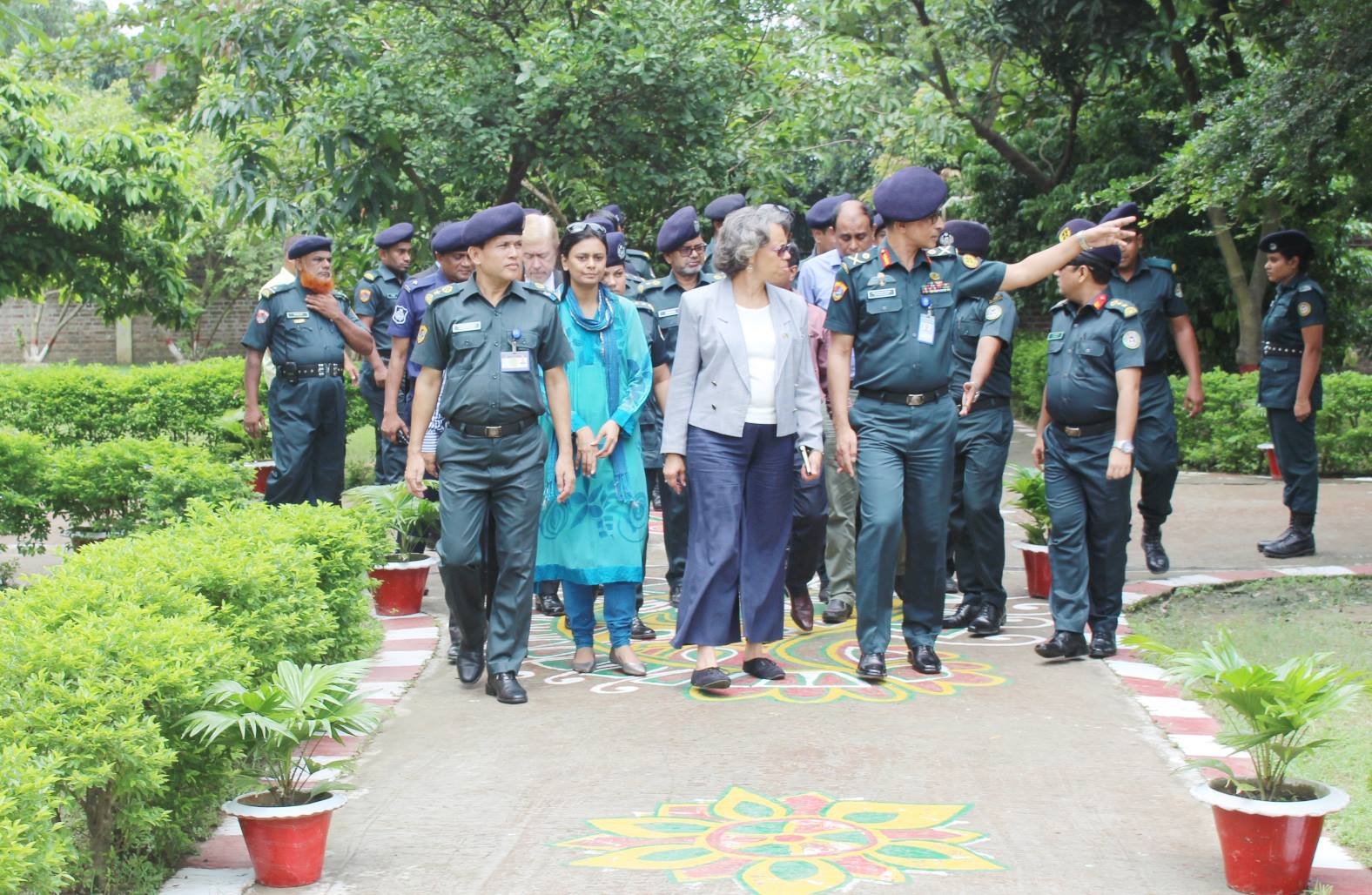
US Ambassador to Bangladesh, Marcia Bernicat, in Kashimpur Jail (2017)

In August 2020, an inmate, Abu Bakar Siddik, of the Kashimpur Central Jail-2 in Gazipur, escaped prison using a self-made ladder. He exited through the main gate of the Brahmaputra Bhaban. The investigation committee found jail officials had shown negligence. The jail superintendent Jahanara Begum had her salary suspended for a year and later transferred to the Mymensingh jail as the superintendent.

During the 2024 Bangladesh non-cooperation movement, 209 prisoners scaled the walls and fled from the prison on 6 August 2024. During the escape, the security guards fired shots and killed 6 prisoners, including 3 militants convicted over the 2016 Holey Artisan Bakery attack. Later, Senior Jail Superintendent Subrata Kumar Bala was withdrawn in connection with the escape, and he was replaced by Main Uddin. Rapid Action Battalion arrested Emdadul Haque, a death row convict, 27 days after the escape.

== Notable inmates ==
- Mir Quasem Ali, a war criminal executed in 2016
- Motiur Rahman Nizami, a war criminal executed in 2016
- Sweden Aslam, a gangster, during 2014–2024
