= West Rajabazar =

Coordinates: 23.7549°N 90.3815°E

West Rajabazar is a mahallah (neighborhood) in Ward 27 of Tejgaon Thana, Dhaka city, Bangladesh. According to the 2011 Bangladesh census, it had 4,493 households and a population of 22,397.
