= Tejgaon Government Girls' High School =

- তেজগাঁও সরকারি বালিকা উচ্চ বিদ্যালয়
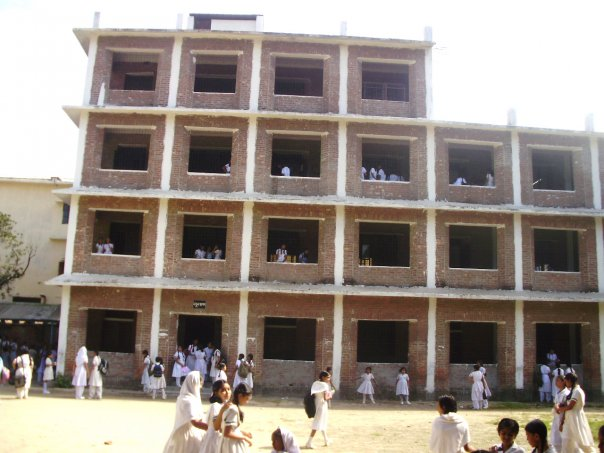
- Tejgaon Government Girls' High School

Location
- Tejgaon; Dhaka; Bangladesh; 23.7583°N 90.3917°E

Information
- Established: 1955
- School board: Dhaka Education Board
- School code: 1264
- Gender: Girls

Tejgaon Government Girls' High School is located in Dhaka, Bangladesh. It was founded in 1955, making it one of the oldest public schools in Dhaka. The school runs from first grade to tenth grade, and prides itself on helping families to educate their children at little or no cost. It is administrated by the Dhaka Education Board.

== Academic performance ==
Tejgaon Government Girls' High School's results from 2007 to 2010 for the Secondary School Certificate level examinations are as follows:

Year	Number of Examinees	Number of Passed Students	Pass Percentage
2007	249	220	88.35%
2008	219	213	97.26%
2009	232	220	94.83%
2010	199	197	98.99%

== Gallery ==
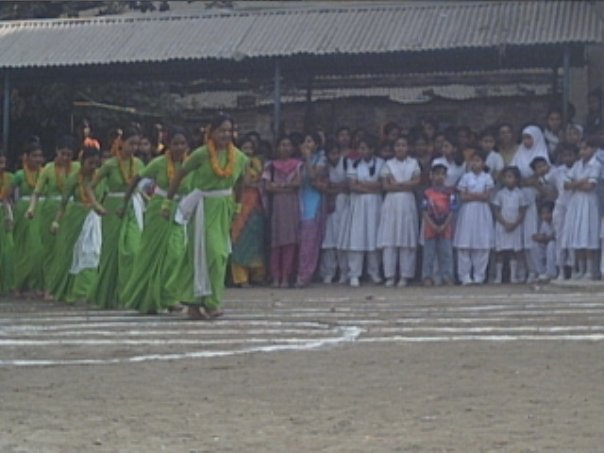
Tejgaon Girls School

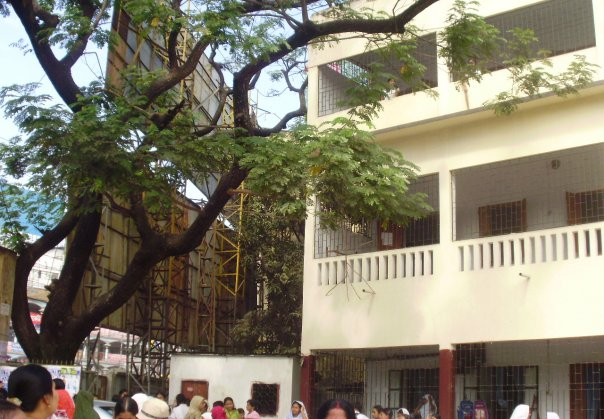
Tejgaon Government Girls High School

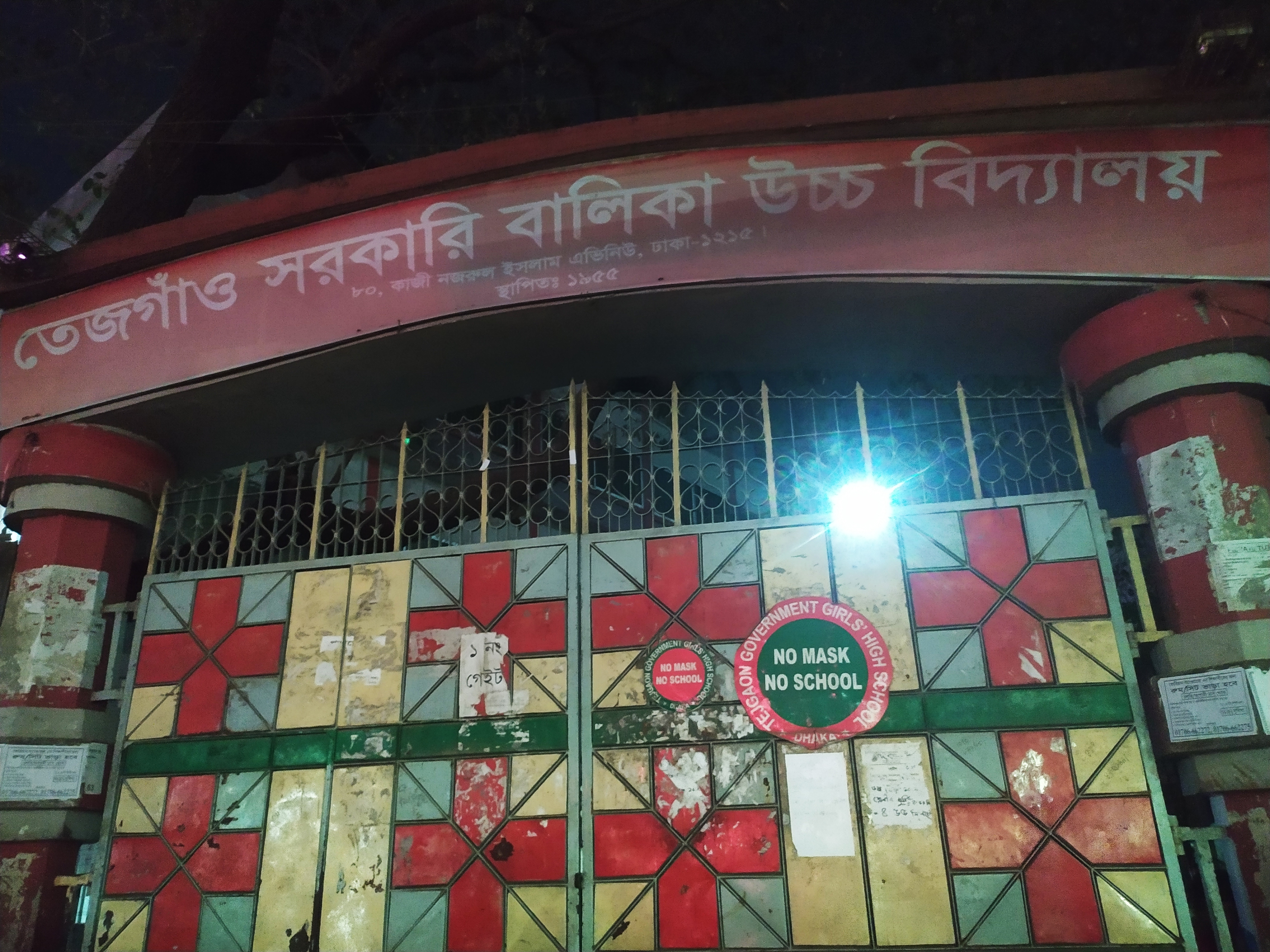
Tejgaon Government Girls' High School main gate
