= Rajabazar, Jaunpur =

Coordinates: 25°53′52″N 82°19′13″E

- Interactive map of Rajabazar, Jaunpur
- Founder: Durgvansh Dikhit Rajput
- Named for: Raja of Dikhit Durgvansh

Rajabazar is a village in Jaunpur, Uttar Pradesh, India.
