= Tejgaon Thana =

Thana in Dhaka North City Corporation, Bangladesh

Tejgaon Thana তেজগাঁও থানা
- Thana
- Aerial view of Tejgaon's skyline.
- Expandable map of vicinity of Tejgaon Thana
- Location of Tejgaon Thana within Dhaka Location of Tejgaon Thana within Dhaka Division Location of Tejgaon Thana within Bangladesh
- Coordinates: 23.76395°N 90.39172°E
- Country: Bangladesh
- Division: Dhaka Division
- District: Dhaka District
- Established as a thana: 1947

Area
  - Total: 2.74 km^{2} (1.06 sq mi)
- Elevation: 23 m (75 ft)

Population (2022)
  - Total: 123,157
  - Density: 54,108/km^{2} (140,140/sq mi)
- Time zone: UTC+6 (BST)
- Postal code: 1215

Tejgaon (Bengali: তেজগাঁও) is a thana of Dhaka District in the Division of Dhaka, Bangladesh. It is in the centre of Dhaka, the capital. In 2006, the boundaries of the thana were redrawn when Tejgaon Industrial Area Thana was created out of the former larger area and again in 2009, when Sher-e-Bangla Nagar Thana was created.

This is an important area of Dhaka city as the prime minister's office is here. It is bounded by Mohakhali to the north, Old Airport Road to the east, Moghbazar-Malibagh to the south and Dhanmondi to the west. It consists of several localities, including Tejgaon Industrial Area, Kawran Bazar, Nakhalpara, Shaheen Bag, Arjat para, East Raja Bazar, West Raja Bazar, Tejturi Bazar, Monipuripara and Tejkunipara.

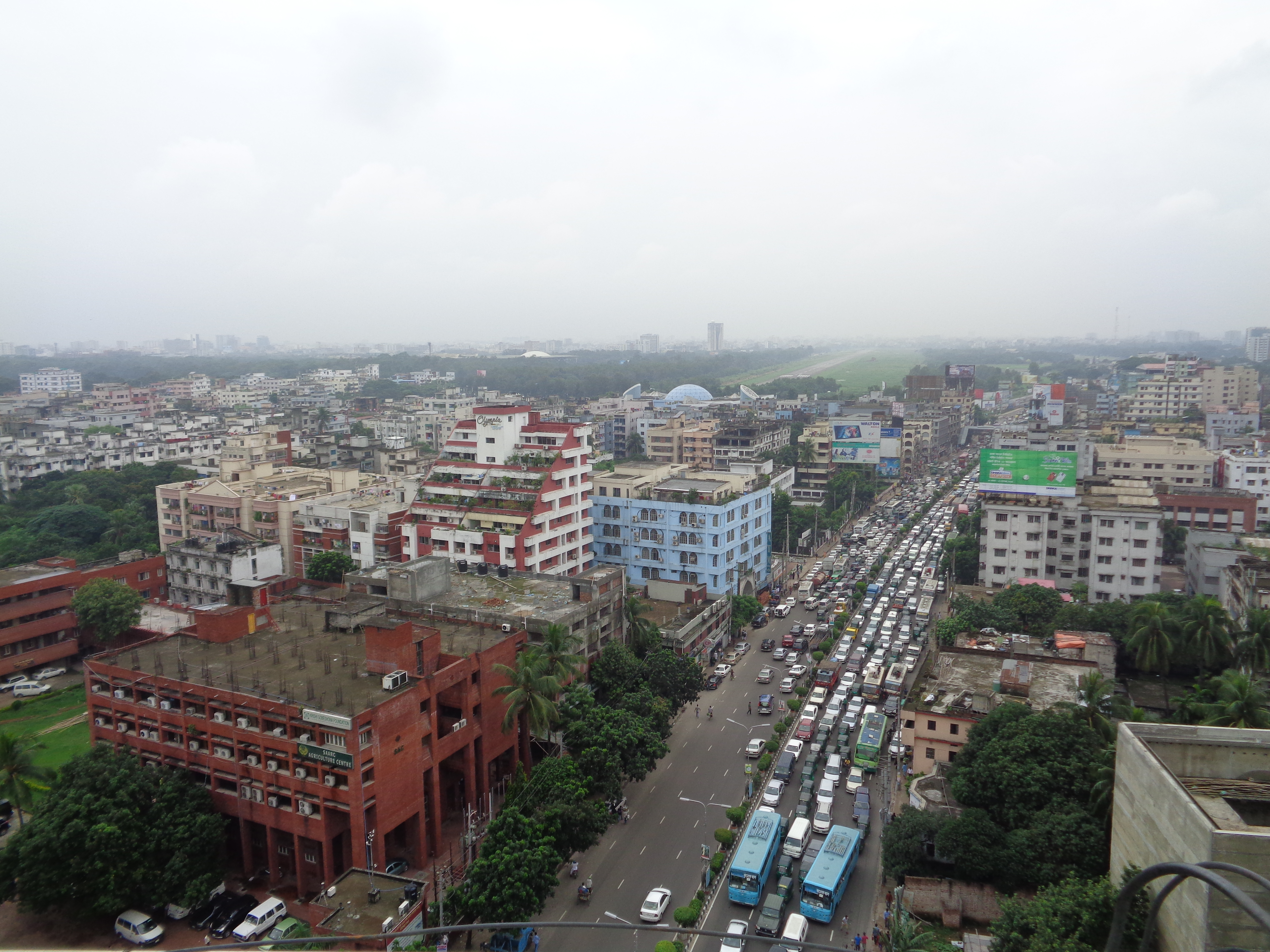
A sky view of Farmgate to Bijoy Sarani

== Geography ==
Tejgaon Thana is bounded by Kafrul Thana, Cantonment Thana and Tejgaon Industrial Area Thana on the north, Kalabagan Thana and Ramna Thana on the south, Tejgaon Industrial Area Thana on the east and Sher-e-Bangla Nagar Thana and Kafrul Thana on the west.. The total area is 2.74 square kilometres (1.06 mi^{2}).

== Demographics ==
Religions in Tejgaon Thana (2022)
Religion	Percent
Islam	91.76%
Hinduism	5.12%
Christianity	2.83%
Other or not stated	0.28%

According to the 2022 Bangladeshi census, Tejgaon Thana had 30,198 households and a population of 123,160. 5.77% of the population were under 5 years of age. Tejgaon had a literacy rate (age 7 and over) of 89.07%: 90.53% for males and 87.04% for females, and a sex ratio of 135.06 males for every 100 females.

According to the 2011 Census of Bangladesh, Tejgaon Thana had 29,622 households and a population of 148,255, 100% of whom lived in urban areas. 6.3% of the population was under the age of 5. The literacy rate (age 7 and over) was 77.6%, compared to the national average of 51.8%.

== Urban layout ==
Historically, the area has been a centre of industrial activity in the city. Numerous plants and factories are in Tejgaon, in such diverse industries as garments, food processing, metal works, pharmaceuticals, etc. Indeed, the names of places in Tejgaon indicate as much:

- Nabisco junction (named after the Nabisco biscuit factory)
- Tibet bus stop (named after a famous cosmetics manufacturer)
- Rahim Metal Mosque
- MP Hostel
- Technical Teachers Training College (TTTC)
- Bashundhara City
- Bangladesh Water Development Board (পানি ভবন)
- Novo Theatre, Dhaka (scientific attraction)

== Economy ==
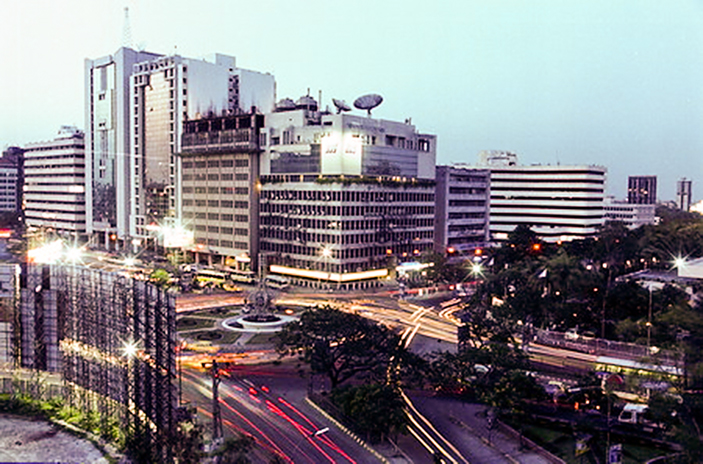

Tejgaon has emerged as an important business district of Dhaka. The first five-star hotel of Bangladesh, Pan Pacific Hotel Sonargaon, is in Kawran Bazar, Tejgaon. The main offices of the Daily Prothom Alo, the Daily Star (Bangladesh), The Independent, and several other newspapers are here. Also, the office and studio of television channels Ekushey Television, NTV, ATN Bangla, Boishakhi TV, Channel i and Channel 1 are at Tejgaon. The main campus of Ahsanullah University of Science and Technology is here as well.

Tejgaon has the headquarters for the Trading Corporation of Bangladesh and the headquarters of ACI Limited.

=== Banks ===
Almost every bank operating in Bangladesh has an outlet in Tejgaon. Foreign banks such as Citi, HSBC and Standard Chartered have branches here, with HSBC and Standard Chartered having multiple ATM booths in the area. Local banks like BRAC Bank, United Commercial Bank PLC., AB Bank, Dutch Bangla Bank, Jamuna Bank have branches. ICICI Bank Ltd., second largest bank of India, has a representative office in UTC building next to Bashundhara city.

== Points of interest ==
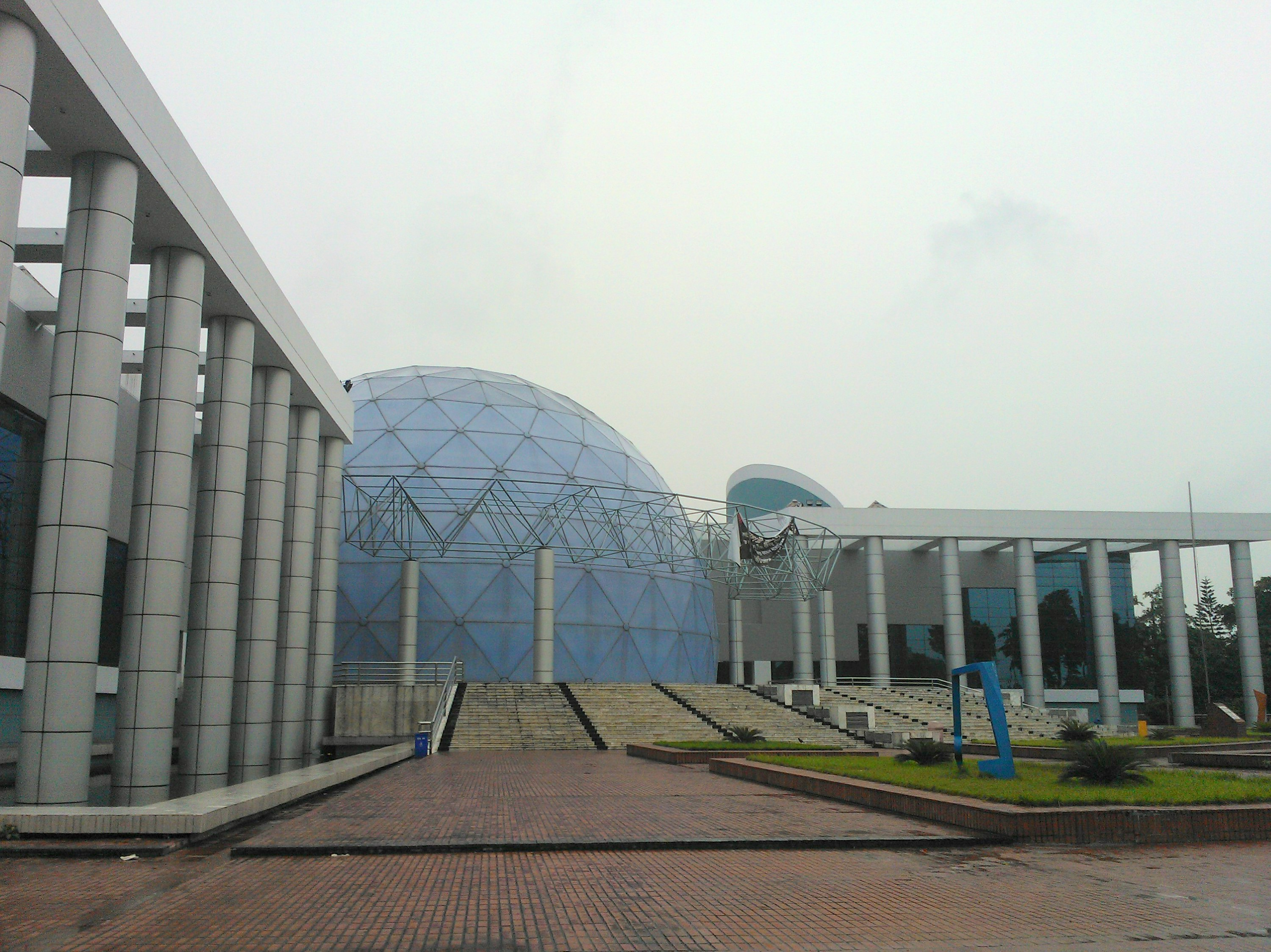
Novo Theatre (Planetarium)

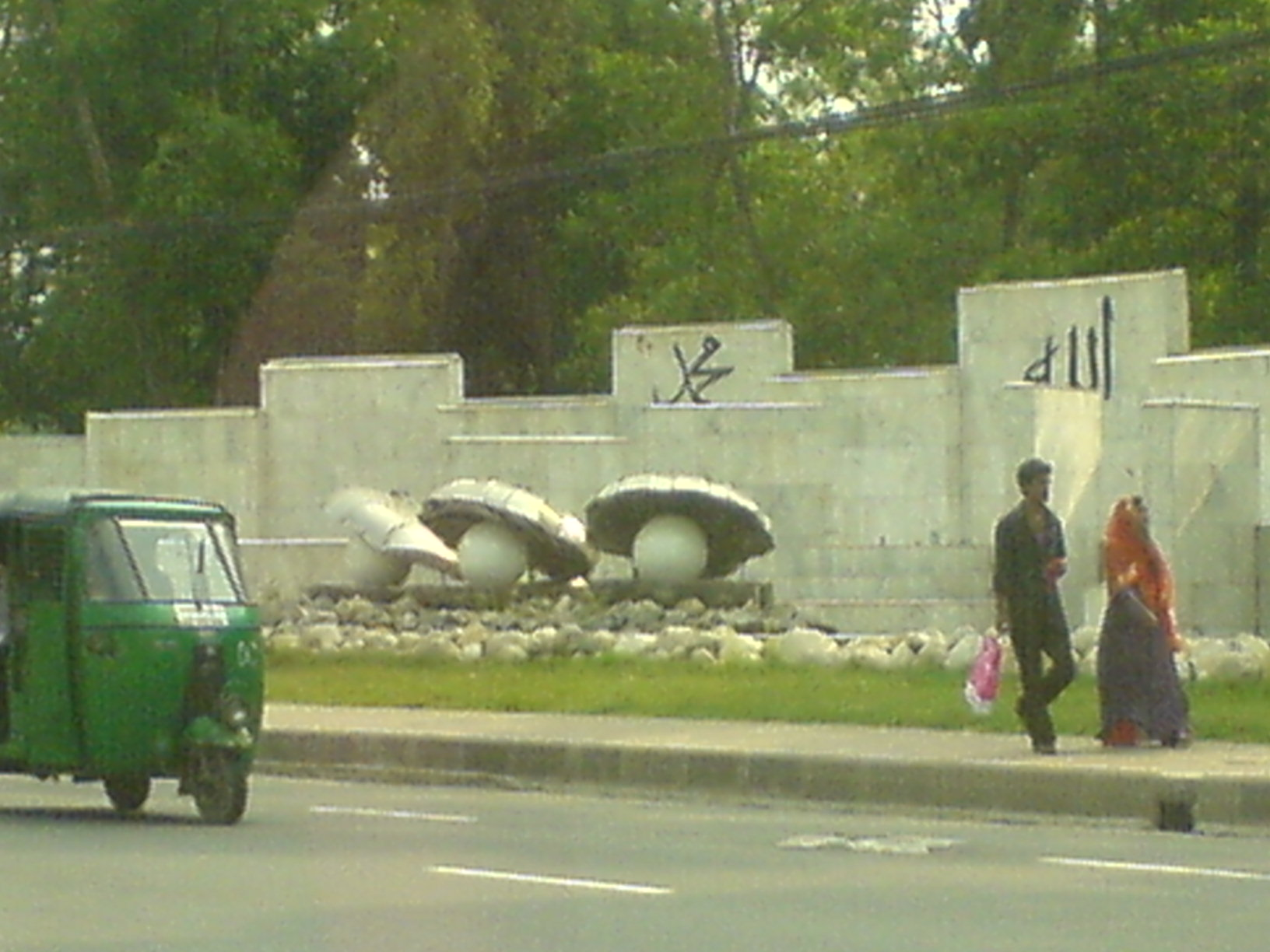
Ratna Dip

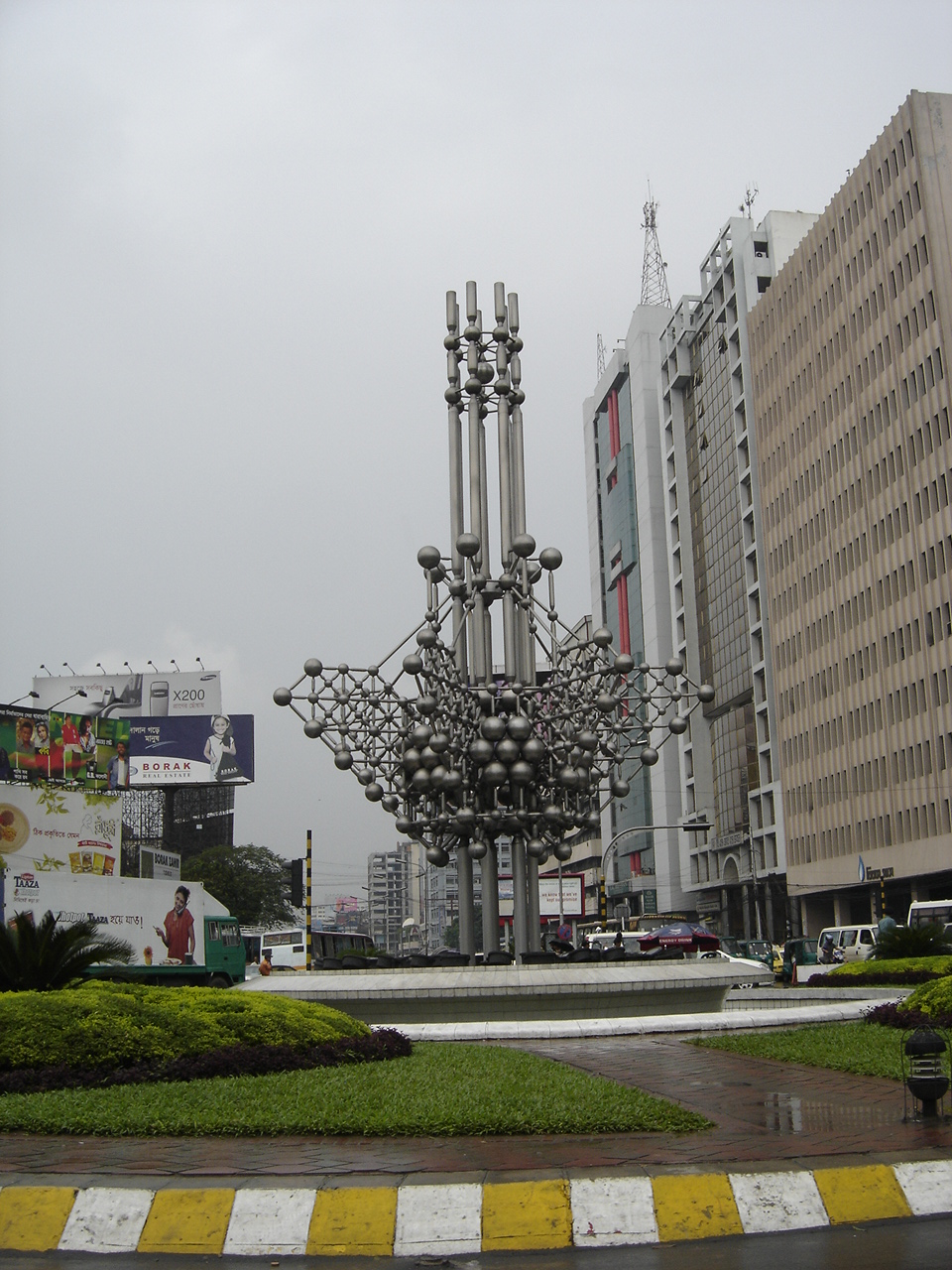
SAARC Foara

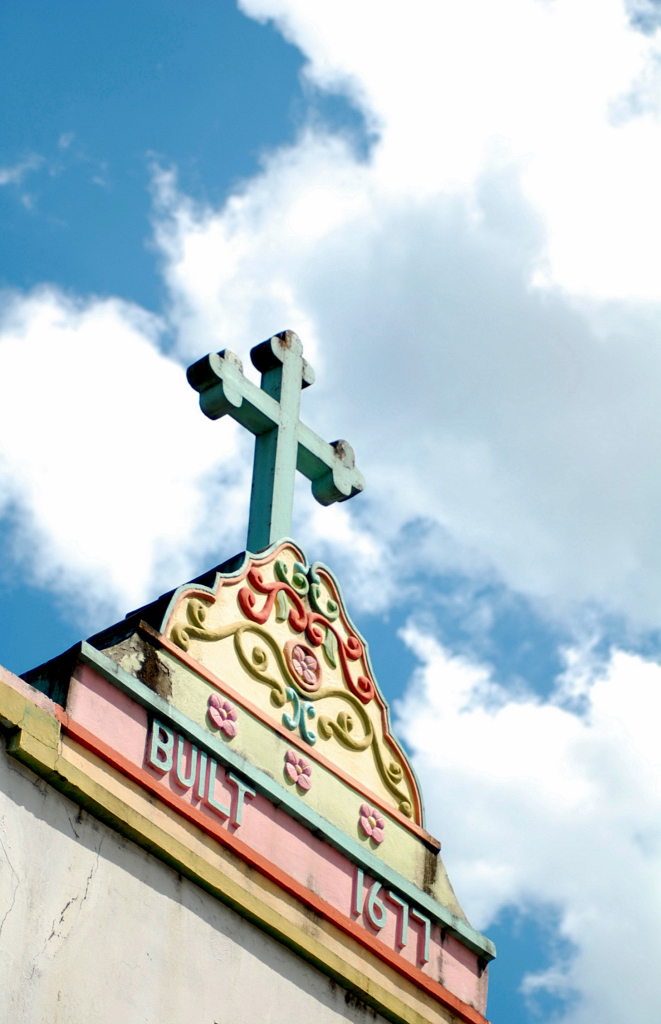
Holy Rosary Church
- Prime Minister's Office
- Chief Adviser's Office
- Jatiyo Sangshad Bhaban
- Novo Theatre (Planetarium)
- Holy Rosary Church
- Bashundhara City
- Bijoy Shoroni Fountain
- SAARC Fountain
- Island of Pearl-Ratna dip in front of Prime Minister Office
- Pan Pacific Sonargaon
- Bangladesh Air Force Museum

=== Parks ===
Zia Udyan (sometimes called Chandrima Uddan) is a park beside the Jatiyo Sangshad Bhaban. The name means "Moonlight Park" in Bengali.

The park is where the former Bangladeshi President Ziaur Rahman was buried. It is connected to the road with a bridge which runs over the Crescent Lake. The park is a very common place to spend leisure time. It is very popular for morning and evening walks.

There is Farmgate Park, which is a very popular destination for young people.

== Airport ==
Tejgaon Airport (ICAO: VGTJ) at Tejgaon, was the country's sole international airport before the construction of the new Hazrat Shahjalal International Airport (IATA: DAC, ICAO: VGHS) which was named Zia International airport (ICAO: VGZR).

The first Royal Indian Air Force light fighter landed on the under-construction runway of Tejgaon at the beginning of 1943.

Following the transfer of civilian flights to the new Hazrat Shahjalal International Airport in 1981, Tejgaon was taken under the control of the Bangladesh Air Force & Bangladesh Army.

== Education ==
Over the last 50 years, many schools, colleges and private universities have developed around the area — Bangladesh University of Textiles, Dhaka Polytechnic Institute, Hamdard Public College, Government Science College, Holy Cross College, Government Science High School, Tejgaon College, Tejgaon Govt High School, Tejgaon Government Girls' High School are the most well known. The National Institute of Ear, Nose and Throat (ENT) is also in Tejgaon.

== Gallery ==
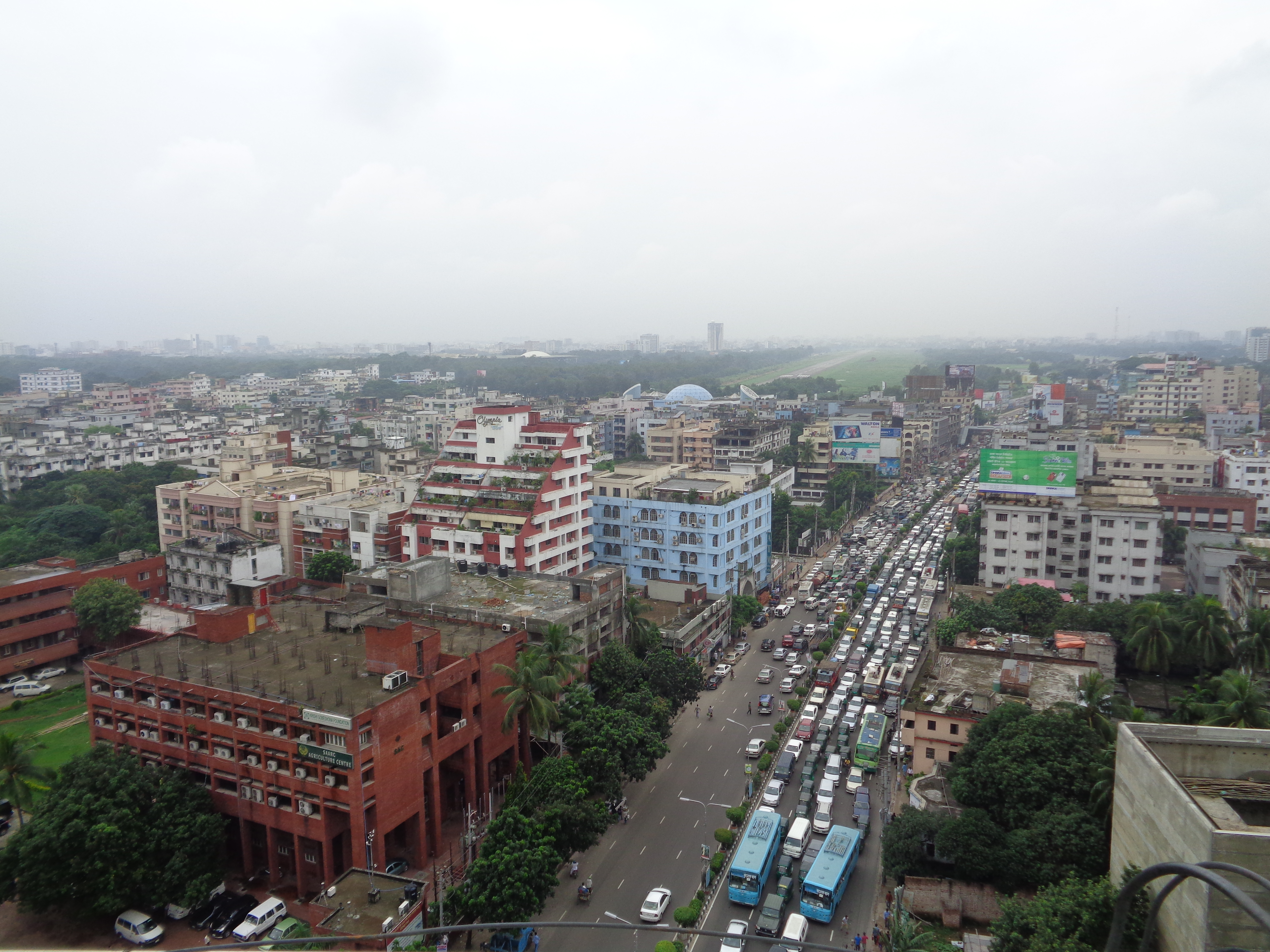

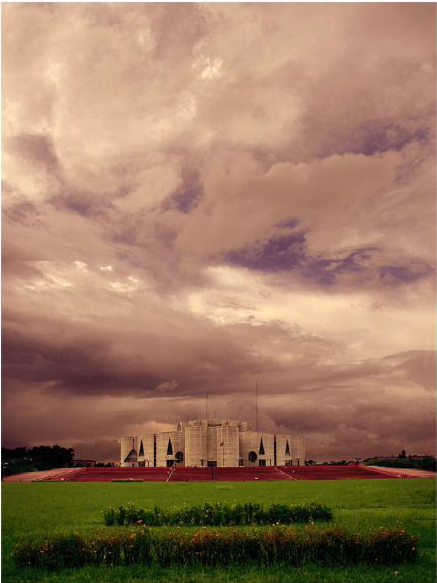

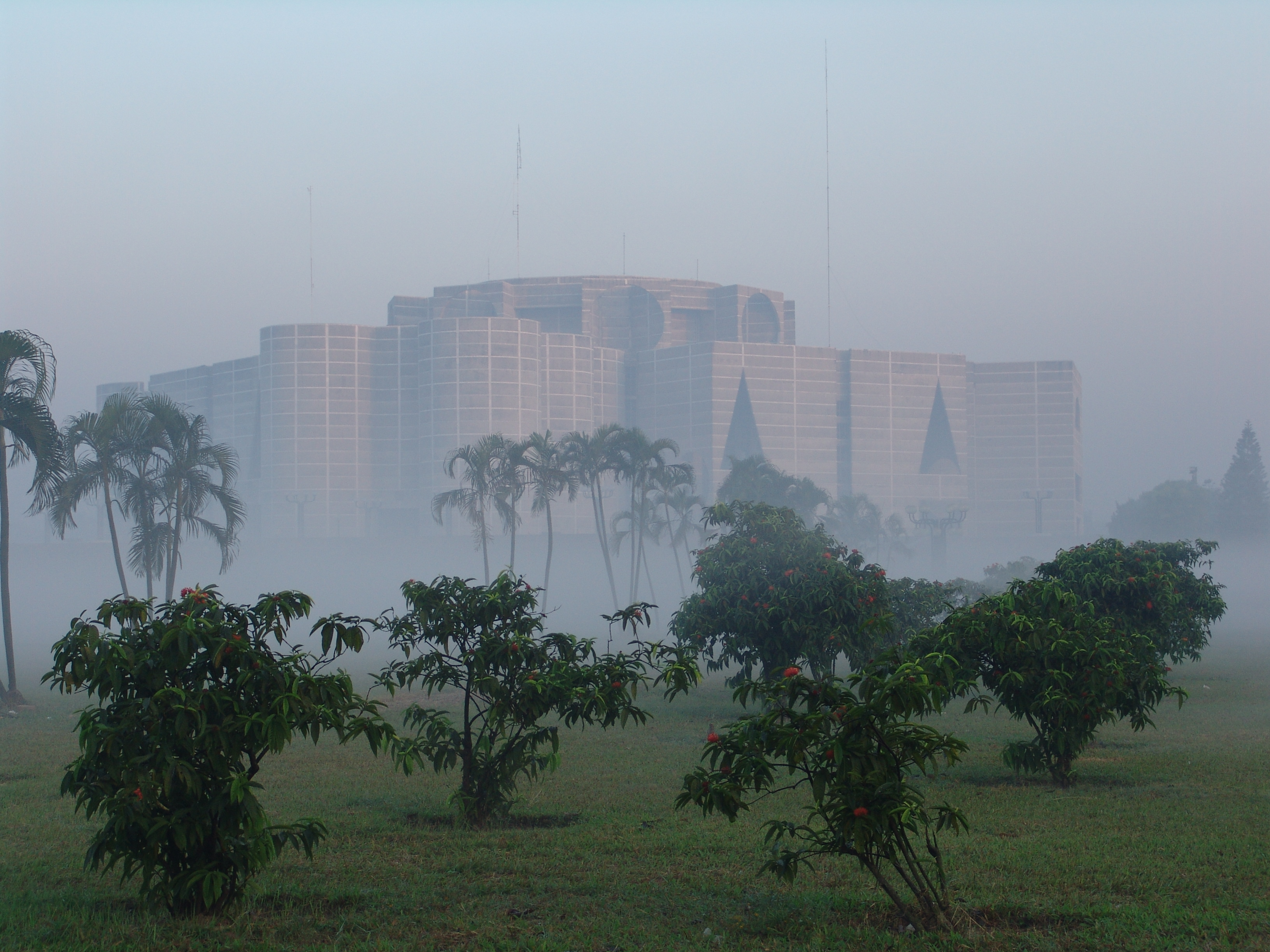

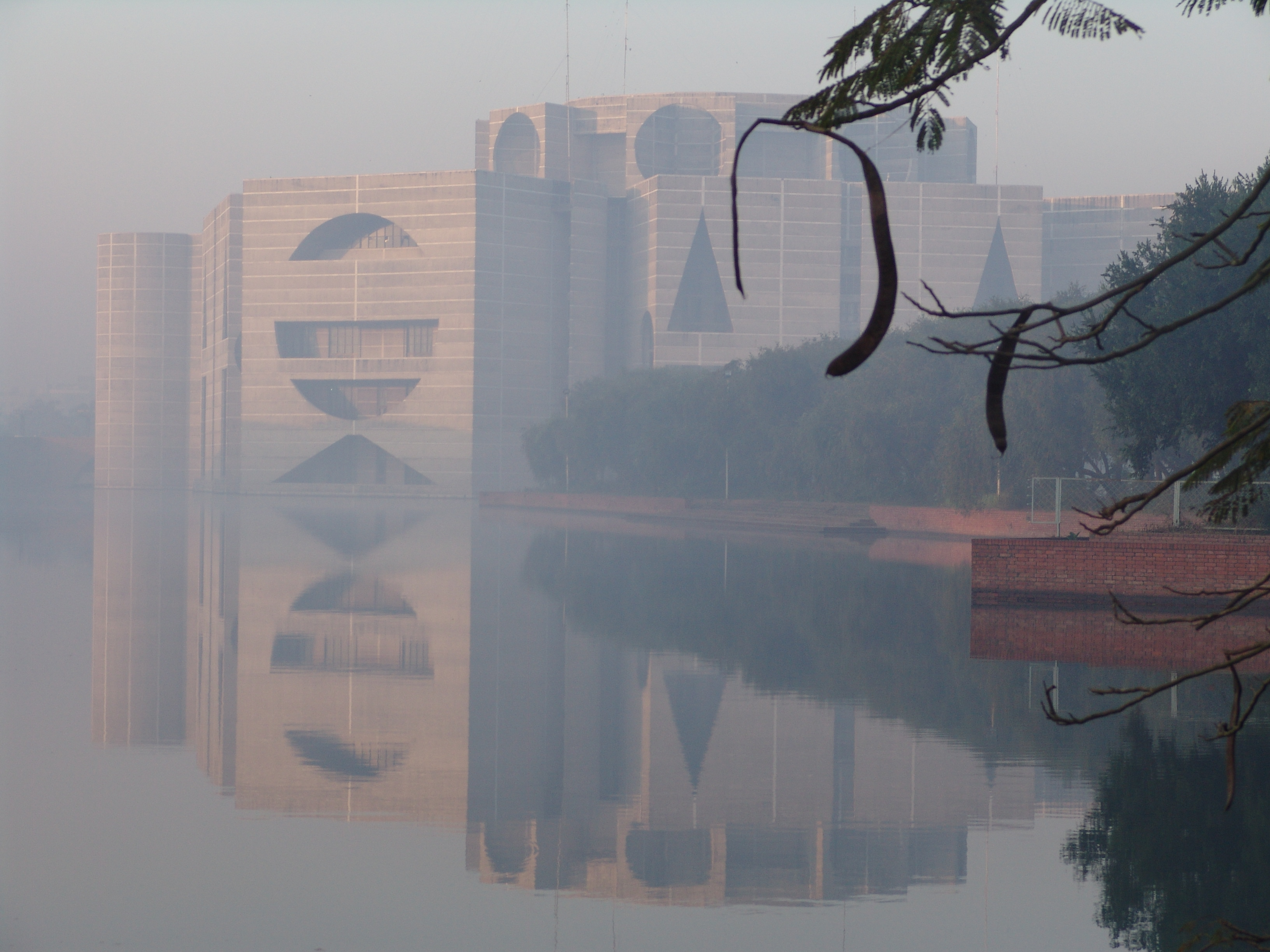

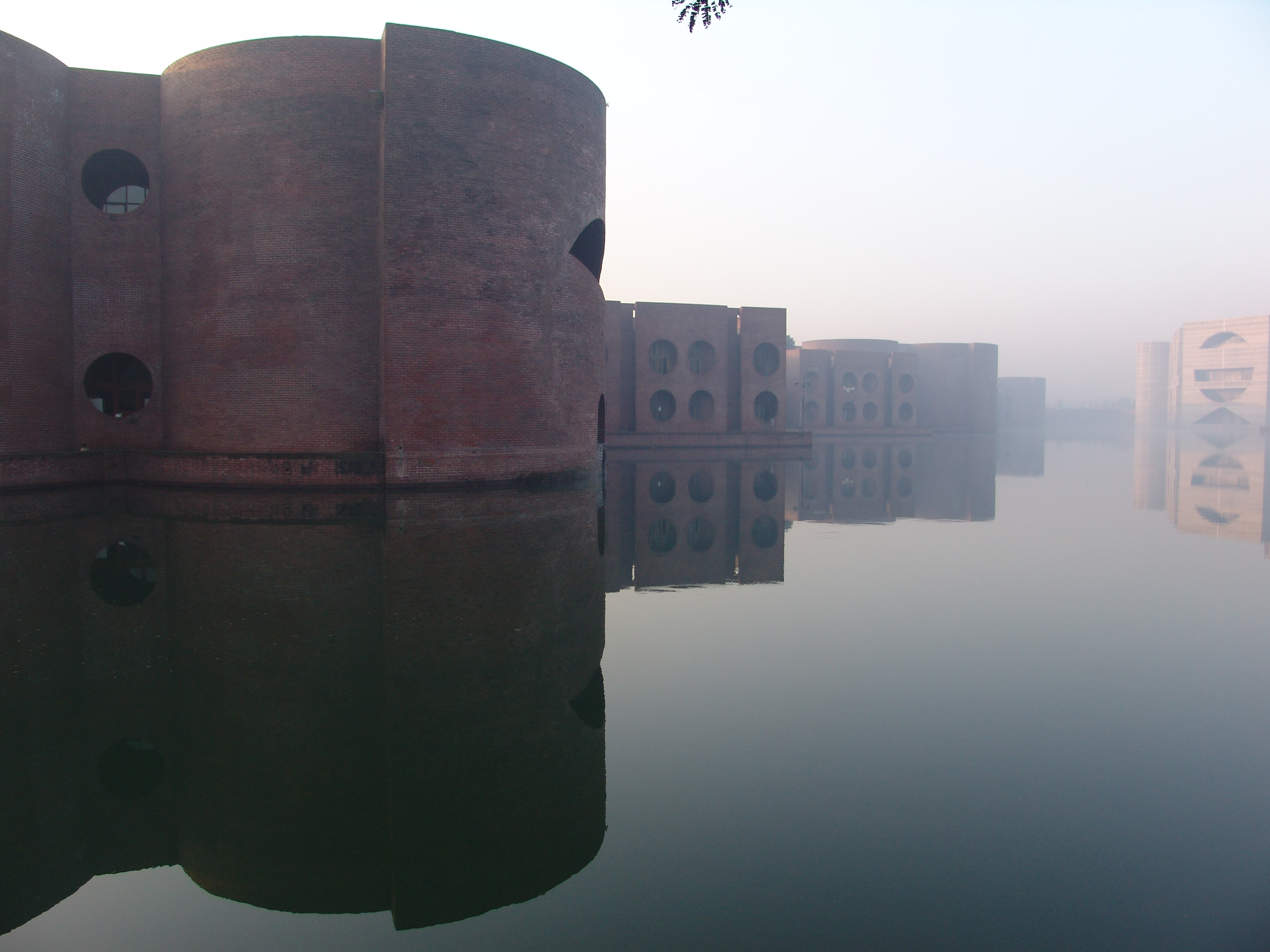

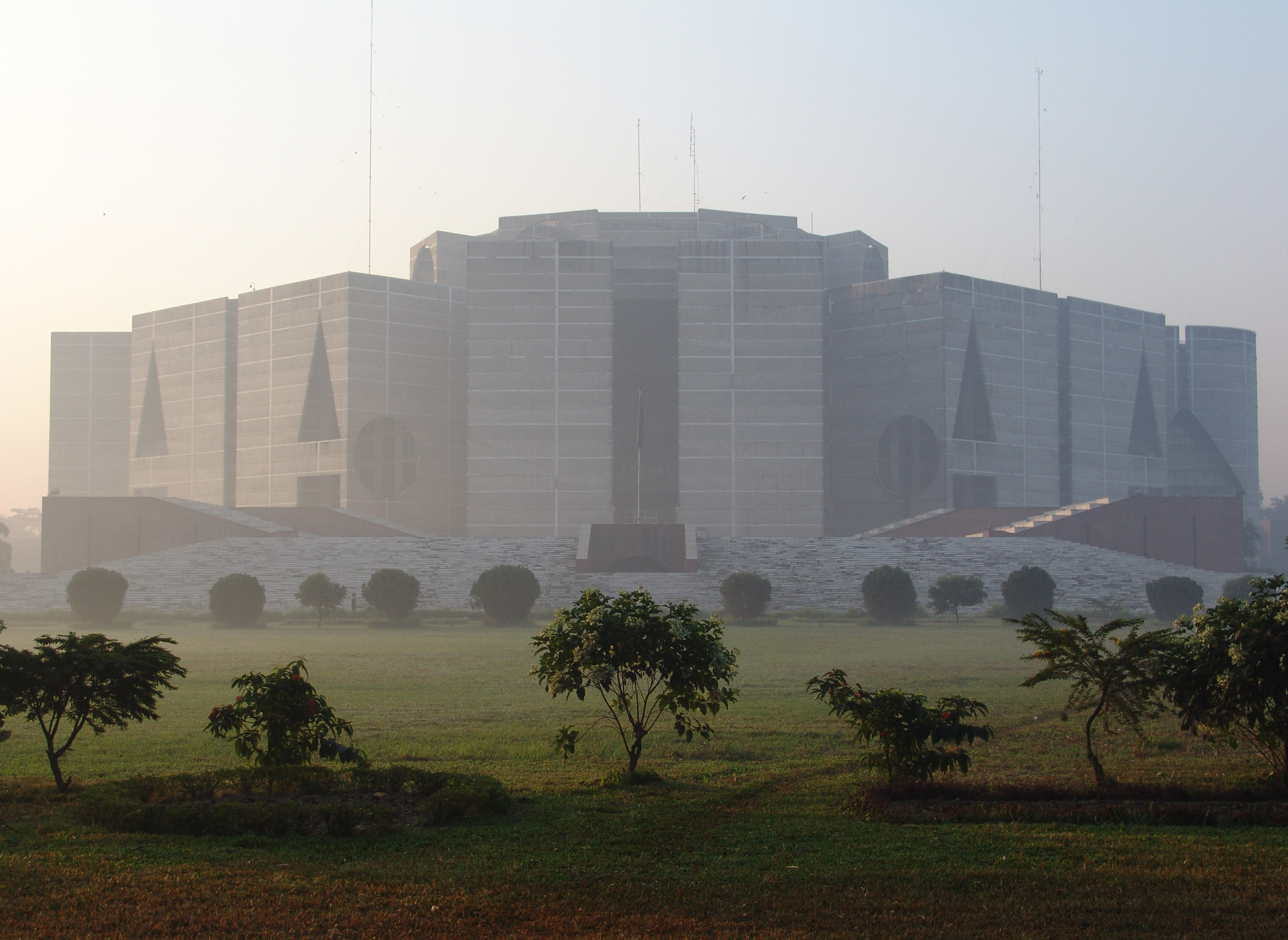

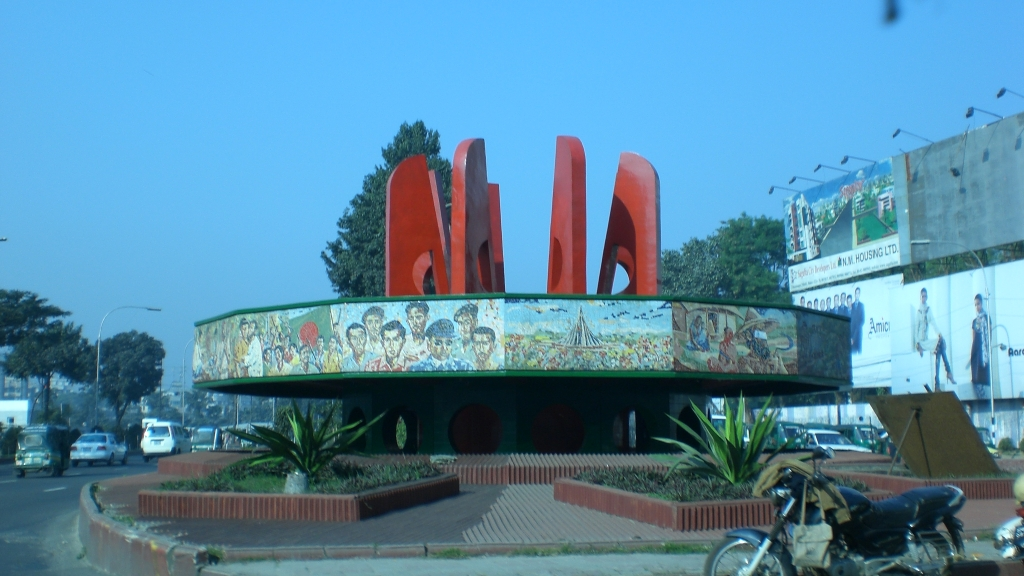

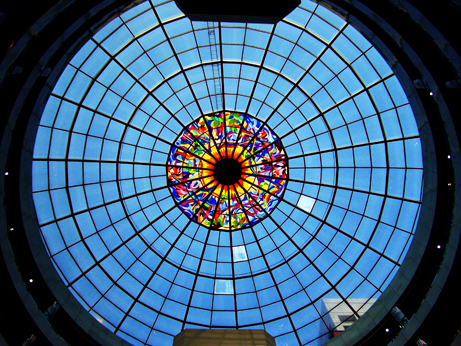

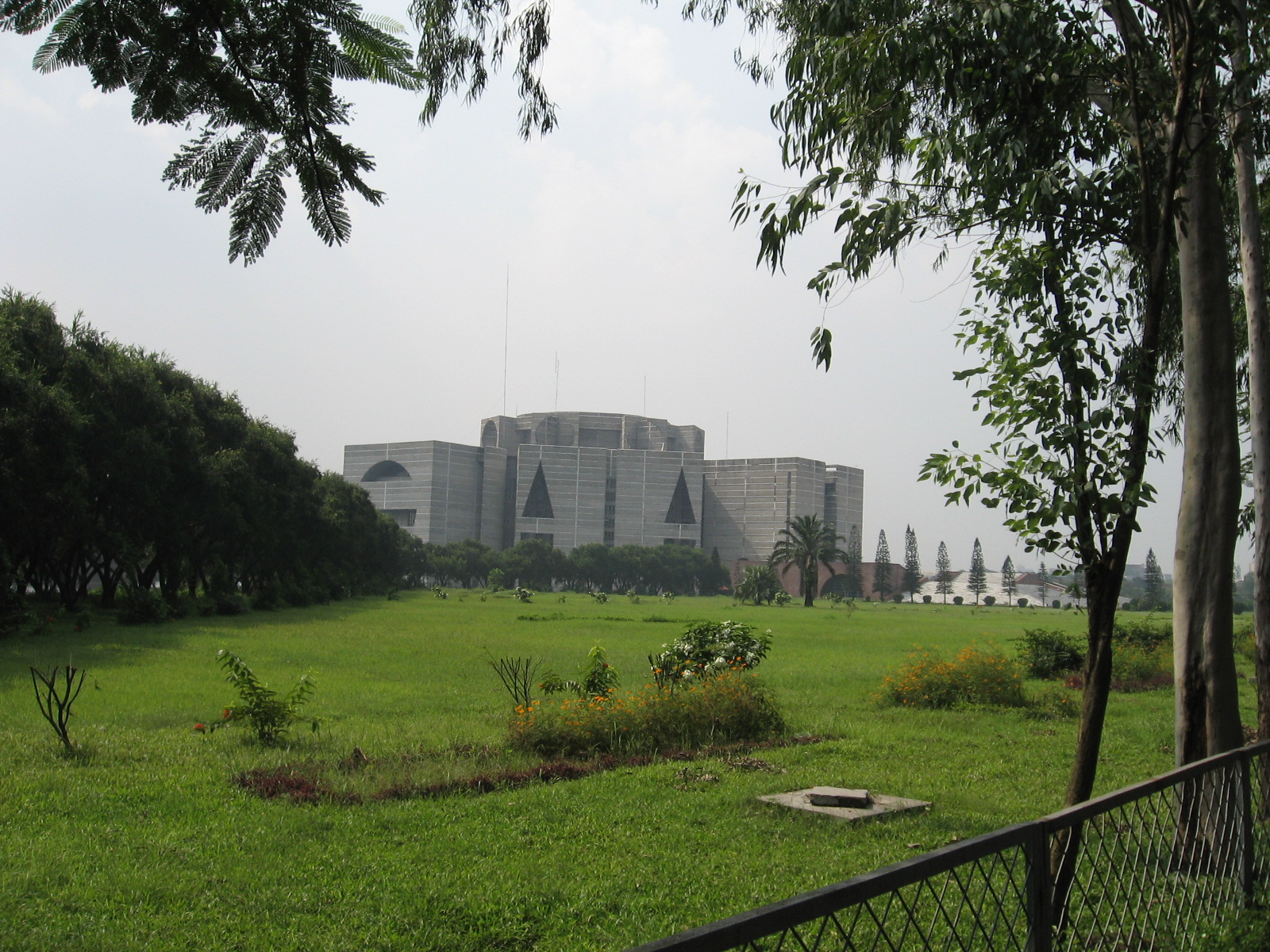

== See also ==
- Upazilas of Bangladesh
- Districts of Bangladesh
- Divisions of Bangladesh
- Thanas of Bangladesh
- Union Councils of Bangladesh
- Administrative geography of Bangladesh
