= East Rajabazar =

Coordinates: 23.7535°N 90.3865°E

East Rajabazar (Bengali: পূর্ব রাজাবাজার) is a mahallah (neighborhood) in Ward 40 of Tejgaon Thana, Dhaka city, Bangladesh. According to the 2011 Bangladesh census, it had 6,195 households and a population of 29,820.
