= Tejturi Bazar =

Coordinates: 23.756095°N 90.391906°E

Tejturi Bazar is a neighborhood in Tejgaon, Dhaka. It's divided into East

Tejturi Bazar & West Tejturi Bazar. It situated on both sides of Kazi Nazrul Islam Avenue. It's densely populated and situated in the heart of the city.
