= Government Science College, Dhaka =

Educational institution in Bangladesh

- সরকারি বিজ্ঞান কলেজ, ঢাকা
- Logo of Government Science College, Dhaka
- Other names: GSC, সবিক
- Former name: Intermediate Technical College
- Motto: Discipline, education, character and development
- Type: Higher secondary school; university-affiliated college
- Established: 1954
- Principal: Professor Salma Begum (12793)(Acting In Charge)
- Faculty: ~50
- Students: ~2250
- Location: Tejgaon, Dhaka, Dhaka Division, Bangladesh; 23°45′31″N 90°23′35″E
- Campus: Urban, 9.00 acres
- Colours
- Website: www.gsctd.edu.bd

Government Science College, Tejgaon, Dhaka (Bengali: সরকারি বিজ্ঞান কলেজ, ঢাকা), also known as 'GSC', is a higher secondary institute of Bangladesh. It is one of the oldest public educational institutions in Dhaka, Bangladesh, established in 1954.

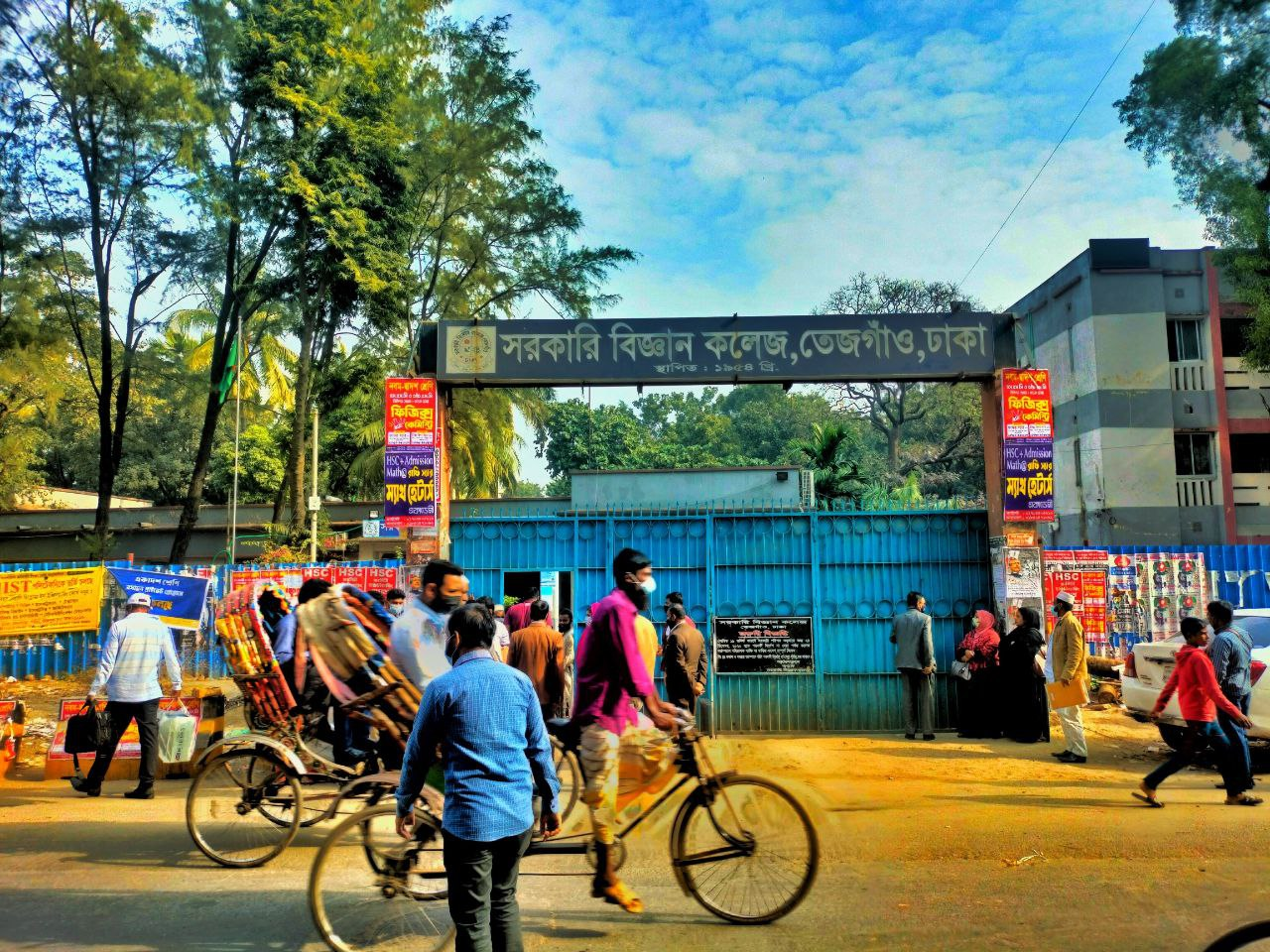
Government Science College Old Gate

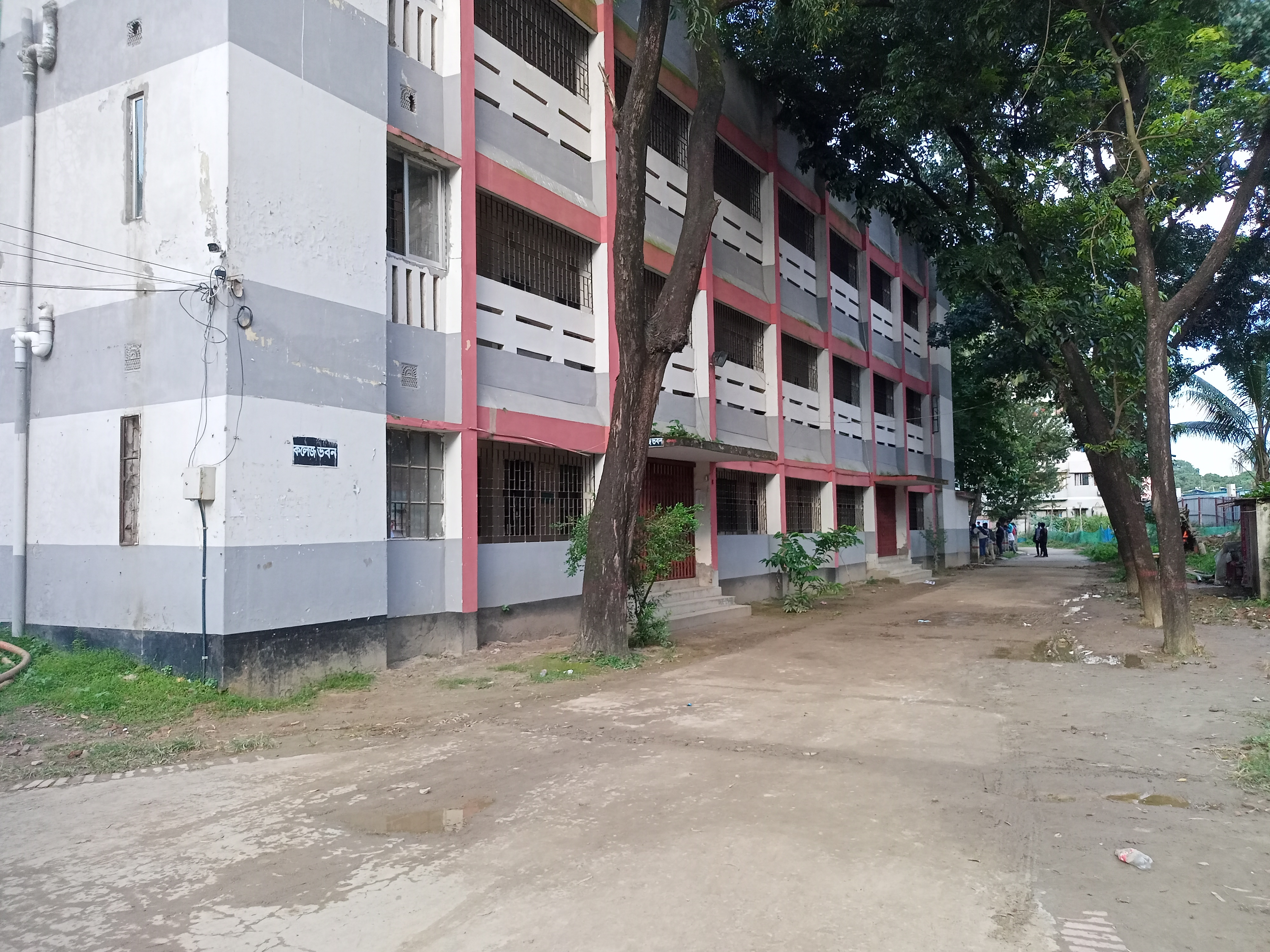
Old College Building of GSC

== History ==
The institution was founded in 1954 under the Colombo Plan of the Common Wealth as Technical High School. The same was upgraded as Intermediate Technical College under the Directorate of Technical Education in 1962. It was the only college in Dhaka city, where students could study science, technology and basic engineering (Technical Drawing, Metal/Wood Works) at the higher secondary level. The Secondary School Certificate Board used to issue certificates to qualified students under a special subject group called "Industrial Arts". In 1972, it was renamed as Government Science College and came under the Ministry of Education. It started offering degree courses in science subjects.

== Infrastructure ==
The college is located on 9 acres of land. It has new six-store building and three-store building along with a large semi-pucca building including Air-conditioning smart multimedia classroom, as well as a library, auditorium, gymnasium, mosque, playground, Shaheed Minar, and College Square(previous Russell Square)

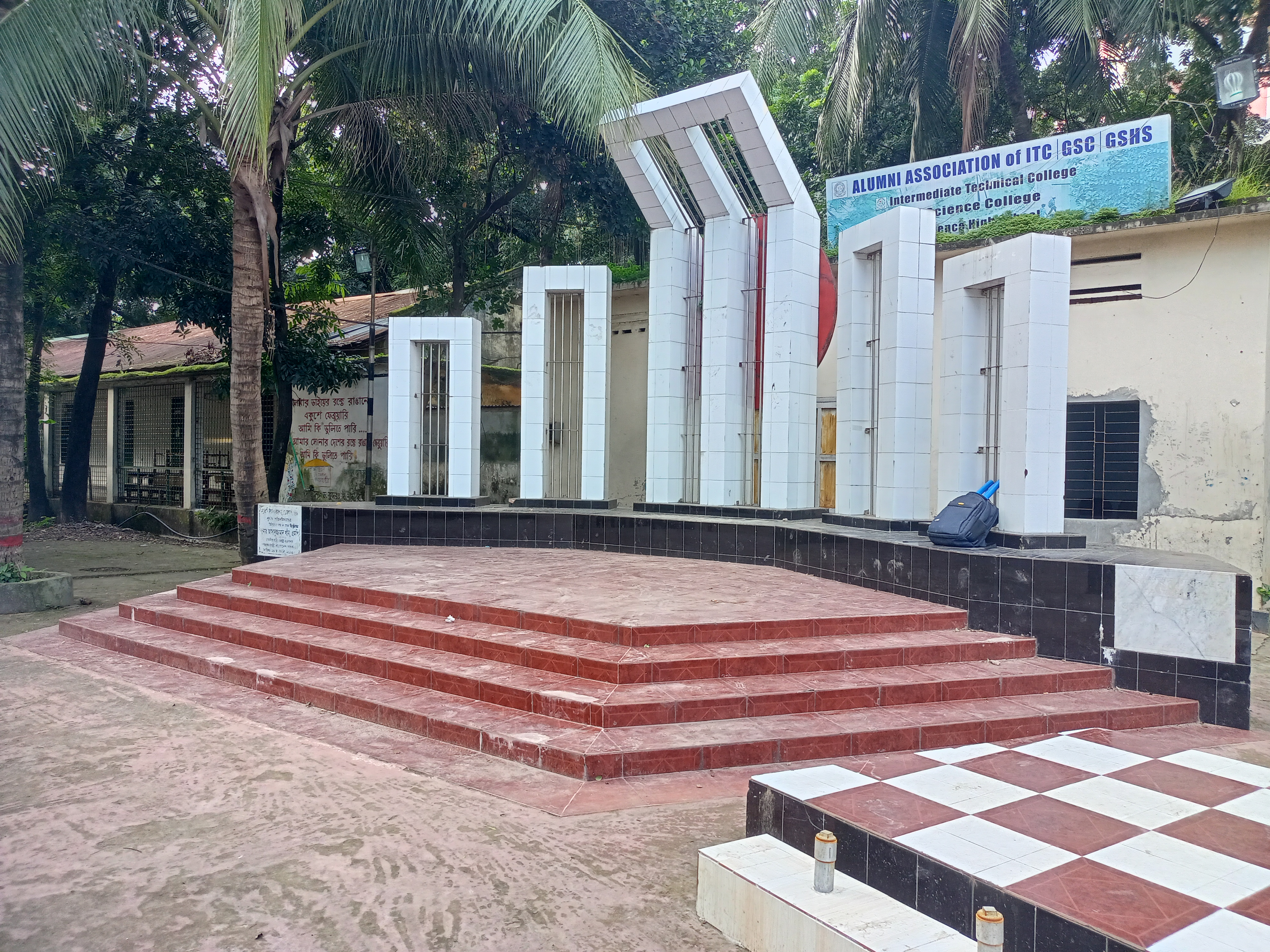
Shaheed Minar

There are two residential hostels(Dr.Kudrat E Khuda & Kazi Nazrul Islam) for students from outside Dhaka.

There are two buses for students residing in Dhaka.

Spondon-1 & Spondon-2

== Notable alumni ==
- A.N.M. Ehsanul Hoque Milan
- Annisul Huq
- A A Mamun, physicist
- Nahid Islam, Chief Whip of the Opposition, GOB, Formar advisor to the interim government, Founding Convener of NCP
- Shahid Uddin Chowdhury Anee
- Zahid Ahsan Russel
- Sabbir Rahman
