= Kawran Bazar =

Karwan Bazar
- Central business district
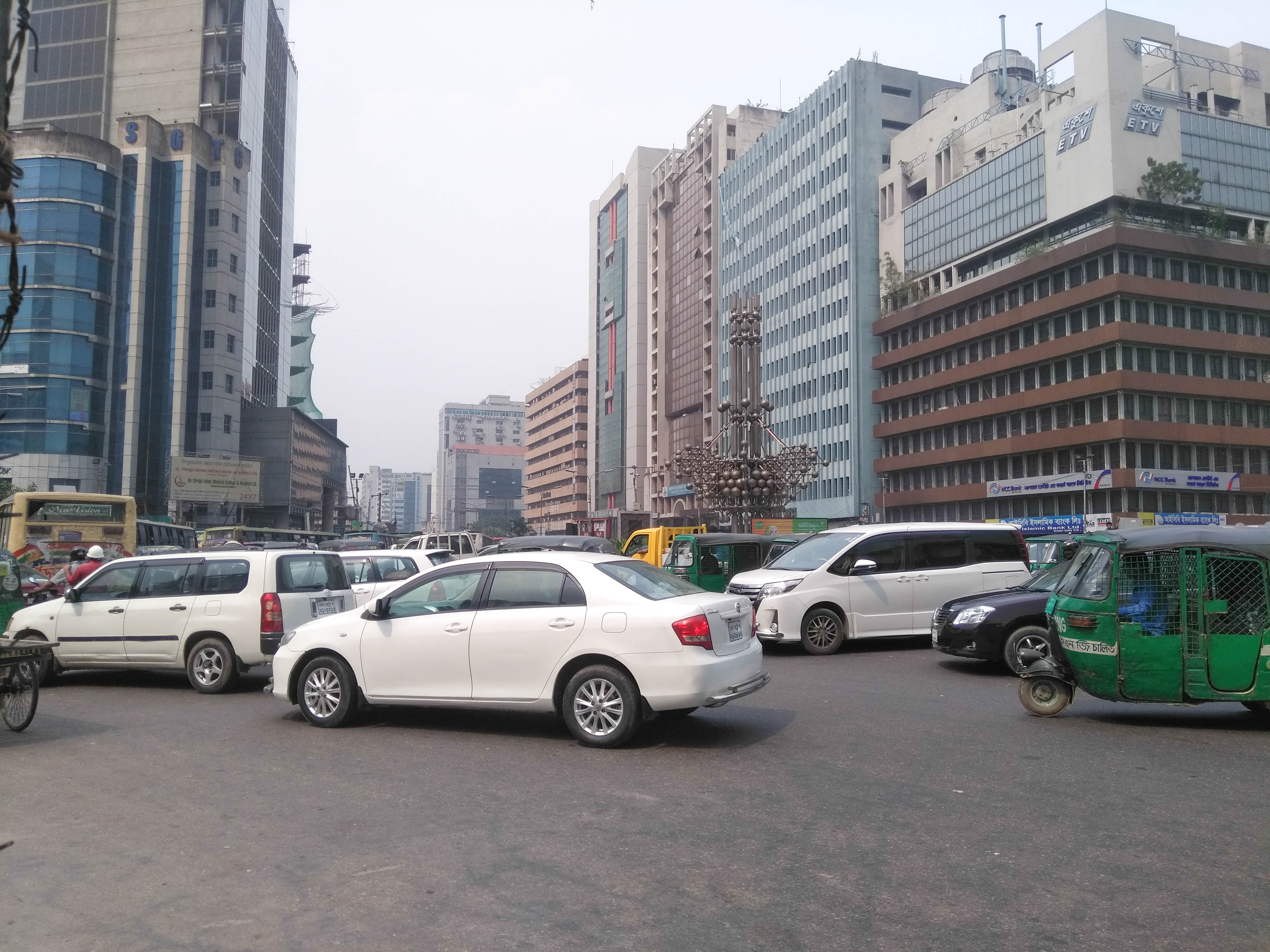
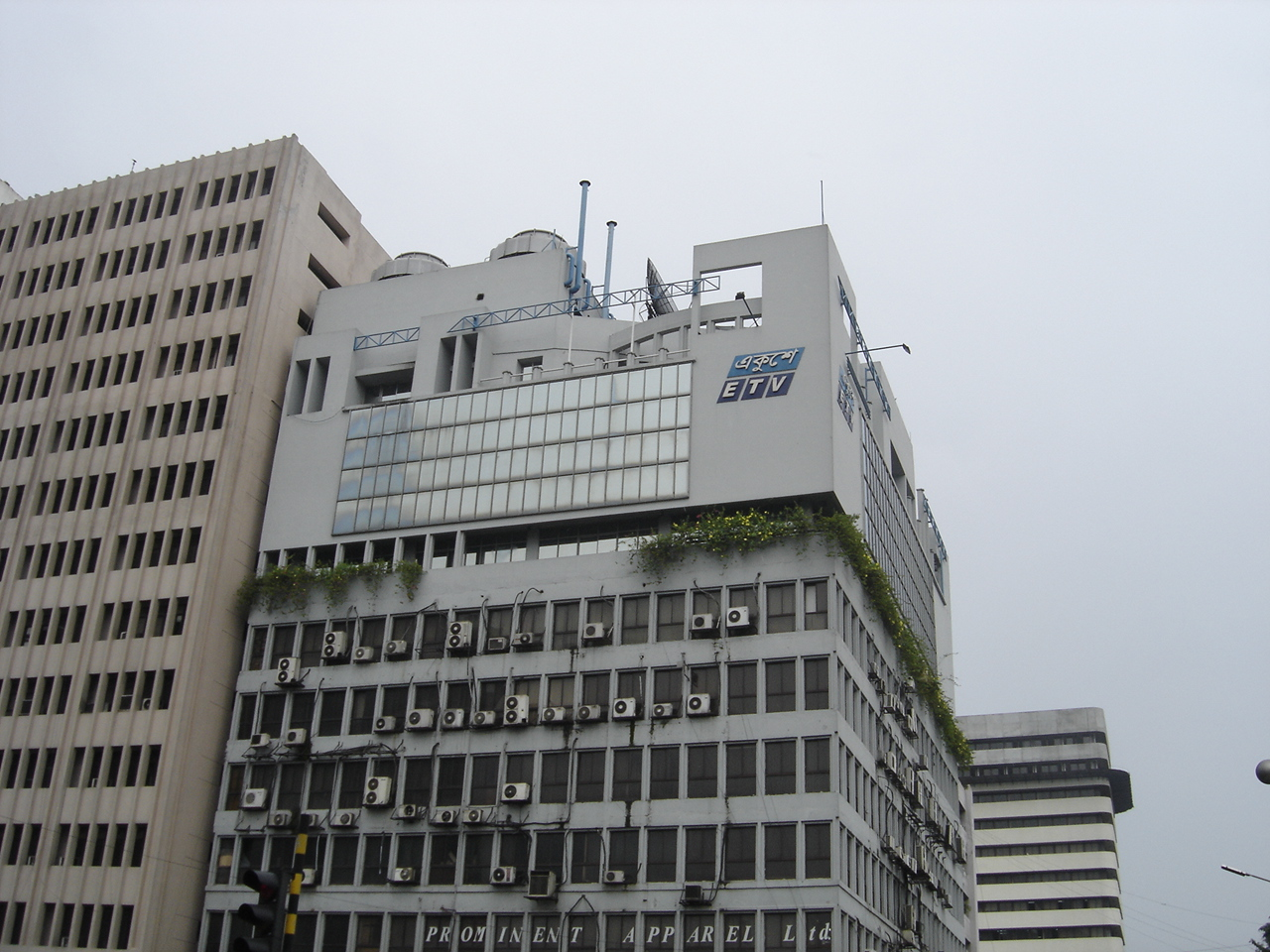
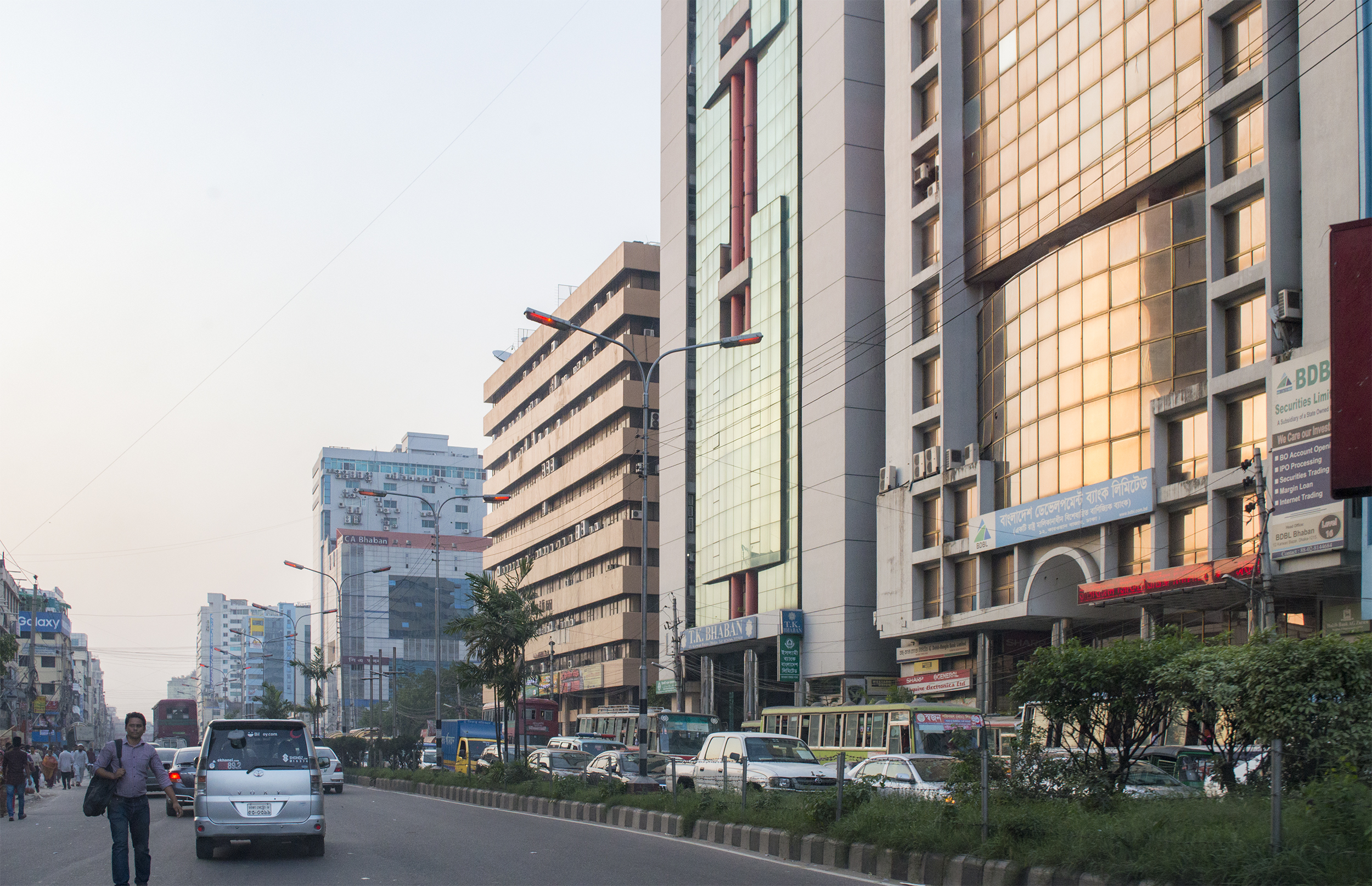
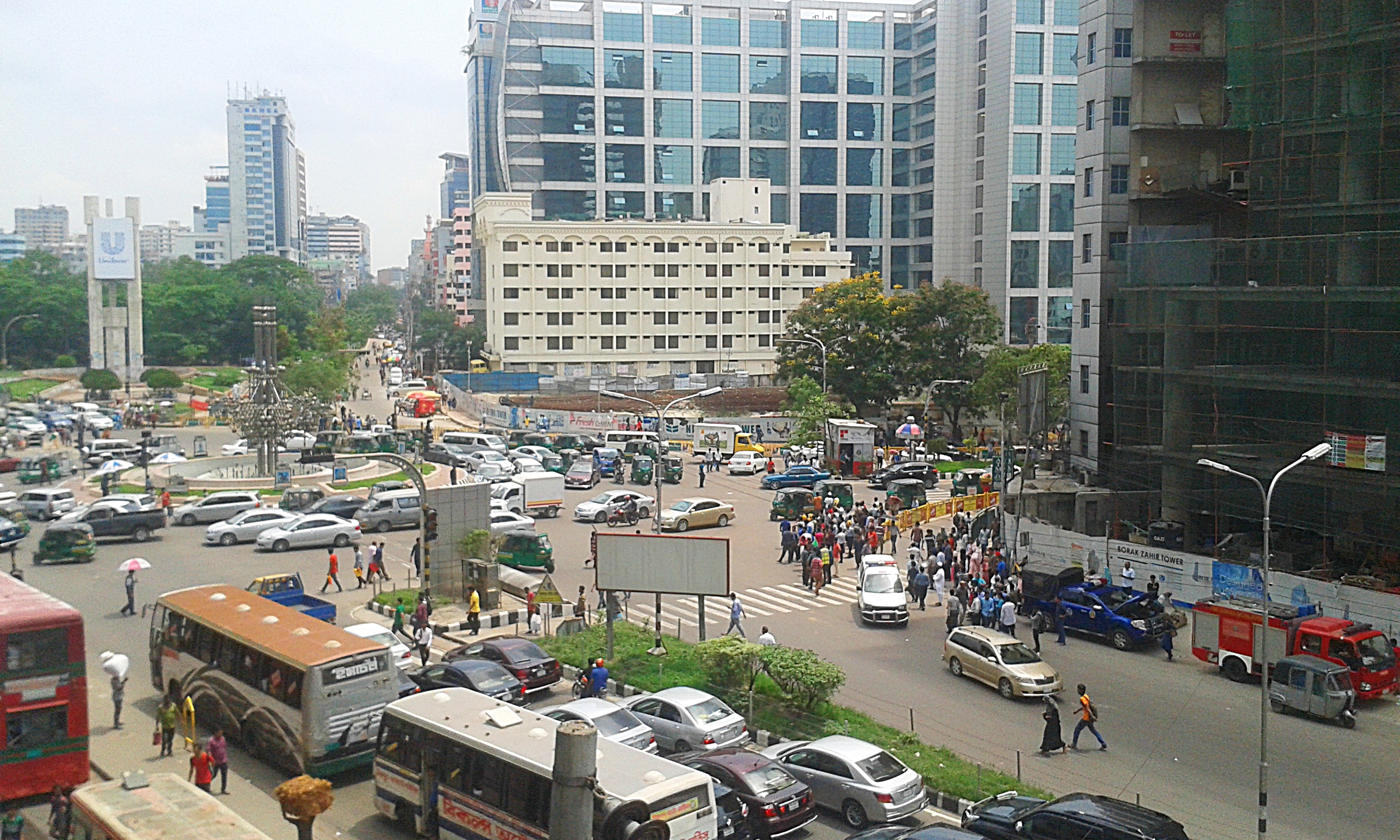
- Interactive map of Karwan Bazar
- Coordinates: 23°45′14″N 90°23′33″E
- Country: Bangladesh
- Division: Dhaka Division
- District: Dhaka District
- City: Dhaka

Karwan Bazar (Bengali: কারওয়ান বাজার), misspelled as Kawran Bazar, is a central business district and one of the biggest commodity marketplaces in Dhaka city, the capital of Bangladesh. Located in Tejgaon Thana, it is a designated commercial area of the Dhaka North City Corporation. The biggest local Bangladeshi fruit wholesale market is located here. Karwan Bazar is next to Panthapath, a road that has several well-known establishments.

== History ==
During the Mughal rule, a customs check post was located near Karwan Bazar. Many traders sold their goods there, before passing through the check point, to avoid paying tax. Markets have existed in the Karwan Bazar area since the 17th century. In the late 18th century, Karwan Singh, a Marwari trader, established a market in the area which gradually came to be known after him. By the late 19th century, it became notable as a marketplace for household products such as pottery and crockery.

== Marketplace ==
Karwan Bazar is one of the largest wholesale marketplaces in Dhaka city and also one of the largest in South Asia. As of 2024, the Dhaka North City Corporation owns four markets at Karwan Bazar, spread across approximately 24 bighas of land, consisting of 1,789 permanent shops and 180 temporary ones. The wholesale market has a daily revenue of 50 million Bangladeshi taka.

== Business district ==
Karwan Bazar has emerged as an important business district of Dhaka. The main offices of Prothom Alo, the Daily Star, Amar Desh, and several other newspapers are located here. Also, the office and studio of television channels Ekushey Television, NTV, ATN Bangla, ATN News, Banglavision and ABC Radio are

located at Karwan Bazar. The main campus of Ahsanullah University of Science and Technology was located here. Square Hospital, Bashundhara City mall, BRB Hospital and many pharmacies are located in Panthapath near Karwan Bazar.

Karwan Bazaar also houses the headquarters for the Trading Corporation of Bangladesh, along with Export Promotion Bureau (EPB) of Bangladesh.
