= Islamization in Bangladesh =

Overview of Bangladesh's sociopolitical shift towards Islamic politics and culture

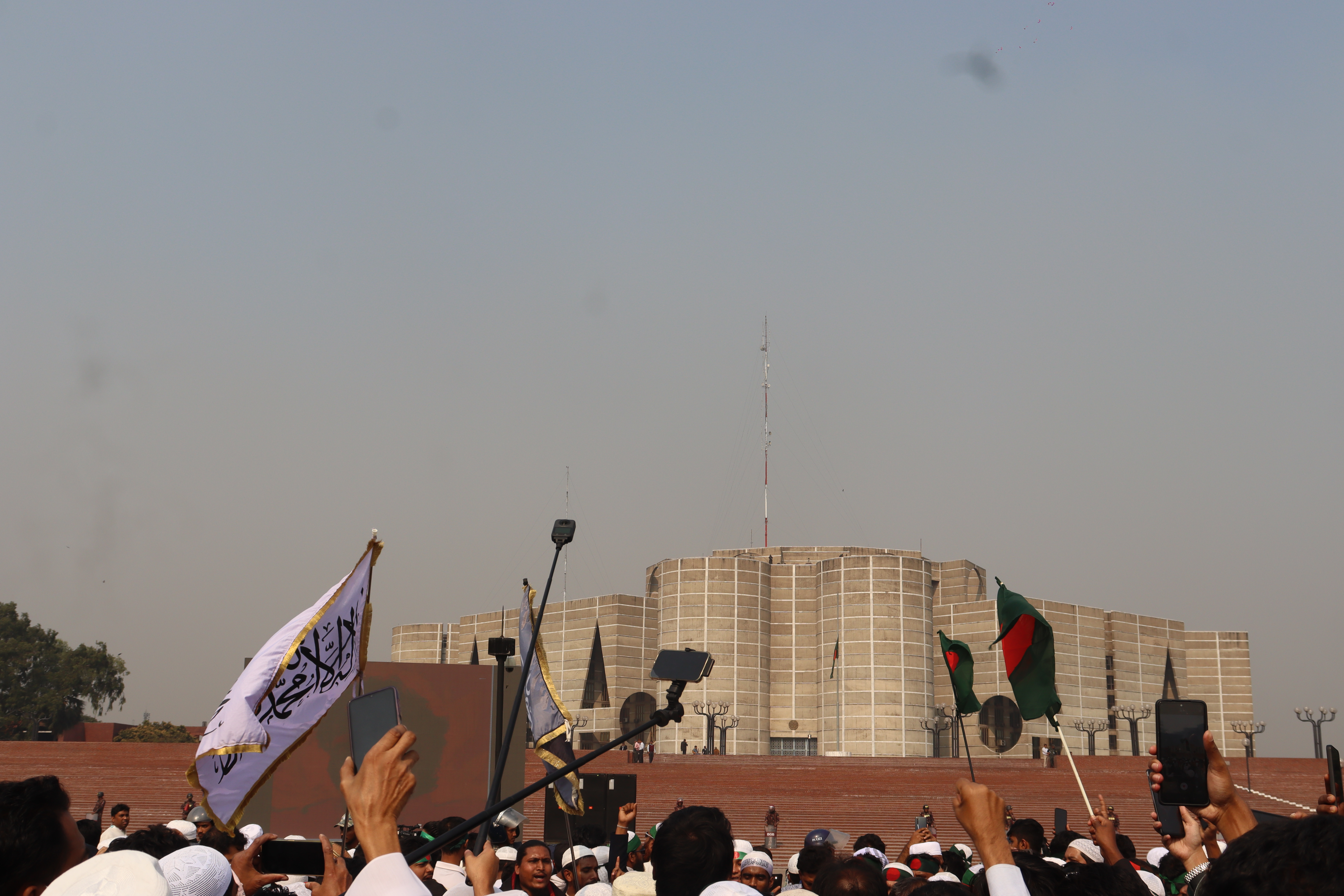
Muslim congregation and flags inscribed with the shahada at the funeral of Osman Hadi in front of the Jatiya Sangsad Bhaban; symbolizing the increasing influence of Islamic culture in social and political spheres.

Islamization (Bengali: ইসলামীকরণ, romanized: Islāmīkôrôṇ) refers to the historical and ongoing process through which Islamic principles, values, and institutions have influenced Bangladesh's legal framework, education system, politics, and social norms. Its proponents have argued that the post-independence government had excluded religious voice and the Islamist right and attempts to remove secularism are a counter-hegemonic response to decades of perceived ideological exclusion.

Bangladesh was originally founded in 1971 as a secular republic grounded in the ideals of secular Bengali nationalism. However, beginning in the late 1970s, successive regimes have incrementally integrated Islamic elements into the state apparatus. Rooted in Bangladesh's experience as part of Muslim-majority Pakistan and shaped by broader pan-Islamist sentiments, the push for Islamization gained momentum under Ziaur Rahman and intensified under Hussain Muhammad Ershad, who declared Islam the state religion in 1988. Today, Islam continues to play a prominent role in Bangladeshi society, law, and politics, often generating debate over the balance between secularism and religious identity in the nation's governance and public life.

== Background ==
The partition of India was based on religion. Pakistan was founded on the basis of securing a sovereign homeland for the Muslims of the subcontinent to live in self-determination. It led to the creation of Muslim majority Pakistan and Hindu majority India. East Bengal (today Bangladesh) became a province of Pakistan.

After the creation of Pakistan in 1947 during Bengali language movement, many advocated to Muhammad Ali Jinnah making Arabic the state language of Pakistan as a Muslim nationalist country, which was later supported and reiterated by many, but the proposal ultimately did not gain popular support and popularity. These proposals to make Arabic the state language failed to gain substantial support in any part of Pakistan. However, as this demand is linked to the question of the development of Islamic culture, it indirectly reinforced the demand for the introduction of Arabic script in the state language Urdu and Bengali (Dobhashi) in some quarters.

The first formal step taken to transform Pakistan into an ideological Islamic state was in March 1949 when the country's first Prime Minister, Liaquat Ali Khan, introduced the Objectives Resolution in the Constituent Assembly. The Objectives Resolution declared that sovereignty over the entire universe belongs to God Almighty. The president of the Muslim League, Chaudhry Khaliquzzaman, announced that Pakistan would bring together all Muslim countries into Islamistan - a pan-Islamic entity. Keith Callard, one of the earliest scholars on Pakistani politics, observed that Pakistanis believed in the essential unity of purpose and outlook in the Muslim world:

Pakistan was founded to advance the cause of Muslims. Other Muslims might have been expected to be sympathetic, even enthusiastic. But this assumed that other Muslim states would take the same view of the relation between religion and nationality.

However, Pakistan's pan-Islamist sentiments were not shared by other Muslim governments at the time. Nationalism in other parts of the Muslim world was based on ethnicity, language and culture. Social scientist Nasim Ahmad Jawed conducted a survey in 1969 in pre-divided Pakistan on the type of national identity that was used by educated professional people. He found that over 60% of people in East Pakistan (modern day Bangladesh) professed to have a secular national identity. However, in West Pakistan (current day Pakistan) the same figure professed to have an Islamic and not a secular identity. Furthermore, the same figure in East Pakistan defined their identity in terms of their ethnicity and not Islam. But it was the opposite in West Pakistan where Islam was stated to be more important than ethnicity.

The Muslim nationalism of the Muslim League, which was the basis of creation of Pakistan, was challenged by the rise of socialist outfits like the West Pakistan based Pakistan People's Party & the East Pakistan based All Pakistan Awami League following Jinnah's death. Khwaja Nazimuddin, an influential Muslim League leader, tried to suppress Bengali nationalism ignited by the police firing upon peaceful protestors demanding Bengali be made an official language alongside Urdu on 21st February 1952 by giving greater emphasis on Islamic solidarity, through steps like insisting that Bengali Muslims start writing Bengali in Arabic Nastaliq script instead of the native Eastern Nagari script used by Bengali Hindus (Note: Similar phenomenon is also observed in case of Sindhi, Punjabi & Kashmiri languages, with Sindhi, Punjabi & Kashmiri Muslim speakers using the Arabic script fonts like Nastaliq & Shahmukhi to write these languages, while their non-Muslim counterparts viz. Sindhi Hindus, Sikhs, Punjabi Hindus & Kashmiri Hindus using Brahmic scripts like the Devanagari script & Gurmukhi script to write the same languages. Correlation of script usage with religious identity goes back to the Hindi-Urdu controversy.) & that Bengali Muslims stop using loan words from Sanskrit, which he described as the language of kafirs, a proposal that was first pushed forward by Fazlur Rahman.

Bangladesh was thought to be established on the basis of secular Bengali nationalism that opposed the religion based politics of Pakistan.

== History ==
=== Under Ziaur Rahman (1975–1981) ===
Following the assassination of Sheikh Mujibur Rahman and Sipahi–Janata Revolution in 1975, Major General Ziaur Rahman's military-backed regime initiated a series of constitutional changes that altered the fundamental principles of Bangladeshi constitution. After solidifying control over the government, his administration began the process of state-sponsored Islamization that significant impacted on the culture and society of Bangladesh. These actions were published in the Extraordinary Gazette of Bangladesh on 23 April 1977, and later legitimized through the fifth amendment to the Constitution of Bangladesh on 6 April 1979, which endorsed all government proclamation orders, decrees and modifications made under martial law, even those that conflicted with the constitution's original framework.

Rahman's leadership redefined the ideological identity of the state. One of the most significant shifts was the erosion of secularism. The fifth amendment replaced secularism with the phrase "Absolute Trust and Faith in the Almighty Allāh [God]" as one of the four fundamental principles of the constitution. The amendment also replaced secular Bengali nationalism with Bangladeshi nationalism in the constitution. Islamic phrase Bismillah-ar-Rahman-ar-Rahim (in the name of Allah, the Beneficent, the Merciful) was introduced into the preamble of the constitution. The concept of socialism was reinterpreted to mean economic and social justice, while Article 12, which had explicitly enshrined secularism and religious freedom, was entirely removed. In addition, Article 25(2) was incorporated into the constitution, emphasising the state's commitment to foster strong and harmonious relationships among Muslim nations, in which Rahman personally played key role.

Provisions that had barred religion-based political parties were repealed, paving the way for the return of groups like the Bangladesh Muslim League, Jamaat-e-Islami & Nizam-e-Islam previously banned for their opposition to the Liberation War. On 4 May 1976, Proclamation Order III abolished the Article 38 of the constitution, which had previously prohibited the formation of political parties or groupings based on religious orientation. This allowed religiously motivated political groups to participate in the elections. At the same time, the removal of constitutional restrictions on such groups allowed convicted collaborators and war criminals to participate in politics, reversing earlier efforts at accountability. These changes contributed to the decline of secular nationalism as a political philosophy in the country.

In 1977, the government established the Syllabi Committee, which declared Islam a "code of conduct of life". In 1978, Madrasa Education Board was established, which opened new opportunities for the madrasa students to pursue higher education. Furthermore, the Ministry of Religious Affairs was established, alongside the declaration of Mīlād al-Nabī (Muhammad's birthday) as a national holiday.

In these matters, Ziaur Rahman of Bangladesh was a contemporary of Zia-ul-Haq of Pakistan, who fostered similar sociopolitical changes, in the backdrop of an Islamic revival, triggered by the Iranian revolution and Grand Mosque seizure in 1979 and the rise of the Afghan mujahideen. However, Rahman himself opposed theocracy as the system of governance for Bangladesh.

These reforms, viewed by the judiciary in a later 2005 High Court verdict, were seen as damaging to the sovereign, democratic, and secular nature of the constitution. The court declared the amendment "unconstitutional". The court concluded that the amendments disrupted the core structure of the republic and compromised the spirit of the Liberation War. The Supreme Court upheld this verdict on 2 February 2010, with modifications and observations, affirming that the amendment fundamentally distorted the values of the Liberation War and transformed Bangladesh from a secular republic into a state influenced by theocratic principles.

=== Under Hussain Muhammad Ershad (1982–1990) ===
Following the assassination of Ziaur Rahman in 1981, General Hussain Muhammad Ershad seized power in a bloodless military coup on 24 March 1982, overthrowing the democratically elected president Abdus Sattar. Ershad had a strong vision of Islamization in Bangladesh, which he considered to be the driving force behind his unwavering commitment. Under his leadership, the process of state-sponsored Islamization accelerated.

In 1988, Ershad government made a significant and controversial change to the constitution through the Eighth Amendment Bill that recognized Islam as the state religion of Bangladesh. This marked a permanent departure from the country's original secular foundation established in 1972. This was criticized by his opponents as a strategic move to "cultivate alliances with Islamic nations and legitimise his authoritarian regime". It was intriguing when the Awami League (AL), Bangladesh Nationalist Party (BNP) and leftist parties organized strikes opposing the eighth amendment, where Jamaat-e-Islami abstained. His Islamization of the constitution has had a lasting impact on the political and ideological landscape of Bangladesh.

Resistance against Ershad's regime grew in the later years. In 1990, the Ershad's regime was widely blamed for negligence (and some human rights analysis allege active participation) in the anti-Hindu riots following the Babri Mosque incident in India, the largest communal disturbances since Bangladeshi independence, as a means of diverting attention from the rapidly increasing opposition to his rule. Ershad was forced to resign following the 1990 mass uprising, primarily spearheaded by the BNP and AL.

=== Under Khaleda Zia (2001–2006) ===
In 2001, the Bangladesh Nationalist Party (BNP) formed a coalition government led by Khaleda Zia with the Bangladesh Jamaat-e-Islami, the largest Islamist political party in Bangladesh. Bangladesh Jamaat-e-Islami received 17 seats which would be reduced to 18 seats in 2008. In the 2001 election manifestos, major political parties in Bangladesh showed little ideological difference regarding Islam. The Bangladesh Nationalist Party pledged not to pass laws against Islam, while Jamaat-e-Islami promised to turn the country into an "Islamic republic". The Awami League and Jatiya Party also emphasized aligning laws with the Qur'an and Hadith, with the JP further advocating for Shariah-based legal reforms and compulsory religious education.

After the 2001 election, Hindus suffered widespread attacks, including looting and assault, with state indifference. The Ahmadiyya Muslim community has also faced attacks since 2002, and the government banned their publications in 2004 under pressure from Islamist groups.

In late 2006, ahead of the next general election, major political parties in Bangladesh actively courted Islamists to strengthen their chances of winning. The Awami League, traditionally secular, formed the Grand Alliance with diverse groups, including the radical Bangladesh Khelafat Majlis, and signed a controversial Memorandum of Understanding pledging Islamist-friendly policies like recognizing Qawmi madrasa degrees, allowing fatwas, and introducing a blasphemy law. Despite public backlash and the limited electoral strength of these Islamist groups, the AL defended the move as consistent with secularism, while the Bangladesh Nationalist Party campaigned as the sole protector of Islam—prompting observers to note the growing influence of Islamist forces in mainstream politics.

=== Under Sheikh Hasina (2009–2024) ===
The Awami League government under Prime Minister Sheikh Hasina has seen a gradual but notable shift toward Islamization. This Islamization has not stemmed from a deep ideological transformation, but rather from strategic political calculations driven by three main factors: the rise of Islamist social movements, intensifying political competition, and the transition to semi-authoritarian rule. The Awami League's shift toward incorporating Islamic elements has weakened its appeal to secular liberals, leading to a new phase in the fight for secularism in Bangladesh, according to Ali Riaz.

As the Awami League hold on power became increasingly reliant on authoritarian tactics following the controversial 2014 election, it further accommodated Islamist demands—removing secular content from textbooks, cracking down on "blasphemous" literature, and boosting support for madrassahs and mosque-based infrastructure. Despite Islamist parties never securing more than 6.3% of the national vote, the AL has used Islamization as a defensive legitimacy strategy to undercut accusations of being "anti-Islamic" and to outmaneuver political rivals. These developments illustrate that, in Bangladesh, Islamization by secular rulers is less about societal religiosity or ideological shifts and more about elite survival strategies in a competitive and increasingly authoritarian political environment.

=== Under Muhammad Yunus (2024–2026) ===
In August 2024, after the fall of Sheikh Hasina-led Awami League government through July Revolution, the Nobel laureate Muhammad Yunus-led interim government took power. It created a Constitutional Reform Commission which recommended changes to the constitution.

The BNP and the Jamaat-e-Islami have expressed differing views on the country's constitutional principles. While BNP supports restoring the principles of nationalism, socialism, democracy, and secularism as they existed before the 15th Amendment to the Constitution of Bangladesh, Jamaat-e-Islami advocates for replacing them with "absolute trust and faith in Almighty Allah" and religious values. Jamaat-e-Islami also opposes terms like "pluralism" and proposes a more religion-based framework for governance.

== Muslim family law ==
Muslim Personal Law in Bangladesh, rooted in Shariah, governs private life for Muslims, including marriage, divorce, maintenance, guardianship, inheritance, Waqf, preemption, and gifts. While not uniformly applied across all legal matters, its implementation in family and property law is sanctioned through legislation and court practice. Marriage is viewed as a civil contract with specific conditions and limitations, including rules on ellity and polygamy. Divorce may occur through mutual consent or court decree, with stipulations set under the Muslim Family Laws Ordinance 1961 and the Dissolution of Muslim Marriages Act, 1939.

Mahr is a mandatory component of marriage, symbolising respect for the wife. Inheritance laws are strictly regulated, with defined shares for heirs and conditions for wills, while Waqf refers to the permanent property endowment for religious or charitable purposes. The law also recognises the right of preemption in land transactions to preserve social harmony. Guardianship and maintenance laws emphasize parental duty and child welfare, guided by traditional interpretations and modern statutes.

== Islamization in education and society ==
=== Growth of Madrasa education ===
In 1971, at the time of the independence of Bangladesh, there were only a handful of madrasas. By 1990, one-third of all students were studying in some kind of madrasa.

In the 2020s, amid a nationwide decline in school enrollment, Bangladesh's madrasas have seen a notable rise in student numbers. This growth has been driven largely by prolonged economic hardship, educational disruptions from the COVID-19 pandemic in Bangladesh, and shifting parental preferences. While government-controlled Alia madrasas gained over 250,000 students between 2019 and 2023, general secondary schools lost over 1 million students. Private Qawmi madrasas also saw significant increases in their student population. The Sheikh Hasina-led Awami League government from 2009 to 2024 gave greater support and legitimacy to madrasa education in return for political support from the Islamist segment of the population. Prime Minister Sheikh Hasina stated that Bangladesh would be governed in line with the spirit of the Constitution of Medina. In 2018, the government recognized Dawra Degree from Qawmi madrasa as equivalent of a master's degree. In return, Hefazat-e-Islam Bangladesh awarded Sheikh Hasina the title of "Mother of Qawmi".

Experts and educationists attribute this trend to the affordability, residential facilities, and comprehensive in-class instruction offered by many madrasas, which reduce reliance on costly private tuition. Additionally, growing religious sentiment, dissatisfaction with the new national curriculum, and the perceived ability of madrasas to continue education during crises have also influenced this shift. The growth has also been accelerated through government patronage. Critics have accused Qawmi madrasas as having a "medieval religious curriculum and no government oversight".

Despite having fewer trained teachers, madrassas are gradually modernising with increased access to internet, multimedia tools, and computer education, further enhancing their appeal to families seeking both religious and general education within a cost-effective and values-based environment.

=== Social changes ===
Throughout the 1980s, the global rise of Islamism gained significant traction following two pivotal events in 1979: the Iranian Revolution and the Soviet invasion of Afghanistan. The Iranian Revolution validated the notion that Islam could serve as a political ideology, as theorized earlier by thinkers like Hassan al-Banna and Abul A'la Maududi. Meanwhile, the Afghan Jihad, backed by the United States, provided organizational and ideological strength to Islamist movements by framing the war as a religious crusade and mobilizing fighters globally through militarized madrassahs and Islamic charities. This ushered in a new era of transnational Islamist activism.

In Bangladesh, these global trends were compounded by domestic dynamics. Labor migration to the Persian Gulf and the Middle East since the late 1970s brought remittances and economic benefits but also led to the importation of conservative religious values. Returnee migrants, influenced by puritanical interpretations of Islam, often assumed influential roles in their rural communities, propagating more rigid religious norms and contributing to the broader process of Islamization in society.

At the societal level, traditional social institutions such as salish (village arbitration) and fatwa (religious edicts) were redefined. Once informal and secular in nature, salish evolved in the 1990s to include local clerics closely linked to Islamist political parties. These cleric-led salish increasingly targeted women and development organizations, serving as platforms to assert sharia over civil law and to challenge the state’s secular legal authority. Similarly, fatwas, which were historically rare and non-binding, began to be issued frequently and aggressively—often against women—for moral or ideological “offences.” Unlike earlier times, these fatwas were enforced through social pressure or even violence, with backing from Islamist political forces.

When the judiciary attempted to curb these practices in 2001, Islamists mobilized street protests, forcing a governmental retreat. Prominent leaders openly challenged the state's legal system, with statements declaring that fatwa should supersede constitutional law. These developments marked a significant shift in the balance between secular governance and religious authority, with Islamist forces increasingly asserting dominance over social and legal norms in Bangladesh.

=== Demographics ===
The Muslim population in Bangladesh was over 150.36 million according to the 2022 census which makes Muslims, 91.04% of the population in the country. Hinduism is the second largest religious affiliation in Bangladesh, with around 13.1 million people identifying themselves as Hindus out of 165.16 million people and making up about 7.95 per cent of the total population as second largest minority according to the recent 2022 census. About 1 million people in Bangladesh adhere to the Theravada school of Buddhism. Buddhists form about 0.63 per cent of the population of Bangladesh as per 2022 census. Christians numbering around half a million account for approximately 0.29 per cent of the total population and they are mostly an urban community.

In 1901, Hindus constituted roughly 33% of the population of what is now Bangladesh. At the outbreak of the 1965 India-Pakistan war, the Defense of Pakistan Ordinance, and later the Enemy (Custody and Registration) Order II, labeled Hindus as the "enemy" and expropriated their property. The 1974 census of Bangladesh showed that the population of Hindus had fallen to 13.5%. Even after independence, the Hindus were branded "Indian stooges" and untrustworthy citizens.

According to the 2001 Bangladesh census, there were around 11.82 million Hindus in Bangladesh constituting 9.6% of the population, which at the time was 123.15 million. The Bangladesh 2011 census states, that approximately 12.73 million people responded that they were Hindus, constituting 8.54% of the total 149.77 million. While 2022 Census of Bangladesh, put the number of Hindus in Bangladesh at 13.1 million out of total 165.1 million population, thus constituting 7.95% of the population. According to a report published by a local daily newspaper of Bangladesh, the Hindu population in the country has reduced by nearly one million between 2001 and 2011 period. The reduction mainly happened in nine districts – Bhola, Barisal, Jhalokati, Pirojpur, Bagerhat, Narail, Gopalganj, Rajbari and Manikganj. In 2013, Amnesty International reported that the rise of more explicitly Islamist political formations in Bangladesh during the 1990s had resulted in many Hindus being intimidated or attacked, and that fairly substantial numbers were leaving the country for India.

According to Pew Research Center data, a significant majority of Bangladeshi Muslims express strong support for the integration of sharia into their national legal framework. Approximately 82% of Muslims in Bangladesh believe that sharia should be the official law of the land, reflecting one of the highest levels of support for Islamic legal systems across South Asia. Regarding the origins of sharia, a majority (over 70%) of Bangladeshi Muslims consider it to be the revealed word of God rather than a human interpretation of divine principles. This belief is often associated with higher levels of religious observance; individuals who pray regularly are more likely to regard sharia as divinely ordained.

In terms of interpretive flexibility, 57% of Bangladeshi Muslims maintain that there is only one true understanding of sharia. However, a considerable minority (38%) believes that Islamic law should be open to multiple interpretations, indicating some degree of openness to pluralistic readings. Support for more severe corporal punishments under hudud laws is less unanimous: around 50% of Bangladeshi Muslims in favor of sharia support penalties such as cutting off the hands of thieves, while 44% support the death penalty for apostasy. These figures are markedly lower than those reported in neighboring Pakistan and Afghanistan.

=== Missing Hindus ===
From 1964 to 2013, around 11.3 million Hindus left Bangladesh due to religious persecution and discrimination, as stated by Dhaka university economist Abul Barkat. On average 632 Hindus left the country each day and 230,612 annually as reported by him. From his 30-year-long research, Barkat found that the exodus mostly took place during military governments after independence. Barkat also stated that "there should have been 28.7 million Hindus in the year 2013 instead of 12.2 million", or, to put it another way, Hindus should have accounted for 16-18% of Bangladesh's population, not 9.7% as they do currently. According to the United States Commission on International Religious Freedom, Hindus constitute merely 7% of the population in Bangladesh as per as the latest 2016 figures.

Utilizing demography studies and other methods over a 55-year period from 1947 to 2001, professor Sachi Dastidar of the State University of New York calculates that well over 49 million Hindus are missing today from Bangladesh. According to a report published by a local daily newspaper of Bangladesh, the Hindu population in the country has reduced by 1 million between 2001 and 2011 period. Ergo in the absence of partition in 1947 and other events that followed, It is estimated the present-day Bangladeshi hindu population would be approximately 63.13 million or 28%, well above the current population of 12.73 million or 8.5%, as reported in the Bangladesh 2011 census. Census data show the population of Tripura's 19 Scheduled Tribes dropped from 63.77% in 1881 to 31.78% in 2011. This is attributed to the migration of 6.10 lakh Bengalis – the figure almost equal to the State's total population in 1951 – from East Pakistan between 1947 and 1971. At present, there are around 2.2 million Bengali Hindus in Tripura (mostly having Eastern Bangladeshi origin), making them the largest ethnic group in the State, constituting around 60 per cent of the state population.

== Islamization and politics ==
Over the past two decades since its independence, Bangladesh has experienced a sharp increase in Islamist political parties, rising from 11 in 1970 to 100 by 2006. Participation in elections by such parties has also grown steadily, with at least 35 Islamist-oriented parties contesting between 1979 and 2001.

According to Ali Riaz, four categories of Islamist parties in Bangladesh operate publicly in mainstream politics, while the fifth category consists of secret militant groups. The four public categories include:

1. Pragmatist/opportunist parties like Bangladesh Jamaat-i-Islami;
2. Idealist and orthodox parties such as Bangladesh Khilafat Andolan and Nizam-e-Islam Party;
3. Pir-centric and Shrine-based groups like the Zaker Party; and
4. Urban elite-centric organizations like Hizb ut-Tahrir Bangladesh.

Underground militant groups, estimated to number between 29 and 53, include Harkat-ul-Jihad Bangladesh, Jama'atul Mujahideen Bangladesh, and Jagrata Muslim Janata Bangladesh, are all linked to the same network. A series of bombings in 2005 led to bans, arrests, and the execution of six militant leaders.

=== Bangladesh Jamaat-e-Islami ===
After the Independence of Bangladesh, religion-based politics was banned. The 5th amendment to the constitution of Bangladesh by General Ziaur Rahman allowed the return of religion based parties.

On 27 January 2009, the Supreme Court issued a ruling after 25 people from different Islamic organizations, including Bangladesh Tarikat Federation's Secretary General Syed Rezaul Haque Chandpuri, Zaker Party's Secretary General Munshi Abdul Latif and Sammilita Islami Jote's President Maulana Ziaul Hasan, filed a joint petition. Jamaat-e-Islami chief Motiur Rahman Nizami, Secretary General Ali Ahsan Mujaheed and the Election Commission Secretary were given six weeks time to reply, but they did not. The ruling asked to explain as to "why the Jamaat's registration should not be declared illegal". As a verdict of the ruling, High Court cancelled the registration of the Jamaat-e-Islami on 1 August 2013.

In 2010, the Awami League government banned books by Abul A'la Maududi, founder of the Islamist party Jamaat-e-Islami. The Supreme Court of Bangladesh revoked the 5th amendment, which would allow the government or the Election Commission to ban Bangladesh Jamaat-e-Islami. Abul Maal Abdul Muhith, Awami League politician, argued for a ban saying religious parities were "quite strident in their action and they have exaggerated the problem" instead of being "moderate in their use of religion in election campaigns.". Abdur Razzaq, a Bangladesh Jamaat-e-Islami politician, argued against a ban saying the "Islamic political parties have brought in a high degree of tolerance in politics. Politics has become much more civilized because of Islamic values".

On 5 August 2013, the Supreme Court rejected Jamaat's plea against the High Court. The chamber judge of the Appellate Division Justice AHM Shamsuddin Chowdhury Manik while rejecting the Jamaat's petition seeking stay on the High Court verdict, said that the Jamaat could move a regular appeal before the Appellate Division against the verdict after getting its full text.

In February 2013, following the verdict by the International Crimes Tribunal and the announcement of death sentence of Delwar Hossain Sayidee, a prominent leader of Jamaat-e-Islami, supporters of Bangladesh Jamaat-e-Islami and its student wing, Islami Chhatra Shibir were involved in the 2013 Bangladesh anti-Hindu violence and law enforcement killed 44 protesters and wounded 250. More than 50 temples were damaged, and more than 1,500 houses and business establishments of Hindus were torched in Gaibandha, Chittagong, Rangpur, Sylhet, Chapainawabganj, Bogra and in many other districts of the country, (Note: Multiple references:) By March 2013, more than 87 people were killed by the government's law enforcement agencies.

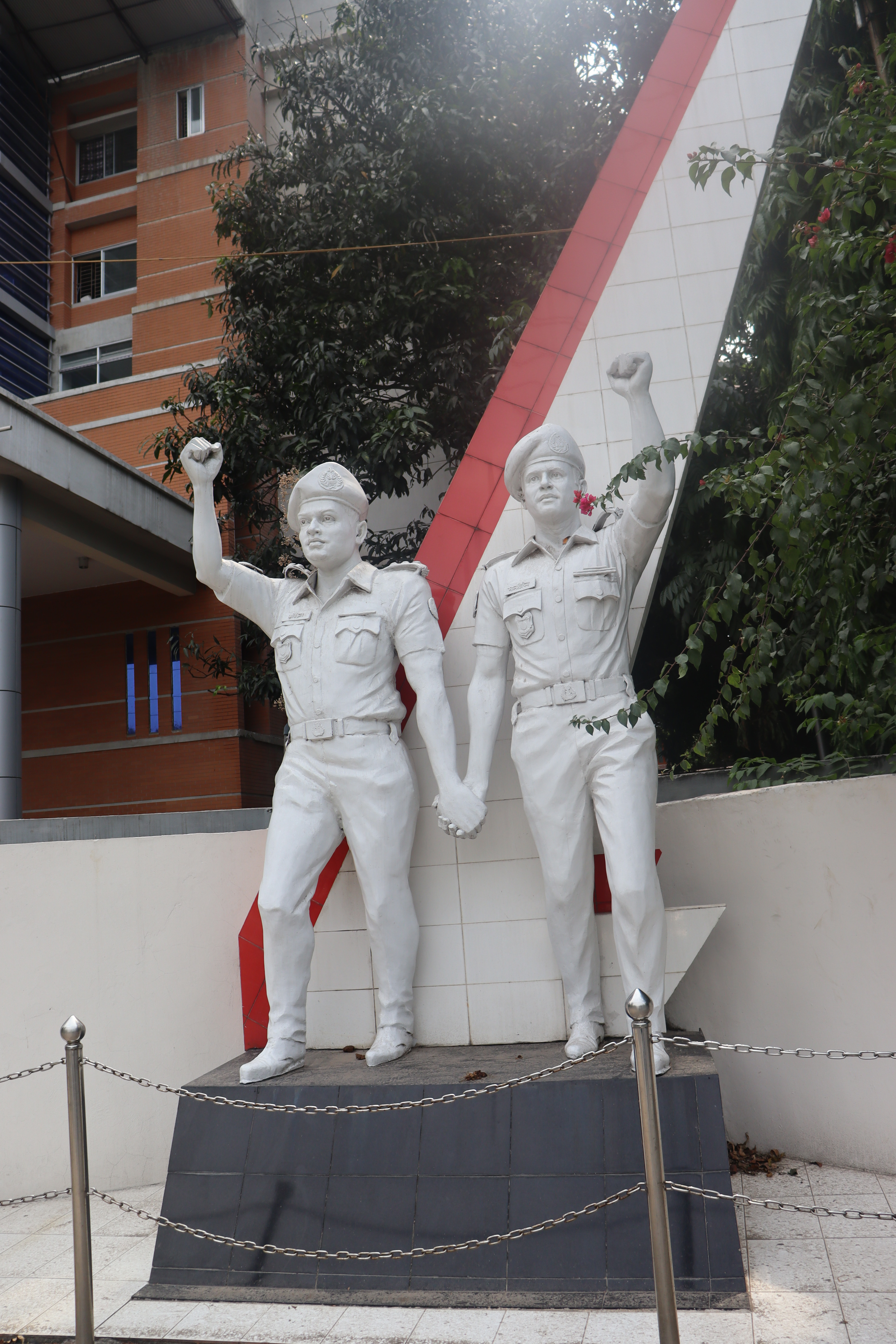
"Dipto Shopoth" by Mrinal Haque was demolished after the fall of Sheikh Hasina

The Sheikh Hasina-led government banned Jamaat-e-Islami a few days before being toppled by the student-led revolution. The Muhammad Yunus-led interim government reversed the ban after taking power.

=== Harkat-ul-Jihad-al-Islami Bangladesh ===
Harkat-ul-Jihad-al-Islam (HuJI) was founded in 1984 during the Soviet–Afghan War. HuJI Bangladesh was founded on 30 April 1992 in the Bangladesh National Press Club by Bangladeshi mujahideen veterans of the Soviet–Afghan War. The founder of the group was Maulana Abdus Salam. Since its founding, the group has been responsible for the deaths of over 100 people in various terrorist attacks. The group has been known to support the Rohingya insurgency in Western Myanmar. It allegedly has ties with the Rohingya Solidarity Organisation (RSO) and the Arakan Rohingya National Organisation (ARNO).

The founder of Harkat-ul-Jihad-al-Islami Bangladesh was Maulana Abdus Salam. Other well known leaders include Shaikhul Hadith Allama Azizul Haque, who was the chairman of the political party Islami Oikya Jote. Muhammad Habibur Rahman (alias Bulbuli Huzur) was a leader of Bangladesh Khelafat Majlish. The principal of Jamiatul Uloom Al-Islamia Lalkhan Bazar in Chittagong, Mufti Izharul Islam Chowdhury, was also a leader of the Harkat-ul-Jihad-al-Islami Bangladesh. Another leader of Harkat-ul-Jihad-al-Islami Bangladesh, Ataur Rahman Khan, was elected member of parliament from BNP.

Muhammad Habibur Rahman is a leader of Bangladesh Khelafat Majlis, Principal of the Slyhet Jameya Madania Islamia, and one of the organizers of the 2013 Shapla Square protests by Hefazat-e-Islam demanding blasphemy laws. He has also declared a reward for killing Taslima Nasreen. He received the Awami League nomination for elections to be held on 22 January 2007 as part of a coalition deal with Khelafat Majlis, which received heavy criticism from local Awami League leaders who threatened to resign en masse. Both were part of a team of Harkat-ul-Jihad-al-Islami Bangladesh which visited Afghanistan and met with Osama bin Laden. They had flown to Pakistan where they were hosted by Qari Saifullah Akhtar and were driven by Abdur Rahman Shahi, a Bangladeshi mujahadeen to Afghanistan.

=== Hizb ut-Tahrir ===
In October 2009, the Awami League government banned the Bangladeshi branch of Hizb ut-Tahrir, accusing it of destabilizing Bangladesh.

After the fall of the Sheikh Hasina-led Awami League government in August 2024, Hizbut Tahrir became more active and held rallies in Dhaka demanding the establishment of an Islamic caliphate. On 29 August, they demolished Dipto Shopoth, a sculpture by Mrinal Haque inaugurated in Gulshan in memory of the two policemen killed in the July 2016 Dhaka attack, and replaced with posters of the Hizb ut-Tahrir.

=== Hefazat-e-Islam ===
Hefazat-e-Islam was formed in 2010, as a pressure group comprising the teachers of several madrasas in Chittagong. Shah Ahmad Shafi, the former director of Hathazari Madrasa, Allama Junaid Babunagari, and Mufti Izharul Islam, the chairman of the Islamist party Islami Oikya Jote, Abdul Malek Halim, founder and principal of the first women's Qawmi madrasah (Haildhar Madrasah) in Bangladesh are regarded as the founders of Hefazat-e-Islam. The formation was allegedly triggered by the 2009 "Women Development Policy" draft. On 24 February 2010, Hefazat wanted to hold a rally at Laldighi Maidan, Chittagong to protest the government's move to slap a ban on religion-based politics, cancellation of the fifth amendment to the Constitution of Bangladesh, and a proposed education policy that would have ended madrasah education. The police refused their request to hold a rally and injured 19 protesters. A few of these madrasa students were arrested by police and later released. In 2011, Hefazat-e-Islam protested some aspects of the proposed Women Development Policy. According to The Economist, Hefazat was financed by doctrinaire Islamists in Saudi Arabia.

In 2013, Hefazat-e-Islam was reformed after the allegation that some of the protesters in the Shahbag protests were involved in publishing of content offensive to Muslims on blogs, including the depiction of the Islamic prophet Muhammad as a pornographic character. They arranged a rally towards capital city Dhaka, demanding enaction of capital punishment of the "atheist bloggers" involved in the Shahbag movement and a blasphemy law.

On 6 April 2013, Hefazat-e-Islam organised a long march towards the Motijheel area in Dhaka from Chittagong, Sylhet and Rajshahi to push for their 13-point demand. This was dubbed by some in the media as the "Siege of Dhaka". Awami League leader Nowsher Khan died of head injuries during a clash between his party activists and those of Hefazat-e Islam at Bhanga in Faridpur district. Hefazat supporters also attacked at a rally of Ekatturer Ghatak Dalal Nirmul Committee in Dhaka from their procession, injuring several people including a policeman. Hefazat supporters also attacked and injured Afsar Ahmed, the pro-vice chancellor of Jahangirnagar University, and reportedly threatened journalists.

On 5 May 2013, Hefazat arranged a rally in Dhaka, in the demand of their 13 points. On 4 May 2013, Hefazat activists gathered at all six entrance routes to Dhaka; creating a blockade, from dawn on 5 May 2013. At noon, with the permission of Dhaka Metropolitan Police, activists entered Dhaka and started moving towards Baitul Mukarram National Mosque in order to attend a prayer service. However activists of Hefazat-e-Islam were attacked by the ruling Awami League activists at various places using lethal arms such as pistols and guns who were using the Gulistan Road to reach Shapla Square. In return, Hefazat activists threw bricks at them. During the clashes, two television journalists were injured, apparently by Hefazat protesters. At about 3:00 pm while Hefazat leaders were delivering speeches, the Secretary General of Awami League, Sayed Ashraful Islam, at a press conference, threatened them to leave Dhaka. On the other hand, the opposition party, Bangladesh Nationalist Party (BNP) asserted that Hefazat members had a democratic right to assemble and articulate their cause. Hefazat supporters reportedly set fire to book stores located beside the south gate of the Baitul Mukarram during their program, inadvertently burning copies of Qurans, and assaulting two reporters. However, reports of this event are disputed, and Hefazat denies burning any books. According to Bangladesh Nationalist Party leader MK Anwar, the Qurans were burned by Debashish, a leader of the ruling party Awami League's volunteer wing, the Swechchhasebak League. Hefazat also denies the violent incidents of vandalism and arson attributed to it.

In the early hours of 6 May security forces, drawn from police, the elite Rapid Action Battalion and paramilitary Border Guard Bangladesh jointly launched an operation named "Operation Secure Shapla" to prevent Hefazat's violence by driving them out from Dhaka. At the beginning of the operation, police cut the power supply in the city's commercial area, but the total operation was broadcast live over several TV channels. During the course of the operations, two television channels, Diganta Television and Islamic TV, were shut down.

According to government estimates, the number of casualties in this operation was 11, including a few law enforcement members, while the Daily Star gave as little as 5 deaths. This figure was dismissed by Human Rights Watch and other news agencies. Hefazat and the BNP initially claimed that 2,000-3,000 had been killed in the operations. British journalist confirmed that at least 36 people had died. which is also rejected by government. According to The Economist, European diplomats, as many as 50 people were killed in Dhaka, which didn't provide any diplomat's name. Because of the differing views, Human Rights Watch called for an independent body to investigate the protest deaths. the poet and activist Farhad Mazhar said the government and media were making a cover-up and disinformation campaign. Human Rights Watch disputed opposition claims of 200 deaths, but agreed that a massacre had occurred. Amnesty International demanded that Bangladesh government set up an independent and impartial investigation immediately to look into police excesses. UN Secretary-General Ban Ki-moon voiced concern over the killing of unarmed protesters in Bangladesh and requested the government to sit with religious and political leaders.

On 6 May, the protests spread across the country. In Narayanganj, students and teachers of a local madrasa held protests and blockaded the Dhaka-Chittagong highway. In return, police fired several hundred gunshots, killing 27 people. In Hathazari Upazila, Chittagong, six people were shot dead by police. In Bagerhat, one Hefazat member died in a clash between protesters and police.

Over time, it developed a cooperative relationship with the Awami League government, gaining concessions such as recognition of Qawmi degrees and changes to school curricula. However, after the death of its moderate leader Shah Ahmad Shafi in 2020, hardliners took control and adopted an anti-government stance, including opposing statues of Sheikh Mujibur Rahman.

Hefazat-e-Islam Bangladesh led violent protests in March 2021 during Indian Prime Minister Narendra Modi’s visit to Bangladesh — a key ally of the then ruling Awami League. The unrest, which coincided with national celebrations, left 17 dead and caused widespread damage, prompting a government crackdown with hundreds arrested. The government, while cracking down on Hefazat following the violence, has not reversed its earlier concessions, reflecting a strategy of containment rather than confrontation. Hefazat dissolved its central committee and sought dialogue.

After the fall of the Sheikh Hasina led Awami League government, Hefazat-e-Islam joint secretary Mamunul Haque said they will establish Sharia law if they are voted to power. The group had opposed recommendations of the Women's Affairs Reform Commission, formed by the interim government, report for being against "Islamic family traditions" and "anti-Quran". They also demanded capital punishment for blasphemy. It demanded the disbandment of the Women's Affairs Reform Commission. It unveiled 12 demands at a rally in Dhaka, including mandatory Islamic education, and declaring Ahmadiyya non-Muslims. The rally was attended by Hasnat Abdullah, a leader of the student uprising against Sheikh Hasina, and the National Citizen Party (NCP).

== See also ==
- Saffronization
- Secularism in Bangladesh
- Conservatism in Bangladesh
- Bangladeshi nationalism
- Muslim nationalism in South Asia
- Islamization in Pakistan
