= White Paper: 2000 Days of Fundamentalist and Communal Violence in Bangladesh =

2022 publication

Swetpatra: Bangladeshe maulabadi sampradayika santraser 2000 din
- Language: Bengali
- Subject: Communal violence
- Genre: White paper
- Set in: Hefazat-e-Islam Bangladesh; Qawmi madrasa; Rohingya refugees in Bangladesh; July 2016 Dhaka attack; 2020 sculpture controversy in Bangladesh; 2021 Anti-Hindu violence in Bangladesh; 2021 Bangladesh anti-Modi protests
- Publisher: Public Commission to Investigate radical and Communal Terrorism in Bangladesh
- Publication date: February 2022
- Publication place: Bangladesh
- Media type: Hardcover; PDF

White Paper: 2000 Days of Fundamentalist and Communal Violence in Bangladesh (Bengali: শ্বেতপত্র: বাংলাদেশে মৌলবাদী সাম্প্রদায়িক সন্ত্রাসের ২০০০ দিন) is a white paper published in February 2022 by the People's Commission to Investigate radical and communal Terrorism in Bangladesh. To investigate the communal attacks and religious frenzy that took place in Bangladesh in February–March 2021, this public commission was formed by the joint initiative of the Ekattorer Ghatak Dalal Nirmul Committee and the Tribal and Minority Affairs Caucus of the Jatiya Sangsad.

In this white paper, 116 speakers associated with Islamist organizations and institutions are termed as 'religion traders' by raising various charges including financing of militants, spreading hatred, money laundering, communal terrorism, irregularities, corruption, extorting money in the name of Waz, and 1,000 madrassas under Hefazat-e-Islam Bangladesh were accused of radicalization. The 2,200-page investigation report has also mentioned the names of various religious groups including Hefazat and administrative officials including DC, OC who helped them and encouraged communal violence. The recommendation of the Swetpatra emphasized on filing a case against them.

After the Swetpatra was submitted to the Anti-Corruption Commission and the National Human Rights Commission on May 12, 2022, there was extensive discussion about it. Home Minister Asaduzzaman Khan said that the People's Commission has no basis. The day the Swetpatra was submitted, Islamic parties and organizations protested against it.

== Content ==
Published in 2 volumes, this Swetpatra begins with an introduction followed by a summary and recommendations of the larger white paper. In the third chapter, Hefazat-e-Islam Bangladesh and in the fourth chapter, militant organizations in Bangladesh and terrorist attacks on Gulshan Holy Bakery are reviewed. Articles related to Rohingya have been consolidated in the fifth chapter. Topics covered in the sixth chapter: Terrorism through social media: Review of various books, magazines and newsletters of militants online, offline, Communal terrorism through waz, spread of militancy and introduction of speakers. In the 7th chapter, the People's Commission's own 10 on-the-ground reports on the investigation into radical communal terrorism in Bangladesh and in the 8th chapter, the RAB report and the police report and the list of 1000 madrassas under custody are attached.

== Reactions ==
When discussions started on the Swetpatra after it was submitted to the Anti-Corruption Commission and the National Human Rights Commission, Home Minister Asaduzzaman Khan pointed out that the commission had no basis. He further said, "I don't even know on the basis of which information this Swetpatra has been prepared. Those in whose name they are responsible for terrorism or corruption—we didn't see that. So I can't say anything about it. We don't take into account allegations that have no evidence."

In response to various criticisms, the People's Commission said that the Swetpatra was never anti-Islamic. A 11-member delegation of Islami Cultural Forum Bangladesh against the People's Commission submitted a memorandum to the Anti-Corruption Commission seeking income-expenditure accounts of the leaders of the People's Commission, sources of their funds and assets of the committee leaders.
