= Police riot =

Riot caused by the police

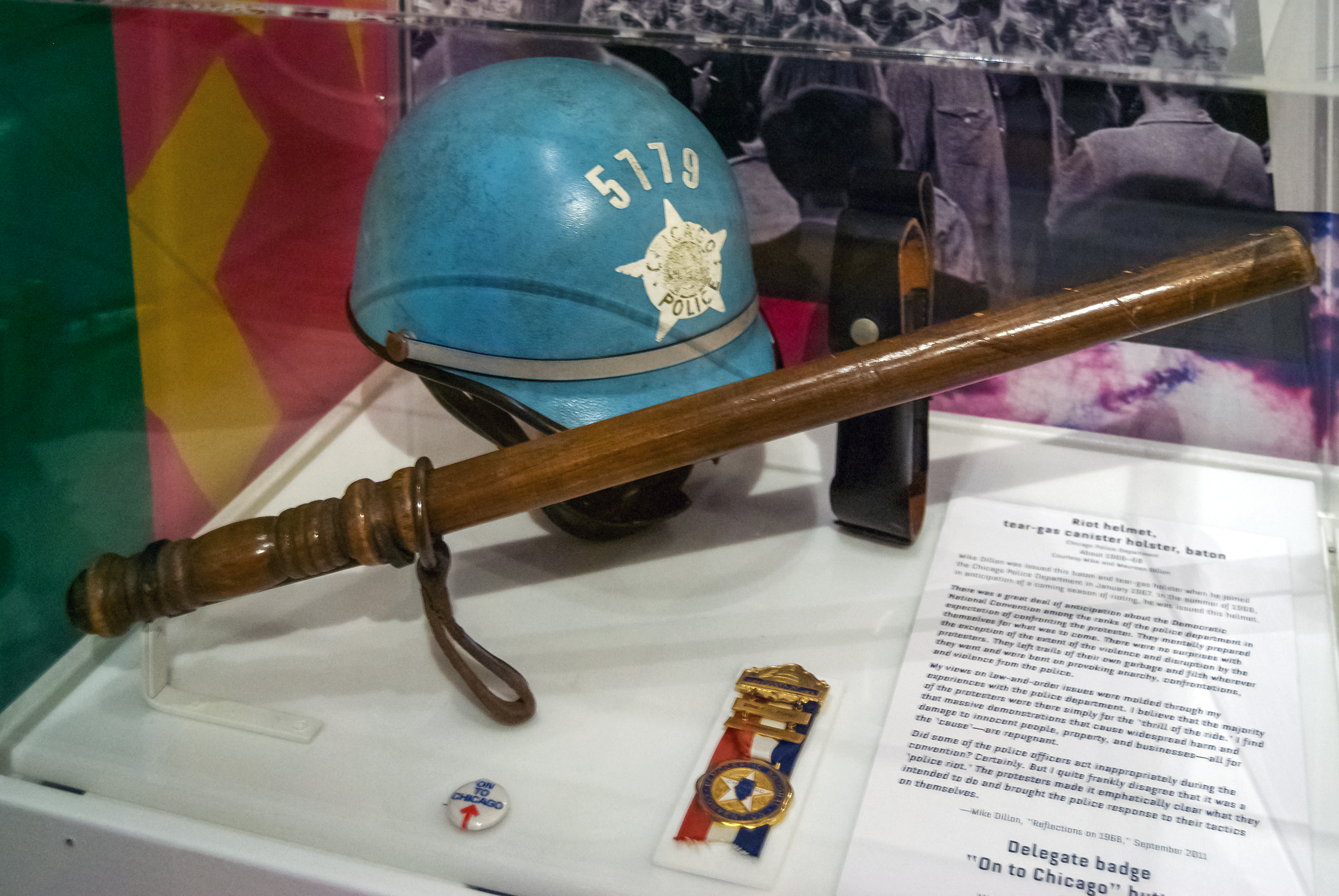
Helmet and baton used by Chicago police officers during the 1968 Democratic National Convention, where the term "police riot" was popularized

A police riot is a riot which is carried out by the police; more specifically, it is a riot that police are responsible for instigating, escalating or sustaining as a violent confrontation. Police riots are often characterized by widespread police brutality, and they may be done for the purpose of political repression.

The term "police riot" was popularized after its use in the Walker Report, which investigated the events surrounding the 1968 Democratic National Convention in Chicago to describe the "unrestrained and indiscriminate" violence that Chicago Police Department officers "inflicted upon persons who had broken no law, disobeyed no order, made no threat." During the 2020 George Floyd protests, columnist Jamelle Bouie wrote in The New York Times that a police riot is "an assertion of power and impunity" that "does more to inflame and agitate protesters than it does to calm the situation and bring order to the streets". There have also been cases where a police riot involved only the police, such as the 1857 clash between the New York Metropolitan Police and 300 policemen from the New York Municipal Police who were occupying City Hall, in which 52 policemen were injured.

== History ==
=== United States ===
==== Haymarket Riot ====
During the early years of labor union organizing, police violence was frequently used in efforts to quell protesting workers. One notable incident took place in May 1886, when police killed four striking workers at the McCormick Harvesting Machine Co. in Chicago. The following day, a peaceful demonstration in Haymarket Square erupted in violence when a bomb was thrown, killing eight policemen. Other police then opened fire, before or after they were fired on by people in the crowd (accounts vary) killing at least four demonstrators and wounding an undetermined number, in an event known as the Haymarket Riot.

==== Bloody Thursday ====
In July 1934, police in San Francisco were involved in several encounters with striking longshore workers. After two picketers were killed, the other area unions joined together and called a general strike of all workers (the "Big Strike"). Subsequent criticism of the police was probably the occasion for the coining of the term "police riot".

==== Vietnam War protests ====
During the Vietnam War, anti-war demonstrators frequently clashed with police, who were equipped with billy clubs and tear gas. The demonstrators claimed that the attacks were unprovoked; the authorities claimed the demonstrators were rioting. The most notorious of these assaults, which was shown on television and which included national television reporters in the chaos, took place during the August 1968 Democratic National Convention in Chicago, which was the scene of significant anti-war street protests. The actions of the police were later described as a police riot by the Walker Report to the U.S. National Commission on the Causes and Prevention of Violence.

==== White Night Riots ====
On May 21, 1979, in response to early demonstrations and unrest at San Francisco City Hall following the sentencing of Dan White for the killings of San Francisco Mayor George Moscone and Supervisor Harvey Milk, members of the San Francisco Police Department descended on the Castro District. With tape over their numbers they destroyed a gay bar and indiscriminately attacked civilians. Many patrons were beaten by police in riot gear, some two dozen arrests were made, and a number of people later sued the SFPD for their actions.

==== Tompkins Square Park police riot ====
In August 1988, a riot erupted in Tompkins Square Park in the East Village of New York City when police, some mounted on horseback, attempted to enforce a newly passed curfew for the park. Bystanders, artists, residents, homeless people, reporters, and political activists were caught up in the police action that took place during the night of August 6–7. Videotape evidence, provided by onlookers and participants, showed seemingly unprovoked violent acts by the police, as well as a number of officers having covered up or removed their names and badge numbers from their uniforms. The footage was broadcast on local television, resulting in widespread public awareness. In an editorial The New York Times dubbed the incident a "police riot".

==== Castro Sweep ====
On October 6, 1989, about 200 members of the San Francisco Police Department initiated a police riot in the Castro District following a peaceful march held by ACT UP to protest the United States government's actions during the ongoing AIDS pandemic. The event was the first large-scale confrontation between the city's LGBT community and the police since the White Night riots a decade earlier and resulted in 53 arrests and 14 people injured.

==== 1999 Seattle Protests ====
The term police riot has been applied by some to the 1999 Seattle WTO protests, where police clad in riot gear used clubs, tear gas and projectiles to disperse groups of protesters.

==== 2014 Ferguson protests ====
During the Ferguson unrest, police clad in riot gear used clubs, tear gas and rubber bullets to disperse crowds of protesters in Ferguson. Long Range Acoustic Devices and armored vehicles were heavily utilized to subdue protesters, and police threatened journalists and human rights workers on the scene. Some sources and observers described the event as a police riot, though the police denied any wrongdoing or police riot.

==== George Floyd protests ====
Police were accused in multiple cities of instigating unprovoked violence with persons who protested the murder of George Floyd in Minneapolis, Minnesota. Democratic Socialist Virginia State Rep. Lee J. Carter criticized police actions as a "police riot".

Videos from multiple cities showed police using tear gas, pepper spray, and rubber bullets on protesters. In Seattle, a line of police officers attacked a crowd of protesters when a protester would not relinquish her umbrella. In Richmond, Virginia, police ended four days of protest by attacking protesters with pepper spray; police later admitted it was an "unwarranted action" and mayor Levar Stoney apologized, saying "we violated your rights."

==== Racial patterns ====
===== Civilian characteristics =====
According to The Guardian's database, in 2016 the rate of fatal police shootings per million was 10.13 for Native Americans, 6.6 for black people, 3.23 for Hispanics; 2.9 for white people and 1.17 for Asians. In absolute numbers, police kill more white people than any other race or ethnicity, understood in light of the fact that white people make up the largest proportion of the US population. As a percentage of the U.S. population, black Americans were 2.5 times more likely than whites to be killed by the police in 2015. A 2015 study found that unarmed black people were 3.49 times more likely to be shot by police than were unarmed white people. Another study published in 2016 concluded that the mortality rate of legal interventions among black and Hispanic people was 2.8 and 1.7 times higher than that among white people. Another 2015 study concluded that black people were 2.8 times more likely to be killed by police than whites. They also concluded that black people were more likely to be unarmed than white people who were in turn more likely to be unarmed than Hispanic people shot by the police. A 2018 study in the American Journal of Public Health found the mortality rate by police per 100,000 was 1.9 to 2.4 for black men, 0.8 to 1.2 for Hispanic men and 0.6 to 0.7 for white men.

The table below gives recent CDC statistics showing the proportions of fatal police shootings and all firearm deaths by race.

Firearm deaths and fatal police shootings by race (for year 2019)
| | White | Black | Asian | Indigenous |
|---|---|---|---|---|
| Population | 255,040,203 | 46,599,393 | 21,814,724 | 4,785,203 |
| % of total | 77.7% | 14.2% | 6.6% | 1.5% |
| All firearm deaths | 28,041 | 10,555 | 679 | 432 |
| % of total | 70.6% | 26.6% | 1.7% | 1.1% |
| Fatally shot by police | 355 | 122 | 23 | 20 |
| % of total | 68.3% | 23.5% | 4.4% | 3.8% |

A 2016 working paper in the National Bureau of Economic Research by economist Roland G. Fryer, Jr. found that while overall "blacks are 21 percent more likely than whites to be involved in an interaction with police in which at least a weapon is drawn" and that in the raw data from New York City's Stop and Frisk program "blacks and Hispanics are more than fifty percent more likely to have an interaction with police which involves any use of force" after "[p]artitioning the data in myriad ways, we find no evidence of racial discrimination in officer-involved shootings." A 2020 study by political scientists disputed the findings by Fryer, saying that if police had a higher threshold for stopping whites, this might mean that the whites, Hispanics and blacks in Fryer's data are not similar. Nobel-laureate James Heckman and Steven Durlauf, both University of Chicago economists, published a response to the Fryer study, writing that the paper "does not establish credible evidence on the presence or absence of discrimination against African Americans in police shootings" due to issues with selection bias. Fryer responded by saying Durlauf and Heckman erroneously claim that his sample is "based on stops". Further, he states that the "vast majority of the data...is gleaned from 911 calls for service in which a civilian requests police presence."

=== United Kingdom ===
==== Battle of the Beanfield ====
During an attempt to enforce an exclusion zone around Stonehenge, Wiltshire, in 1985, the police entered the field where a group of travelers known as the Peace Convoy were being detained and began damaging their vehicles and beating the occupants. The travelers eventually sued the Wiltshire police force for wrongful arrest, assault and criminal damage.

== See also ==
- 2010 Thai political protests
- 2013 Bangladesh riot
- Black Act
- Black bloc
- Demonstration (people)
- Hooliganism
- Kristallnacht (November 9 & 10, 1938)
- Memorial Day massacre of 1937, aka the Republic Steel massacre
- Police brutality
- Stonewall riots (June 28 – July 1, 1969)
