= 2013 Bangladesh violence =

2013-2014 Bangladesh political violence
Date	2013-2014
Location	Bangladesh
Result	Government victory: Left wing politics increases; Bangladesh Jamaat-e-Islami went underground; Islamist insurgency continues

Belligerents
Government of Bangladesh: Awami League; Chhatra League; Leftist political groups: Bangladesh Students Union; Revolutionary Students Unity of Bangladesh; Socialist Students' Front	Islamist political groups: Bangladesh Jamaat-e-Islami; Bangladesh Islami Chhatrashibir; Hefazat-e-Islam Bangladesh	Jihadist groups: Ansarullah Bangla Team; Islamic State; Islamic State - Bengal Province

Commanders and leaders
Sheikh Hasina	Motiur Rahman Nizami (executed); Ghulam Azam # Delwar Hossain Sayedee	

Casualties and losses
		100-500 civilians dead, 5200 injured

2013 Bangladesh violence refers to the political instability, increase in crime and widespread attacks of minorities and opposition activists.

== Background ==
The year 2013 was one of the deadliest since Bangladesh's independence four decades earlier. Local sources reported that over 500 people were killed in political violence. Human Rights Watch noted that many people were killed and thousands were injured amid the political crisis surrounding upcoming elections and the conduct of war crimes trials. These acts of violence were perpetrated by Bangladesh police forces, the Rapid Action Battalion (RAB), and opposition parties. Human Rights Watch documented numerous serious violent acts by opposition party members and supporters. Additionally, Bangladesh's security forces, led by the ruling party, were involved in numerous extrajudicial killings.

== Shahbag protests ==
On 5 February 2013, protests erupted in Shahbagh, Dhaka, Bangladesh, in response to an International Crimes Tribunal's life imprisonment sentence for Abdul Quader Molla, a Bangladesh Jamaat-e-Islami leader convicted of war crimes during the 1971 Liberation War. Many Bangladeshis deemed the sentence too lenient, sparking mass demonstrations led by bloggers and online activists. Shahbagh Square became the heart of this movement, known as the Ganajagaran Mancha (Mass Awakening Platform), with participants from all walks of life demanding the death penalty and greater accountability for war criminals. The movement reignited national unity and highlighted issues of justice and human rights in Bangladesh.

== Clashes after Delwar Hossain Sayeedi verdict ==
=== Verdict on Delwar Hossain Sayeedi ===
On 28 February 2013, Thursday, the ICT, found Bangladesh Jamaat-e-Islami leader Delwar Hossain Sayeedi guilty of 8 out of 20 charges leveled against him including murder, rape and torture during the 1971 war of independence

=== Clashes ===
On Sunday and Monday, 3 and 4 March, Bangladesh Jamaat-e-Islami enforced a 48-hour hartal. Protests led by Jamaate Islami activists and Sayeedi supporters were carried out during these strikes. Bangladesh Nationalist Party supported the strike and called for another daylong strike on 5 March. Police shot dead 31 protestors during the initial clashes. According to Human Rights Watch, members of the Border Guards Bangladesh, and the Rapid Action Battalion (RAB) shot live ammunition and rubber bullets into unarmed crowds, which included children, conducted sweeping arrests and used other forms of excessive force during and after protests. One eyewitness recalling the death of his 17-year-old family member described how he was shot after walking back from afternoon prayers:

I saw [him] on the ground with blood coming from his head. I tried to drag his body to the side. It was the first time I had seen a dead body so I was in shock. They were still shooting, so I ran down the road. ... When the RAB officers stopped shooting they dragged [him] like a carcass and flung him into the car.

During the clashes a total of 80 individuals were shot dead by police. Police says that it did all these killings in "self defense."

=== Lawsuits ===
Police sued 98,000 people for committing violence and imposed Section 144 in several districts.

== Anti-Hindu violence ==
Map showing the places in Bangladesh where minority Hindus were attacked by the Islamist Jamaat-Shibir

After the verdict of Delwar Hossain Sayeedi, attacks on Hindu community occurred in several districts of Bangladesh including Noakhali, Lakshmipur, Chittagong, Comilla, Brahmanbaria, Cox's Bazar, Bagerhat, Gaibandha, Rangpur, Dinajpur, Lalmonirhat, Barisal, Bhola, Barguna, Satkhira, Chapainawabganj, Natore, Sylhet, Manikganj, Munshiganj. Several temples were vandalized. 2 Hindus died due to injuries in the violence. In a BBC News report, Anbarasan Ethirajan wrote that "the recent violence is mainly blamed on the opposition Jamaat-e-Islami party, whose leaders are facing war crimes at the tribunal. But the party - which opposed Bangladesh's independence from Pakistan - denies the charges." Amnesty International expressed concern on the anti-Hindu attacks and urged the government of Bangladesh to provide them with better protection. Abbas Faiz, Bangladesh Researcher of Amnesty International has said that, since the obvious risks the Hindu minority face in Bangladesh, these attacks were predictable.

== 2013 Shapla Square protests ==
On 5 May, mass protests took place at Shapla Square in the Motijheel area of capital Dhaka. The protests were organized by the Islamist pressure group, Hefazat-e Islam, who were demanding the enactment of a blasphemy law. The government responded to the protests by cracking down on the protesters using a combined force drawn from the police, Rapid Action Battalion and paramilitary Border Guard Bangladesh to drive the protesters out of Shapla Square.

Following the events at Motijheel, protests in other parts of the country also broke out, during which 27 people died, although different sources report casualty numbers ranging from 20 to 61. The opposition party BNP initially claimed thousands of Hefazat activists were killed during the operation, but this was disputed by the government. Human Rights Watch and other human rights organizations put the total death toll at above 50, but rights groups have termed the events as a massacre. Initial attempts to dispute the chain of events were thwarted due to the government closure of two television channels, Diganta Television and Islamic TV, which were live telecasting the operation.

== Attacks by Islamic extremists in Bangladesh ==
From 2013, attacks number of secularist writers, bloggers, and publishers and members of religious minorities such as Hindus, Buddhists, Christians, and Shias were killed or seriously injured in attacks that are believed to have been perpetrated by Islamist extremists. These attacks have been largely blamed by extremist groups such as Ansarullah Bangla Team and Islamic State of Iraq and Syria.

== 2013–2014 Satkhira clashes ==
A joint operation by Border Guards Bangladesh, Rapid Action Battalion and Bangladesh police took place in different places of Satkhira district to hunt down the activists of Bangladesh Jamaat-e-Islami. They began on 16 December 2013 and continued after the 2014 Bangladesh election. There are allegations that various formations of the Indian military participated in the crackdown, an allegation that Bangladesh government denies.

== Reactions ==
=== Domestic ===
Bangladesh Nationalist Party (BNP) has strongly condemned the action of law enforcement forces. The chairperson of BNP, Khaleda Zia, has termed the spate of deaths across the country as "genocide" and accused the government of oppressing the opposition parties. The BNP Acting Secretary General Mirza Fakhrul Islam Alamgir blamed the government for the ongoing hate attacks on the minorities (i.e. Hindu community) across Bangladesh. On the other hand, Bangladesh Foreign Minister Dipu Moni condemned reports of Jamaat-e-Islami activists attacking minority Hindus and their temples in different parts of the country. She said, "It is unfortunate and deplorable. The (Bangladesh) government will not tolerate any attempt to destabilize the country, or allow any breach of communal harmony."

=== International ===
Several international organizations have expressed their concern over the recent violence in Bangladesh as an aftermath of the verdict. Human Rights Watch urged restraint on all sides.

Recognizing the right of the people to protest, the United Nations deputy spokesman Eduardo del Buey said, "The Secretary-General [of the U.N.] recognizes the right of people to protest, and it's the responsibility of both the authorities and the people protesting to assure this is done in a very peaceful manner."

The United Kingdom has expressed sadness over the violence and the number of senseless and unnecessary deaths that have taken place across Bangladesh during the past few days. The British High Commissioner to Bangladesh, Robert Gibson, said, "I deplore the cruel and unwarranted attacks on places of worship and private property." He added, "This great achievement risks being undermined by the callous and unacceptable actions of a few. While every citizen has the right to mount a peaceful protest, intimidation and imposition of strikes disrupts the lives of all citizens and hampers the operation of legitimate business. This is sending a negative signal to the international community and those wishing to invest in Bangladesh." Canadian Foreign Affairs Minister John Baird also expressed Canada's concern for Bangladesh. The United States has also expressed their concern over the attacks on homes, temples and shops owned by Hindu community in Bangladesh and called government to ensure safety of its citizens.

== See also ==
- 2013 Shahbag protests
- Timeline of the 2013 Shahbag protests
- 2013 Bangladesh anti-Hindu violence
