= 2013 Shapla Square protests =

2013 mass protest in Bangladesh

Coordinates: 23.7265°N 90.4217°E

- Part of 2013 Bangladesh violence
- Date: 5 May 2013 – 6 May 2013 (1 day)
- Location: Dhaka
- Caused by: 2013 Bangladesh violence
- Goals: Enactment of blasphemy law; Stopping criticism of Islam.
- Methods: Sit-in; occupation of Shapla Square
- Result: Protesters barricading the Shapla Square shot; Reports of deaths of protesters in Shapla Square; Dozens of protesters killed on the morning of 6 May in Narayanganj and Bagerhat; Diganta Television and Islamic TV shut down.

Parties
| Government of Bangladesh; Bangladesh Police; Rapid Action Battalion; Awami League; Bangladesh Chhatra League | Hefazat-e-Islam Bangladesh |

Lead figures
| Sheikh Hasina; (Bangladesh) Muhiuddin Khan Alamgir; Benazir Ahmed | Shah Ahmad Shafi |

Casualties
- Deaths: 93 killed (Hefazat-e-Islam Bangladesh claims); 10-12 (government claims); 53-61 (Independent sources)

The Shapla Square protests (Bengali: শাপলা চত্বর আন্দোলন, romanized: Shapla Chattar Andolon), also known as Operation Flash Out by security forces, was the protests and subsequent shootings of protesters on 5 and 6 May 2013 at Shapla Square, located in the Motijheel district, the main financial area of Dhaka, Bangladesh. The protests were organized by the Islamist advocacy group, Hefazat-e Islam, who were demanding the enactment of a blasphemy law. The government, headed by then Prime Minister Sheikh Hasina responded to the protests by cracking down on the protesters using a combined force drawn from the Bangladesh Police, Rapid Action Battalion and paramilitary Border Guard Bangladesh to drive the protesters out of Shapla Square.

Following the events at Motijheel, protests in other parts of the country also broke out, during which 27 people died, although different sources report casualty numbers ranging from 20 to 61. Human Rights Watch and other human rights organizations put the total death toll at above 50. Initial attempts to dispute the chain of events were thwarted due to the government closure of two television channels, Diganta Television and Islamic TV, which were live telecasting the operation.

== Background ==
=== 13 point demand ===
In early 2013, Hefajat-e Islam emerged as a pressure group composed of madrassah teachers and students, led by Shah Ahmad Shafi, rector of Hathazari Madrasah. The group became particularly active after allegations surfaced that some protesters in the Shahbag protests were involved in the publishing of content offensive to Muslims on blogs, including the depiction of Muhammad as a pornographic character. On 6 April 2013, its supporters made a long-march to promote their 13-point charter, which included:

- Restoration the phrase "Complete faith and trust in the Almighty Allah" in the nation's constitution;
- Enact a blasphemy law;
- Taking measures for punishment of "atheist bloggers" who led the Shahbagh movement, and against anti-Islam activists who made "derogatory remarks" against the Muhammad;
- Stopping "infiltration of all 'alien-culture', in the name of individual's freedom of expression, including free mixing of male and female" and candle lighting. Stopping harassment of women, open fornication and adultery, sexual harassment, all forms of violence against women and an end to the tradition of dowry;
- Make Islamic education mandatory from primary to higher secondary levels, cancelling the women's, and anti-religion, education policy;
- Declaration of Ahmadiyyas as non-Muslim;
- Stopping the erection of statues to be popularly venerated, such as by the placement of flowers;
- Lifting government restrictions on access to mosques across the country, including Baitul Mukarram National Mosque;
- Stopping Islamophobic content in media;
- Stopping activities by NGOs in the Chittagong Hill Tracts where Hefazat feared a "foreign conspiracy" to make a separate Christian state in that area;
- Stop the extrajudicial killing of ulema;
- Stopping the harassment of teachers and students of Qawmi madrassas and ulema;
- Release of all ulema, and madrassa students, that had been arrested and the withdrawal of all cases filed against them, compensation for the victims, and bringing the assailants to justice.

The government responded by saying that it had "already met" many of the group's demands. This included the arrest of four bloggers for making derogatory comments against Muhammad.

=== Human Rights Watch warning ===
On 3 May 2013, Human Rights Watch issued warnings, based on information obtained from diplomatic missions regarding an imminent government crackdown, to security forces against committing excesses in the planned upcoming protests. It also urged the government to appoint an independent commission to investigate the killing of civilians since February, and prosecute those responsible for unlawful killings and use of force.

== Protests ==
=== 5 May ===
Hefazat-e-Islam organized a protest on 5 May demanding a trial of "atheist bloggers", and new legislation for the punishment for blasphemy. On 5 May 2013, Hefazat activists blockaded all six entrance routes to Dhaka from dawn.

At noon, with the permission of Dhaka Metropolitan Police (DMP), activists entered Dhaka and started moving towards Baitul Mukarram Mosque to attend a prayer service. However, activists of Hefazat-e- Islam were attacked en route by armed Awami League activists, who were using the Gulistan Road to reach Shapla Square. In self defense, Hefazat activists counterattacked with bricks. During the clashes, two television journalists were injured, apparently by Hefazat protesters. At about 3:00 pm, while Hefazat leaders were delivering speeches, the Secretary General of the Awami League, Sayed Ashraful Islam, demanded, via press conference, that they leave Dhaka. The opposition party, Bangladesh Nationalist Party (BNP) countered by asserting that Hefazat members had a democratic right to assemble and articulate their cause. During the unrest, Hefazat protesters allegedly attacked the offices of the Communist Party of Bangladesh at Motijheel. Hefazat claimed that their workers were unarmed and had come under attack by the police and Bangladesh Chhatra League activists at Gulistan, Purana Paltan and Baitul Mukarram, and in front of the Communist Party offices. Hefazat supporters reportedly vandalized at least 50 vehicles and several buildings during their rally. They violently attacked others in front of the Awami League headquarters at Paltan, Dhaka, and allegedly set fire to a number of book stores near the Baitul Mukarram mosque.

=== 6 May ===
By nightfall, many of the demonstrators had left the city, but about 50,000- 70,000 still remained in Shapla Square. After 10 pm, Prime Minister Sheikh Hasina reportedly gave the initial order to launch an operation at Shapla Square. Acting on that directive, law enforcement agencies cut electricity at 1:45 am and launched a coordinated crackdown, leaving one exit open. Hefazat members held prayers at the square and were addressed by their leaders. At around 2.15 am on 6 May, security forces cut power to the area. At 2:30 a.m. about 5000 members of the security forces launched "Operation Shapla", or "Operation Flash Out", to remove them. The forces included members of the Bangladesh Police, RAB, and BGB. At first, they used megaphones, asking the protesters to leave the area peacefully. Then, moving in from three directions via Dainik Bangla, Fakirapool and the Bangladesh Bank intersection, security forces used tear gas, rubber bullets, and sound grenades to disperse the demonstrators. Most fled the area, but others hid in side streets and buildings, where they were shot down by security forces. Hefazat alleged that the bodies were then picked up by garbage trucks and dumped outside the city. Ahmad Shafi was escorted away from a madrassa in Dhaka and flown to Chittagong.The police insisted he was not arrested but was leaving voluntarily.

On the following morning, the protests spread across the country. In Narayanganj, students and teachers of a local madrasa held protests and blockaded the Dhaka-Chittagong highway. In return, police fired on the protesters, killing 27. In Hathazari Upazila, six people were shot dead by police, while in Bagerhat, a Hefazat member died in a clash between protesters and police.

== Casualties ==
According to government estimates, the number of casualties in this operation was 11, including a few law enforcement members, while the Daily Star reported 5 deaths. Opposition parties initially claimed that 2000- 3000 of protesters had been killed, while Hefazat claimed about 1000 deaths. Human Rights Watch disagreed with Hefazat's claims.

Some victims were bystanders, including a number of shopkeepers near the Baitul Mukarram, while most were Hefazat supporters, including children, who were killed by a blow to the head or gunshot wounds. Doctors at the Dhaka Medical College Hospital confirmed that many of those dead had been shot in the head. One policeman was also attacked in reprisal. According to Human Rights Watch, eyewitnesses saw 25-30 bodies that were confirmed dead. This included British activist and journalist David Bergman, who saw 24 bodies. The Guardian reported 22 confirmed deaths, while an investigation conducted by Aljazeera revealed that 14 bodies of "bearded men" with gunshot wounds were buried, after the protests, at Dhaka's state-run cemetery. Human rights group Odhikar reported 61 deaths, but refused to reveal the names of the victims out of security concerns for their families. The UK Home Office estimates a total of no fewer than total of 50 deaths. Many individuals, including orphan children, were missing, which may have contributed to the discrepancies in casualties.

Because of the differing views, Human Rights Watch called for an independent body to investigate the protest deaths. Amnesty International demanded that Bangladesh government set up an independent and impartial investigation immediately to look into police excesses.

On 19 August 2024, the organization Odhikar released a list of 61 individuals who were killed by law enforcement during the protests.

On 6 May 2025, Hefazat-e-Islam Bangladesh published a list of 93 individuals who were killed during the event.

== Censorship ==
Diganta TV and Islamic TV were broadcasting live footage of the raid on Motijheel when they were forced off-air on the dawn of 6 May. Diganta Television's chief reporter M. Kamruzzaman said that around 25 plain-clothed policemen and an official from the broadcast commission had entered their studios without warning. According to the Bangladesh Telecommunication Regulatory Commission (BTRC), the channels' reporting on raid on Hefazat-e-Islam Bangladesh contained "exaggerated things, (had) given misinformation and called for breaking the law and attacking the law enforcers." Critics have accused the Sheikh Hasina government of using the Islamist issue to silence dissidents.

== Reactions ==
=== Domestic ===
==== Government ====
In response to the massacre allegations, police claimed the operation resulted in “zero casualty” while 14 party leaders claimed it to be "bloodless." Bangladeshi foreign minister Dipu Moni downplayed reports of inaccuracy in government figures and added that "most of the people in the country doesn't even think that there was any controversy with the matter." On 19 June, Prime Minister Sheikh Hasina rejected the allegations, stating in Parliament

... and that day's event was fully televised, you have seen how they have rubbed red dye onto their bodies and when police came and called them they got up and ran away ... we saw that dead bodies made a run for it! This kind of drama has been made there.

She also blamed the attack on her arch rival Khaleda Zia, claiming: “She (Khaleda) is the instigator, she is the issuer of order.” Awami League politicians blamed the BNP, Jamaat and ISI of backing the protests. Hefazat was also criticized for bringing minors, who were also attacked by law enforcement agencies during the operation, to the protests.

==== Opposition ====
The opposition Bangladesh Nationalist Party compared the attacks to the Pakistani crackdown on 25 March and Jalianwala Bagh massacres. BNP leader M.K. Anwar called it a "disastrous killing." In response, the Detective Branch of Bangladesh Police raided the houses of BNP convener Sadeque Hossain Khoka and Bangladesh Jatiya Party chairman Andaleeve Rahman Partha.

==== Hefazat-e-Islam ====
While some Hefzat activists vowed "revenge" after the killings, Hefazat amir Shah Ahmad Shafi appealed for calm and called a general strike all over Bangladesh on 12 May 2013.

==== Others ====
On 10 June 2013, human rights group Odhikar, published a fact finding report claiming 61 deaths, but refused to provide any names of the victims report, citing security concerns for the families of the victims. The Ain O Shalish Kendro demanded impartial investigation "to deal with them (Hefazat-e-Islam) more strategically and responsibly."

=== International ===
UN Secretary-General Ban Ki-moon voiced concern over the killing of unarmed protesters in Bangladesh and requested the government to sit with religious and political leaders. US ambassador, Dan Mozena, has cautioned that all groups and individuals have rights to protest.

=== Lawsuits ===
The government filed 12 cases against Hefazat-e Islam leaders for murder, vandalism, arson and destruction of properties and other charges. Hefazat denies the charges.

On 27 June 2013, Martin F. McMahon & Associates, a US law firm representing two US-based organisations, Human Rights and Development for Bangladesh and Bangladeshi-Americans in Greater Washington DC, filed cases in the International Criminal Court against 25 Bangladeshi ministers and security officials, including Prime Minister Sheikh Hasina for alleged "torture, forced disappearance, extrajudicial executions and mass killings", Ahmed Ziauddin, a Brussels based Bangladeshi lawyer who was accused of influencing the proceedings of Bangladesh's International Crimes Tribunal at the instruction of Bangladesh government, stated- "I am not sure about the objective of it and I am sure those Washington-based organisations have some political motives. They may have been trying to create political hype since filing a complaint in the ICC does not mean proceedings of a case will start immediately"

On 10 August 2013, police raided the offices of Odhikar and arrested its general secretary, Adilur Rahman Khan. In a press briefing, police officials said they found the list of 61 deaths and released it to the media. In a press statement, the US Department of State expressed deep concern over the arrest and demanded his immediate release.

== Trial and legacy ==
After the July Uprising in 2024, the International Crimes Tribunal set up a probe into the 2013 crackdown and massacre at Shapla Square. The probed named the then Prime Minister Sheikh Hasina as the person who directly ordered the massacre. The charges also named Awami League General Secretary Obaidul Quader, former ministers Rashed Khan Menon and Hasan Mahmud, and former Dhaka South mayor Sheikh Fazle Noor Taposh, former advisers to the Prime Minister Salman F Rahman and Tarique Ahmed Siddique, former army chief Aziz Ahmed, and several media executives including Mozammel Haque Babu.

In October 2025, the advisor for Local Government and Rural Development, Asif Mahmud provided financial assistance worth Taka 7.7 crore to the families of those killed during the massacre and the 2021 anti-Modi protests. He also announced plans to build a memorial at Shapla Square.

== See also ==
- 2013 Shahbag protests
- List of massacres in Bangladesh
