= Nadia Sharmeen =

Bangladeshi journalist

- নাদিয়া শারমিন
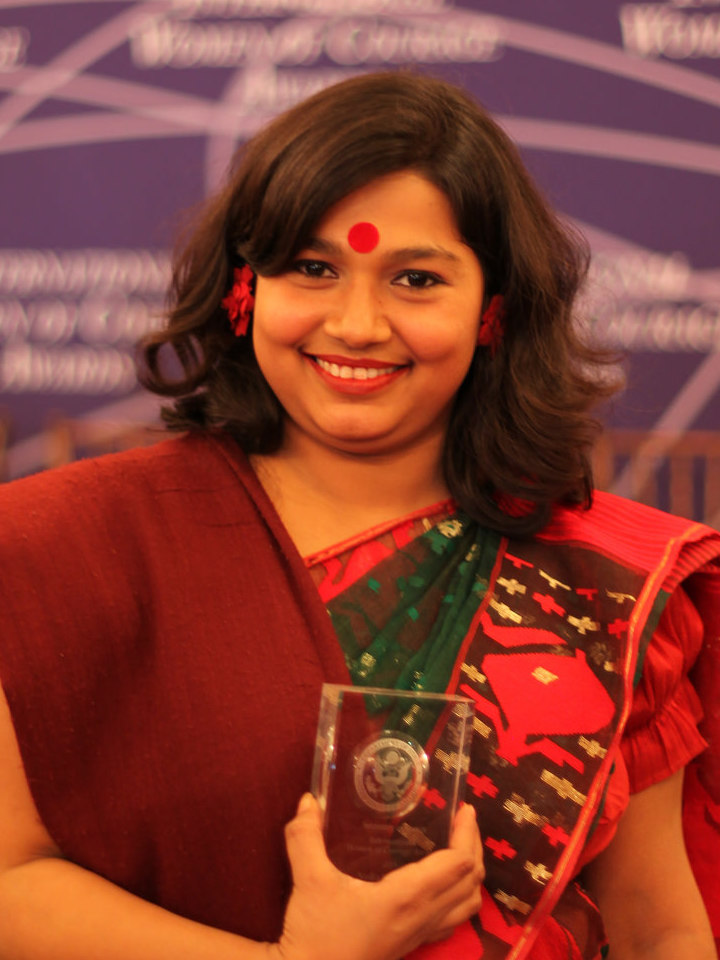
- Sharmeen holding her International Women of Courage Award (March 2015)
- Occupation: Journalist
- Employer: Ekattor TV
- Awards: International Women of Courage Award, 2015

Nadia Sharmeen (Bengali: নাদিয়া শারমিন) is a Bangladeshi journalist. In 2015, she won the US State Department's International Women of Courage Award.

== Biography ==
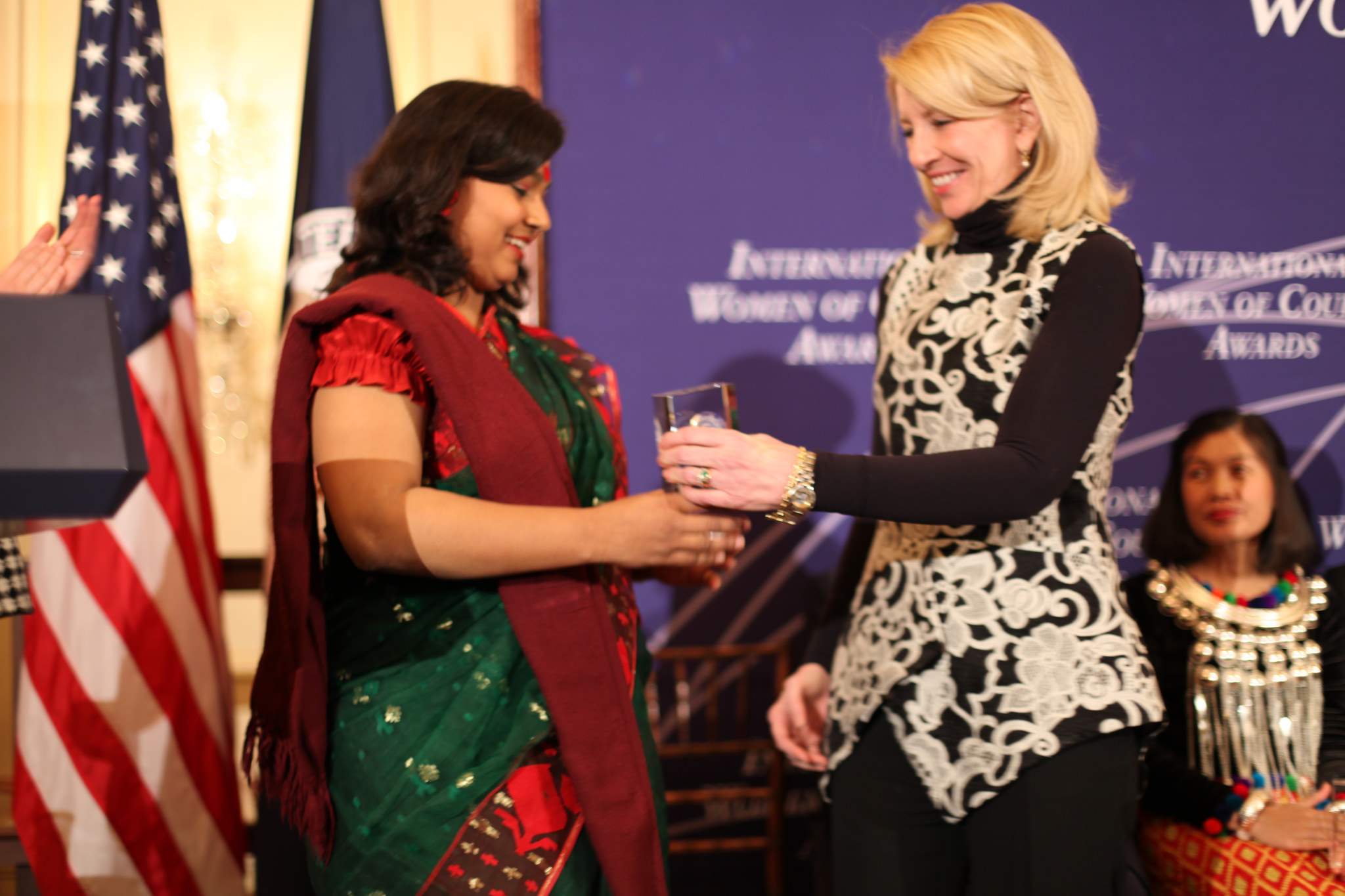
Sharmeen receiving the IWOC Award in 2015

From the time she was in Middle School, Sharmeen wanted to become a journalist. In 2009, she joined the Bangladesh press corps and became a crime reporter.

In 2013, Sharmeen was covering an Islamist organisations rally for her employer Ekushey Television, when she was attacked by the Hefazat-e-Islam activists. The rally was being held to demand restrictions on the open association of males and females in the same space, punishment of atheists, wearing of scarves by women, and other religiously based precepts. The Hefazat activist's 13-point demand list specifically called for the government to abandon the current Women's Policy, which had been designed to create gender equality. While there were no reported incidents of violence between activists and police, journalists were attacked and tortured in many places in Dhaka and Chittagong, as were women garbage collectors. Sharmeen's attackers targeted women who were not wearing the hijab. Nadia believed she was attacked, "only because I am a woman".

The 50-60 men who attacked chased her and pelted her with water bottles and pieces of brick. When she fell, others punched and beat her. Several male reporters and cameramen tried to save her and themselves became targets of the mob.

Sharmeen was rushed to Dhaka Medical College and Hospital for emergency treatment and once stabilized was moved to Bangabandhu Sheikh Mujib Medical University Hospital. Within days, a report was filed with the thana, but no arrests had occurred as late as July, 2013 when Human Rights and Peace for Bangladesh petitioned the high court for relief for Sharmeen. The court called for arrest of the perpetrators and ruled that the government was responsible for covering her medical care, whether inside the country or abroad Nearly two years after the event, no identifications nor arrests have occurred.

After her recovery, Sharmeen returned to work as a crime reporter for a different news agency. She now works at Ekattor TV. Her attack has strengthened the resolve of women's rights activists, who immediately following the assault staged several rallies, with the support of various press clubs, the Bangladesh National Women Lawyers Association (BNWLA) and other organizations. In 2014, her story was used as part of the global campaign One Billion Rising for Justice by activists to urge the Bangladeshi government to implement CEDAW protections.
