= Bangladeshi society =

The region had been a part of Bangla, Bengali: বাংলা/বঙ্গ, whose history dates back to four millennia, and during the British period it formed the Bengal province, the eastern part of the British Indian Empire, which was dominated by the British rulers and Hindu professional, commercial, and landed elites. After the establishment of Pakistan in 1947, present-day Bangladesh came under the hegemony of the non-Bengali Muslim elites of the West Wing of Pakistan. The establishment of Bangladesh, therefore, implied the formation of both a new nation and a new social order.

== Social history ==
Until the partition of British India in 1947, Hindus controlled about 80 percent of all large rural holdings, urban real estate, and government jobs in East Bengal and dominated finance, commerce, and the professions. Following partition, a massive flight of East Bengali Hindus effectively removed the Hindu economic and political elite and cut the territory's ties to Calcutta. After the emigration of the Hindus, Muslims moved quickly into the vacated positions, creating for the first time in East Bengal an economy and government predominantly in Muslim hands. These vastly increased opportunities, especially in the civil service and the professions, however, soon came to be dominated by a West Pakistani-based elite whose members were favoured by the government both directly and indirectly. Soon after independence in 1971, an ill-prepared Bangladeshi elite moved into the areas vacated by West Pakistanis. Except for members of small non-Bengali caste-like Muslim groups known as "trading communities," (Arrien) Bangladeshi Muslims almost immediately established control over all small- and medium-sized industrial and commercial enterprises. The 1972 nationalization of non-Bengali-owned large industries accelerated the establishment of control and influence by the indigenous community.

The sudden rise of a new managerial class and the expansion of the civil and military bureaucracy upset the balance in both the urban and the rural sectors. Party affiliation, political contacts, and documented revolutionary service became the main prerequisites for admission to the rapidly growing new elite of political and industrial functionaries; the established middle class and its values played lesser roles. In the countryside, new elites with links to the villages bought property to establish their sociopolitical control. Also taking advantage of the situation, the rural political elite amassed fortunes in land and rural-based enterprises. The result was the growth of a new, land-based, rural elite that replaced many formerly entrenched wealthy peasants (in Bengali, jotedars).

== Rural society ==
The basic social unit in a village is the family (poribar or gushti), generally consisting of a complete or incomplete patrilineally extended household (chula) and residing in a homestead (bari). The individual nuclear family often is submerged in the larger unit and might be known as the house (ghor). Above the bari level, patrilineal kin ties are linked into sequentially larger groups based on real, fictional, or assumed relationships.

A significant unit larger than that of close kin is the voluntary religious and mutual benefit association known as "the society" (shomaj or milat). Among the functions of a shomaj might be the maintenance of a Mosque and support of a mullah. An informal council of shomaj elders (matobbors or shordars) settles village disputes. Factional competition between the matobbors is a major dynamic of social and political interaction.

Groups of homes in a village are called Paras, and each para has its own name. Several paras constitute a mauza, the basic revenue and census survey unit. The traditional character of rural villages was changing in the latter half of the 20th century with the addition of brick structures of one or more stories scattered among the more common thatched bamboo huts.

Although farming has traditionally ranked among the most desirable occupations, villagers in the 1980s began to encourage their children to leave the increasingly overcrowded countryside to seek more secure employment in the towns. Traditional sources of prestige, such as landholding, distinguished lineage, and religious piety were beginning to be replaced by modern education, higher income, and steadier work. These changes, however, did not prevent rural poverty from increasing greatly. According to the FY 1986 Household Expenditure Survey conducted by the Ministry of Planning's Bureau of Statistics, 47 percent of the rural population was below the poverty line, with about 62 percent of the poor remaining in extreme poverty. The number of landless rural laborers also increased substantially, from 25 percent in 1970 to 40 percent in 1987.

== Urban society ==
In 1988 about 18 percent of the population lived in urban areas, most of which were villages or trade centres in rural areas. Urban centres grew in number and population during the 1980s as a result of an administrative decentralization program that featured the creation of upazilas. In appearance these small urban areas were not really hygienic. Most of the urban population merely congregated in ramshackle structures with poor sanitation and an almost total lack of modern amenities. Towns were populated mostly by government functionaries, merchants, and other business personnel. Most dwellings contained nuclear families and some extended family lodgers. A few households or a neighbourhood would constitute a para, which might develop some cohesiveness but would have no formal leadership structure. With the exception of a small number of transients, most town populations consisted of permanent inhabitants who maintained connections with their ancestral villages through property or family ties. Most towns had social and sporting clubs and libraries. Unlike in the rural areas, kinship ties among the town population were limited and fragile.

== Family, household, and kinship ==
Family and kinship are the core of social life in Bangladesh. A family group residing in a bari functions as the basic unit of economic endeavour, landholding, and social identity. In the eyes of rural people, the chula defined the effective household—--an extended family exploiting jointly-held property and being fed from a jointly operated kitchen. A bari might consist of one or more such functional households, depending on the circumstances of family relationship. Married sons generally live in their parents' household during the father's lifetime. Although sons usually build separate houses for their nuclear families, they remain under their fathers' authority, and wives under their mothers-in-law's authority. The death of the father usually precipitates the separation of adult brothers into their own households. Such a split generally causes little change in the physical layout of the bari, however. Families at different stages of the cycle display different configurations of household membership.

Patrilineal ties dominate the ideology of family life, but in practice matrilineal ties are almost as important. Married women provide especially important links between their husbands' brothers' families. Brothers and sisters often visit their brothers' households, which are in fact the households of their deceased fathers. By Islamic law, women inherit a share of their fathers' property and thus retain a claim on the often scanty fields worked by their brothers. By not exercising this claim, however, they do their brothers the important service of keeping the family lands in the patrilineal line and thus ensure themselves a warm welcome and permanent place in their brothers' homes.

A woman begins to gain respect and security in her husband's or father-in-law's household only after giving birth to a son. Mothers therefore cherish and indulge their sons, while daughters are frequently more strictly disciplined and are assigned heavy household chores from an early age. In many families the closest, most intimate, and most enduring emotional relationship is that between mother and son. The father is a more distant figure, worthy of formal respect, and the son's wife may remain a virtual stranger for a long time after marriage.

== Marriage ==
Marriage is a civil contract rather than a religious sacrament in Islam (see Islamic marriage contract), and the parties to the contract represent the interests of families rather than the direct personal interests of the prospective spouses. In Bangladesh, parents ordinarily select spouses for their children, although men frequently exercise some influence over the choice of their spouses. In middle-class urban families men negotiate their own marriages. Only in the most sophisticated elite class does a woman participate in her own marriage arrangements. Marriage generally is made between families of similar social standing, although a woman might properly marry a man of somewhat higher status. Financial standing came to outweigh family background in the late 20th century in any case. Often a person with a good job in a Middle Eastern country is preferred over a person of highly regarded lineage.

Marriages are often preceded by extensive negotiations between the families of the prospective bride and groom. One of the functions of the marriage negotiations is to reduce any discrepancy in status through financial arrangements. The groom's family ordinarily pledges the traditional cash payment, or bride-price, part or all of which can be deferred to fall due in case of divorce initiated by the husband or in case the contract is otherwise broken. As in many Muslim countries, the cash payment system provides women some protection against the summary divorce permitted by Islam. Some families also adopt the Hindu custom of providing a dowry for the bride.

Of the total population in 1981, an estimated 34 million were married. A total of 19 million citizens of marriageable age were single or had never married, 3 million were widowed, and 322,000 were divorced. Although the majority of married men (10 million) had only one wife, there were about 580,000 households, between 6 and 10 percent of all marriages, in which a man had two or more wives.

Although the age at marriage appeared to be rising in the 1980s, early marriage remained the rule even among the educated, and especially among women. The mean age at marriage in 1981 for males was 23.9, and for females 16.7. Women students frequently married in their late teens and continued their studies in the households of their fathers-in-law. Divorce, especially of young couples without children, was becoming increasingly common in Bangladesh, with approximately one in six marriages ending in this fashion in the 1980s.

Typical spouses know each other only slightly, if at all, before marriage. Although marriages between distant kin occur, segregation of the sexes generally keep young men and women of different households from knowing each other well. Marriage functions to ensure the continuity of families rather than to provide companionship to individuals, and the new bride's relationship with her mother-in-law is probably more important to her well-being than her frequently impersonal relationship with her husband.

== Purdah ==
As of 1988, the practice of purdah (the traditional seclusion of women) varied widely according to social milieu, but even in relatively sophisticated urban circles the core of the institution, the segregation of the sexes, persisted. In traditional circles, full purdah required the complete seclusion of women from the onset of puberty. Within the home, women inhabited private quarters that only male relatives or servants could enter, and a woman properly avoided or treated with formal respect even her father-in-law or her husband's older brother. Outside the home, a woman in purdah wore a veil or an enveloping, concealing outer garment. The trappings of full purdah required both a devotion to traditional practice and the means to dispense with the labor of women in the fields. For most rural families the importance of women's labor made full seclusion impossible, although the idea remained. In some areas, for example, women went unveiled within the confines of the para or village but donned the veil or the outer garment for trips farther from the community. In any case, contact with men outside the immediate family was avoided.

The segregation of the sexes extended into social groups that had rejected full purdah as a result of modern education. Although urban women could enjoy more physical freedom than was traditional and the opportunity to pursue a professional career, they moved in a different social world from their husbands and often worked at their professions in a specifically feminine milieu.

== Women's role in society ==
Available data health, nutrition, education, and economic performance indicated that in the 1980s the status of women in Bangladesh remained considerably inferior to that of men. Women, in custom and practice, remained subordinate to men in almost all aspects of their lives; greater autonomy was the privilege of the rich or the necessity of the very poor. Most women's lives remained centered on their traditional roles, and they had limited access to markets, productive services, education, health care, and local government. This lack of opportunities contributed to high fertility patterns, which diminished family well-being, contributed to the malnourishment and generally poor health of children, and frustrated educational and other national development goals. In fact, acute poverty at the margin appeared to be hitting hardest at women. As long as women's access to health care, education, and training remained limited, prospects for improved productivity among the female population remained poor.

== Social classes and stratification ==
Society in Bangladesh in the 1980s, with the exception of the Hindu caste system, was not rigidly stratified; rather, it was open, fluid, and diffused, without a cohesive social organization and social structure. Social class distinctions were mostly functional, however, and there was considerable mobility among classes. Even the structure of the Hindu caste system in Bangladesh was relatively loose because most Hindus belonged to the lower castes.

Ostensibly, egalitarian principles of Islam were the basis of social organization. Unlike in other regions of South Asia, the Hindu caste-based social system had a very limited effect on Bangladeshi Muslim social culture. Even the low-caste jolhas (weavers) had improved their social standing since 1971. Although several hierarchically arranged families such as the syeds, or sayeds (noble born) and the sheikhs, or shaykhs (also noble born), were noticeable in Bangladesh Muslim society, there were no impenetrable hereditary social distinctions. Rather, fairly permeable classes based on wealth and political influence existed both in the cities and in the villages.

Traditional Muslim class distinctions had little importance in Bangladesh. The proscription against marriage between individuals of high-born and low-born families, once an indicator of the social gap between the two groups, had long ago disappeared; most matrimonial alliances were based on wealth and power and not on the ties of family distinction. Also, many upper-class families in the major urban cities of Bengal such as Dhaka (Jahangirnagar), Barisal (Shayestabad), Murshidabad, Bogra and more, because of their traditional use of the Urdu language, had become alienated in independent Bangladesh.

Although Hindu society used to be formally stratified into caste categories, caste did not figure prominently in the Bangladeshi Hindu community. About 75 percent of the Hindus in Bangladesh belonged to the lower castes, notably namasudras (lesser cultivators), and the remainder belonged primarily to outcaste or untouchable groups. Some members of higher castes belonged to the middle or professional class, but there was no Hindu upper class. With the increasing participation of the Hindus in nontraditional professional mobility, the castes were able to interact in wider political and socioeconomic arenas, which caused some

== Works cited ==
- Heitzman, James; Worden, Robert, eds. (1989). Bangladesh: A Country Study. Washington, D.C.: Federal Research Division, Library of Congress.
