= 2020 sculpture controversy in Bangladesh =

Political controversy in Bangladesh

2020 sculpture controversy in Bangladesh refers to the controversy around the creation of the sculpture of Sheikh Mujibur Rahman, considered the founding father of Bangladesh and the central ideological figure of the Awami League. Opposition was primarily led by the Islamist organisation Hefazat-e-Islam Bangladesh. The controversy unleashed a spiral of protests, counter-protests, and debates between the government and Islamist groups.

== History ==
The controversy began in November 2020 at Dholaikhal, Dhaka, under Awami League government. Hefazat-e-Islam views making any sculpture or representative living thing in Islam as making idols, which is haram according to Islamic jurisprudence. On the other hand, representatives of the then-ruling party, Awami League, made the distinction that sculptures and idols used in worship are not the same. They accused Hefazat-e-Islam of deliberately misinterpreting Islamic jurisprudence under the instigation of opposition forces, intending to create political difficulties for the incumbent Awami League government.

The government has filed sedition cases against the well-known leaders of the no-sculpture movement: Mamunul Haque, Syed Faizul Karim, and Junaid Babunagari, in the face of unrest.

On 4 December, Muslim devotees in front of the Baitul Mukarram National Mosque in Dhaka's Paltan area raised slogans against sculptures and atheism, subsequently pelting stones and bricks at law enforcement personnel. The incident left several individuals injured, including a photojournalist. On 5 December, an under-construction sculpture of the Father of the Nation, Bangabandhu Sheikh Mujibur Rahman, was vandalized at the Five Roads intersection in Kushtia town.

On 9 December, the High Court directed the concerned government authorities to take appropriate legal and punitive actions against those involved in damaging the sculptures of Sheikh Mujibur Rahman.
