= Abdul Malek Halim =

Bangladeshi Islamic scholar

Allama Abdul Malek Halim
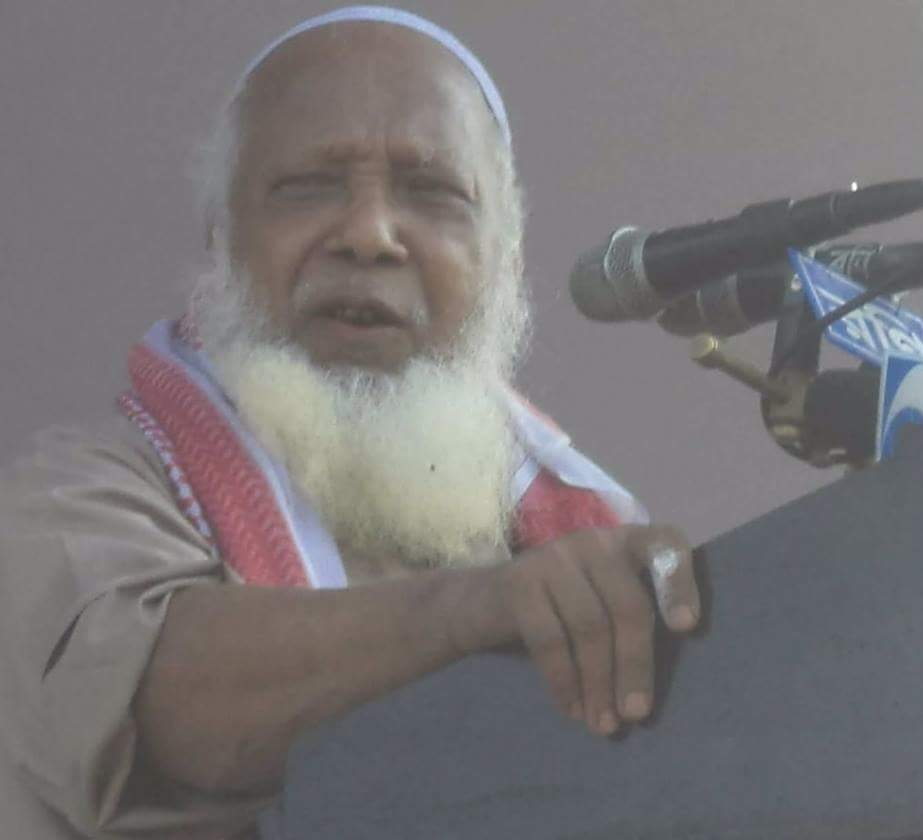
- Halim was giving his speech in an Islamic Conference

Personal life
- Born: Pukuria, Banshkhali Upazila
- Spouse: Alema Hafsa Halim
- Main interest(s): Shari'a, Islamic Education for Women, Modern Education
- Notable idea(s): Qawmi Mohila Madrasa, Al-Jamiatul Arabia Haildhar Madrasa
- Education: Al-jamia Al Islamia Potiya Madrasah, Chittagong

Religious life
- Religion: Islam
- Denomination: Sunni
- Jurisprudence: Hanafi
- Movement: Deobandi

Abdul Malek Halim (Bengali: আল্লামা আব্দুল মালেক হালিম) is a Bangladeshi Islamic scholar and Nayeb-e Ameer of Hefazat-e-Islam Bangladesh. Abdul Malek Halim is the pioneer of Qawmi Mohila (Female) Madrasa in Bangladesh and the founder of Al-Jamiatul Arabia Lil Baneena Wal Banaat Haildhar, the first Qawmi Madrasa having female branch. At present, Abdul Malek Halim is serving as the principle of the Madrasa. Abdul Malek Halim is also serving as the senior vice-chairman of Islami Oikya Jote. He is an ex-chairman of Nizam-e-Islam Party.

== Education ==
Abdul Malek Halim pursued higher education from Al-Jamiah Al-Islamiah Patiya.

== Career ==
Malek started his career as a teacher at a local madrasa after completing education. Later he went to Saudi Arabia and worked as an Imam at a Masjid there. He became inspired by observing the religious training provided to the woman in KSA and other Arab countries and decided to establish an Islamic school for woman. His vision was materialized when an Imam of the Kaaba visits his village and inspired him to settle in his country for establishing a female religious school. Finally, Maulana Halim stablished Al-Jamiatul Arabia Lil Baneena Wal Banaat Haildhar in 1972 and serving as the DG of the institution.

== See also ==
- List of Deobandis
