= Hatirpool =

Marketplace in Dhaka, Bangladesh

Coordinates: 23.742716°N 90.388373°E

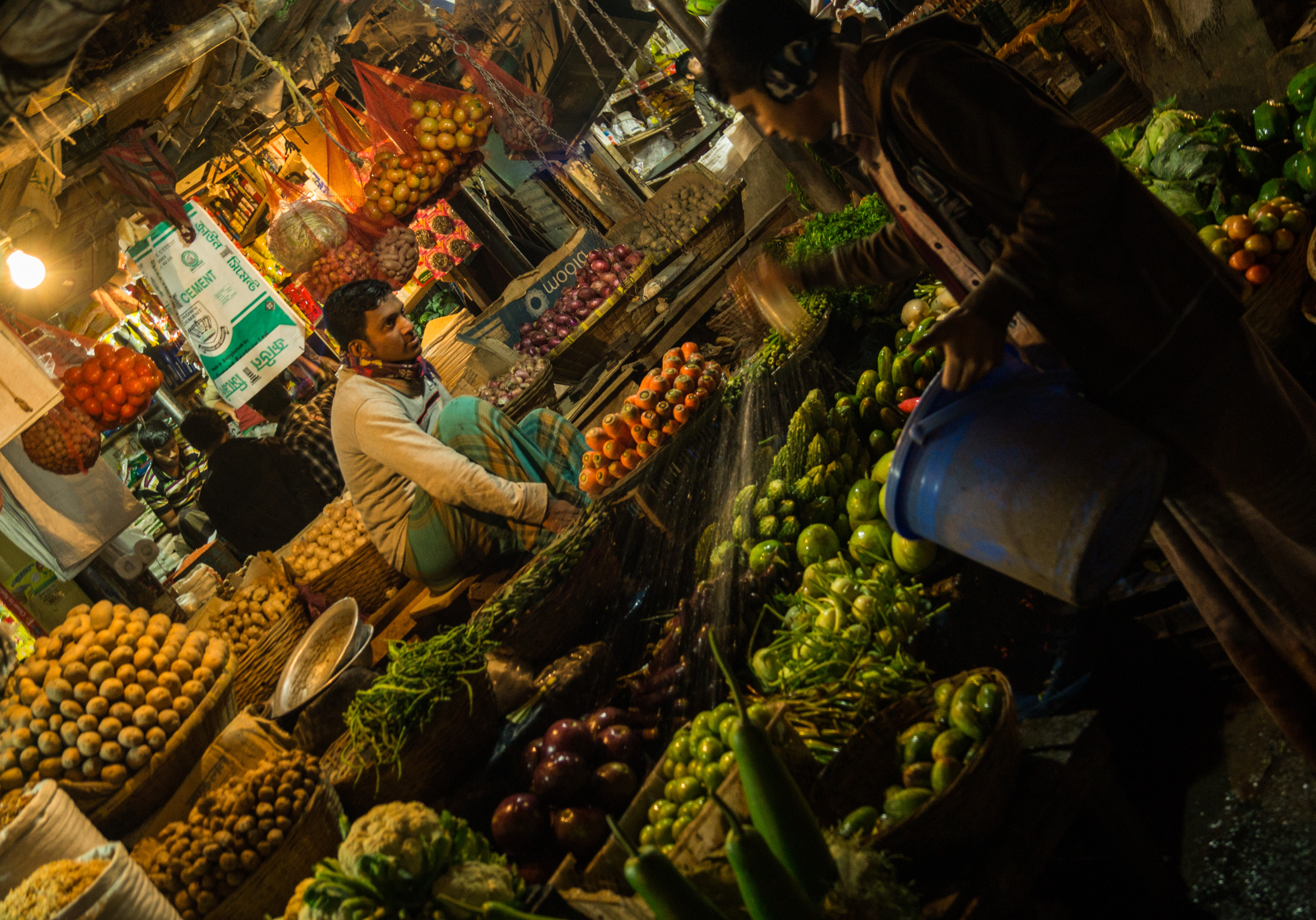
Hatirpool Bazar at Night

Hatirpool is a busy marketplace in Dhaka, Bangladesh. It is a crowded area, with shopping complexes, hotels & restaurants, and market.

== Etymology ==
Legend has it that the Bhawal Raja used to keep his tamed elephants at Pilkhana. The elephants were taken to the Hatirjheel wetlands for bathing along Elephant Road and Hatirpool (elephant's bridge) hence the name of the area.

== Today ==
The long road in Hatirpool connects Katabon to Kawran Bazar.

== List of organization ==
Shopping complexes

- Eastern Plaza
- Nahar Plaza
- Motaleb Plaza

Hotel and restaurants

- Shawarma Kebasish House
- China Kitchen
- Shumi's Hotcake
- 365 Kitchen
- Cafe 5 Elephant
- Pizza House
- Big Bite
- KFC
- Golden Chimney
- Manin Chinese
- Well Food
- Boss Sweets
- Fulkoli
- Baklava
- Decent Pastry Shop
- CP Five Star
- Haji Biriyani
- Seven Hill Restaurant
