= Al-Jamiatul Arabia Haildhar Madrasa =

Islamic university and college in Chittagong, Bangladesh

Al-Jamiatul Arabia Lil Baneena Wal Banaat Haildhar
- আল জামিয়াতুল আরাবিয়া হাইলধর মাদ্রাসা
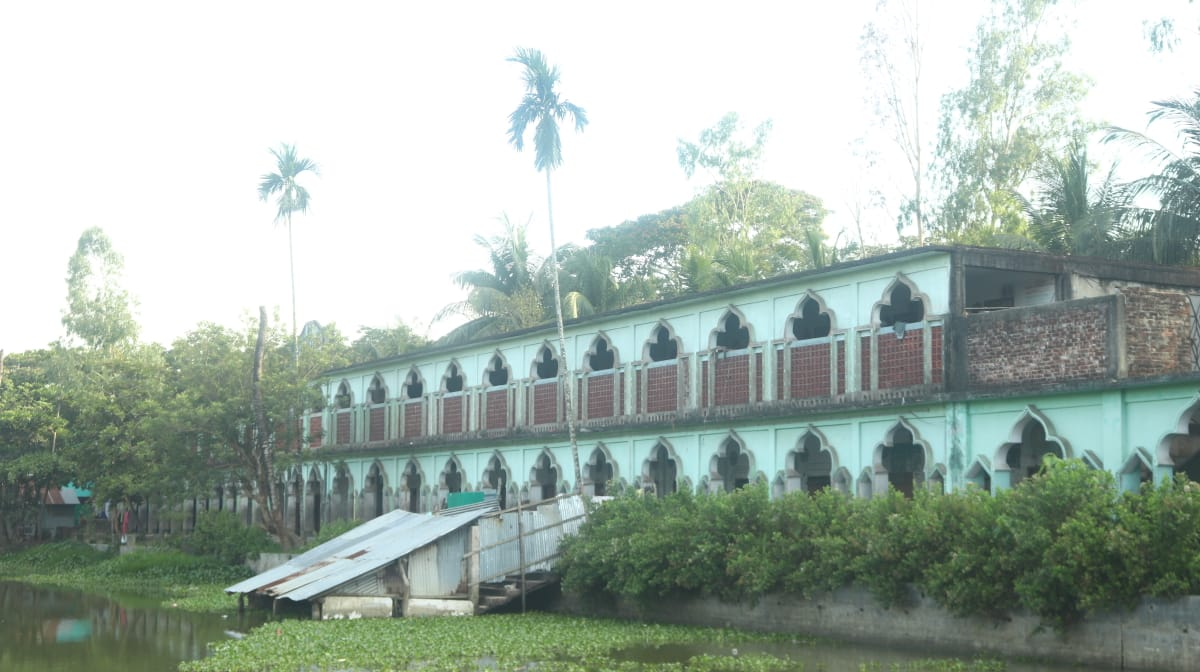
- Haildhar Madrasah Women Branch

Location
- Haildhar, Anwara Upazila
- Coordinates: 22°11.8′N 91°56.1′E

Information
- Type: Islamic university, Qawmi Madrasa
- Established: 1972; 54 years ago (1393 Hijri)
- Principal: Allama Abdul Malek Halim
- Staff: 60+
- Enrollment: 1000+
- Campus: Rural

Al-Jamiatul Arabia Lil Baneena Wal Banaat Haildhar (Bengali: আল জামিয়াতুল আরাবিয়া হাইলধর মাদ্রাসা; Arabic: الجامعة العربية للبنين والبنات هائلدهر), popularly known as the Haildhar Madrasa (Bengali: হাইলধর মাদ্রাসা) is the first Qawmi madrasa having Female Branch in Bangladesh. The madrasah is founded by Allama Abdul Malek Halim.

== Education system ==
The Jamia offers education from the primary level up to highest level of Islamic education.

== Publication ==
'Al-Jamiatul Arabia Lil Baneena Wal Banaat Haildhar' publishes a magazine called Deeni Biplon (Revolution). The magazine contains the lecture of Islamic scholar, poem written by the madrasah student, news regarding present Muslim World and news of the madrasah.

== See also ==
- Al-Jamiah Al-Islamiah Patiya
- Jamiatul Uloom Al-Islamia Lalkhan Bazar
- Al-Jamiatul Islamiah Azizul Uloom Babunagar
