= Hefazat-e-Islam Bangladesh =

Bangladeshi Islamist pressure group

- হেফাজতে ইসলাম বাংলাদেশ
- The logo of Hefazat-e-Islam Bangladesh
- Abbreviation: HIB; Hefazat
- Formation: January 2010; 16 years ago
- Founders: Shah Ahmad Shafi; Junaid Babunagari; Izharul Islam Chowdhury; Abdul Malek Halim
- Type: Far-right
- Purpose: Islamist advocacy group
- Headquarters: Al-Jamiatul Islamiah Azizul Uloom Babunagar, Hathazari Chittagong, Bangladesh
- Region served: Bangladesh
- Official language: Bengali
- Amir: Muhibbullah Babunagari
- Secretary General: Sajidur Rahman
- Joint Secretary-General: Mamunul Haque

Hefazat-e-Islam Bangladesh (Bengali: হেফাজতে ইসলাম বাংলাদেশ, lit. 'Protection of Islam, Bangladesh') is a far-right Deobandi Islamist pressure group based out of the network of Qawmi madrasas consisting mostly of religious teachers (Ulama) and students in Bangladesh. The group oppose secular governance and progressive gender reforms, relying on mass street mobilization rather than direct electoral politics to shift national policy. In 2013, they submitted a 13-point charter to the government of Bangladesh, which included the demand for the enactment of a blasphemy law, the segregation of genders, and the declaration of Ahmadiyyas as non-Muslims.

== History ==
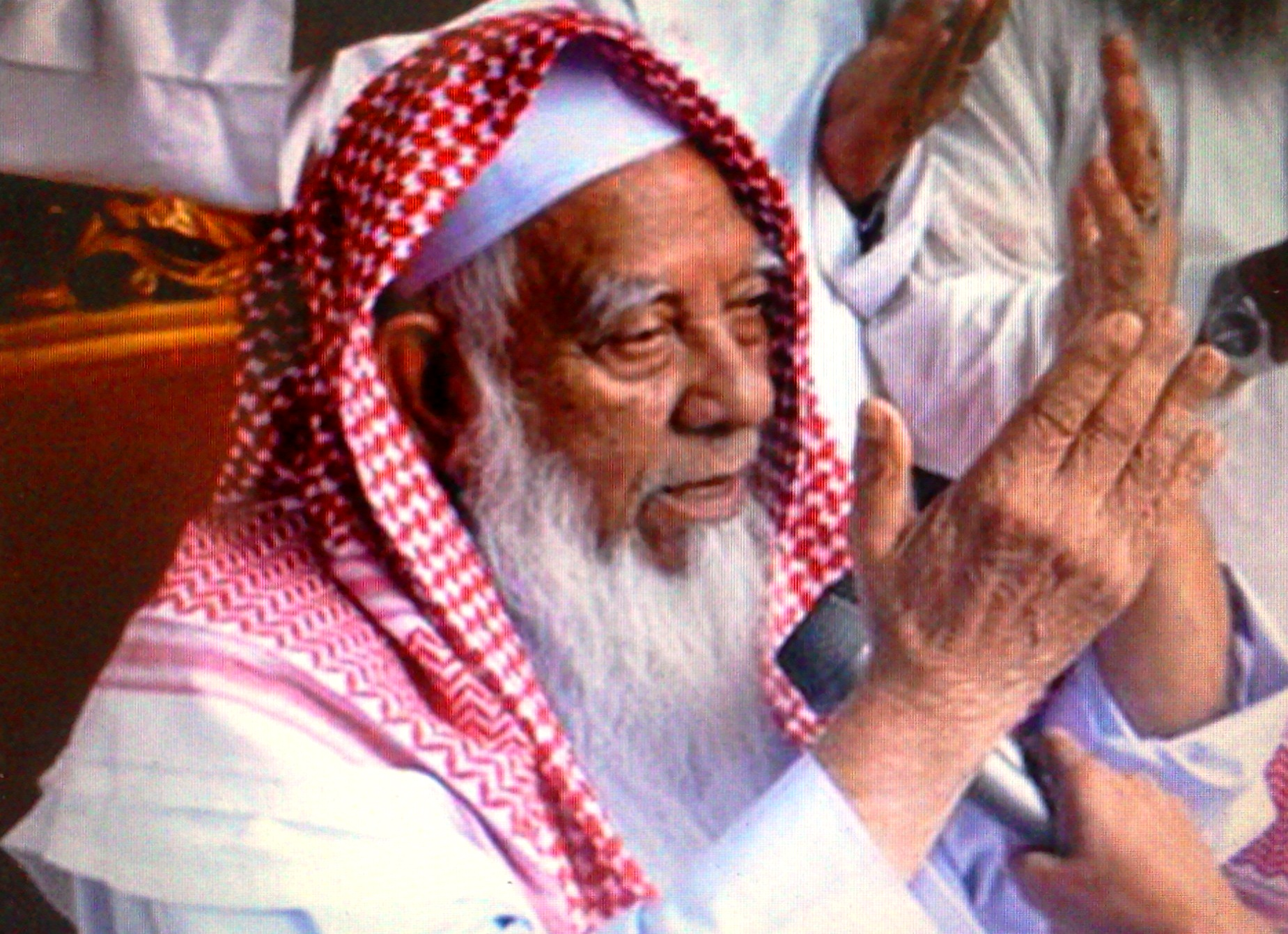
Shah Ahmad Shafi

Hefazat-e-Islam was formed in 2010, as a pressure group comprising the teachers of several madrasas at Chittagong, Bangladesh. Shah Ahmad Shafi, the former director of Hathazari Madrasa, Allama Junaid Babunagari, and Mufti Izharul Islam, the chairman of the Islamist party Islami Oikya Jote, Abdul Malek Halim, founder and principal of the first women's Qawmi madrasah (Haildhar Madrasah) in Bangladesh are regarded as the founders of Hefazat-e-Islam. The formation was allegedly triggered by the 2009 "Women Development Policy" draft. On 24 February 2010, Hefazat wanted to hold a rally at Laldighi Maidan, Chittagong to protest the government's move to slap a ban on religion-based politics, cancellation of the fifth amendment to the Constitution of Bangladesh, and a proposed education policy that would have ended madrasah education. The police refused their request to hold a rally and injured 19 protesters. A few of these madrasa students were arrested by police and later released. In 2011, Hefazat-e-Islam protested some aspects of the proposed Women Development Policy. According to The Economist, Hefazat was financed by doctrinaire Islamists in Saudi Arabia.

=== 13-point demand agitation ===
In 2013, Hefazat-e-Islam was reformed after the allegation that some of the protesters in the Shahbag protests were involved in publishing of content offensive to Muslims on blogs, including the depiction of the Islamic prophet Muhammad as a pornographic character. They arranged a rally towards capital city Dhaka, demanding enaction of capital punishment of the "atheist bloggers" involved in the Shahbag movement and a blasphemy law. They included their demands in 13 points which included:

- Restoration of the phrase: "Complete faith and trust in the Almighty Allah" in the constitution.
- Passing a law in the parliament keeping a provision of the capital punishment of death sentence to prevent defaming Islam.
- Taking measures for stringent punishment of self-declared atheists and bloggers, who led the Shahbagh movement, and anti-Islamists who made derogatory remarks against Muhammad, Also taking steps to stop the spread of "propaganda".
- Stopping infiltration of all "alien-culture", including "shamelessness" in the name of individual's freedom of expression, anti-social activities, adultery, free mixing of males and females and candle lighting. Women must be encouraged to wear hijab and their overall security must be ensured. Stopping harassment of women, open fornication and adultery, sexual harassment, all forms of violence against women and an end to the tradition of dowry.
- Making Islamic education mandatory from primary to higher secondary levels cancelling the women policy and anti-religion education policy.
- Official declaration of Ahmadiyyas as non-Muslim.
- Stopping erection of sculptures at intersections, schools, colleges and universities across the country.
- Lifting restrictions on prayers for ulama in all mosques across the country, including Baitul Mukarram National Mosque.
- Stopping Anti-Islamic content in media.
- Halting anti-Islam activities by NGOs across the country, including in the Chittagong Hill Tracts; (Hefazat fears a "foreign conspiracy" to separate Chittagong Hill Tracts from Bangladesh and make it a Christian state)
- Stopping attacks and extrajudicial killings of ulama.
- Stopping harassment of teachers and students of qawmi madrassas and ulama.
- Freedom for all arrested ulama and madrassa students and withdrawal of all cases filed against them, compensation for the victims, and bringing the assailants to justice.

==== Long march in April 2013 ====
On 6 April 2013, Hefazat-e-Islam organised a long march towards the Motijheel area in Dhaka from Chittagong, Sylhet and Rajshahi to push for their 13-point demand. This was dubbed by some in the media as the "Siege of Dhaka". Awami League leader Nowsher Khan died of head injuries during a clash between his party activists and those of Hefazat-e Islam at Bhanga in Faridpur district. Hefazat supporters also attacked at a rally of Ekatturer Ghatak Dalal Nirmul Committee in Dhaka from their procession, injuring several people including a policeman. Hefazat supporters also attacked and injured Afsar Ahmed, the pro-vice chancellor of Jahangirnagar University, and reportedly threatened journalists.

==== 5–6 May protests ====
On 5 May 2013, Hefazat arranged a rally in Dhaka, in the demand of their 13 points. On 4 May 2013, Hefazat activists gathered at all six entrance routes to Dhaka; creating a blockade, from dawn on 5 May 2013. At noon, with the permission of Dhaka Metropolitan Police (DMP), activists entered Dhaka and started moving towards Baitul Mukarram National Mosque in order to attend a prayer service. However activists of Hefazat-e-Islam were attacked by the ruling Awami League activists at various places using lethal arms such as pistols and guns who were using the Gulistan Road to reach Shapla Square. In return, Hefazat activists threw bricks at them. During the clashes, two television journalists were injured, apparently by Hefazat protesters. At about 3:00 pm while Hefazat leaders were delivering speeches, the Secretary General of Awami League, Sayed Ashraful Islam, at a press conference, threatened them to leave Dhaka. On the other hand, the opposition party, Bangladesh Nationalist Party (BNP) asserted that Hefazat members had a democratic right to assemble and articulate their cause. Hefazat supporters reportedly set fire to book stores located beside the south gate of the Baitul Mukarram during their program, inadvertently burning copies of Qurans, and assaulting two reporters. However, reports of this event are disputed, and Hefazat denies burning any books. According to BNP leader MK Anwar, the Qurans were burned by Debashish, a leader of the ruling party Awami League's volunteer wing, the Swechchhasebak League. Hefazat also denies the violent incidents of vandalism and arson attributed to it.

In the early hours of 6 May security forces, drawn from police, the elite Rapid Action Battalion and paramilitary Border Guard Bangladesh jointly launched an operation named "Operation Secure Shapla" to prevent Hefazat's violence by driving them out from Dhaka. At the beginning of operation, police cut the power supply in the city's commercial area, but the total operation was live telecasted over few TV channel. During the course of the operations, two television channels, Diganta Television and Islamic TV, were shut down.

===== Casualties =====
According to government estimates, the number of casualties in this operation was 11, including a few law enforcement members, while the Daily Star gave as little as 5 deaths. This figure was dismissed by Human Rights Watch and other news agencies. Hefazat and the BNP initially claimed that 2,000-3,000 had been killed in the operations. British journalist confirmed that at least 36 people had died. which is also rejected by government. According to The Economist, European diplomats, as many as 50 people were killed in Dhaka, which didn't provide any diplomat's name. Because of the differing views, Human Rights Watch called for an independent body to investigate the protest deaths. the poet and activist Farhad Mazhar said the government and media were making a cover-up and disinformation campaign. Human Rights Watch disputed opposition claims of 200 deaths, but agreed that a massacre had occurred. Amnesty International demanded that Bangladesh government set up an independent and impartial investigation immediately to look into police excesses. UN Secretary-General Ban Ki-moon voiced concern over the killing of unarmed protesters in Bangladesh and requested the government to sit with religious and political leaders.

On 6 May, the protests spread across the country. In Narayanganj, students and teachers of a local madrasa held protests and blockaded the Dhaka-Chittagong highway. In return, police fired several hundred gunshots, killing 27 people. In Hathazari Upazila, Chittagong, six people were shot dead by police. In Bagerhat, one Hefazat member died in a clash between protesters and police.

=== Lawsuits ===
The government filed 12 cases against top leaders of the Hefazat-e Islam for murder, vandalism, arson and destruction of properties and other charges, after a demand for impartial investigations from supporting organisations. In 2014, a case was filed with the International Criminal Court against 25 Bangladeshi ministers and security officials, including Prime Minister Sheikh Hasina for alleged torture, forced disappearance, extrajudicial executions and mass killings.

=== Secularism lawsuit ===
In 2016, secular activists led by Anisuzzaman submitted a petition to remove Islam as the state religion. They argued that since secularism was one of the four fundamental principles of the first 1972 constitution, it should be reinstated. Secularism was removed from the constitution in 1975, and Islam was made the state religion in 1988, during the term of Hussain Muhammad Ershad as president. In 1988, few secular minded citizens of Bangladesh had filed a petition to restore the secularism in the constitution. On 27 March 2016, a Bangladeshi court accepted a petition to remove Islam as the state religion. Hefazat-e-Islam reportedly had threatened armed resistance if Islam was dropped as the state religion. The court rejected the petition, stating that those who brought it forward did not have the right to do so. A lawyer and Hefazat spokesperson argued that having Islam as the state religion would not affect minority religions. They also noted that the petition was unnecessary as Bangladeshi Muslims were respectful of minority religions and "set a tremendous example of communal harmony even after having Islam as state religion."

=== Lady Justice statue ===
In 2017, supporters of Hefazat-e Islam protested against the display of a figure of the Greek goddess of justice at Bangladesh Supreme Court, calling it a measure and conspiracy to undermine Islam in Bangladesh. Hefazat-e-Islam later petitioned the Supreme Court to remove the statue, which was supported by the Awami League-backed Bangladesh Awami Olama League and a news editor.

=== 2021 anti-Modi protests ===
On the news of arrival of Narendra Modi during Bangladesh golden jubilee of the independence celebrations on 26 March. Accusing Modi of being anti-Muslim, Hefazat-e-Islam started protesting against invitation of Modi.

==== 26-28 March protests ====
After the arrival of Narendra Modi in Bangladesh, Hefazat-e-Islam supporters gathered at Baitul Mukarram National Mosque, Dhaka on 26 March after the Friday prayer. During the protests, a deadly conflict started when supporters of Awami League tried to stop the protesters from waving their shoes as a sign of disrespect to Modi. This resulted in violent clashes from both sides. Protesters were dispersed by police using tear gas and rubber bullets injuring scores of people. After the incident, the violence then spread to several key districts in the country. The attack in Baitul Mukarram infuriated students at Hathazari of Chittagong, a stronghold of pro-Hefazat students. Students came out in the street to protest the attack on their fellows. The demonstration was obstructed by police while passing the Hathazari Police Station. Protesters started attacking police stations, and public properties, prompting police to open fire. Four protesters died in the process. To stop the spread of news and cut off communication across the country, the government of Bangladesh blocked Facebook on March 26, from the afternoon.

Hundreds of Hefazat demonstrators returned to the streets of Dhaka on Saturday. Clashes were reported from many parts of the country. Brahmanbaria was widely affected by the violence. Hefazat supporters attacked train and government offices. Five more people were killed on Saturday. Meanwhile, Facebook and its instant messaging app, Facebook Messenger, were kept blocked across the country on Saturday.

== Ideology ==
Rifat Binte Lutful urged that although it started as a fundamentlist group, later it began to drift towards moderate Islamism with Awami League administration recognising qawmi madrasah degrees and forming an anti-radical unity. The group has called on the government to cancel the commission instated by the 2024 interim government to protect and promote women's rights and freedom.

== Controversy ==
=== Stance on culture and public entertainment ===
In May 2026, local student wings and Islamist groups affiliated with Hefazat-e-Islam in Brahmanbaria pressured local authorities to cancel the public screening of the film Bonolota Express. The Brahmanbaria Film Society had scheduled a special screening of Bonolota Express for 30 May 2026 at the Annada Government High School to celebrate Eid-ul-Adha. The event faced immediate opposition from the Brahmanbaria District Qawmi Chhatra Oikya Parishad, a student organization aligned with the local Qawmi madrassah network. The campaign was coordinated from the Jamia Islamia Yunusia Madrasa, a historic stronghold for Hefazat-e-Islam in the district. Following an emergency meeting at the madrassah directed by senior Islamic scholars, activists launched an online campaign labeling the film un-Islamic and obscene. Hafez Nasrullah Muaz, a leader of the student wing, circulated the film's poster marked with a red cross, demanding the administration halt the event to preserve the religious and social environment of the city. Cancellation and Aftermath Citing the potential for law and order disruption and the anger expressed by these religious groups, the local administration and school authorities revoked the venue's permission hours before the screening. A subsequent attempt by local youths to screen the film in the nearby Taltala village of Kasba was also halted by police intervention following security concerns raised by the same groups. The cancellation drew condemnation from 10 local cultural organizations and Member of Parliament Rumeen Farhana, who criticized the capitulation to "fundamentalist" pressure.

On 10 April 2025, Hefazat leadership, including Amir Muhibbullah Babunagari and Secretary General Sajidur Rahman, issued a statement labeling the Mangal Shobhajatra as a Hindu ritual. The organization argued that the procession mirrors the annual Krishna Janmashtami rally termed its integration into national New Year events a form of "cultural imposition" and "secular cultural fascism" aimed at undermining Muslim identity. They singled out the Faculty of Fine Arts of Dhaka University as the source of this cultural shift, alleging it was used to establish secular dominance. Hefazat claimed that the procession was originally introduced in 1989 as the Ananda Shobhajatra, asserting that the name was later changed to Mongol Shobhajatra due to an external "Indian conspiracy." The group also criticized the 2016 UNESCO recognition of the event as an "Intangible Cultural Heritage", calling it a state-sponsored distortion. To resolve the controversy, Hefazat urged the Ministry of Cultural Affairs to petition UNESCO for a review and demanded that the term "Ananda Shobhajatra" be reinstated as a neutral, non-religious alternative to ensure national symbols do not conflict with Islamic monotheism.

In February 2025, a cultural festival organized to commemorate the 134th death anniversary of Lalon Shah in the Madhupur Upazila of Tangail was canceled following direct opposition from Hefazat and the Qaumi Ulama Parishad. The event, arranged by the Madhupur Lalon Sangha, was called off despite organizers offering to omit discussions on Lalon's philosophy and altering the musical selection to accommodate the group's concerns. Local Hefazat leadership defended the intervention by publicly stating that they would not permit the propagation of Lalon's ideology under any circumstances, asserting that it contradicted Islamic principles. Cultural activist groups heavily criticized the administrative capitulation, citing it as part of a broader trend of unchecked pressure by religious groups against traditional secular fixtures and musical gatherings across the region.

In November 2024, Hefazat-e-Islam led a targeted campaign that resulted in the cancellation of a traditional cultural gathering centered around the philosophy and music of the mystic Sufi saint Lalon Shah. The "Mahati Sadhusanga and Lalon Mela," a major cultural event organized by the Muktidham Ashram and Lalon Academy in Madhya Narsingpur, Narayanganj, was abruptly canceled by local authorities following intense opposition. Hardline Hefazat-e-Islam members and local Islamist groups demanded the ban on the grounds that musical performances and Baul traditions violate Islamic principles. Facing threats of violent disruption and mobilization from the group, the district administration refused permission, ordering the festival to be called off just before its scheduled launch on 22 November. The cancellation over these threats drew widespread condemnation from 71 organizations including Bangladesh Udichi Shilpigoshthi, Bangladesh Communist Party, NAP Narayanganj Committee, BSD Narayanganj Committee, Workers Party criticized the local administration's failure to protect cultural freedom and its capitulation to religious hardliners.

On 28 March 2021, during nationwide anti-Modi protests, Hefazat activists targeted and severely damaged the Ustad Alauddin Khan Sangeetangan, a historic cultural academy in Brahmanbaria. The institution had been established in 1956 to preserve the legacy of the legendary classical music maestro Ustad Alauddin Khan. The attackers vandalized the academy's museum, music classroom, and dance room, destroying artifacts, including traditional musical instruments, rare 1000 historical photographs, and original manuscripts used by the Alauddin Khan.

=== Communal Violence ===
==== 2021 Sunamganj Violence ====
On 17 March 2021, thousands of followers and supporters of Hefazat-e-Islam launched a coordinated attack targeting the Hindu minority community in the Shalla Upazila of Sunamganj district. The violence was triggered by a Facebook post by a young local Hindu man, Jhumon Das, who had criticized a speech delivered by Hefazat's joint secretary general, Mamunul Haque, during a conference held in nearby Derai Upazila a few days prior. Although local police had already detained Das the previous evening in an effort to defuse regional tensions, Hefazat organizers used megaphones from local mosques to mobilize a massive crowd. The mobilized mob, armed with makeshift weapons, attacked the village of Noagaon. The attackers went on a rampage for hours, vandalizing and looting approximately 89 Hindu homes and damaging 8 local family temples. Subsequent investigations conducted by media houses and the Police Bureau of Investigation (PBI) identified local political figures and hardline Hefazat loyalists as the primary masterminds behind the instigation and execution of the assault. The incident drew widespread domestic condemnation including Bangladesh Nationalist Paty (BNP). Protests and human chains were organized by the Bangladesh Puja Celebration Council and the Hindu Buddhist Christian Unity Council.

==== 2016 Nasirnagar Violence ====
On 30 October 2016, local leaders of Hefazat, alongside the radical Islamist group Ahle Sunnat Wal Jamaat, organized and led a massive protest rally in Nasirnagar Upazila of Brahmanbaria that culminated in widespread violence against the minority Hindu community. The demonstrations were triggered by a controversial, allegedly defamatory Facebook post depicting an image of the Kaaba superimposed with an image of Shiva, which had been attributed to a Hindu fisherman named Rasraj Das. Despite Das apologizing and clarifying that his account had been hacked, Islamist groups used megaphones from local mosques to mobilize a crowd. The rally quickly escalated into a coordinated attack as a mob of approximately 3,000 individuals targeted Hindu residential areas and religious sites. The violence resulted in the injury of over 100 people and the systematic looting and vandalism of at least 19 temples and more than 300 homes. Subsequent investigations by Dhaka Tribune revealed that local Hefazat leaders were deeply involved in the orchestration of the rallies that incited the mob.

On 12 February 2019, activists from Hefazat and other Islamist organizations, launched a coordinated attack on an Ahmadiyya village in the Ahmadnagar area of Panchagarh Sadar upazila. The violence broke out ahead of a planned three-day annual convention (Jalsa Salana) of the Ahmadiyya community, which hardline Islamist groups had been demanding that the local administration cancel. The attackers targeted residential homes, vandalizing and torching at least 20 houses belonging to Ahmadiyya families, while looting properties and setting fire to a local Ahmadiyya clinic. The coordinated assault resulted in at least 50 Ahmadiyya community members being injured. The clashes, which involved the throwing of brickbats and the deployment of law enforcement forces using rubber bullets and tear gas, also left several police officials injured. Following the extensive outbreak of violence, the local administration ordered the immediate suspension of the convention to restore regional order.

On 6 April 2013, returning Hefazat activists assaulted supporters of the Ganajagaran Mancha near Ramna Park in Dhaka as the activists were traveling toward Shahbagh. The clash broke out when Hefazat supporters targeted the vehicle carrying the secular activists. During the confrontation, the Hefazat activists physically assaulted several media personnel, including a female television journalist Nadia Sharmeen and freelance photographers, while verbally abusing women present at the scene. In another incidence, violence erupted at Amtoli near the Mohakhali flyover when a procession of Hefazatsupporters on their way to Motijheel launched an attack on a temporary Ganajagaran Mancha procession at around 10:30 AM. According to Hefazat supporters, the confrontation was triggered after they allegedly heard Shahriar Kabir, the acting president of the Ekattorer Ghatak Dalal Nirmul Committee, using what they described as "provocative and abusive" language regarding their long-march program.

=== Allegations of links with Jamaat-e-Islami ===
The Awami League government alleged that Hefazat is front for Bangladesh Jamaat-e-Islami and seeks to derail the International Crimes Tribunal for the war crimes committed in 1971. Hefazat denies any role with Jamaat-e-Islami, and alleged that this is a libel to subjugate Islamists in public life. Analysts also say that any relationship claim is baffling as Ahmad Shafi belongs to a band of Islamists that, unlike Jamaat, did not oppose the independence of Bangladesh, and supported a united India and rejected the creation of Pakistan in 1947.

=== Relationship with Pro-Taliban leaders ===
Maulana Habibur Rahman, a madrasa principal of Sylhet and one of the organisers of Hefazat-e Islam's 5 May protest, claimed that he met Osama bin Laden and members of the banned militant organisation Harkat-ul-Jihad al-Islami, in 1998. However, Hefazat leaders have condemned Harkat-ul-Jihad al-Islami and Al-Qaeda and its leader Ayman al-Zawahiri. In 2014, Hefazat spokesman Azizul Haque Islamabadi said:

There is prevailing a congenial and peaceful environment in Bangladesh. People are living in peace and in such a situation the announcement by Al-Qaeda chief Zawahiri has made the people fearful and worried. Bangladesh had experienced earlier militant activities and terrorism by Jamaat-ul-Mujahideen and Harkat-ul-Jihad. But they could not emerge successful and Al-Qaeda would not come out successful in Bangladesh despite their announcement.

The German ambassador to Bangladesh Albrecht Conze opined that Hefazat demands fundamentalism in Bangladesh. However, in 2014, diplomats from the American embassy in Bangladesh met with the leaders of Hefazat and discussed their demands.

=== Explosion at affiliated madrasa ===
On 7 October 2013, an explosion occurred at a madrasah run by Hefazat-e-Islam's leader Mufti Izharul Islam Chowdhury driven Al Jamiatul Ulum Al Islamia Madrasa at Lal Khan Bazar, Chittagong. Police reportedly seized explosives after the raid. The madrasa authorities had claimed that computers' UPS of the school and laptops had exploded.

== See also ==
- List of Deobandi organisations
- 2020 sculpture controversy in Bangladesh
- Post–Hasina Hefazat
