= Diganta Television =

Defunct Bangladeshi television channel

- Country: Bangladesh
- Broadcast area: Nationwide
- Headquarters: Syed Nazrul Islam Sharoni, Purana Paltan, Dhaka

Programming
- Language: Bengali

Ownership
- Owner: Diganta Media Corporation

History
- Launched: 28 August 2008; 18 years ago
- Closed: 6 May 2013; 13 years ago

Diganta Television (Bengali: দিগন্ত টেলিভিশন; lit. 'horizon television') was a Bangladeshi Bengali-language privately owned satellite and cable television channel owned by Diganta Media Corporation Ltd, which also owns the daily newspaper Daily Naya Diganta, founded by Mir Quasem Ali. The channel officially began broadcasting on 28 August 2008, and was shut down along with Islamic TV on 6 May 2013. Diganta Television was headquartered in the Purana Paltan area of Dhaka.

== History ==
=== Launch and following years ===
Diganta Television gained its license under the BNP-Jamaat led government in the mid-2000s. It was founded in 2007, although it officially went on the air on 28 August 2008 as the ninth privately owned television channel launched in Bangladesh. The broadcasts of the channel were inaugurated by President Iajuddin Ahmed at a ceremony held in the Bangladesh China Friendship Conference Center. The channel was criticized for its affiliation with the Jamaat-e-Islami political party. Then Minister of Information Dilip Barua was questioned for participating in Diganta's second anniversary celebrations in 2010.

In March 2012, freedom fighter Abdul Kader Siddique began hosting a talk show titled Shobar Upore Desh, and thus was criticized by his brother Latif for "siding with war criminals". During Eid-ul-Fitr season in August 2012, Diganta aired the Iranian film A Separation. As a result of its Jamaat affiliation, Diganta faced boycotts during the 2013 Shahbag protests. At one point, the Ministry of Information sent a letter to Diganta warning it to edit any content critical of the government, threatening it with a closure otherwise.

=== Closure ===
During the 2013 Shapla Square protests, as the channels were reporting on police action following the rally of Hefazat-e-Islam Bangladesh, the Bangladesh Telecommunication Regulatory Commission forced Diganta Television off the air, along with Islamic TV, on 6 May 2013, at about 4:30 am. The chief reporter of the channel, M. Kamruzzaman, said that around 25 plain-clothed policemen and an official from the broadcast commission had entered their studios without warning at dawn.

According to Information Minister Hasanul Haq Inu, it was taken off the air as its reporting on the raid on Hefazat contained "irresponsible exaggerations and misinformation to inflame public opinion, a violation of the conditions of its license." Critics have alleged this an instance of the Sheikh Hasina government of using the Islamist issue to silence dissidents. Although the channels were shut down, their licenses have not been revoked. Former Information and Broadcasting Minister Hasanul Haq Inu stated that no fixed decision was made regarding the licenses of Diganta Television and Islamic TV, calling both of them "riot instigators" while stating the reason behind the ban, which was incitement against the government.

=== Tentative relaunch ===
Following Sheikh Hasina's resignation on 5 August 2024 caused by the anti-government protests in Bangladesh, all the former staff members went to the headquarters of Diganta Television for the first time since its closure the following day. Discussions to resume broadcasts of the channel took place there. Dhaka Reporters Unity demanded immediate reinstatement of all unjustly closed media outlets in Bangladesh, including Diganta Television. The Ministry of Information and Broadcasting later withdrew the closure order of Diganta Television and allowed the channel to return to the air once again. Ziaul Kabir Sumon, the chief news editor, stated that after getting a Bangladesh Satellite-1 frequency after applying to the BTRC, Diganta would officially go on the air after over a decade of absence. In an interview with Star News in May 2026, Diganta Media Corporation's CEO, Shibbir Ahmed, stated that Diganta Television would return to the air within six months.

== Programming ==
Diganta Television mostly aired news programming for sixteen hours per day. Other than that, various types of programming, such as dramas, music, children's programming, religious programming, women's programming, and talk shows, were aired on the channel.

=== List of programming ===
- Alokito Path o Sharal Path
- Aparajita
- Carrier Line
- Chena-Ochena
- Chitra Bichitra
- Dakhin Hawa
- Diganta Onusandhan
- Diganta Shonglap
- Ekanto Songlap
- Ektara Dotara
- Get Safe
- i-Tech
- Iqra
- Islam and Women
- Jiban Onnesha
- Jibon Japon
- Lime Light
- Mele Dhori Ichcheguli
- Nithua Pathar
- Path Ebong Patheo
- Patla Khan Lane
- Patheo Protidin
- Pothe Prantore
- Probashe Bangladesh
- Public Parliament
- Ranna Banna
- School Angina
- Science & Quran
- Science Dot Com
- Score Card
- Shahittya Diganta
- Shastho Diganta
- Shobar Aage Desh
- Shobar Upore Desh
- Shokal Belar Pakhi
- Shorol Poth
- Suborno Shokal

==== News programming ====
- Business News
- Desher Khabor
- Diganta News
- Diganta News Hour
- Diganta Prime Time
- Duronto Khobor
- Morning News
- News at Midday
- News at Noon
- News of the Day

== See also ==
- List of television stations in Bangladesh
