= Islamic TV =

Islamic TV ইসলামিক টিভি
- Country: Bangladesh
- Broadcast area: Nationwide
- Headquarters: Hatirpool, Dhaka

Programming
- Picture format: 1080i HDTV

Ownership
- Owner: Broadcast Islamic World
- Key people: Nasreen Sayeed

History
- Launched: April 2007; 19 years ago (original); 19 February 2026; 6 months ago (soft relaunch)
- Closed: 6 May 2013; 13 years ago (original)

Links
- Website: islamictv.news

Islamic TV (Bengali: ইসলামিক টিভি) is a Bangladeshi Bengali-language satellite and cable religious television channel launched in April 2007. It is headquartered in the Hatirpool neighborhood of Dhaka. One of the founders of the channel was its owner Sayeed Iskander, the younger brother of the former Prime Minister Khaleda Zia.

It is the first and currently the only television channel in Bangladesh dedicated to religious programming. The channel also broadcasts entertainment and news programming. In 2013, the Bangladesh Telecommunication Regulatory Commission shut Islamic TV down, along with Diganta TV. Islamic TV softly resumed broadcasts on 19 February 2026.

== History ==
=== Closure ===
The Bangladesh Telecommunication Regulatory Commission forced Islamic TV to cease transmissions on 6 May 2013, at about 2:30 am. According to managing director of the channel Shams Eskander, law and order forces went to the headquarters of Islamic TV and destroyed broadcasting equipments and vandalised the office. This was followed by the closure of Diganta Television on the same day. According to Information Minister Hasanul Haq Inu, it was taken off the air because its reporting on the raid on Hefazat-e-Islam Bangladesh contained "irresponsible exaggerations and misinformation to inflame public opinion, a violation of the conditions of its license."

Critics have alleged this an instance of the Sheikh Hasina government of using the Islamist issue to silence dissidents. Although the channels were shut down, their licenses have not been revoked. Former Information and Broadcasting Minister Hasanul Haq Inu stated that no fixed decision was made regarding the licenses of Diganta Television and Islamic TV, calling both of them "riot instigators" while stating the reason behind the ban, which was incitement against the government. The chairman and founding director of Islamic TV, Sardar Sahabuddin Mintu, died on 25 October 2015, two years after the channel was shut down.

=== Relaunch ===
On 8 August 2024, Dhaka Reporters Unity demanded immediate reinstatement of all unjustly closed media outlets in Bangladesh, including Islamic TV, following the resignation of prime minister Sheikh Hasina after anti-government protests. Work had been underway to officially relaunch the television channel. It commenced fresh test broadcasts in late January 2026, and later soft launched on 19 February after thirteen years, coinciding the first day of Ramadan in Bangladesh. Head of operations Shahjanul Islam Palash stated that as of May 2026, Islamic TV reached around 40–45% of Bangladesh's areas.

== Programming ==
- Islamer Aloke Chikithsha Biggan

== See also ==
- Peace TV Bangla
- List of television stations in Bangladesh
