= 2013 Shahbag protests =

Protest in Shahbag, Bangladesh in 2013

- Part of Trial for Bangladesh genocide from Bangladesh Liberation War
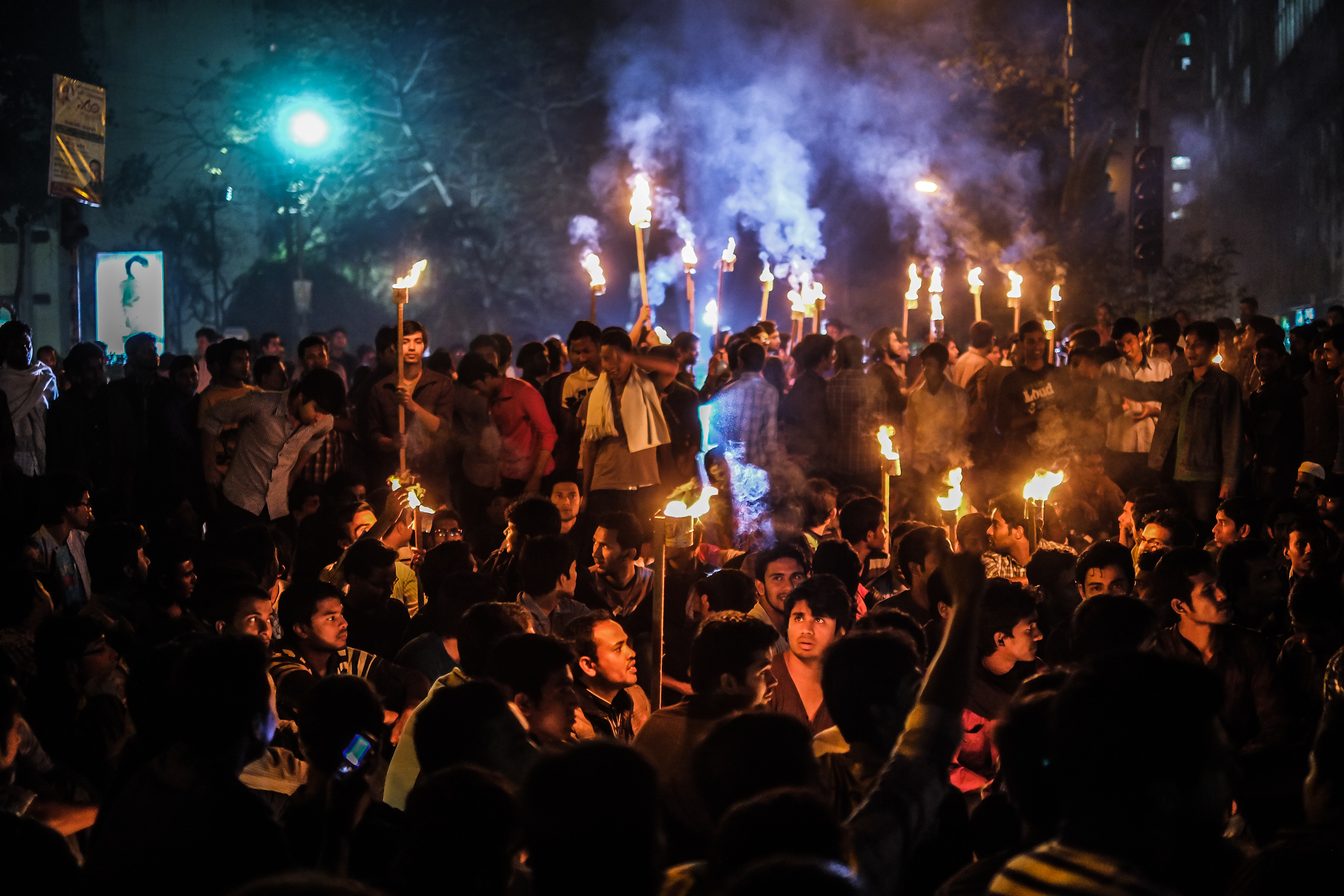
- Demonstrators in Shahbag in 2013
- Date: 5 February 2013 – 6 March 2013
- Location: Bangladesh (began at Shahbag Square, Dhaka); 23°44′18″N 90°23′45″E
- Goals: Capital punishment for those convicted of war crimes during the Bangladesh Liberation War by the ICT; Ban of Bangladesh Jamaat-e-Islami from politics; Boycott of Bangladesh Jamaat-e-Islami institutions
- Methods: Civil resistance; Demonstrations; Online activism
- Result: Government passed a new act to swiftly execute the verdict of war criminals; 5 Jamaat and 1 BNP leader were executed; Emerging of Hefazat-e-Islam Bangladesh; Bangladesh Supreme Court postponed the registration of the Bangladesh Jamaat-e-Islami political party making them unfit to contest the general elections; Bangladesh Jamaat-e-Islami went underground

Parties
Directly: Bangladesh Online Activist Network; Leftist progressive Student Alliance; Bangladesh Students Union; Socialist Students' Front; Revolutionary Students Unity of Bangladesh; Awami League; Chhatra League; Jubo League; Sammilito Sangskritik Jote; Indirectly: Grand Alliance (Bangladesh); Communist Party of Bangladesh	Directly: Bangladesh Jamaat-e-Islami; Bangladesh Islami Chhatra Shibir; Hefazat-e-Islam Bangladesh; Indirectly: Bangladesh Nationalist Party; Jatiya Party (Ershad); 18 Party Alliance

Lead figures
Imran H Sarkar; Lucky Akter; Nasiruddin Yousuff; Muhammed Zafar Iqbal	Motiur Rahman Nizami; Shah Ahmad Shafi; Junaid Babunagari; Mahmudur Rahman

The 2013 Shahbag protests were widespread demonstrations held in Bangladesh. On 5 February 2013, protests ignited in Shahbag, Bangladesh, fuelled by the call for the execution of the convicted war criminal Abdul Quader Mollah. Previously sentenced to life imprisonment, Mollah was convicted on five of six counts of war crimes by the International Crimes Tribunal of Bangladesh. Mollah supported West Pakistan during the 1971 Bangladesh Liberation War and played a crucial role in the murder of numerous Bengali nationalists and intellectuals. The demonstrations also sought the government's ban on Bangladesh Jamaat-e-Islami, from participating in politics, including elections, and a boycott of institutions supporting or affiliated with the group.

Protesters perceived Mollah's initial sentence of life imprisonment as unduly lenient, leading bloggers and online activists to mobilize additional protests at Shahbag, resulting in heightened participation in the demonstrations. Jamaat orchestrated several counter-protests challenging the tribunal's validity and the protest movement, advocating for the release of those accused and convicted.

On 15 February, blogger and activist Ahmed Rajib Haider was killed outside his house, by members of an Islamist conservative terrorist group, Ansarullah Bangla Team, leading to widespread condemnation and outrage during the heightened time. On 27 February of the same year, the war tribunal convicted Delwar Hossain Sayeedi, a prominent fundamental-Islamist, of war crimes against humanity and subsequently sentenced him to death; the sentence was later commuted to life imprisonment.

== Background ==
From March to December 1971, East Pakistan engaged in a nine-month conflict against West Pakistan. The Indian Army, having provided guerrilla training to the Mukti Bahini, entered the war on 3 December 1971, supporting East Pakistan's liberation. The armed conflict culminated on 16 December 1971, with the surrender of the Pakistani Armed Forces to the joint force of Bangladesh and India in East Pakistan. This surrender marked the formation of the People's Republic of Bangladesh as an independent and sovereign nation.

According to the famous Blood telegram from the United States consulate in Dhaka (formerly known as 'Dacca') to the State Department, many atrocities had been committed by the Pakistan Army and its supporter Razakars and Al-Badar militia. Time reported a high-ranking US official as saying, "It is the most incredible, calculated killing since the days of the Nazis in Poland." Estimates are that one to three million people were killed, nearly a quarter of a million women were raped and more than ten million people fled to India to escape persecution.

A paramilitary force known as the Razakars was created by the May 1971 Razakar Ordinance promulgated by Tikka Khan, the governor of East Pakistan. The ordinance stipulated the creation of a volunteer force, trained and equipped by the provincial government.

The majority of East Pakistanis supported the call to create a free and independent Bangladesh during the Liberation War. However, Pakistani supporters and members of Islamic political parties, particularly Jamaat-e-islami and its east Pakistan student wing Islami Chatra Sangha (ICS, Bengali: ইসলামী ছাত্র সঙ্ঘ, romanized: Islami Chhatro Shônggho), the Muslim League, the Pakistan Democratic Party (PDP) Council and Nizam-e-Islami, collaborated with the Pakistani army to resist the formation of an independent Bangladesh. The students belonging to Islami Chatra Sangha were known as the Al-Badr force; people belonging to Jamaat-e-Islami Pakistan, Muslim League, Nizam-e-Islami and similar groups were called Al-Shams, and the Urdu-speaking people (generally known as Bihari) were known as Al-Mujahid.

=== After independence ===
In November 1973 Sheikh Mujibur Rahman issued a general pardon for the war criminals during the liberation war. Under Hussain Muhammad Ershad Jamaat-e-Islami participated in 1986 election. In the 1991 election, which was the first free and fair election after independence, Jamaat got 18 seats out of 300 and gained 12.2% of vote.

In 1992, the distinguished Bangladeshi writer and political activist, Jahanara Imam, led the war-crime tribunal committee, Ekattorer Ghatak Dalal Nirmul Committee, advocating for the prosecution of Ghulam Azam, the leader of Jamaat-e-Islami and a convicted war criminal. On 26 March 1992, the committee organized mock trials in Dhaka, known as Gono Adalat (The People's Court), symbolically 'sentencing' individuals they accused of being war criminals.

In the 2001 general election, Bangladesh Nationalist party in coalition with Bangladesh Jamaat-e-Islami won the election. From 2001 to 2003, the leader of Bangladesh Jamaat-e-Islami Motiur Rahman Nizami served as the Minister of Agriculture, then as the Minister of Industry from 2003 to 2006, and general the secretary Ali Ahsan Mohammad Mojaheed served the Ministry of Social Welfare between 2001 and 2006.

=== International Crimes Tribunal (ICT) of 2010 ===
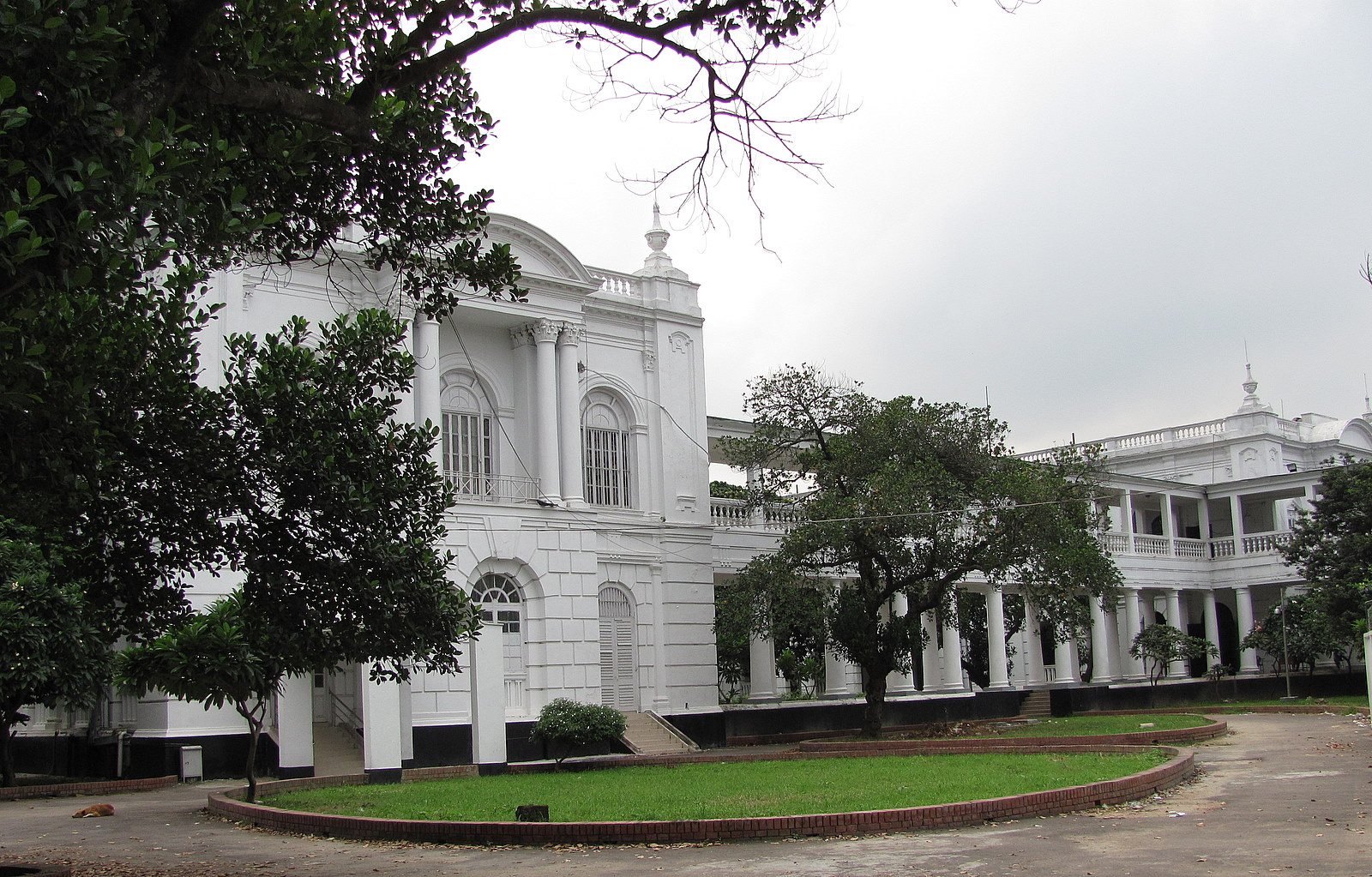
Old High Court Building, Dhaka, where the tribunal was taking place

Since 2000, there has been growing demands in Bangladesh for justice related to war crimes committed during the 1971 struggle; the issue was central to the 2008 general election.

The Awami League-led, 14-party Grand Alliance included this issue in its election manifesto. Its rival, four-party alliance (which included the BNP and Jamaat-e-Islami) had several leaders alleged to have committed war crimes.

The Grand Alliance won the election (held on 29 December 2008) with a two-thirds majority, based in part on its promise to prosecute alleged war criminals.

On 29 January 2009 the new Parliament unanimously passed a resolution to prosecute war criminals. The government intended to use the 1973 law: the International Crimes (Tribunals) Act. The government worked to amend the law, updating it and incorporating in it other nations' experience.

The amendments provided the legal basis for the trial of individuals and political parties that had committed war crimes during Bangladesh liberation war. The government was empowered to appeal tribunal decisions.

On 25 March 2010, the Awami-led government announced the formation of a three-member tribunal, a seven-member investigation agency, and a twelve-member prosecution team to conduct the trials under the ICT Act 1973. The panel of three judges included Fazle Kabir and Zahir Ahmed, with Mohammed Nizamul Huq as chairman. Abdul Matin, Abdur Rahim, Kutubur Rahman, Shamsul Arefin, Mir Shahidul Islam, Nurul Islam and M. Abdur Razzak Khan were appointed to assist the state prosecutors. Golam Arif Tipu was named Chief Prosecutor. Others prosecutors were Syed Rezaur Rahman, Golam Hasnayen, Rana Das Gupta, Zahirul Huq, Md. Nurul Islam Sujon, Syed Haider Ali, Khandaker Abdul Mannan, Mosharraf Hossain Kajal, Zead Al Malum, Sanjida Khanam, and Sultan Mahmud Semon.

=== Verdicts ===
A formal charge was filed by the prosecution against Abdul Quader Mollah on 18 December 2011. He was charged with:

- The Pallab murder
- Killing pro-liberation poet Meherunnesa, her mother and two brothers
- The Khondakar Abu Taleb killing
- The Ghatar Char and Bhawal Khan Bari killings
- The Alubdi mass killing (344 people)
- The rape and murder of Hazrat Ali and his family

On 5 February 2013, the ICT found Mollah guilty of crimes against humanity. The day before the verdict was announced, Bangladesh Jamaat-e-Islami announced a nationwide dawn-to-dusk general strike for 5 February in protest of their leader's conviction.

== Protesters' demands ==
Over several days, protesters increased their demands, asking for:

- Death penalty for Mollah
- Death sentences for those convicted of war crimes by the International War Crimes Tribunal
- A ban of Jamaat from Bangladeshi politics
- A boycott of Jamaat institutions

== Development ==
=== Origins ===
Protest began right after the verdict was announced. Student organizations started the protest immediately after the Judgement in the Shahbag square. On 7 February, demonstrations began at 8 am. Thousands of people gathered with banners, posters, Bangladeshi flags and placards in Shahbag with their demands. On Friday afternoon, a mass rally was held at Shahbag with an estimated attendance of more than 100,000.

On 12 February, protesters observed three minutes of silence at 4 pm at Shahbag and all across Bangladesh. In Dhaka, traffic was stopped as thousands of people took to the streets, formed human chains and stood in silence. A Bangladesh Premier League game at the Sher-e-Bangla National Stadium halted for three minutes, as players and supporters observed the silence. Parliamentarians and the police also joined the protest. Bengali singer Kabir Suman wrote a song entitled "Tin Minit" ("Three Minutes") in honour of the silent protest.

=== Further developments ===
On 21 February, International Mother Language Day, the number of protesters reached a new high. Its leadership declared 26 March 2013, the Independence Day of Bangladesh, as the deadline for the government to ban Jamaat-e-Islami from politics.

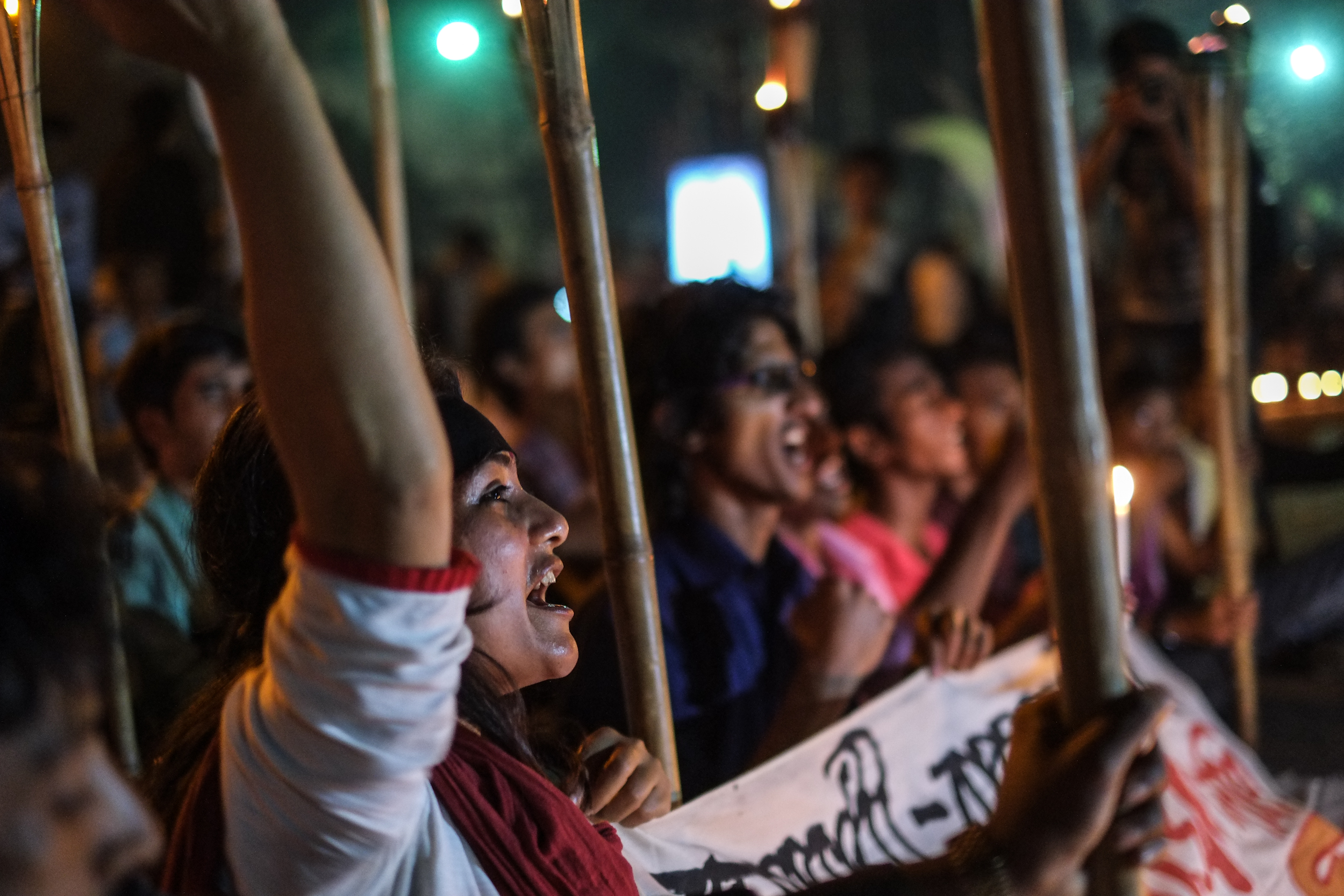
Protesters at Shahbag Square

Seven protesters began a fast until death on 26 March at 10:30 pm in front of the National Museum, protesting "inadequate government action" to ban Jamaat in response to the Shahbag protesters' ultimatum. The protesters said at a press briefing that they would send an open letter to Prime Minister Hasina during the 100th hour of their protests. More than 100 organizations expressed solidarity with the hunger strikers.

=== Sentencing of Delwar Hossain Sayeedi ===
On 28 February the International Crimes Tribunal sentenced Delwar Hossain Sayeedi, Nayeb-e-Ameer (vice-president) of Jamaat-e-Islami, to death for convictions on 8 out of 20 charges of war crimes and crimes against humanity committed during the 1971 Bangladesh Liberation War.

=== Counter-demonstrations ===
Jamaat followers were enraged by the decision, claiming that the case against Sayeedi was politically motivated. His lawyer, Abdur Razzaq, accused authorities of preventing a key witness from testifying and intentionally slanting the process. "This is a perverse judgment. It is inconceivable that a court of law awarded him a conviction. This prosecution was for a political purpose", Razzaq said. Jamaat quickly called for a nationwide two-day strike, to start on 3 March. By afternoon, violence led by Jamaat-e-Islami supporters had erupted across Bangladesh. "The Jamaat-e-Islami is fighting for its political survival", said a spokesperson. By the end of the day thirty-five people were dead, including three police officers; an additional eight hundred were injured. According to the BBC, it marked "the worst day of political violence in Bangladesh in decades".

Clashes between police and Jamaat-e-Islami workers continued on 1 March, spreading to the northern districts of Gaibandha and Chapai Nawabganj. Opposition leader Khaleda Zia criticised government and called for a demonstration in the capital, Dhaka. Security measures were increased to prevent the situation from escalating. The death toll rose to forty-four (including six policemen). Former prime minister and BNP member Khaleda Zia declared a nationwide dawn-to-dusk strike for 5 March, and called for countrywide rallies on 2 March to protest what she called government corruption, misrule, oppression, and "mass killings".

Violent conflict continued on 2 March, with another four deaths and hundreds of injuries. In Chittagong district police opened fire on Jamaat-e-Islami protesters, leading to three deaths. In Nilphamari, a young person died in a clash between protesters and police.

On 3 March, violence continued as the Jamaat-organised strike began. In Bogra Jamaat supporters attacked police outposts with sticks and homemade bombs, leading to at least eight deaths. In Godagari two deaths were reported in a similar incident, and three deaths were reported in the Joypurhat district. Violence continued in Chittagong as well, where Jamaat claimed that police opened fire without provocation. The government denied the charge, saying that violence against citizens and police would not be tolerated; three deaths were reported. "People in the street are very, very afraid of Jamaat-e-Islam. I am scared", reported an eyewitness in Dhaka. Jamaat supporters were accused of attacking Hindu citizens and their homes in many parts of the country, and torching Hindu temples. More than 40 temples and many statues were destroyed and scores of houses set ablaze, leaving hundreds of people homeless throughout the country.

Amnesty International has urged the Bangladeshi government to provide better protection for minority Hindus. Abbas Faiz, the organization's Bangladesh researcher, has noted that the attacks on the Hindu community were a shocking development in the recent history of Bangladesh.

== Reactions ==
=== Domestic response ===
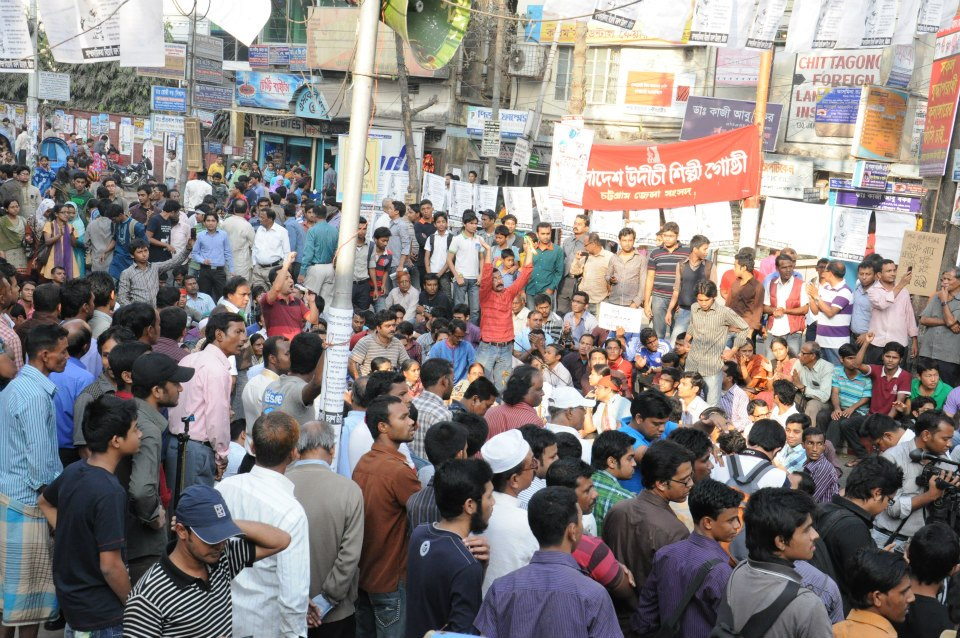
Protest in front of Chittagong Press Club

The Shahbag protests has attracted people from all walks of life and in Shahbag intersection at the centre of the protests has been referred to as "Generation Circle" (Bengali: প্রজন্ম চত্ত্বর Projônmo Chôttor) or "Shahbag Square", in a nod to the events which unfolded in Tahrir Square, Cairo. The protest spread from Shahbagh to other parts of the country, with sit-ins and demonstrations in Chittagong, Rajshahi, Khulna, Sylhet, Barisal, Mymensingh, Rajbari, Rangpur, Comilla, Bogra, Narayanganj, Sunamganj, Noakhali and Narsingdi.

=== Political response ===
State Minister for Law, Quamrul Islam, said that the verdict against Abdul Quader Mollah could have been different if people had taken to the streets sooner. The government is planning to file appeals with the Supreme Court contesting the sentence for Mollah. On 11 February the Cabinet approved proposed amendments to the International Crimes (Tribunals) Act 1973, introducing a provision for plaintiffs to appeal verdicts handed down by the tribunal. This amendment, if passed, would enable the state to appeal Mollah's life sentence.

Jamaat-e-Islami, which was already staging protests against the impending trial of its leaders, called for a general strike. Jamaat continues to demand that the international war crimes tribunal be stopped and its party leaders freed. Jamaat supporters had staged nationwide demonstrations with increasing frequency from November 2012 to February 2013, demanding the release of its leaders. Actions included firing gunshots, smashing and setting fire to vehicles and detonating homemade bombs. Violence was targeted at police stationed in the capital, Dhaka, and major cities such as Rajshahi, Cox's Bazar, Chittagong, Rangpur, Dinajpur and Khulna. Several Jamaat-Shibir political activists were arrested during the strikes and confrontations with police.

=== Reaction from Bangladeshis abroad ===
Bangladeshis abroad have expressed solidarity with the protests through social media websites Facebook and Twitter. Demonstrations of solidarity have also taken place in Australia, Malaysia, Germany, and the United States.

Bangladeshis in New York City joined in a symbolic protest on 9 February at Diversity Plaza in Jackson Heights. A mass sit-in was organised by the Bangladeshi community in Sydney on 10 February at the International Mother Language Monument in Sydney Ashfield Park. At a rally at the Angel Statue in Melbourne, demonstrators signed a petition to Bangladeshi Prime Minister Sheikh Hasina demanding death for war criminals.

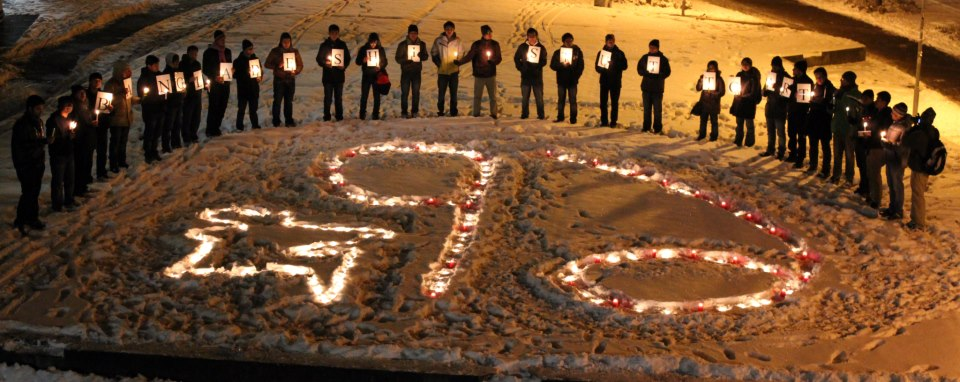
Shahbag protest supporters in Stuttgart

On 10 February, Bangladeshi students gathered at Rutgers University in New Jersey to express solidarity with the Shahbag protests. Bangladeshi students at the University of Delaware and nearby residents demonstrated their solidarity with the Shahbag movement on 15 February at a busy intersection in Newark, Delaware. A candlelight vigil was held that evening for Rajib, a blogger and human rights activist who was killed several hours before the demonstration.

In London, protesters at Altab Ali Park in solidarity for Shahbag were attacked by Jamaat-e-Islami supporters. Protests are held at the park every week by both sides.

=== International response ===
On 18 February British Foreign Office minister Sayeeda Warsi hailed the Shahbag Square protests, describing them as peaceful, productive and non-violent. An article in the Fletcher Forum of World Affairs by Suzannah Linton on 27 February expressed concern about "bloodlust in Bangladesh" and called on the international community to steer the process towards international standards.

== Media coverage ==
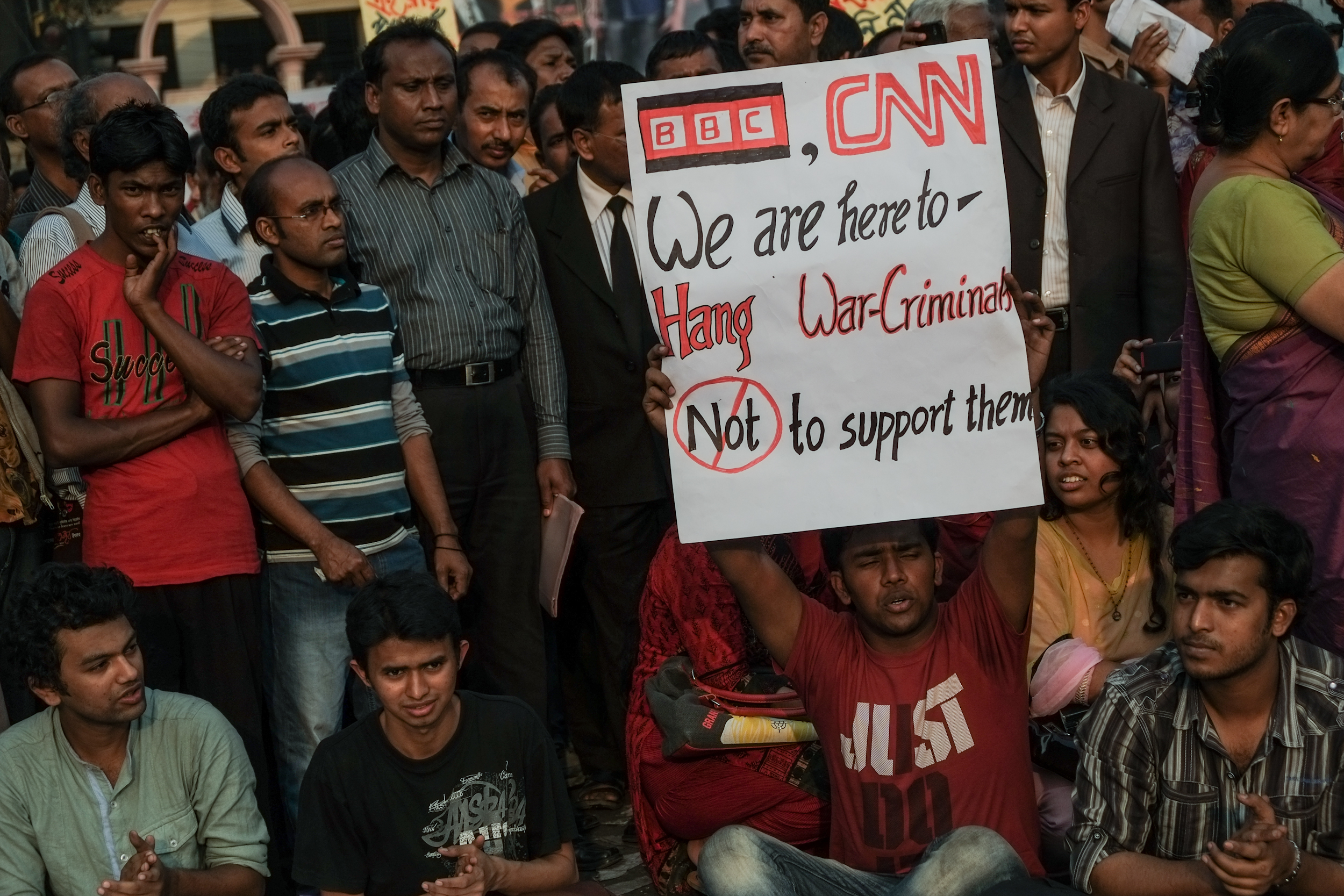
Protester showing placard to foreign media

International media outlets such as BBC, CNN, Al Jazeera English, The New York Times, and The Independent have published numerous reports and articles on the protests, with BBC Bangla closely monitoring and documenting the events. Additionally, Reuters photographer Andrew Biraj published live photographs from the massive Shahbag demonstrations.

Social media played a crucial role in disseminating news globally about events at Shahbag. A Facebook event was created, calling for a protest at Shahbag, resulting in the formation of the viral human chain on 5 February 2013. Facebook served as one of the primary sources of information about the Shahbag protests among its activists. Bangladeshis utilized the X (formally Twitter) hashtag #shahbag to provide live updates on the movement.

== Outcome ==
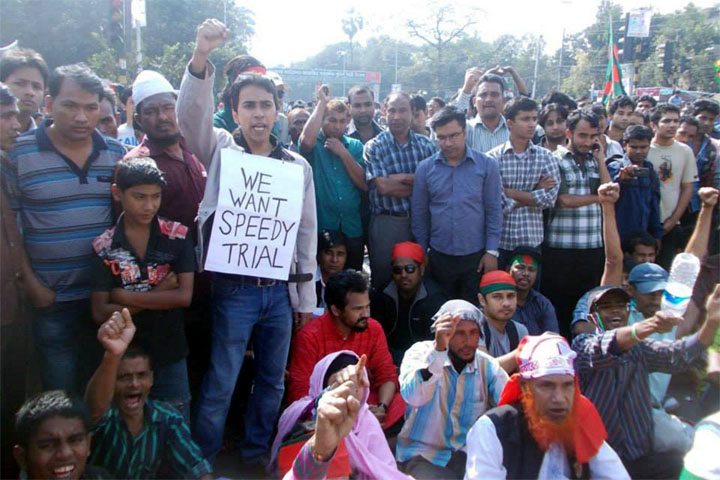
Protesters advocating for the swift execution of the convicted war criminal Abdul Quader Mollah, circa 11 December 2013.

The demonstration exerted pressure on the government, prompting amendments to the International Crimes Tribunal Act to facilitate the swift execution of war criminals upon conviction. The cabinet established a 60-day limit for the Supreme Court's Appellate Division to adjudicate appeals, ensuring expeditious case progress. In response to widespread protests, Jute and Textiles Minister Abdul Latif Siddiqui announced on 12 February that a bill is in the drafting stage to prohibit Jamaat-e-Islami from participating in Bangladeshi politics.

On 17 September 2013, the Bangladesh Supreme Court found Abdul Quader Mollah guilty of several counts of premeditated murder and war crimes which were committed during the 1971 Bangladesh Liberation War and ordered his execution. He was subsequently executed on 12 December 2013.

== Controversies surrounding the protests ==
- During the movement, protesters used various slogans. These included "Ekta ekta Shibir dhor, dhoira dhoira jobai kor." ("Catch Bangladesh Islami Chhatra Shibir activists one by one, and slaughter them."), "Rajakarer chamra, kutta diya kamra." ("Make dogs chew on the skin of razakars."), among others, which were accused of promoting violence. Threats were directed against academic Piash Karim for his stance against the tribunals, while boycotts and death threats were declared against Asif Nazrul, Farhad Mazhar and Motiur Rahman Chowdhury.
- The Awami League fully supported the prosecution of the individuals who were responsible for the genocide and war crimes committed during the 1971 War of Liberation. Since the beginning of the war tribunal proceedings held by the International Crimes Tribunal, which consisted of a three-member judge, a seven-member investigation agency, and a twelve-member prosecution team, 83 individuals have been prosecuted, with 52 receiving the death penalty. Many critics argue that the movement was partially orchestrated by the government to garner public support for the prosecution of the far-right Bangladesh Jamaat-e-Islami leaders, thereby consolidating power 42 years after the war.
- On 25 October 2014, a Shahbag movement's leader named Mahmudul Haque Munshi attempted to hurl a shoe at the vehicle carrying the coffin of Golam Azam after his funeral. Shahbag protesters called for boycotting institutions run by Bangladesh Jamaat-e-Islam political leaders such as Islami Bank and Retina Coaching Centre. The Bangladesh Chhatra League was accused of coercing students from various residential halls of the University of Dhaka to join the rallies. Mass protests were held, urging the boycott of certain right-wing media outlets critical of the war tribunals, which included Diganta Television, Daily Naya Diganta, Amar Desh, and The Daily Sangram,
- Shahbag is home to many important, national and largest hospitals in Dhaka, including BIRDEM General Hospital, Ibrahim Medical College. The prolonged blockade of this crucial and sensitive road by protesters for over a month was accused of causing substantial suffering for patients.

== Timeline ==
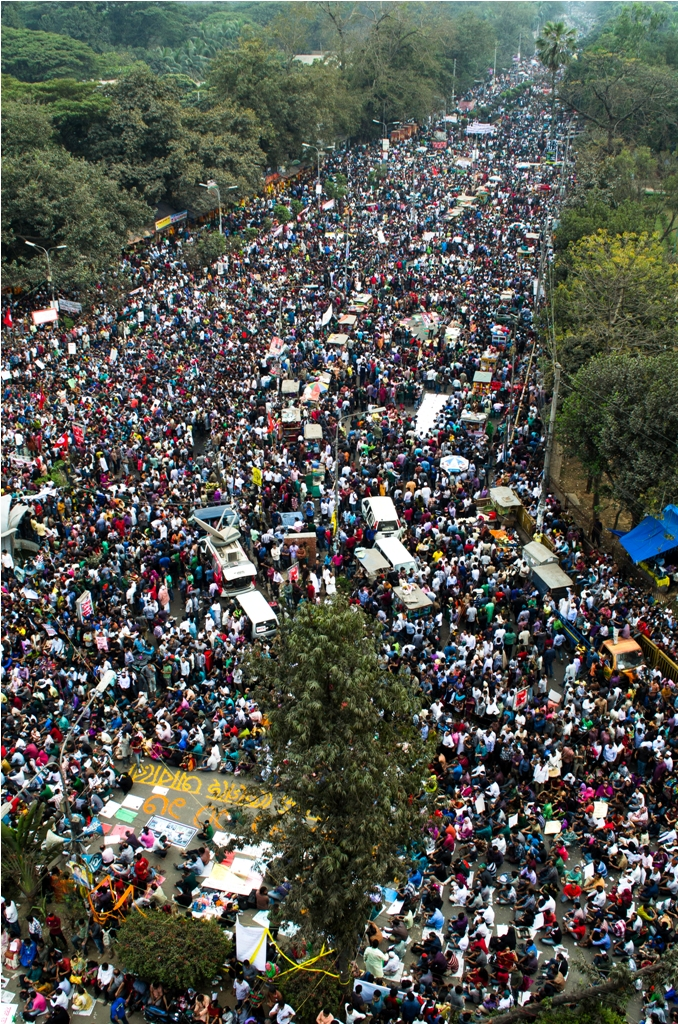
Protesters in Shahbag

In the wake of Abdul Quader Mollah's life imprisonment sentence on 5 February, the Shahbag protests unfolded with increasing intensity, expanding beyond Shahbag Square to other cities and towns.

- 5 February - Abdul Quader Mollah is sentenced to life imprisonment. Initial gathering of protesters in Shahbag Square (also known as Shahbag Circle).
- 6–7 February - Protests intensify, crowds grow bigger, other cities and towns pick up protest. Bangladeshi diaspora and student communities abroad also begin to express solidarity with the protest.
- 8 February - Hundreds of thousands attend afternoon rallies in Shahbag and nationwide. Muhammed Zafar Iqbal and others address the crowds.
- 9–10 February - Protest continues countrywide.
- 12 February - A 3 minute silence is observed in Shahbag and all across the country. Bangladesh Islami Chhatra Shibir attempts to disrupt with a mid-day rally which quickly turns violent as they use guns and bombs against police.
- 15 February - Protester and blogger Ahmed Rajib Haider is killed. Haider had actively participated in the protest from the beginning and had written several blogs against Bangladesh Jamaat-e-Islami activities.
- 16 February - Thousands of people from all professions gather at Shahbag wearing black badges to show their respect on the death of Ahmed Rajib Haider. By touching the coffin, protesters swear not to return home leaving their demands unfulfilled.
- 17 February - Various schools in Dhaka hoist the national flag and sing the national anthem to express solidarity with Shahbag protesters. The Shahbag activists announce a "grand rally" to be held on 21 February and reiterate their demand of death penalty for war criminals.
- 18 February - The Shahbag protests continues for the 14th day. Bangladesh Khilafat Andolan and Islami Oikya Jote demand the death penalty for top bloggers (Omi Rahman Pial, Ibrahim Khalil, Arif Jebtik and Asif Mohiuddin) of the ongoing Shahbag movement.
- 19 February - British foreign office minister Baroness Sayeeda Warsi praises the Shahbag Square protest, describing it as peaceful and productive. Shahbag protesters vow to spread their movement to the grassroots level by making 'Gonojagoron Mancha' (mass-upsurge stage) like Shahbag Square at every corner of the country.
- 20 February - Alleged "smear campaign" against Shahbag activists, branding them as anti-Islamic and anti-social elements by appealing to the religious sentiments of the people and at the same time trying to brand Haider as an atheist to justify his murder.
- 21 February - After the movement ran for two weeks, with huge participation from masses of people, in the grand rally at Shahbag held on 21 February 2013 in the afternoon, Imran H Sarker presents six demands before the people. An intelligence agency releases a message to the news media and law enforcement agencies which states that some "anti-state elements" will try to carry out destructive activities including suicide bomb attacks on places like Shahbag, Shaheed Minar, Dhaka and Baitul Mukarram. Law enforcement agencies arrest several Bangladesh Jamaat-e-Islami leaders and Bangladesh Islami Chhatra Shibir political activists carrying explosives and planning to attack Shaheed Minar.
- 22 February - Shahbag Ganajagaran Mancha calls for nationwide protest just 1 day after calling off their demonstration at Shahbag. This happens after Jamaat political and radical Islamists went on a rampage in Dhaka city, clashing with police and attacking them with bombs and stones. Jamaat Islamists destroy the Sylhet Central Shaheed Minar setting on fire the national flag of Bangladesh and flowers.
- 6 March - The Shahbag protests has completed in one month. What started from the bloggers and online activists, has turned into a mass uprising, spread across the country to people from all walks of life, and among the expatriate Bangladeshis.

== Photos ==
Domestic
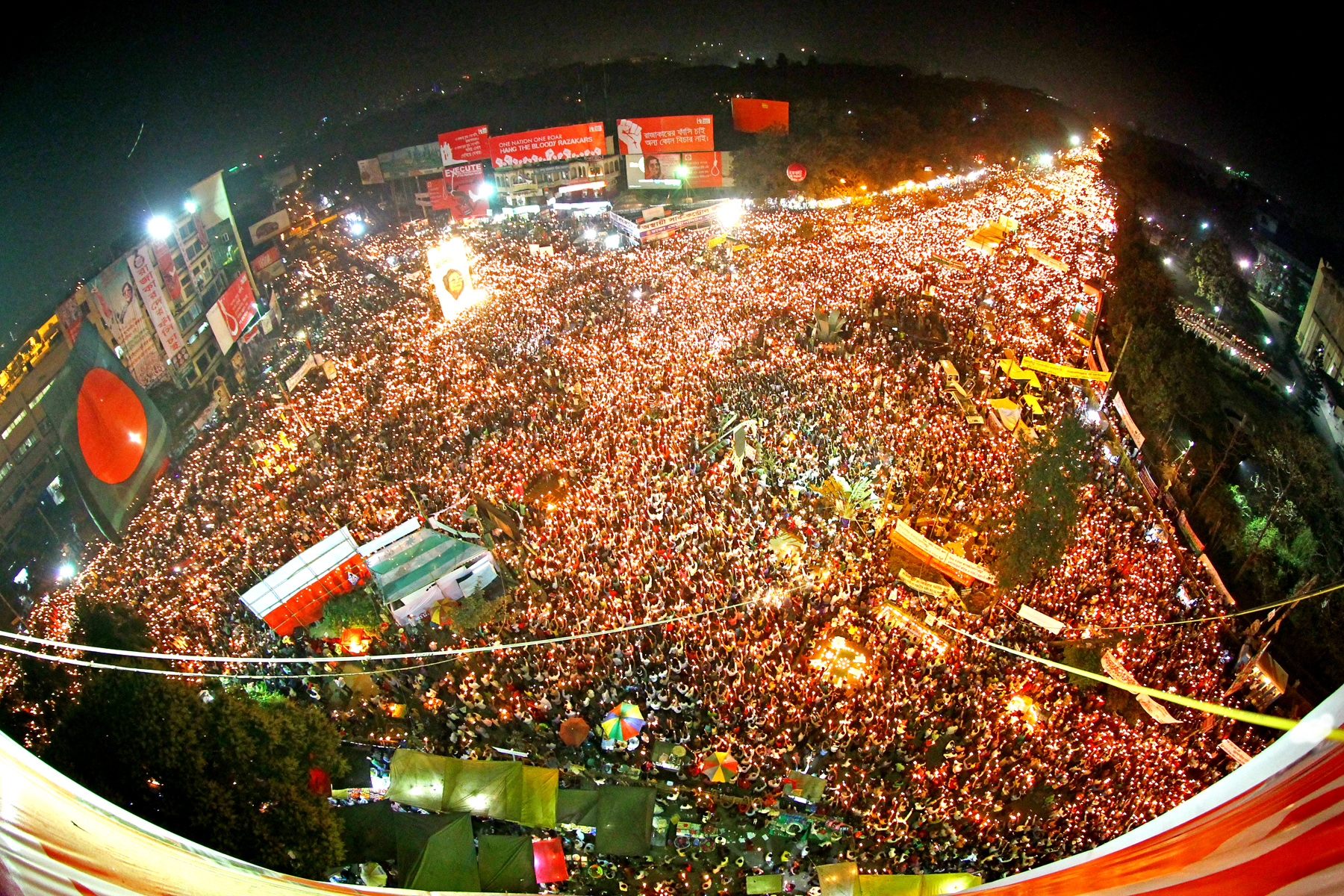
Protesters in Shahbag

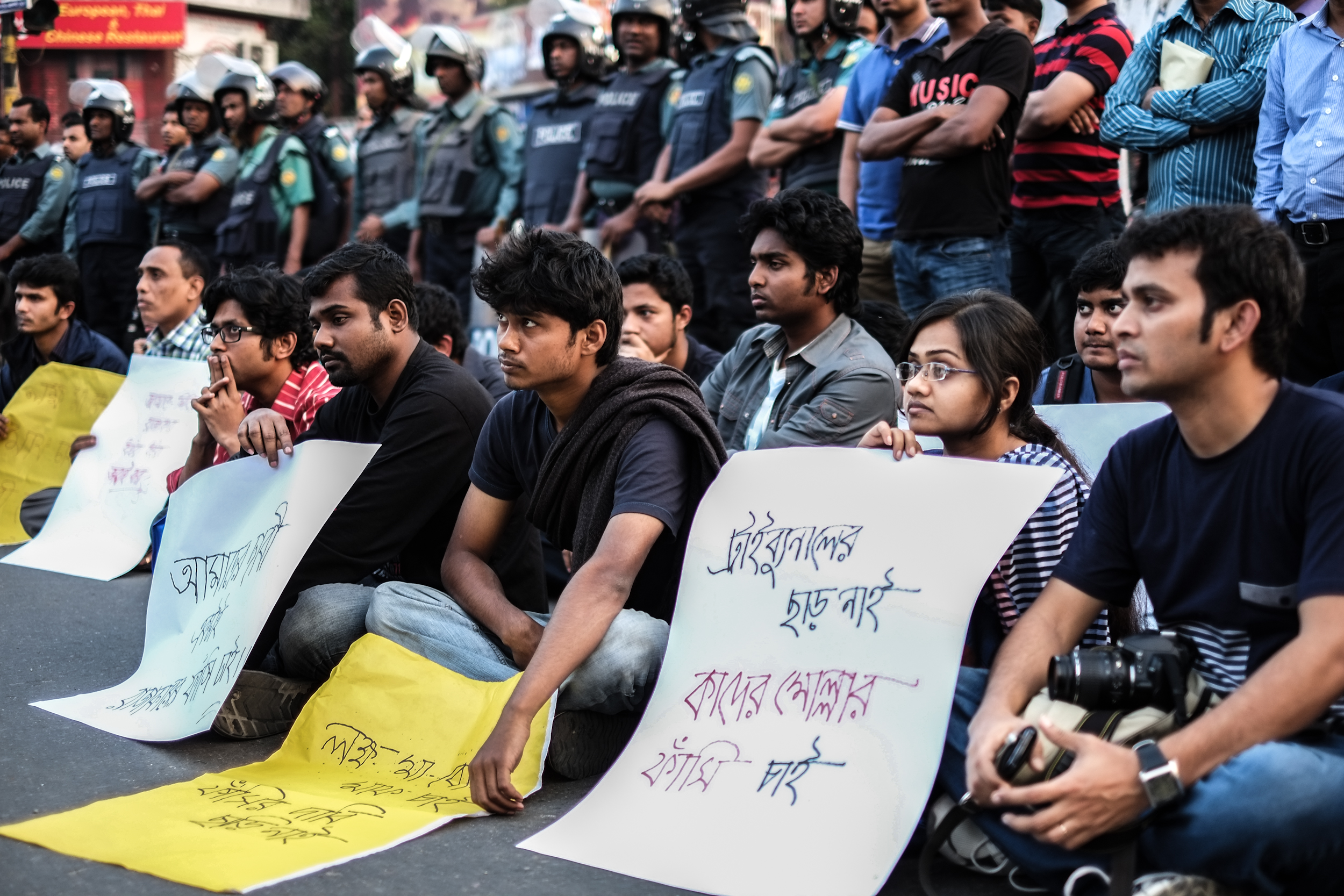
Placards with demands

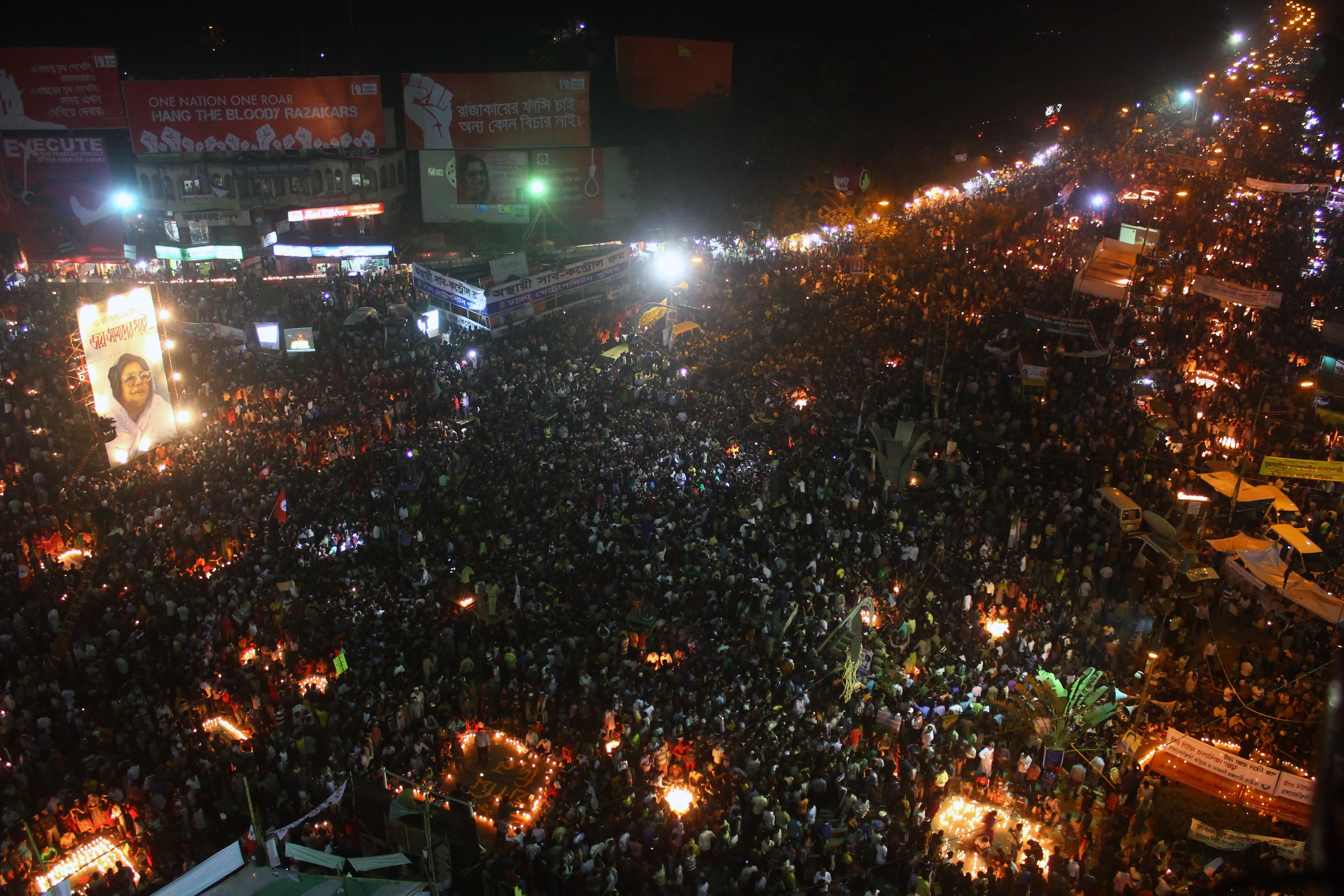
Candlelight vigil

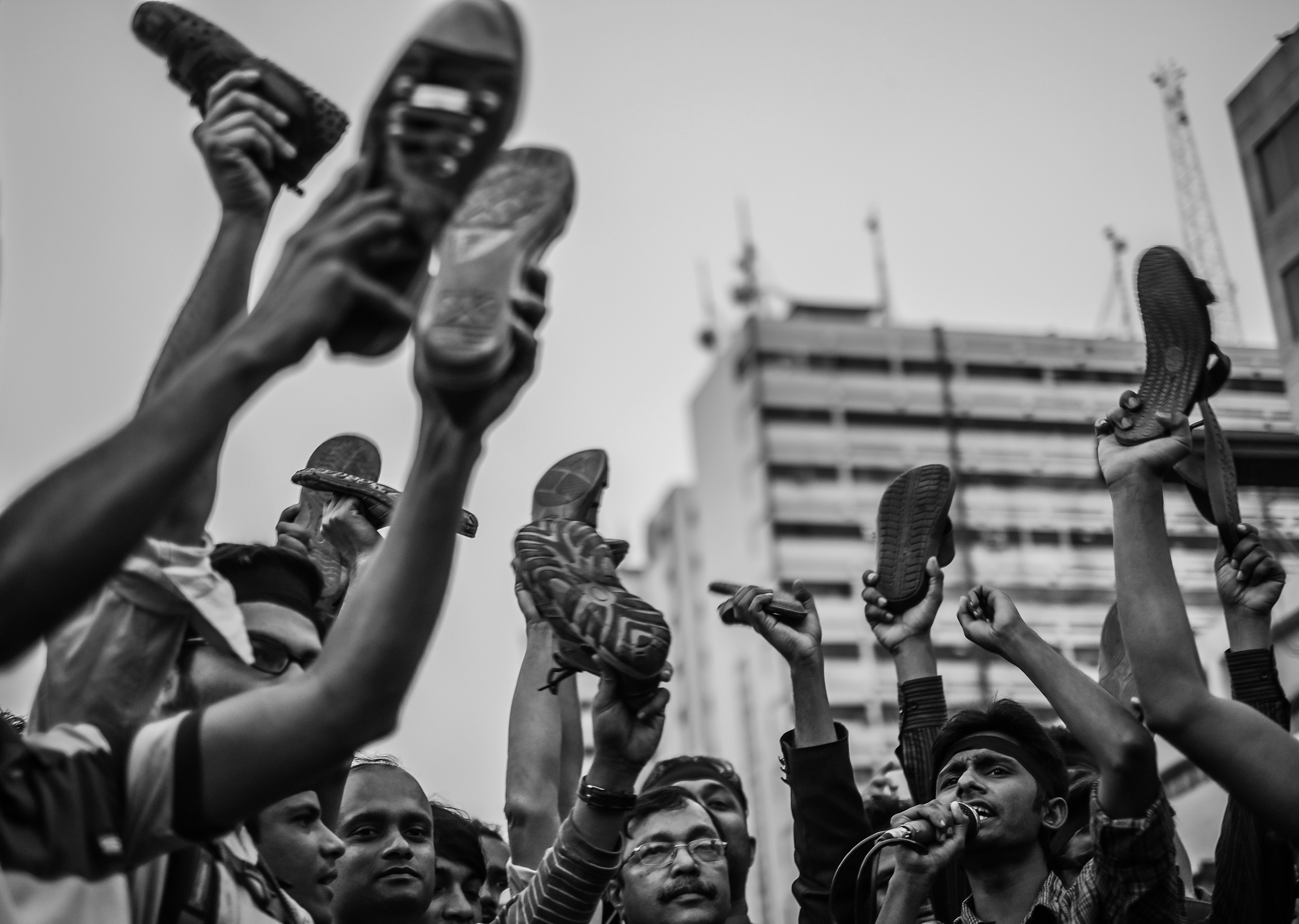
Displaying shoes for war criminals
Overseas
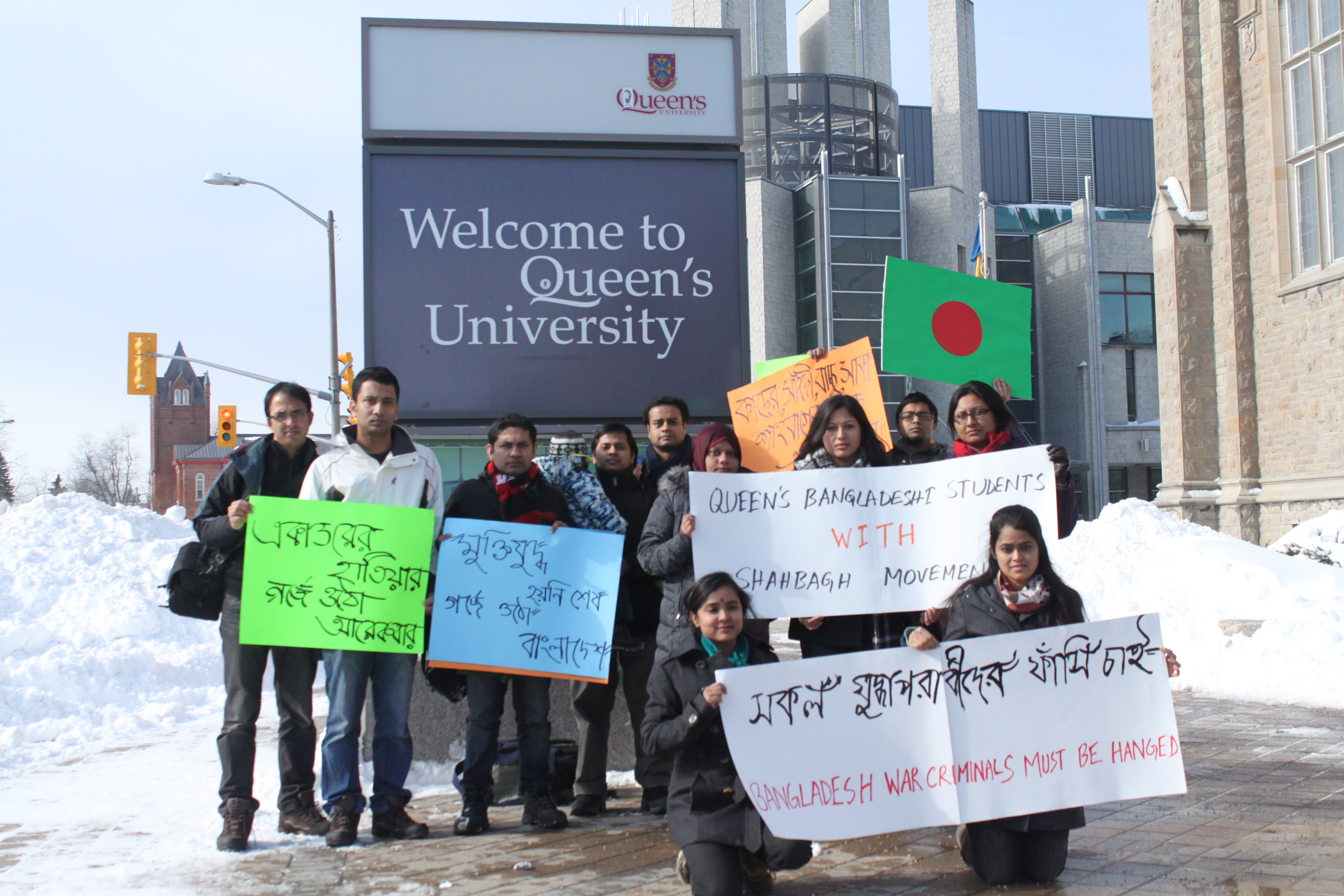
Students at Queen's University, Kingston, Ontario, Canada

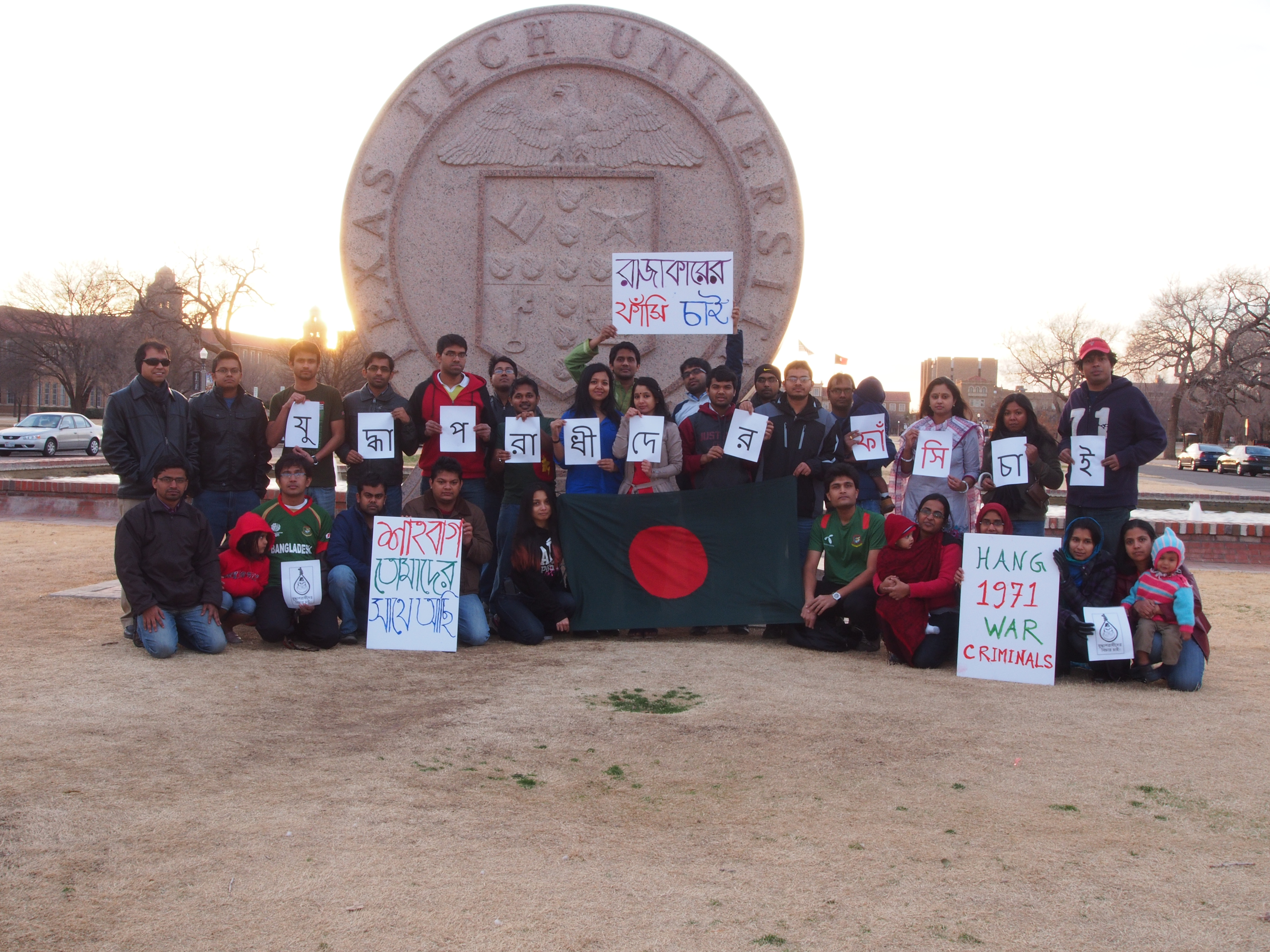
Students at Texas Tech University, Lubbock, Texas, United States

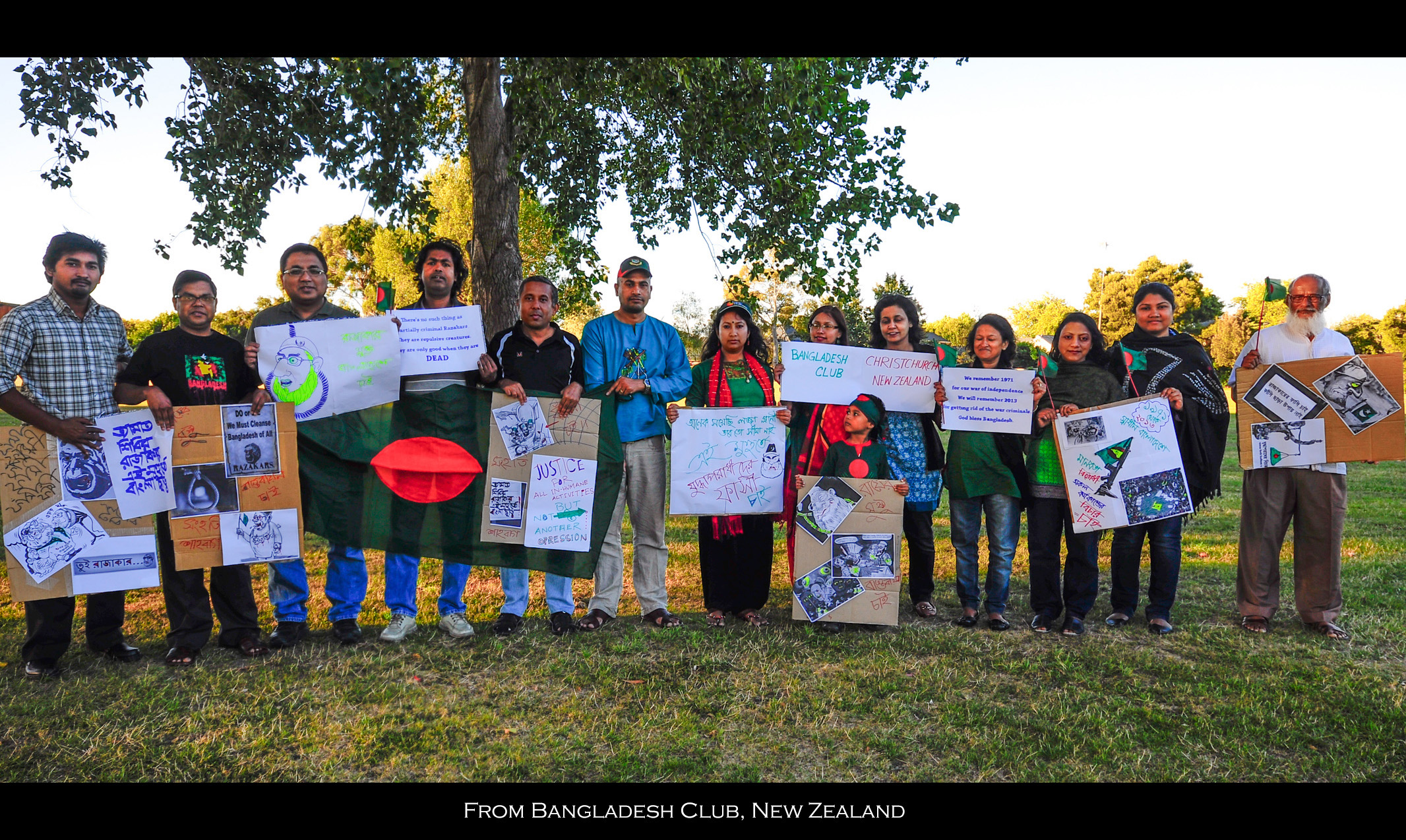
Bangladeshis in New Zealand

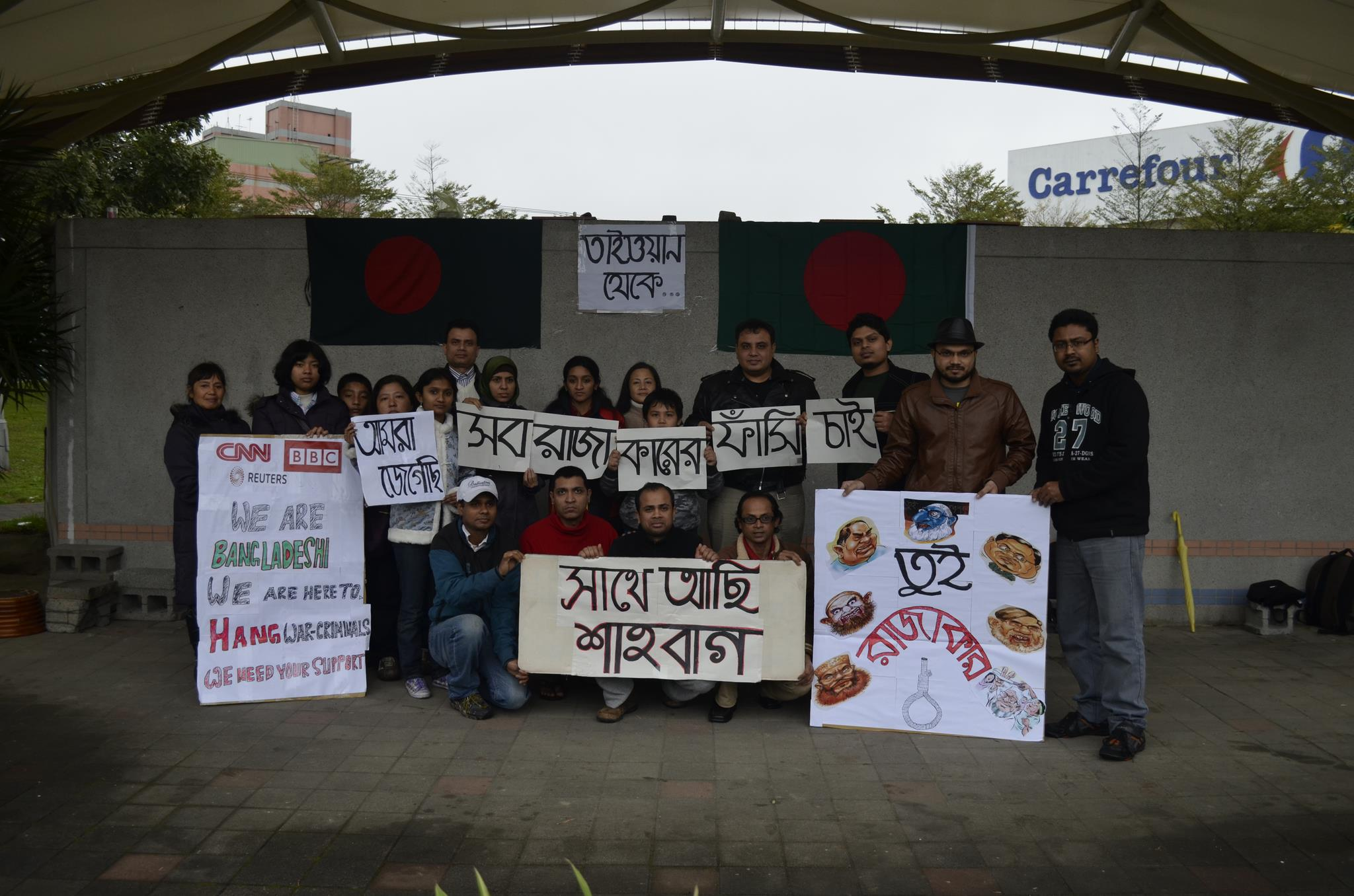
Bangladeshis in Taipei, Taiwan

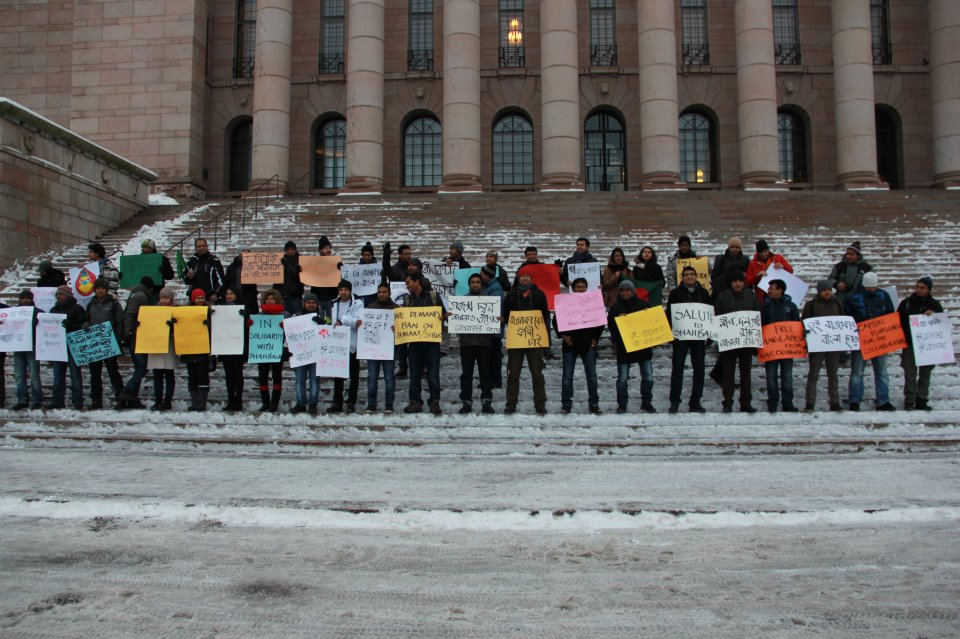
Demonstrators in Helsinki, Finland

== See also ==
- Timeline of the 2013 Shahbagh protests
- Movement demanding trial of war criminals
- 2013 Shapla Square protests
- 2018 Bangladesh quota reform protests
- 2018 Bangladesh road safety protests
- 2024 Bangladesh quota reform protests
- 2025 Awami League ban protests
