= Liberation of Mirpur =

Battle in Bangladesh

Liberation of Mirpur refers to the Liberation of Mirpur Thana in Dhaka on 31 January 1972 by Bangladesh Armed Forces after the end of Bangladesh War of Independence.

== Background ==
During the Bangladesh War of Independence, Mirpur remained pro-Pakistan. Bengalis living in Mirpur were threatened and attacked by pro-Pakistani Biharis. Bengali poet, Meherunnesa, was killed by Bihari inhabitants of Mirpur along with her family members. Bangladesh became an independent country on 16 December 1971. Mirpur Thana, mostly inhabited by Biharis, remained under the control of pro-Pakistani paramilitary forces, even after the independence of Bangladesh. Many of the inhabitants were members of pro-Pakistan paramilitary forces like the Razakars, Al-Badr, and Al-Shams. They possessed weapons and ammunition, given to them by the Pakistan Army. After the war ended, Bihari neighborhoods were guarded by Indian Army soldiers. On 30 January 1972, Indian Army personnel were withdrawn, as their guarding of Biharis had become a source of tension between Bangladeshis and Indians.

== History ==
On 30 January 1972, the Bangladesh Armed Forces had surrounded Mirpur and began preparations to "liberate Mirpur". Bengali filmmaker, Zahir Raihan, went to Mirpur after someone called him about his missing brother, Shahidullah Kaiser, who was previously kidnapped by members of the Al-Badr. Zahir Raihan was never seen again. The soldiers started searching Mirpur and Mohammadpur Thana for weapons and curfew was imposed on the area. Biharis in Mohammadpur had shot at a group of Bengali refugees returning home, wounding 6 and killing one. Gunfights broke out in Mohammadpur and Mirpur between Biharis and soldiers of the Bangladesh Armed Forces. Journalists were not permitted to enter while soldiers searched for weapons. United Nations representative, Vittorio Winspeare-Guicciardi visited the camp, where Biharis asked him to help them move to Pakistan.

After the surrender of Pakistan Army and the independence of Bangladesh, Mirpur was the last stronghold of pro-Pakistan forces. Golam Helal Morshed Khan commanded the Bangladeshi forces composed 82 personnel of Bangladesh Army and 200 personnel of Bangladesh Police. His commanding officer was Major Moinul Hossain Chowdhury, who sent Second Lieutenant Selim Mohammad Kamrul Hasan, who was killed in action, to support him. The battle saw heavy gunfights between the armed forces and pro-Pakistani paramilitaries. After losing 42 army personnel and 82 police personnel, Khan retreated from Mirpur to an Indian army base. Mirpur was liberated after reinforcements were sent from different cantonments of Bangladesh.

== Legacy ==
In Bangladesh, 31 January is marked as Victory Day of Mirpur or Mirpur Mukto Dibosh. Abdul Quader Mollah, nicknamed "Butcher of Mirpur", was hanged for his role in the death of poet, Meherunnesa, and journalist Khandker Abu Taleb, on 13 December 2013.
