= Mirpur Mukto Dibos =

Mirpur Mukto Dibos marks the Liberation of Mirpur thana in Dhaka after the Bangladesh Liberation War of 1971 the Pakistan Army killed three million people. This was the second largest genocide since World War II. As Mirpur, an important part of Dhaka city, was occupied by Biharis from early March and freed after 45 days it is especially important compared to other places in Bangladesh. On 31 January 1972, when Mirpur was freed, is generally known as Mirpur Mukto Dibos (Victory Day of Mirpur).

== Killing Fields of Mirpur ==
Notable killing fields of Mirpur are Bangla College Killing Field, Muslimbazar Killing Field, Jalladkhana Killing Field, Sialbari Killing Field

== See also ==
- Bangladesh Liberation War
