= Movement demanding trial of war criminals (Bangladesh) =

Protest movement in Bangladesh

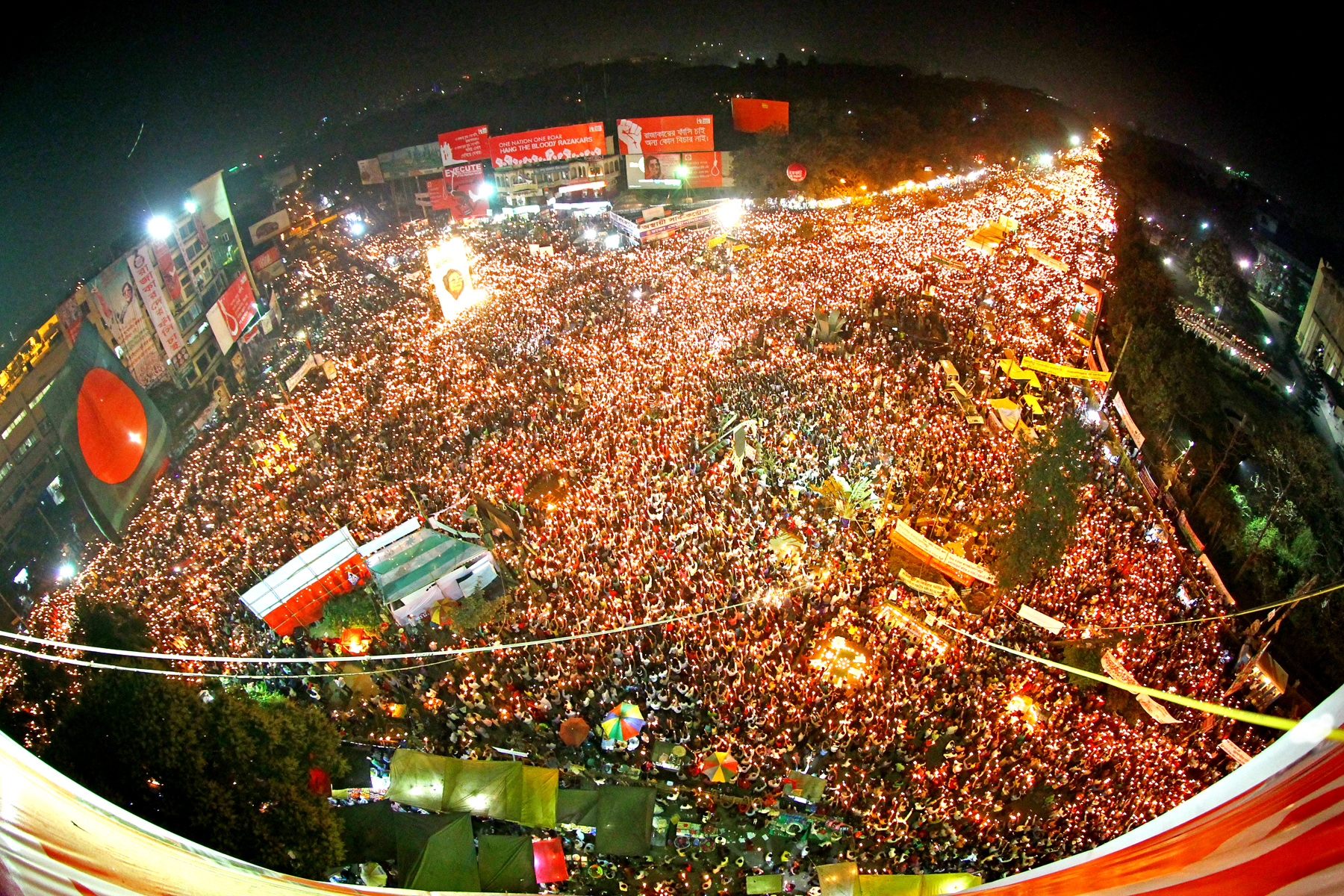
- Location: Bangladesh
- Caused by: Protest for the capital punishment of war criminals of 1971; Ban the political rights of Jamat-e-Islami; Boycott all financial organizations of Jamat-e-Islami
- Methods: Civil conflict; Protest; Online protest

The movement demanding trial of war criminals (Bengali: যুদ্ধাপরাধীদের বিচারের দাবিতে আন্দোলন) is a protest movement in Bangladesh, from 1972 to present demanding trial of the perpetrators of 1971 Bangladesh genocide during the Bangladesh Liberation War from Pakistan.

== Background ==
The Bangladesh Liberation War started on 26 March 1971 after Pakistan Army launched Operation Searchlight on 25 March. During Operation Searchlight, Pakistan Army attacked East Pakistan Rifles, East Pakistan Ansar, and Rajarbagh police barracks. The soldiers also attacked the University of Dhaka and Hindu majority neighbourhoods in the city. The Pakistan Army target civilians in their war effort. These actions are collectively known as the 1971 Bangladesh Genocide. From 14 to 16 December, Pakistan Army and local collaborators targeted and killed Bengali academics, writers, doctors and other intellectuals. The two days are known as the 1971 killing of Bengali intellectuals. The war lasted until 16 December when Pakistan surrendered to a joint forces of Indian military and Bangladeshi Mukti Bahini.

After the Independence of Bangladesh, the Sheikh Mujibur Rahman led government passed the Bangladesh Collaborators (Special Tribunals) Order, 1972 on 24 January for the trial of war criminals and collaborators of Pakistan Army. On 20 July 1973, the government passed the separate International Crimes (Tribunals) Act, 1973 for the trial of Pakistani soldiers accused of war crimes. On 30 November 1973, the government of Bangladesh issued a pardon for collaborators who were not charged with war crimes such as rape, murder, arson etc. Total collaborators in custody was 37 thousand of whom 26 thousand were released after the amnesty.

President Sheikh Mujibur Rahman was killed in the 15 August 1975 Bangladeshi coup d'état and Awami League government overthrown. Major General Ziaur Rahman repealed the Bangladesh Collaborators (Special Tribunals) Order, 1972 which paved the way for the release of all detained collaborators and war crime accused.

== 1972 ==
In 1972, the spouses of martyred intellectuals started the peaceful protest. Wife of Zahir Raihan, who was killed in January 1972 by Bihari collaborators of Pakistan Army, took first step for this. Zahir Raihan's brother, Shahidullah Kaiser, was a victim of enforced disappearance by local collaborators including Abdul Majid Majumder, office secretary of Dhaka District unit of Jamaat-e-Islami, identified by witnesses of the abduction.

== 1992 ==
As the ruler of Bangladesh, President Ziaur Rahman (1975–1981) enacted several controversial measures, ostensibly to win the support of Islamic political parties and opponents of the Awami League. In 1978, he revoked the ban on the Jamaat-e-Islami, which was widely believed to have collaborated with the Pakistani army and members of which are alleged to have committed war crimes against civilians.

Ghulam Azam, the exiled chief of the Jammat-e-Islami, was allowed to come back to Bangladesh in July 1978 with a Pakistani Passport. In 1991 December Ghulam Azam, was elected the Amir of Jamaat-e-Islam. Subsequently, Jahanara Imam organized the Ghatak-Dalal Nirmul Committee (Bengali: ঘাতক দালাল নির্মূল সমিতি ; Translation: Committee to exterminate the Killers and Collaborators). The committee called for the trial of people who committed crimes against humanity in the 1971 Bangladesh Liberation War in collaboration with the Pakistani forces. The Ghatak-Dalal Nirmul Committee set up mock trials in Dhaka in March 1992 known as Gono Adalat (Court of the people) and sentenced persons they accused of being war criminals. Imam and others were charged with treason. This charge was, however, dropped in 1996 after her death by the Chief Advisor Mohammed Habibur Rahman of the Caretaker government of that time.

== 2007 ==
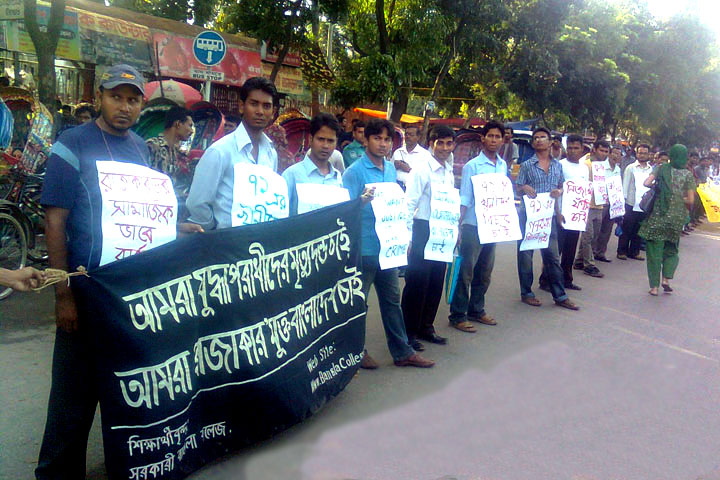
Human chain by the students of Govt. Bangla College

On 2007, at the regime of military backed Caretaker government, students of Govt. Bangla College took step for mass protest like human chain, symbolic hunger strike, rally, discussion, silence protest, flower placement demanding trial of war criminals of 1971 and to build monument for martyrs in Bangla College Killing Field. Organizations based on Liberation war, cultural organization, political parties expressed deep support to this movement led and co-ordinated by general students. Students played strong role in street from 2007 to 2010 and also continues activity in internet.

Post Liberation Students Union for Better Bangladesh (PSUBD) held protests and demonstrations urging trial of war criminals. Students from most of the universities in Dhaka joined the protest, demonstrations and human chains organised by PSUBD.

== 2008 ==
PSUBD continued to demand the trial of war criminals by holding protests, demonstrations, human chains and other activities to gain public support on the issue. Before the general election'08 PSUBD organised demonstration at TSC urging not to vote war criminals. Sector Commanders Forum calls for protest.

== Aftermath ==
In 2010, the Awami League led Government of Bangladesh established the International Crimes Tribunal (Bangladesh) for the trial of war criminals from Bangladesh Liberation War under an amended version of the International Crimes (Tribunals) Act, 1973.

=== 2013 Shahbag protests ===
The 2013 Shahbag protests, associated with a central neighbourhood of Dhaka, Bangladesh, began on February 5, 2013, and later spread to other parts of Bangladesh, as people demanded capital punishment for Abdul Quader Mollah, who had been sentenced to life imprisonment, and for others convicted of war crimes by the International Crimes Tribunal. On that day, the International Crimes Tribunal had sentenced Abdul Quader Mollah to life in prison after he was convicted on five of six counts of war crimes. Later demands included banning the Bangladesh Jamaat-e-Islami party from politics and a boycott of institutions supporting (or affiliated with) the party.
