= MP Hostel =

Bangladeshi residential buildings for MPs and their families

MP Hostel, Tejgaon
- Interactive map of the MP Hostel, Tejgaon area

General information
- Type: Residential
- Location: West Nakhalpara, Tejgaon, Dhaka, Bangladesh
- Coordinates: 23°46′04″N 90°23′34″E
- Opened: Pakistan period
- Owner: Government of Bangladesh

In Bangladesh an MP Hostel is a residential building where member of the parliament can live there individually or with his family. In Tejgaon area of Dhaka city there was an MP Hostel during Pakistan Regime, it is located in West Nakhalpara.

Recent Bangladeshi Governments have made new MP Hostels in Sher-e-Bangla Nagor area and in Nakhalpara.
