= Khondakar Abu Taleb =

Bangladeshi journalist

Chief reporter of The Daily Ittefaq

Personal details
- Born: 23 March 1921
- Died: 29 March 1971 (aged 50)

Khondakar Abu Taleb (1921-1971) was a Bangladeshi journalist, who was killed by the Pakistani Army in the Bangladesh Liberation War and is considered a "martyr" in Bangladesh.

== Early life and education ==
Taleb was born on 23 March 1921 in Satani, Satkhira, East Bengal, British Raj. He finished school from Satkhira PN School in 1944. He graduated from Kolkata Ripon College. In 1948, he competed his bachelor's degree in commerce and in 1956, he completed his law degree from Surendranath Law College.

== Career ==
Taleb started his journalism career in Kolkata, West Bengal, after the partition of India he moved to Dhaka, East Bengal. He worked in a number of East Bengal newspapers, including Pakistan Observer, Sangbad, Daily Azad, Ittefaq and Paigam. From 1961 to 1962, he was the general secretary of East Pakistan Journalist union. Till 1965, he was the chief reporter of the Daily Ittefaq.

In 1966, the Pakistan government closed down Ittefaq. He joined the Daily Sandhya Awaz as the managing director, of which then Abdul Gaffar Choudhury was the editor. His paper was the first to the publish the Six Point demand of Sheikh Mujib in Bangla, which demanded autonomy of East Pakistan. The translation was personally done by him. In 1969, he joined a law firm as a consultant and worked as the feature editor of the Daily Paigam. He was supportive of the non-cooperation movement in East Pakistan and Bangladesh Liberation War in 1971.

== Death and legacy ==
Taleb was arrested on 29 March 1971 by members of Pakistan Army with collaboration of the Biharis in Mirpur. His dead body was found afterwards. On 14 December 1993, the Bangladesh Post Office released commemorative stamps with his image and name.

In 2011, Abdul Quader Molla, a leader of the Jamaat-e-Islami, was charged by the Bangladesh International Crimes Tribunal with the killing of Taleb, among five other charges of crimes against humanity. The charge was that Molla along with other members of Al Badr and non-Bangalees, detained Taleb from Mirpur 10 bus stand and tied him up with a rope, brought to the Mirpur Jallad Khana Pump House and killed. In 2013, Molla was found guilty and sentenced to 15 years imprisonment for the murder of Taleb, and life imprisonment on other charges. Many activists reacted to the verdict by protesting and demonstrating, demanding the death penalty, which culminated in the 2013 Shahbag protests. The Supreme Court revised the sentence to death, and Molla was hanged in 2013.
