= Meherun Nesa =

Bengali poet (1942–1971)

- Born: 20 August 1942; Khidirpur, Bengal, British India
- Died: 27 March 1971 (aged 28); West Nakhalpara, Dhaka, East Pakistan
- Citizenship: Pakistan
- Occupations: Poet, cultural activists

Meherun Nesa (20 August 1942 – 27 March 1971) was a poet and martyred Bengali intellectual of the Bangladesh Liberation War.

== Early life ==
Nesa was born on 20 August 1942 in Khidirpur, Kolkata, West Bengal, British Raj. She did not attend school but was self-taught. She moved with her family to East Bengal, Pakistan in 1950 after the partition of India.

== Career ==
Nesa worked as a copywriter in Bangla Academy, after which she worked at the Philips Radio Company starting in 1961. She worked as a copywriter in the USIS Library Dhaka operated by United States Information Agency.

Nesa published her first poem, Chashi (চাষি), in 1953 in the Daily Sangbad. Her poems were influenced by romanticism and realism, and expressed her political views. She demanded Bangla to be made a state language through her poetry. Her poems were published by a number of publications including Pakistani Khabar, Dainik Pakistan, Sangram and Philips Magazine, etc.

She was involved in the Mass uprising of 1969, and member of the Action Committee in Mirpur. On 23 March 1971 she hoisted the flag of Independent Bangladesh in her house.

== Death ==
On 27 March 1971 her house in Mirpur, Dhaka was attacked by local collaborators of Pakistan army including Biharis. She along with her family were killed by them. Her two brothers and mother were killed along with her.

The Bangladesh post office released stamps with her image on 14 December 1995.

== Trial for killing Meherun Nesa ==
Abdul Quader Mollah, the leader of Jamaat-e-Islami Bangladesh, was charged with her death and the death of her family. Mollah was hanged on 12 December 2013.
