= Bangla College killing field =

Massacres committed by Pakistan

The Bangla College killing field (Bengali: বাঙলা কলেজ বধ্যভূমি) is located in the Mirpur area of Dhaka, Bangladesh. In 1971, during the Bangladesh Liberation War, the Pakistani army killed 3 million Bangladeshis with the help of local collaborators. It has been claimed to be the largest genocide after World War II. Bangladesh officially became independent on 16 December 1971, but the neighborhood of Mirpur was liberated from Pakistan Army and local Bihari people on 31 January 1972, 45 days after the declaration of independence was signed. Mirpur was largely inhabited by Biharis who were against the secession movement, so genocide took place on a large scale. Mirpur was the last battlefield of the war. Bangla College is one of the largest killing fields in Bangladesh.

== Events ==
In 1971, Pakistan army and local collaborators established a war camp at Bangla College and killed thousands of people. Inside the college presently between the Big Gate and Shahid Minar a pond marks where the army killed civilians. The administration building was turned into a torture cell. Those shot lay near the low land of the (present) hostel. The Army beheaded fighters and civilians in the mango tree garden near the principal's residence. Heads would fall down on one side and bodies on the other. The genocide continued throughout the war. In the aftermath, the campus and its surroundings were filled with beheaded corpses and skeletons.
