= Suzannah Linton =

Suzannah Linton is an academic and practising international lawyer. She has been an academic and researcher at the China University of Political Science and Law, the International Academy of the Red Cross and Red Crescent at Suzhou University, Renmin University of China, and served as distinguished professor at Zhejiang Gongshang University's Law School. She was previously a professor and Chair of International Law at Bangor Law School, Bangor University in Wales.

== Practical experience ==
Linton has wide practical work experience with international courts and tribunals and international organisations, including the UN ICTY, OSCE Mission to Bosnia-Herzegovina, the Office of the UN High Commissioner for Human Rights, and the UN Special Panels for Serious Crimes in East Timor. She has worked especially intensively in the Balkans, Cambodia, Indonesia, East Timor and Bangladesh. She monitored crimes against humanity trials in Indonesia in 2002.

Her work has been profiled by the International Committee of the Red Cross, Radio Television Hong Kong, Professor Philip Zimbardo, and by the Crimes of War project. She has been interviewed about her work by the media in several countries, for example about the Western Sahara, East Timor, justice in Bangladesh and war crimes trials in Hong Kong.

== Academic career ==
Linton has taught and researched at several Chinese universities, and she was awarded a ‘Thousand Talents Award’ and a West Lake Friendship Award. Linton was also a professor and chair of international law at Bangor Law School, Bangor University. Prior to that, she was an associate professor of law at the University of Hong Kong and led its Human Rights LLM Programme. She was a British Chevening Scholar.

Linton teaches public international law and specialised options such as international criminal law, the international law of armed conflict, international human rights law, and dealing with the legacies of the past. She has been a visiting professor at universities in several countries.

Linton was awarded a Hong Kong Research Grants Council grant which led to the identification of case files at the UK National Archives in relation to Hong Kong's War Crimes Trials after the Second World War. With her research team, she also did interviews with survivors and participants of the trials and created the online Hong Kong War Crimes Trials Collection, accessible globally at http://hkwctc.lib.hku.hk/exhibits/show/hkwctc/home. Apart from publishing journal papers related to the subject, for example, Rediscovering the War Crimes Trials in Hong Kong, 1946-48 in the Melbourne Journal of International Law, she also published Hong Kong's War Crimes Trials, published by Oxford University Press in September 2013. The South China Morning Post wrote a major article on this in 2013. She has also spoken around the world about her work in the UK, Hong Kong, China and Australia

Her academic work has been extensively published, appearing in major publications such as the Journal of International Criminal Justice, Leiden Journal of International Law, Singapore Yearbook of International Law, Melbourne Journal of International Law, Melbourne University Law Review, Criminal Law Forum, International Review of the Red Cross, Human Rights Quarterly, and many others. Among other selected works includes editing the Criminal Law Forum's Special Edition on the international crimes proceedings in Bangladesh, and leading with others the project on General Principles and Rules of International Criminal Procedure, published as a book by Oxford University Press in 2013.

Along with Professor Tim McCormack of Melbourne University and Professor Sandesh Sivakumaran of Cambridge University, she led the project on Asia-Pacific Perspectives on International Humanitarian Law published by Cambridge University Press in 2019.
