= Jalladkhana Killing field =

Mass grave in Dhaka, Bangladesh

Coordinates: 23.8111°N 90.3752°E

Jalladkhana Killing Field (Bengali: জল্লাদখানা বধ্যভূমি), is a mass grave site in Mirpur, Dhaka used in the 1971 Bangladesh genocide by Pakistan Army and its local collaborators during the Bangladesh Liberation war.

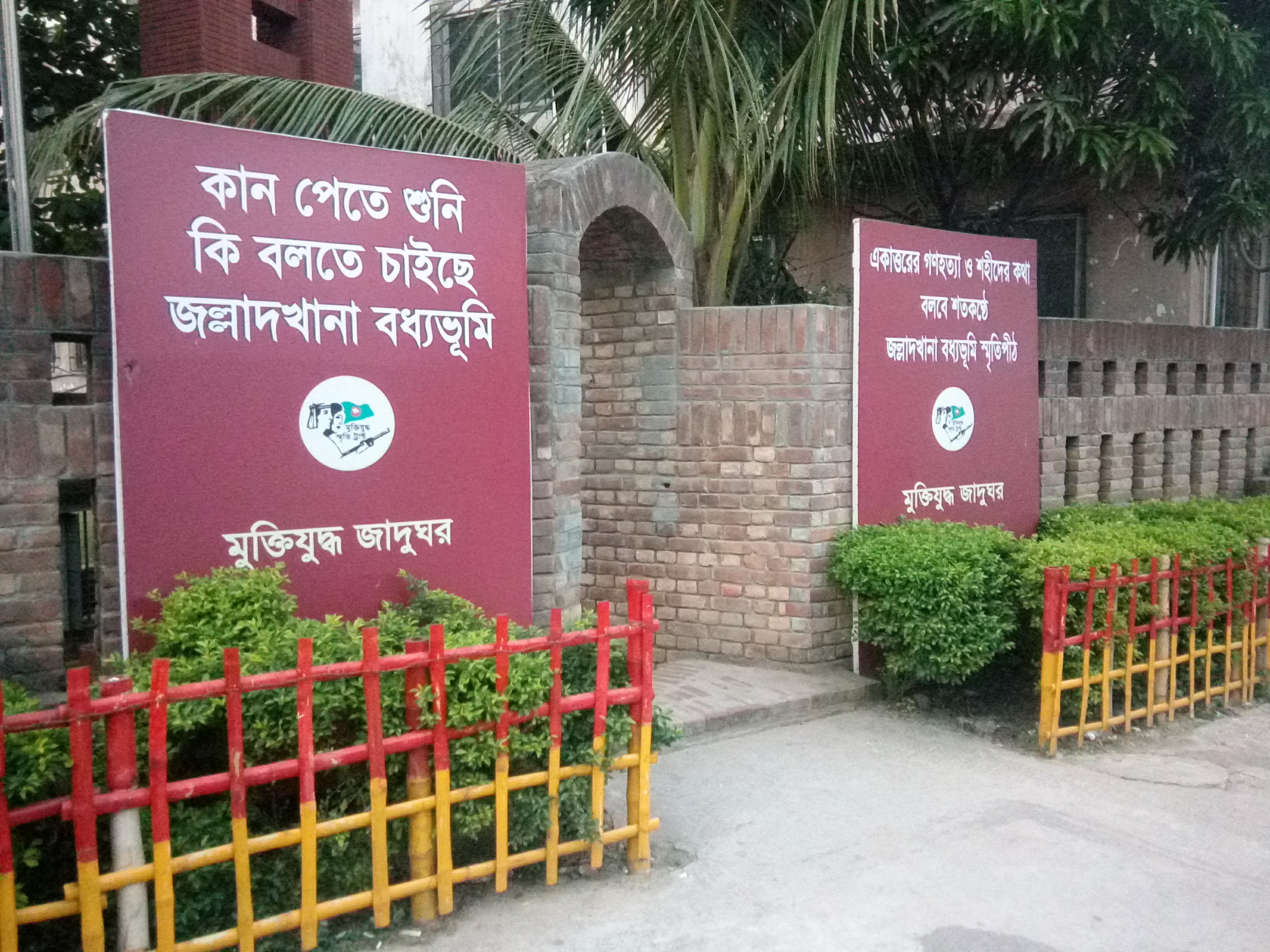
Front side of Jalladkhana Killing field

== Events ==
On March 25, 1971, Pakistan Army launched Operation searchlight to curb the Bengali nationalist movement in former East Pakistan. The army was aided by members of local Islamist groups and non-Bengali ethnic communities in the persecution of Bengali people. Jalladkhana was an abandoned pump house in Mirpur, Dhaka that was used as one of the killing fields. After being detained in various parts of the city, the victims were brought to this site, beheaded and thrown into a water well and several pits dug out for mass graves.

In 1999, an excavation in the site unearthed 70 skulls and 5,392 bone fragments belonging to people of both genders and various ages, as well as fragments of clothes and ornaments belonging to the victims.

In 2013, Abdul Quader Molla, a leader of Bangladesh Jamaat-e-Islami, was convicted of the execution of Khandakar Abu Taleb at Jalladkhana in 1971 among five other charges of crimes against humanity, and was given the capital punishment.

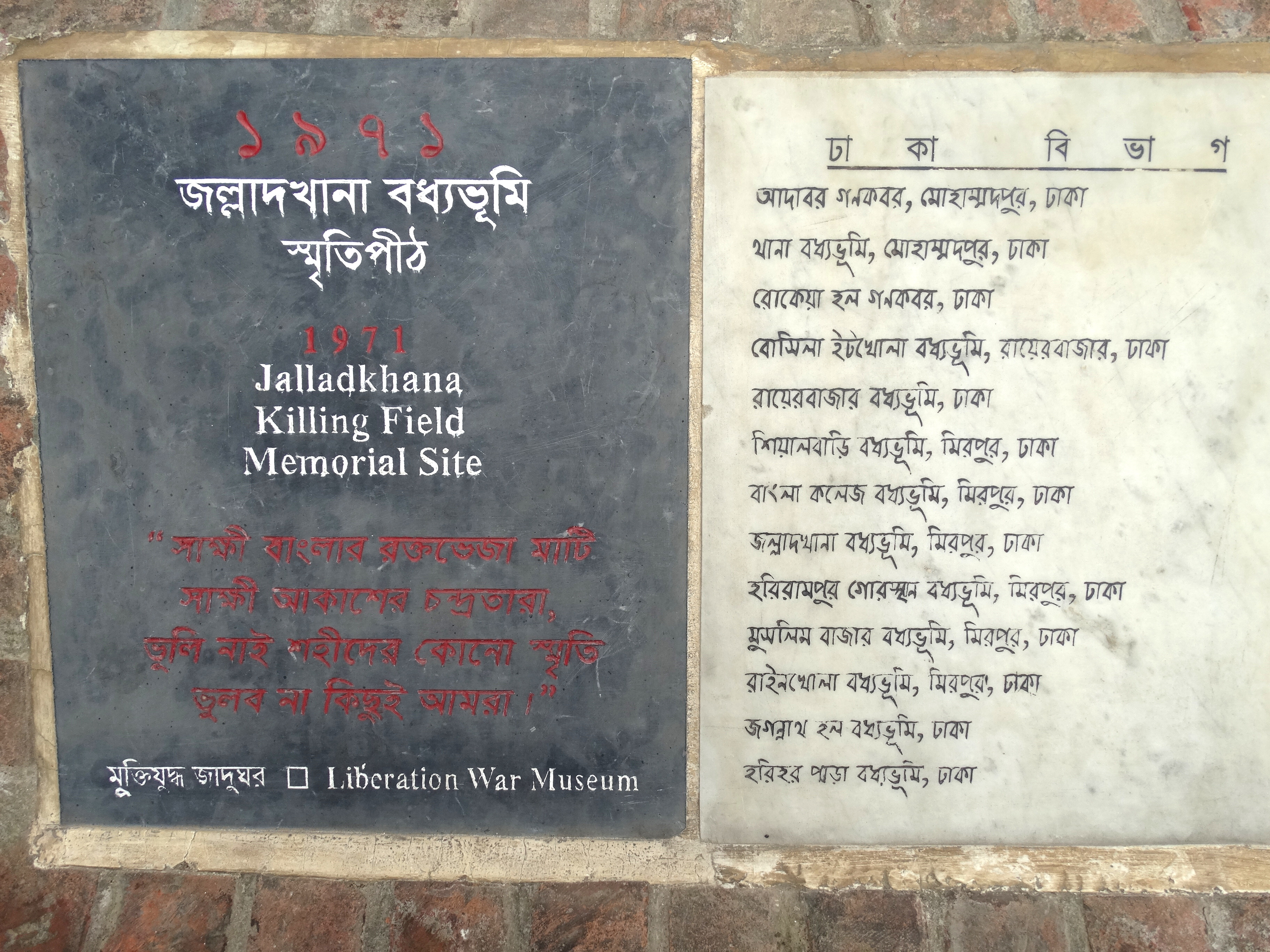
Plaque at Jalladkhana Killing Field Memorial Site

== Public memorial ==
Liberation War Museum, Bangladesh established a memorial and public exhibition on the site, which was opened to the public on 21 June 2007.

== See also ==
- International Crimes Tribunal, Bangladesh
