= Abdul Quader Mollah =

Bangladeshi politician and war criminal (1948–2013)

- আব্দুল কাদের মোল্লা
- Born: 14 August 1948; Faridpur, East Pakistan
- Died: 12 December 2013 (aged 65); Old Dhaka Central Jail, Dhaka, Bangladesh
- Cause of death: Execution by hanging
- Resting place: Faridpur Sadar, Bangladesh
- Education: University of Dhaka
- Occupations: Politician, Spiritual Leader
- Organization: Bangladesh Jamaat-e-Islami
- Known for: Islamist politics
- Spouse: Sanowara Jahan Peyari
- Status: Executed
- Convictions: War crimes Crimes against humanity
- Trial: International Crimes Tribunal (Bangladesh)
- Penalty: Death

Abdul Quader Mollah (Note: Bengali: আব্দুল কাদের মোল্লা) (14 August 1948 – 12 December 2013) was a Bangladeshi Islamist, war criminal, and politician of the Bangladesh Jamaat-e-Islami (BJI), who was sentenced to death by hanging in accordance with the International Crimes Tribunal (ICT) set up by the government of Bangladesh.

Quader Mollah was convicted on five of six counts of crimes against humanity and war crimes at his trial on 5 February 2013. A member of the Al-Badr militia during the Bangladesh War of Independence and Bangladesh genocide, he was convicted of killing 344 civilians among many other war crimes, and was sentenced to life in prison. This led to the 2013 Shahbag protests which demanded capital punishment for all convicted war criminals and the disbandment of Jamaat-e-Islami. Jamaat-e-Islami started a large counter-protest in the country, demanding the release of its convicted and accused leaders.

On 17 September 2013, after an amendment to the ICT law allowing the government, complainant, or informant to appeal an order of acquittal or order of sentencing, the Bangladesh Supreme Court ruled Quader Mollah guilty of murders and other war crimes, and converted his life sentence to a death sentence. He was scheduled to be executed by hanging on 11 December. Due to more legal challenges, the execution was suspended and then upheld; he was executed on 12 December. He was the first person that was executed for war crimes and human rights violations that were committed during the Bangladesh War of Independence.

Quader Mollah had unsuccessfully stood for parliament in 1986 and 1996, contesting the seat Faridpur-4 for Bangladesh Jamaat-e-Islami.

== Early life ==
Abdul Quader Mollah was born in the village of Amirabad, Faridpur, in 1948. He attended school at Amirabad Fazlul Huq Institute. He passed the H.S.C examination in 1966 and did BSc in 1968 from Rajendra College. While studying, he was elected president of the Shahidullah Hall unit of the student wing of Bangladesh Jamaat-e-Islami, the East Pakistan Islami Chhatra Sangha. Quader Mollah worked as a senior teacher at Rifles Public School and College (now Bir Shreshtha Noor Mohammad Public College). He later became the acting principal of the institute for a short period during the government of Ziaur Rahman. He was elected as the vice president of Dhaka Journalists' Union for two consecutive terms in 1982 and 1983. Quader Mollah was married to Sanowara Jahan Peyari.

== Political career ==
In 1971, Jamaat leaders opposed the independence movement which hoped for an independent Bangladesh. As a member of East Pakistan Islami Chhatra Sangha, Quader Mollah joined a paramilitary force, Al-Badr, during the Bangladesh War of Independence. He was known as the Butcher of Mirpur during the war. Bangladesh achieved independence that year and eventually Jamaat and all Islamist and religion-based parties were banned from political participation under the new government.

After the assassination of President Sheikh Mujibur Rahman in 1975 and military coups, the new government permitted Jamaat to participate in politics again. Quader Mollah became active in the party. By 2010, he was assistant secretary general of the party. He was expelled from the Bangladesh National Press Club in 2013. In 1996, prior to the controversial February elections, he was arrested along with Awami League leader Tofael Ahmed under the Special Powers Act, 1974.

As the verdict of a ruling asked by Bangladesh Supreme Court, the registration of the Jamaat-e-Islami was cancelled on 1 August 2013.

== War crimes trial ==
In the 21st century, the government of Bangladesh established an International Crimes Tribunal to prosecute war crimes that were committed in 1971 during the independence war. A formal charge was filed by the Prosecution against Quader Mollah on 18 December 2011 in the form of a petition, as required under Section 9(1) of the 1973 Act. He was charged with collaborating with the Pakistan army and actively participating in the Bangladesh genocide: rape (including the rape of minors) and mass murder of Bangladeshis in the Mirpur area of Dhaka during the 1971 war. As a member of the pro-Pakistan militias during the war, Quader Mollah took part in killing 344 civilians.

=== Charges ===
Charges filed against Quader Mollah by ICT were:

- Charge 1: At Quader Mollah's instruction, one of his aides named Akhter killed Pallab, a student of Bangla College and an organiser of the Liberation War, on 5 April 1971. Pallab was buried by the side of Kalapani Jheel along with several other bodies. Pallab was taken to an Eidgah at Mirpur-12, where he was shot to death.
- Charge 2: On 27 March 1971, Quader Mollah's aides murdered pro-liberation poet Meherun Nesa, her mother, and two brothers at their house at Mirpur-6.
- Charge 3: On 29 March 1971, Quader Mollah, along with collaborators from Al Badr and the Razakars, detained Khandakar Abu Taleb from Mirpur 10 bus stand and tied him up with a rope. He was brought to the Mirpur Jallad Khana Pump House and killed.
- Charge 4: On 25 November 1971, Quader Mollah, with some 70 accomplices, went to the village of Khanbari and Ghotan Char, now Shaheed Nagar of Keraniganj, and abducted two unarmed fighters from the house of Mozaffar Ahmed Khan. Freedom fighters Osman Gani and Golam Mostafa were brutally murdered by charging bayonet.
- Charge 5: Attack and indiscriminate shooting by Quader Mollah and his gang killed hundreds of unarmed people of the two villages. Among them, 24 persons were named in the charge. On the early morning of 24 April, members of Pakistan occupation forces and around 50 collaborators in the presence of Quader Mollah raided the village of Alubdi in Mirpur and attacked unarmed villagers, killing 344 people.
- Charge 6: On 26 March 1971 in the evening, some collaborators and Pakistani soldiers led by Quader Mollah killed Hazrat Ali and five members of his family at Mirpur. Entering his house, the soldiers shot dead Hazrat and killed his wife Amina and daughters Khadija and Tahmina. That day they also killed his only son, two-year-old Babu, by bashing the baby against the ground.

=== Verdict ===
On 5 February 2013, Quader Mollah was convicted of five of the six charges, and acquitted on one charge as it was determined it had not been proved by the prosecution. He was sentenced to life in prison and an additional 15 years for three of the charges in addition to the time he had been imprisoned since his arrest. The one remaining charge was dismissed after it was determined the prosecution had not proved it.

When the court gave him a life sentence instead of the death penalty, which many had expected, a smiling Quader Mollah celebrated the verdict by holding up two fingers in a "V" sign as he left the court.

=== Reaction after verdict ===
Many activists reacted by protesting and demonstrating, demanding the death penalty and an end to extremism in politics. A major protest started at the Shahbag intersection in central Dhaka. Bloggers and online activists called for further mass demonstration at Shahbag intersection. Thousands of people joined the protest and the demonstration culminated in the 2013 Shahbag protests.

During the protests, hundreds of thousands of people held day-and-night vigils at Shahbag, refusing to leave until all those convicted of war crimes were sentenced to death. A counter-protest against the trials and general strike was launched by Jamaat-e-Islami, as most of the accused were Jamaat leaders.

The Bangladesh Nationalist Party (BNP) had also initially expressed support for Jamaat-e-Islami, a principal ally in their Four-Party Alliance in the 2000s. The BNP has commented on the Shahbag Protest, warning that the government should not be allowed to draw political mileage from the movement that demanded capital punishment for convicted war criminals.

Responding to the demand of the Shahbag activists, on 13 February 2013, the National Press Club of Bangladesh stripped Quader Mollah of his membership. On 17 February 2013, the Bangladeshi Parliament passed a bill amending the International Crimes (Tribunal) Act of 1973 which allowed the government, complainant, or informant to appeal an order of acquittal or order of sentencing.

Jamaat members led protests against the trials, saying that the government was trying to suppress the opposition. It called for a general strike in Dhaka, shutting down activity in the city.

=== Controversies ===
In December 2012, conversations and emails between the chief judge of the ICT, Nizamul Huq, and a Brussels-based lawyer were published in The Economist, which revealed that the Bangladesh Government had pressured the ICT for a quick verdict. Following the revelations, Justice Nizamul Huq resigned from the tribunal. The European Union, the UK, Turkey and Australia expressed their concern as they believed the death penalty violated human rights. Two UN Human Rights Commission experts called for a halt to the execution due to concerns that Quader Mollah did not receive a fair trial. "The right of appeal is of particular importance in death penalty cases", said the Special Rapporteur (UN) on the independence of judges and lawyers, Gabriela Knaul. Christof Heyns, Special Rapporteur (UN) on summary executions, said capital punishment "may be imposed only following a trial that complied with fair trial and due process safeguards. Only full respect for stringent due process guarantees distinguishes capital punishment as possibly permitted under international law from a summary execution, which by definition violates human rights standards." The International Commission of Jurists (ICJ) said the retrospective application of the amendment in Quader Mollah's case was incompatible with Bangladesh's obligations under the International Covenant on Civil and Political Rights (ICCPR), including Article 15, which prohibits the imposition of a heavier penalty than provided for at the time the criminal offence was committed. Baroness Warsi stated, "We further note that Abdul Quader Mollah was sentenced to death following an appeal permitted under retrospectively applied legislation, and that he was not permitted to review his sentence before the Supreme Court". Human Rights Watch said that the death sentence of Quader Mollah violated fair trial standards, stating "Changing the law and applying it retroactively after a trial offends basic notions of a fair trial under international law."

=== Death sentence and execution ===
After the government had amended the war crimes law to allow a sentence to be appealed based on leniency of punishment, prosecutors appealed to the Supreme Court of Bangladesh and asked for it to upgrade Quader Mollah's sentence from life in prison to death. On 17 September 2013, the Supreme Court accepted the appeal and sentenced Quader Mollah to death. He was not given a right to appeal, as the war crimes law under which he was prosecuted did not have a provision granting that right. Quader Mollah was one of five leaders of the largest Islamic Party, Jamaat-e-Islami and condemned to death by Bangladesh's International Crimes Tribunal. He was scheduled to be executed by hanging on 11 December 2013 at 0:01. On 8 December, the International Crimes Tribunal issued an execution warrant and delivered it to the relevant authorities. The prison chief said that all preparations had been made and that Quader Mollah's family had been asked to meet him prior to the execution. Quader Mollah refused to request a presidential pardon though the authorities reportedly approached him three times on the matter.

Quader Mollah's lawyers asked the Supreme Court to halt the execution and allow him to appeal, as Bangladesh's constitution grants all death row prisoners the right of appeal. Supreme Court chamber judge Syed Mahmoud Hossain accepted these arguments issued a stay of execution order to give Mollah time to appeal on 11 December 2013, just 90 minutes before he was scheduled to be executed. Following two hours of hearings, Chief Justice Muzammel Hossain adjourned the hearing until the next day. Amongst the defence's arguments was that the state was proceeding with preparations for the execution without completing all necessary legal procedures.

The appellate division of Bangladesh Supreme Court, which raised Quader Mollah's life sentence to a death penalty, rejected his petition to review the ruling. Attorney General Mahbubey Alam said that the government would decide on a new execution date as "there are no more barriers to execute Quader Molla. There is no chance of any confusion." His lawyer, Khandaker Mahbub Hossain, added that "my client has been deprived of fair justice, but since the highest court has made the decision, we have nothing more to say."

Quader Mollah was hanged in Dhaka Central Jail on 12 December 2013 at 22:01. The Bangladesh Jamaat-e-Islami called it a "political killing". More significantly, a segment of Bangladeshi people and some human rights observant in Bangladesh and abroad, they do, believe the hanged of Quader Mollah was not only a "political killing" but also a "judicial killing." He was later buried in his village of Faridpur.

== Domestic reaction ==
Shahbag protesters, who started rallying from 5 February 2013 for the capital punishment of Quader Mollah, expressed their delight after the execution. Following the execution of Quader Mollah, Bangladesh Jamaat-e-Islami began counter-protests and called for a general strike on 11, 12 and 15 December 2013. At least 25 people were killed and many other injured in different parts of the country during the protests. During the protests, Islamist activists torched homes and businesses of government supporters and firebombed train stations and blocked roads. The party called the execution "political murder" and warned of exacting revenge for "every drop" of his blood. Two Awami League activists were hacked to death in Kalaroa; one other person died in clashes between police and JEI supporters in Noakhali, while a driver was reportedly killed after JEI protesters chased him down. As a result of the violent reaction, and in combination with violence in the lead up to the 2014 Bangladeshi general election, Prime Minister Sheikh Hasina vowed to crack down on the violence. The rioting, and the preceding opposition blockade, caused economic losses, with fear of escalating protests, prior to the election.

== International reaction ==
The international media did not cover the execution except with brief agency reports. Very few governments reacted to the hanging. China, the world's most active user of the death penalty, did not issue official statements at any level. India, Bangladesh's neighbour and number one trading partner, did not issue any official reaction. Protests against his execution were held in London and Pakistan.

The United Nations High Commissioner for Human Rights, Navi Pillay, sent a letter to then-Prime Minister Sheikh Hasina, urging her to stay the execution of Quader Molla. Additionally, two independent experts from the UN Human Rights Council called on the Bangladesh government to halt the execution.

Amnesty International's Bangladesh researcher, Abbas Faiz, said, "We are concerned about the Supreme Court's verdict and government's apparent relentless efforts to ensure the hanging of Quader Molla. We urge the government to commute his death sentence. We also call for the abolition of the death penalty."

=== Official reactions ===
- Qatar – The state of Qatar condemned the execution and stated that it was concerned that Mollah's execution would exacerbate tensions.
- Pakistan - The National Assembly of the Islamic Republic of Pakistan passed a resolution vote to condemn the hanging of Abdul Quader Mollah. Interior Minister Chaudhry Nisar Ali Khan described the punishment of Bangladesh Jamaat-e-Islami leader as "judicial murder".

=== Reaction from other groups ===
- Muslim Council of Britain – "It is a sad day for Bangladesh and sad day for democracy and justice. The trial process of Abdul Quader Mollah was fraught with flaws and the international community including the UN and all respected Human Rights organisations world over strongly criticised the trial as unfair, biased and politically driven."
- Islamic Circle of North America – "This is a political murder and a dark day for justice."

== See also ==
- List of Bangladeshi criminals
