= West Nakhalpara =

- Urban area of Dhaka City
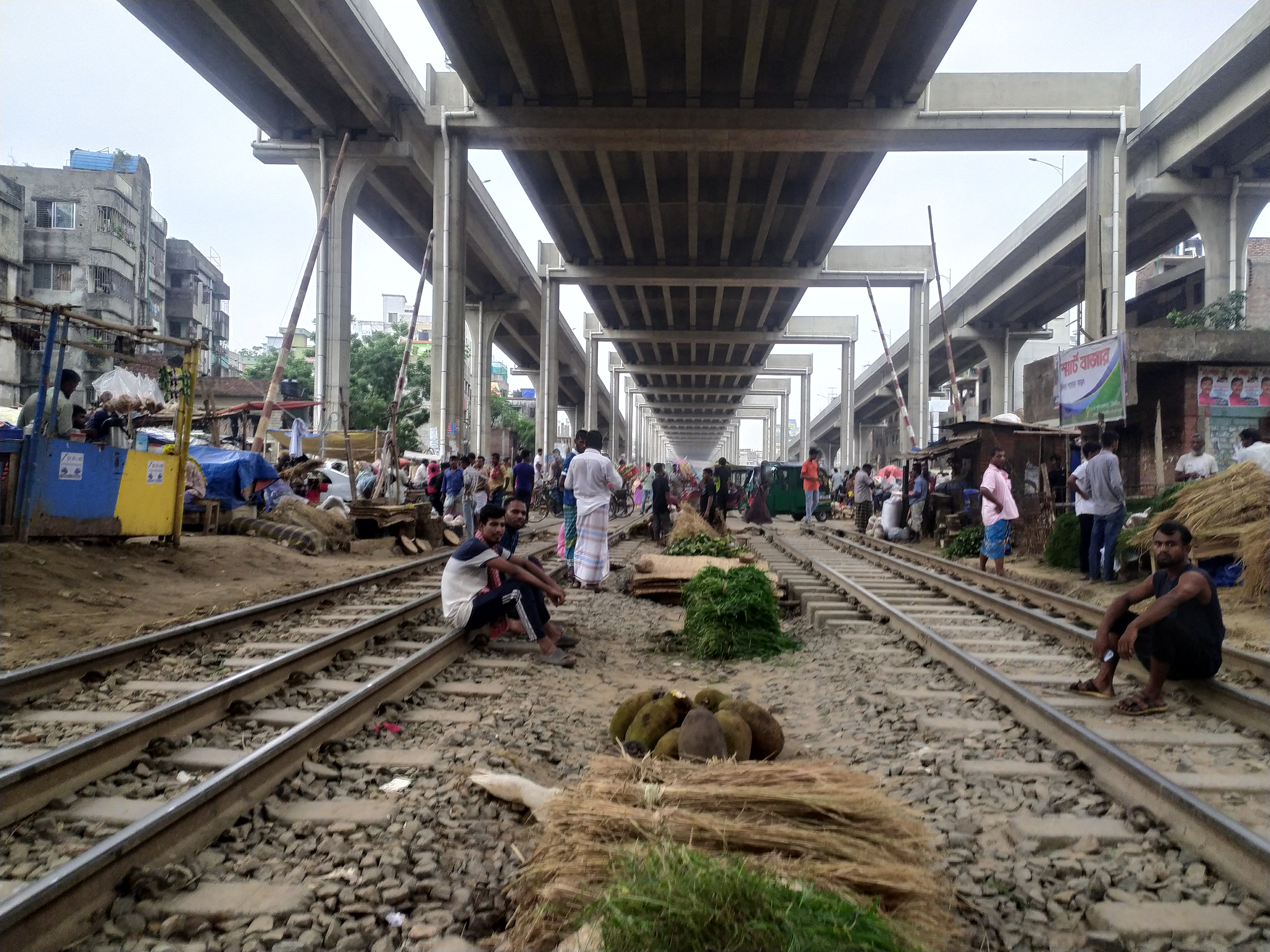
- Nakhalpara Rail-Gate.

- Location in Bangladesh
- Coordinates: 23°46′07″N 90°23′41″E
- Country: Bangladesh
- Division: Dhaka
- District: Dhaka
- Local government: Tejgaon Thana & Tejgaon Industrial Area Thana
- Thana: Tejgaon
- Time zone: UTC+6 (BST)
- Poster Code: 1215

West Nakhalpara (Bengali: পশ্চিম নাখালপাড়া) is an area in Tejgaon.

Important areas of West Nakhalpara 1. Prime Minister's Office (Bangladesh) 2. Nakhalpara MP Hostel.

3. SSF officer's quarter. 4. Shia Mosque & Graveyard complex. 5. Rahimafrooz Battery Headquarter. 6. Loacus More. 7. Banker's Row. 8. Alenberi Row. 9. Nakhalpara Sub Post Office. 10.Nakhalpara Rail-Gate 11. Badam Gach Tola (Drum Factory)

== Mosques in West Nakhalpara ==
1.Nakhalpara Baitul Atiq Jame Mosjid.
2.Nakhalpara Baro Jame Mosjid.
3.Nakhalpara Hazrat(RA) Mosjid & Madrasha Complex
4.Nakhalpara Baitul M'amur Jame Mosjid.

== Schools in West Nakhalpara ==
1.Nakhalpara Government Primary School 2.Nakhalpara Hossain Ali High School 3.Samin Little Primary School Its coordinates are 23°46′07″N 90°23′41″E
