= Capital punishment in Bangladesh =

In Bangladesh, capital punishment is legal but only applicable to individuals over 18. Crimes currently punishable by death are set out in the Penal Code of Bangladesh. These include waging war against the state, abetting mutiny, giving false evidence upon which an innocent person suffers death, murder, assisted suicide of a child, and murder of a child. The Code of Criminal Procedure 1898 (created in British India) provides that a person given the death penalty "be hanged by the neck until he is dead." For murder cases, the Appellate Division requires trial courts to weigh aggravating and mitigating factors to determine whether the death penalty is warranted.

The Constitution of Bangladesh does not anywhere expressly recognise international human rights law, although some articles recognise international human rights. Article 25 of the Constitution recognises the United Nations Charter. Article 47 recognises international humanitarian law and provides that the Constitution will not limit the application of international treaties and the law of war.

The Women and Children Repression Prevention Act 2000 provides that the death penalty can be imposed for murder or attempted murder involving burning, poison, or acid. Causing grievous bodily harm occurs, by burning, poison, or acid, if the victim's eyesight, hearing, face, breasts, or reproductive organs are damaged. Therefore, criminals in Bangladesh can be sentenced to death for attempted crimes and causing grievous bodily harm.

A number of offences (crimes not resulting in death) are punishable by death when committed by armed forces personnel. These offences include: providing aid to the enemy, cowardice, and desertion, and inducement to such and cowardly use of a flag of truce or any act calculated to imperil Bangladesh.

According to the World Coalition Against the Death Penalty, Bangladesh carried out six executions in 2017. JusticeMakers Bangladesh in France called for Bangladesh to abolish the death penalty on the 2024 World Day Against the Death Penalty, shortly after prime minister Sheikh Hasina resigned from office. On 17 November 2025, the ICT sentenced former prime minister Sheikh Hasina to death, charging her with authorizing the use of lethal force that resulted in the death of 1,400 protesters during the July Mass Uprising of 2024.

== International human rights law ==
Bangladesh was originally a part of Pakistan (which in turn was a part of British India) and was created as a consequence of human rights abuses. When the Awami League won Pakistan's first election in 1970, the Pakistani Army brutally suppressed the Bengali people in East Pakistan. More than three million people were left dead, millions of women were raped, and tens of millions of people were forced into extremely dirty and unpleasant refugee camps in India. After India briefly invaded, Bangladesh was free from the brutality of Pakistani rule but faced the difficult task of rebuilding a country that was already desperately poor and prone to natural disasters. To this day, Amnesty International believes Bangladesh is still wracked with human rights violations.

The People's Republic of Bangladesh has ratified some International Human Rights Treaties. However, the government has registered some declarations and reservations to particular articles of certain treaties. One reservation of particular importance is the reservation to Article 14 paragraph 1 of the Convention Against Torture (CAT). The reservation grounds were that Bangladesh would apply it "in consonance with the existing laws and legislation of the country."

Bangladesh has not yet ratified or acceded to several International Human Rights Treaties. The International Covenant on Civil and Political Rights: 1976 was ratified in 2000. However, the Optional Protocol to the International Covenant on Economic, Social and Cultural Rights (ICESCR) and the Optional Protocol to the International Covenant on Civil and Political Rights (ICCPR) have not yet been ratified. The Second Protocol to the International Covenant on Civil and Political Rights, aiming at the abolition of the death penalty: 1991 has also not yet been ratified.

The Human Rights Council under the Universal Periodic Review reviewed Bangladesh in 2009. A strong recommendation was made for the abolition of the death penalty. The Bangladesh government in response to this said: "The death penalty is maintained in Bangladesh only as an exemplary punishment for heinous crimes such as throwing of acid, acts of terrorism, planned murder, trafficking of drugs, rape, abduction of women and children. Both the judiciary and administration deal with these cases of capital punishment with extreme caution and compassion and such punishment is extended only in ultimate cases that relate to the gross violation of human rights of the victims. Bangladesh has an extremely low rate of implementation of such death penalties."

The fact that a very wide range of crimes are punishable by killing potentially conflicts with Bangladesh's International Laws. Allowing the death penalty for crimes such as kidnapping or drug trafficking is contrary to the ICCPR's mandate which states that the death penalty should only be applied in the most serious of cases.

== Mandatory death sentences ==
The Women and Children Repression Prevention Act 2000 provides that the punishment required for a person who causes death for dowry is a mandatory death sentence. This therefore means there is no other alternative punishment available and the jury is deprived of the ability to apply discretion to certain circumstances relating to the crime or the accused.

=== State v Shukar Ali ===
This case is an example of the potentially unjust outcomes that can result from mandatory death sentences. On 12 July 2001, Shukar Ali, a 14-year-old boy, was convicted of sexually assaulting a 7-year-old girl which resulted in her death. At the time, the summer of 1999, Ali lived with his mother and elder sister in the slums of western Bangladesh's Manikganj District. He was not in a financial position to afford legal assistance, so he was appointed a defence lawyer by the State. This was not standard practice; however, in this case, it was necessary because of the severity of the punishment that Ali would face if found guilty. Ali was sentenced by the High Court Division to death by hanging under section 6 of an earlier version of the Women and Children Repressive Prevention Act, 1995. The court held that they were compelled to make this decision regardless of his age. The court held "no alternative punishment has been provided for the offence that the condemned prisoner has been charged and we are left with no other discretion but to maintain the sentence if we believe that the prosecution has been able to prove beyond a reasonable doubt. This is a case, which may be taken as "hard cases make bad laws". On appeal, the Appellate Division commuted Ali's death sentence to life imprisonment "until natural death". This was the first time the Supreme Court of Bangladesh ever overturned a decision. The criminal law in Bangladesh has advanced significantly since Ali was first imprisoned. A law was introduced prohibiting the death penalty and life imprisonment for children. However, children are still held to be criminally responsible at the age of nine.

On 16 May 2010, the High Court Division of the Supreme Court of Bangladesh declared sections 6(2), 6(3), and 6(4) of the Women and Children Repression Prevention (Special Provision) Act, 1995 unconstitutional. The court held that regardless of the offence, legislation may not provide that mandatory death sentences are the only available punishment. The judge held, "A provision of law which deprives the court to use of its beneficent discretion in a matter of life and death, without regard to the circumstances in which the offence was committed and, therefore without regard to the gravity of the offence cannot but be regarded as harsh, unfair and oppressive. The legislature cannot make relevant circumstances irrelevant, and deprive the court of its legitimate jurisdiction to exercise its discretion not to impose death sentence in appropriate cases. Determination of appropriate measures of punishment is judicial and not executive functions [sic]. The court will enunciate the relevant facts to be considered and the weight to be given to them having regard to the situation of the case. Therefore, we have no hesitation in holding the view that these provisions are against the fundamental tenets of our Constitution, and therefore, ultra vires the Constitution and accordingly they are declared void."

== International Crimes Tribunal (Bangladesh) ==
The International Crimes Tribunal (Bangladesh) (ICT of Bangladesh) is a domestic war tribunal in Bangladesh, which was set up to investigate and prosecute suspects for the genocide committed in 1971 by the Pakistan Army during the Bangladesh Liberation War. The first person to be convicted in the Tribunal was Abul Kalam Azad, who had left the country and was not present for his trial. He was sentenced to death in 2013. The United Nations offered its support in 2009 to make sure that similar mistakes made by other crime tribunals were not made in Bangladesh. The head of the United Nations in Bangladesh said "This is the first time Bangladesh is conducting war crimes tribunals and it is important it understands how other countries have held them. There are some countries where mistakes were made and we don't want Bangladesh to repeat those mistakes." However, there has been a shift since the commencement of the trials because there is concern the International Crimes Tribunal are not carrying out their obligations under Bangladesh's international human rights obligations, International Criminal law, and the Bangladesh Constitution. Bangladesh is a state party to the ICCPR, therefore they have an obligation to meet the key provisions. Especially the provisions regarding fair trials and the rights of accused persons.

On 17 November 2025, the ICT sentenced former prime minister Sheikh Hasina to death, charging her with authorizing the use of lethal force that resulted in the death of 1,400 protesters during the July Mass Uprising of 2024.

== Executions carried out per year ==
Year	No.	Charges	Ref.
2025	1	Terrorism	
2024	0	N/A	
2023	5	Rape, Robbery, Murder	
2022	4	Murder	
2021	4	Murder, Terrorism, Rape	
2020	2	Murder	
2019	1	Murder	
2018	0	N/A	
2017	6	Murder, Terrorism	
2016	9	Murder, War Crimes, Terrorism	
2015	4	Murder, War Crimes	
2014	0	N/A	
2013	2	Murder, War Crimes	
2012	0	N/A	
2011	2	Murder	
2010	7	Murder	
2009	3	Murder	
2008	2	Murder	
2007	6	Murder, Terrorism	
2006	2	Murder	
