= Masudur Rahman Khan =

Bangladeshi architect

- মাসুদুর রহমান খান
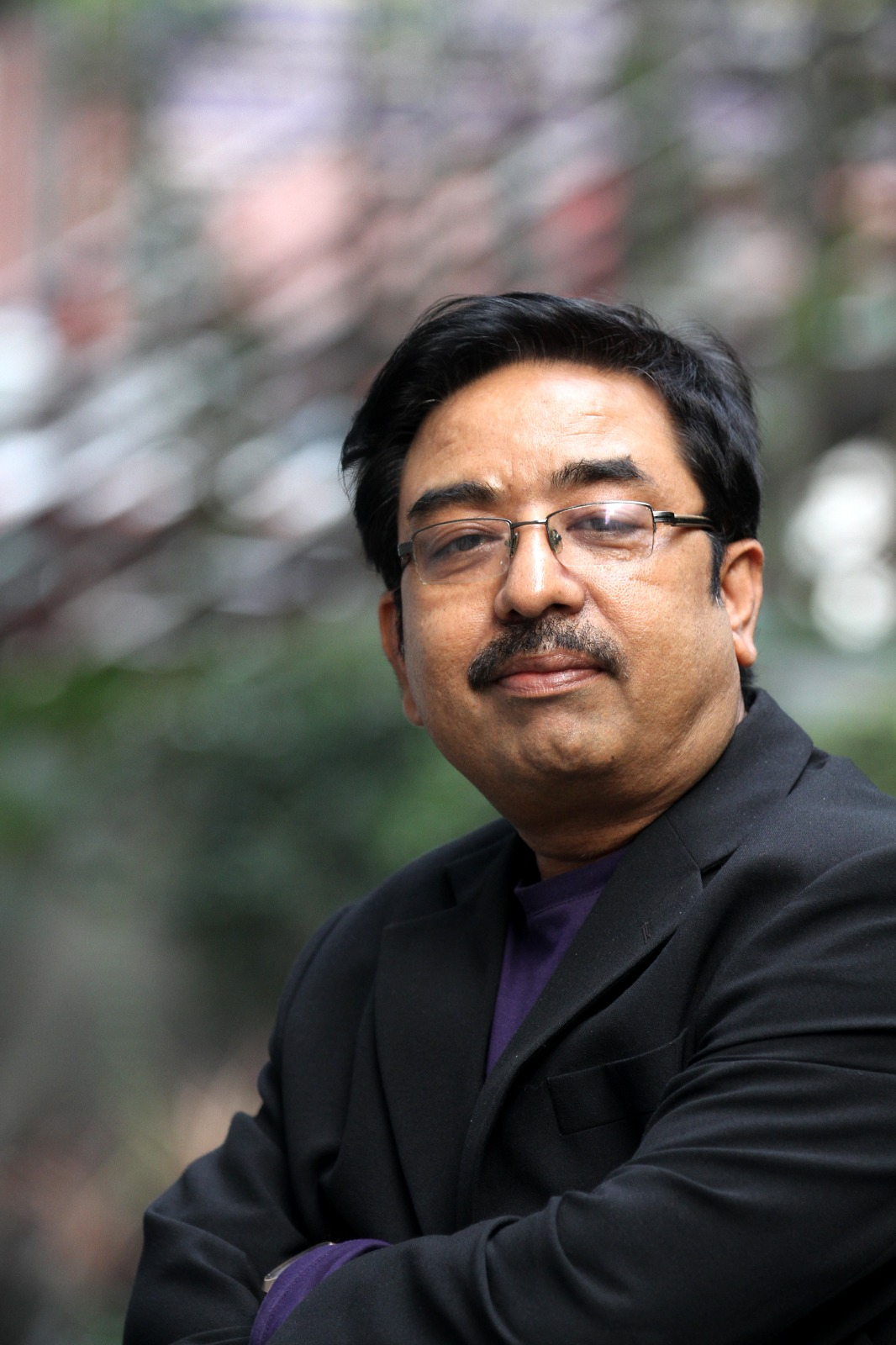
- Masudur Rahman Khan in 2023
- Education: Bangladesh University of Engineering and Technology; Ananda Mohan College; Mymensingh Zilla School
- Occupation: Architect
- Parent(s): Mohiuddin Khan & Begum Khaleda Khanam
- Practice: BASHAT Architects Engineers
- Buildings: Mausoleum of Ziaur Rahman; Sher-e-Bangla National Cricket Stadium; Sylhet International Cricket Stadium; National Stadium, Dhaka; International Mother Language Institute

Masudur Rahman Khan (Bengali: মাসুদুর রহমান খান) is a Bangladeshi architect and Urban Designer. He was the vice president of Institute of Architects Bangladesh. He is the Principal Architect & MD of Bashat Architects Engineers

== Early life and education ==
Masudur Rahman Khan was born in the Mymensingh district. He passed SSC from Mymensingh Zilla School in 1979. He passed HSC from Ananda Mohan College, Mymensingh in 1981 and was admitted to the Department of Architecture in BUET. Masud received his bachelor's degree in architecture from Bangladesh University of Engineering and Technology in 1988.

== Career ==
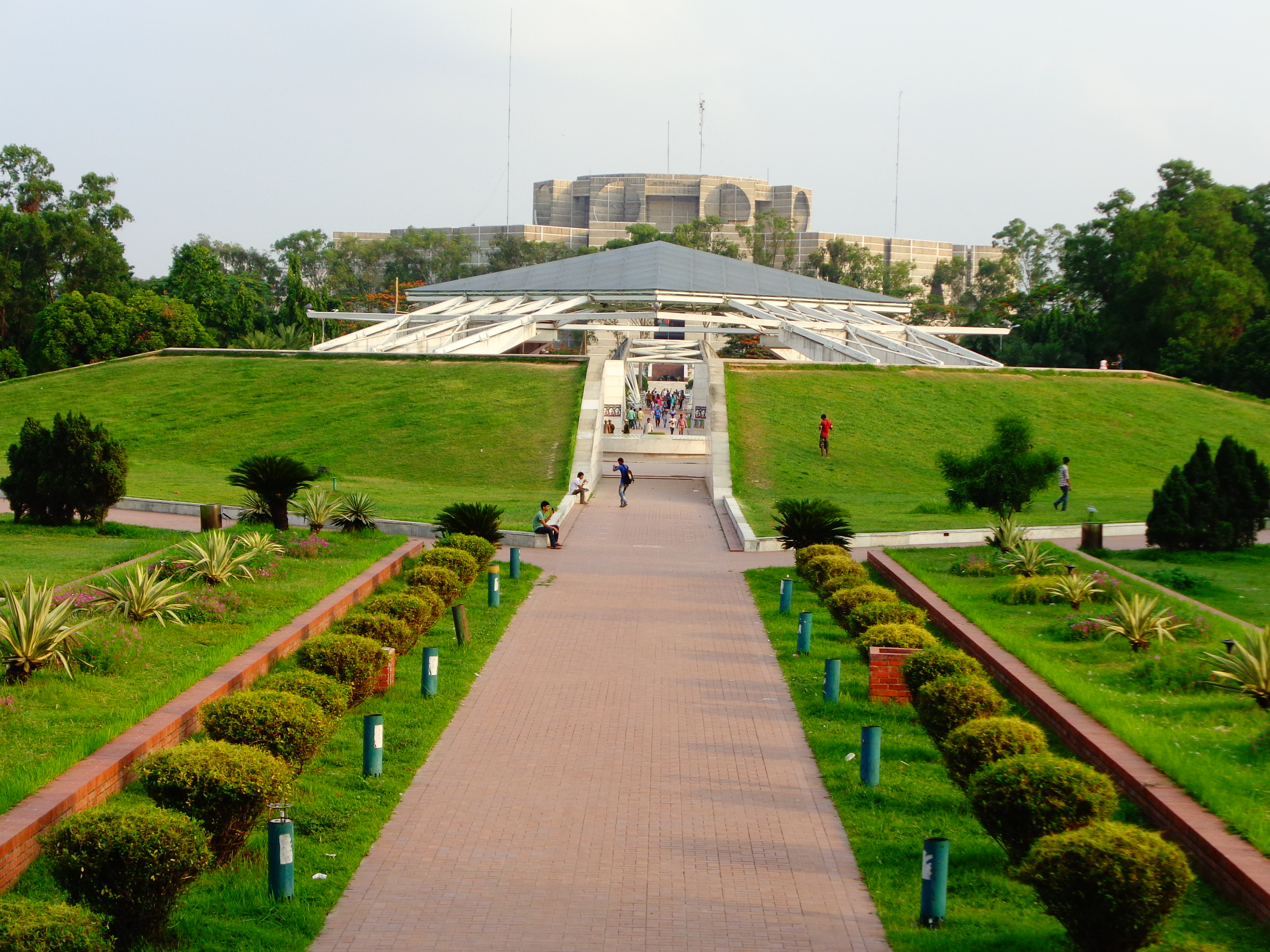
The Zia mausoleum in 2015

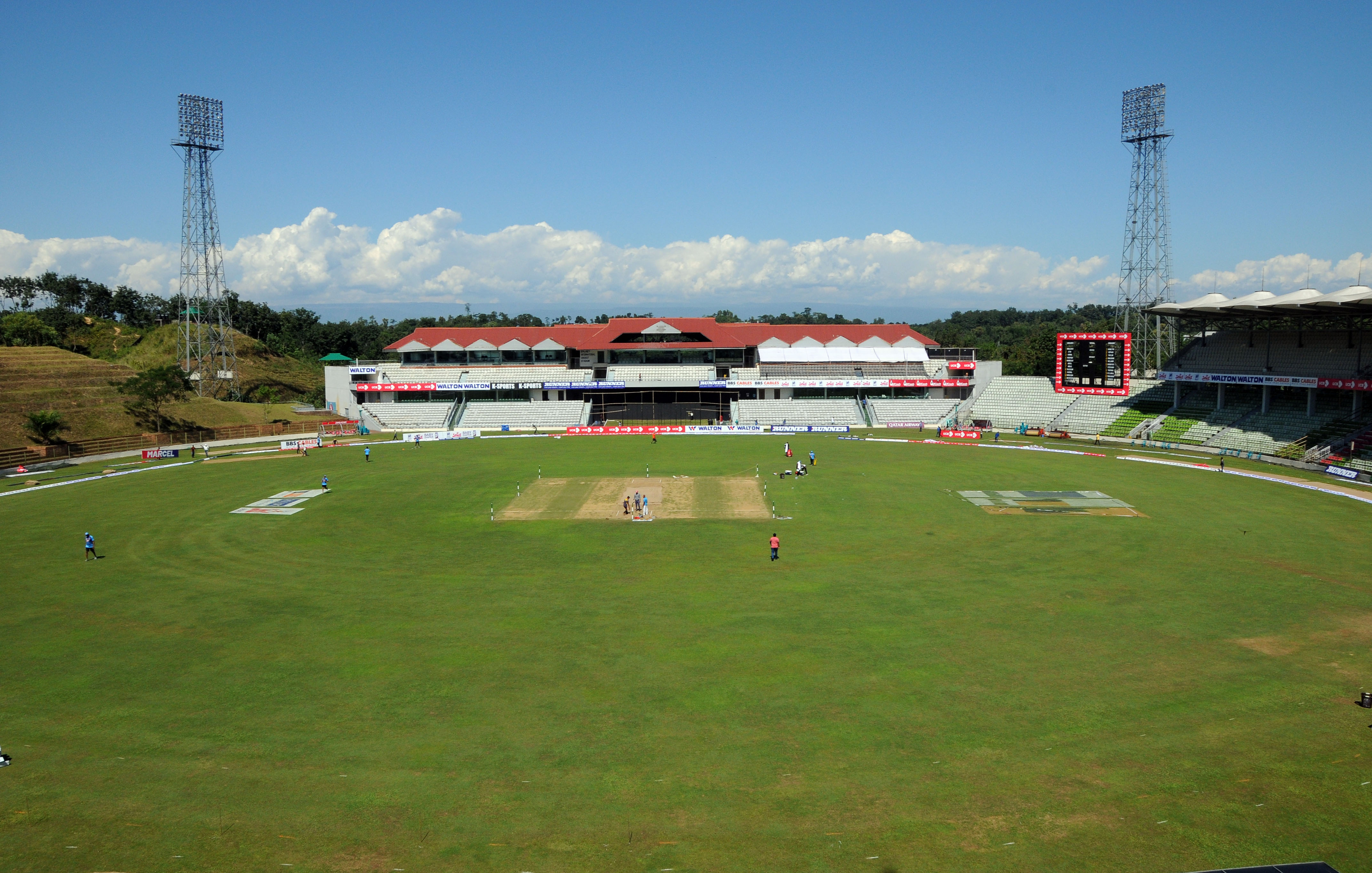
Sylhet International Cricket Stadium, Sylhet

He designed Mausoleum of Ziaur Rahman at Zia Uddan. His notable works include the International Mother Language Institute in Segunbagicha, Bangladesh Computer Council Building, Sher-e-Bangla National Cricket Stadium in Mirpur, Public Health Building in Segunbagicha, Sylhet Cricket Stadium, Master Plan of Payra Power Plant in Patuakhali, and other installations, especially the Payra Rehabilitation Project. Jamalpur District Stadium, Gopalgonj Football Stadium, Women Sports Complex, Swimming Pool and Gymnasium Complex, Chittagong Divisional Swimming Pool, Resort Hotel Sea Heaven in Kuakata, notable works outside the country include Goa Indoor Stadium in Goa, India, Goa Hockey Stadium, Interior design and construction work of Standard Bank in Gulshan, NDE Corporate Building in Banani, Classic Center, East West Industrial Park Limited and numerous installations. He also worked for the renovation and the remodeling of the National Stadium, Dhaka. He was the main architect of Sylhet International Cricket Stadium.

== Personal life ==
He married Nahid Fatima Khan in 1986. His mother Begum Khaleda Khanam passed away on 3rd October, 2026.

He reportedly swears by the quote:

Any good architectural design should have its own green and sustainable quality. It’s a prime consideration for any architectural work.
