= Mausoleum of Ziaur Rahman =

Resting place of the seventh president of Bangladesh

- জিয়াউর রহমানের মাজার
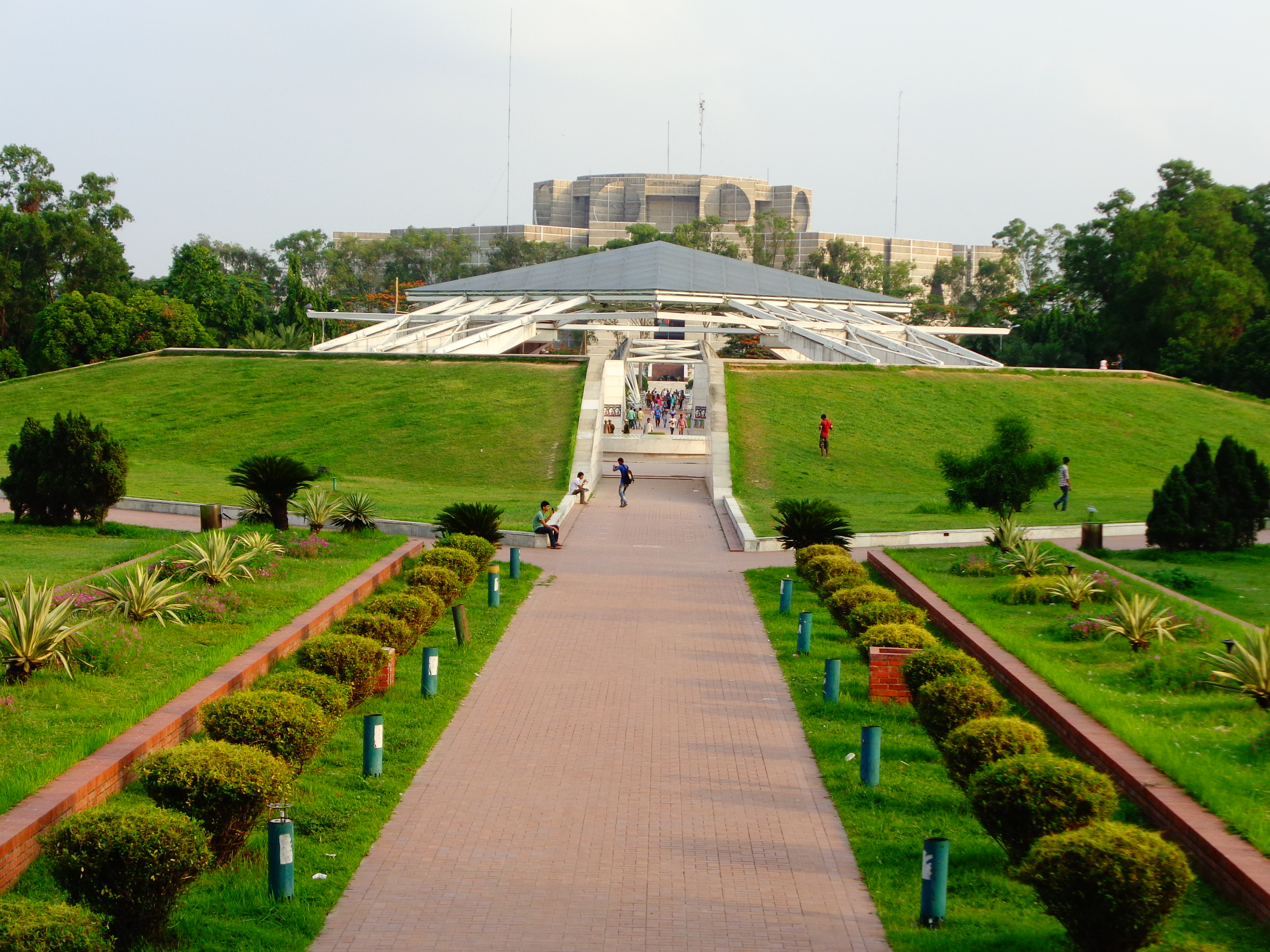
- The mausoleum in 2015
- Interactive map of the Mausoleum of Ziaur Rahman area

General information
- Type: Mausoleum
- Location: Zia Uddan, Sher-e-Bangla Nagar, Dhaka
- Coordinates: 23.7667°N 90.3782°E
- Construction started: 1981
- Inaugurated: 1989
- Client: Government of Bangladesh

Design and construction
- Architect: Masudur Rahman Khan

The Mausoleum Complex of Ziaur Rahman (Bengali: জিয়াউর রহমানের মাজার) is a significant architectural engineering monument located in Sher-e-Bangla Nagar of Dhaka city in Bangladesh. The monument hosts the grave of Ziaur Rahman, president of Bangladesh from 1977 to 1981. Also, the grave of his wife, former Prime Minister of Bangladesh Khaleda Zia, who died in 2025, is right next to his grave.

The monument was constructed by GBB Limited in consultation with Bashat Architects Engineers Ltd and executed under the public works department and department of architecture.

== History ==
The mausoleum of Ziaur Rahman is often known as Zia Uddan. Ziaur Rahman was the president of Bangladesh. He was an army general turned politician. He became president of Bangladesh on 21 April 1977. He was assassinated on 30 May 1981 in Chittagong by Bangladeshi army personnel. Later, his burial was relocated from Chittagong to the parliament area.

In 1991, after the Bangladesh Nationalist Party (BNP) came to power in Bangladesh, it constructed a mausoleum centered on the grave of its founder Rahman and built a bailey bridge over Crescent Lake to provide access to the mausoleum. However, after the Awami League (AL) formed the government in 1996, the bridge was demolished. Later, when the BNP returned to power in 2001, a concrete bridge was constructed over the lake and the mausoleum was transformed into a complex.

In 30 December 2025, Khaleda Zia, wife of Ziaur Rahman and former Bangladeshi prime minister, died due to illness. The BNP decided to bury her at the mausoleum. The next day, on 31 December, she was buried beside her husband's grave following a state funeral.

== Location ==
The mausoleum complex is located in Zia Udyan, which is located to the north of the Jatiya Sangsad Bhaban and to the east of the Ganabhaban, the prime minister's residence.

== Structure ==
The entire structure of the mausoleum complex is 74 acres, which is divided into 7 parts.

=== Mausoleum ===
The center of the complex is the grave of General Ziaur Rahman. The width of this tomb is 30 feet. It consists of black and white marble stone in a circled way. Around the tomb there are four walls with engraved Arabic writings, which hold up the roof (of glass and steel) of the mausoleum.

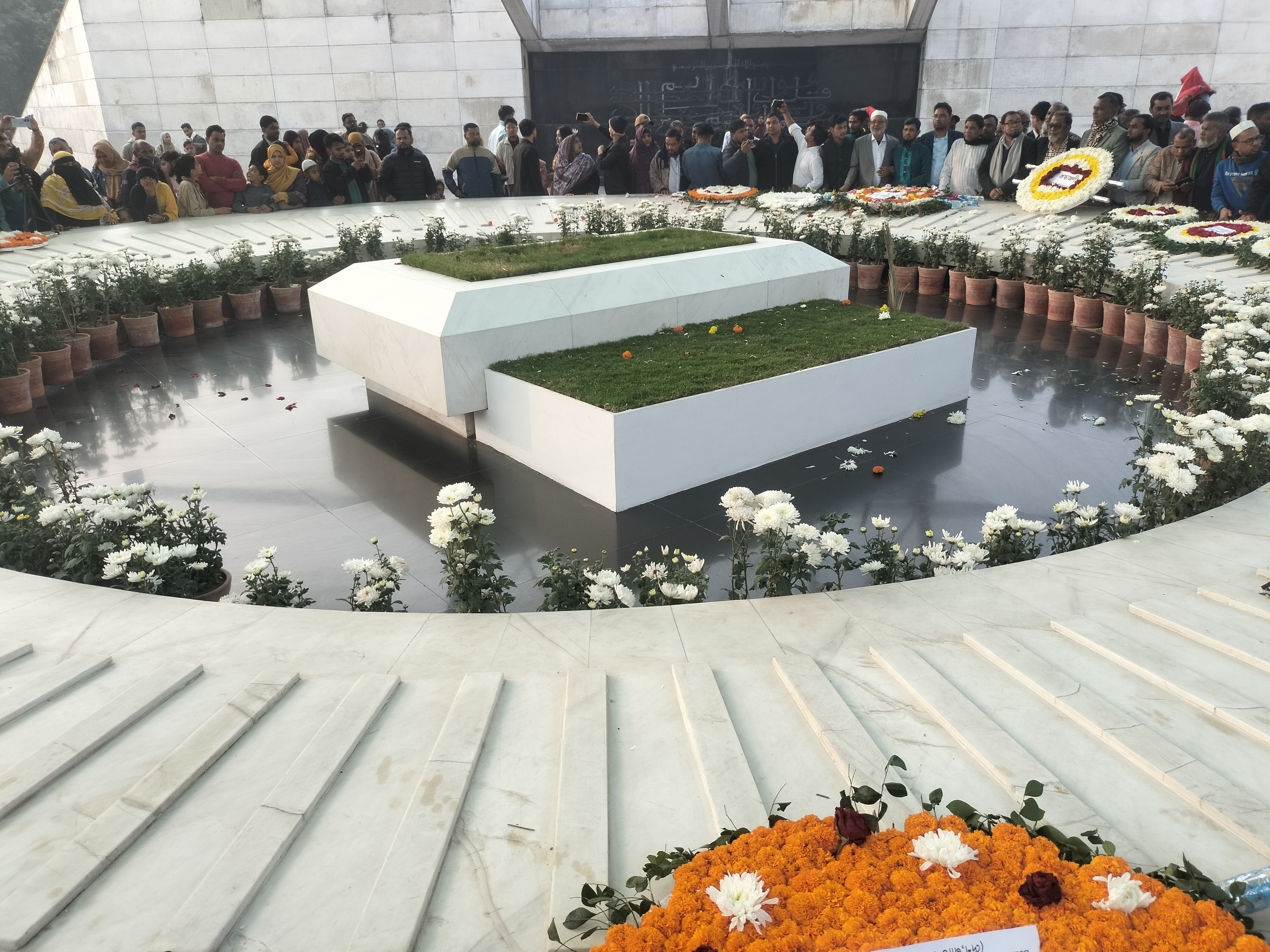
Begum Khaleda Zia's grave Beside Ziaur Rahman

=== Approach bridge ===
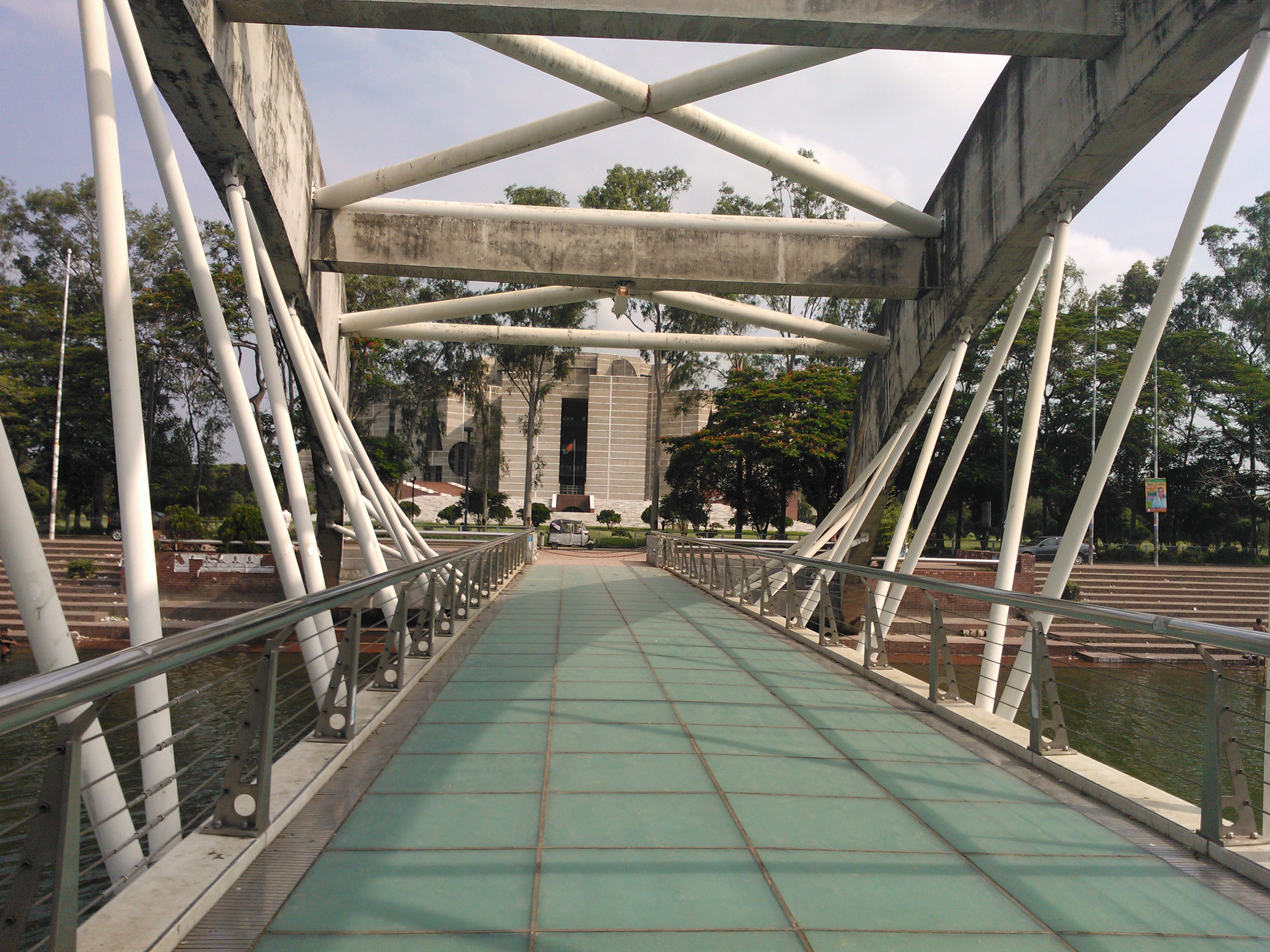
Main approach bridge

The approach bridge is the main entrance point of the mausoleum complex. It is a rainbow shaped suspended bridge, which is constructed right in the middle of the mausoleum. The surface of the bridge has glass marble engraved in it. Civil engineer A F M Saiful Amin analyzed the bridge for vibration serviceability. There is another bridge that can be accessed from the side of the Ministry of Defense's office.

=== Memorial Hall ===
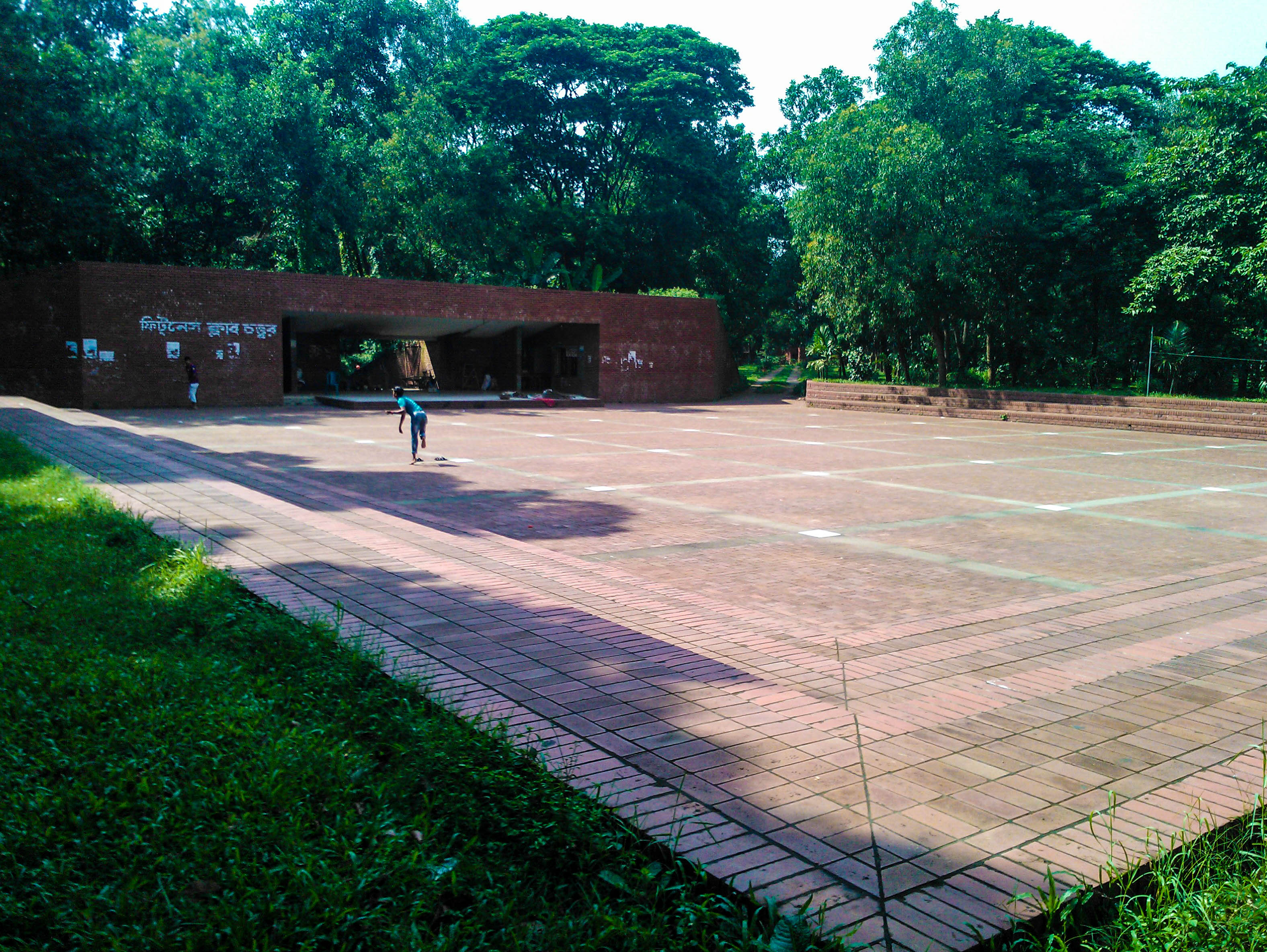
Chattar

The memorial hall is at the end of the complex, which is a two-story building. The upper floor is a mosque, and the lower floor contains a restroom, an archive library, and 100-person seminar hall.

=== Chattars ===
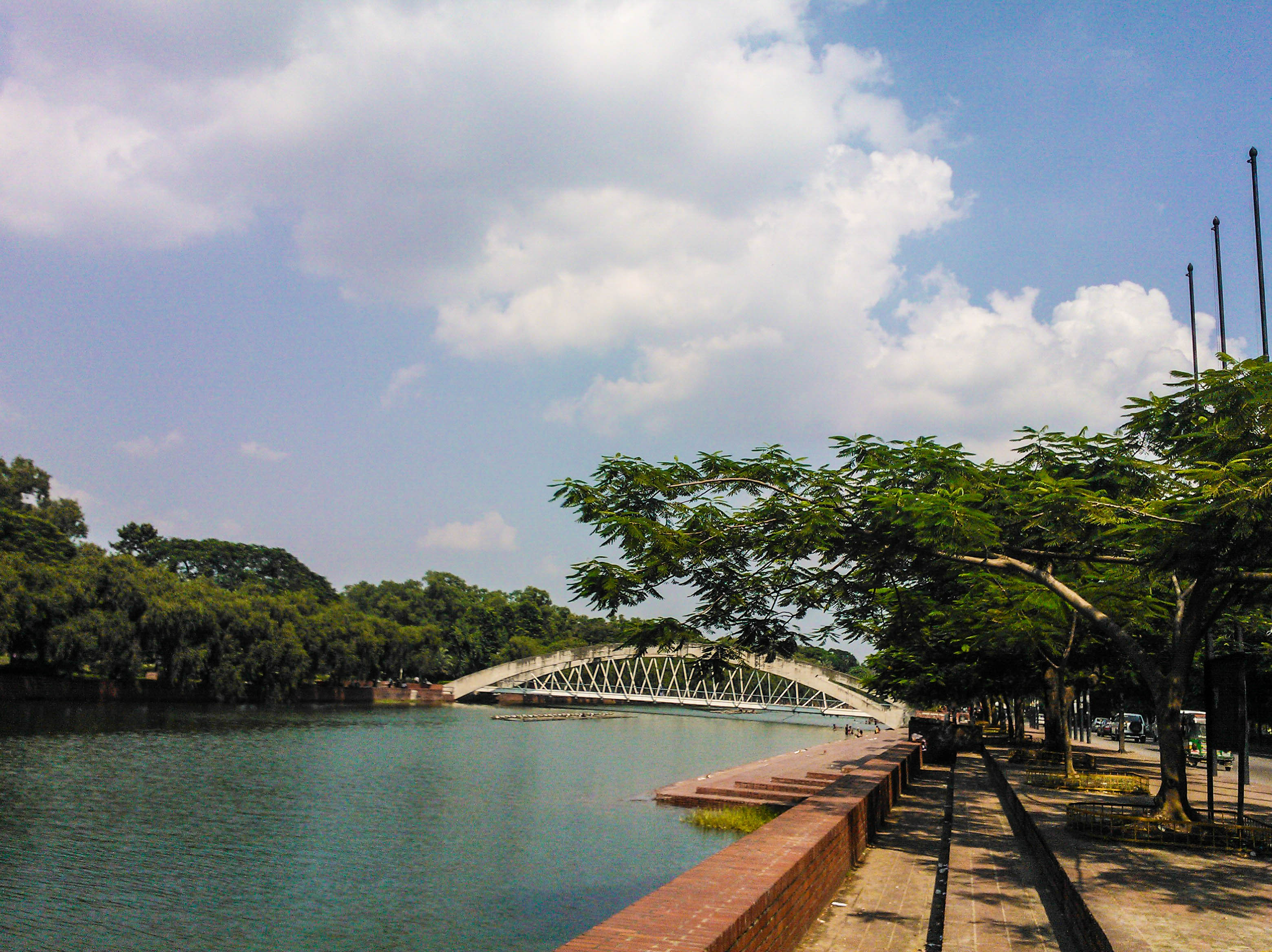
Crescent Lake

There are two chattar in Zia uddan, east and west. One of the chattars has a cafeteria.

=== Crescent Lake ===
Crescent Lake is like a 180 degree protractor lake. Deep blue water with stairs on one side.

=== Fountain ===
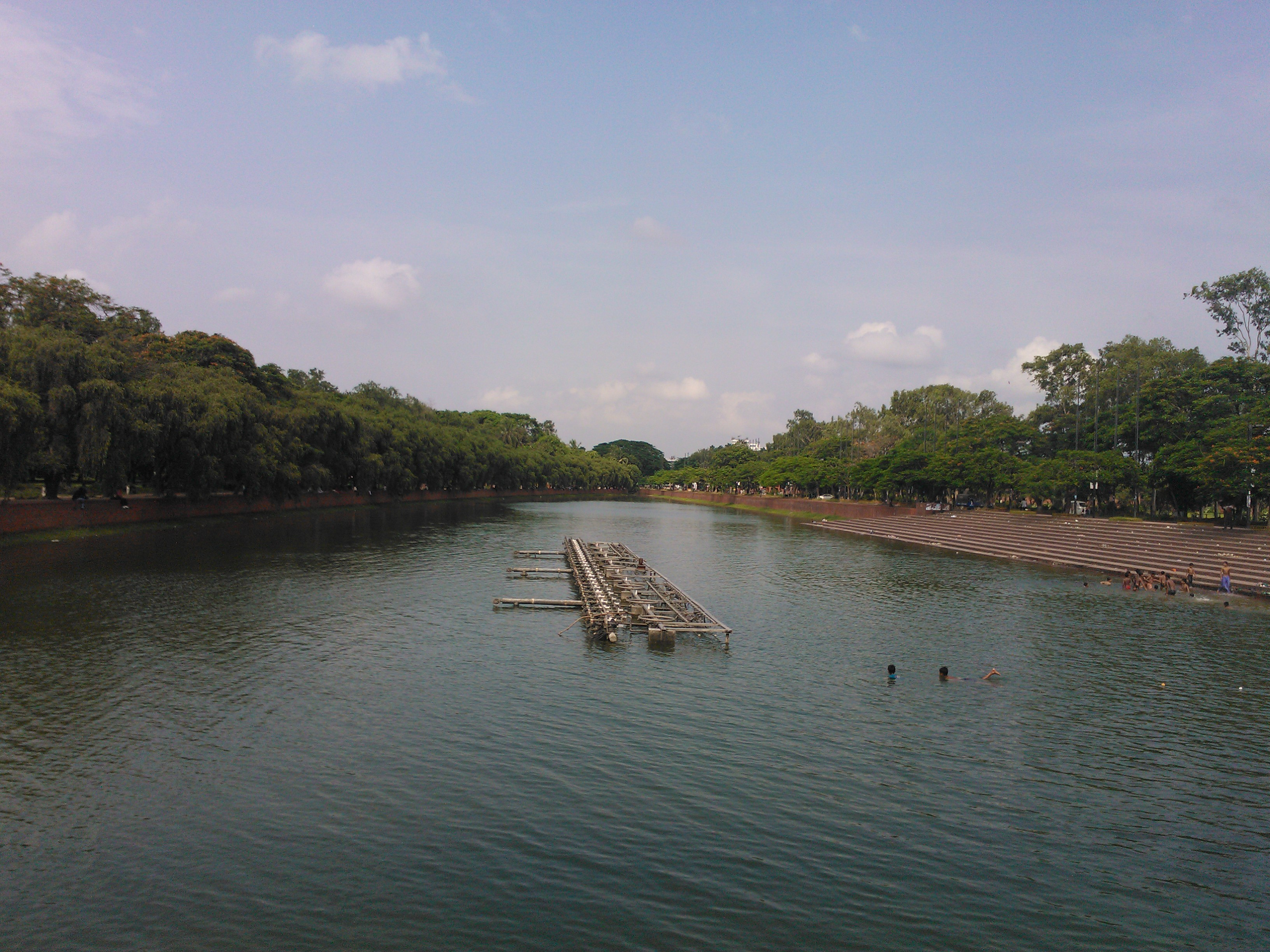
Fountain of lake

There are two fountains in the lake; both are beside the main approach bridge. They are lit at night from dusk till midnight. The fountains have colorful lights for beautification.

== Controversy ==
In 2015, Sheikh Hasina, AL leader and then prime minister, expressed her intention to relocate the mausoleum in order to implement the original master plan of the National Parliament House area. Later that same year, after the Ministry of Housing and Public Works submitted a report on the matter, procedure on the issue began. Initially, discussions were held about relocating the mausoleum to Bagbari, the birthplace of Rahman. However, the government later decided to relocate it to the Martyred Intellectuals' Cemetery in Mirpur. In 2018, housing minister Mosharraf Hossain stated that the government will transfer the complex from the present place to fulfill the original plan of the parliament area by Louis Kahn. The Bangladesh Nationalist Party have given an ultimatum regarding the news of the relocation of the mausoleum complex. In 2021, Mozammel Haque, the Minister of Liberation War Affairs, claimed the mausoleum does not contain the body of Ziaur Rahman and requested DNA tests be conducted to confirm this. He also announced the government's intention to remove all illegal structures from the vicinity of the Jatiya Sangsad Bhaban and implement the original plan of Louis Kahn.

== Vandalism ==
On 29 April 2015, a group of unknown people vandalised the tomb. After the incident, six police officers responsible for the protection of the tomb complex were detained.

== Gallery ==
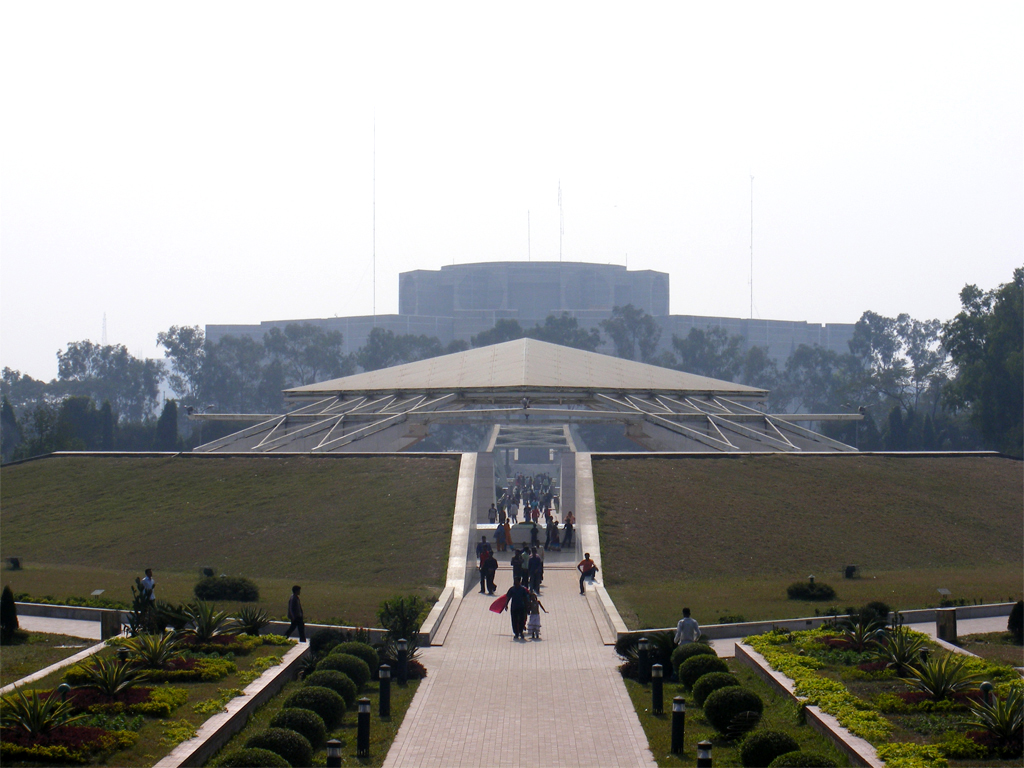
Mausoleum of Ziaur Rahman

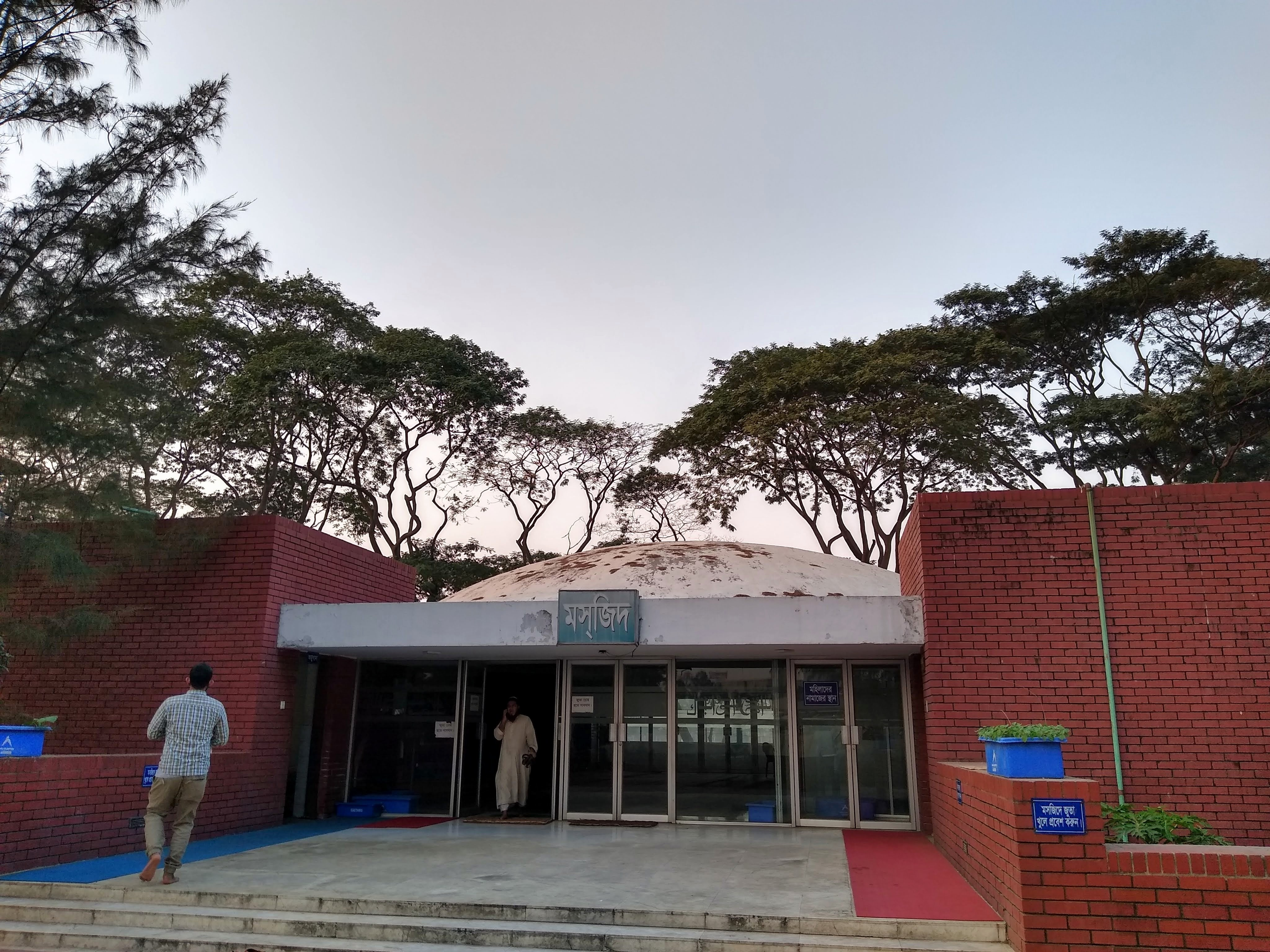
Mosque adjacent to the Ziaur Rahman Memorial Hall
