= Jatiya Sangsad Bhaban =

Parliament house of Bangladesh

- জাতীয় সংসদ ভবন
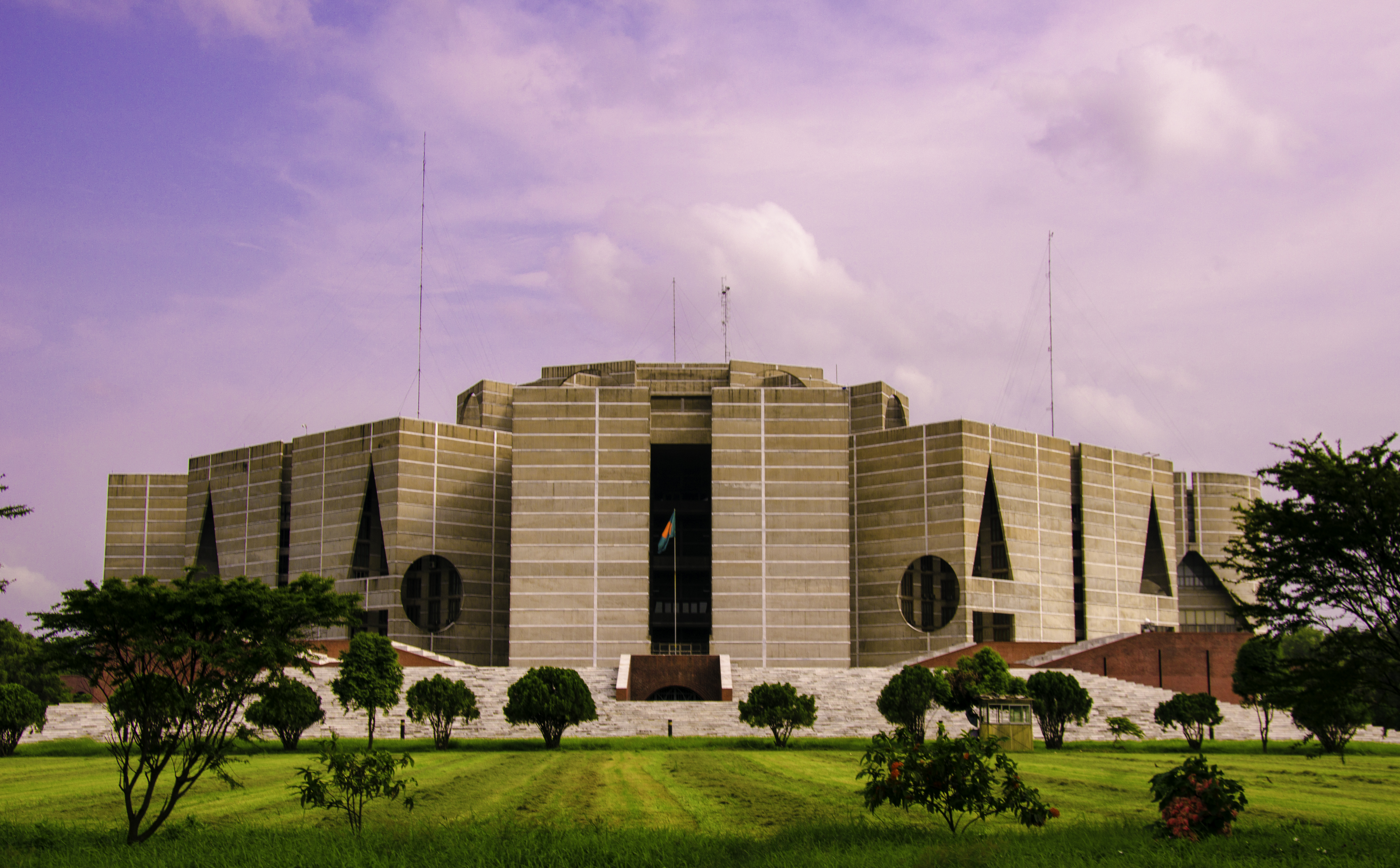
- Jatiya Sangsad Bhaban in 2014

- Location within Dhaka

General information
- Status: Functioning
- Architectural style: Modern, Monumental
- Location: Sher-e-Bangla Nagar Bangladesh, Dhaka, Bangladesh
- Coordinates: 23°45′44″N 90°22′43″E
- Construction started: 1961; 65 years ago
- Completed: January 28, 1982; 44 years ago
- Opened: February 15, 1982; 44 years ago
- Cost: US$32 million
- Owner: Government of Bangladesh

Technical details
- Floor area: 840,000 m^{2} (210 acres)

Design and construction
- Architects: Louis Kahn; Muzharul Islam

Other information
- Seating capacity: 350

The Jatiya Sangsad Bhaban (Note: Bengali: জাতীয় সংসদ ভবন, romanized: Jatiyô Sôngsôd Bhôbôn, lit. 'National Parliament House') is the Parliament house of Bangladesh, located at Sher-e-Bangla Nagar in Dhaka. Initially designed for the Parliament of Pakistan by architect Louis Kahn, the complex is one of the largest legislative complexes in the world, covering 840,000 m^{2} (210 acres).

== History ==
=== Establishment ===
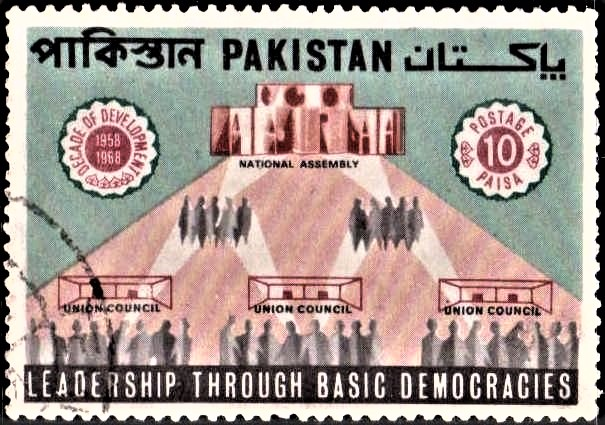
1968 postage stamp of Jatiya Sangsad Bhaban, issued by Pakistan Post

In 1959, commander-in-chief Ayub Khan seized power in Pakistan through a military coup and imposed martial law. Aware of the economic, social and political disparity between the two administrative units of Pakistan, East and West, Khan declared Dhaka, the provincial capital of East Pakistan, the country's second capital and decided to build one of the buildings of National Assembly of Pakistan in the city. He believed constructing a modern legislative complex would placate the people of East Pakistan. The government sought assistance from South Asian activist and architect Muzharul Islam who recommended bringing in the world's top architects for the project. He initially attempted to bring Alvar Aalto and Le Corbusier, who were both unavailable at the time. Islam then enlisted Louis Kahn, his former teacher at Yale. Kahn submitted a preliminary design of the proposed building in Dhaka in 1960, which was approved by the government and land was acquired for its construction in 1961. A year after Kahn was fully commissioned to construct the building, in 1963, he went to East Pakistan to complete its design and construction began in 1964. When the liberation war of Bangladesh started in 1971, the construction of the building stopped. Since the building construction was halted during the war, the constituent assembly of Bangladesh governed through what is now the Old Sangsad Bhaban. In 1974, three years after the independence of Bangladesh, the third Mujib ministry decided to continue construction without changing the original design. Kahn died when the project was approximately three-quarters completed and it continued under David Wisdom, who worked for Kahn. It was completed on 28 January 1982. It took total of ৳1,332.13 million to complete the parliament complex.

=== Current developments ===
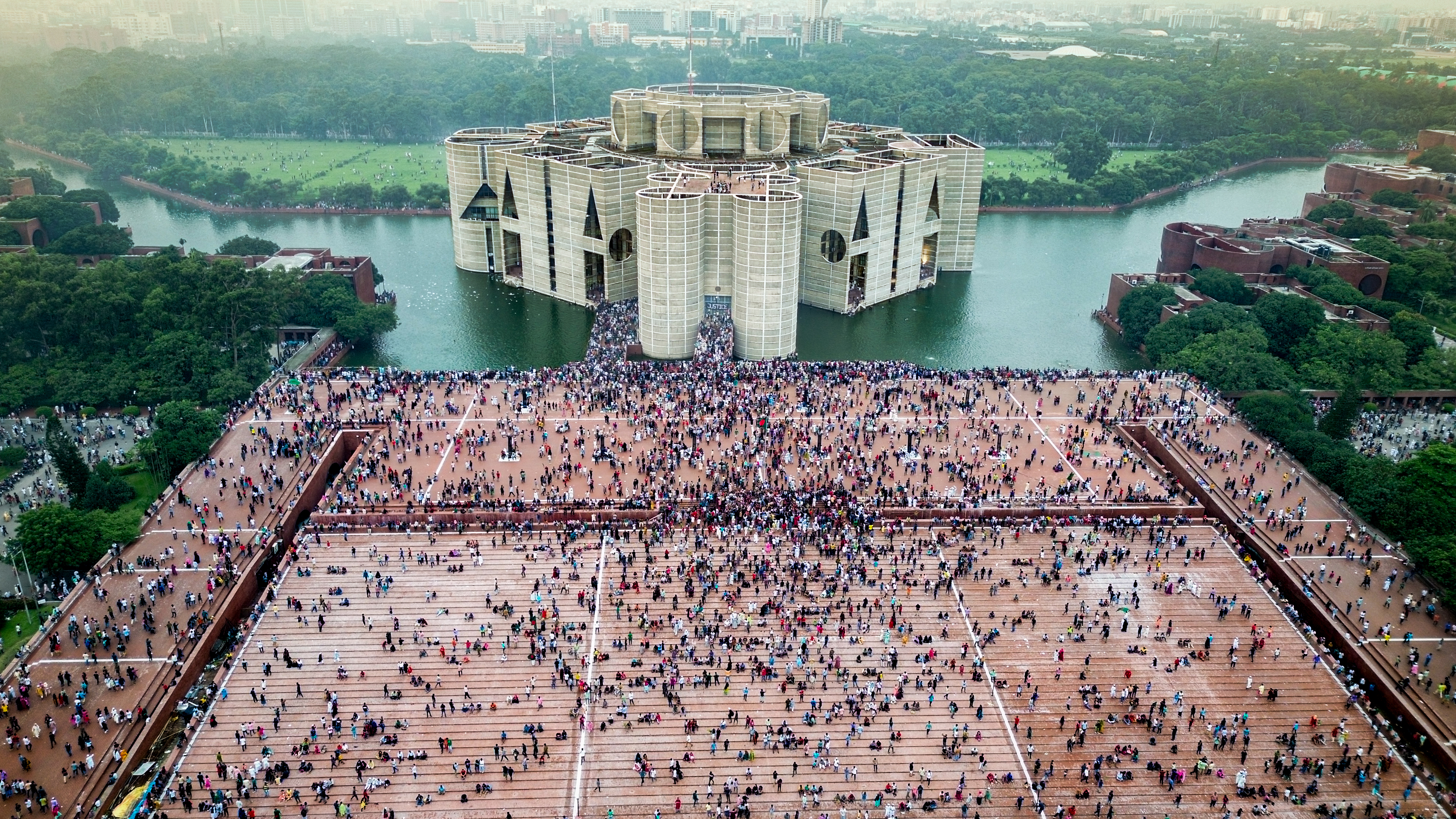
Jatiya Sangsad after the resignation of Sheikh Hasina in 2024

During the third Khaleda ministry, the government communicated plans to construct residences for the Speaker and Deputy Speaker. According to some prominent architects, no such plan existed in the original design.

In 2013, Prime Minister Sheikh Hasina declared to restore Louis Kahn's plans. In 2016, the third Hasina ministry decided to by bringing the original design from Louis Kahn's partner Henry Wilcots. On 6 October 2016, to restore the original design, the government announced to move the graves situated at the parliament area which includes the mausoleum of Ziaur Rahman. The Bangladesh Nationalist Party, which was established by Ziaur Rahman, objected to the decision. On 1 December 2016, the government received the plan. On 7 December 2016, Mirza Fakhrul Islam Alamgir, secretary general of the Bangladesh Nationalist party, alleged that by restoring the original design and removing the structures except the parliament building and the crescent lake, the government wants to reinstate the flag of Pakistan at the parliament area.

On the occasion of the Mujib Year in 2020, initiatives were taken to undertake renovation projects to modernize the Parliament building. According to the plan, the building included the construction of an archive of Sheikh Mujibur Rahman, modernization of some rooms, renovation of walkways, modernization of the MP Hostel area, reconstruction of the police barrack and construction of a studio for Sangsad Bangladesh Television, which was scheduled to be constructed by September 2024.

During a mass uprising on 5 August 2024, the building was stormed by protesters demanding Hasina's resignation. At that time the building was badly damaged due to attacks, vandalism and looting. Forty firearms were taken from building security by looters but were later returned by students. Other damaged and looted possessions included air conditioners, lifts, lights, electric lines, gates and numerous other infrastructural belongings. 192 rooms of the MP Hostel were also vandalised. It was estimated that nearly ৳300 crore (US$20 million) would require to repair the loss.

== History of use by Parliament ==
Twelve parliaments have used the Jatiya Sangsad Bhaban as the Parliament building:

1. First Parliament: 2 years 7 months (7th March 1973 – 6th November 1975)
2. Second Parliament: 2 years 11 months (2nd April 1979 – 24th March 1982)
3. Third Parliament: 1 year 5 months (10th July 1986 – 6th December 1987)
4. Fourth Parliament: 2 years 7 months (15th April 1988 – 6th December 1990)
5. Fifth Parliament: 4 years 8 months (5th April 1991 – 24th November 1995)
6. Sixth Parliament: 12 days (19th March 1996 – 30th March 1996)
7. Seventh Parliament: 5 years (14th July 1996 – 13th July 2001)
8. Eighth Parliament: 5 years (28th October 2001 – 27th October 2006)
9. Ninth Parliament: 5 years (6th January 2009 – 24th January 2014)
10. Tenth Parliament: 5 years (14th January 2014 - 7th January 2019)
11. Eleventh Parliament: 5 years (7th January 2019 - 7th January 2024)
12. Twelfth Parliament: 7 months (7th January 2024 - 6th August 2024)
13. Thirteenth Parliament: 29 days (12th March 2026 - Present Day)

== Architecture and design ==
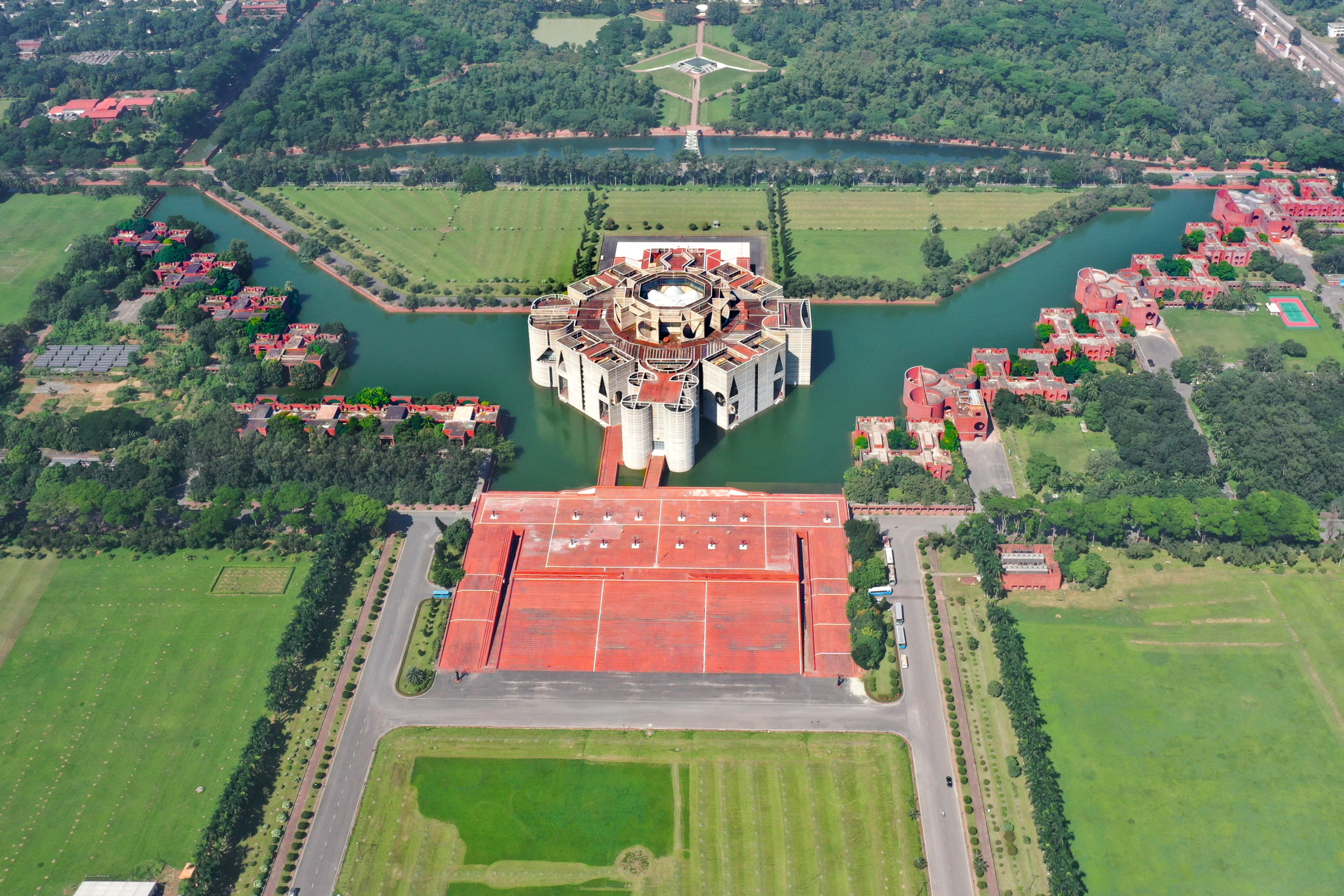
View of National Parliament of Bangladesh

Louis Kahn designed the entire Jatiya Sangsad complex, which includes lawns, lake and residences for the Members of the Parliament (MPs). The architect's key design philosophy was to represent Bengali culture and heritage, while at the same time optimizing the use of space. The exterior of the building is striking in its simplicity, with huge walls deeply recessed by porticoes and large openings of regular geometric shapes. The main building, which is at the center of the complex, is divided into three parts – the Main Plaza, South Plaza and Presidential Plaza. An artificial lake surrounds three sides of the main building of Jatiya Sangsad Bhaban, extending to the Members of Parliament hostel complex. The use of water features is intended to reflect the riverine landscape of Bangladesh and contributes to the site’s overall design.

=== Design philosophy ===
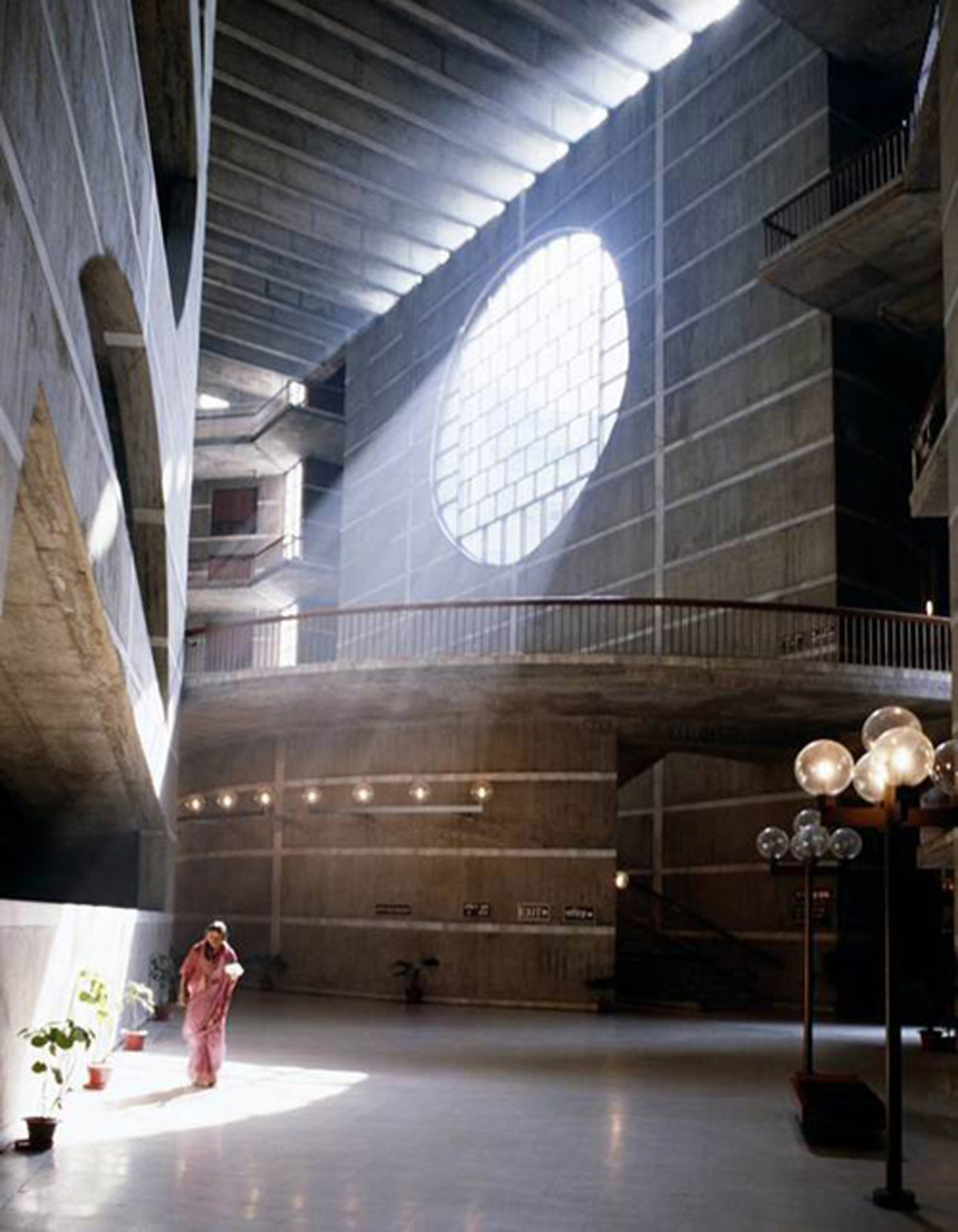
Play of light inside the building

Kahn's key design philosophy optimizes the use of space while representing Bengali heritage and culture. External lines are deeply recessed by porticoes with huge openings of regular geometric shapes on their exterior, shaping the building's overall visual impact.

In the architect Louis Kahn's own words:

In the assembly I have introduced a light-giving element to the interior of the plan. If you see a series of columns you can say that the choice of columns is a choice in light. The columns as solids frame the spaces of light. Now think of it just in reverse and think that the columns are hollow and much bigger and that their walls can themselves give light, then the voids are rooms, and the column is the maker of light and can take on complex shapes and be the supporter of spaces and give light to spaces. I am working to develop the element to such an extent that it becomes a poetic entity which has its own beauty outside of its place in the composition. In this way it becomes analogous to the solid column I mentioned above as a giver of light.

It was not belief, not design, not pattern, but the essence from which an institution could emerge...

The lake on three sides of the Bhaban, extending up to the Members' hostel, adds to the site's aesthetics and also portrays the riverine beauty of Bangladesh.

The Parliament building received the Aga Khan Award for Architecture in 1989.

=== Bhaban (main building) ===
The Bhaban consists of nine individual blocks: the eight peripheral blocks rise to a height of 110' while the central octagonal block rises to a height of 155'. All nine blocks include different groups of functional spaces and have different levels, inter-linked horizontally and vertically by corridors, lifts, stairs, light courts, and circular areas. The entire structure is designed to blend into one single, non-differentiable unit, that appears from the exterior to be a single story.

The main committee rooms are located at level two in one of the peripheral blocks. All parliamentary functionaries, including Ministers and chairpersons of some Standing Committees, have offices in the Bhaban. The Parliament Secretariat also occupies offices in the same building.

==== Main Plaza ====
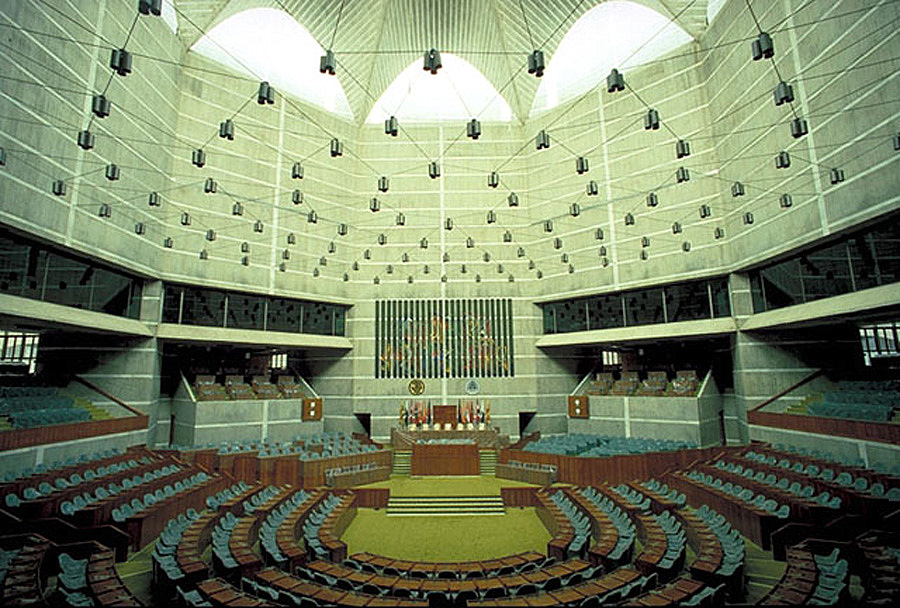
Parliament chamber in main plaza

The most important part of the Main Plaza is the Parliament Chamber, which can house up to 354 members during sessions. There are also two podia and two galleries for VIP visitors. The chamber has a maximum height of 117 ft (36 m) with a parabolic shell roof. The roof was designed with a clearance of a single story to let in daylight. Daylight, reflecting from the surrounding walls and octagonal drum, filters into the Parliament Chamber. The efficient and aesthetic use of light was a strong architectural capability of Louis Kahn.

The artificial lighting system has been carefully devised to provide zero obstruction to the entry of daylight. A composite chandelier is suspended from parabolic shell roof. This chandelier in turn consists of a metallic web, spanning the entire chamber, that supports the individual light fixtures.

Upper levels of the block (that contains the Chamber) contain the visitor and press galleries, as well as communication booths, all of which overlook the Parliament Chamber. The block also contains a library at level one, MPs' lounges at level three, and party rooms at the upper level.

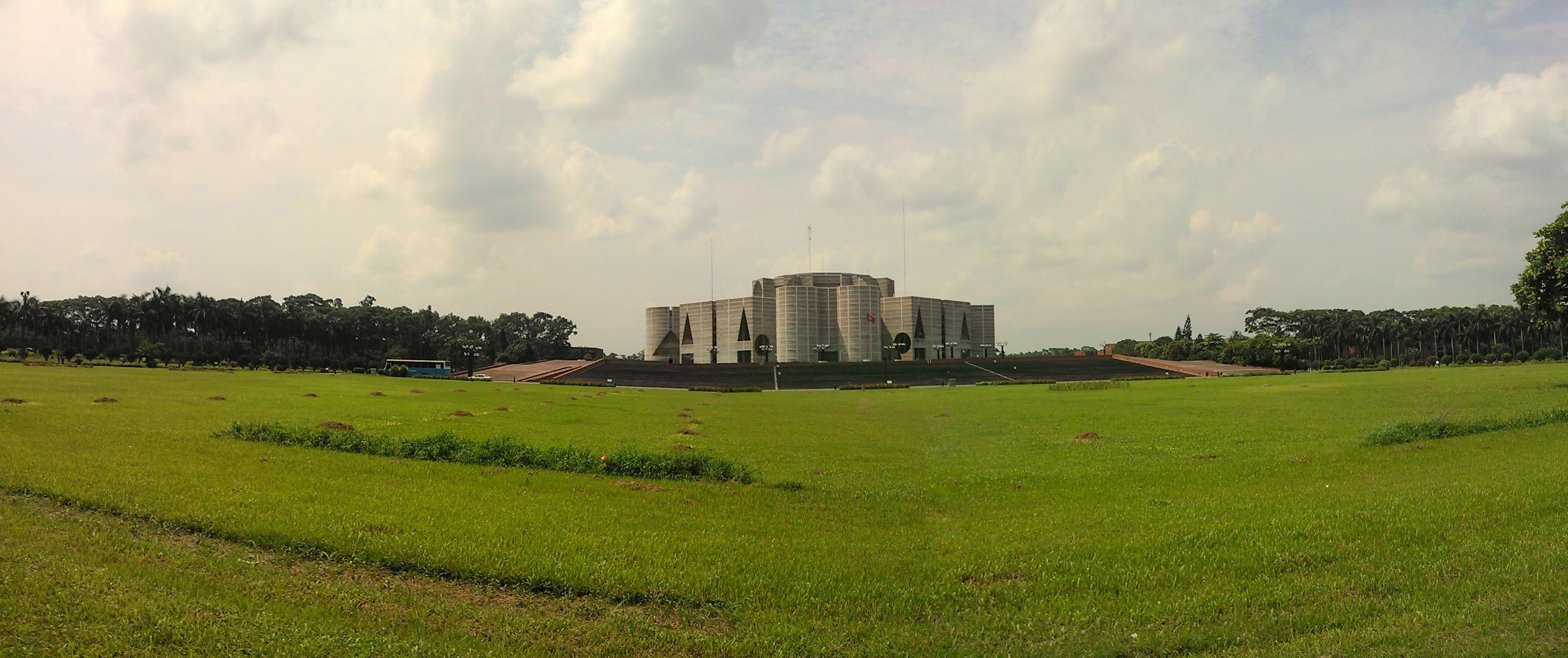
Panoramic view of Jatiyo Sangsad Bhaban

==== South Plaza ====
The South Plaza faces the Manik Mia Avenue. It gradually rises to a 20 feet height and serves as a beautiful exterior as well as the main entrance (used by members during sessions) to the Parliament Building. It contains controlling gates, a driveway, a main mechanical plant room, offices of maintenance engineers, equipment stores, and an open plaza with steps and ramps leading directly to the main building.

==== Presidential Plaza ====
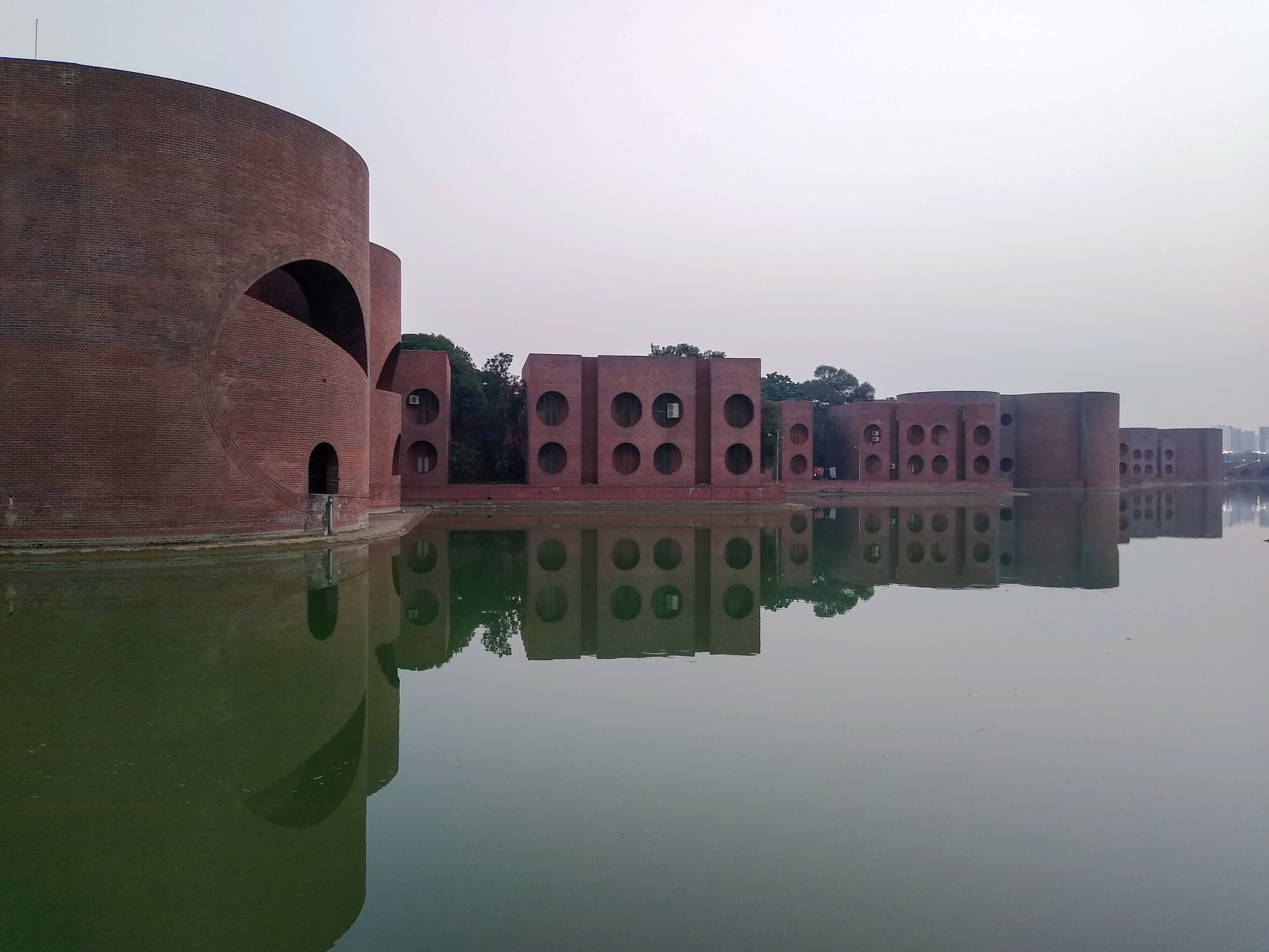
Presidential Plaza

The Presidential Plaza lies to the north and faces the Lake Road. It functions as an intimate plaza for the MPs and other dignitaries. It contains marble steps, a gallery and an open pavement.

== Tourism and accessibility ==
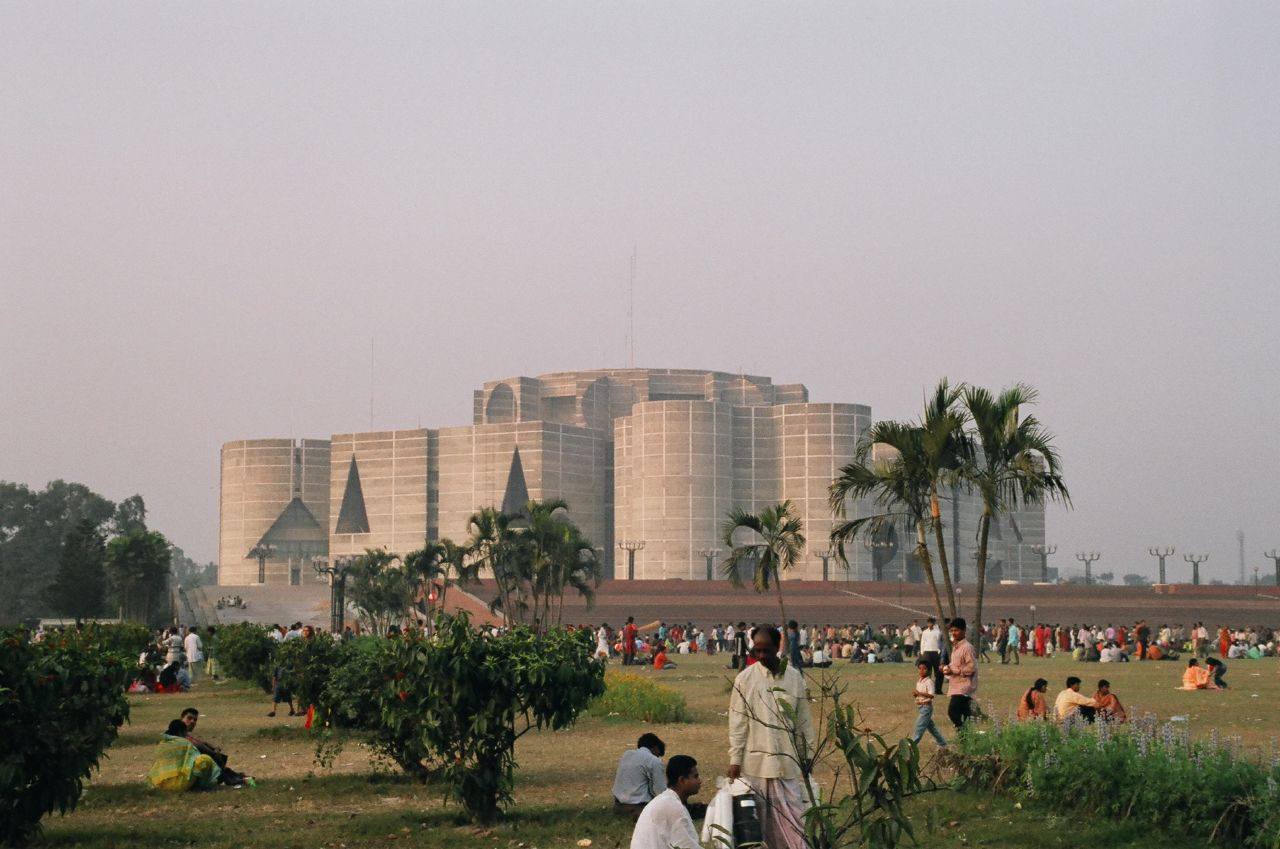
Jatiya Sangsad from Zia Uddan

Although entrance to the Bhaban, the main building, is limited to authorized members of Parliament and staff, the Jatiyo Sangshad complex is always open to visitors. North of the complex, across the Lake Road, is Crescent Lake and Zia Udyan. The two complexes together form a major attraction for tourists in Dhaka, especially during national holidays. The complexes are popular among joggers and skaters of Dhaka as well, since the complex is a popular walking route - which can be seen every morning and evening. The area is one of the higher security zones of Dhaka.

The complex can be accessed using any of the four roads surrounding it, however, Manik Mia Avenue and Lake Road are the easiest approaches.

Foreign tourists have the opportunity to visit the Parliament building by paying a fee.

== Legacy ==
The building was featured prominently in the 2003 film My Architect, detailing the career and familial legacy of its architect, Louis Kahn. Robert McCarter, author of Louis I. Kahn, described the National Parliament of Bangladesh as one of the twentieth century's most significant buildings.

== See also ==
- Palace of Assembly, similar legislative complex in Chandigarh, India
