= Zia Udyan =

Park in Dhaka, Bangladesh

Coordinates: 23.767°N 90.378°E

Zia Uddan
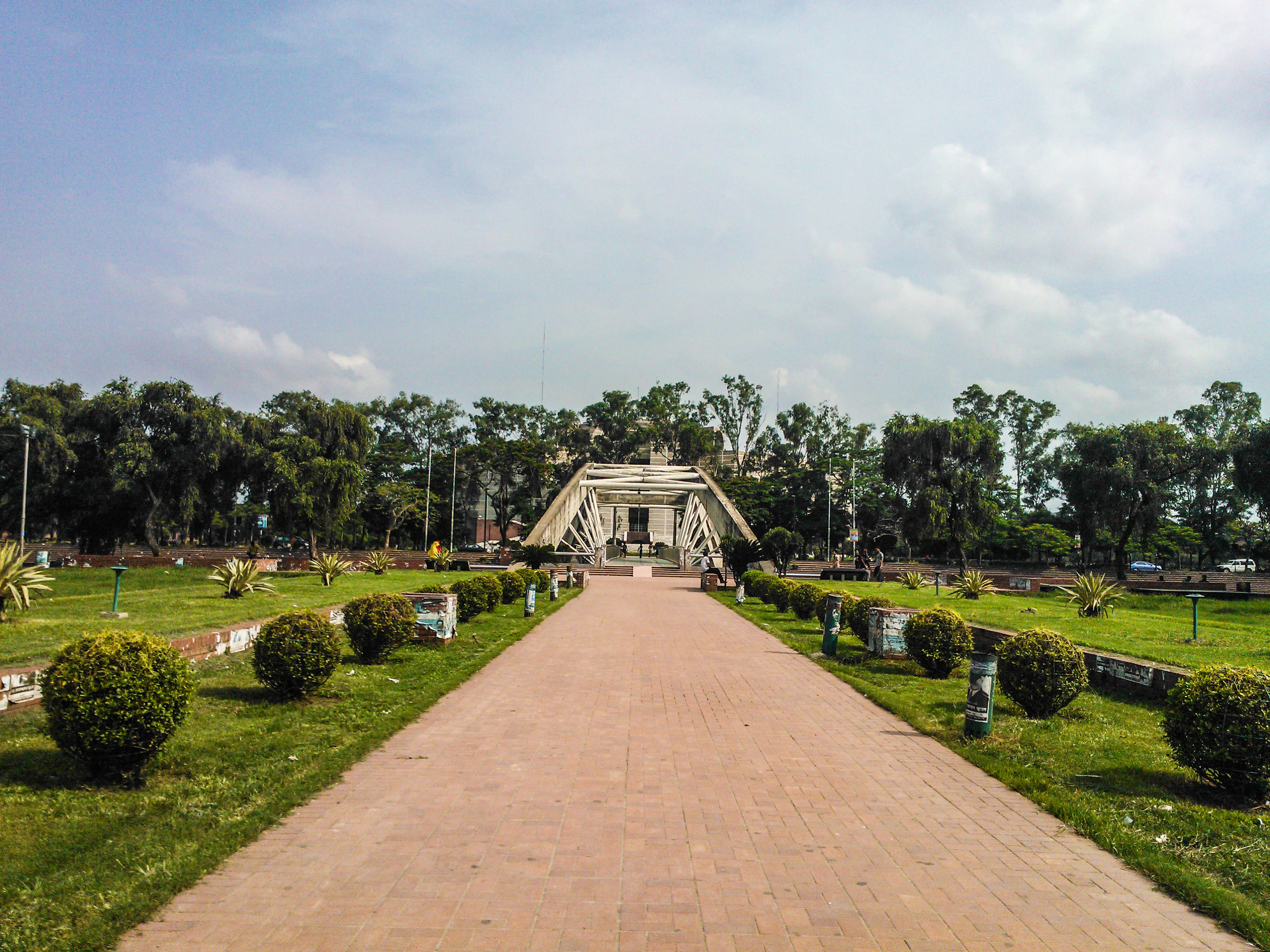
- Main entrance of Zia Uddan
- Interactive map of Zia Uddan
- Type: Botanical garden
- Location: Shere-Bangla Nagar, Dhaka, Bangladesh
- Area: 73 acres (0.30 km^{2})
- Status: always open

Zia Udyan or Zia Uddan (Bengali: জিয়া উদ্যান), also known as Chandrima Uddan (Bengali: চন্দ্রিমা উদ্যান, lit. 'Moonlight Park') is a park situated across the National Parliament Building in Dhaka, Bangladesh.

== History ==
The 73-acre (0.30 km^{2}) park is notable for being the place where the former Bangladeshi President, Ziaur Rahman was buried. It is connected to the road with a bridge which runs over Crescent Lake, dug in the 1965–1966 fiscal year. In 2025, Ziaur Rahman's widow, former prime minister Khaleda Zia, was buried beside him at the park.

Following the fall of the Sheikh Hasina led Awami League government in August 2024, Chandrima Udyan was renamed to its previous name Zia Udyan.

== Gallery ==
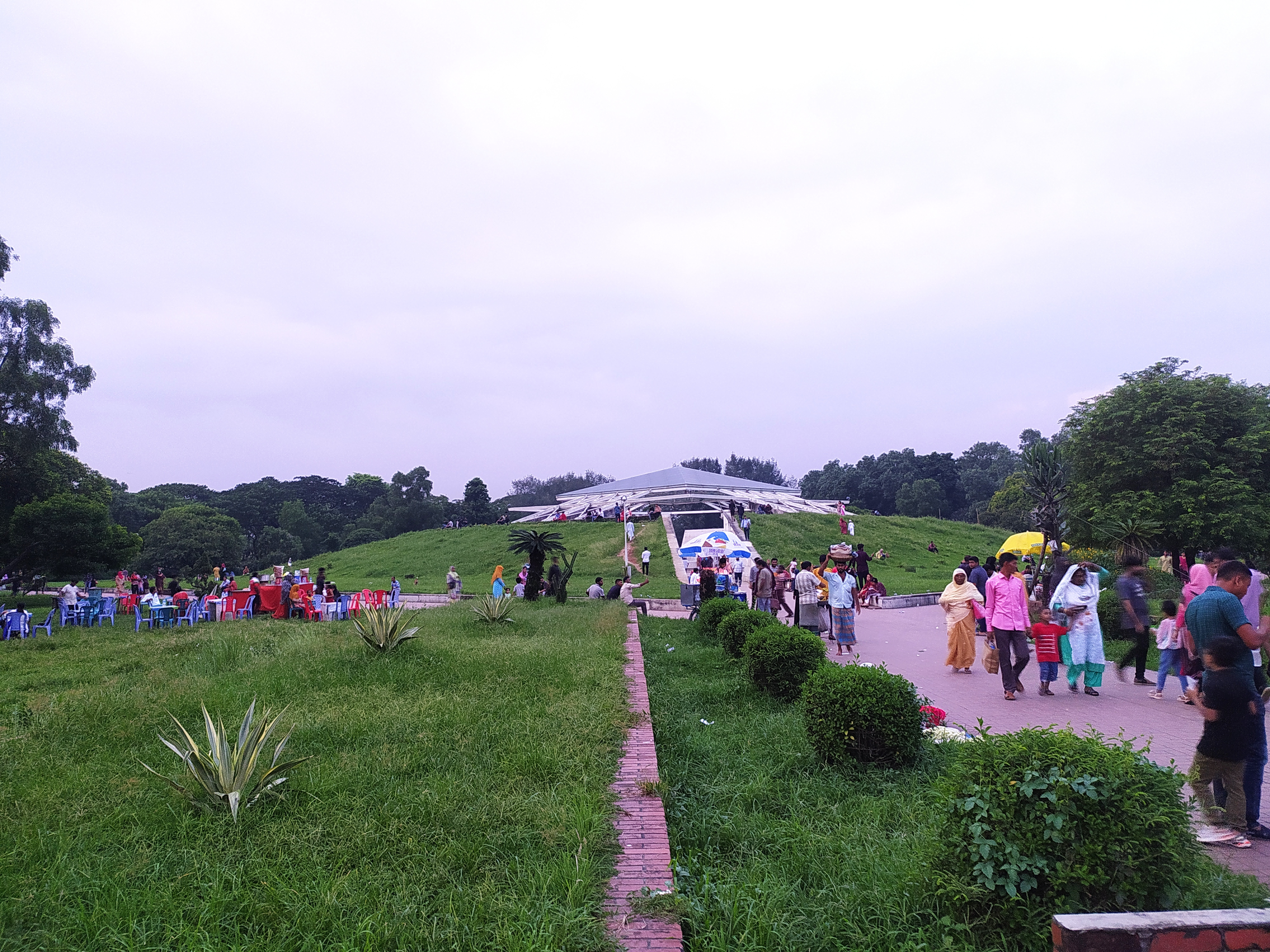
Zia Uddan in 2023

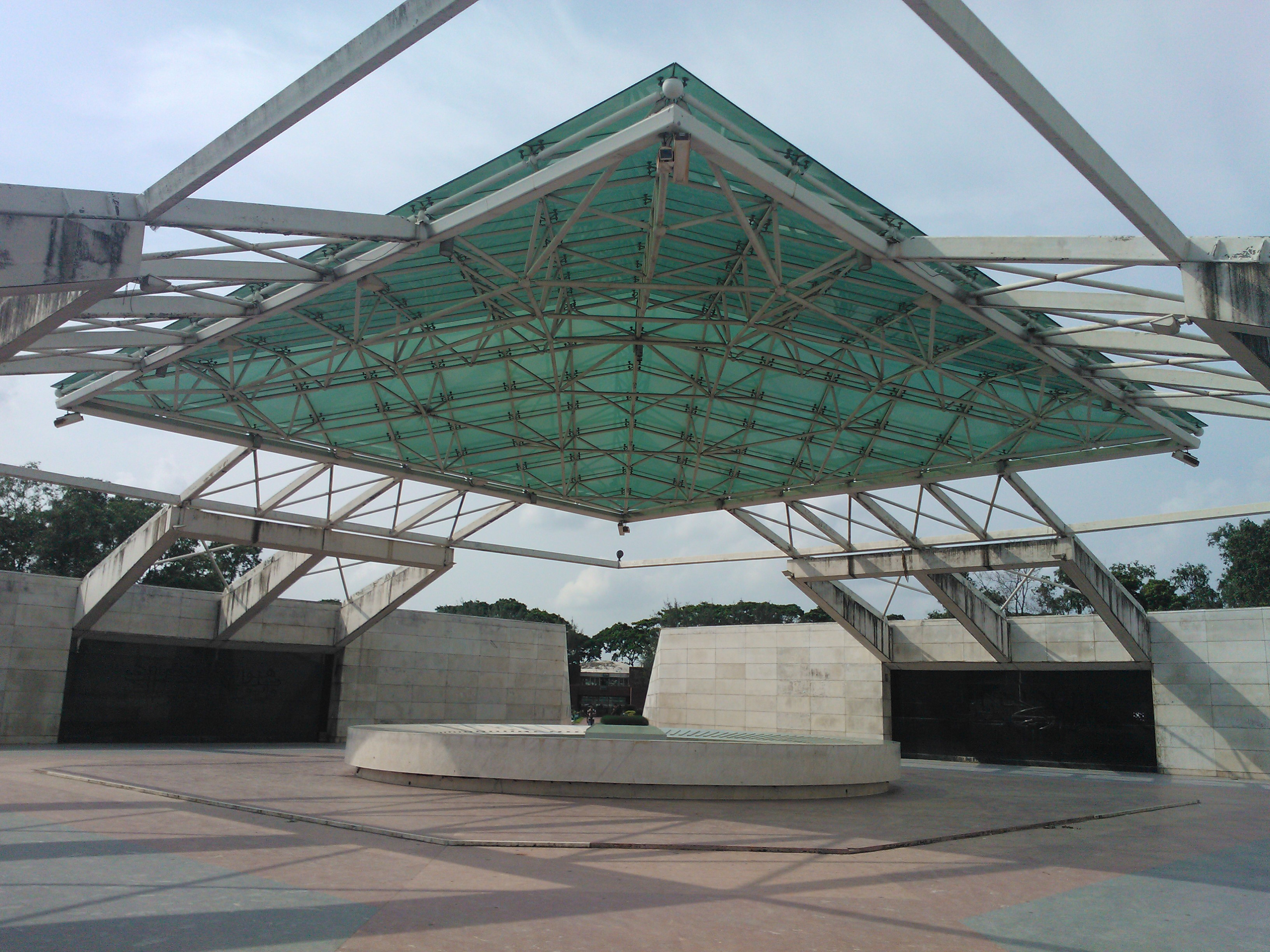
Mausoleum of Ziaur Rahman in Chandrima Uddan

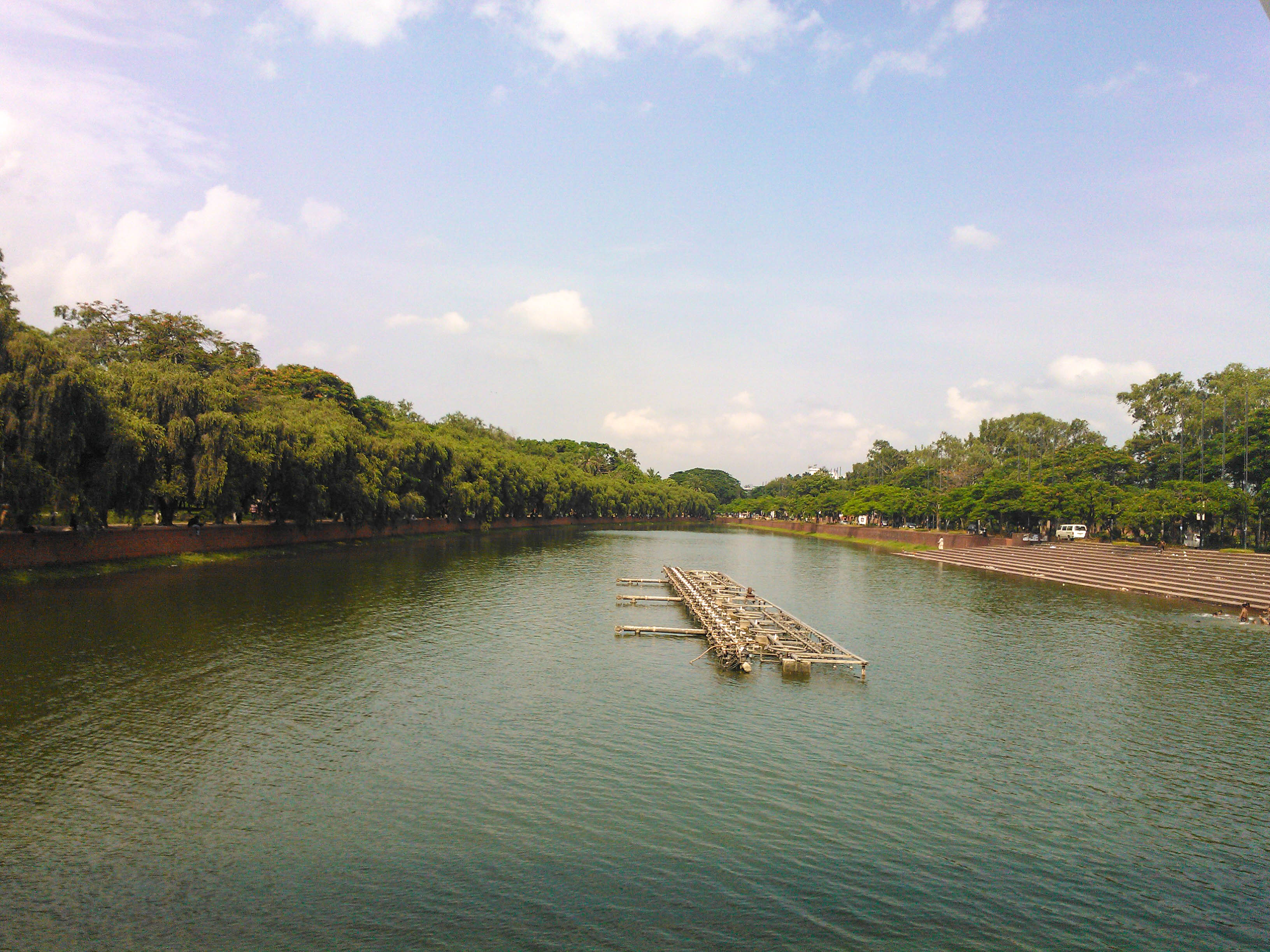
Crescent Lake

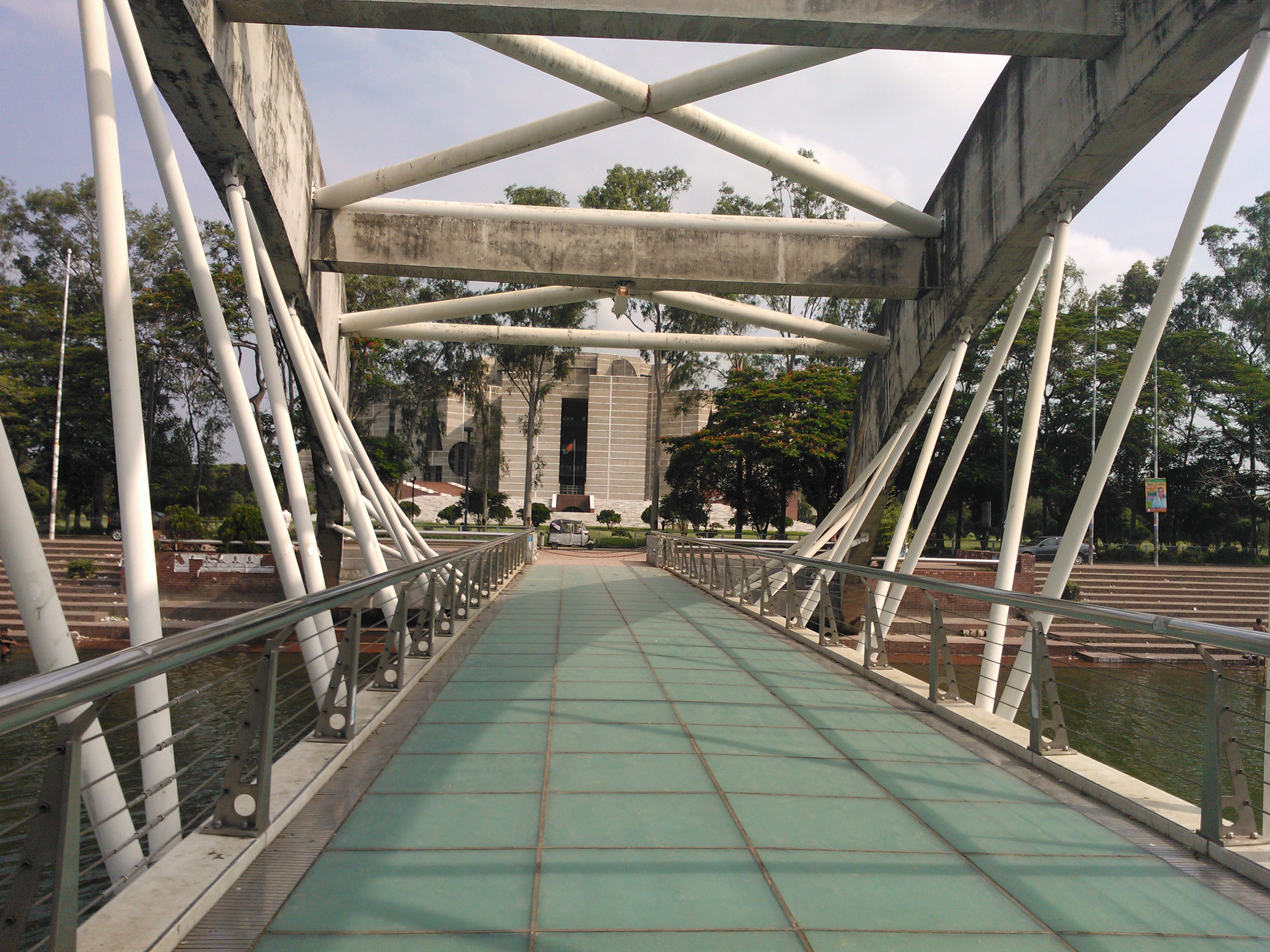
Bridge over Crescent Lake

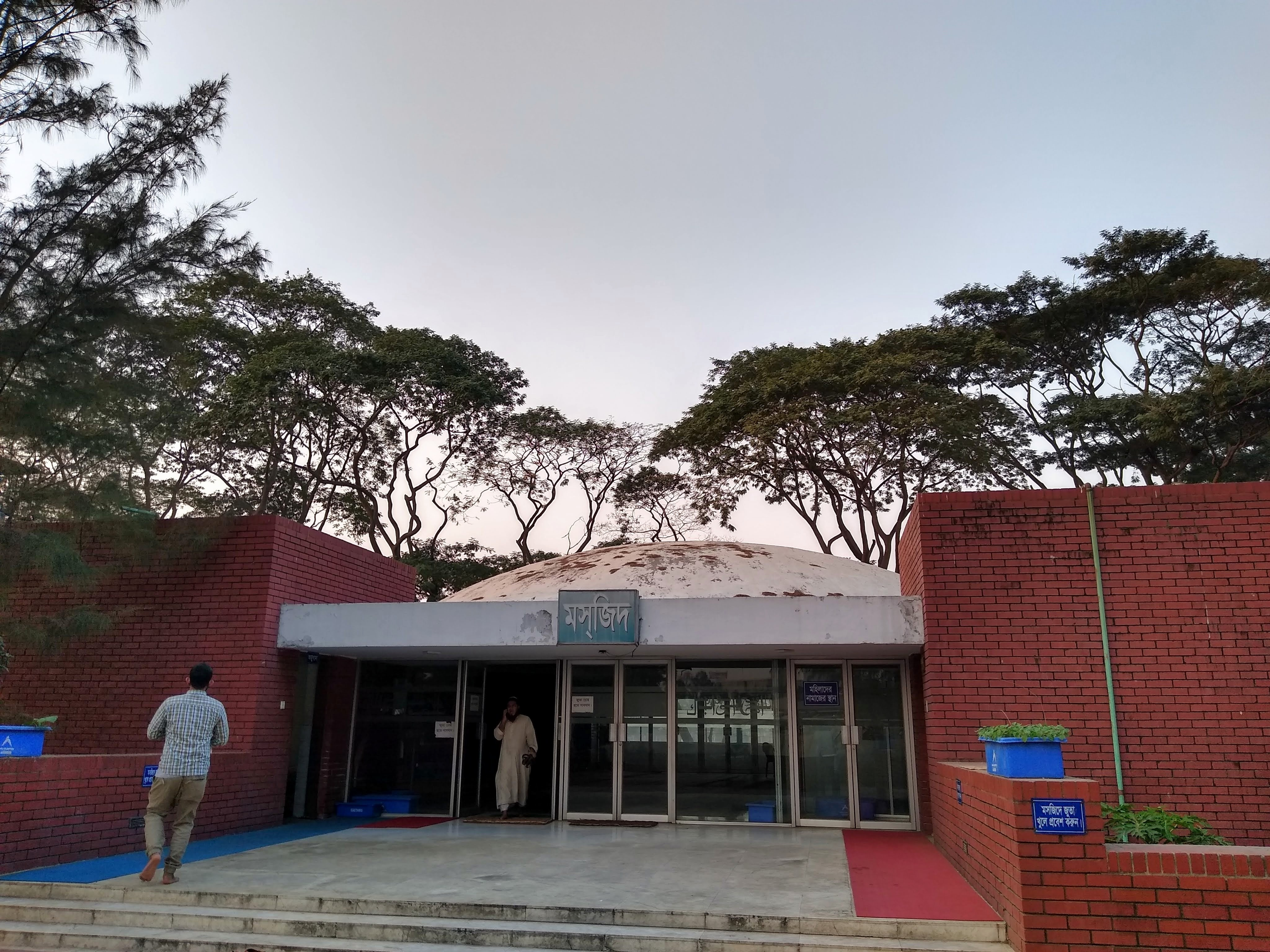
Zia Uddan Mosque

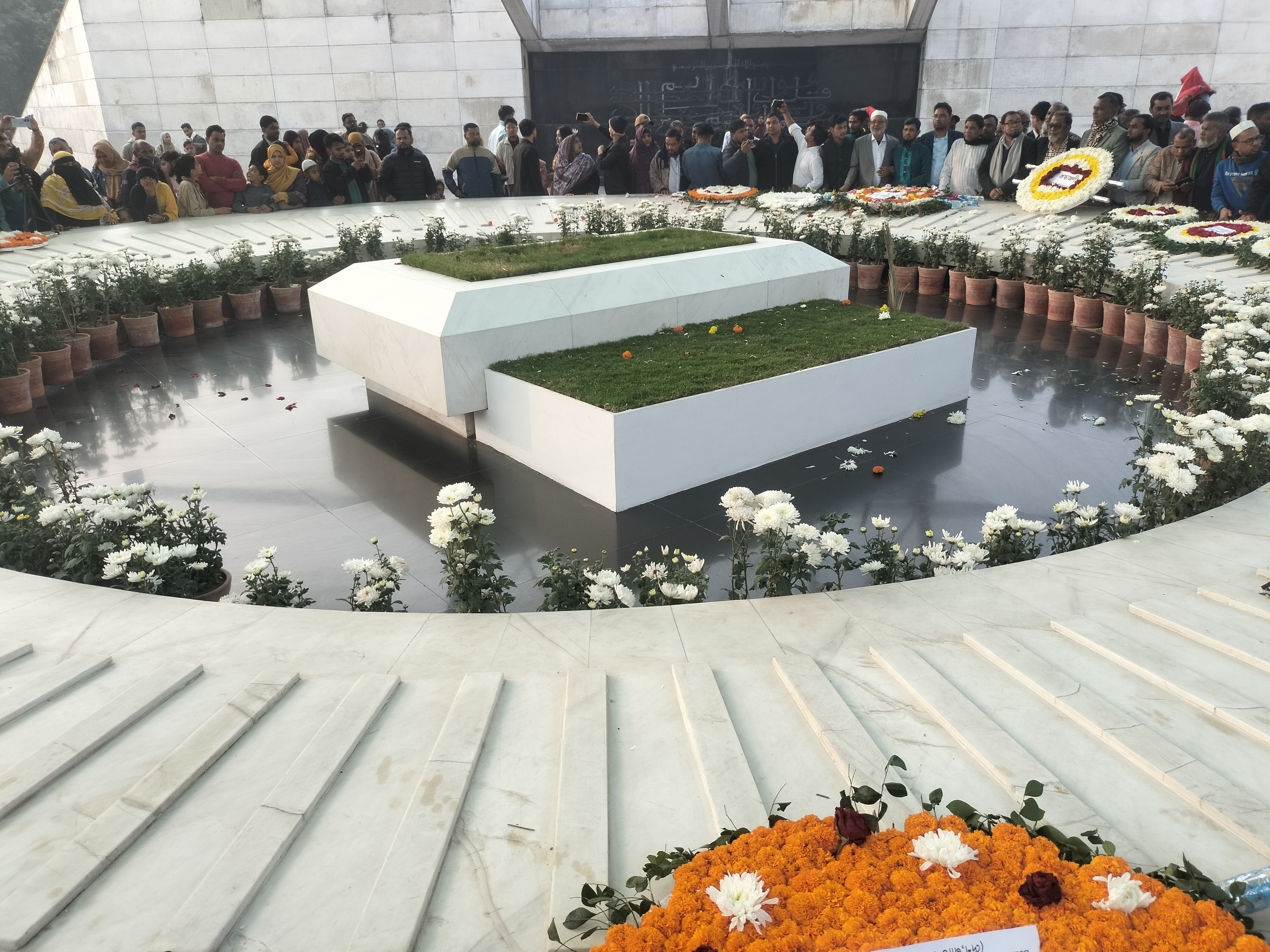
Begum Khaleda Zia's grave Beside Ziaur Rahman
