= Abdul Wahhab Pirji =

Bangladeshi Islamic scholar

Mawlana Abdul Wahhab Pirji Huzur
- আব্দুল ওহাব পীরজী

Personal life
- Born: Abdul Wahhab; 1890 Homna, Tipperah District, Bengal Presidency
- Died: September 29, 1976 (aged 85–86) Bangladesh
- Resting place: Azimpur Graveyard, Dhaka
- Education: Dhaka Mohsinia Madrasa; Mazahir Uloom; Darul Uloom Deoband

Religious life
- Religion: Islam
- Denomination: Sunni
- Jurisprudence: Hanafi
- Movement: Deobandi

Muslim leader
- Teacher: Anwar Shah Kashmiri; Abdul Wahid Allahabadi
- Disciple of: Ashraf Ali Thanwi; Zafar Ahmad Usmani
- Disciples: Fazlul Haque Amini
- Students: Azizul Haque Muhammad Shahidullah Aminul Islam Shamsul Haq Daulatpuri Qutbuddin Kanaighati Obaidul Haque Wazirpuri Momtazuddin
- Arabic name
- Personal (Ism): ʿAbd al-Wahhāb عبد الوهاب
- Patronymic (Nasab): ibn Aḥsanullāh بن أحسن الله
- Epithet (Laqab): Pīrjī Ḥuḍūr بيرجي حضور
- Toponymic (Nisba): al-Kumillāʾī الكملائي

Abdul Wahhab Pirji (Bengali: আব্দুল ওহাব পীরজী; 1890 – 29 September 1976), popularly referred to as Pirji Huzur (Bengali: পীরজী হুজূর), was a Bangladeshi Islamic scholar, author and educationist. He was a disciple of Ashraf Ali Thanwi and the founding principal of Jamia Hussainia Ashraful Uloom in Bara Katara, Dhaka.

== Early life and education ==
Abdul Wahhab was born in 1890 to a Bengali Muslim family of Munshis in the village of Ramkrishnapur in Homna, then located under the Tipperah District (now Comilla District) of the Bengal Presidency. His father, Munshi Ahsanullah, was a devout Muslim and maintained close relations with the ulama. His elder brother was the husband of Ghulam Azam's paternal aunt.

He completed his initial studies at his local madrasa, and then enrolled at the Dhaka Mohsinia Madrasa where he studied for several years. Abdul Wahhab then travelled to Saharanpur where he became a student at the seminaries of Mazahir Uloom and Darul Uloom Deoband respectively. In Saharanpur, he completed Hadith studies under Anwar Shah Kashmiri and the sciences of tajweed with Abdul Wahid Allahabadi, as well as studying logic, philosophy, Islamic jurisprudence and tafsir. He graduated with a sanad from the Dawra-e-Hadith in Darul Uloom Deoband and then began his journey within Sufism by becoming a murid of and pledging bay'ah to his murshid Ashraf Ali Thanwi for six months. After Thanwi's death in 1943, Pirji would become a disciple of Zafar Ahmad Usmani.

== Career ==
After returning to Bengal as a qualified muhaddith in 1930, Pirji dedicated his life to teaching the Islamic sciences. Between 1930 and 1935, he taught as a professor of Hadith at the Jamia Islamia Yunusia in Shahidbaria and the Gazaria Madrasa in Khulna. In 1936, he co-founded the Jamia Hussainia Ashraful Uloom in Dhaka alongside Shamsul Haque Faridpuri and Muhammadullah Hafezzi with the assistance of local businessman Hafez Hussain Ahmad of Jinzira. He also founded numerous other madrasas in the country such as the Jamia Arabia Islamia Emdadul Uloom, which he established in 1948 in Rahmatpur, Homna. As a disciple of Ashraf Ali Thanwi, Pirji was also associated with the Pakistan Movement.

He also served as an imam of several mosques throughout his life, and led the janaza of Hakim Habibur Rahman as requested in the latter's will. Abdul Wahhab would refer to Abu Hammad Mahbubul Baset as a Qutb. He subsequently served as the madrasa's first and lifelong principal.

== Death and legacy ==
Pirji died in 1976, and was buried at the Azimpur Graveyard in Dhaka, Bangladesh. His three sons, including Pirzada Rashid Ahmad, continue to run the Jamia Hussainia Ashraful Uloom madrasa. He had many students including Azizul Haque, Muhammad Shahidullah, Aminul Islam, Fazlul Haque Amini, Obaidul Haque Wazirpuri, Shamsul Haq Daulatpuri, Qutbuddin Kanaighati and Momtazuddin.

== See also ==
- List of Deobandis
