= Mahfuzul Haque =

Bangladeshi Islamic scholar

- মাহফুজুল হক
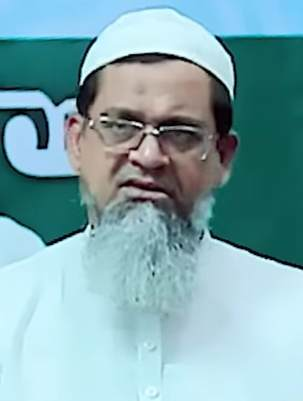

Secretary General, Befaqul Madarisil Arabia Bangladesh
- Incumbent
- Assumed office 2020
- Preceded by: Abdul Quddus

Secretary General, Bangladesh Khelafat Majlis
- In office 2013–2020
- Succeeded by: Mamunul Haque

Chancellor, Jamia Rahmania Arabia, Dhaka
- Incumbent
- Assumed office 2002
- Preceded by: Azizul Haque

Member of the Standing Committee of Al Haiatul Ulya
- Incumbent
- Assumed office 2020

Personal life
- Born: November 1969 (age 56–57) Dacca, East Pakistan
- Children: 1
- Parent: Azizul Haque (father)
- Era: Modern
- Main interest(s): Hadith, Fiqh, Tasawwuf, Politics
- Education: Darul Uloom Deoband; Jamia Qurania Arabia Lalbagh; Jamia Rahmania Arabia, Dhaka
- Relatives: Mamunul Haque (brother); Nurul Haque Miah (brother-in-law)

Religious life
- Religion: Islam
- Denomination: Sunni
- Jurisprudence: Hanafi
- Movement: Deobandi

Muslim leader
- Influenced by: Shah Ahmad Shafi, Hafezzi Huzur, Azizul Haque
- Influenced: Mamunul Haque

Mahfuzul Haque (born November 1969) is a Bangladeshi Deobandi Islamic scholar, politician, educator and public speaker. He is the former vice-president of Hefazat-e-Islam Bangladesh, secretary general of Befaqul Madarisil Arabia Bangladesh, Chairman of the Shariah Supervisory Committee of Social Islami Bank, Governor of Islamic Foundation Bangladesh, chancellor of Jamia Rahmania Arabia, Dhaka and president of regional Qawmi education board Ittefaqul Madarisil Qawmia Muhammadpur. He is also a member of the standing committee of Al Haiatul Ulya and was the secretary-general of Bangladesh Khelafat Majlis.

== Early life and family ==
Mahfuzul Haque was born in November 1969, in Azimpur, Dhaka. He belongs to a Bengali Muslim family of Qadis originally from the village of Bhirich Khan, in Louhajang, Munshiganj. His father, Azizul Haque, was the founder of the Khelafat Majlish and first Bengali translator of Sahih al-Bukhari. Mamunul Haque is his younger brother, an influential Islamic speaker and politician in Bangladesh.

== Education ==
He started his primary education with his father Azizul Haque. Then he was admitted to Azimpur Chan-Tara Hefz Madrasa. He memorized the Qur'an at the age of 11 under Abdul Matin.

Then he was admitted to Jamia Qurania Arabia Lalbagh. In 1984, at the age of 14, he joined anti-Ershad movement led by Hafezzi Huzur, and was arrested.

In 1986, he was admitted to Bara Katara Madrasa. Later he moved to Jamia Mohammadpur that was being founded by his father, Azizul Haque. It was shifted to the side of Sat Gambuj Mosque named Jamia Rahmania Arabia, Dhaka. He completed his master's in Hadith from Jamia Rahmania in 1991. In 1992, he went to Darul Uloom Deoband and studied master's in Hadith for second time.

== Career ==
After completing his education, he started his career by joining as a teacher of Jamia Rahmania Arabia, Dhaka in 1993, where he was in the department of "Islamic Law and Research" and received an approved certificate and became a Mufti.

In 2000, Azizul Haque started a madrassa called Jamia Haqiqia and was appointed its director. In 2001, he was promoted to assistant director of Jamia Rahmania and in 2002 to chancellor. In 2005, he was elected Joint Secretary General of Befaqul Madarisil Arabia Bangladesh and on 3 October 2020, he was elected Secretary General.

After being appointed a teacher of Jamia Rahmania he became involved in the politics of Khelafat Majlish. In 2005, he was elected a member of Majlis-e-Shura of this party. He was elected vice-president in 2012 and secretary general in 2013. After being elected the secretary general of Befaq, he resigned as the secretary general of Khelafat on 10 October 2020, as per constitution.

The Bangladeshi law gave him the right to be a member of the Standing Committee of Al-Haiatul Ulya Lil-Jamiatil Qawmia Bangladesh.

== Family ==
In family life, he is the father of four children and all the members of his family are Hafiz.
