= Abdul Jabbar Jahanabadi =

Mawlana from Bangladesh

Mawlana Muhammad Abdul Jabbar Jahanabadi

Personal life
- Born: 1937 Sahabatkathi, Kachua, Bagerhat
- Died: 18 November 2016 (aged 78–79) Holy Family Red Crescent Hospital, Moghbazar, Dhaka, Bangladesh
- Cause of death: Old age
- Children: 3 daughters
- Era: Modern era
- Main interest: Islamic education

Religious life
- Religion: Islam
- Denomination: Sunni
- Jurisprudence: Hanafi
- Movement: Deobandi

Muslim leader
- Teacher: Hafezzi Huzur; Qazi Mu'tasim Billah; Shamsul Haque Faridpuri; Azizul Haque

Secretary-General of Befaqul Madarisil Arabia Bangladesh
- In office 1992-2016
- Preceded by: Ataur Rahman Khan
- Succeeded by: Abdul Quddus

Muhammad Abdul Jabbar Jahanabadi (Bengali: মোহম্মদ আব্দুল জব্বার জাহানাবাদী) was an Islamic scholar and secretary general of Befaqul Madarisil Arabia Bangladesh. He has been described as a pioneer to Islamic education in the erstwhile newly founded country of Bangladesh.

== Early life and education ==
Jahanabadi was born into a Bengali Muslim family from the village of Sahabatkathi in Kachua, Bagerhat. He was the second child among a family of five brothers and a sister. His father was Shaykh Nasimuddin, and his studies began at home with his family as well as the local maktab, where he learnt the Quran. In 1961, Abdul Jabbar completed his master's degree from the faculty of Hadith studies at the Ashraful Uloom Madrasa in Bara Katara, Dacca.

== Career ==
Jahanabadi's career began at the madrasa he graduated from - he started teaching at the Bara Katara Madrasa in the 1960s. He was also responsible for the Bangladesh Qawmi Madrasah Education Board, then under the leadership of Nur Uddin Gohorpuri, from its creation in 1978 until his death. Jahanabadi was one of the key leaders to advocate for the recognition of Qawmi Madrasa certificates by the Government of Bangladesh. He authored a pamphlet, was the first to submit a paper to a government office and the syllabus of the proposed Qaumi Charter was made by him. He was the first person to be officially recognized by the Qaumi Charter.

He created and managed many madrasas. Before becoming secretary-general of Befaqul Madarisil Arabia Bangladesh in 1992, Jahanabadi served as the Dhaka city General Secretary of Jamiat Ulema-e-Islam Bangladesh. He became a founding member of the Jamia Islamia Darul Uloom Madania in Jatrabari Thana, and served as a teacher there for a short time.

== Death and legacy ==
Jahanabadi died on 18 November 2016 at 79 years of age in a Dhaka hospital at 10:10am. He had been suffering from respiratory problems in the heart and kidneys. After Isha prayer, his janaza was performed in the national mosque of Bangladesh, Baitul Mukarram. The Bangladeshi Minister of Education at the time, Nurul Islam Nahid of the Awami League political party, expressed his condolences for who he viewed to be a pioneer to Bangladesh's madrasa system.

== Written works ==
Jahanabadi has written and edited numerous books, school textbooks, poems, stories and essays. His works include:

- কওমি মাদ্রাসার স্বীকৃতি আমরা কেন চাই [Why we want recognition for Qawmi Madrasas] (in Bengali).
- ইসলাম ও আধুনিক প্রযুক্তি [Islam and Modern Technology] (in Bengali).
- মাদরাসা শিক্ষার বিরুদ্ধে আন্তর্জাতিক ষড়যন্ত্র [International Conspiracy Against Madrasa Education] (in Bengali).
- ভারত উপমহাদেশে মুসলিম শাসন ও তাদের গৌরবময় ইতিহাস [Muslim Rule and Their Glorious History in Indian Subcontinent] (in Bengali).
- ইসলামে নারীর অধিকার ও পাশ্চাত্যের অধিকার বঞ্চিতা লাঞ্ছিতা নারী [Women's Rights in Islam and the Rights-Deprived, Harassed Women of the West] (in Bengali).
- ইসলামে নিরক্ষরতা দূরীকরণ ও কলমের চর্চা [Practice of pens and driving away illiteracy in Islam] (in Bengali).

=== Textbooks ===
- ইংরেজী বর্ণমালা শিক্ষা [English Alphabet Education] (in Bengali). Befaqul Madarisil Arabia Bangladesh.
- আদর্শ শিশু শিক্ষা [Ideal child education] (in Bengali). Befaqul Madarisil Arabia Bangladesh.
- আদর্শ ধারাপাত ও অংক শিক্ষা [Ideal numeracy and mathematics education] (in Bengali). Befaqul Madarisil Arabia Bangladesh.

== See more ==
- List of Deobandis
