= Mamunul Haque =

Bangladeshi Islamic scholar

Sheikh al-Hadith , Mufti Mamunul Haque
- মামুনুল হক
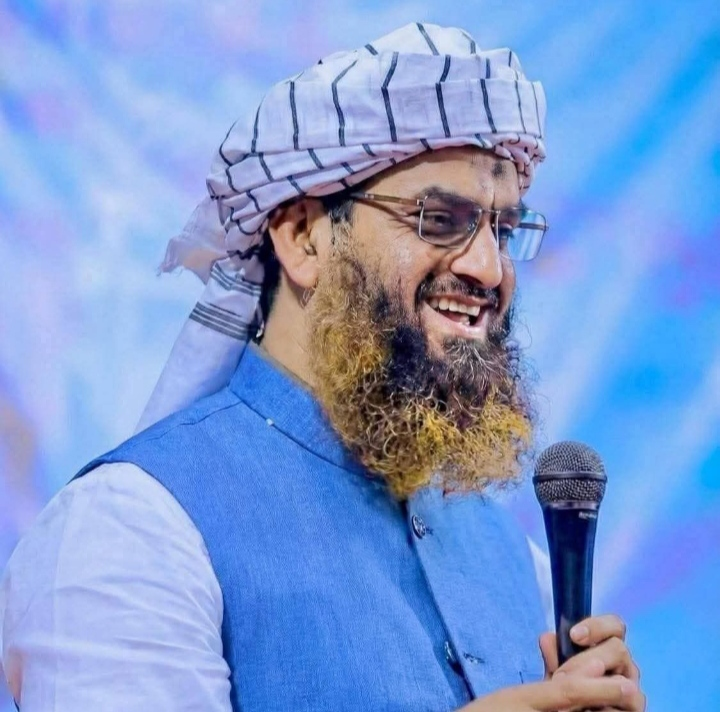
- Haque in 2025

Emir of Bangladesh Khelafat Majlis
- Incumbent
- Assumed office 11 January 2025
- General Secretary: Jalaluddin Ahmad
- Preceded by: Ismail Nurpuri

Joint Secretary-General of Hefazat-e-Islam Bangladesh
- Incumbent
- Assumed office 31 August 2023
- Emir: Muhibbullah Babunagari

Personal details
- Born: 3 September 1973 (age 53) Azimpur, Dhaka
- Party: Bangladesh Khelafat Majlis
- Relations: Mahfuzul Haque (brother); Nurul Haque Miah (brother-in-law)
- Parent: Azizul Haque (father)
- Education: Jamia Rahmania Arabia; Asian University of Bangladesh
- Occupation: Politician

Religious life
- Religion: Islam
- Denomination: Sunni
- Jurisprudence: Hanafi
- Movement: Deobandi

Mamunul Haque (born November 1973) is a Bangladeshi Islamic scholar who is serving as the Emir of Bangladesh Khelafat Majlis and Joint Secretary-General of Hefazat-e-Islam Bangladesh.

With an ancestral heritage of religious scholarship and political leadership from his father, Azizul Haque, he succeeded his father as a Sheikh al-Hadith at Jamia Rahmania Arabia. He is best known for his hardline advocacy for the establishment of an Islamic state and the integration of Sharia laws into government policies. Haque has been a central figure in several national crises. In 2020 and 2021, he led opposition to the construction of a sculpture of Sheikh Mujibur Rahman and organized anti-Modi protests, which made him the undisputed Hefazot-e-Islam's leader overnight. In April 2019, the Ministry of Home Affairs designated Haque as one of 15 "controversial speakers" due to his rhetoric during religious sermons and issued six recommendations to monitor and restrict his public appearances. In the 2026 Bangladeshi general election, he contested the Dhaka-13 constituency but was lost to Bangladesh Nationalist Party's candidate Bobby Hajjaj.

Haque has been described as a polarizing figure in Bangladeshi politics due to his opposition to secular social reforms. In 2025, he participated in a nationwide movement calling for the dissolution of the interim government's Women's Affairs Reform Commission and advocated limiting women's roles in the public sphere. His statements regarding gender and religious minorities in Bangladesh have been described by Human Rights Watch and secular activists as misogynistic and exclusionary.

He has been imprisoned three times under the Sheikh Hasina regime. Following the fall of her regime, Mamun participated in governmental meetings with the President of Bangladesh, Mohammed Shahabuddin and the Chief of Army Staff, Waker-Uz-Zaman, which eventually led to the formation of the Yunus ministry. In addition to his political and religious activities, he has served as an adjunct professor at Asian University of Bangladesh and is the editor of Rahmani Paigam, a monthly magazine published in Dhaka.

== Life account ==
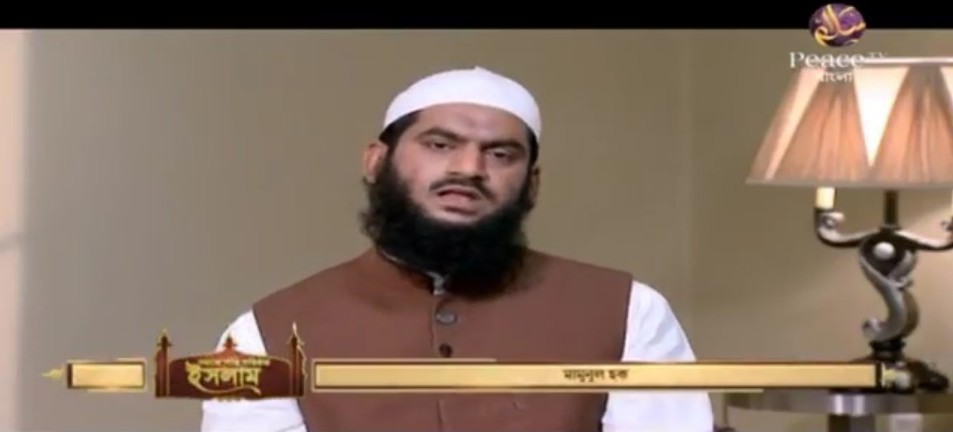
Mamunul Haque appears on Peace TV

Haque was born in November 1973 in Azimpur, Dhaka. His father, Azizul Haque, was the first Bengali translator of Sahih al-Bukhari and was widely known as Sheikh al-Hadith. He is the fourth of thirteen siblings. His early education was guided by his father, and by 1985, at the age of 12, he had completed the memorization of the Quran at Lalbagh Chantara Jame Masjid Madrasa. In 1986, he enrolled at Jamia Rahmania Arabia, where he continued his studies. He completed his higher secondary education in 1993, graduated in 1995, and earned a postgraduate degree in Hadith in 1996. Additionally, he obtained both a BA and an MA in economics from the Asian University of Bangladesh. His teaching career included positions at Sirajganj Jamia Nizamiya Bethua Madrasa and Mirpur Jamiul Uloom Madrasa, where he taught for five and two years, respectively. In 2000, he joined Jamia Rahmania as a Hadith instructor and was later appointed Sheikh al-Hadith. In 2015, he founded Mahadut Tarbiyatul Islamia, an institution dedicated to higher Islamic education, research, and training. He also served as an adjunct professor at the Asian University of Bangladesh and held the position of Khatib at Baitul Mamur Jame Masjid.

== Late 2010s activities ==
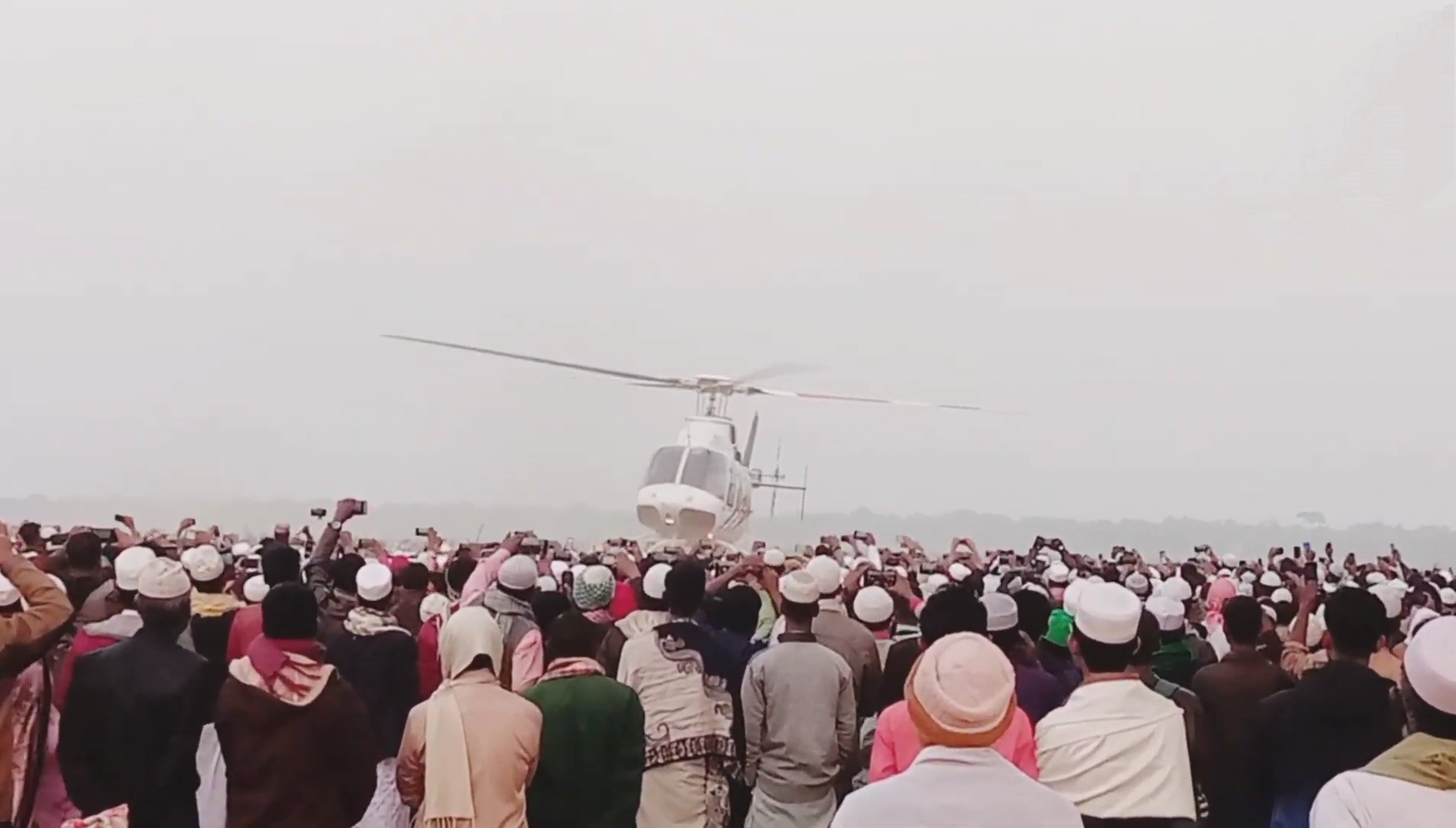
Crowd Gathers in Netrokona for Mamunul Haque's Helicopter Departure

Following the siege of Dhaka on 5 May 2013, he was arrested in Khulna on 12 May. At that time, he served as the joint secretary-general of the Dhaka metropolitan branch of Hefazat-e-Islam Bangladesh and as the president of the Bangladesh Khilafat Jubo Majlis. His arrest and subsequent months of imprisonment brought him into the national spotlight. Upon his release, his influence grew, particularly within religious circles across the country, solidifying his reputation within the grassroots of Hefazat-e-Islam. His rhetoric resonated with many young people, positioning him as a significant figure in the protest movements. On 6 April 2019, the Ministry of Home Affairs officially designated him a "controversial speaker". Later that year, on 29 September 2019, he was appointed as an advisor to Rabetatul Waizin Bangladesh, an organization representing Islamic speakers in the country. On 26 February 2020, he began the construction of a mosque called Babri Masjid Bangladesh in Keraniganj, Dhaka. Before the death of Shah Ahmad Shafi on 18 September 2020, he had established himself as a leading figure in the Junaid Babunagari faction of Hefazat-e-Islam. Subsequently, on 10 October 2020, he was elected Secretary-General of Bangladesh Khelafat Majlis, followed by his election as Joint Secretary-General of Hefazat-e-Islam on 15 November of the same year.

== Controversies ==
=== Dispute over the Sheikh Mujibur Rahman sculpture ===
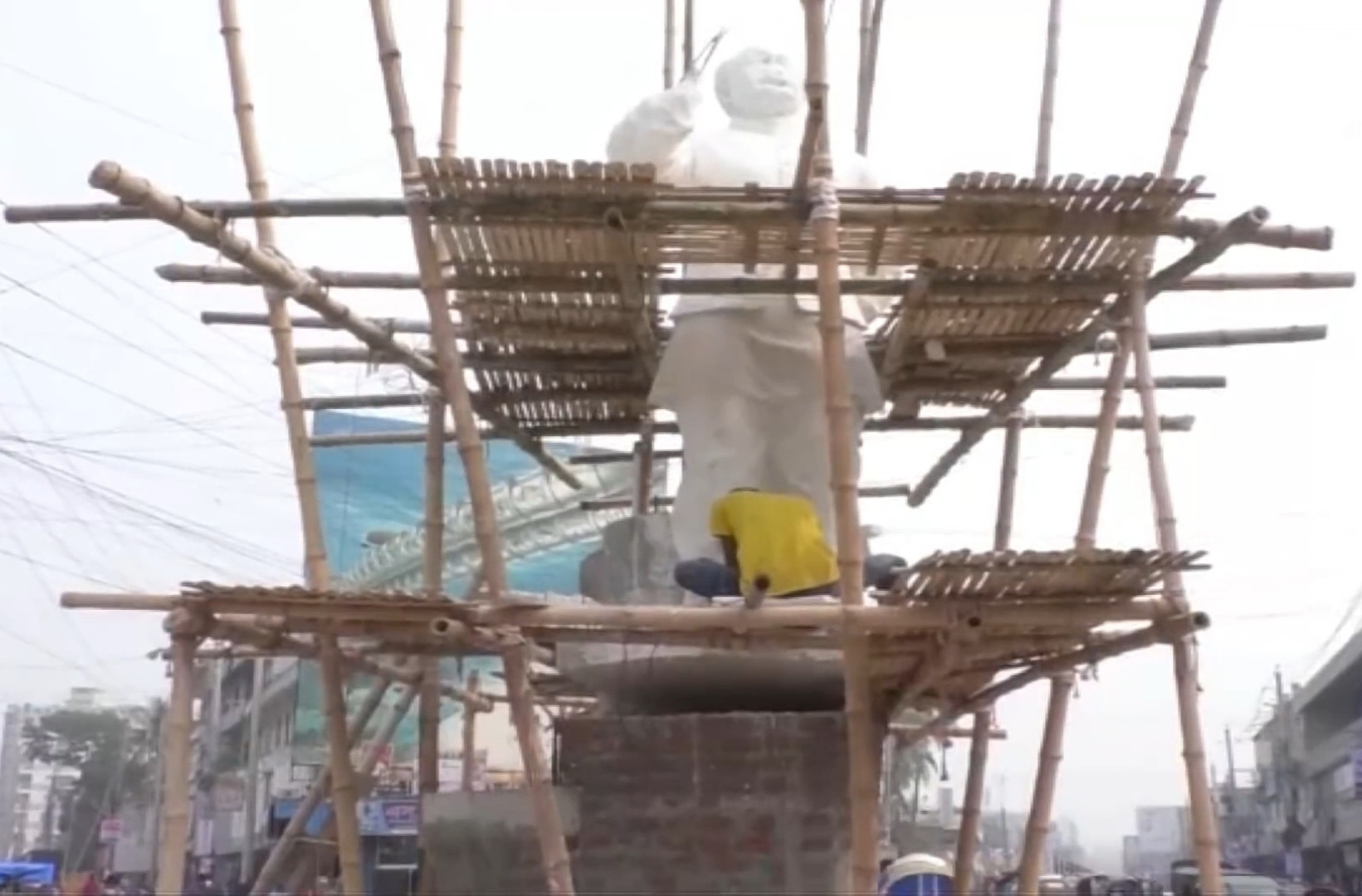
Sheikh Mujibur Rahman statue defaced by two people after Mamunul Haque's opposition

On 13 November 2020, during a conference in Dhaka, Haque condemned the construction of sculptures and idols, declaring such practices to be un-Islamic and warning that no one, including Sheikh Mujibur Rahman, should be commemorated with sculptures, which were under construction. He threatened to mobilize protests at Shapla square if necessary to prevent what he described as the "culture of idol worship." His remarks ignited a strong backlash from the ruling party, Awami League, and pro-Awami League organizations.

On 15 November, Deputy Minister of Education Nawfel, speaking at the Gol Pahar Kali temple in Chittagong, issued a pointed warning to Haque, suggesting severe consequences if he continued his rhetoric. On 16 November, the Muktijuddho Mancha issued a 72-hour ultimatum demanding Haque's arrest. When this demand was not met, the group held a protest on 21 November, burning an effigy of Haque and presenting a seven-point list of demands to the government, including his immediate arrest. The situation escalated further on 26 November when Al Nahian Khan, the president of the Bangladesh Chhatra League, led a rally in Dhaka where he labeled Haque a terrorist and issued a provocative threat against him. That same day, Nawfel, alongside members of various Awami League-affiliated groups, held a rally in Chittagong, vowing to resist Haque's activities in the district and also burned an effigy of him.

On 27 November, Haque proceeded with a planned conference in Hathazari, despite attempts by Awami League-affiliated groups to block his access to the city by surrounding Chittagong Airport and key entry points. Members of the University of Chittagong branch of the Chhatra League blocked roads for several hours and set fires in protest. However, Haque successfully reached Hathazari but later returned to Dhaka at the administration's request to avoid further conflict. Angered by the obstruction, a large number of Haque's supporters, mobilized through social media, gathered at Baitul Mukarram in Dhaka to protest. Clashes ensued when police intervened, leading to several arrests and the eventual dispersal of the crowd. The following day, on 28 November, Muktijuddho Mancha staged a one-hour siege at Shahbag, demanding Haque's arrest within 24 hours. On 30 November, Member of Parliament Nixon Chowdhury challenged Haque to confront the Jubo League if he had the courage. By 1 December, around 65 organizations gathered near Suhrawardy Udyan, demanding Haque's arrest, with Minister of Liberation War AKM Mozammel Haque warning of severe consequences if Haque did not retract his statements regarding the sculpture issue. On 3 December, a scheduled conference by Haque in Sirajganj Sadar Upazila was halted due to objections from the Awami League, and similar rallies in Brahmanbaria, Khulna, and Narail were also stopped. A 4 December attempt to hold an anti-sculpture rally in Paltan in support of Haque was thwarted by police.

On 5 December, Muktijuddho Mancha announced plans to file a sedition case against Haque, and that same night, a partially constructed sculpture of Sheikh Mujibur Rahman was vandalized in Kushtia, with the accused later confessing that they were motivated by Haque's statements. On 7 December, two sedition cases were filed against Haque, and the court directed the Police Bureau of Investigation (PBI) to investigate. Haque, speaking to BBC Bangla, stood by his statements. On 9 December, a defamation case was filed against former Prime Minister Khaleda Zia and five others for allegedly collaborating with Haque, though the court dismissed it. On 10 December, Haque faced another case under the Digital Security Act for allegedly spreading anti-sculpture rhetoric on social media, which the court redirected to the police. On 12 December, Nixon Chowdhury publicly called Haque a terrorist and threatened him, telling him to prepare for a war with him. When questioned about the sculpture vandalism, Haque described the incident as unintentional, denying that he encouraged any illegal actions. On 17 December, Haque was charged with attending a secret conference in Comilla.

He gained popularity in anti-government circles due to his strong stance on the sculpture issue. Reflecting this popularity, journalist Probhash Amin wrote in Jagonews24.com: 'Previously, Hefazat meant Shafi. Now, Hefazat means Mamunul Haque.' On 26 December 2020, Haque was appointed secretary of the Dhaka Metropolitan branch of Hefazat-e-Islam.

=== Pre and post 2021 anti-Modi protests ===
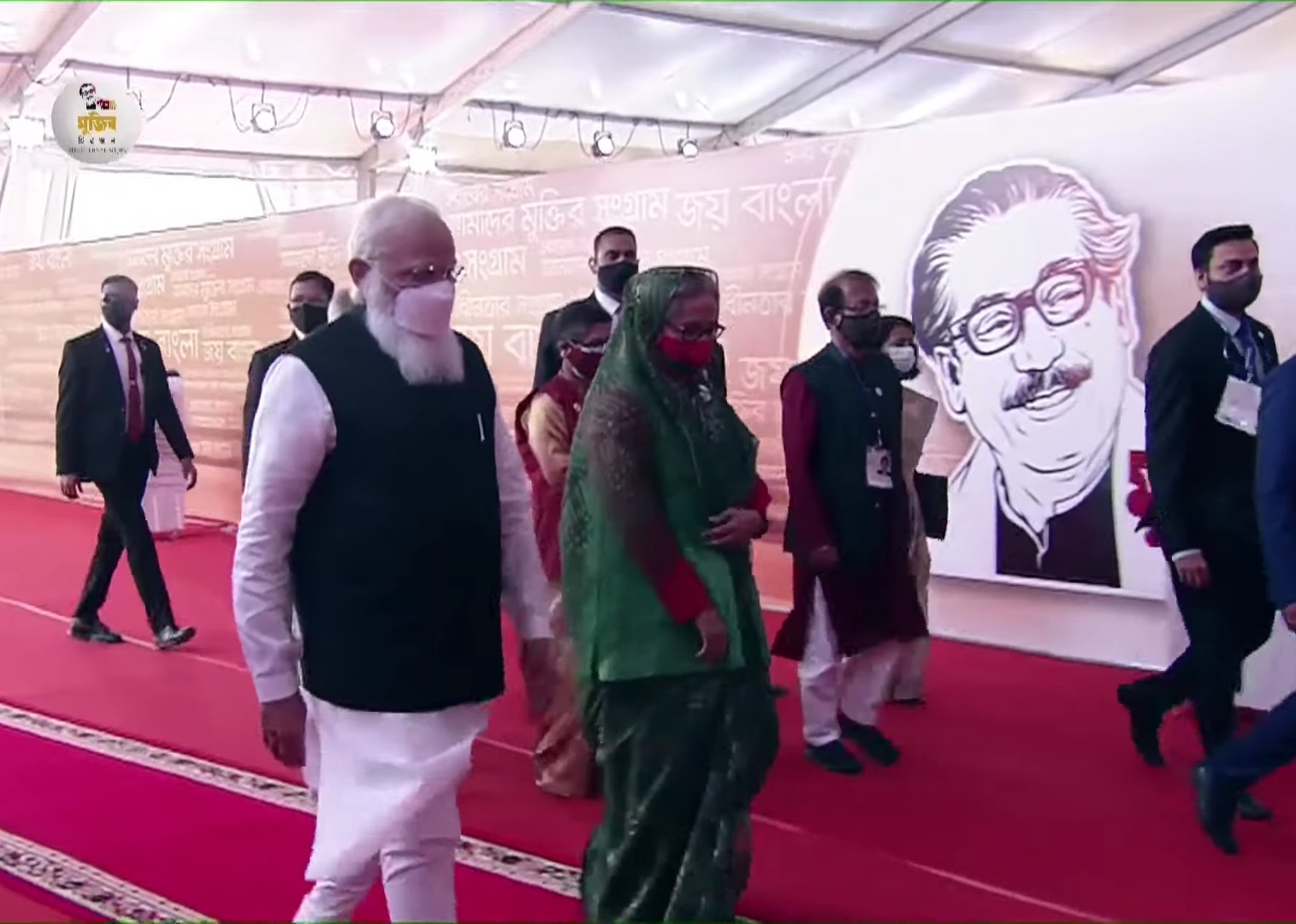
Narendra Modi's arrival in Dhaka on March 26, 2021, to honor Sheikh Mujibur Rahman's birth centenary at Sheikh Hasina's invitation

On 2 February 2021, the administration barred Mamunul Haque from attending a conference in Brahmanbaria, sparking unrest in the area. The enraged crowd set fire to sections of the highway in the Kautli and Vadughar neighborhoods and blocked the Comilla-Sylhet highway with sticks, causing severe traffic disruptions late into the night. The situation was eventually quelled when Haque arrived at the venue. On 19 February, derogatory remarks about Haque made by a resident of Moindia in the Parameshwardi union of Boalmari Upazila, incited local villagers to assault and confine him in a house in Maindia Bazar. A photograph of the individual with shoelaces tied around his hands spread on Facebook, leading to a legal case against 70 people involved. On 17 March, allegations that a Hindu youth had taunted Haque triggered violent retaliation in Sullah Upazila, where villagers vandalized 88 houses and 7 or 8 family temples belonging to the Hindu community. Despite the unrest and calls for Haque's arrest from figures like Shamsuddin Chowdhury Manik and Shahriar Kabir, no evidence linked Haque or his organization to the vandalism.

Hefazat-e-Islam launched its opposition to Indian Prime Minister Narendra Modi's visit to Bangladesh on 26 March 2021, with Mamunul Haque leading the movement. Initial unrest erupted outside the Baitul Mukarram and quickly escalated into violent clashes in Hathazari and Brahmanbaria. In response, Hefazat-e-Islam called for a nationwide strike on 28 March, which led to significant upheaval. The clashes during the strike resulted in the deaths of 17 Hefazat members, over 500 injuries, and the arrest of more than 200 individuals.

On 3 April 2021, Haque and his wife visited the Sonargaon Upazila in Narayanganj for a vacation, where they faced harassment and obstruction from supporters of the ruling Awami League. This led to Hefazat-e-Islam activists attacking the resort to rescue Haque, which subsequently triggered a series of retaliatory actions. Hefazat supporters vandalized resorts, Awami League offices, and private homes, set vehicles on fire, and blocked the Dhaka-Chittagong highway by igniting it. In response, a case was filed against Haque and 83 others for assaulting police and damaging property, with an additional 500 to 600 unnamed individuals also implicated. On 4 April, a Jubo League leader was arrested in Sunamganj for posting provocative content about Haque. An Assistant Sub-Inspector of police, who had appeared on Facebook Live to support Haque, was reassigned, and the Officer-in-Charge of Sonargaon was transferred. On 12 April, a clash in Kushtia between factions of the ruling Awami League, related to support for Haque, resulted in 25 injuries.

=== Marriage controversy and rape acquittal ===
On 3 April 2021, Haque was surrounded and detained by locals and activists of the Bangladesh Chhatra League at the Royal Tulip Sea Pearl Beach Resort in Sonargaon, Narayanganj, where he was staying with a woman named Jannat Ara Jharna. When questioned by the crowd and law enforcement, Haque claimed the woman was his second wife, married via a verbal contract, though he initially identified her by a different name. The incident triggered a nationwide controversy and circulated widely on social media, raising questions about his moral conduct.

On 30 April 2021, Jharna filed a case against Haque under the Women and Children Repression Prevention Act at the Sonargaon Police Station. In the complaint, she alleged that Haque had sexually exploited her under the guise of marriage, a charge police recorded as rape. Haque and his legal team consistently denied the allegations, maintaining that the marriage was legitimate under Islamic law and that the case was a politically motivated fabrication by the then-ruling government to malign his reputation. On 24 October 2024, the Narayanganj Women and Children Repression Prevention Tribunal acquitted Haque of the rape charges, citing a lack of credible evidence to prove the allegations.

Haque spent over three years in prison, primarily in solitary confinement at Keraniganj Central Jail. His defense team argued that the numerous cases were a strategy to keep him indefinitely detained. On 3 May 2024, following the granting of bail in the final pending cases against him, he was released from prison. His release marked his return to active politics and religious leadership in the post-Hasina political landscape.

=== Arrest and release ===
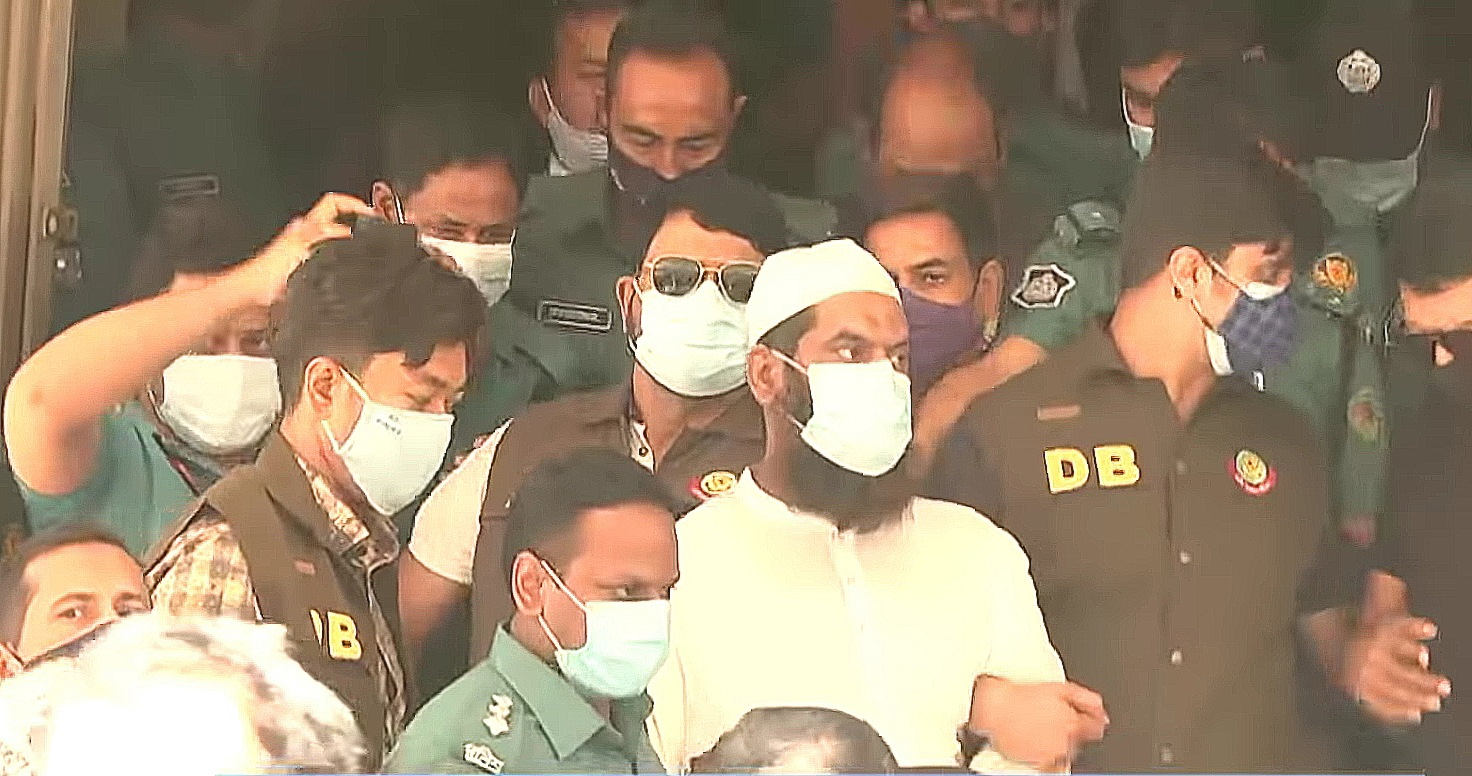
Police take Mamunul Haque to Chief Metropolitan Magistrate Court Dhaka for remand request

He was first arrested on 12 May 2013, for his role in leading the Siege of Dhaka on 5 May of that year. His second arrest took place in the lead-up to the 2018 Bangladeshi general election. On 18 April 2021, he was arrested for a third time and remained in custody for 1,110 days before being released on bail on 3 May 2024. According to BBC Bangla, there are 41 cases filed against him. His lawyer contends that these charges are politically motivated. The 18 April 2021, arrest was initially for the alleged theft of a wallet and mobile phone from within a mosque. Later, on 30 April, a rape charge was added. Additionally, he has been implicated in a murder case dating back to 2013. Following the fall of Sheikh Hasina's government, he engaged in discussions with the newly formed interim administration, seeking the withdrawal of what he claims are unfounded charges against him.

=== Advocacy for the release of Mamunul Haque ===
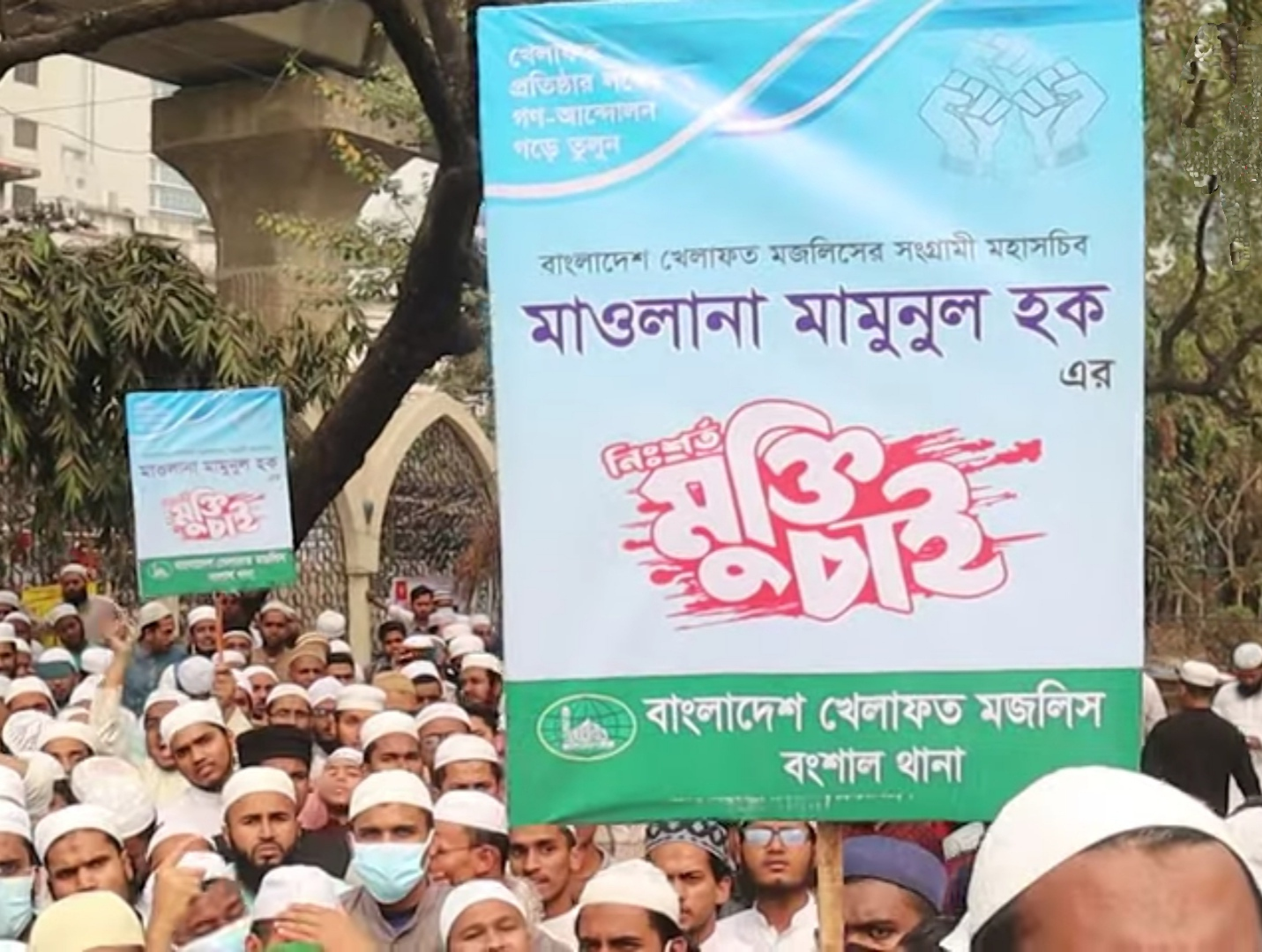
Placard reading 'Want release' for Mamunul Haque shown by Dhaka protesters

On 18 April, during a protest in Bagerhat, a mob assaulted five police officers in response to the arrest of Haque. From then on, there were widespread calls for his release from various organizations and individuals, including Hefazat-e-Islam Bangladesh and Bangladesh Khelafat Majlis. Bangladesh Nationalist Party MP Harunur Rashid raised the issue in Parliament on 16 June. Zafrullah Chowdhury threatened a blockade of the High Court with 10,000 people on 3 July, citing inhumane treatment and the denial of family visits, while Nurul Haq Nur of Gono Odhikar Parishad and Mahmudur Rahman Manna of Nagorik Oikya warned that his detention was part of a broader crackdown on Islamic scholars. Other groups like Gano Forum and AB Party also joined in these demands. The Bangladesh Khilafat Jubo Majlis organized prayers on 6 January 2023, and nationwide protests on 29 January, while Hefazat-e-Islam's Amir, Muhibbullah Babunagari, demanded his release after a 18 June meeting. As the situation escalated, Sheikh al-Hadith Parishad threatened severe action by 20 August, and Hefazat-e-Islam convened an Ulama-Mashayekh conference on 26 October, giving a 30 November ultimatum for his release. Continued efforts included a march in Dhaka on 3 November by the Bangladesh Khilafat Jubo Majlis, followed by protests on 10 November and a student rally on 8 November, culminating in a mass rally planned for 29 December by Hefazat-e-Islam. The Bangladesh Khelafat Majlis set a deadline of 17 March 2024, for stricter measures if Haque was not released before Eid, with a sit-in by the Bangladesh Khilafat Chhatra Majlis on the same day. Ultimately, Haque was released on 3 May, and in his first public speech, he vowed to continue his mission until what he described as the "flag of Allah" was raised, with Hefazat-e-Islam Bangladesh hosting a reception for him in Dhaka on 10 July.

=== Views on women's rights and social reform ===
Haque advocates for the establishment of a state governed by strict Sharia law and has opposed secular gender reform initiatives in Bangladesh. He was a prominent supporter of the Hefazat-e-Islam 2013 13-point demand charter, which called for the introduction of the death penalty for blasphemy, a ban on the "free mixing of sexes," and restrictions on women's movement and public conduct.

Following the fall of the Awami League government in 2024, Haque opposed initiatives undertaken by the interim government's Women's Affairs Reform Commission. In 2025, he participated in a nationwide movement calling for the commission's dissolution. He described proposals including equal inheritance rights for women, a total ban on polygamy, and the criminalization of marital rape as contrary to Islamic principles and influenced by Western secularism. At a rally in Dhaka on 3 May 2025, he stated that the commission's report was inconsistent with Islamic teachings and argued that women's roles should be defined according to religious tradition.

Haque has also publicly supported the introduction of a national blasphemy law providing for capital punishment, stating that the matter is non-negotiable. His positions on gender reform and blasphemy legislation have been criticized by human rights organizations and secular activists as discriminatory and detrimental to women's constitutional rights.

=== Relations with the Taliban ===
Haque has expressed ideological support for the Taliban movement, describing their governance in Afghanistan as a model for Islamic rule. Following the Fall of Kabul in 2021, he publicly praised the movement, prompting concern from law enforcement and secular groups over potential "Talibanization" of Bangladesh.

In September 2025, Haque led a delegation of seven Bangladeshi Islamic scholars to Kabul at the formal invitation of the Taliban government. During the week-long visit, the delegation met with senior Taliban officials to discuss religious education and bilateral ties. Upon his return, Haque praised the Taliban's administrative structure, describing it as a "rule-based society" governed by "Islamic discipline."

In December 2025, Noor Ahmad Noor, a Director General at the Taliban's Ministry of Foreign Affairs, visited Bangladesh and met with Haque at his madrassa in Dhaka. Haque confirmed the meeting to international media, describing it as a private visit focused on religious seminaries and the exchange of educational ideas. Critics and secular activists have described these exchanges as attempts to introduce "Taliban-style" policies and religious extremism into Bangladesh's political landscape.

== Literary works ==
Debut cover of Speaking from Prison, published by Bishokollan Publications

He serves as the editor of Rahmani Paigam, a monthly magazine published in Dhaka and established by Azizul Haque in the late 1990s. During his imprisonment, he authored the book Speaking from Prison, which was released in September 2013. His other publications include The Essence of Time, Scholars' Contributions to the Struggle for Freedom, An Introduction to the Caliphate System, Clarifying Misconceptions and the Fourth Clause of Hefazat-e-Islam's Women's Rights, Islamic Perspectives on the First Baisakh, Pathways to a Successful Life, Understanding Islamic Organizations and Their Purpose, The Islamic Movement: An Overview, and The Attributes of a Successful Believer.

== Post July Uprising ==
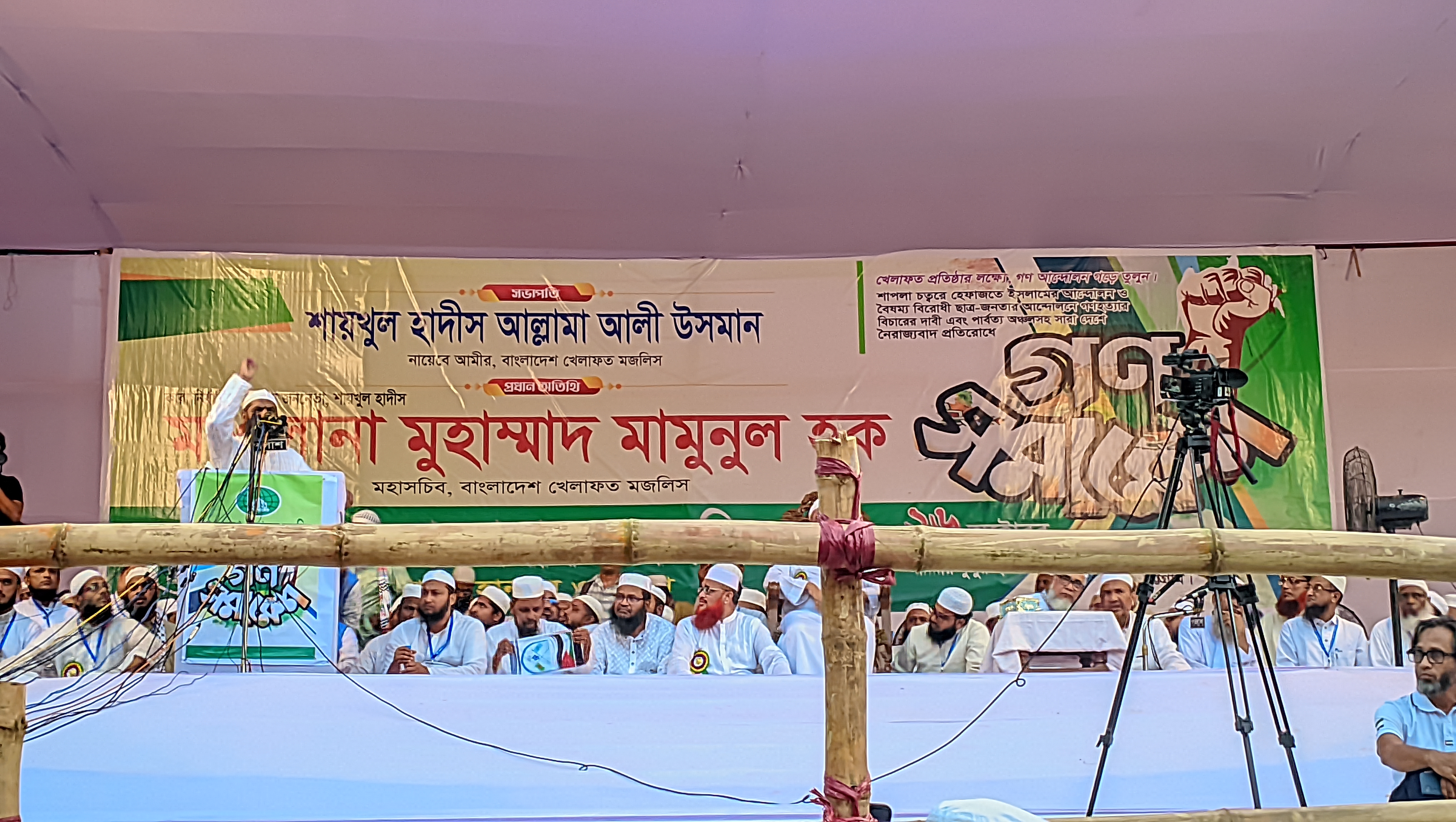
Mamunul Haque leading a Mass Rally of Bangladesh Khelafat Majlis at Chittagong's Laldighi Ground.

Mamunul Haque honored with "National Hero" title at 85th International Islamic Conference of Al Jamia Al Islamia Patiya.

He expressed support for students during the quota reform movement and, on 3 August, called for the resignation of the Sheikh Hasina government following the deaths of students, accusing it of authoritarianism. He claimed that the people had united against what he described as a fascist regime, which reportedly weakened when Sheikh Hasina left for India amid the August 5 protests. After the government's fall, he met with the Chief of Army Staff and later with the President to discuss forming an interim government, stating that the President had assumed leadership with military support. He described the post-Hasina period as the nation's "second independence". On 7 August, he met with former Prime Minister Khaleda Zia, and the next day, the Yunus ministry was established, with A F M Khalid Hossain joining as a representative of Hefazat-e-Islam. He called for Sheikh Hasina to be brought back for trial and urged other nations not to offer her refuge. On 31 August, during discussions with the interim head Muhammad Yunus demanded an investigation into the Shapla Square massacre under the previous regime and called for the dismissal of cases against leaders of aligned parties, including Hefazat-e-Islam, within a month. He emphasized the need for timely elections and proposed reforms, including broad voter representation in national elections, reallocating parliamentary seats based on vote percentages, and restructuring the Bangladesh Election Commission with impartial individuals. Additionally, he proposed decentralizing the Prime Minister's power, limiting the Prime Minister's tenure to two terms, ensuring judicial independence through a Judicial Council, reforming the education system to align with Islamic principles, and keeping the Bangladesh Police and administration free from government control. He also advocated against enacting laws or policies that conflict with the Quran and Sunnah. During a speech marking the one-month anniversary of the fall of the Sheikh Hasina regime, he criticized the 1972 constitution, describing it as not representing the will of the common people and as having been imposed by India. He argued that the current constitution, which he called a "constitution of slavery," would not suffice in a free country. He insisted that a new constitution should reflect the aspirations and intentions of the majority of the population. In another gathering, he stated that the ultimate goal of this "August revolution" would be the establishment of Islamic principles in Bangladesh, which he believed would lead to the revolution's success. On 20 September, he issued a 24-hour ultimatum to Information Advisor Nahid Islam to address the restrictions placed on him on YouTube and Facebook. On 26 September, he called for the expulsion of atheists, apostates, and leftist members from the 10-member coordination committee formed by the Ministry of Education on 15 September, advocating for the inclusion of Islamic educators to facilitate the textbook revision process. On the 100th anniversary of the fall of the Ottoman Caliphate, he remarked that the event was not just a political loss but a significant blow to the unity of the Muslim Ummah, lamenting that the Muslim world had been leaderless for a century. On 1 October, he was interviewed by Bangla Tribune, where he discussed a broad range of topics, including the Qawmi Madrasa certificate, the 24 Uprising, the participation of Qawmi Madrasa students in the movement, contemporary Islamic politics, future aspirations, his arrest, current political challenges, ideological distinctions, religious content in textbooks, attacks on Hindu communities, the destruction of religious shrines, and the Royal Resort incident. On 5 October, he met again with interim head Muhammad Yunus and warned him about ongoing conspiracies. That same day, the Awami League-linked committee dismissed a Chapai Nawabganj imam for criticizing the regime's treatment of Mamunul Haque in a sermon. He urged the political parties, students, and the public to remain united in opposition to fascism, stating that their solidarity should be as strong as a "lead wall." On 23 October, he pressed the interim government to announce an election roadmap promptly. On 29 November, he accused ISKCON of collaborating with India and the Awami League, alleging their involvement in lawyer Saiful Islam's murder in Chittagong, while demanding a ban on the organization and justice for the killing. On 4 December, he participated in an all-party meeting with Muhammad Yunus, where he discussed strategies to address India's regional policies and advocated for stronger alliances with Bangladesh's regional partners to resist Indian actions and foreign policy. On 12 December, he stated that no national elections could take place in Bangladesh without addressing past incidents of violence, disappearances, and killings over the preceding 16 years, including those linked to the Student–People's uprising. On 18 December, a young man was arrested for posting a disrespectful comment about Haque on Facebook. That same day, he held the Saad Kandhlawi faction of the Tablighi Jamaat responsible for a clash in Tongi that left four dead and called for the faction to be banned. On 11 January 2025, he was elected Amir of Bangladesh Khelafat Majlis, with Jalaluddin Ahmad succeeding him as Secretary-General. In April 2025, Haque strongly opposed the recommendations of the Women's Affairs Reform Commission, established by the interim government, which proposed reforms such as altering Islamic inheritance laws, recognizing sex work, and identifying religion as a source of gender discrimination. Haque condemned the report as offensive to the religious sentiments of the majority Muslim population and demanded its suspension and legal action against those responsible. On 25 May, he met with the Chief Adviser to express concerns about the slow progress of government reforms, demanded transparency, and called for visible judicial action against former officials for past political violence. He also urged that decisions regarding strategic infrastructure projects like ports be made in consultation with political stakeholders. On 28 May, during a seminar organized by several BNP-affiliated groups, Haque advised BNP leaders to avoid confrontation with Islamist factions and to promote cooperation in future political initiatives.

== See also ==
- List of Deobandis
