= Ataullah Hafezzi =

Bangladeshi Islamist leader and politician

Ameer-e-Shariah Ataullah Hafezzi
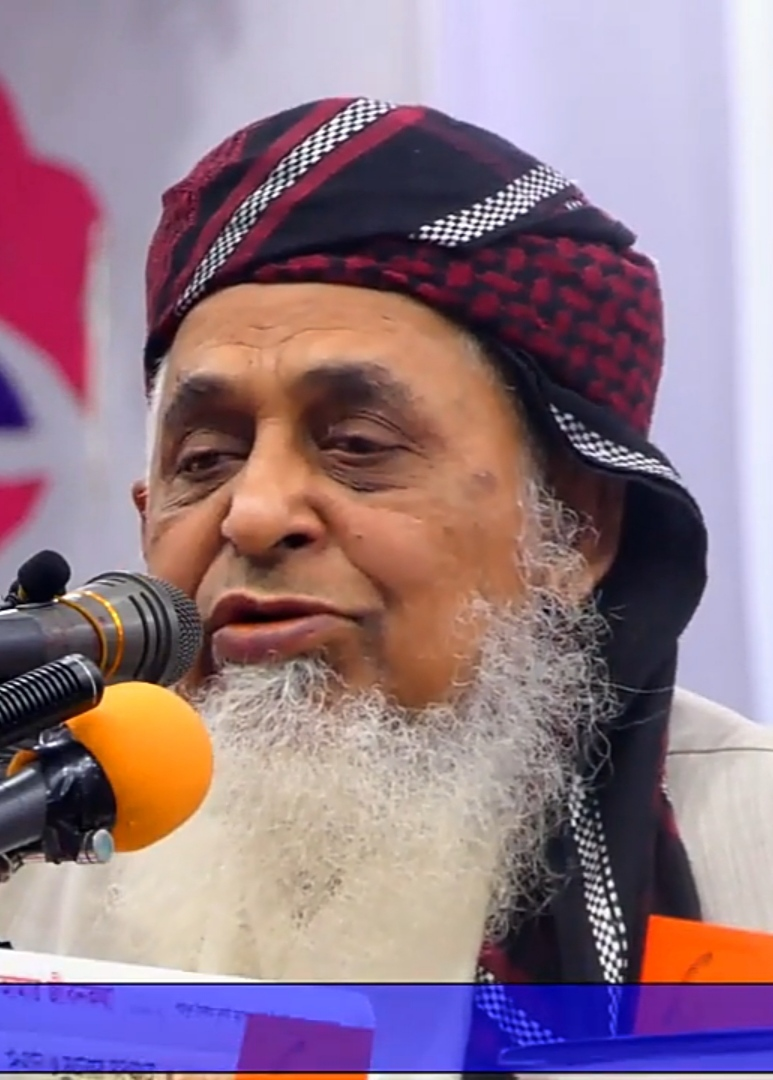

3rd Ameer, Bangladesh Khilafat Andolan
- In office 29 November 2014 – 4 April 2025
- Preceded by: Ahmadullah Ashraf

Personal details
- Born: 10 January 1948 Ludhua, Raipur Upazila, Noakhali District, East Bengal, Pakistan
- Died: 4 April 2025 (aged 77)
- Party: Bangladesh Khilafat Andolan
- Parent: Muhammadullah Hafezzi (father)

Ataullah Hafezzi (Bengali: আতাউল্লাহ হাফেজ্জী; 10 January 1948 – 4 April 2025) was a Deobandi Islamist leader and politician who served as the Ameer (Head) of the Bangladesh Khilafat Andolan, Naeeb-e-Ameer (vice-head) of the Hefazat-e-Islam Bangladesh, director of Jamia Nooria Islamia, and the chief Khatib of Ambarshah Shahi Jam'a Mosque.

== Biography ==
His political career started with the Bangladesh Khilafat Andolan, a party founded by his father. He served as one of the central leaders of Islami Oikya Jote and led the Islamic Law Implementation Committee. In 2014, he was nominated as the Ameer of Bangladesh Khilafat Andolan and elected in 2023.

In 2015, he was appointed Muhtamim of Jamia Nuria Islamia.

Hafezzi led several notable protests, including those against the demolition of the Babri Masjid in 1992, Taslima Nasreen in 1994, and the publication of cartoons deemed offensive in 2007. He was involved in movements opposing secularism, leading protests under both Khilafat Andolan and Hefazat-e-Islam. He also led it under the banner of Hefazat. He died on 4 April 2025, at the age of 77.

== See also ==
- List of Deobandis
