= Nurul Haque Miah =

Professor at Dhaka College (1944–2021)

Professor Muhammad Nurul Haque Mia
- মোহম্মদ নুরুল হক মিঞা
- Born: 1 July 1944; Sreepur, Gazipur District, Bengal Presidency
- Died: 20 February 2021 (aged 76); Azimpur, Dhaka, Bangladesh
- Resting place: Ghatarchar, Keraniganj
- Education: University of Dhaka
- Era: Modern
- Known for: Professor, textbook composition
- Children: Enamul Haque; Ehsanul Haque
- Parents: Elahi Bakhsh (father); Salemunnesa (mother)
- Relatives: Azizul Haque (father-in-law); Mahfuzul Haque (brother-in-law); Mamunul Haque (brother-in-law)

Muhammad Nurul Haque Miah (Bengali: মোহম্মদ নুরুল হক মিঞা; 1 July 1944 — 20 February 2021) was a professor at Dhaka College and the head of its Department of Chemistry. He is renowned for writing high school and degree textbooks.

== Early life and education ==
Muhammad Nurul Haque Miah was born on 1 July 1944 to a Bengali Muslim family in Sreepur, Gazipur. His father was Elahi Bakhsh and mother was Salemunnesa. He studied chemistry at the University of Dhaka, and among his classmates were Mohammad Abdur Razzaque and Tofail Ahmed. He graduated in 1967.

== Career ==
Miah's career began in 1969, where he was employed as a teacher at the Jagannath University. Subsequently, he worked as professor at Murari Chand College, Ananda Mohan College, Saadat College, Dhaka Science College and Dhaka College. He was the head of chemistry at Dhaka College for four years, and served as acting-principal in 2001. M. Zahid Hasan was one of his notable students.

He became prominent in Bangladesh for writing books relating to chemistry. He has written 6 books for higher secondary and degree classes. His textbooks were the only ones which were available from 1983 to 1999.

== Personal life ==
Miah has been associated with the Tablighi Jamaat since his student life. He is married to the daughter of Islamic scholar Azizul Haque. He has two sons and six daughters, all of whom have memorised the Qur'an off by heart. His two sons, Enamul Haque and Ehsanul Haque, are teachers at the Jamia Rahmania Arabia madrasa in Dhaka.

== Death ==
On 20 February 2021, Miah died in his own home in Azimpur at the age of 76.
