= Azizul Haque (scholar, born 1919) =

Sunni scholar & politician (1919–2012)

- আজিজুল হক
- Shaykh Ul Hadith Allamah Azizul Haque
- Title: First Ameer Bangladesh Khelafat Majlis - Shaykh al-Hadith

Personal life
- Born: 1919 Louhajang, Bikrampur, Bengal Presidency, British Raj
- Died: 8 August 2012 (aged 92–93) Azimpur, Dhaka, Bangladesh
- Children: Mamunul Haque; Mahfuzul Haque
- Citizenship: British Indian (1919–1947); Pakistani (1947–1971); Bangladeshi (1971–2012)
- Main interests: Hadith studies; Islamic Jurisprudence; Tafsir; Islamic economic jurisprudence; Politics and Islam
- Notable works: Translation of Sahih al-Bukhari into Bengali; Establishment of Jamia Rahmania Arabia Dhaka
- Occupation: Muhaddith
- Relatives: Nurul Haque Miah (son-in-law)

Religious life
- Religion: Islam
- Denomination: Sunni
- Jurisprudence: Hanafi
- Movement: Deobandi

Muslim leader
- Teacher: Shamsul Haque Faridpuri; Hafezzi Huzur; Abdul Wahhab Pirji; Zafar Ahmad Usmani; Shabbir Ahmad Usmani; Muhammad Idris Kandhlawi
- Influenced: Sultan Zauq Nadvi

Azizul Haque (Bengali: আজিজুল হক) (1919 - 8 August 2012), also known as by his epithet Shaykh al-Hadith was a Bangladeshi Islamic scholar, politician, writer, and translator. He is the founder of Bangladesh Khelafat Majlis and first Bangali translator of Sahih al-Bukhari. He was vice chancellor of Jamia Rahmania Arabia.

== Early life and education ==
Azizul Haque was born in 1919, into a Bengali Muslim family of Qadis in the village of Bhirich Khan, Louhajang, Bikrampur, Bengal Presidency (now in Munshiganj District, Bangladesh). His father was Haji Ershad Ali, and Haque lost his mother when he was only 4–5 years old. He was then raised by his maternal grandmother in the nearby village of Kalma, where he began his initial primary education at the local mosque.

At the age of 7, Haque moved to Brahmanbaria with his father, who had a business there. Haque enrolled at the Jamia Islamia Yunusia, where he spent four years studying under Shamsul Haque Faridpuri, Hafezzi Huzur and Abdul Wahhab Pirji, who his father had close connections with. His father placed Haque under the care of Faridpuri. In 1931, he followed Faridpuri to the newly established Ashraful Uloom Madrasa in Bara Katara, Dhaka where he studied for twelve years. From 1940 to 1941, Haque studied books such as Tafsir al-Baydawi, Jami' al-Tirmidhi and Sahih al-Bukhari under Zafar Ahmad Usmani. Haque had completed his Master of Arts in Hadith studies in Ashraful Uloom.

He travelled to North India in 1943 for further Islamic studies. He started off at the Jamiah Islamiah Talimuddin in Dabhel near Surat, Gujarat where he studied under Shabbir Ahmad Usmani. Finally he went to Darul Uloom Deoband in Saharanpur where he studied Tafsir, pursuing a degree from Muhammad Idris Kandhlawi. Haque was fluent in the Bengali, Urdu and Arabic languages.

== Career ==
Haque began his career as a teacher in the Ashraful Uloom Madrasa in Bara Katara, Dhaka in 1946 and continued to 1952. He then taught Sahih al-Bukhari and other Islamic texts at the Jamia Qurania Arabia in Lalbagh Thana until 1985.

In 1978, he played a key role in establishing the Bangladesh Qawmi Madrasah Education Board, becoming its general secretary. In 1979, he taught Sahih al-Bukhari in the Department of Islamic Studies of University of Dhaka as a visiting professor and served there for three years.

In 1986, Haque established a Madrasah called Jamiah Muhammadia Arabia near Mohammadpur, Dhaka. In 1988, he purchased a piece of land near Saat Masjid in Mohammadpur and transferred the Jamiah Muhammadia Arabia there renaming it to Jamia Rahmania Arabia Dhaka. For a long tenure, he was the chief Sheikhul Hadith of this institution. He served as the principal of Jamia Shariyyah Malibagh, Dhaka.

=== Political career ===
He served as the Amir of the Islami Oikya Jote and Bangladesh Khelafat Majlish. He was present at the launch of Harkat-ul-Jihad al-Islami Bangladesh in the National Press Club of Bangladesh in 1992.

As a result of the 1992 Demolition of the Babri Masjid in Ayodhya, India, Azizul Haque led the Khelafat Majlis in a march from Dhaka to Ayodhya on 2 January 1993, demanding its restoration. They reached the border near Khulna, where the Government of Bangladesh blocked off the boundaries and suppressed the march. In the same year, Azizul Haque declared on behalf of the Majlis that India's prime minister Narasimha Rao should not visit India and gave orders to besiege the national airport. He was coincidentally arrested for this reason on 9 April 1993, though he was later released on 8 May 1993.

He also served as the chairman of the Shari'ah Board of Al-Arafah Islami Bank Limited.

== Views ==
In 2009, Azizul Haque and other Bengali Muslim scholars wrote a statement to the Prime Minister, Sheikh Hasina, condemning terrorism and militancy committed in the name of Islam.

== Works ==
- Bengali translation and explanations of Sahih al-Bukhari.
- In student life, he wrote an Urdu explanation of Sahih al-Bukhari. This big book of 1800 pages was published from Pakistan by the name of Fazl al-Bari Sharh-e-Bukhari.
- Bengali translation of Masnavi-e-Rumi.
- Capitalism, Socialism and Islam
- Refutation of Kadianism
- Munajat-e-Maqbul including Masnun Dua (Translation).
- Struggle in the way of Truth (Lecture Collection).

== Death and legacy ==
Azizul Haque died on 8 August 2012 at his home in Azimpur, Dhaka at the age of 94. He was survived by his wife, eight daughters and five sons. His son, Mamunul Haque, is a leader of Hefazat-e-Islam Bangladesh. Sheikh Hasina expressed shock and highlighted Haque's contributions to the Bangladeshi society. President Zillur Rahman and opposition leader Begum Khaleda Zia expressed condolences.

== See more ==
- List of Deobandis
