= Bangladesh Khilafat Andolan =

Far-right political party in Bangladesh

Bangladesh Khilafat Andolan বাংলাদেশ খেলাফত আন্দোলন
- Abbreviation: BKA
- Leader: Habibullah Mianji
- Secretary-General: Yousuf Sadeq Haqqani
- Founder: Muhammadullah Hafezzi
- Founded: November 29, 1981; 44 years ago
- Headquarters: Kellar Mor, Lalbagh Thana, Dhaka
- Ideology: Islamism; Panislamism; Islamic fundamentalism Social conservatism Anti-Atlanticism; Anti-Zionism; Anti-Communism
- Political position: Far-right
- National affiliation: 11 Party Alliance (2025–2026)
- Colors: Yellow-Green
- Bangladesh Parliament: 0 / 350

Election symbol
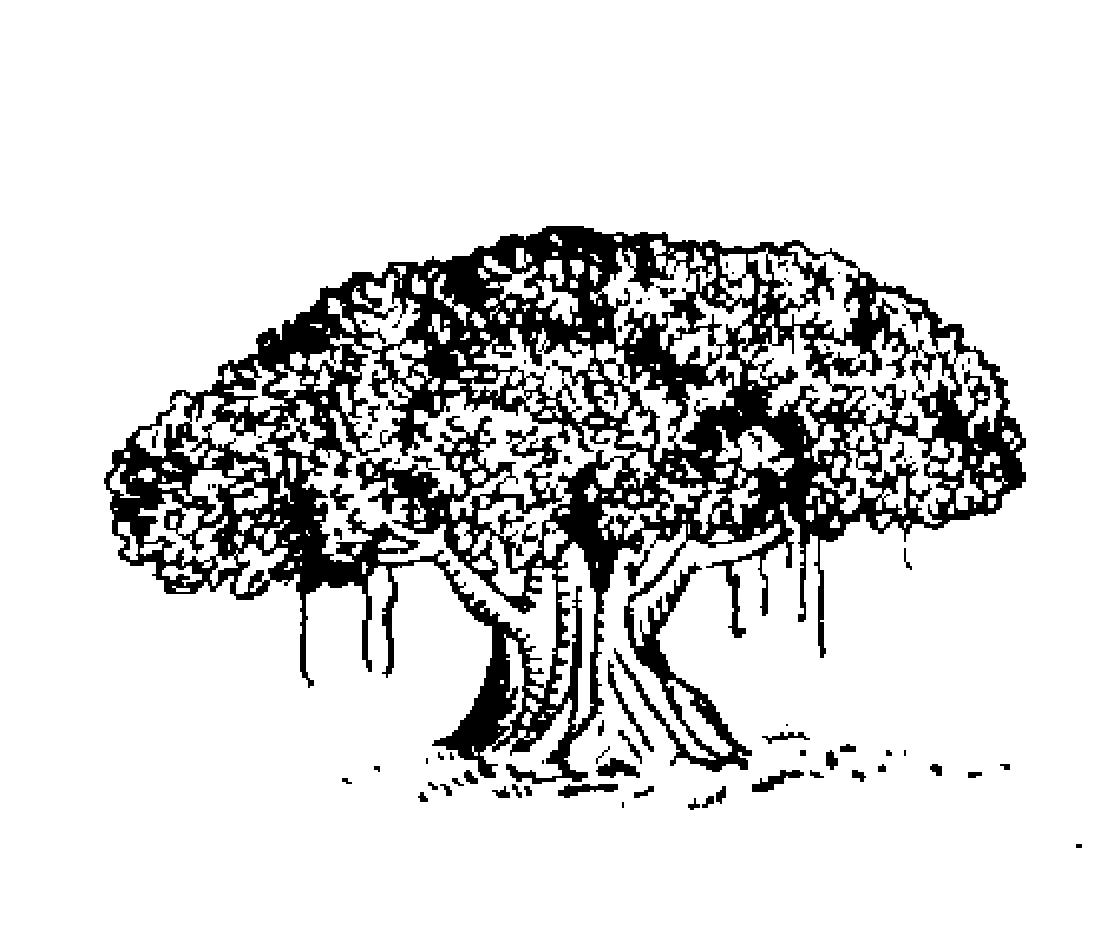
- Banyan Tree

Party flag

Website
- khelafatandolon.org

Bangladesh Khilafat Andolan (Bengali: বাংলাদেশ খেলাফত আন্দোলন, lit. 'Bangladesh Caliphate Movement') is an Islamist political party in Bangladesh, founded by Hafezzi Huzur after the 1981 Bangladeshi presidential election. Hafezzi Huzur had been a presidential candidate in 1981. He came third, scoring 387,215 votes (1.79%). His candidacy was supported by the Islamic Republican Party and Bangladesh Justice Party.

The support of the party is largely confined to conservative sectors of ulema. The amir of the party is Habibullah Mianji and the general secretary is Yousuf Sadeq Haqqani.

== History ==
The party was established on 29 November 1981 by the Islamic scholar Muhammadullah Hafezzi, following the 1981 Bangladeshi presidential election, in which Hafezzi was an independent candidate. His student, Azizul Haque, was appointed as the chief spokesperson of the party. Hafezzi contested in the 1986 Bangladeshi presidential election, reaching second place.

After the death of Hafezzi on 7 May 1987, his eldest son Ahmadullah Ashraf became the next amir of the party. On 22 December 1990, the Andolan joined the Islami Oikya Jote; a political alliance of six Islamic parties founded by Khelafat Majlish leader Azizul Haque. Leading the party for 27 years, Ashraf stepped down as amir on 29 November 2014 and was succeeded by his younger brother Ataullah Hafezzi.

== Views ==
The programme of Bangladesh Khilafat Andolan includes introduction of the principles of the Qur'an and Sunnah in the construction of the state, reorientation of the judicial system towards Sharia law, islamization of the educational system, reorganisation of Zakat and waqfs, etc. The party is staunchly opposed to US occupation of Iraq and Afghanistan, and has participated in many rallies and protests on the issue. In June 2004, ahead of a visit to Bangladesh by Donald Rumsfeld, the party issued a statement calling him a "perpetrator of genocide in Iraq and Afghanistan, a war criminal, enemy of mankind and Allah".

== See also ==
- List of Deobandi organisations
