= Islami Oikya Jote =

Bangladeshi political party

Islami Oikya Jote ইসলামী ঐক্য জোট
- Abbreviation: IOJ
- President: Maulana Abdul Qadir
- Secretary-General: Mufti Sakhawat Hossain Razi
- Founded: 22 December 1990
- Headquarters: Lalbagh, Dhaka
- Student wing: Bangladesh Islami Chatra Khelafat
- Ideology: Islamism; Islamic fundamentalism
- Political position: Far-right
- Bangladesh Parliament: 0 / 300

Election symbol
- Tower

The Islami Oikya Jote (Bengali: ইসলামী ঐক্য জোট, romanized: Islami Oikko Joţ, lit. 'Islamic Unity Alliance'), is a far-right Islamist political party in Bangladesh. It was allied with the former Four Party Alliance. It was originally founded in 1990 as an alliance of six Islamist parties, it later transitioned into a standalone registered political party after its founding members gradually departed from the alliance.

== History ==
The Islami Oikya Jote was formed on 22 December 1990, mainly to contest in the 1991 Bangladeshi general election.

In the 1991 elections, the Islami Oikya Jote candidate Obaidul Haque won a seat in Sylhet-5 by running under the electoral symbol of the Islami Oikya Jote tower. He was the leader of the partner party Bangladesh Khelafat Majlis.

Before the 2001 Bangladeshi general election, following ideological clashes between leaders, the alliance split into factions. One group, led by Mufti Fazlul Haque Amini, retained the symbol of the alliance and joined the BNP's Four Party Alliance, while the other group went with the Awami League. During the legislative elections of 1 October 2001, the alliance won 2 out of 300 elected members in an alliance with the Bangladesh Nationalist Party (BNP) under the Sheaf of Paddy. It was led by Fazlul Haque Amini and Azizul Haq. It won another 2 seats under the alliance's "tower" electoral symbol.

Since then, with every national election, the split in the original alliance continued to branch out. The original coalition eventually fractured into six separate groups.

In 2008, the Mufti Amini-led faction of the Islami Oikya Jote again sided with the BNP and contested only four seats.

In 2013, the party called upon its community and supporters to sever ties with atheists and "the enemies of Islam" and to take it out in the streets to foil conspiracies against Islam, specifically calling on the media not to associate this announcement with any other Islamic party whatsoever. A 2015 article in the journal Prothom Alo stated that the party had been inactive in recent years. The spokesperson of the party said most of their activity happens over the phone.

In 2014, the party boycotted the 2014 Bangladeshi general election, along with the BNP-led 20 Party Alliance (formerly the Four Party Alliance).

In January 2016, the Islami Oikya Jote split again. Chairman Abdul Latif Nezami announced "we have no relation with the 20-party alliance. The Islami Oikya Jote will compete in all 300 seats in the next election". But a few hours later, a faction of the Islamist party declared that it would remain with the BNP-led coalition.

In April 2016, the Islami Oikya Jote congratulated the Prime Minister Sheikh Hasnia's decision to lash out the atheist bloggers participating in the 2013 Shahbag protests. In July 2016, a faction of the party accused the Jamaat-e-Islami of being behind the recent terrorist attacks in Bangladesh.

In March 2017, the Islami Oikya Jote expressed its desire to see all Islamic parties run independently for the 2019 elections in Bangladesh. In 2017, the party repeatedly warned that all non-Islamic idols must be banned from public places, including the Lady Justice statue in front of the Supreme Court. In July 2017, Islami Oikya Jote formed a short-lived alliance of Islamic parties to weigh against the Jamaat-e-Islami.

In 2018, Islami Oikya Jote formed an alliance with the ruling Awami League. However, the party was not allowed to use the AL boat symbol in the 2018 Bangladeshi general election.

In November 2025, internal factionalism surfaced during an Election Commission meeting ahead of the 2026 Bangladeshi general election. Two rival delegations attempted to attend the meeting. Election Commission officials asked Amini's faction to leave after it failed to present a hard copy of the official invitation letter, proceeding with Razi's delegation instead.

== Founding Members ==
The alliance was formed by six Islamist parties of that time.

1. Bangladesh Khelafat Majlis
2. Bangladesh Khilafat Andolan
3. Nizam-e-Islam Party
4. Islami Shasantantra Andolan (present-day Islami Andolan Bangladesh)
5. Jamiat Ulema-e-Islam Bangladesh
6. Faraizi movement

== Student wing ==
The student wing of Islami Oikya Jote is the Islami Chhatra Khelafat. They took part in the 2013 Shapla Square protests in support of Hefazat-e-Islam Bangladesh.

== Leaders ==
Mufti Fazlul Huq Amini and Azizul Haq were the two most influential leaders of the party. Fayez Ullah was the General secretary for 2013–2024.

== See also ==
- List of Deobandi organisations
- List of political parties in Bangladesh
- List of Islamic political parties
