= Jamia Qurania Arabia Lalbagh =

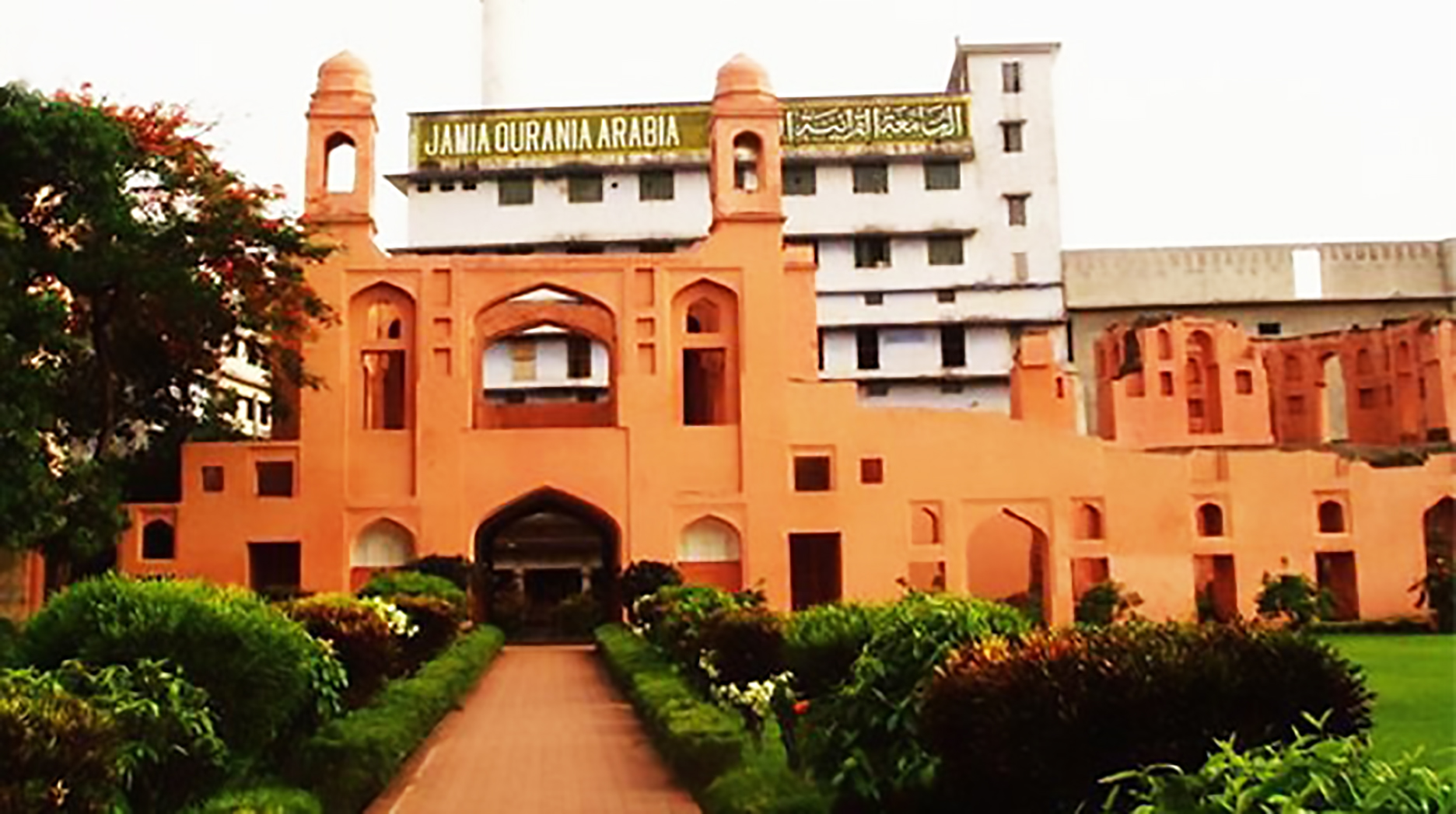
- Type: Islamic university
- Established: 1950 (1370 Hijri)
- Chancellor: Majlise Shura (Advisory Council)
- Academic staff: 52
- Students: 1200 (total)
- Location: Lalbagh, Dhaka, Bangladesh
- Campus: Urban
- Language: Bangla, Urdu, Arabic
- Website: http://www.lalbaghjamia.com/

Al-Jāmiʿah al-Qurʼāniyyah al-ʿArabiyyah Lālbāgh (Arabic: الجامعة القرآنية العربية لالباغ), better known simply as Lalbagh Madrasah (Bengali: লালবাগ মাদ্রাসা), is a Qawmi madrasa providing higher Islamic studies in Dhaka, Bangladesh It has seven education sections from kindergarten to post-graduate levels.

== History ==
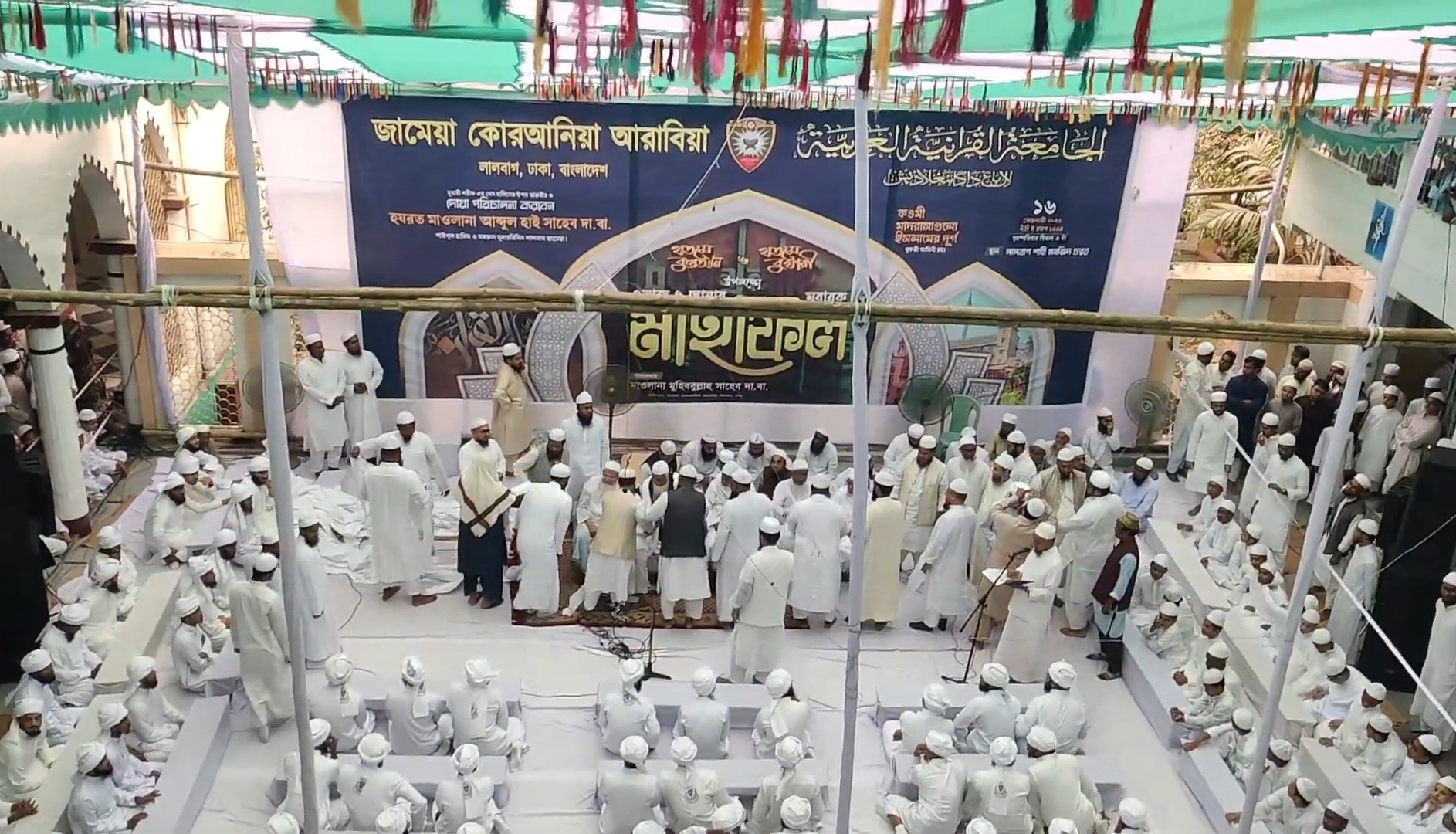
Khatm-e-Bukhari Ceremony 2023

This institute was founded by a group of Islamic scholars led by Zafar Ahmad Usmani, Shamsul Haque Faridpuri, Deen Muhammad Khan and Hafezzi Huzur. They planned for the establishment of this seminary around the historic Lalbagh Fort in Shawwal 1370 H (1950 CE). Hafezzi Huzur was the first person who started the class of memorizing the Quran (hifz) amid a lot of difficulties and problems. However, due to the effort of those personalities, the madrasa has now become well known internationally. Jamiah Lalbagh looks after around 70 madrasahs of this area so that they can improve their curricular activities.

== Library and publications ==
- The University Library has a large stock of books of Islamic history, Islamic Philosophy, text books of different levels, Journals, Magazines etc. in Arabic, Bengali, Urdu, Persian and English languages. The approximate number of books in this library is about 22,000.
- Fatwa-E-Jamia: The Madrasah has responsibilities for issues of society. It gives accurate advice and legal opinions for those issues the aggregate of which are published as a book called Fatwa-e-Jamiah. Currently 12 volumes have been published.

== Facilities ==
All the students are residents of the madrasah. The Jamiah gives free education to all students. It also lends them textbooks. Those students who attain an excellent result in the examination are rewarded. Moreover, the Jamiah provides orphans and poor and distressed students with food and accommodation.

== Alumni ==
- Abu Taher Misbah
- Mahmudul Hasan
- Fayez Ullah
