= Deen Muhammad Khan =

Bangladeshi Islamic scholar (1900–1974)

Shaykh-ut-Tafsir Deen Muhammad Khan

Personal details
- Born: 1900 Dhaka
- Died: 2 December 1974 (aged 73–74)
- Party: Jamiat Ulema-e-Islam Bangladesh
- Education: Darul Uloom Deoband
- Main interests: Hadith; Politics
- Notable works: Jamia Qurania Arabia Lalbagh; Siratunnabi Committee

Religious life
- Denomination: Sunni
- Jurisprudence: Hanafi
- Movement: Deobandi

Senior posting
- Teacher: Anwar Shah Kashmiri; Kifayatullah Dehlawi

Deen Muhammad Khan (1900–1974) was a Bangladeshi Deobandi Islamic scholar and mufassir. He was known for interpreting the Quran in Urdu. After completed his studies at Darul Uloom Deoband, he started teaching. He was one of the founders of Jamia Qurania Arabia Lalbagh. He taught for sometime in the Department of Islamic Studies at University of Dhaka and later at Government Madrasah-e-Alia. He was a politician of Jamiat Ulema-e-Islam Bangladesh.

== Early life and education ==
Khan was born in January 1900 to a Bengali Muslim family in Dhaka. His father, Nurullah Khan, was a captain in the British Indian Army. His education began at the Chawkbazar Shahi Mosque in Dhaka. At that time Ibrahim Peshawari was in charge of religious education in Chawkbazar Mosque. He studied the primary textbooks of the Qawmi Madrasah to the secondary under Ibrahim Peshawari. He then went to Darul Uloom Deoband to pursue a higher degree in Hadith, Tafsir and Fiqh. Among his teachers was Anwar Shah Kashmiri. He also received a certificate of hadith from Kifayatullah Dehlawi.

== Career ==
For ten years from 1920 to 1930, he taught in various madrasas including Hammadia Madrasa in Dhaka. At that time, when Abdul Karim Madani came to preach Islam in Bangladesh, he met Madani. He used to translate Arabic discourses of various religious gatherings of Madani. Madani is fascinated by his proper translation and narrative style. So he took him on his way to Burma in 1930. There he was appointed Imam and Mufti of the Bangalo Munni Jame Mosque. He started lecturing on Tafsirul Quran in the mosque. Gradually he completed the Tafsir of the Qur'an in its entirety. When World War II broke out in 1941, he taught in the Department of Islamic Studies at Dhaka University and later at Government Madrasah-e-Alia. He was one of the founders of Jamia Qurania Arabia Lalbagh. After its establishment, he became its nazem ala. He also contributed to Islamic politics. He was imprisoned in Assam for some time for his active participation in the Khilafat Movement. He also played a significant role in the Pakistan Movement. He was a politician of Jamiat Ulema-e-Islam Bangladesh. His name is mentioned as the forerunner of the formation of Siratunnabi Committee in Dhaka. He held a huge rally on the Racecourse Ground. He was a regular presenter on a radio program in East Pakistan entitled "The Qur'an and Our Lives". He has published two books. One is related to Tafseer of Surah Yusuf, the other is related to Dowa, Darood and Tasawwuf.

== Death ==
He died on 2 December 1974. The next day his janaza was held at Lalbagh Kella Maidan. There were millions of people at his funeral. He was buried at Lalbagh Shahi Mosque graveyard.

== See more ==
- List of Deobandis
