= Jamia Islamia Yunusia =

Islamic university in Bangladesh

Coordinates: 23.9722°N 91.1123°E

- Yunusia Madrasah
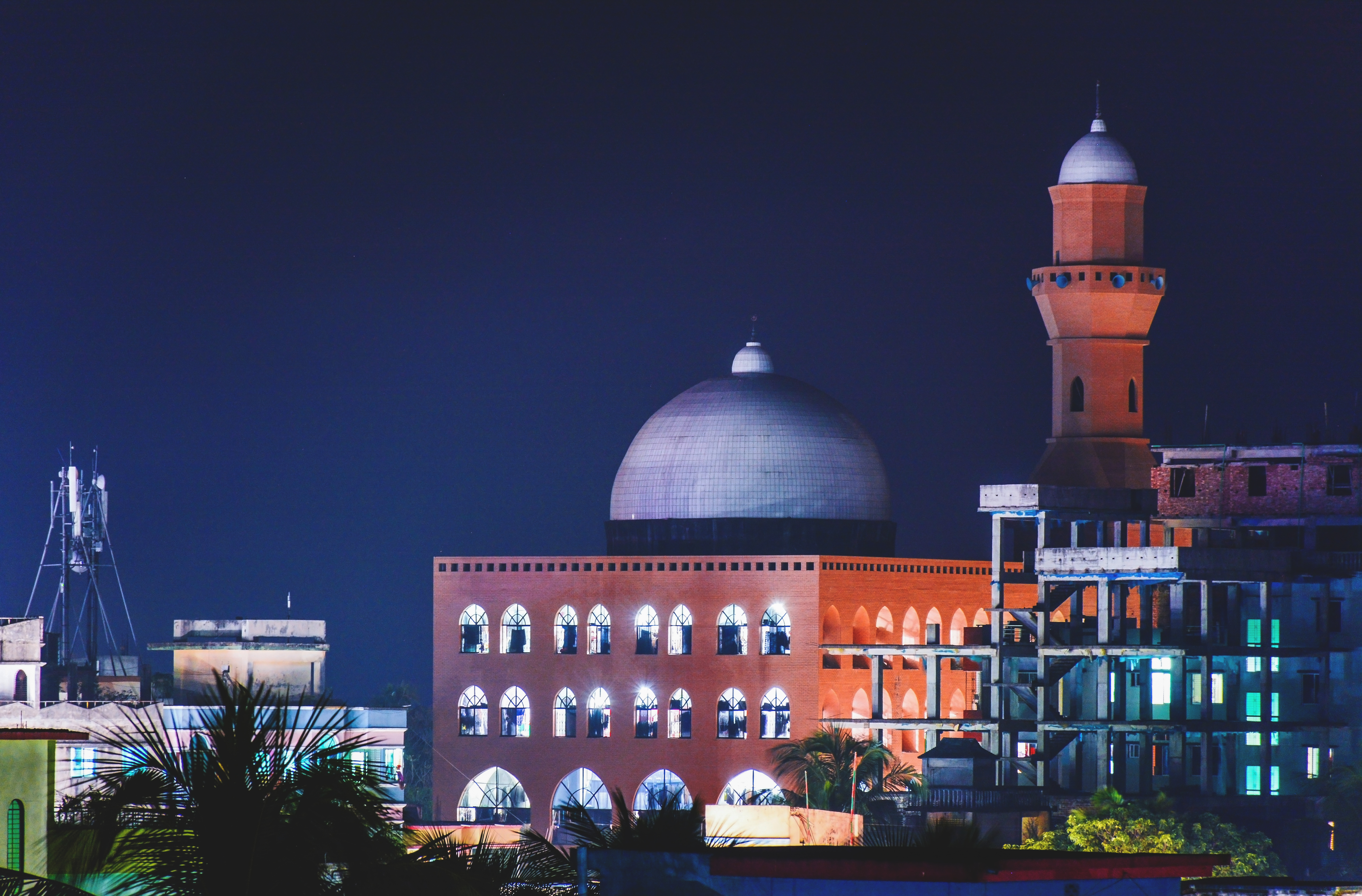
- Motto: Arabic: إِنَّمَا أَنَا قَاسِمٌ وَاللَّهُ يُعْطِي (I am just a distributor, but the grant is from Allah.)
- Type: Islamic university
- Established: 1914 (1328 Hijri)
- Chancellor: Majlis-e-Shura
- Academic staff: 56
- Students: 2500 (total)
- Undergraduates: 350
- Location: Paikpara, Brahmanbaria, Bangladesh
- Campus: Urban

Al-Jāmiʿah al-Islāmiyyah al-Yūnusiyyah (Arabic: الجامعة الإسلامية اليونسية), also known as Jamia Islamia Yunusia (Bengali: জামেয়া ইসলামিয়া ইউনুছিয়া), is a madrasa, located in the neighbourhood of Paikpara in Brahmanbaria, Bangladesh. It is one of the Qawmi Jamiahs of Bangladesh; and, as of 1998, it controlled most of the other madrasahs in Brahmanbaria.

== History ==
It was established by Abu Taher Muhammad Yunus, after whom the Madrasah is named, in 1914 and teacher was Motiur Rahman. Then it was headed by another Deobandi scholar Tajul Islam and later Shamsul Haque Faridpuri. Five students were killed during the 2001 Fatwa Movement. The current Muhtamim is Mufti Mubarakullah and teacher is Shamsul Haq Saraili.

== Notable alumni ==
- Azizul Haque, former teacher and student
- Fazlul Haque Amini, former student
- Shamsul Haque Faridpuri, former principal
- Sajidur Rahman, current Shaikul Hadith
