= 1981 Bangladeshi presidential election =

- 15 November 1981
- Turnout: 56.51%
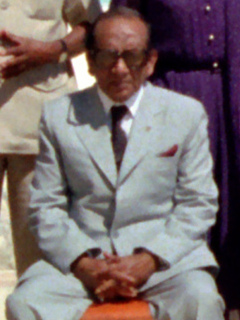

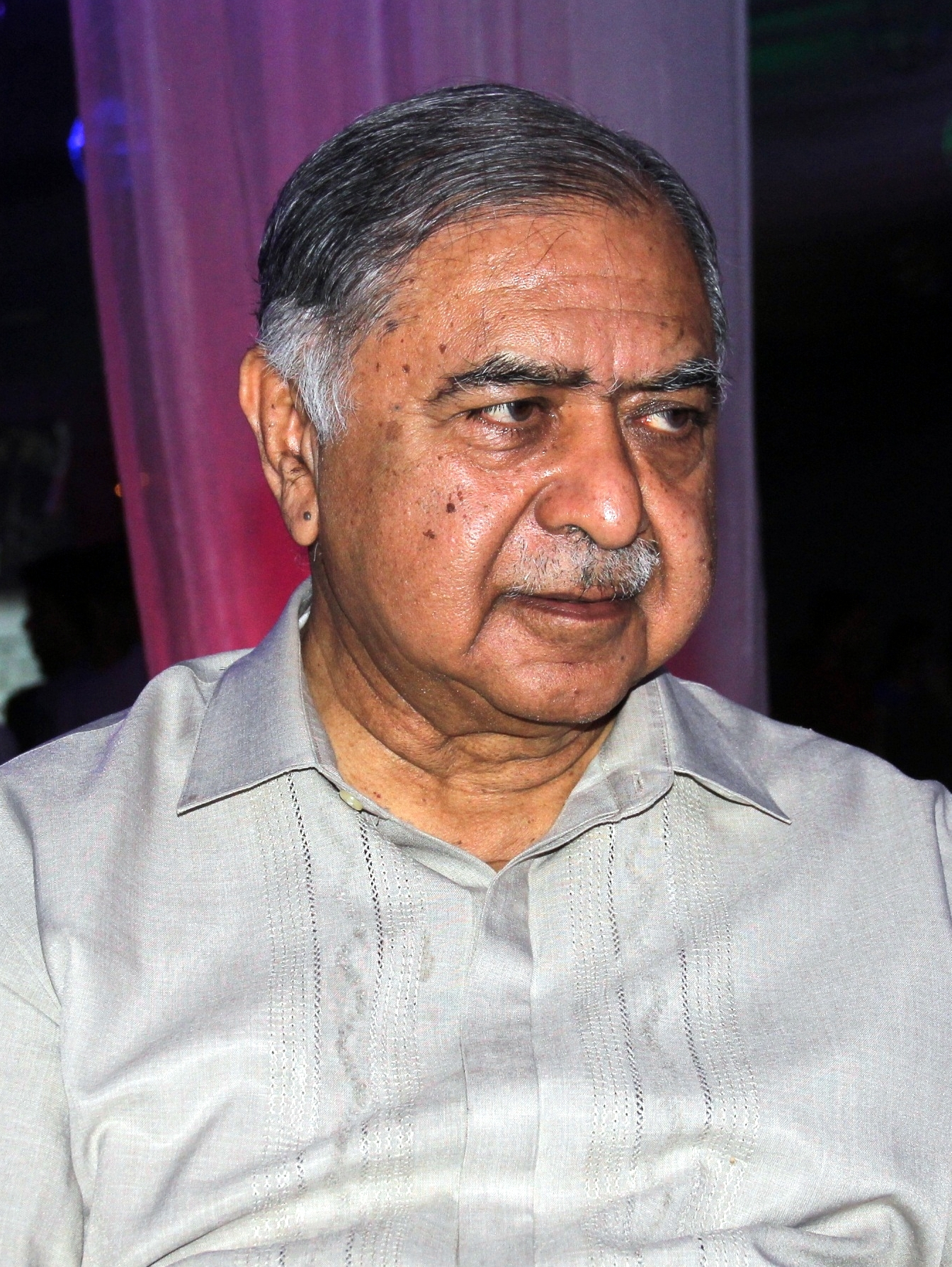
Candidate	Abdus Sattar	Kamal Hossain
Party	BNP	AL
Popular vote	14,203,958	5,636,113
Percentage	65.52%	26.00%
President before election
Abdus Sattar (acting)
BNP
Elected President
Abdus Sattar
BNP

Presidential elections were held in Bangladesh on 15 November 1981. The result was a victory for the incumbent acting President Abdus Sattar of the Bangladesh Nationalist Party (BNP), who received 66% of the vote, beating his principal challenger Kamal Hossain of the Awami League. Voter turnout was 57%.

== Background ==
On 30 May 1981 president Ziaur Rahman was assassinated by a faction of rebel officers of the Bangladesh Army. Following the assassination, Vice President Abdus Sattar automatically became the acting president, despite being in hospital at the time. Speaking to foreign reporters in Bangabhaban on 4 June, Sattar announced that in line with the constitution, elections would be held within 180 days of the death of the former president, to "foil any conspiracy to disturb the democratic process in the country."

== Campaign ==
According to the New York Times, much of the campaign revolved around the legacy of the two late leaders of the BNP and Awami League, Ziaur Rahman and Sheikh Mujibur Rahman. On the day before the elections, the newspaper reported "Despite the lively participation of 26 candidates, the Bangladesh presidential election campaign that ended here today has been dominated almost entirely by the auras of two dead adversaries. The two - Sheikh Mujibur Rahman, who led the country to independence and was killed in 1975, and Gen. Ziaur Rahman, who governed for five years until he was murdered by army officers last May 30 - were the centerpieces at huge rallies that the two major parties staged here in the capital."

Among the minor candidates was Saifur Rahman (popularly known as "Chhokka Chhoyfur"), a cook and pushcart driver from Sylhet who contested as an independent. Despite his humble background and grassroots campaign, he finished eighth; reflecting on the result in a later interview, he humorously remarked that he was the "eighth President" of the country and could have taken office had the seven candidates ahead of him passed away on election day. His campaign was noted for its grassroots nature, including his initial refusal of state security on the grounds that he could not afford to provide their meals.

== Results ==
Candidate	Party	Votes	%
Abdus Sattar	Bangladesh Nationalist Party	14,203,958	65.52
Kamal Hossain	Awami League	5,636,113	26.00
Hafezzi Huzur	Independent	388,741	1.79
M. A. G. Osmani	Independent	293,637	1.35
M. A. Jalil	Jatiya Samajtantrik Dal	248,769	1.15
Muzaffar Ahmed	NAP (M)–CPB	224,188	1.03
Alhaj Golam Morshed	Independent	75,759	0.35
Saifur Rahman	Independent	65,244	0.30
31 other candidates		541,151	2.50
Total		21,677,560	100.00
Valid votes		21,677,560	98.49
Invalid/blank votes		332,524	1.51
Total votes		22,010,084	100.00
Registered voters/turnout		38,951,014	56.51
Source: Nohlen et al.

== Aftermath ==
Sattar was overthrown in a bloodless coup d'état in March 1982 by the Army Chief of Staff, Hussain Muhammad Ershad, who assumed the Presidency in 1983, until being deposed himself in a popular mass uprising in 1990.
