= Bangladesh Khelafat Majlis =

Far-right political party in Bangladesh

Bangladesh Khelafat Majlis বাংলাদেশ খেলাফত মজলিস
- Abbreviation: BKM
- Leader: Mamunul Haque
- Secretary-General: Jalaluddin Ahmed
- Founder: Azizul Haque
- Founded: December 8, 1989; 36 years ago
- Registered: 2008
- Split from: Khelafat Majlis
- Preceded by: Bangladesh Khelafat Andolon (faction)
- Headquarters: 59/3/3 Purana Paltan, Dhaka
- Student wing: Bangladesh Khelafat Chhatra Majlis
- Youth wing: Bangladesh Khelafat Jubo Majlis
- Women's wing: Bangladesh Khelafat Mohila Majlis
- Labour wing: Bangladesh Khelafat Sramik Majlis
- Ideology: Islamism; Islamic fundamentalism; Pan-Islamism; Caliphatism; Social conservatism; Deobandism
- Political position: Far-right
- Religion: Islam
- National affiliation: 11 Party Alliance
- Slogan: Religion and opinion, Khilafah for all
- Seats in Parliament: 3 / 350

Election symbol
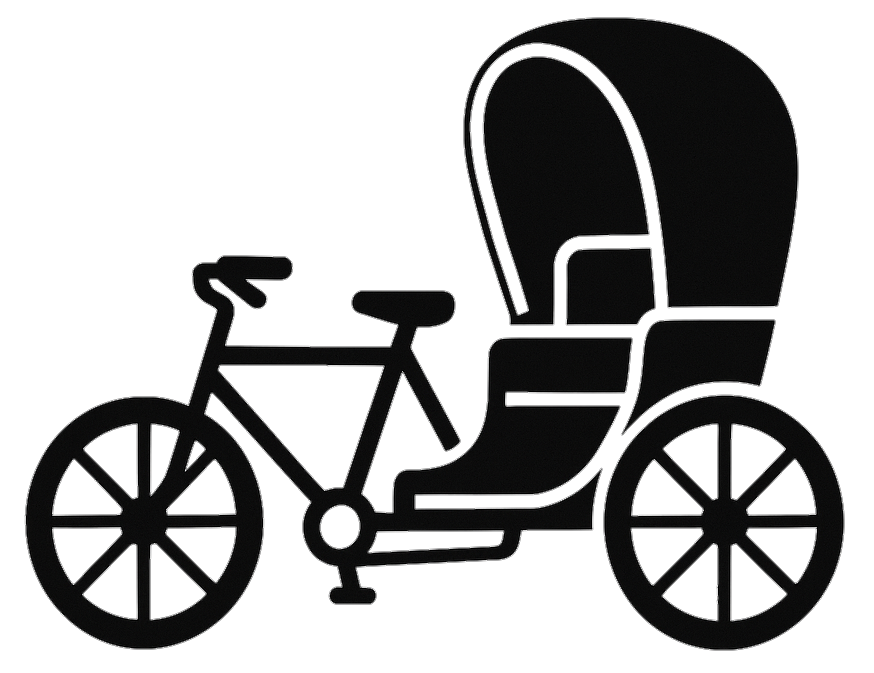
- Rickshaw

Party flag

Website
- bangladeshkhelafatmajlis.org

Bangladesh Khelafat Majlis (Bengali: বাংলাদেশ খেলাফত মজলিস) is a far-right Islamist political party in Bangladesh founded on 8 December 1989. The party is led by Mamunul Haque as its Ameer, with Yusuf Ashraf serving as the Senior Naib-e-Ameer and Jalaluddin Ahmed as the Secretary General. Its electoral symbol is a rickshaw. The party is a component of the 11-Party Alliance. In the 2026 Bangladeshi general election, the party secured its first-ever parliamentary seats in history.

== History ==
Bangladesh Khelafat Majlis was established on 8 December 1989 at the Engineers Institution auditorium under the initiative of a faction of the Bangladesh Khilafat Andolan led by Azizul Haque, the Islamic Jubo Shibir led by Ahmed Abdul Kader, a faction of Bhashani's NAP, and Tamaddun Majlish organizer and Language Movement veteran Masud Khan. Maulana Abdul Ghaffar served as its first Ameer. He was later succeeded by Azizul Haque, and subsequently by Maulana Habibur Rahman.

In 2005, Bangladesh Khelafat Majlis split into two factions. One faction retained the name Khelafat Majlis and remained within the BNP-led 20 Party Alliance, while the other faction broke away and continued operations under the name "Bangladesh Khelafat Majlis". Prior to the 2008 general election, a 5-point agreement was signed between Bangladesh Khelafat Majlis and the Awami League, wherein the Awami League pledged not to enact any laws contrary to the Quran and Sunnah if elected. However, the agreement could not be fully implemented due to pressure from secular and leftist factions.

Following the fall of Sheikh Hasina's government on 5 August 2024, the party gained prominence in national politics. In the 2026 general election, the party joined the 11-Party Electoral Alliance.

== Organizational structure ==
- Full Member (Sodoshy)
- Active Worker (Kormi)
- Associate (Nakib)

== List of Ameers ==
- Abdul Ghaffar (1989–1996)
- Azizul Haque (1996–2012)
- Habibur Rahman (2012–2018)
- Ismail Nurpuri (2018–2024)
- Mamunul Haque (2024–present)

== Electoral history ==
In the 13th parliamentary election, the party achieved its highest vote share of 2.09% and won two general seats in Parliament. Additionally, it secured one reserved seat for women. Nationally, the party finished 4th in terms of total parliamentary representation.

=== Jatiya Sangsad elections ===
Election	Party leader	Votes	%	Seats	+/–	Position	Outcome
2026	Mamunul Haque	1,564,187	2.09%	3 / 350	Boycotted	4th	Opposition

== Associated wings ==
- Bangladesh Khelafat Chhatra Majlis: Established on 5 January 1990, it functions as the student wing of the party.
- Bangladesh Khelafat Jubo Majlis: Launched on 29 May 2009 from the Baitul Mukarram National Mosque, its founding president was Muhammad Mamunul Haque.
- Bangladesh Khelafat Mohila Majlis: The women's wing of the party, which gained representation in Parliament via a reserved women's seat following the 2026 elections.
- Bangladesh Khelafat Sramik Majlis: Formed on 22 July 2023 to advance workers' rights and promote Islamic labour policies.
- Jatiyo Ulama Council Bangladesh: Launched on 20 November 2025 in Dhaka as a collective platform for Islamic scholars in the country.

== See also ==
- List of Deobandi organizations
- Politics of Bangladesh
