= Asian University of Bangladesh =

Private university in Bangladesh

Coordinates: 23.8692°N 90.3996°E

Asian University of Bangladesh (AUB)
- এশিয়ান ইউনিভার্সিটি অফ বাংলাদেশ
- Logo of Asian University of Bangladesh
- Other name: AUB
- Motto: A New Horizon in Education
- Type: Private
- Established: 1996; 30 years ago
- Affiliations: University Grants Commission, Bangladesh
- Chancellor: President Mohammed Shahabuddin
- Vice-Chancellor: Professor Dr. Md. Mosharraf Hossain Bhuiyan (Acting)
- Dean: Mohammad Nurul Islam, School of Business; Osman Ghani, School of Arts; Abul Hasan M. Sadeq, School of Social Sciences; Shireen Akhter, School of Education
- Faculty: 270
- Administrative staff: 200
- Students: More than 17000
- Location: Dhaka, Bangladesh
- Campus: Ashulia
- Website: www.aub.ac.bd

Asian University of Bangladesh (Bengali: এশিয়ান ইউনিভার্সিটি অব বাংলাদেশ) or AUB is a private university in Bangladesh. It was established on 4 January 1996 by the Private University Act 1992. The AUB permanent campus is at Ashulia. The university is affiliated by University Grants Commission (Bangladesh).

== History ==
Asian University of Bangladesh was established in 1996. AUB received formal approval of the government of Bangladesh on 4 January 1996 as a teaching and degree awarding university under the Private University Act, 1992. It was inaugurated by the then honorable minister for water resources of the government of Bangladesh, Abdur Razzak, MP, in a ceremony where the special guest was the then chairman of the University Grants Commission (UGC), Iajuddin Ahmed. The Founder of AUB, Abul Hasan M. Sadeq established this university .

== List of vice-chancellors ==
- Professor Dr. Md. Mosharraf Hossain Bhuiyan (Acting) ( 12/01/2026 to Present)
- Shahjahan Khan (12/01/2022-12/01/2026)

== Academics ==
=== Schools (Faculties) and departments ===
1. The School of Social Sciences.
  - Department of Sociology and Anthropology
  - Department of Social Work
  - Department of Economics
  - Department of Information Science and Library Management
  - Department of Government and Politics
2. The School of Sciences and Engineering.
  - Department of Computer Science and Engineering
  - Department of Computer Science
3. The School of Arts.
  - Department of English
  - Department of Bengali
  - Department of Islamic Studies
  - Department of Islamic History and Civilization
4. The School of Education and Training.
  - Department of Education and Training
5. The School of Business and Administration.
  - Department of Business Administration

== International advisors of AUB ==
An international council of advisors has been formed to advise AUB in its academic programs. The council consists of academicians from universities in Australia, Canada, Malaysia and the United States of America. The honourable advisors are:

- Ian Small, Head, Distance Education Center, University of New England, Australia
- Masud Chowdhury, University College of Cape Breton, Nova Scotia
- Kabir Hasan, University of New Orleans, University of New England
- Anis Chowdhury, University of Western Sydney, Australia
- Mohammad Ansari, Athabasca University, Athabasca. Alberta, Canada
- Mohammad Abdur Rashid, International Islamic University, Malaysia
