= Shamsul Haque Faridpuri =

Islamic scholar (1896–1969)

Mujahid-e-Azam Shamsul Haque Faridpuri
- Title: Sadr Saheb Huzur

Personal life
- Born: Shamsul Haque; 1896 Gawhardanga, Tungipara, Gopalganj, British India
- Died: 21 January 1969 (aged 72–73)
- Resting place: Jamia Islamia Darul Uloom Khademul Islam Gawhardanga
- Parents: Munshi Muhammad Abdullah (father); Aminah Khatun (mother)
- Era: 19th–20th century
- Main interest(s): Hadith, fiqh
- Education: Darul Uloom Deoband
- Occupation: Teacher, writer

Religious life
- Religion: Islam
- Denomination: Sunni
- Jurisprudence: Hanafi
- Tariqa: Chishti Order
- Movement: Deobandi

Muslim leader
- Teacher: Izaz Ali Amrohi; Anwar Shah Kashmiri; Hussain Ahmad Madani
- Disciple of: Zafar Ahmad Usmani
- Influenced by: Ashraf Ali Thanwi
- Influenced: Azizul Haque, Fazlul Haque Amini

President of Idarat al-Maʿarif
- Succeeded by: Muhammad Yunus

Personal details
- Children: Ruhul Amin

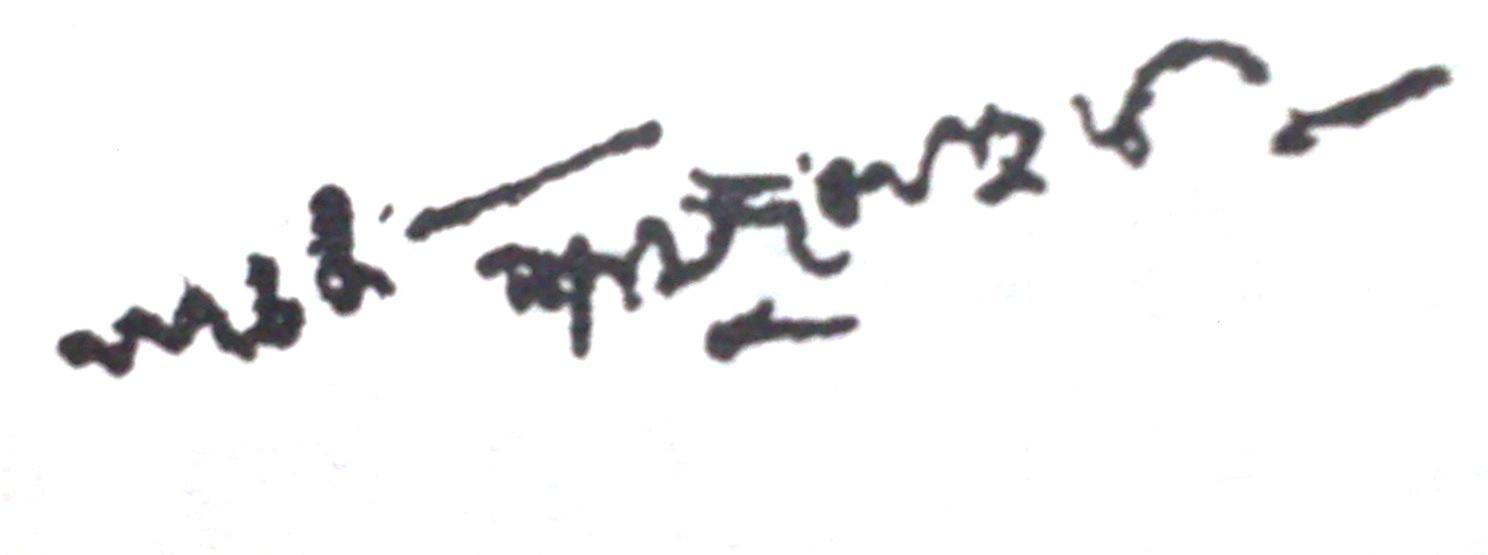
Signature

Shamsul Haque Faridpuri (Bengali: শামসুল হক ফরিদপুরী; 1896 – 21 January 1969) was an Islamic scholar, educationist, and social reformer. He was the founding principal of Jamia Qurania Arabia Lalbagh. He also founded many other madrasas. Organisations that he initiated include Khademul Islam Jamat and Anjuman-e-Tabligh-al-Quran.

== Early life and family ==
Ghazi Shamsul Haque was born on a Friday in 1896, to the Bengali Muslim Ghazi family in the village of Ghoperdanga (later Gawhardanga) in erstwhile Faridpur District, Bengal Presidency, British Raj (now Gopalganj District, Bangladesh). He traces his paternal ancestry to an Arab soldier who was one of the members of Bakhtiyar Khalji's army during his conquest of Bengal. His ancestors settled in Jessore where they propagated Islam to locals with his great-great-grandfather, Mawlana Abdul Awwal al-Ghazi, relocating the family to Faridpur. His father, Ghazi Muhammad Abdullah ibn Chiragh Ali, was a munshi and participant of the Indian Rebellion of 1857, and his mother, Amena Khatun, was a homemaker. Faridpuri's great-grandfather, Chand Ghazi, was a student of Syed Ahmad Shaheed and took part in the Battle of Balakot against the Sikhs.

== Education ==
Faridpuri first began his preschool education under the local Hindu pandit of Patgati. He then studied in Tungipara and Sutiakathi School, where he completed his primary education. In 1915, he was the best performer for class 6 in the annual exams at the Baghariya High School in Noapara. He then joined for class 7 at the Calcutta Alia Madrasa and in 1919 he passed the entrance exam for the Anglo-Persian department. With a scholarship, Faridpuri enrolled at the Presidency College Calcutta for a few days before being interrupted by Mahatma Gandhi's non-cooperation movement. As a result, Faridpuri left the college and set off for Thana Bhawan, where he met Ashraf Ali Thanwi. Under Thanwi's advice, Faridpuri enrolled at the Mazahir Uloom seminary in Saharanpur, where he completed Islamic studies up to a bachelor's level. He then moved on to study at Darul Uloom Deoband where he studied tasawwuf under Thanwi and hadith under Anwar Shah Kashmiri, Izaz Ali Amrohi and Hussain Ahmad Madani until 1927. Faridpuri also gained khilafat from Zafar Ahmad Usmani and Abdul Ghani.

== Career ==
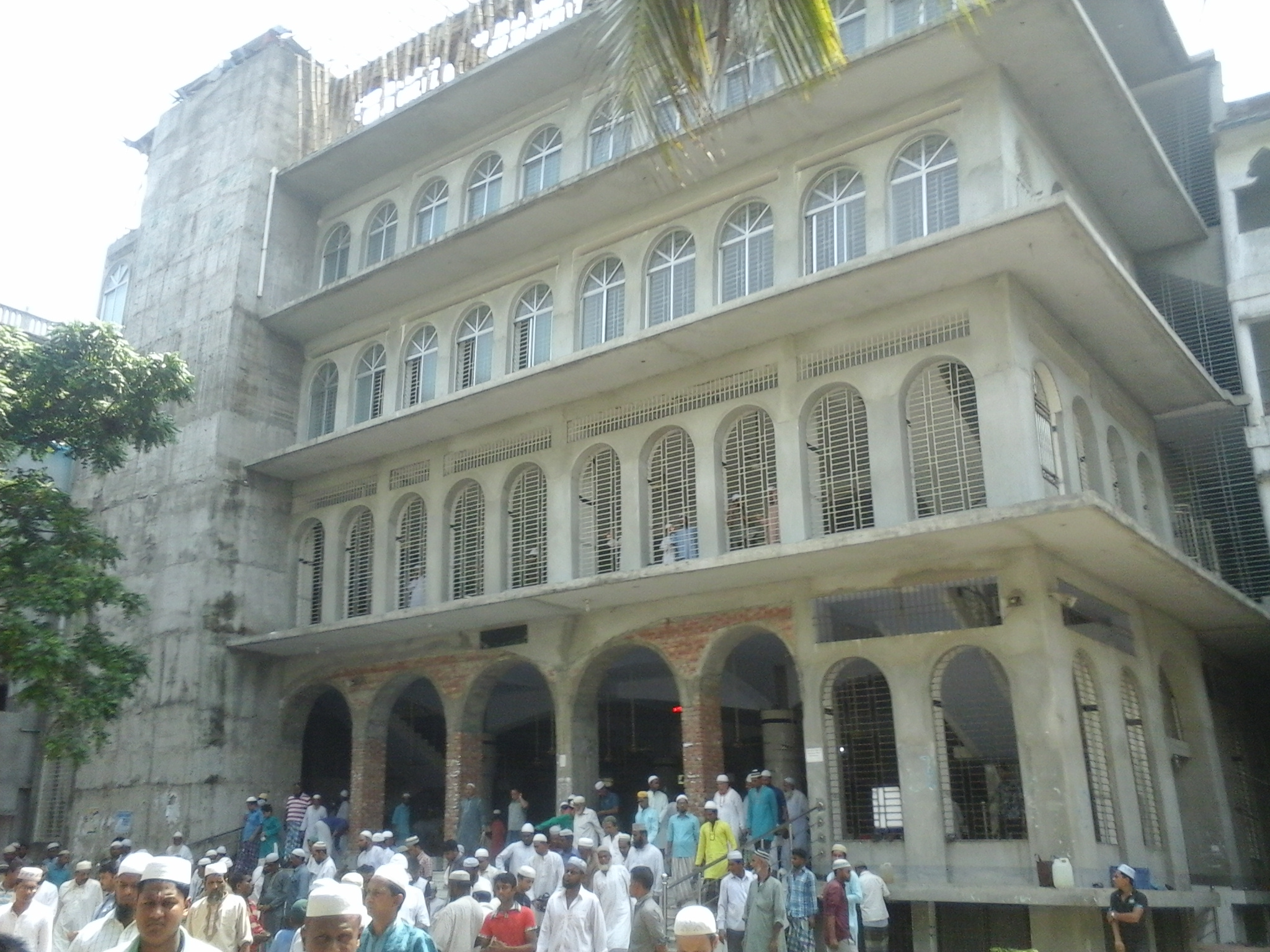
Jamia Arabia Imdadul Uloom in Faridabad, Dhaka

After completing his education, Faridpuri returned to his homeland in Bengal, where he became a prominent teacher of hadith. He became the principal of Jamia Islamia Yunusia in Brahmanbaria in 1928 until 1935, when he founded the Gazalia Madrasa in Bagerhat. He then moved on to Ashraful Uloom in Bara Katara, Dhaka, from 1936 until 1950. He founded the Jamia Islamia Darul Uloom Khademul Islam in his home village of Gawhardanga in 1937. In 1940, he founded Khademul Islam Jamat (Congregation of the Guardians of Islam), an organisation that promoted the implementation of Islamic ideals. He also founded the Anjuman-e-Tabligh-al-Quran (Association of Quranic Preaching) to challenge the activities of Christian Missionaries that were actively propagating to Muslims in the region. Faridpuri was an advocate of campaigns such as the Pakistan Movement and the Tablighi Jamaat. The Idaratul Ma`arif was a centre for Islamic research that was established by Faridpuri. From 1951 up until his death, he taught hadith classes in Jamia Qurania Arabia Lalbagh. He also founded the capital's Jamia Arabia Imdadul Uloom in Faridabad in 1956.

== Bibliography ==
Title (romanised)	Bengali	English translation	Refs
Adorsho Muslim Poribar O Shushthu Porikolpona	আদর্শ মুসলিম পরিবার ও সুষ্ঠু পরিকল্পনা	Ideal Muslim family and elegant plans	
Allahr Porichoy O Manusher Porichoy	আল্লাহর পরিচয় ও মানুষের পরিচয়	God's background and mankind's background	
Bhul Shongshodhon	ভুল সংশোধন	Emendation of Mistakes	
Choritro Gothon	চরিত্র গঠন	Character Development	
Dhormer Ashol Uddeshyo Ki?	ধর্মের আসল উদ্দেশ্য কী?	What is the main goal of religion?	
Dhormo O Rajneeti	ধর্ম ও রাজনীতি	Religion and politics	
Hadiser Rotno-Bhandar Ba Shashon Poddhoti	হাদীসের রত্নভাণ্ডার বা শাসন পদ্ধতি	The gem-stores of Hadith or ruling method	
Hajjer Masail	হজ্জের মাসায়েল	The topic of Hajj	
Halal-Haram O Bidat-Ijtihad	হালাল-হারাম ও বিদয়াত-ইজতেহাদ	Halal–haram and bid'ah–ijtihad	
Hoqqani Tafsir	হক্কানী তাফসীর	—	
Islahe Nafs	ইসলাহে নফস	Soul reformation	
Jibon Patheyo	জীবন পাথেয়	Viaticum of life	
Jihader Gurutto O Fazilat	জিহাদের গুরুত্ব ও ফজিলত	Importance and virtue of Jihad	
Ma-Bap O Shontaner Hoq	মা-বাপ ও সন্তানের হক	Rights of the parents and children	
Matri Jatir Morjada	মাতৃজাতির মর্যাদা	The dignity of matriarchs	
Mosjid O Jibonto Mosjid	মসজিদ ও জীবন্ত মসজিদ	Mosque and living mosques	
Namazer Ortho	নামাজের অর্থ	The meaning of prayer	
Oshot Alem O Peer Ebong Shotorko Bani	অসৎ আলেম ও পীর : সতর্কবাণী	The dishonest alim and pir and words of warning	
Potito Pabon	পতিত পবন	Fallen wind	
Proloyongkari Ghurnijhorer Karon Ki?	প্রলয়ংকারী ঘূর্ণিঝড়ের কারণ কী?	What is the reason behind catastrophic cyclones?	
Quraner Upor Hostokhep Bordasht Kora Jabe Na	কুরআনের উপর হস্তক্ষেপ বরদাশত করা যাবে না	Interference against the Quran will not be tolerated	
Rozar Fazilat	রোজার ফজিলত	Virtue of Fasting	
Shongkkhepe Islam	সংক্ষেপে ইসলাম	Islam in short	
Shotru Theke Hushiar Thako	শত্রু থেকে হুঁশিয়ার থাকো	Beware of the enemy	
Tabligh O Islami Zindegi	তাবলীগ ও ইসলামী জিন্দেগি	Tabligh and Islamic life	
Tafsire Sura Fateha	তাফসীরে সূরা ফাতেহা	Exegesis of Surah al-Fatiha	
Tasauof Totto	তাসাওউফ তত্ত্ব	Inquiry of Mysticism	
Taubanama O Jiboner Pon	তওবানামা ও জীবনের পণ	The story of repentance and the stake of life	
Votarer Dayitto O Vote Shomporke Shorioter Nirdesh	ভোটারের দায়িত্ব ও ভোট সম্পর্কে শরীয়তের নির্দেশ	Responsibilities of the voter and instructions for voting from the Sharia	

=== Translations ===
- Sahih Al Bukhari
- Bahishti Zewar

== See also ==
- List of Deobandis
