= Louhajang Upazila =

Louhojong লৌহজং
- Upazila
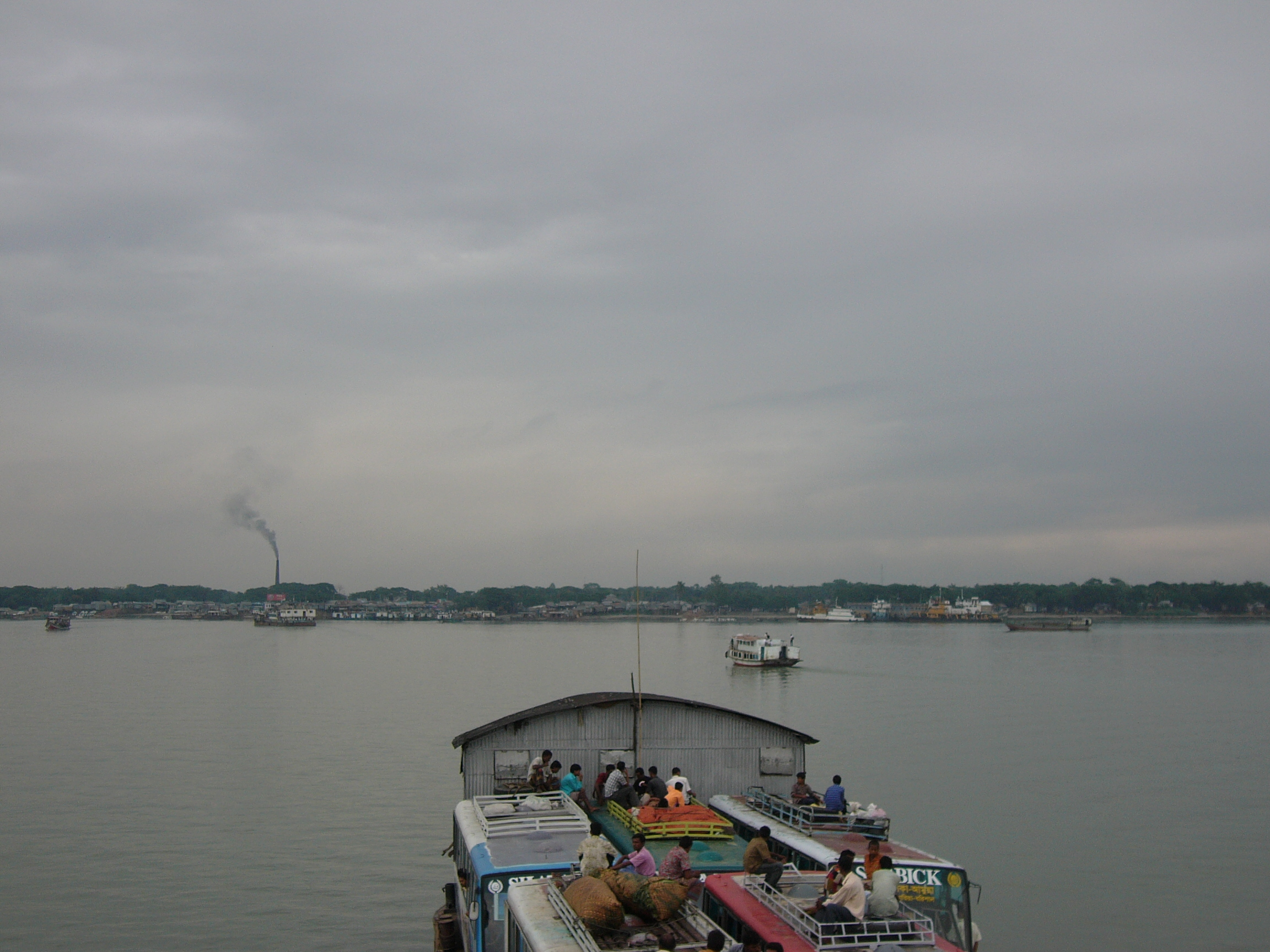
- Padma River at Lohajang Upazila

- Coordinates: 23.4667°N 90.3417°E
- Country: Bangladesh
- Division: Dhaka
- District: Munshiganj

Area
  - Total: 131.10 km^{2} (50.62 sq mi)

Population (2022)
  - Total: 177,802
  - Density: 1,356.2/km^{2} (3,512.6/sq mi)
- Time zone: UTC+6 (BST)
- Postal code: 1530
- Area code: 06923
- Website: louhajanj.munshiganj.gov.bd

Lohajang Upazila mauza geocode map

Lohajang (লৌহজং; lit. rusting of iron) is an upazila of Munshiganj District in Dhaka Division, Bangladesh.

== Geography ==
Lohajang is located at 23.4667°N 90.3417°E on the south bank of Padma River. It has a total area of 131.10 km^{2}.

== Demographics ==
Historical population
Year	Pop. (000)	±%
1981	154	—
1991	153	−0.6%
2001	168	+9.8%
2011	159	−5.4%
2022	178	+11.9%
Source: Bangladesh Bureau of Statistics

Religions in Louhajang Upazila (2022)
Religion	Percent
Islam	92.15%
Hinduism	7.76%
Other or not stated	0.09%

According to the 2022 Bangladeshi census, Louhajang Upazila had 43,497 households and a population of 177,802. 9.33% of the population were under 5 years of age. Louhajang had a literacy rate (age 7 and over) of 77.98%: 79.68% for males and 76.41% for females, and a sex ratio of 93.55 males for every 100 females. 21,422 (12.05%) lived in urban areas.

According to the 2011 Census of Bangladesh, Louhajang Upazila had 35,978 households and a population of 159,242. 33,395 (20.97%) inhabitants were under 10 years of age. Louhajang had a literacy rate (age 7 and over) of 56.22%, compared to the national average of 51.8%, and a sex ratio of 1009 females per 1000 males. 4,945 (3.11%) lived in urban areas.

== Administration ==
Louhajang Upazila is divided into ten union parishads:

- Baultoli Union
- Bejgaon Union
- Gaodia Union
- Haldia Union
- Kalma Union
- Kanaksar Union
- Khidirpara Union
- Kumarbhog Union
- Lohajang-Teotia Union
- Medinimandal Union

The union parishads are subdivided into 115 mauzas and 114 villages.

== See also ==
- Upazilas of Bangladesh
- Districts of Bangladesh
- Divisions of Bangladesh
- Thanas of Bangladesh
- Union Councils of Bangladesh
