= Zafar Ahmad Usmani =

Pakistani Islamic scholar

- ظفر احمد عثمانی

Ameer of Jamiat Ulema-e-Islam
- In office 1949–1956
- Preceded by: Shabbir Ahmad Usmani
- Succeeded by: Ahmed Ali Lahori

Personal life
- Born: 4 October 1892 [13th of Rabi’ al-Awwal, 1310 AH] Deoband, India
- Died: 1974; Pakistan
- Era: Modern
- Region: Indian subcontinent
- Political party: Jamiat Ulema-e-Islam
- Main interest(s): Jurisprudence; Pakistan Movement activist
- Notable work: I'la al-Sunan

Religious life
- Religion: Islam

Muslim leader
- Teacher: Ashraf Ali Thanwi
- Students: Azizul Haque, Badre Alam Merathi, Muhiuddin Khan,Mahmudul Hasan
- Influenced by: Abu Hanifa
- Influenced: Deobandi movement

Zafar Ahmad Usmani (Urdu: ظفر احمد عثمانی; 4 October 1892 – 1974), also known as Zafar Ahmad Thanwi, was a Pakistani independence activist and Islamic jurist who became an influential figure of the Deobandi movement.

He is most famous for having written I'la Al-Sunan, a 20-volume Hadith encyclopedia of Hanafi proofs, written as a refutation by the Hanafi school against the objections raised by the growing Ahl-i Hadith movement, as per the request of his uncle Ashraf Ali Thanwi.

== Birth ==
Zafar Ahmad Usmani was born on 4 October 1892 in Deoband. His ism (given name) was Zafar Ahmad. His nasab (patronymic) is: Zafar Ahmad ibn Lateef Ahmad ibn Nehal Ahmad ibn Karamat Hussain ibn Nabi Bakhsh ibn Hayātullah ibn Ināyatullah ibn Laqā'ullāh ibn Ihsānullāh ibn Nasīrullah ibn Dīwān Lutfullah ibn Owais ibn Ahmad ibn Abd al-Razzāq ibn Muḥammad Hasan ibn Habībullah ibn Usmān ibn Ali ibn Shaykh Muḥammad ibn Fazlullāh ibn Abu al-Wafā Usmāni.

== Education and career ==
After the death of his mother when he was 3, he was raised by his grandmother, considered to be a religious woman. He started studying and memorizing the Quran at the age of 5. At age 7, he studied Mathematics, Urdu, and Persian under Mawlana Muhammad Yasin. His uncle, Ashraf Ali Thanwi guided him as he studied with more religious scholars.

In Pakistan, he became a close associate of Maulana Shabbir Ahmad Usmani and an active member of Jamiat Ulema-e-Islam founded by him. After the death of Shabbir Ahmad Usmani in 1949, he and Maulana Ehteshamul Haq Thanvi became key leaders of this party.

== Works ==
Usmani's most famous work is I’la’ al-Sunan, which is a hadith commentary that connects the opinions of this Hanafi's book with direct evidence from the Hadiths. The reason for this was that the Ahl-i Hadith movement was growing and bringing their objections, and Maulana Ashraf Ali Thanwi asked his nephew to respond. The book was first printed in 1923. It consists of 21 volumes.

- Qawaid fi Ulum al-Hadith

== Honored by Jinnah ==
At the independence of Pakistan ceremony in 1947, Quaid-e-Azam Muhammad Ali Jinnah asked the renowned religious scholar Maulana Shabbir Ahmad Usmani to hoist the Pakistani flag in Karachi and he asked Zafar Ahmad Usmani to hoist it in Dhaka. Also, since Zafar Ahmad Usmani was a jurist, he was selected to take oath from the first Chief Justice of Pakistan, Abdul Rashid.
