= Muhammadullah Hafezzi =

Bangladeshi politician

Mawlana Muhammadullah Hafezzi
- Photograph taken by Anwar Hossain in 1981

Personal life
- Born: Muhammadullah; 1895 Ludhua, Raipur, Lakshmipur, Bengal, British India
- Died: 6 May 1987 (aged 91–92) Bangladesh
- Resting place: Kamrangirchar, Dhaka, Bangladesh
- Citizenship: British Indian (1895-1947); Pakistani (1947-1971); Bangladeshi (1971-1987)
- Main interest(s): Islamic Politics, Sufism
- Occupation: Politician

Religious life
- Religion: Sunni Islam
- Jurisprudence: Hanafi
- Tariqa: Chishti (Sabiri)
- Movement: Deobandi

Senior posting
- Disciples: Hafez Ahmadullah Mohammad Abdul Jalil
- Students: Abdul Jabbar Jahanabadi, Azizul Haque
- Influenced by: Ashraf Ali Thanwi
- Influenced: Abu Taher Misbah

Muhammadullah Hafezzi (1895 – 6 May 1987), commonly known as Hafezzī Huzūr, was a Bangladeshi politician, Islamic leader and founder of the Bangladesh Khilafat Andolan. He was the first religious figure to stand for the highest state office in Bangladesh.

== Early life and education ==
Muhammadullah was born in the year 1895, in the village of Ludhua in the Raipur Thana of Lakshmipur, then under the Noakhali district of the Bengal Presidency. His father, Idris Mianji, was a munshi. Muhammadullah's grandfather, Akramuddin Mianji, was a disciple of Ghazi Imamuddin Bengali, a khalifa (spiritual successor) of Syed Ahmad Shaheed in Bengal.

Muhammadullah studied at Fatehpur Primary School before proceeding to Chandraganj Madrasa where he studied for a year. He then studied for a year at Nawab Faizunnesa's madrasa in Laksam, and then enrolling at the Khilbais Madrasa in Lakshmipur. In Panipat, first under Qari Abdus Salam in 1913 and then under Qari Akhlaq Husayn in 1915, he completed his hifz. Muhammadullah completed the seven qira'at under Qari Abdul Alim ibn Qari Abdur Rahman Panipati. He then moved on to study at Mazahir Uloom in Saharanpur from 1915 to 1922, where he completed Kutub al-Sittah. He gained a high-class certificate from Darul Uloom Deoband in 1923.

== Career ==
His entrance to politics started with the founding of the Nizam-e-Islam Party in 1952. In 1978, the President of Bangladesh Ziaur Rahman removed the ban on religion-based political parties in the country. In response, Hafezzi Huzur sent the President an open letter, requesting him to base the country's administration upon Islamic ideals. Following the assassination of Ziaur Rahman, Hafezzi Huzur stood up as an independent presidential candidate in the 1981 elections. He finished third, gaining 1.79% of the total votes.

Hafezzi Huzur founded his own political party known as Bangladesh Khilafat Andolan in November 1981. His political career included travelling and meeting dignitaries in Saudi Arabia, Iran and Iraq.

In response to military rule, Hafezzi Huzur formed a committee, the Sammilita Sangram Parishad (Combined Action Committee), consisting of 11 Islamic parties. He stood for the 1986 elections, in which he finished second with 5.69% of total votes.

== Views ==
Hafezzi Huzur expressed opposition to the 1982 coup d'état, labelling Hussain Muhammad Ershad's military rule as un-Islamic. In his Shotorkobaṇī (words of warning) booklet, he referred to the Bangladesh Jamaat-e-Islami as a Mawdudi fitnah that spreads misguidance.

== Death and legacy ==
Muhammadullah died on 7 May 1987. His janazah was performed at the National Eidgah in Dhaka.

In his honour, the erstwhile Mayor of Dhaka Mohammad Hanif renamed Phoenix Road (near Gulistan) to Mawlana Muhammadullah Hafezzi Huzur Road. This change was undone on 21 February 2017 by the Dhaka South City Corporation. This action was a part of a campaign to rename places named after anti-independence individuals, suggested by the Bangladesh High Court. Eyewitness accounts on the other hand, suggest that Hafezzi Huzur expressed support for the Bangladesh Liberation War referring to the Pakistan Army as oppressors. Mawlana Imdadul Haq Araihazari also states that his involvement as a Bengali freedom fighter is due to Hafezzi Huzur's expression of support.

== See also ==
- List of Deobandis
