= Azimpur, Dhaka =

Azimpur আজিমপুর
- Town
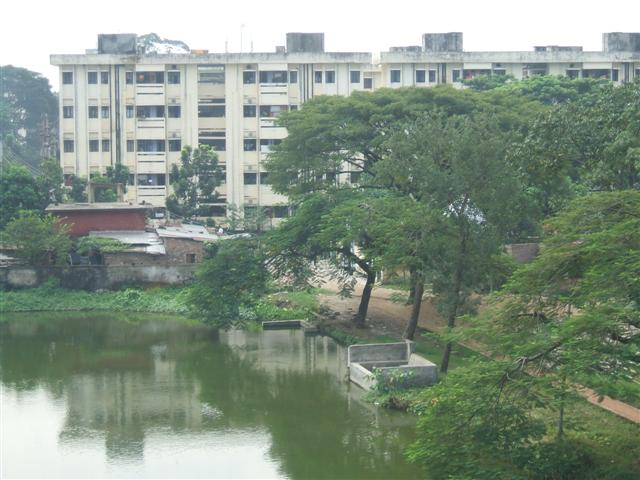
- Skyline of Azimpur, Dhaka, Bangladesh

- Location in Azimpur, Dhaka, Bangladesh
- Coordinates: 23°43.8′N 90°23.1′E
- Country: Bangladesh
- Division: Dhaka Division
- District: Dhaka District

Area
  - Total: 1.17 km^{2} (0.45 sq mi)

Population (2011)
  - Total: 96,641
  - Density: 82,600/km^{2} (214,000/sq mi)
- Time zone: UTC+6 (BST)

Azimpur (Bengali: আজিমপুর) is an old region in the old part of Dhaka, capital of Bangladesh. The region is named after 7th Mughal Emperor Azam Shah who was the youngest son and successor of Mughal Emperor Aurangzeb. Other accounts attribute the name to Azim-us-Shaan, the Nayeb-e-Nazim of Dhaka during the early 18th century, who was a grandson of Mughal emperor Aurangzeb. This area started to decay in the colonial era. In 1850, Azimpur shown as a no man's land in the map of surveyor general. In 1950, this area was redesigned as the government employee's residence.

== Geography ==
Azimpur is located at 23.7298°N 90.3854°E. Its total area is 1.17 km^{2}.

== Demographics ==
As of the 1991 Bangladesh census, Azimpur has a population of 96,641; male 51,598, female 45.043.

After the 1947 partition, many apartment buildings were built in Azimpur for government officers. The region has one of the largest cemeteries of Dhaka. The graveyard was established in 1850 on 32 acres (130,000 m^{2}) of land. It has more than 3900 permanent graves, and many temporary graves (which are reused after several years).

== Administration ==
Azimpur has 01 Ward (Ward 26), 20 Mahallas and 01 Police Outpost Station.

== Education ==
Eden College, was one of the oldest educational institutions for girls in erstwhile British India, is located in Azimpur. Renowned girls' schools such as Agrani School and College and a branch of Viqarunnisa Noon School and College are also located there. College of Home economics is another well being institute.

== See also ==
- Upazilas of Bangladesh
- Districts of Bangladesh
- Divisions of Bangladesh
- Administrative geography of Bangladesh
