= List of Darul Uloom Hathazari alumni =

Al-Jamiatul Ahlia Darul Ulum Moinul Islam popularly known as Hathazari Madrasa is the oldest and largest madrasa in Bangladesh. The following is a list of notable alumni.

Name	Introduction	Ref
Shah Abdul Wahhab	He was the chief disciple of Ashraf Ali Thanwi in Bengal and the 2nd Rector of Darul Uloom Hathazari.	
Muhammad Faizullah	He was the Mufti-e Azam or Grand Mufti of Bangladesh and was the Chief Mufti of Darul Uloom Hathazari for a long time. He established Jamia Islamia Hamius-Sunnah, an exceptional Islamic seminary.	
Mohammed Younus	Known as Shaykhul Arab wal Azam was a well-known international Islamic figure. He was the 2nd Rector of Al Jamia Al Islamia Patiya and the founding President of Befaqul Madarisil Arabia Bangladesh.	
Harun Babunagari	He was the founder and Rector of Al-Jamiatul Islamiah Azizul Uloom Babunagar.	
Abdur Rahman (scholar)	Popularly known as Faqihul Millat, the father of Islamic banking system in Bangladesh. He was the first student of the Fatwa Department of Darul Uloom Deoband. He was widely known as the Mufti. His fatwas have been published in 12 volumes under the name of Fatwa-e Faqihul Millat. He established numerous mosques, madrasas and charities including Islamic Research Center Bangladesh.	
Shah Ahmad Shafi	Known as Shaykhul Islam, he was a revolutionary Islamic spiritual figure. He established Hefazat-e-Islam Bangladesh and carried out major reforms at the national level. The historic Shapla Chattar Movement was held under his leadership. He was also the President of Befaqul Madarisil Arabia Bangladesh and Rector of Darul Uloom Hathazari.	
Muhibbullah Babunagari	He is the Chief Advisor of Hefazat-e-Islam Bangladesh and Rector of Al-Jamiatul Islamiah Azizul Uloom Babunagar.	
Junaid Babunagari	Known as Qaed-e Millat, Amir of Hefajat-e-Islam Bangladesh and Shaikhul Hadith of Darul Uloom Hathazari.	
Mizanur Rahman Sayed	Bangladeshi Mufti, founder of Sheikh Zakariyyah Islamic Research Center.	
Zia Uddin	He is the President of Jamiat Ulema-e-Islam Bangladesh and Azad Deeni Edara-e Talim Bangladesh, Rector of Jamia Madania Angura Mohammadpur.	
Tafazzul Haque Habiganji	He was the Vice-President of Hefazat-e-Islam Bangladesh and Jamiat Ulema-e-Islam Bangladesh, Rector of Jamia Islamia Arabia Umednagar.	
Nurul Islam Jihadi	He is the Secretary General of Hefazat-e-Islam Bangladesh and International Majlis-e Tahaffuj-e Khatme Nabuwat Bangladesh, Chancellor and Shaykh al-Hadith of Al Jamiatul Islamia Makhjanul Uloom.	
Izharul Islam	He is the founder of Jamiatul Uloom Al-Islamia Lalkhan Bazar.	

== See more ==
- List of Darul Uloom Deoband alumni
- List of Mazahir Uloom alumni

== Bibliography ==
- Babunagari, Junaid (2003). Some bright stars from Darul Uloom Hathazari (1st ed.). Hathazari, Chittagong: Bukhari Academy.
