= Shah Abdul Wahhab (born 1894) =

Bangladeshi Islamic scholar (1894–1982)

Hakim an-Nafs Shah Abd al-Wahhab
- শাহ আবদুল ওয়াহহাব

Rector of Darul Uloom Hathazari
- In office 1941–1982
- Preceded by: Habibullah Qurayshi
- Succeeded by: Muhammad Hamid

Personal details
- Born: 1894 Hathazari, Chittagong District, then part of the Bengal Presidency
- Died: 2 June 1982 (aged 87–88)
- Resting place: Maqbara-e-Habibi, Hathazari
- Education: Darul Uloom Hathazari; Mazahir Uloom; Darul Uloom Deoband

Personal life
- Children: 5
- Notable works: Monthly Muinul Islam; Daily Pasban; An-Nadi ath-Thaqafi; Ashrafia Library

Religious life
- Religion: Islam
- Denomination: Sunni
- Jurisprudence: Hanafi
- Movement: Deobandi

Muslim leader
- Teacher: Habibullah Qurayshi; Ibrahim Balyawi; Izaz Ali Amrohi; Aziz-ul-Rahman Usmani; Shabbir Ahmad Usmani; Anwar Shah Kashmiri
- Disciple of: Ashraf Ali Thanwi
- Disciples: Ishaq al-Ghazi
- Students: Jamir Uddin Nanupuri
- Influenced: Shamsul Haque Faridpuri Muhammadullah Hafezzi

Shah Abdul Wahhab (Bengali: শাহ আব্দুল ওয়াহহাব, romanized: śāh ābdul ōẏāhahāb; 1894 – 2 June 1982) was a Bangladeshi Deobandi Islamic scholar, educator, jurist, and spiritual leader. He served as the second rector of Darul Uloom Hathazari, primarily participating in administrative and educational activities. He was a vice president of the Jamiat Ulema-e-Islam, and sat on the Chittagong Court jury for 23 years. He graduated from Darul Uloom Deoband and Mazahir Uloom, and was one of the disciples of Ashraf Ali Thanwi.

Wahhab established several madrasas and mosques in Bangladesh. He participated in the Bishwa Ijtema and was associated with the Tablighi Jamaat movement in Bangladesh and Myanmar. He was also involved with the educational board Befaqul Madarisil Arabia Bangladesh, the Baitul Mukarram National Mosque, and the Islamic University, Bangladesh.

== Early life ==
Shah Abdul Wahhab was born in 1894 into a Bengali Muslim zamindar family in the village of Ruhullahpur, in the Hathazari Upazila of the Chittagong District within the Bengal Presidency. He was the only son of Qazi Abd al-Hakim and Begum Fazilatunnesa. His father, a sailor, was a follower of Abdul Wahid Bengali.

The family claims descent from Umar, the second Caliph of Islam. Shah Abdul Wahhab's ancestor, Shaykh Nasir ad-Din, is said to have migrated from Persia to the island of Sandwip in the Bay of Bengal. His great-grandfather, Shaykh Asʿad Ali, then moved from Sandwip to the village of Ruhullah Pur in Hathazari, Chittagong District, where the family settled.

== Education ==
Shah Abdul Wahhab began his education around the age of four under the guidance of his paternal uncle, Qazi Abdul-Bari, who was a graduate of the first batch of students at Darul Uloom Hathazari. He also studied under his father. After completing his primary education in the Qur'an and Persian language, his parents enrolled him at Darul Uloom Hathazari in 1904, under the supervision of Habibullah Qurayshi. He graduated from the Dawra-e-Hadith (Master's) program in 1914.

Following this, Shah Abdul Wahhab attended the Mazahir Uloom and Darul Uloom Deoband seminaries in Saharanpur, India. His classmates included Muhammad Tayyib Qasmi and Shafi Usmani. He studied Sahih al-Bukhari under Anwar Shah Kashmiri, Sahih Muslim under Shabbir Ahmad Usmani, and Muwatta Imam Malik under Aziz-ur-Rehman Usmani. His other teachers included Izaz Ali Amrohi and Ibrahim Balyavi. After completing his second Dawra-e-Hadith from Deoband, Abdul Wahhab studied higher Hadith studies under Kashmiri and became the seminary's first Bangladeshi student to graduate from that course.

== Sufism ==
After completing his education at Deoband, Shah Abdul Wahhab joined the Khanqah-i-Imdadia in Thana Bhawan to become a disciple of Ashraf Ali Thanvi. Habibullah Qurayshi wrote a letter to Thanvi in support of this. Within 18 days of his arrival in Thana Bhawan, Thanvi granted khilafat (spiritual succession) to Shah Abdul Wahhab. Thanvi conferred upon Abdul Wahhab the title of Junayd-e-Waqt. Abd al-Wahhab's name is sixteenth on the list at Khanqah-i-Imdadia. Shah Abdul Wahhab had 22 disciples, including Ishaq al-Ghazi.

== Career ==
Abdul Wahhab returned to Bengal in 1920. News of his swift appointment as Thanvi's successor reached Bengal, and locals organized a large public reception upon his arrival at the Port of Chittagong. He began his career as a teacher of Sahih Muslim at his former institution, Darul Uloom Hathazari. Later, as the institution's activities expanded, a vice-principal position was created, and Abdul Wahhab was appointed in 1930 upon the advice of Zamiruddin Ahmad. In 1939, he was appointed as the rector of Darul Uloom Hathazari by the 39-member Shura, and he began his duties in 1941. His time as rector has been described by some as the "era of the Shah" or "Hathazari golden era". Abdul Wahhab renamed the institution from "Madrasa Muinul Islam" (Spring of Islam madrasa) to the "Jamia Ahlia Darul Uloom Muinul Islam". This naming style influenced subsequent madrasas in Bangladesh, offering Dawra-e-Hadith.

== Hathazari madrasa ==
Abdul Wahhab was credited with initiating specialized studies and research beyond the Dawra-e-Hadith level in Bangladesh. He was also credited with establishing several departments at Darul Uloom Hathazari: a Department of Fatwa in 1945, a Department of Arabic in 1948, a Department of Writing in 1955, and a Department of Technical Training in 1966. His methodology is cited as influencing the Al Jamia Al Islamia Patiya, which established its Department of Bengali Language and Literature in 1952 and its Department of Qira'ah in 1975.

In 1934, Abdul Wahhab started Islam Prachar, a monthly magazine. This was the first Deobandi monthly in the Bengali language. In January 1952, he founded the Monthly Muinul Islam magazine, which serves as a mouthpiece for the institution. Previously, Abdul Wahhab had also founded the Daily Pasban magazine in Dhaka.

In 1961, he established An-Nadi ath-Thaqafi, which was the first Deobandi student organization dedicated to arts, literature, and culture.

Abdul Wahhab founded the Ashrafia Library in 1954, named after his mentor Ashraf Ali Thanvi. This non-profit library provided books from Lebanon, Egypt, Saudi Arabia, India, and other countries at low cost. Abdul Wahhab later donated the books to the Darul Uloom Muinul Islam Central Library and established a postal department.

During the Hathazari turmoil in 1941, the British government closed the madrasa, locking up the office and classrooms and filing a case against the institution. During this crisis, Abdul Wahhab sold a significant portion of his property to manage the legal case. The British government lost the case, and re-development of the madrasa began within a year. Abdul Wahhab is said to have cleared the grass and weeds, cleaned the cattle waste, and used his clothes and sheets to clean the classrooms on his own. He is also said to have recorded the names of re-admitted students in the registry book himself. Some described him as the second architect of Darul Uloom Hathazari.

From 1948 to 1971, he served as a juror at the Chittagong Court.

In the 1970s, Abdul Wahhab created a medical training program. His eldest son-in-law, Dr. Nurul Haq, was appointed to cover modern medical services, while Abdul Haq Bari Sali was responsible for hakimi. Additionally, Al Jamia Al Islamia Patiya began its Community Health Workers training program. Abdul Wahhab was once treated at Chittagong General Hospital by Muhammad Ibrahim . Ibrahim, who founded BIRDEM and the Diabetic Association of Bangladesh, later claimed that Abdul Wahhab had inspired him.

== Literary sponsorship ==
A weekly tafsir gathering was introduced at Anderkilla Shahi Jame Mosque under the direction of Shah Abdul Wahhab. Starting in the 1960s, this style spread across Chittagong and became popular. Following his instruction, Mufti Ahmadul Haq and Abul Hasan Babunagari gave speeches on Mondays and Wednesdays. Subsequently, large events were held in various locations, including Chittagong. He later initiated monthly and bi-monthly specialized gatherings, such as National Seerat Conferences and National Qira'at Conferences.

Muhammad Faizullah granted Abdul Wahhab the title of Hakim an-Nafs. During the Hathazari turmoil, he was given the title of Rijal al-Asr. His leadership in the Hathazari movement led him to be referred to as Amir al-Ulama. During a Jamiat Ulema-e-Islam conference in Laldighi on 31 January 1949, Shabbir Ahmad Usmani conferred upon him the title of Imam al-Mukhlisin, and Zafar Ahmad Usmani gave him the title of Hakim al-Islam. During a scholar's conference, Khalifa-e-Kandhlawi Maulana Zubair referred to him as Qutb al-Irshad.

After the first Shaykhul Hadith Saeed Ahmad Sandwipi left Hathazari, Shah Abdul Wahhab travelled to India in 1942–43 to find a replacement. He brought Ibrahim Balyavi, the senior muhaddith of Darul Uloom Deoband, to Hathazari with a monthly wage of 500 takas. Balyavi served as Shaykh Ul Hadith for 2.5–3 years before returning to Deoband. Before his departure, Balyavi is quoted as saying, "Where there is a Yaqub (former Shaykhul Hadith of Hathazari), there is no need for an Ibrahim".

Abdul Wahhab advised Shamsul Haque Faridpuri, who eventually established the Emdadia Library in Dhaka and the Islamia Library in Chittagong. Contributions to the development and spread of lithography and technology among Deobandis have been attributed to him. Abdul Wahhab has been cited as the main inspiration behind Tanzeem al-Ashtat, an explanation of Mishkat al-Masabih by Abul Hasan Babunagari. Towards the end of the 1940s, the original manuscript was prepared from the text provided to Shah Abdul Wahhab. Abdul Wahhab published and promoted Faiz al-Kalam by Muhammad Faizullah. Shah Abdul Wahhab is also listed as a primary contributor behind Fatawa-e-Darul Uloom Hathazari. With his advice, Mufti Ahmadul Haq of Hathazari began the work of saving and compiling the issued fatwas from Hathazari.

Although Shah Abdul Wahhab did not author any original books, he composed poetry. His work primarily focused on ethical themes and was grounded in Ta‘alluq Ma‘ Allah (the relationship between the Creator and creation). In addition to encouraging poetic practice, he also served as a patron of the art. He would often begin a poem by writing the first line and then challenge a member of An-Nadi ath-Thaqafi to supply the second; those who succeeded received a reward, and those who did not saw him complete the verse himself. Azizul Haq and Siddiq Ahmad would compete in these poetry competitions, making them more competitive when they visited Hathazari.

== Political and social works ==
The declaration of making Bengali one of the state languages of Pakistan in the manifesto of the Nizam-e-Islam Party was written under the direction of Shah Abdul Wahhab. During his tenure as vice-president of Jamiat Ulema-e-Islam, he was a patron of Islamic politics in East Pakistan. He protested against West Pakistani injustice in the grounds of Darul Uloom Hathazari. He organized the collective effort by ulama against the "Muslim Family Laws" bill proposed by President Ayub Khan.

He was a patron of Muhammadullah Hafezzi and his Tawba politics. His activities included contributions to the establishment of the Islamic University, Bangladesh, and the Baitul Mukarram National Mosque, initiating and sponsoring the Tablighi Jamaat movement in Bangladesh and Myanmar, leadership during the establishment of Befaqul Madarisil Arabia Bangladesh, and advocating for social issues such as widow remarriage, safe female education, and care for orphans.

Shah Abdul Wahhab was invited by Ibn Saud to Saudi Arabia in 1939. He represented the Qawmi scholars at the Lahore Resolution in 1940. Following the Partition of Bengal in 1947, Shah Abd al-Wahhab toured the Muslim world, visiting countries such as Myanmar, Egypt, and other African countries. He played a role in the development of Islam in South Africa. Shah Abdul Wahhab was invited to Al-Azhar University, where he made arrangements for Bengali-speaking students to study and research. These arrangements are still in effect today. He was also invited to the Makkah conference.

During the Bangladesh Liberation War of 1971, he arranged a special langar khana for those in danger regardless of religion. It is said that he had the longest and biggest dastarkhan in Bengal.

== Madrasa establishing ==
Among the madrasas established under the influence or direct initiative of Shah Abdul Wahhab are:

1. Jamia Arabia Darul Hidayah Pesha, Naogaon (1946)
2. Jamia Islamia Arabia Mazahirul Uloom, Chittagong (1947)
3. Jamia Islamia Mahmudia, Barisal (1947)
4. Jamia Arabia Mohiul Islam Noapara, Jessore (1948)
5. Darul Hadith Madrasa, Nawabganj (1950)
6. Madrasa Madrasa, Hathazari, Chittagong (1955)
7. Hakimia Madrasa (Chittagong Tablighi Markaz Madrasa), Love Lane, Chittagong (1955)
8. Jamia Izazia Darul Uloom Rail Station, Jessore (1956)
9. Jamia Islamia Qasimul Uloom, Bogra (1960)
10. Jamia Islamia Nawabganj (1967)
11. Jamia Islamia Arabia Darul Uloom Khulna (1967)
12. Jamia Arabia Shamsul Uloom Faridpur (1969)
13. Madrasa Ihya Ul Uloom Halishahar, Chittagong (1970)
14. Darul Uloom Deyang Pahar, Daulatpur, Chittagong (1974)
15. Madrasa Kashiful Uloom Khandaqia, Chittagong (1977)
16. Madrasa Mahmoodia Madinatul Uloom Bathua, Chittagong (1977)
17. Madrasa Mohiul Islam, Garduara, Hathazari, Chittagong (1977)
18. Muhammadia Madrasa, Hatirpul, Chandgaon, Chittagong (1980)

In response to Shah Abdul Wahhab's advice, Athar Ali Bengali established the Imdadul Uloom Madrasa in Kishoreganj in 1945. In 1956, at the initiative of Shah Abdul Wahhab, Shamsul Haque Faridpuri founded the Jamia Arabia Imdadul Uloom Faridabad madrasa in Dhaka. Shah Abdul Wahhab appointed Muhammadullah Hafezzi as its director. With his encouragement and guidance, numerous madrasahs, maktabs, mosques, and khanqahs were established in remote areas, including in the country's divisional towns.

== Death and legacy ==
Shah Abdul Wahhab died on 2 June, 1982, at the age of either 87 or 88. He had five sons and eight daughters. His janaza was led by Muhammadullah Hafezzi, and he was buried at the Maqbara-e-Habibi near Masjid Noor in Hathazari.
