= Muhibbullah Babunagari =

Bangladeshi Islamic scholar

Mujahid-e Millat, Allama Muhibbullah Babunagari
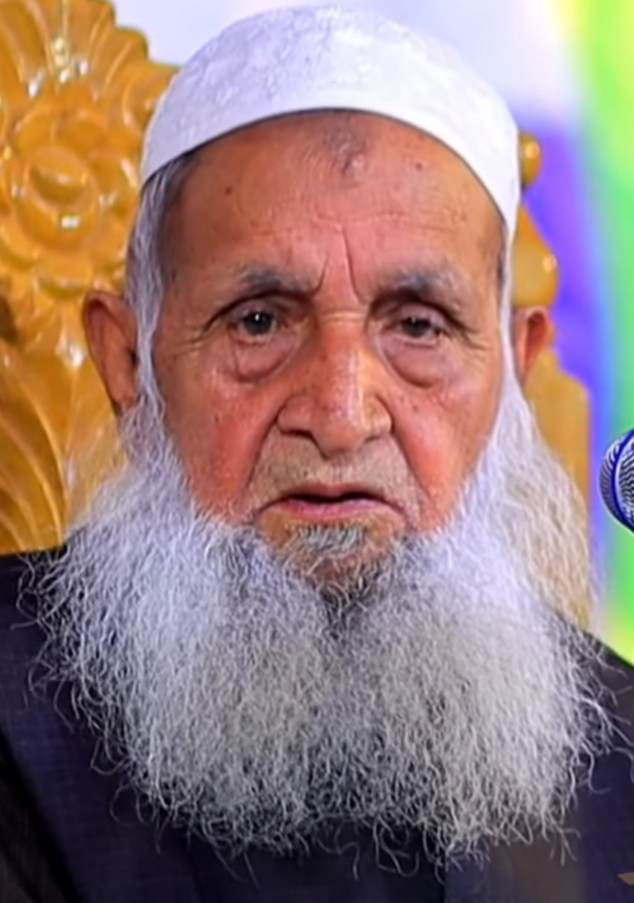
- Babunagari in 2024

Emir of Hefazat-e-Islam Bangladesh
- Incumbent
- Assumed office 19 August 2021
- Secretary General: Sajidur Rahman
- Preceded by: Junaid Babunagari

Rector, Al-Jamiatul Islamiah Azizul Uloom Babunagar
- Incumbent
- Assumed office 1986
- Preceded by: Harun Babunagari

Personal details
- Born: 15 February 1934 (age 92) Babunagar, Daulatpur, Fatikchhari, Chittagong
- Spouse: Miriam Begum (m. 1960–2021)
- Children: 3 sons, 6 daughters
- Education: Darul Uloom Deoband; Al-Jamiatul Ahlia Darul Ulum Moinul Islam; Al-Jamiatul Islamiah Azizul Uloom Babunagar

Personal life
- Parent: Harun Babunagari (father)
- Era: Modern
- Relatives: Sufi Azizur Rahman (grandfather); Junaid Babunagari (nephew)

Religious life
- Religion: Islam
- Denomination: Sunni
- Lineage: Abu Bakr
- Jurisprudence: Hanafi
- Movement: Deobandi

Muslim leader
- Teacher: Hussain Ahmad Madani; Sultan Ahmad Nanupuri; Syed Fakhruddin Ahmad

Muhibbullah Babunagari (born 15 February 1934) is a Bangladeshi Islamic scholar. He is the current and 3rd amir of Hefazat-e-Islam Bangladesh, rector of Al-Jamiatul Islamiah Azizul Uloom Babunagar. He also held leading positions in Islami Oikya Jote, Befaqul Madarisil Arabia Bangladesh and Al-Haiatul Ulya Lil-Jamiatil Qawmia Bangladesh. He is considered one of the pioneers of Deobandi movement in Bangladesh.

== Early life and family ==
Muhibullah was born on 15 February 1934 in the village of Babunagar in Fatikchhari Thana, Chittagong District, East Bengal, Pakistan (now Bangladesh) to a Bengali Muslim family of theologians. His father was Harun Babunagari, the founder of Al-Jamiatul Islamiah Azizul Uloom Babunagar.

== Education ==
Babunagari studied at his father's institute, Al-Jamiatul Islamiah Azizul Uloom Babunagar, until class 8 (Jamat-e-Chaharum). He then proceeded to study at the Al-Jamiatul Ahlia Darul Ulum Moinul Islam in Hathazari from class 9 (Hidayah Awwalain). To pursue his Islamic studies to a further level, Babunagari left Bengal to enrol at the Darul Uloom Deoband in Uttar Pradesh, India. In Deoband, Babunagari enrolled in class 9 (Hidayah Awwalain) again. In 1959, he completed Hadith studies at the institute. He studied Hidayah Akhirain under Husain Ahmad Madani, Sahih al-Bukhari under Syed Fakhruddin Ahmad, Sahih Muslim and Jami' al-Tirmidhi under Ibrahim Balyawi and Sunan Abu Dawood under Fakhrul Hasan.

== Career ==
After returning to Bengal following his studies, Babunagari began teaching at Al-Jamiatul Islamiah Azizul Uloom Babunagar, and became vice-principal in 1986.

On 15 November 2020, he was elected Chief Adviser to Hefazat-e-Islam Bangladesh. Earlier, he was the vice-president of this organization. On 19 August 2021, Muhibbullah Babunagari took office as the new Amir of Hefazat-e-Islam Bangladesh.

== Politics and views ==
He was a presidium member of Islami Andolan Bangladesh during the lifetime of Charmonai Pir Fazlul Karim. During the lifetime of Fazlul Haque Amini, he was associated with Islami Oikya Jote and Islamic Law Implementation Committee. Later he was elected vice-president of Islami Oikya Jote. He resigned from Islami Oikya Jote in 2018.

=== Stance on Awami League ===
In September 2021, Babunagari commented saying 'there is no objection even if the Awami League stays in power for 200 years'. His statement was viewed in favour of Awami League. He called on the one-point movement during July Uprising. In May 2025, he issued statement supporting immediate ban of the Awami League.

=== Stance on BNP and Jamaat-e-Islami ===
Muhibbullah Babunagari has been a critique of Bangladesh Jamaat-e-Islami due to ideological differences. In October 2024, Babunagari faced criticism for commenting Jamaat-e-Islami not being an Islamic party. He opposed other Qawmi Madrasa based Islamic parties to avoid forming electoral alliance with Jamaat, labelling the party "worst of all wrong sects" and worse "than the Qadianis". His statements drew massive criticism, demanding his resignation. He also made claims that if Jamaat-e-Islami came to power 'If Jamaat comes to power, Qawmi, Deobandi and Sunni madrasas will not exist'. In response, JI condemned the statement, pointing its active involvement in establishing numerous Qawmi madrasa throughout the country. In October 2025, Babunagari urged voting against Jamaat-e-Islami in the election. In 2026 general election Babunagari issued fatwa that declared voting Bangladesh Jammat-i-Islami to be haram for Muslims further stating "We are waging jihad against Mawdudi's Jamaat, putting [the BNP candidate] forward. I do not understand elections. This is jihad." He supported Bangladesh Nationalist Party politician, Sarowar Alamgir for Chittagong-2 constituency. Post election, Muhibbullah Babunagari pressured four of the Qawmi madrasa based political parties to abandon Jamaat-e-Islami led alliance and maintained cordial relation with Bangladesh Nationalist Party.

Babunagari demanded official government ban and crackdown on the outlawed organization Hezbut Tawhid. He is advocate for Muslim rights in India.

== Personal life ==
Muhibbullah Babunagari fathered three sons and eight daughters. He was married to Maryam Begum. She died in 2021 at the age of 77 after contracting Coronavirus.

== See also ==
- List of Deobandis
