= Abdul Wahid Bengali =

Deobandi IslamicScholar from Bengal

Shaykh al-Kul Abdul Wahid Bengali
- Title: Munazer-e-Islam, Mujahid-e-Azam, Olikul Shiromoni

Personal life
- Born: 1850 Kharandwip, Boalkhali, Chittagong District
- Died: 1905 (aged 54–55)
- Resting place: Munshipara, Kharandwip, Boalkhali
- Main interest(s): Hadith, fiqh, tasawwuf
- Notable work: Al-Jamiatul Ahlia Darul Ulum Moinul Islam
- Education: Darul Uloom Deoband

Religious life
- Religion: Islam
- Denomination: Sunni
- Jurisprudence: Hanafi
- Movement: Deobandi

Muslim leader
- Students: Shah Ahmad Hasan
- Influenced by: Qasim Nanautavi Fazlur Rahman Ganj-e-Muradabadi Yaqub Nanautawi
- Influenced: Sufi Azizur Rahman Abdul Hamid Madarshahi

Abdul Wahid Bengali (Bengali: আব্দুল ওয়াহেদ বাঙ্গালী; c. 1850–1905) was a 19th-century Muslim theologian, teacher and social reformer. He was one of the initiators of the Deobandi movement into Bengal, and co-founded Al-Jamiatul Ahlia Darul Ulum Moinul Islam in 1896.

== Early life and family ==
Abdul Wahid was born in 1268 Hijri (1851—1852 CE), to a Bengali Muslim family in the village of Haola in Kharandwip, Boalkhali, Chittagong District, Bengal Presidency. His father, Shaykh Moulvi Zinat Ali, was a munsef (local judge) at a court in Kaukhali, Rangunia. Ali was fluent in Bengali, English, Arabic, Persian and Urdu.

== Education ==
Abdul Wahid initially studied with his father, Zinat Ali, before joining the Sarwatali High School. In addition to Bengali, he became proficient in Urdu too. He stayed in this school until class 8, when he realised the importance of studying the Quran, Hadith and the Arabic language after reading a book in Urdu. Instead of proceeding with the colonial education system that taught English, Abdul Wahid turned towards Arabic. In response, people close to him began to mock him. However, he was certain in his goals and left his village for Calcutta, where his father's friend lived. He expressed his desire of learning Arabic to his father's friend. The man then wrote a letter to Zinat Ali of his son's situation and desire and Abdul Wahid was subsequently enrolled at the Muhsinia Madrasa in Chittagong.

=== In Deoband ===
His neighbours continued to criticise the fact that the son of a judge was studying Arabic. Eventually, Abdul Wahid set off for North India without telling anyone and joined the Darul Uloom Deoband. In Deoband, he dedicated his time to religious studies to such a level that he would often not reply to letters that he received from home.

He had enrolled at the prestigious seminary only 5–6 years after its establishment. He was one of the only two students of Qasim Nanautavi and Yaqub Nanautawi that were from eastern Bengal at the time. The other student was Ubaydul Hakim, who also belonged to the village of Kharandwip. After 14 years at Deoband, Abdul Wahid graduated from the Faculty of Hadith (Masters).

After both of them completed their formal education at Deoband, the two expressed their desire to study tasawwuf under Qasim Nanautavi. Nanautavi instead directed them towards Imdadullah Muhajir Makki. However, after he migrated to Mecca, they pledged bay'ah to Fazlur Rahman Ganj-e-Muradabadi. They spent an additional two years under him, eventually gaining khilafah (spiritual succession). At that time Abdul Wahid received a letter from his mother mentioning that his father had died. His mother urged him to return home, thus Abdul Wahid returned to Bengal after 16 years.

== Personal life ==
His mother arranged for a marriage fearing that Abdul Wahid might move abroad again. He was engaged to a noblewoman from Kadalpur in Raozan. In this marriage, Abdul Wahid had one daughter, Shakirah Khatun, and two sons, Sulayman and Ayyub. However, Abdul Wahid felt that his wife was not religiously devoted. After he failed in repeatedly trying to persuade her to become more practicing, he returned her to her parents' home. From there, he did not return to his home but rather set off to the home of his close friend Sufi Azizur Rahman in Babunagar, Fatikchhari.

Abdul Wahid's second marriage occurred through the assistance of Sufi Azizur Rahman. He married a woman from Nazirhat and temporary leased some land from a man to the west of the Dhurang canal in Babunagar. He had a daughter with this wife.

== Career ==
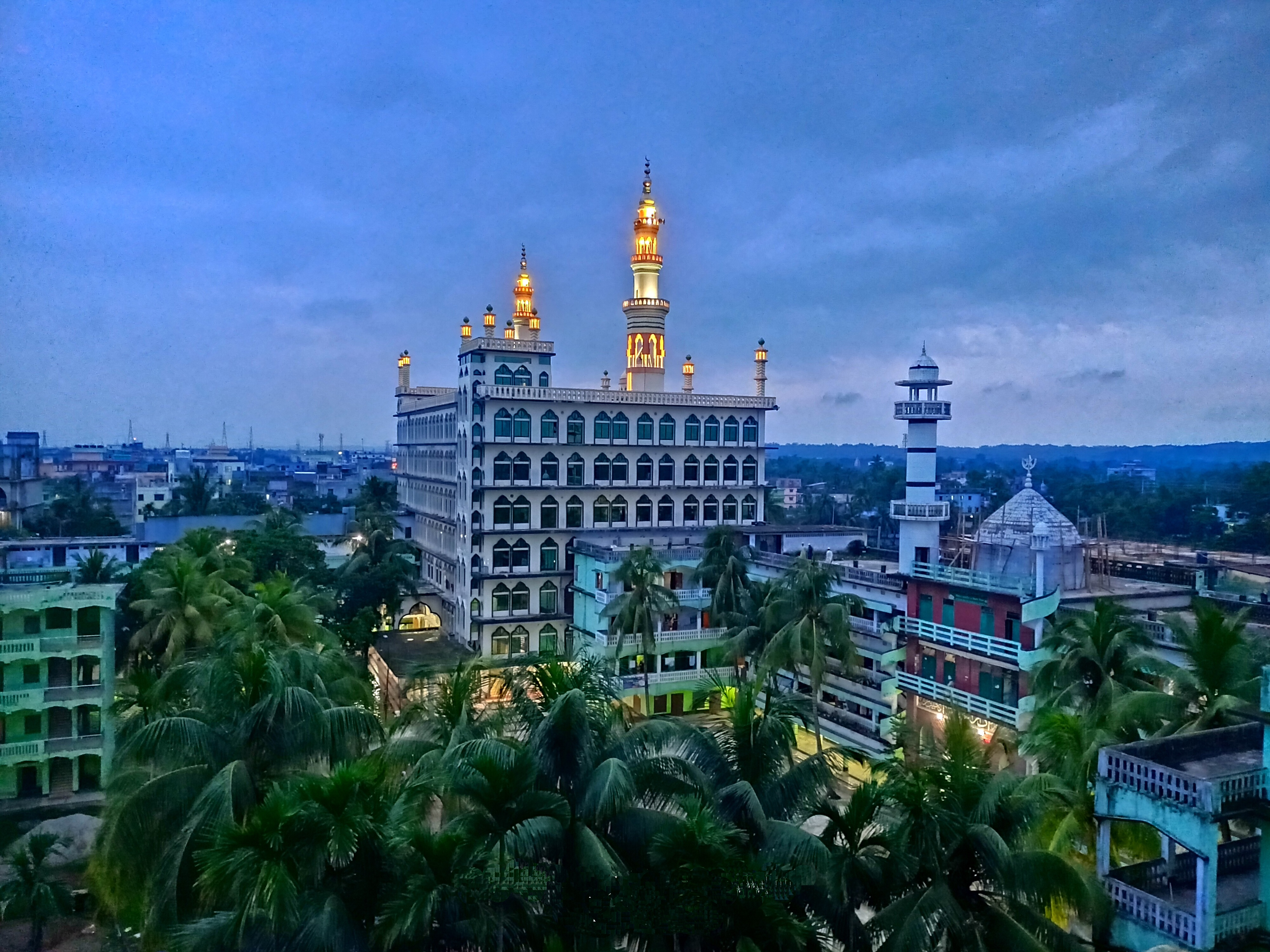
Al-Jamiatul Ahlia Darul Ulum Moinul Islam is the largest and oldest Deobandi seminary in Bangladesh, and ranks among the top ten madrasas of the subcontinent.

After returning to Bengal, Abdul Wahid started a tupi business in Chittagong. He also began teaching Islamic studies in the village of Babunagar along with Sufi Azizur Rahman. In 1896, the two co-founded Al-Jamiatul Ahlia Darul Ulum Moinul Islam in Hathazari along with Habibullah Qurayshi and Abdul Hamid Madarshahi. Abdul Wahid became a teacher of tajwid at the madrasa. In 1908, he began teaching Kutub al-Sittah at the madrasa.

== Death and legacy ==
He died in 1905, at the age of 55. His janaza was performed by Habibullah Qurayshi and he was buried in his paternal graveyard (now known as al-Maqbarah al-Wahidiyyah) in Munshipara, Kharandwip. To the east of his grave, a madrasa was established in his name as Wahidia Madrasa. Among his biographers, Mawlana Jafar Sadiq is notable.

== See also ==
- List of Deobandis
