= Mufti Faizullah =

Mufti Faizullah is a name commonly used to refer to two different Bangladeshi individuals:

- Muhammad Faizullah, noted for his expertise in fiqh and for serving as the head mufti of Darul Uloom Hathazari
- Fayez Ullah, known as a politician affiliated with the Islami Oikya Jote
