= Nurul Islam Jihadi =

Bangladeshi Islamic scholar (1948–2021)

Allama Nurul Islam Jihadi
- নুরুল ইসলাম জিহাদী

Secretary General, Hefazat-e-Islam Bangladesh
- In office 26 December 2020 – 29 November 2021
- Preceded by: Nur Hossain Kasemi
- Succeeded by: Sajidur Rahman

Chancellor, Al Jamiatul Islamia Makhjanul Uloom
- In office 10 July 1984 – ????

Secretary General, International Majlis-e Tahaffuz-e-Khatm-e Nobuwat Bangladesh
- In office 1990–????

Personal life
- Born: 1948 Fatikchhari Upazila, Chittagong District, East Bengal, Pakistan
- Died: 29 November 2021 (aged 72–73)
- Parent: Abdur Rashid (father)
- Era: Modern
- Main interest(s): Hadith, Fiqh, Writing, Tasawwuf, Islamic history, Islamic Movement, Khatam an-Nabiyyin
- Notable works: Al Jamiatul Islamia Makhjanul Uloom; International Majlis-e Tahaffuz-e-Khatm-e Nobuwat Bangladesh (1990); Jamia Khatamunnabiyyin, United Kingdom; Islamic Movement Council (1978); Tajkera-e Khatib-e Azam
- Education: Darul Uloom Hathazari; Al Jamiatul Arabia Nasirul Islam

Religious life
- Religion: Islam
- Denomination: Sunni
- Jurisprudence: Hanafi
- Movement: Deobandi

Muslim leader
- Influenced by: Muhammad Faizullah, Shah Ahmad Shafi
- Influenced: Mamunul Haque

Nurul Islam Jihadi (Bengali: নুরুল ইসলাম জিহাদী; 1948 – 29 November 2021) was a Bangladeshi Deobandi Islamic scholar, educator and spiritual figure. He was the Secretary General of Hefazat-e-Islam Bangladesh and International Majlis-e Tahaffuz-e-Khatm-e Nobuwat Bangladesh, Chancellor and Shaykh al-Hadith of Al Jamiatul Islamia Makhjanul Uloom. He was also a member of the Majlis-e-Shura of Darul Uloom Hathazari and Befaqul Madarisil Arabia Bangladesh, founder and patron of many mosques and madrasas, including Jamia Khatamunnabiyyin in the United Kingdom.

== Name and lineage ==
Jihadi was born in 1948 in Fatikchhari, Chittagong District. His father's name was Abdur Rashid.

== Life and career ==
After completing his education, he started his career as a teacher at Kaigram Madrasa in Patiya Upazila. After teaching in Kaigram madrasa for one year, he was called to Babunagar madrasa and became a teacher there. After teaching at Babunagar Madrasa for a few years, he taught at Ashraful Ulum Bara Katara Madrasa in Dhaka till 1982. At this time, after the death of his father, he went to his home and rejoined Babunagar Madrasa. On 10 July 1984, he founded Al Jamiatul Islamia Makhjanul Uloom in Khilgaon, Dhaka district. He was the Chancellor and Shaykh al-Hadith of this seminary. He served as an important member of Majlis-e-Shura of Darul Uloom Hathazari and Befaqul Madarisil Arabia Bangladesh. In 1966, he founded a non-political organization called "Islamic Movement Council" to resist Islamophobes. He was in the companionship of Siddique Ahmad for a long time. He was the Secretary General of International Majlis-e Tahaffuj-e Khatme Nabuwat Bangladesh, established in 1990 with the aim of accelerating the anti-Ahmadiyya movement and the Khatme Nabuyat movement. On 26 December 2020, he was elected Secretary General of Hefazat-e-Islam Bangladesh following the death of Nur Hossain Kasemi in December 2020. He remained in this post until his death.

Jihadi died on 29 November 2021.

== Publications ==
His books include:

- Akhlak-e Rasul (Saw.)
- Bright stars
- The Qadiani fitna and the position of the Muslim nation
- Rules of Qurbani
- Gulshan-e Nur
- Asmane ilm ki chand darakhsande sitare (Urdu)
- Tazkera-e Khatib-e Azam
- Sheikh Sadi's Advice
- Nukushe Zindegi and Pandey Namaye Nasir
- Qawmi Madrasa, objective method results etc.

== See also ==
- List of Deobandis
