= Harun Babunagari =

Bangladeshi Islamic scholar (1902 – 1986)

- হারুন বাবুনগরী

Principal, Al-Jamiatul Islamiah Azizul Uloom Babunagar
- In office 1924–1986
- Preceded by: post established
- Succeeded by: Muhibbullah Babunagari

Personal details
- Born: 1902 Babunagar, Fatikchhari, Chittagong District
- Died: 18 August 1986 (aged 83–84)
- Resting place: Maqbara-e-Haruni, Al-Jamiatul Islamiah Azizul Uloom Babunagar
- Parent: Sufi Azizur Rahman (father)
- Education: Al-Jamiatul Ahlia Darul Ulum Moinul Islam; Al-Jamia al-Arabia Nasirul Islam Nazirhat

Personal life
- Children: Muhibbullah Babunagari
- Era: 20th-century
- Relatives: Junaid Babunagari (grandson)

Religious life
- Religion: Islam
- Denomination: Sunni
- Jurisprudence: Hanafi
- Movement: Deobandi

Senior posting
- Influenced by: Azizul Haq Zamiruddin Ahmad Habibullah Qurayshi Sufi Azizur Rahman Mufti Faizullah
- Influenced: Muhibbullah Babunagari Junaid Babunagari Muzharul Islam

Harun Babunagari (Bengali: হারুন বাবুনগরী; 1902–1986; often referred to as Buzurgo Saheb) was a Bangladeshi Deobandi Islamic scholar, Sufi, and an exegete of the Quran. He was the founder and first Principal of Al-Jamiatul Islamiah Azizul Uloom Babunagar, one of the oldest Qawmi madrasas in Bangladesh.

== Early life and education ==
Harun Babunagari was born in 1902 to a Bengali Muslim family in the village of Babunagar in Fatikchhari, Chittagong District. His father, Sufi Azizur Rahman, was the founder of Al-Jamiatul Ahlia Darul Ulum Moinul Islam in Hathazari, and traced his ancestry to Caliph Abu Bakr. Babunagari had three other siblings, most notably Amin, a former head of the Hadith studies department at Al-Jamiatul Islamiah Azizul Uloom Babunagar.

He completed his primary education at a primary school in Babunagar. He studied various subjects there, including Saadi Shirazi's Gulistan - the most influential Persian prose in history. His father, Sufi Azizur Rahman, used to also teach him the Quran at home. After completing his primary studies, Babunagari joined Al-Jamia al-Arabia Nasirul Islam in Nazirhat Bazar, which was founded by his father, who also taught there. He studied there up until Kafiya.

In Muharram 1341 AH (August/September 1922), Babunagari enrolled at Al-Jamiatul Ahlia Darul Ulum Moinul Islam in Hathazari, which was also founded by his father. Due to family circumstances, he only studied up until Dawra-e-Hadith (Masters) and only learning up until Jamat-e-Ula Mishkat Sharif. He later completed studying Sihah Sittah with his elder brother, Amin.

== Career and spirituality ==
Following the death of his father, Sufi Azizur Rahman, in 1922, Babunagari decided to fulfill his dreams. At the age of only 22, he established Al-Jamiatul Islamiah Azizul Uloom Babunagar in 1924. He served as the madrasa's principal up until his death in 1986.

He also served as a murid to Zamiruddin Ahmad for 18 years. After the latter's death, he turned to Azizul Haq. During a gathering at the Hathazari eidgah, Haque stood up during Babunagari's speech and declared that he has given him permission of the four tariqa.

== Personal life and death ==
Babunagari married Umme Salma and had five children. His eldest child, Muhibbullah Babunagari, succeeded him in his roles after his death. His daughter, Fatimah Khatun, was the mother of Junaid Babunagari.

He died on 18 August 1986 at the Chittagong Medicare Clinic. His janaza was performed the next day, led by his son Muhibbullah Babunagari. He was subsequently buried at the Maqbara-e-Haruni in the southern part of his madrasa in Babunagar.

== See more ==
- List of Deobandis
