= Abdul Hamid (scholar) =

Bengali Islamic scholar and educationist

Fakhr al-Islām Abdul Hamid Madarshahi

Personal life
- Born: 1869 North Madarsha, Hathazari, Chittagong District
- Died: 31 March 1920 (aged 50–51) Bengal Province
- Notable work: Al-Jamiatul Ahlia Darul Ulum Moinul Islam
- Education: Mohsinia Madrasa

Religious life
- Religion: Islam
- Denomination: Sunni
- Jurisprudence: Hanafi
- Movement: Deobandi

Muslim leader
- Students: Muhammad Faizullah
- Influenced by: Abdul Wahid Bengali
- Influenced: Shah Ahmad Hasan

Abdul Hamid was a Bengali Islamic scholar, author and educationist. He was one of the pioneers of introducing the Deobandi movement in Bengal and is noted for being one of the founding fathers of Al-Jamiatul Ahlia Darul Ulum Moinul Islam in Hathazari.

== Early life and education ==
Abdul Hamid was born in 1869 to a Bengali Muslim family of the village of North Madarsha in Hathazari, Chittagong District, Bengal Presidency, they are a landed clan. His parents were Rustam Ali Munshi and Begum Suajan. He traces his lineage to Sheikh Muhammad Hafeez, who is claimed to be an Arab Muslim missionary who had arrived at the Port of Chittagong centuries prior, initially settling in the Jahanabad mahalla of Sitakunda where he established himself as a local zamindar (landowner). As the result of a local epidemic, Hafeez's descendant Sheikh Murad migrated to the village of Baroauliya, and Murad's descendant Sheikh Shamsher Ali Taluqdar settled in his maternal home in Madarsha, Hathazari.

Madarshahi's early education began at his home and later at the local maktab, where he gained religious education and learnt the Qur'an. He then joined the local primary school until class five, later enrolling at the Mohsinia Madrasa in Chittagong city. It is said that he topped the class exams every year at the Mohsinia Madrasa. He completed books such as the Mishkat al-Masabih in this madrasa.

== Career ==
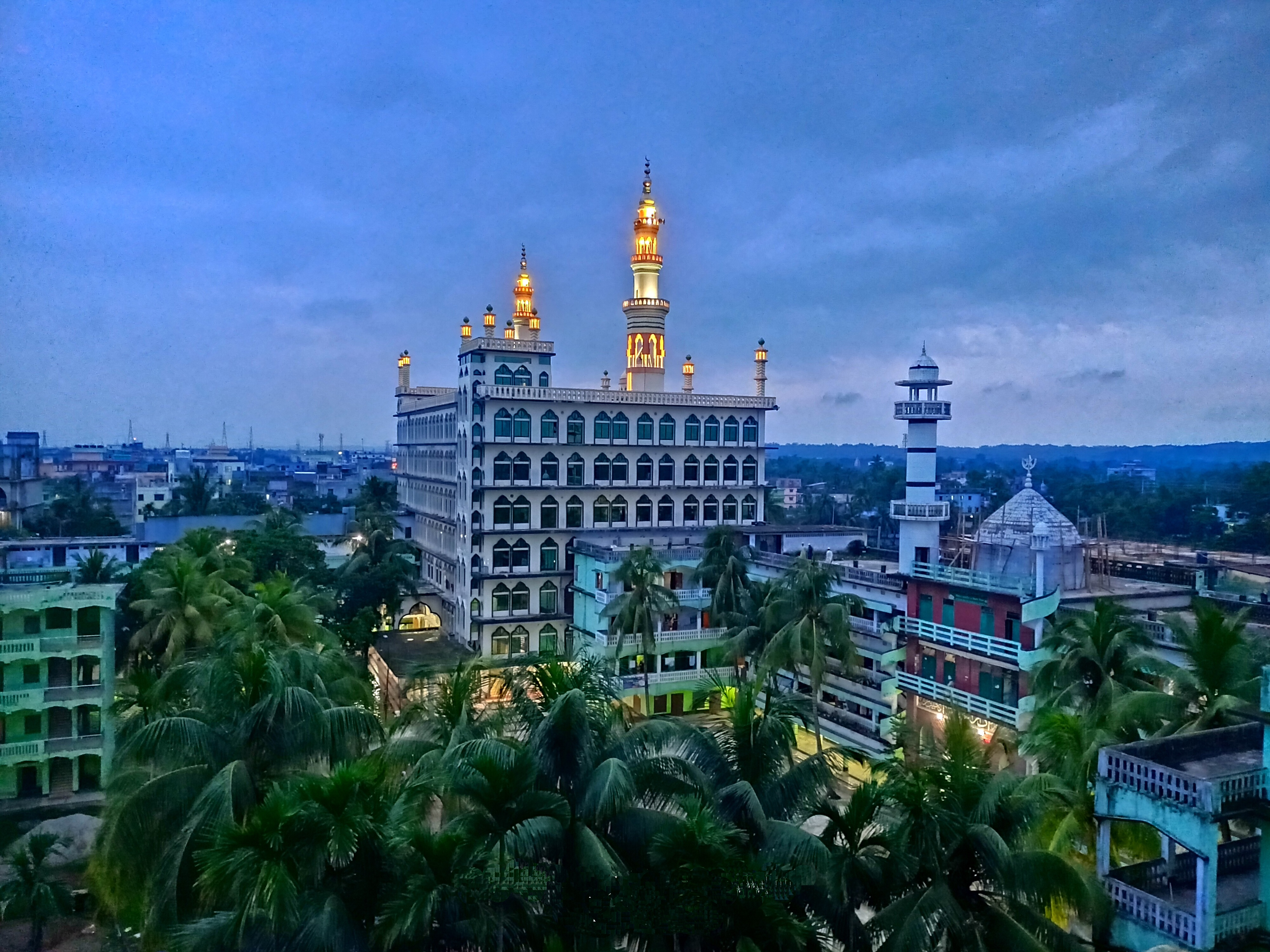
Al-Jamiatul Ahlia Darul Ulum Moinul Islam is the largest and oldest Deobandi seminary in Bangladesh, and ranks among the top ten madrasas of the subcontinent.

During his time at the Mohsinia Madrasa, Madarshahi was familiarised with Abdul Wahid Bengali and became greatly influenced by him, eventually co-operating in his reformation movement. He participated in various religious seminars and debate conferences, and started to become known as a debater. Thereafter, he was bestowed the title of Fakhr al-Islām (Glory of Islam) and Munāẓir-e-Islām (Debater of Islam). From very early on, he founded a small maktab in Khandaqia where he provided religious education to children, as well as the elderly. Madarshahi also played an important role in establishing maktabs in other areas.

In 1896, he co-founded Al-Jamiatul Ahlia Darul Ulum Moinul Islam along with Abdul Wahid Bengali, Sufi Azizur Rahman and Habibullah Qurayshi, after realising the importance of having a madrasa in colonial Bengal. The madrasa was founded along with the assistance of locals too. Madarshahi also established another large madrasa in nearby Fatehpur, known as al-Jāmiʿah al-Ḥamīdiyyah Nāṣir al-Islām.

== Works ==
Hamid has written several works pertaining to Islam. These include:

1. Tuḥfah al-Mu'minīn (A Gift to the Believers)
2. Masā'il-i-Ramaḍān (Issues pertaining to Ramadan)
3. Faḍā'il-i-ʿĪdgāh (Virtues of the Eidgah)
4. Faḍā'il-i-Iʿtikāf (Virtues of the Iʿtikāf)

== Death and legacy ==
Hamid died on 31 March 1920. He had two sons; Sheikh Muhammad Ismail and Sheikh Muhammad Yusuf.

== See more ==
- List of Deobandis
