= Sufi Azizur Rahman =

British Indian Deobandi Islamic Scholar

Mawlana Sufi Azizur Rahman
- সুফি আজিজুর রহমান

Personal life
- Born: 1862 Babunagar, Fatikchhari, Chittagong District
- Died: 1922 (aged 59–60)
- Children: Harun Babunagari
- Notable work(s): Al-Jamiatul Ahlia Darul Ulum Moinul Islam; Al-Jamia al-Arabia Nasirul Islam Nazirhat
- Education: Mohsinia Madrasa
- Relatives: Muhibbullah Babunagari (grandson); Junaid Babunagari (great grandson)

Religious life
- Religion: Islam
- Denomination: Sunni
- Jurisprudence: Hanafi
- Movement: Deobandi

Muslim leader
- Influenced by: Abdul Wahid Bengali

Ṣūfī ʿAzīzur Raḥmān (Bengali: সুফি আজিজুর রহমান; 1862–1922) was a Muslim theologian, teacher and reformer. After being influenced by Abdul Wahid Bengali in his student life, he became associated with the spread of the Deobandi movement into Bengal. In 1896, he co-founded Al-Jamiatul Ahlia Darul Ulum Moinul Islam.

== Early life and family ==
Azizur Rahman was born in 1862 to a Bengali Muslim family in the village of Babunagar in Fatikchhari, Chittagong District. The family traced their ancestry to Caliph Abu Bakr. In his childhood, he was noted for his cleanliness and humbleness and was nicknamed Sufi Saheb.

His education began in Babunagar, and he later enrolled at the Mohsinia Madrasa in Chittagong. While studying for Jamat-e-Ula, he was introduced to Abdul Wahid Bengali. He was inspired after hearing Bengali's recitation of the Quran, and began regularly reciting the Quran to him. Abdul Wahid subsequently took him to Abdus Samad Pandit for religious homeschooling. Ultimately, Azizur Rahman gained the highest mark in his Jamat-e-Ula exam.

== Career ==
In response to topping the Jamat-e-Ula exams, the Mohsinia Madrasa staff requested Azizur Rahman to remain in the madrasa as a teacher. However, he did not take up this role, as he did not want a job dependent upon the British government. Instead, he joined the anti-colonial Deobandi movement under his mentor Abdul Wahid Bengali. The two joined Habibullah Qurayshi and Abdul Hamid Madarshahi to establish Al-Jamiatul Ahlia Darul Ulum Moinul Islam in Hathazari. Two to three years after its establishment, Azizur Rahman began teaching at the institution and remained in this role for ten to fifteen years.

Azizur Rahman noticed the lack of religious education facilities in Fatikchhari. As a solution, he established Al Jamiatul Arabia Nasirul Islam in Nazirhat Bazar. A few years later, he entrusted the madrasa to Nur Ahmad and left for his ancestral village in Babunagar. His plan was to establish a madrasa in Babunagar.

== Death and legacy ==
Azizur Rahman died in 1922, before he could establish the madrasa of Babunagar. He left behind four children, including Harun Babunagari, who established Al-Jamiatul Islamiah Azizul Uloom Babunagar in his father's owned land. Harun's son is Muhibbullah Babunagari, the incumbent Amir of Hefazat-e-Islam Bangladesh. Azizur Rahman's granddaughter, Fatima Khatun, was the mother of Junaid Babunagari, former Amir of Hefazat-e-Islam Bangladesh.
