= Habibullah Qurayshi =

Bengali Islamic scholar and educationist

Shaykh al-Islām Habibullah Qurayshi
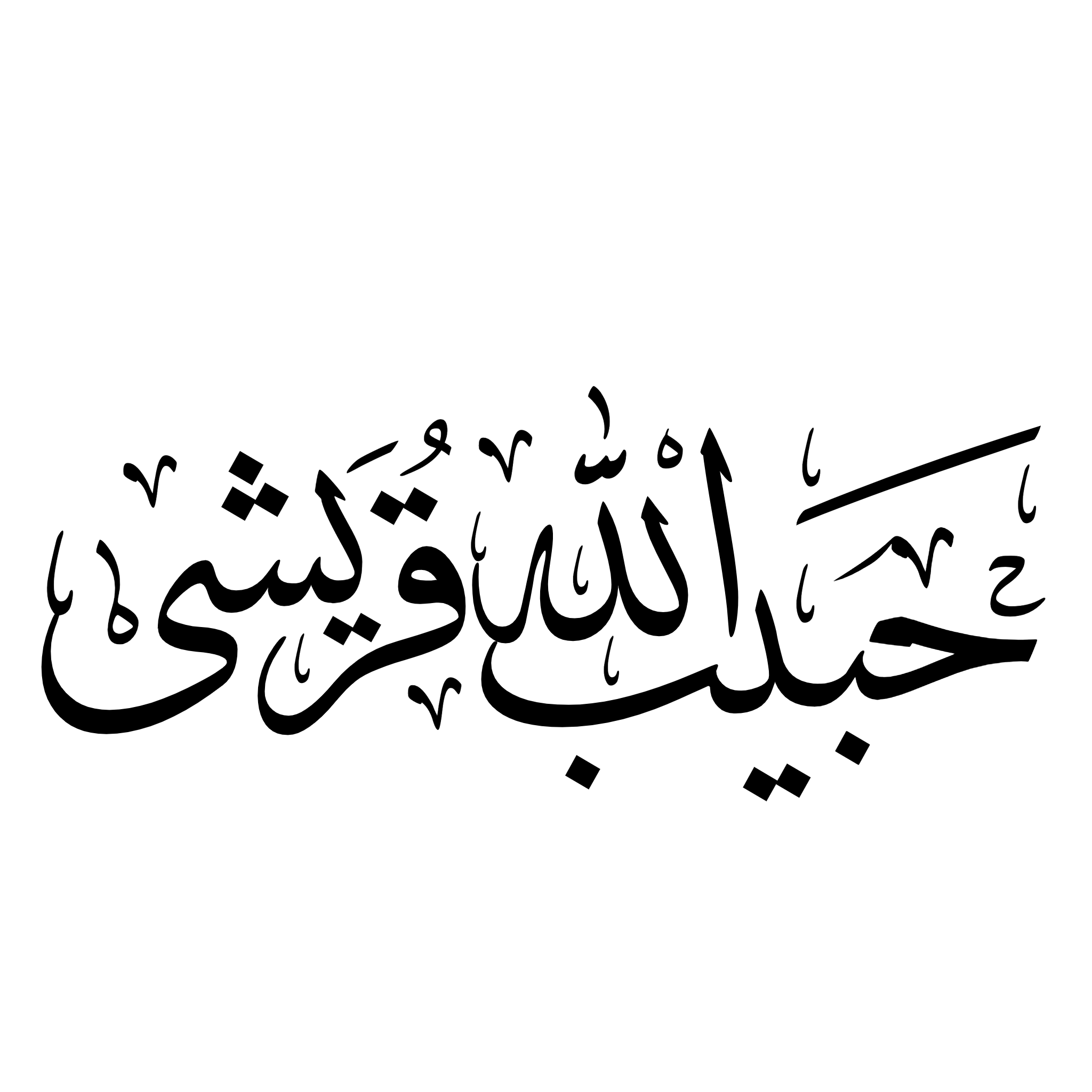

Director-General, Al-Jamiatul Ahlia Darul Ulum Moinul Islam
- In office 1899–1941
- Succeeded by: Shah Abdul Wahhab
- Title: Allama, Boro Moulovi Saheb

Personal life
- Born: 1865 Qazipara, Charia, Hathazari, Chittagong District
- Died: 1943 (aged 77–78)
- Resting place: Maqbara-e-Habibi, Hathazari
- Spouse: 5
- Children: 10
- Parent: Matiullah Mianji Qurayshi (father)
- Notable work: Al-Jamiatul Ahlia Darul Ulum Moinul Islam
- Education: Mohsinia Madrasa; Darul Uloom Deoband; Jamiul Uloom Kanpur

Religious life
- Religion: Islam
- Denomination: Sunni
- Jurisprudence: Hanafi
- Movement: Deobandi

Muslim leader
- Teacher: Mahmud Hasan Deobandi; Ishaq Bardhamani
- Disciple of: Ashraf Ali Thanwi
- Students: Shah Ahmad Hasan
- Influenced by: Abdul Wahid Bengali

Ḥabībullāh Qurayshī (Bengali: হাবিবুল্লাহ কুরাইশি; 1865 – 1943) was a Bengali Islamic scholar and educationist of the Deobandi movement. He was the founding director-general of Al-Jamiatul Ahlia Darul Ulum Moinul Islam.

== Early life and family ==
Habibullah Qurayshi was born in 1865, to the Bengali Muslim Mianji family in Qazipara, Chariya village, Hathazari, Chittagong District. His father, Matiullah Mianji Qurayshi, was an alim. The family traced their ancestry to Marwan ibn al-Hakam, the fourth Umayyad caliph and a member of the Arab tribe of Quraysh. He lost his mother at the age of five, and was the only child of his parents.

== Education ==
Qurayshi first studied the Quran with Imamuddin Mianji and other books with Masiullah. He then enrolled at the Mohsinia Madrasa, which was the only higher Islamic educational institute in Chittagong at the time. After completing Jamat-e-Duam, he proceeded to study at the Darul Uloom Deoband in North India. After spending some time there, he joined the Jameul Uloom in Kanpur, where he spent 7 years studying under Ashraf Ali Thanwi. Completing his education thereon, Qurayshi pledged bay'ah to Thanwi who instructed him to return to Bengal and establish a hujra near his home for spiritual asceticism. In this state, he spent 2 years. Mahmud Hasan Deobandi and Ishaq Bardhamani were also his teachers.

== Career ==
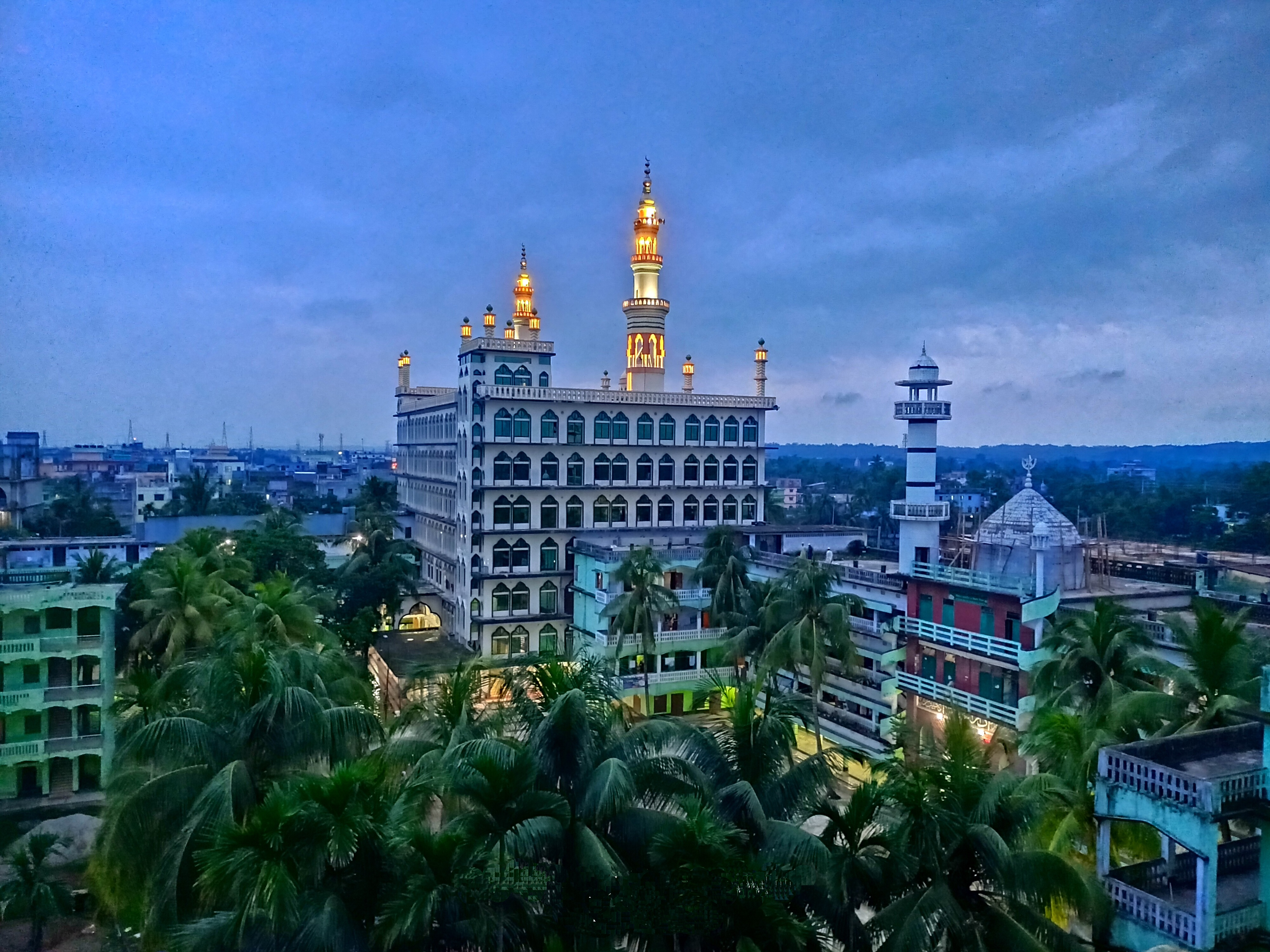
Al-Jamiatul Ahlia Darul Ulum Moinul Islam is the largest and oldest Deobandi seminary in Bangladesh, and ranks among the top ten madrasas of the subcontinent.

Having returned to Chittagong, Qurayshi met Abdul Wahid Bengali, Sufi Azizur Rahman and Abdul Hamid Madarshahi. They discussed the importance of establishing a madrasa. Subsequently, Qurayshi sent a latter to his pir, Ashraf Ali Thanwi, regarding the plans. With the permission of his teacher, Qurayshi established a small building for teaching purposes (now located just west of the present Chariya Madrasa). With the advice of his colleagues, the madrasa was relocated to a place near the present-day Panka Masjid in Hathazari Bazar. For several reasons, there was a need for another relocation. In 1899, he finally co-founded Al-Jamiatul Ahlia Darul Ulum Moinul Islam along with the three scholars and through the assistance of locals. When the scope of work increased over time, Qurayshi became the madrasa's inaugural director-general as instructed by Thanwi. He served in this position until 1941.

== Death ==
Habibullah Qurayshi died in 1943. His janaza was led by Said Ahmad Sandwipi. He was then buried next to the grave of Zamiruddin Ahmad, at the Hathazari Madrasa's central cemetery, and is now known as Maqbara-e-Habibi.

== See also ==
- List of Deobandis
