= Shah Ahmad Hasan =

Islamic scholar from Bengal (1882–1967)

Mujahid-e-Millat Shah Ahmad Hasan
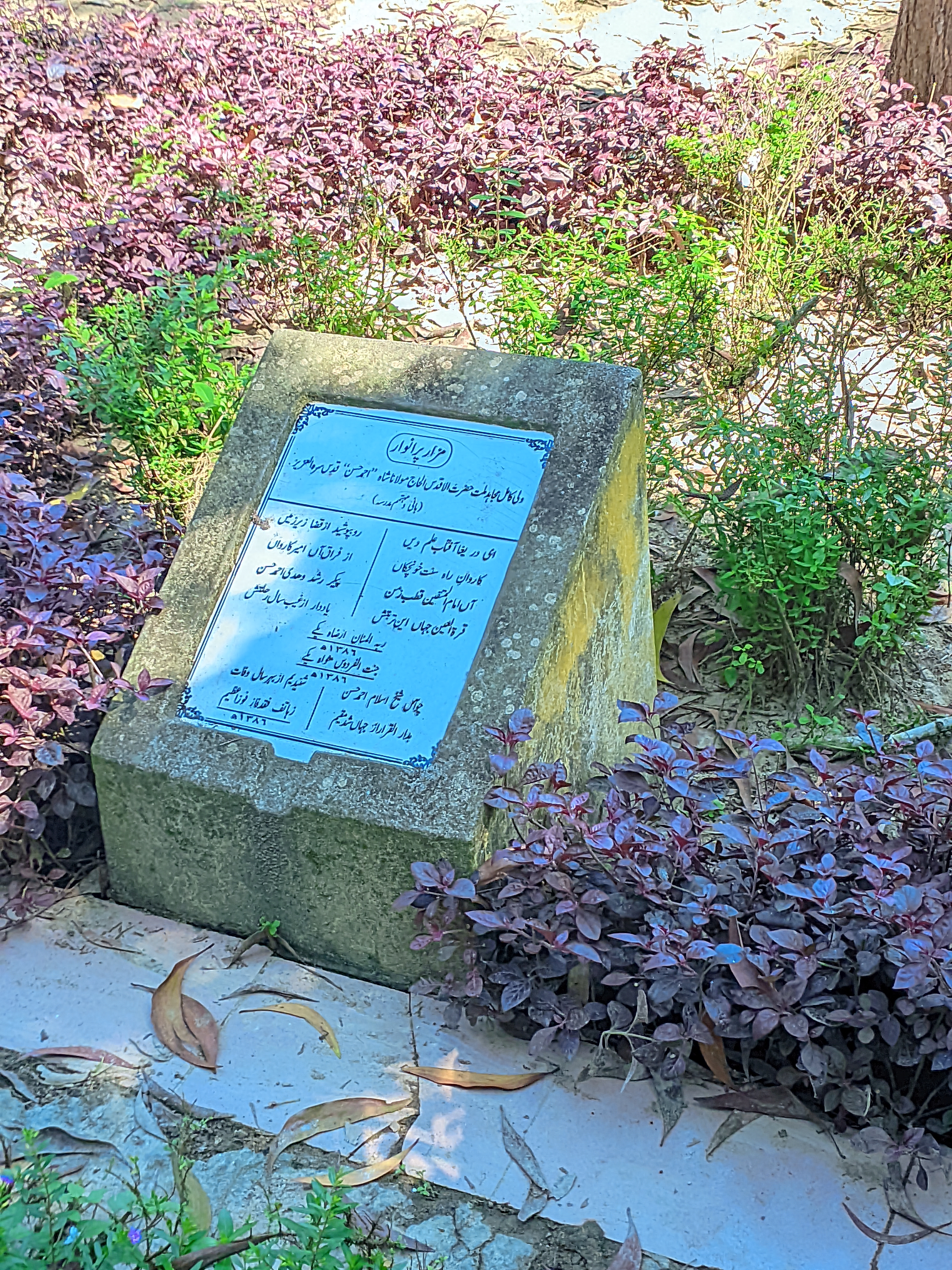
- Hasan's gravestone

Personal details
- Born: 1882 Jiri, Patiya, Chittagong District, Bengal Presidency
- Died: 1967 (aged 84–85) East Pakistan
- Spouse: 4
- Education: Darul Uloom Hathazari
- Main interests: Education; Sufism
- Notable work: Al-Jameatul Arabiatul Islamia Ziri
- Relatives: Hafez Ahmadullah (grandson)

Religious life
- Religion: Islam
- Denomination: Sunni
- Jurisprudence: Hanafi
- Movement: Deobandi

Muslim leader
- Teacher: Habibullah Qurayshi, Zamiruddin Ahmad, Saeed Ahmad Sandwipi
- Disciple of: Ashraf Ali Thanwi; Qazi Muazzam Husayn
- Students: Azizul Haq
- Influenced by: Abdul Hamid Madarshahi

Shah Ahmad Hasan (Bengali: শাহ আহমদ হাসান), was a Bangladeshi Islamic scholar and educationist. He was an early student of Al-Jamiatul Ahlia Darul Ulum Moinul Islam in Hathazari. Hasan established Al-Jameatul Arabiatul Islamia Ziri, which was the second Qawmi madrasa of Bangladesh.

== Early life and education ==
Ahmad Hasan was born in 1882 to a Bengali Muslim family in the village of Jiri in western Patiya under the Chittagong District of the Bengal Presidency. He received his primary education at home from a tutor. He studied the Qur'an and the Persian and Urdu languages with a tutor named Rafiqullah. In 1315 AH (1897-98 CE), Hasan enrolled at the Mohsinia Madrasa, which was the only madrasa in Chittagong. He began systematically studying at the state-run madrasa from Jamaat-e-Dahum. In 1318 AH (1901 CE), the Madrasa Moinul Islam was established in Hathazari, which was the first qawmi madrasa in Bengal. After coming into contact with Abdul Hamid Madarshahi, Hasan was admitted to Hathazari from Jamaat-e-Nahum. Among his teachers in Hathzari were Habibullah Qurayshi and Zamiruddin Ahmad.

== Career ==
Whilst studying as Jamaat-e-Ula at Hathazari, Ashraf Ali of Kaiyagram used to have a jagir in their house. Hasan once came home with him in consultation and decided to establish the second Qawmi madrasa of Bengal. According to the decision, he first started the madrasa education in a shop room. Later, he relocated the madrasa to his village in Jiri.

== Sufism ==
Hasan was a murid of Ashraf Ali Thanwi. After his death, he then became a disciple of Qazi Muazzam Husayn of Mirsarai, a khalifah (spiritual successor) of Rashid Ahmad Gangohi. Shah Ahmad Hasan received the khilafat from Husayn.

== Death and legacy ==
He died in 1967. He was the father of five daughters. Abdul Wadud Sandwipi presided over his janaza. He was buried next to Jiri Madrasa.

== See also ==
- List of Deobandis
