= Junaid Babunagari =

Bangladeshi Islamic scholar

Shaykhul Hadith, Hafez, Qaid-e Millat Mohammad Junaid Babunagari
- Babunagari in 2017

Amir of Hefazat-e-Islam Bangladesh
- In office 15 November 2020 – 19 August 2021
- Preceded by: Shah Ahmad Shafi
- Succeeded by: Muhibbullah Babunagari

Personal life
- Born: 8 October 1953 Babunagar, Chittagong District, Pakistan
- Died: 19 August 2021 (aged 67) Chittagong, Bangladesh
- Resting place: Al-Jamiatul Ahlia Darul Ulum Moinul Islam, Hathazari
- Era: Modern
- Main interests: Hadith; Tafseer; Tasawwuf; Fiqh
- Education: Al-Jamiatul Ahlia Darul Ulum Moinul Islam; Jamia Uloom-ul-Islamia
- Occupation: Hadith Teacher
- Relatives: Muhibbullah Babunagari (maternal uncle); Harun Babunagari (maternal grandfather); Sufi Azizur Rahman (maternal great-grandfather)

Religious life
- Religion: islam
- Denomination: Sunni
- Jurisprudence: Hanafi
- Movement: Deobandi

Senior posting
- Teacher: Sultan Zauq Nadvi; Shah Ahmad Shafi; Muhammad Yousuf Banuri; Wali Hasan Tonki
- Influenced: Mamunul Haque

Muḥammad Junaid, popularly known as Junaid Babunagari (Bengali: জুনায়েদ বাবুনগরী; 8 October 1953 – 19 August 2021), was a Bangladeshi Deobandi Islamic scholar, educator, writer, researcher, Islamic speaker and spiritual figure. He was the Amir of Hefazat-e-Islam Bangladesh, Shaykhul Hadith of Darul Uloom Hathazari Madrasa, vice-president of Befaqul Madarisil Arabia Bangladesh, Chairman of Chittagong Noorani Talimul Quran Board and Editor-in-Chief of Monthly Mueenul Islam.

== Early life and family ==
Muhammad Junaid was born on 8 October 1953, in the village of Babunagar in Fatikchhari Thana, Chittagong District, East Bengal, Pakistan (now Bangladesh). He belonged to a Bengali Muslim family of theologians and Qadis hailing from the village of Dhurung. His father, Muhammad Abul Hasan, was a scholar of Quranic exegesis and senior professor at Al-Jamiatul Ahlia Darul Ulum Moinul Islam in Hathazari. Junaid's lineage is as follows: Muḥammad Junaid ibn Muḥammad Abū al-Ḥasan ibn Nadhīr Aḥmad ibn Shākir ʿAlī ibn Ghulām Nabī ibn Kahūlan ibn Muʿīn ad-Dīn al-Qāḍī ibn ʿAyn ad-Dīn al-Qāḍī. His mother, Fatimah Khatun, was the daughter of Harun Babunagari, founder of Al-Jamiatul Islamiah Azizul Uloom Babunagar. His mother's paternal grandfather, Sufi Azizur Rahman, was one of the founders of the Hathazari madrasa and a descendant of Caliph Abu Bakr.

Junaid had three brothers and two sisters. Two of his younger brothers are Shuaib Babunagari, Ustadh of Babunagar Madrasa, and Zubair Babunagari, Muhaddith of Sultanpur Madrasa in Raozan. His sister, Rashidah, is married to Bengali author Abu Jafar Shahadat, former imam of Jamiatul Falah Mosque. His other sister, Mahmuda Khatun, is married to Mawlana Zakariyyah, principal of a madrasa in Madarsha.

== Education ==
At the age of five, he entered Al-Jamiatul Islamiah Azizul Uloom Babunagar where he completed his hifz and basic Islamic and primary studies. After reading the entire Quran off by heart to Azharul Islam Dharmapuri, Babunagari proceeded to study at the Al-Jamiatul Ahlia Darul Ulum Moinul Islam in Hathazari in 1966. In 1976, he completed his master's in Hadith studies at the madrasa where he was also first place in the examinations.

Babunagari was then admitted to the Jamia Uloom-ul-Islamia in Karachi, Pakistan. He studied advanced Hadith studies for four years under Yusuf Banuri. His thesis was titled Sīrah al-Imām ad-Dārimī wa at-Tarīkh bi-Shaykhihī (Biography of Imam Darimi and the history of his teachers) in 1978.

== Career ==
Returning to Bangladesh in 1978, he began teaching at Al-Jamiatul Islamiah Azizul Uloom Babunagar and moved a few year later to Al-Jamiatul Ahlia Darul Ulum Moinul Islam in Hathazari. When Hefazat-e-Islam Bangladesh was formed in 2010, he became its secretary general.

He was briefly imprisoned without any criminal evidence against him in the aftermath of the 2013 Shapla Square protests.

On 15 November 2020, Babunagari was elected the new Amir of Hefajat-e-Islam Bangladesh, replacing the group's founder, Shah Ahmad Shafi, who had died two month earlier.

== Controversy ==
On 11 April 2021, during a press conference, Babunagari claimed that COVID-19 would not spread in madrasas and demanded that these institutions be allowed to remain open during the lockdown. Despite this public stance, Babunagari and several other Hefazat leaders later received their doses of the COVID-19 vaccine. According to a media statement from Hefazat, Babunagari received his vaccine on 8 August 2021, with the intention of easing vaccine concerns among Islamic scholars in the country.

== Works ==
He has written and edited about 30 books in Arabic, Urdu and Bengali, including:

- Shab-e Baraat Between Excess and Rejection (বাড়াবাড়ি ছাড়াছাড়ির কবলে শবে বরাত)
- Ruling on Beard in Islam (ইসলামে দাড়ির বিধান)
- Tawheed and Shirk: Type and Nature (তাওহীদ ও শিরক প্রকার ও প্রকৃতি)
- Muqaddimatul Ilm: Tafseer, Hadith, Fiqh, Fatwa (মুকাদ্দিমাতুল ইলম : তাফসীর হাদীস ফিকাহ ফতোয়া)

The following books are compiled and edited by the direct supervision and guidance of Babunagari:

- Islam vs Contemporary Doctrine (ইসলাম বনাম সমকালীন মতবাদ)
- Common Fake Hadith: A Theoretical Analysis (প্রচলিত জাল হাদীস: একটি তাত্ত্বিক আলোচনা)

Babunagari has written one of the prefaces to Al-Kitab al-Budoor al-Mudiyyah fi Tarajim al-Hanafiyyah by Mawlana Hifzur Rahman al-Kumillai.

== Death and legacy ==
After suffering from various diseases of old age including heart disease, kidney and diabetes for a long time, Junaid Babunagari died of a stroke at the age of 67 on 19 August 2021 at CSCR Hospital in Chittagong, Bangladesh. His funeral, held in Hathazari on the grounds of the madrassa where he used to teach, was attended by tens of thousands of people.

Junaid Babunagari left behind a wife, one son (Muhammad Salman Babunagari) and five daughters.

== See also ==
- List of Deobandis
