= Sajidur Rahman =

Bangladeshi Islamic scholar and educator

Mawlana Sajidur Rahman
- সাজিদুর রহমান
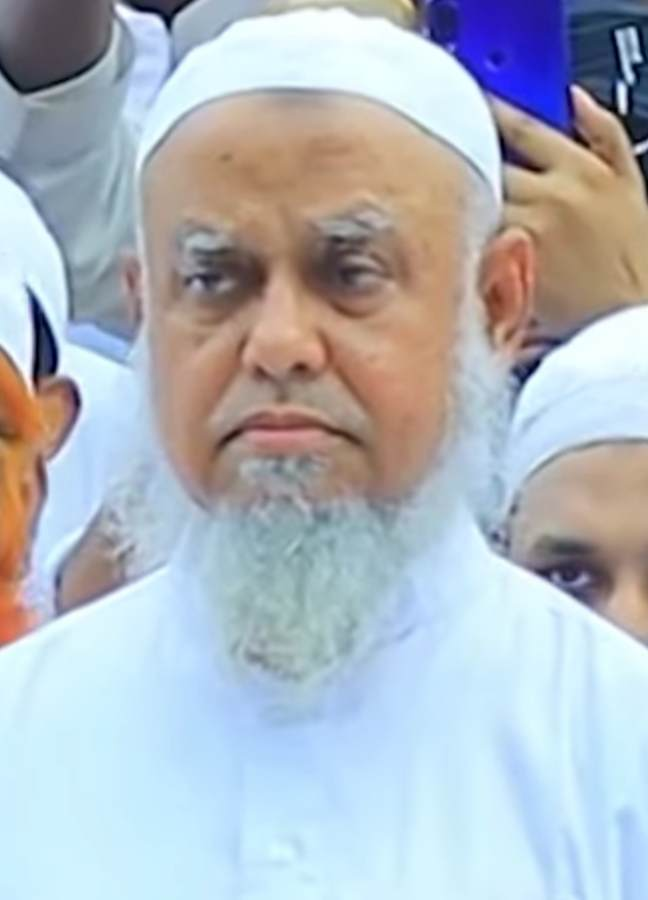
- Rahman in 2024

Secretary General, Hefazat-e-Islam Bangladesh
- Incumbent
- Assumed office 29 November 2021
- Preceded by: Nurul Islam Jihadi

Vice President, Al-Haiatul Ulya Lil-Jamiatil Qawmia Bangladesh
- Incumbent
- Assumed office 2 November 2021
- Preceded by: Muhammad Wakkas

Personal details
- Born: 30 December 1964 (age 61) Bertala, Sarail, Brahmanbaria
- Spouse: Habiba Begum
- Children: 4 sons, 2 daughters
- Education: Al-Jamiatul Ahlia Darul Ulum Moinul Islam; Jamia Islamia Yunusia

Personal life
- Parents: Muhammad Ali (father); Ayesha Begum (mother)
- Era: Modern
- Main interest: Islamic movement
- Notable work: Jamia Darul Arkam Al Islamia

Religious life
- Religion: Islam
- Denomination: Sunni
- Jurisprudence: Hanafi
- Movement: Deobandi

Muslim leader
- Disciple of: Shah Ahmad Shafi

Sajidur Rahman (born 30 December 1964) is a Bangladeshi Islamic scholar and educator. He is the Secretary General of Hefazat-e-Islam Bangladesh and co-chairman of Al-Haiatul Ulya Lil-Jamiatil Qawmia Bangladesh, the highest authority of Qawmi Madrasah. He is also the Senior Vice President of Befaqul Madarisil Arabia Bangladesh, founding principle of Jamia Darul Arkam Al Islamia and Shaykhul Hadith of Jamia Islamia Yunusia.

== Early life ==
Sajidur Rahman was born on 30 December 1964 to Bengali Muslim parents Muhammad Ali and Ayesha Begum in the village of Bertala in Sarail, Brahmanbaria of Comilla District, East Pakistan. He completed his primary education from Natai Government Primary School in Brahmanbaria Sadar Upazila. In 1973, he was admitted to Yazdham Jamaat of Jamia Islamia Yunusia. After 3 years, he was admitted in Islamia Madrasa of Birasar. From this madrasa, he won the first place in the central examination of Edaraye Talimia Brahmanbaria, a regional board of education. Then he was admitted in Al-Jamiatul Ahlia Darul Ulum Moinul Islam. He completed his Dawra-e Hadith (Masters) from this Madrasa in 1984.

== Career ==
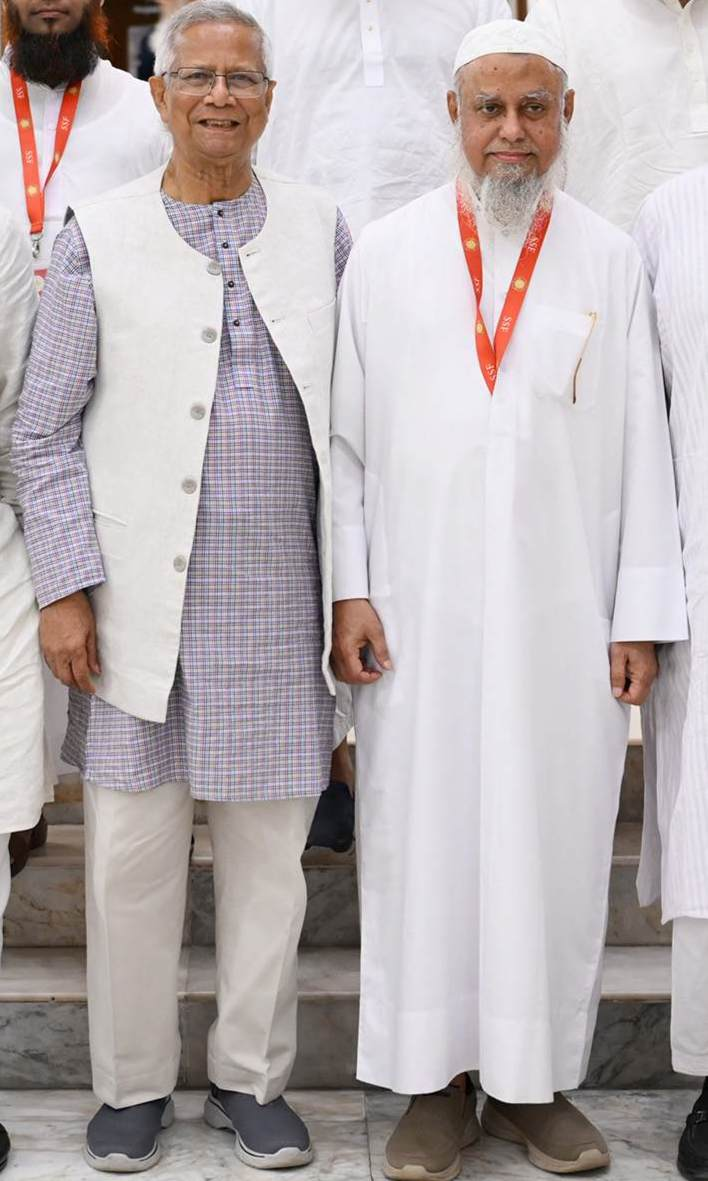
Chief Adviser Muhammad Yunus with Sajidur Rahman at the State Guest House Jamuna

After completing his education, his career started with teaching at Al-Jamia al-Arabia Nasirul Islam Nazirhat. After teaching in this madrasa for 3 years, he joined Al-Jamiatul Ahlia Darul Ulum Moinul Islam. After teaching at Hathazari Madrasa for 3 years, he moved to Qatar. There he served as Khatib for 3 years. After returning country in 1994, he was appointed as Muhaddis of Jamia Islamia Yunusia, Brahmanbaria. In the same year, he founded Jamia Darul Arkam Al Islamia in West Medda, Brahmanbaria. He is currently the principal of this madrasa and serving as shaykhul hadith of Yunusia madrassa. He is the disciple of Shah Ahmad Shafi in Sufism.

On 2 November 2021, he was elected senior vice president of Befaqul Madarisil Arabia Bangladesh and vice president of Al-Haiatul Ulya Lil-Jamiatil Qawmia Bangladesh. On November 29, he was elected acting secretary general of Hefazat-e-Islam Bangladesh.
