= Izharul Islam Chowdhury =

Bangladeshi Islamic scholar

Mufti Izharul Islam
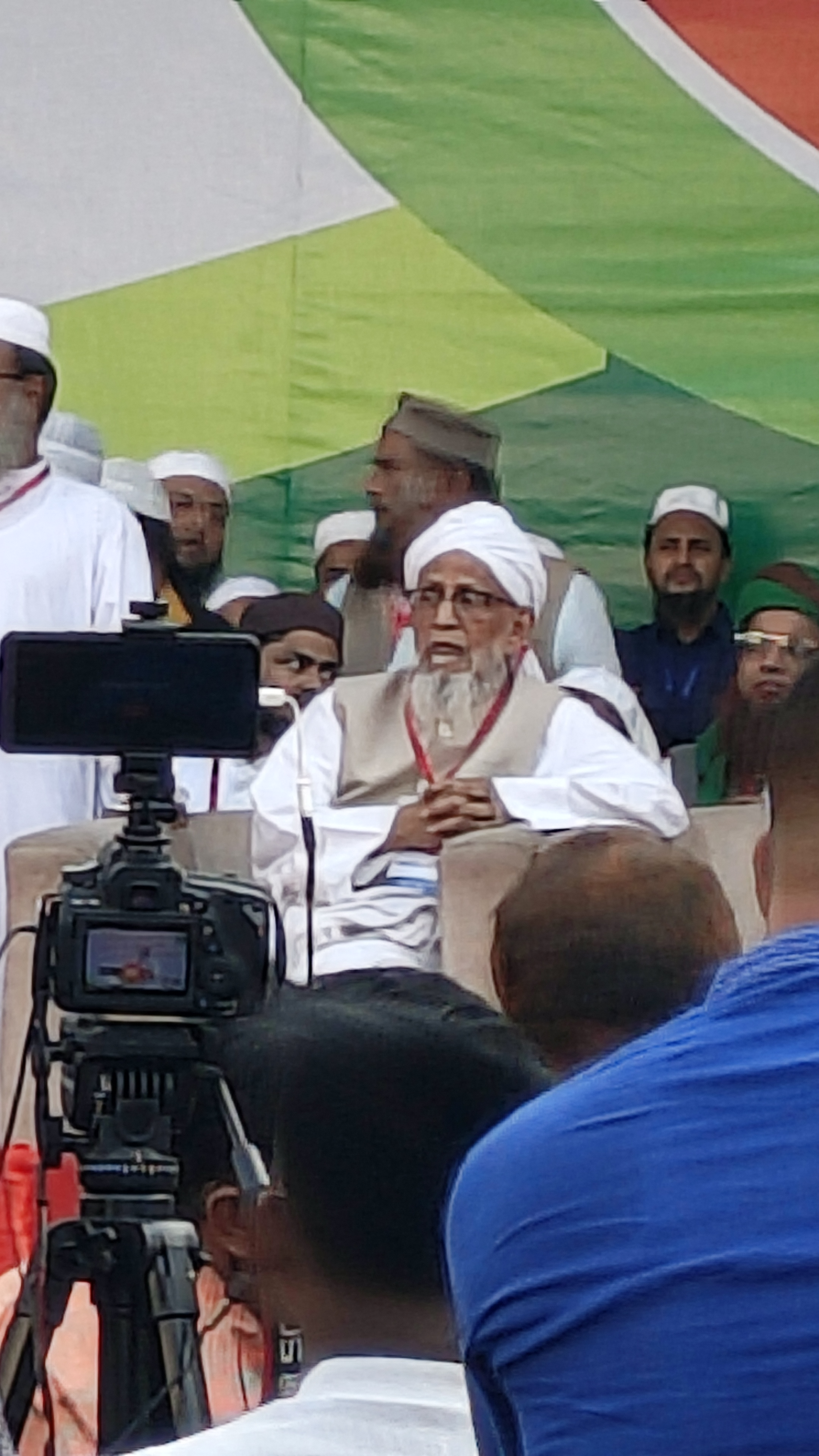

Personal life
- Born: Izharul Islam Chowdhury Chittagong
- Children: Mufti Harun Izhar (son)
- Era: Modern era
- Region: Southeast Asia
- Political party: Nizam-e-Islam, Hefazat-e-Islam
- Main interest: Fiqh
- Notable idea: Jamiatul Uloom Al-Islamia Lalkhan Bazar
- Education: Al-Jamiatul Ahlia Darul Ulum Moinul Islam
- Occupation: Cleric

Religious life
- Religion: Islam
- Jurisprudence: Hanafi
- Movement: Deobandi

Izharul Islam Chowdhury (Bengali: মুফতি ইজহারুল ইসলাম) is the founder of Jamiatul Uloom Al-Islamia Lalkhan Bazar. He is the present executive president of Nizam-e-Islam Party and Nayeb-e-Ameer of Hefazat-e-Islam Bangladesh.

== Early life and education ==
Chowdhury studied at Al-Jamiatul Ahlia Darul Ulum Moinul Islam and Al-Jamiah Al-Islamiah Patiya.

== Career ==
In 1992, Chowdhury was a founding leader of the Harkat-ul Jihad al-Islami Bangladesh, an Islamist terrorist organization. In 2011, he was placed in remand over his links to banned Harkat-ul-Jihad-al-Islami.

Chowdhury serves as the director of his madrasa Jamiatul Uloom Al-Islamia Lalkhan Bazar. A bomb explosion took place at the dorm of the Madrassah, killing three on 7 October 2013. Police recovered bomb-making equipment from the room and crude explosives. Police filed charges against Chowdhury, his son Harun Izhar, and seven others. An arrest warrant was issued against him in March 2014. He was sent to jail in August 2015.

In March 2022, Chowdhury was sentenced to two years imprisonment for submitting a wealth statement to the Anti-Corruption Commission.

Chowdhury is the Nayeb-e-Ameer of Hefazat-e-Islam Bangladesh.

== Works ==
- Hayat-e Mufti-e Azam (Biography of Muhammad Faizullah) in Urdu
- Fathul Maraam sharhe faizul kalam

== See also ==
- List of Deobandis
