= Government Hazi Mohammad Mohsin College, Chittagong =

Educational institution of Bangladesh

Government Hazi Mohammad Mohsin College
- সরকারি হাজী মুহাম্মদ মহসিন কলেজ, চট্টগ্রাম
- Other names: HMMC, GHMMC, MC
- Motto: জ্ঞানই আলো
- Motto in English: Knowledge for enlightenment
- Type: Public
- Established: 1874; 152 years ago
- Founder: Mir Abdur Rashid
- Affiliations: University of Chittagong; Board of Intermediate and Secondary Education, Chattogram; Bangladesh Open University
- Religious affiliation: Islam (1874-1983; presently not considered)
- Chairman: Md. Abu Taher
- Principal: Mohammed Quamrul Islam
- Vice-Principal: Professor Banu Ara Begum
- Faculty: 87
- Students: 20,000
- Location: College Road, Chawkbazar, Chittagong, Bangladesh; 22°21′13″N 91°50′9″E
- Campus: Urban, 31 acres (13 ha)
- Language: Bengali & English
- Colors: Yellow, green, red and purple
- Website: mohsincollege.edu.bd

Government Hazi Mohammad Mohsin College (Bengali: সরকারি হাজী মুহাম্মদ মহসিন কলেজ) is one of the renowned colleges of Bangladesh located in Chittagong, Bangladesh. Named after Muhammad Mohsin, a 19th-century philanthropist, it is one of the oldest educational institutions in the country, originally established in British India in 1874 as the Chittagong Madrasha. It offers Higher Secondary Certificate (HSC) (classes 11–12) in the national curriculum of Bangladesh coupled with bachelor's degree and master's degree in various disciplines in association with National University.

== History ==
Chittagong Madrasha was established in 1874 using a waqf donated by Muhammad Mohsin. In 1918, plans to improve education at the institution were developed and by 1927 it had gradually evolved into Islamic Intermediate College. Forty years later, a government-run higher secondary college was founded at the foot of the hill on which Islamic Intermediate College stood. On 20 July 1979, Hazi Muhammad Mohsin College came into existence when the two institutions merged. In 1996, the attached high school was relocated as Mohsin School.

== Campus ==
The college has eight buildings which cover almost 31 acres (130,000 m^{2}) of land. Two hostels situated to the west of the Administrative Building offer housing for one hundred students. Another hostel and the dean's residence are situated south of the Commerce Department Building. On top of a hill stands the college mosque.

One of the buildings is almost a century old. It is called Darul Adalat, and it was the first court of Chittagong under British colonial rule; the site may also have been fortified by Portuguese pirates in the 16th century. The locals refer to it the Portuguese Building due to its architectural style. Mohsin College (then Chittagong Madrasa) bought the hill, along with the building, for 30,000 Taka in 1879, and it remained central to the institution for many years, though by 2013, it had fallen into disrepair and was in danger of being demolished to make way for a library. The Mohsin School was previously located in this campus.

=== Faculties and department ===
The college teaches honours and offers master's degrees in 14 subjects. It has the faculties :

- Faculty of Arts & Social Science
- Faculty of Science
- Faculty of Commerce

=== Faculty of Arts & Social Science ===
The faculty comprises the following departments:

- Department of Bengali
- Department of English
- Department of Economics
- Department of Political Science
- Department of Islamic History and Culture
- Department of Philosophy
- Department of Sociology
- Department of Arabic & Islamic Studies

=== Faculty of Science ===
The faculty comprises the following departments:

- Department of Physics
- Department of Chemistry
- Department of Botany
- Department of Zoology
- Department of Mathematics

=== Faculty of Commerce ===
The faculty comprises the following departments:

- Department of Accounting
- Department of Management

== College facility ==
=== Student dormitories ===
There are two male and one female student dormitories.

=== College ground ===
The college has a large ground known. n this ground students from the college and from other colleges play cricket, football, and volleyball.

=== Co-curricular activities ===
- BNCC, HQ of Karnaphuly Battalion-2 of Bangladesh National Cadet Corps. Two Sections are Army Wing and Naval Wing
- Rover Scout
- Mohsin College Debating Club-MCDC
- Cultural Podium Of Mohsin College-CPMC
- Bangladesh Red Crescent Society of Mohsin College

=== Administrative and academic buildings ===
- College mosque

== Notable alumni ==
- Abdul Wahid Bengali, co-founder of Al-Jamiatul Ahlia Darul Ulum Moinul Islam
- Abdul Hamid Madarshahi, co-founder of Al-Jamiatul Ahlia Darul Ulum Moinul Islam
- Sufi Azizur Rahman, co-founder of Al-Jamiatul Ahlia Darul Ulum Moinul Islam
- Shantanu Biswas, dramatist, playwright, singer-songwriter
- Hasan Mahmud, Bangladeshi Minister and Parliamentarian
- Yasir Ali Chowdhury, cricketer
- M. Abdul Latif, MP
- Abdul Karim, 5th Vice-Chancellor of the University of Chittagong
- Abul Fazal 4th Vice-Chancellor of the University of Chittagong
- Ohidul Alam, Bangladeshi writer, poet, historian, and journalist

== See also ==
- Bangladesh Open University
- Board of Intermediate and Secondary Education, Chattogram
- Education in Bangladesh
- List of colleges in Chittagong
- National University, Bangladesh
- Hazi Mohammad Mohsin Government High School
