= Shah Ahmad Shafi =

Bangladeshi Sunni Islamic scholar (1930–2020)

Shaykh al-Islām Shah Ahmad Shafi
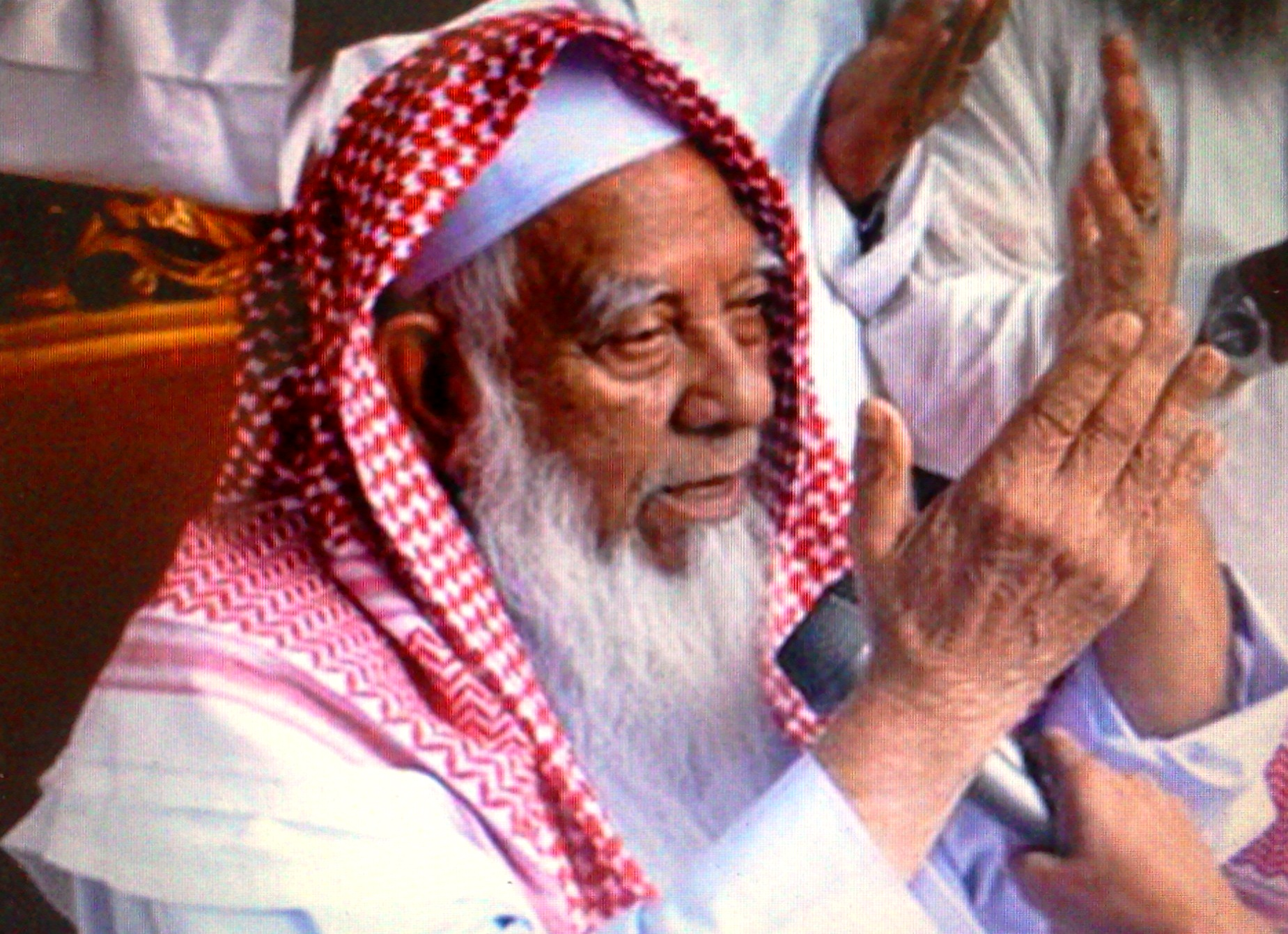
- Shafi in 2014

Amir of Hefazat-e-Islam Bangladesh
- In office January 2010 – 18 September 2020
- Preceded by: position established
- Succeeded by: Junaid Babunagari
- Title: Sheikhul Islam

Personal life
- Born: 5 April 1930 Rangunia, Bengal, British India
- Died: 18 September 2020 (aged 90) Dhaka, Bangladesh
- Resting place: Madrasa cemetery
- Children: Anas Madani
- Citizenship: British Indian (1930-1947); Pakistani (1947-1971); Bangladeshi (1971-2020)
- Era: Modern era
- Region: Chittagong
- Main interest: Hadith
- Notable idea: Fiqh jurisprudence
- Notable work: Hefazat-e-Islam Bangladesh
- Education: Darul Uloom Deoband, Al-Jameatul Arabiatul Islamia Ziri
- Occupation: Hadith, Scholar

Religious life
- Religion: Islam
- Denomination: Sunni
- Jurisprudence: Hanafi
- Tariqa: Qadri; Chishti; Soharwardi; Naqshbandi
- Creed: Maturidi
- Movement: Deobandi

Muslim leader
- Disciple of: Hussain Ahmad Madani
- Disciples: Nurul Islam Olipuri, Sajidur Rahman, A F M Khalid Hossain, Jamir Uddin Nanupuri, Yahya Alampuri, Abdul Quddus
- Influenced by: Ashraf Ali Thanwi Hussain Ahmad Madani Rashid Ahmad Gangohi
- Influenced: Sultan Zauq Nadvi Nurul Islam Jihadi Junaid Babunagari Syed Faizul Karim A F M Khalid Hossain Mamunul Haque Zia Uddin

Shah Ahmad Shafi (Bengali: শাহ আহমদ শফী; 5 April 1930 – 18 September 2020) was a Bangladeshi Sunni Islamic scholar, the chief of Hefazat-e-Islam Bangladesh, Rector of Al-Jamiatul Ahlia Darul Ulum Moinul Islam Hathazari and also the chairman of Bangladesh Qawmi Madrasah Education Board. He was born in 1930 in Rangunia, Chittagong and was educated at Hathazari Madrasah and Darul Uloom Deoband.

== Early life ==
He was born on 5 April 1930 in Rangunia, Chittagong. He received his primary education from his family. Then he joined Al-Jamiatul Arabiatul Islamiah Ziri. He was admitted to Al-Jamiatul Ahlia Darul Ulum Moinul Islam in 1941 (1344-45 AH) at the age of 10. In Hathazari Madrasah he studied for 10 years. Then Shafi went to Darul Uloom Deoband for higher studies in the field of Hadith and Tafsir.

He was a renowned Islamic scholar in Bangladesh. He studied there for four years before returning to his homeland Bangladesh. During his study time at Darul Uloom Deoband he became close to Hussain Ahmad Madani and later he became his youngest official successor from Indian subcontinent. Ahmad Shafi was the leader of Hifazat-E-Islam Bangladesh, (a non-political Islamic organization).

== Career ==
Ahmad Shafi commenced his career as a teacher at Al-Jamiatul Ahlia Darul Ulum Moinul Islam Hathazari, Chittagong (Hathazari Madrasah). In 1986/1987 (1407 AH), he was elected rector (Head of the University Madrasah) of Hathazari Madrasah. Shafi was also the chairman of Bangladesh Qawmi Madrasah Education Board.

Shah Ahmad Shafi was to continue to serve as the director general of Al-Jamiatul Ahlia Darul Ulum Moinul Islam, also known as Hathazari Madrasa, as decided by Majlis-e-Shura. "No one will be appointed as the acting rector of the madrasa as long as Shafi is alive," Press Secretary of the Hefazat chief, Munir Ahmed said.

== Views ==
In 2009 (1430 AH), Ahmad Shafi, Azizul Haque, and other Bengali Muslim scholars, in a joint statement to the Prime Minister Sheikh Hasina Wazed, condemned terrorism and militancy committed in the name of Islam.

== Controversy ==
=== 2013 comments ===
In 2013, a speech given by Ahmad Shafi at Hathazari, Chittagong was described as highly misogynistic. He reportedly said: "Why are you sending your daughters to work in garment factories?... She goes to work after Fajr at 7/8:00am and does not come back even at 8/10/12 at night... You do not know which man she is hanging out with. You do not know how much zina (fornication) she is getting involved in."

The comments caused outrage among women's rights activists who demanded his imprisonment. Sheikh Hasina, the Prime Minister of Bangladesh termed the statement "disgusting" and "distasteful".

=== Alleged relationship with Bangladesh Jamaat-e-Islami ===
Although the Awami League described him as a frontman for Bangladesh Jamaat-e-Islami, analysts say this is highly unlikely as Ahmad Shafi belonged to a band of Islamists that unlike Jamaat, did not oppose the independence of Bangladesh, and supported a united India and rejected the creation of Pakistan in 1947.

== Death ==
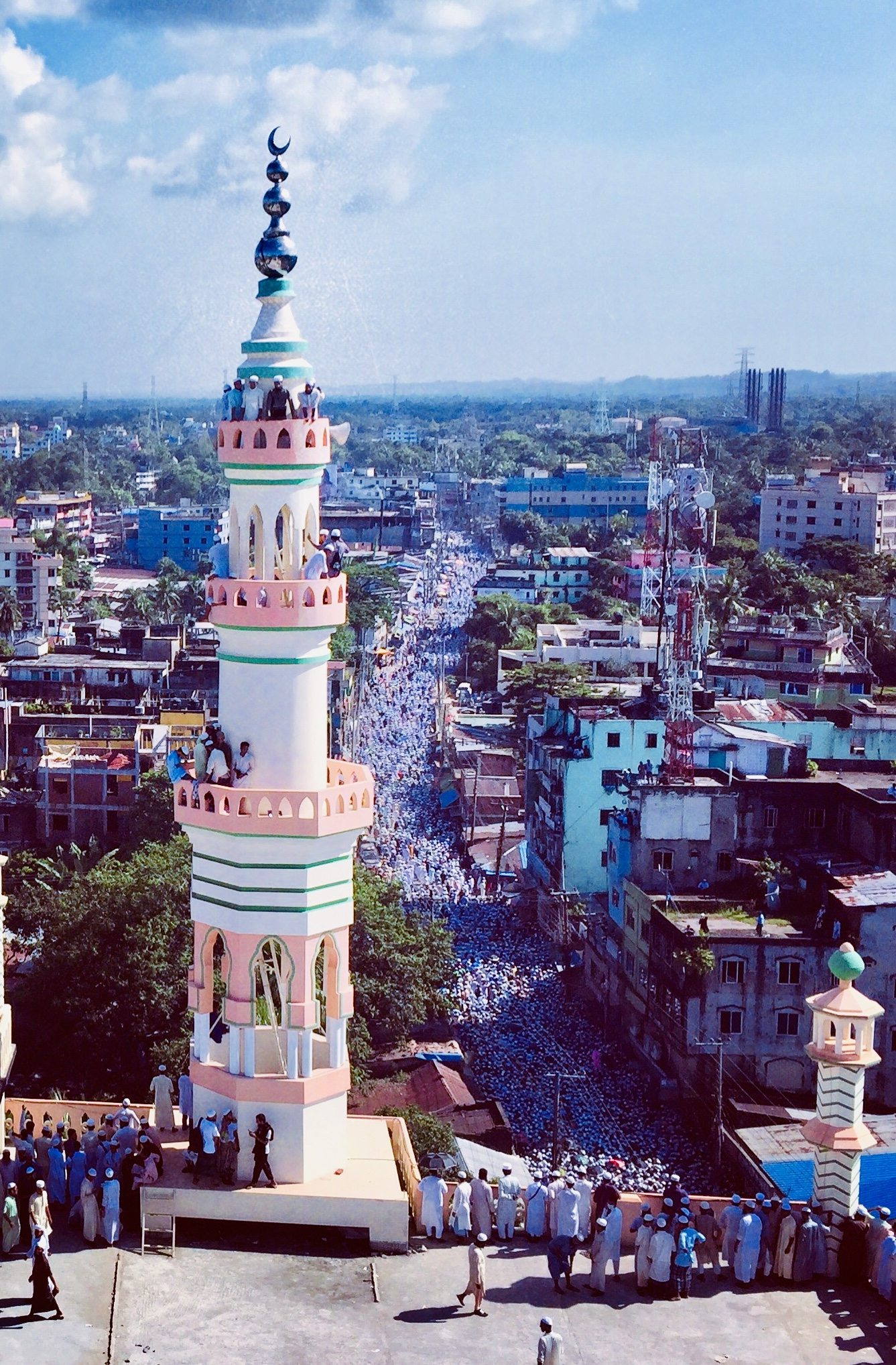
Drone shot of Ahmad Shafi's congregatory funeral prayer in Chittagong.

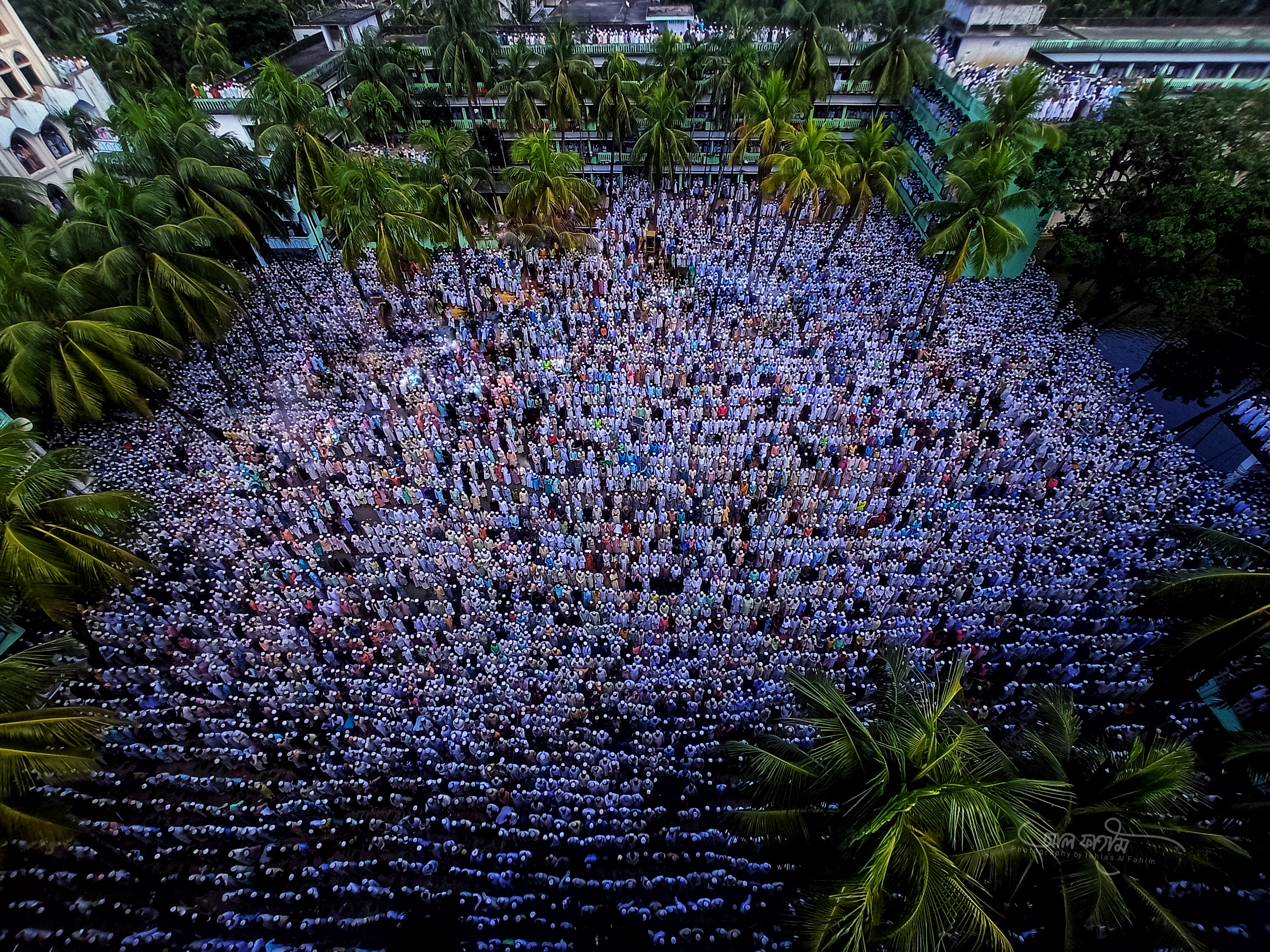
Salat al-Janazah of Shah Ahmad Shafi

He was suffering from various complex diseases of old age including Diabetes and heart disease for years. On 17 September 2020 midnight, Shafi was brought by ambulance from Hathazari Madrasah to Chittagong Medical College Hospital (CMCH) as his physical condition deteriorated. He was later admitted to the 6th bed of the Intensive Care Unit (ICU) on the 3rd floor of the hospital as his blood pressure and pulse rate decreased.

A medical board was formed on the morning of 18 September 2020, who suggested he should be moved to Dhaka for better treatment. On the advice of doctors, the family members took him to Asgar Ali Hospital in Dhaka by air ambulance at 4.30 pm for better treatment. Hefazat-e-Islam Bangladesh leader Mufti Mohammad Faizullah confirmed that he died at 6pm on Friday.

== Works ==
=== Urdu ===
- Faizu-l-Jaari (Explanation of Bukhari)
- Al-Bayaanu-l-Fasil Baina-l-Haqqi wa-l-Baatil
- Al-Hujaju-l-Qaatiah Li-daf-yin Nahjil Khatiah
- Al-Khairu-l-Katheer Fee Usuli-t-Tafseer
- Islam o Siyaasat
- Izhar-e-Haqeeqat
- Takfeer-e-Muslim
- Chand Raoyejna
- Fuyoozat-e-Ahmadiyah

=== Bengali ===
- Haq O Batiler Chiranton Dondo
- Islami Ortho Bebostha
- Islam O Rajniti
- Sotter Dikhe Korun Ahoban
- Sunnat O Bid'ater Sothik Porichoy
- Mukhosh Ummochon
- Qur'aan o Sunnat er Alokay Apnar Namaaj

== See also ==
- List of Deobandis
