= Jamiatul Uloom Al-Islamia Lalkhan Bazar =

Madrasa in Chittagong District, Bangladesh

- Lalkhan Bazar Madrasa
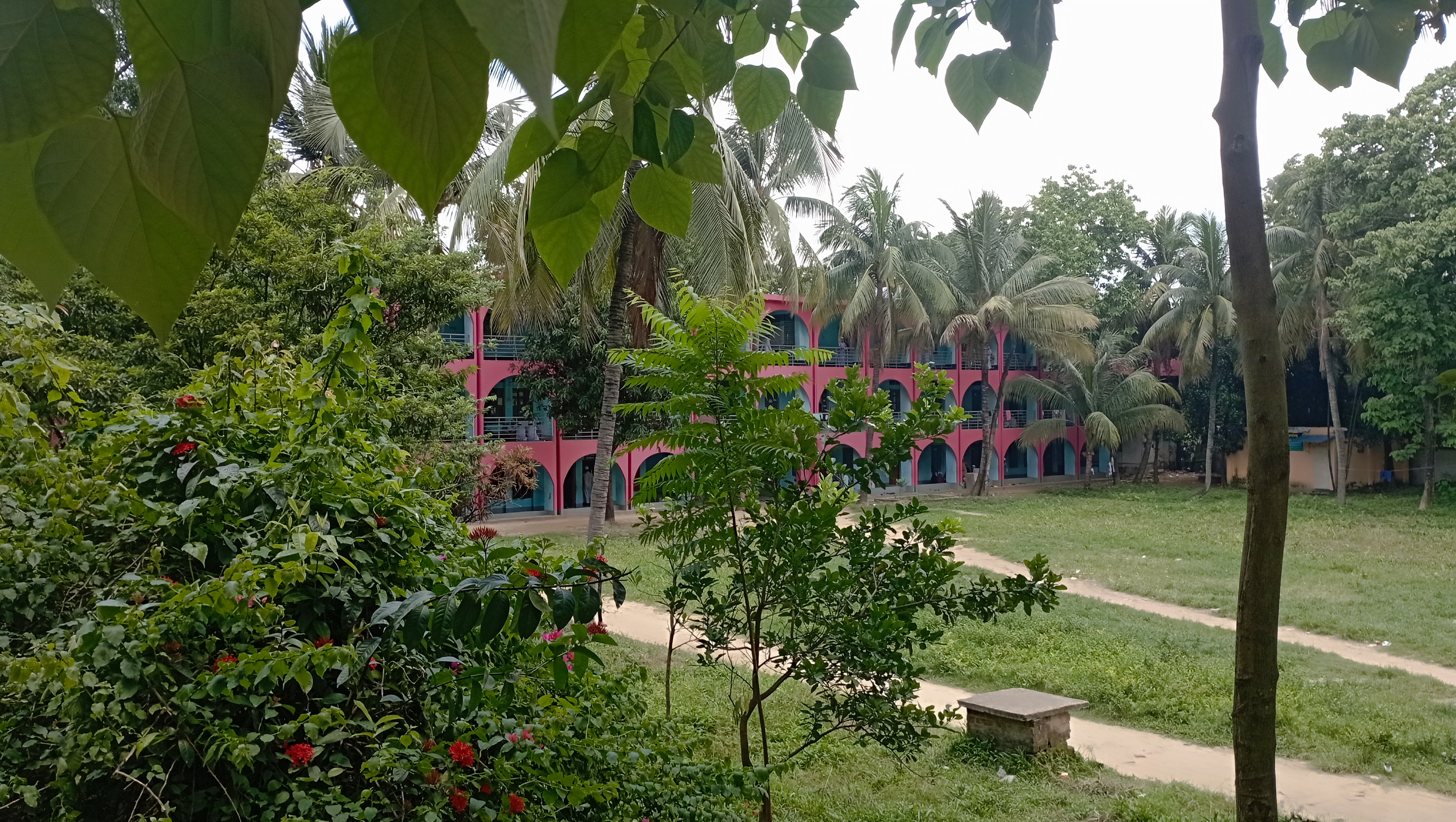
- Type: Islamic university
- Established: 1981
- Principal: Mufti Izharul Islam
- Academic staff: 56
- Students: around 1,500
- Location: Lalkhan Bazar, Chittagong; 22.3549°N 91.8158°E
- Campus: Urban

Jamiatul Uloom Al-Islamia Lalkhan Bazar (Arabic: الجامعة العلوم الإسلامية لالخان بازار), popularly known as Lalkhan Bazar Madrasa (Bengali: লালখান বাজার মাদ্রাসা), is a Qawmi madrasah situated in the Lalkhan Bazar area of port city Chittagong.

== History ==
The jamia is founded by Mufti Izharul Islam, founding leader of the Harkat-ul Jihad al-Islami Bangladesh. His elder son Mufti Harun Izhar is the assistant director of the jamia. A bomb explosion took place at the dorm of the Madrassah killing three on 7 October 2013. Police recovered bomb-making equipment from the room and crude explosives. Police filed charges Mufti Izharul Islam, Mufti Harun Izhar, and seven others.

== Education system ==
The Lalkhan Bazar Madrasah offers the students Islamic education from the very initial stage up to the highest level. It also offers Specialization (equivalent to a PhD) to the students who have successfully completed Takmil (MA).

=== Departments ===
- Department of Hifzul Qur'an
- Department of Fatwaa (Dar al-Ifta)
- Madrasa-tul-Banat (Female Section)

== Network of madrasahs ==
Lalkhan Bazar Madrasah is one of the three large madrasahs — along with Darul Uloom Muinul Islam in Hathazari and Al-Jamiah Al-Islamiah in Patiya — that together control over 7,000 smaller schools in Bangladesh. The three schools are closely coordinated.
