= Muhammad Faizullah =

Bangladeshi Islamic scholar (1890–1976)

Grand Mufti Mufti Faizullah
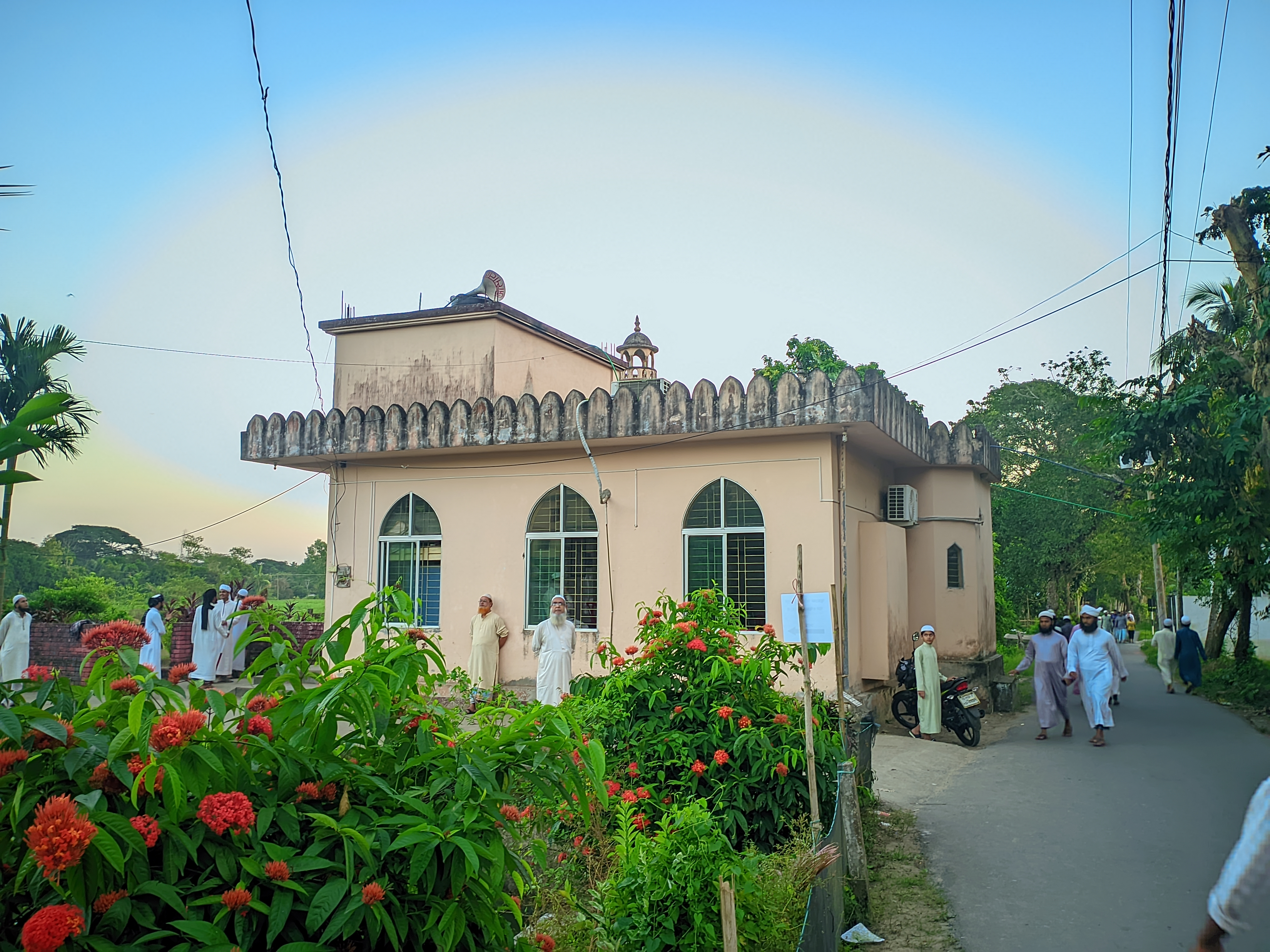
- Visitors at the Gravesite of Muhammad Faizullah Near the Mosque

Personal details
- Born: 1890 Hathazari, Chittagong, British Raj
- Died: 1976 (aged 85–86)
- Education: Al-Jamiatul Ahlia Darul Ulum Moinul Islam; Darul Uloom Deoband
- Main interests: Hadith; Fiqh
- Notable work: Jamia Islamia Hamius-Sunnah

Religious life
- Religion: Islam
- Denomination: Sunni
- Jurisprudence: Hanafi
- Movement: Deobandi

Senior posting
- Teacher: Abdul Hamid Madarshahi; Anwar Shah Kashmiri; Azizur Rahman Usmani
- Disciple of: Saeed Ahmad Sandwipi
- Disciples: Harun Babunagari, Azizul Haq, Shah Ahmad Shafi, Izharul Islam
- Students: Ashraf Ali Bishwanathi Sultan Ahmad Nanupuri Shah Ahmad Shafi, Jamir Uddin Nanupuri, Yahya Alampuri, Abdul Quddus

Mufti Faizullah (Bengali: মুফতি ফয়জুল্লাহ), was a Bangladeshi Deobandi Islamic scholar, mufti, poet, educator and a reformer. He was among early students to study at the Darul Uloom Hathazari. He was an alumnus of Darul Uloom Deoband and later served as the Chief Mufti of the Darul Uloom Hathazari. He established Mekhal Madrasa following in the style of Ashab-e Suffah. He authored over 100 books in Arabic, Persian and Urdu.

== Early life and education ==
Faizullah was born in 1890 to a Bengali Muslim family in the village of Mekhal in Hathazari, Chittagong district. His father, Hedayet Ali, was a munshi, while his mother, Rahimunnesa, was a housewife. He received his initial education at Darul Uloom Hathazari and was among its early students, studying under the likes of Abdul Hamid Madarshahi. In 1330 AH (1912 CE), he set off for Darul Uloom Deoband in Saharanpur, where he received higher education for two and a half years under Mahmud Hasan Deobandi, Anwar Shah Kashmiri and Aziz-ul-Rahman Usmani. He specialised in Hadith studies.

== Career ==
He was appointed a teacher at the Darul Uloom Hathazari in 1915, and subsequently became its Chief Mufti. He established Hami as-Sunnah Mekhal Madrasa following in the style of Ashab-e-Suffah in 1934. He was involved in the management of this madrasa until his death in 1976. He was awarded the title of "Mufti Azam" for his experience in issuing fatwas.

== Literary works ==
Faizullah authored about 100 books in Arabic, Persian and Urdu. He majorly focused on Aqidah and Fiqh in his writings. He extensively wrote on controversial matters for educational purposes of the Muslim community. Under the instruction of Abdul Hamid Madarshahi, Faizullah compiled the explanation of Ka'b ibn Zuhayr's Bānat Suʿād qasida into Persian. His books include:

=== Arabic ===
- فيض الكلام (Fayḍ al-Kalām)
- هداية العباد (Hidāyah al-ʿIbād)
- رافع الإشكالات (Rāfiʿ al-Ishkālāt)
- تعليم المبتدئ (Taʿlīm al-Mubtadi)
- إظهار المنكرات (Iẓhār al-Munkarāt)
- توجيه البيان (Tawjīh al-Bayān)
- إزالة الخبط (Izālah al-Khabaṭ)
- ترغيب الأمة إلى تحسين النية (Targhīb al-Ummah ilā Taḥsīn an-Niyyah)
- إظهار الاختلال في مسئلة الهلال (Iẓhār al-Ikhtilāl fī Mas'alah al-Hilāl)
- القول السديد في حكم الأهوال والمواعيظ (Al-Qawl al-Sadīd fī Ḥukm al-Ahwāl wa al-Mawāʿīẓ)
- الفلاح فيما يتعلق بالنكاح (Al-Falāḥ fīmā yataʿallaq bin-Nikāḥ)

=== Persian ===
- بند نامه خاکی (Band Nāmah-e-Khākī)
- مثنوي خاکی (Masnavī-e-Khākī)
- إرشاد الأمة (Ershād al-Ummah)
- منظومات مختصرة (Manẓūmāt-e-Mukhtasarah)
- قند خاکی (Qand-e-Khākī)
- مثنوي دلپذیر (Masnavī-e-Dilpazīr)
- الفيصلة الجارية في أوقاف المدارس (Al-Faysalah Al-Jāriyah fī Awqāf al-Madāris)
- حفظ الإيمان (Ḥifẓ al-Īmān)
- منكرات القبور (Munkarāt al-Qubūr)
- دفع الوساوس في أوقاف المدارس (Dafʿ al-Wasāwis fī Awqāf al-Madāris)
- الحق الصريح في مسلك الصحيح (Al-Ḥaq as-Ṣarīh fī Maslak as-Ṣaḥīḥ)
- دفع الإعتساف في أحكام الاعتكاف (Dafʿ al-Iʿtisāf fī Aḥkām al-Iʿtikāf)
- إظهار خيال (Iẓhār-e-Khayāl)
- شومي معاصي (Shūmī Maʿāṣī)
- الرسالة المنظومة على فطرة النيجرية (Al-Risālah al-Manẓūmah ʿalā Fiṭrah an-Nījariyyah)

=== Urdu ===
- شرح بوستان (Sharh-e-Būstān)
- شرح گلستان (Sharh-e-Gulistān)
- حاشية عطار (Hāshiyat-e-ʿAṭṭār)

== Death ==
Faizullah died in 1396 AH (1976 CE) and was buried in front of his home in Mekhal.

== See also ==
- List of Deobandis
