= Befaqul Madarisil Arabia Bangladesh =

Bangladeshi Qawmi Madrasa Education Board

Coordinates: 23.7114°N 90.4462°E

- Befaqul Madarisil Arabia Bangladesh
- Formation: April 1978; 48 years ago
- Type: Nongovernmental Education Board, [Islamic Seminaries]
- Legal status: Board
- Purpose: Educational
- Location: Kajla, Jatrabari, Dhaka-1236
- Region served: Bangladesh
- Official language: Bengali, Arabic
- Chairman: Mahmudul Hasan
- Senior Vice Chairman: Sajidur Rahman
- Secretary General: Mahfuzul Haque
- Director General (DG): Ubaidur Rahman Khan Nadvi
- Key people: Muhius Sunnah Allama Mahmudul hassan
- Main organ: Majlis-e-Shura, Majlis-e-Amela
- Affiliations: Deobandi
- Website: www.wifaqbd.org

Befaqul Madarisil Arabia Bangladesh (Bengali: বেফাকুল মাদারিসিল আরাবিয়া বাংলাদেশ, Arabic: وفاق المدارس العربية بنغلاديش) is the largest Qawmi madrasa education board in Bangladesh. it was founded in April 1978 after a seminar of Islamic scholars. This organization of Qawmi Madrasas of Bangladesh is also known as the "Befaqul Madaris" (also transliterated as Befaqul ul Madaris). It is an extension of the process that formed the Wafaq ul Madaris Al-Arabia, Pakistan in 1957. "Bangladesh Qawmi Madrasah Education Board" is the largest federation of Islamic seminaries in Bangladesh. Qawmi educational system practices originate from the traditional Muslim educational system of Bangladesh. At present, there are more than 65,000 Qawmi Madrasahs in Bangladesh. As of 2013, more than 20,000 Seminaries across Bangladesh are affiliated with "Befaqul Madaris". It controls all the seminaries which are run by Deobandi School of thought. Deobandi School of thought is supposed to be the most powerful and dominated school of thought in Bangladesh.

== Objectives and functions ==
The board was founded to assure a standardized curriculum and to provide centralized examination. Membership with the board is voluntary, though required for degree accreditation by the Befaqul Madaris.

The main functions of the federation are: registration of Madrasas, creation of syllabus, checking standard of education, arrangement of examination and issuance of degrees.

== Notable institutions ==
The following are some of the notable Qawmi Madrasahs in Bangladesh:

- Al-Jameatul Arabiatul Islamia Ziri
- Al-Jamiatul Ahlia Darul Ulum Moinul Islam
- Befaqul Madarisil Qawmia Gawhardanga Bangladesh
- Al-Jamiatul Arabia Haildhar Madrasa
- Jamia Tawakkulia Renga Madrasah
- Jamiatul Uloom Al-Islamia Lalkhan Bazar - also known as Lalkhan Bazar Madrasah
- Jamia Qurania Arabia Lalbagh
- Al-Jamiah Al-Islamiah Patiya
- Jamia Shariyyah Malibagh, Dhaka
- Jamia Rahmania Arabia Dhaka
- Jamia Darul Ma'arif Al-Islamia

== See also ==
- List of Deobandi organisations
- Qawmi madrasa
- Religious education
