= Darul Uloom Hathazari =

Madrasa in Chittagong District, Bangladesh

Coordinates: 22.504552°N 91.807611°E

Al-Jamiatul Ahlia Darul Ulum Muinul Islam
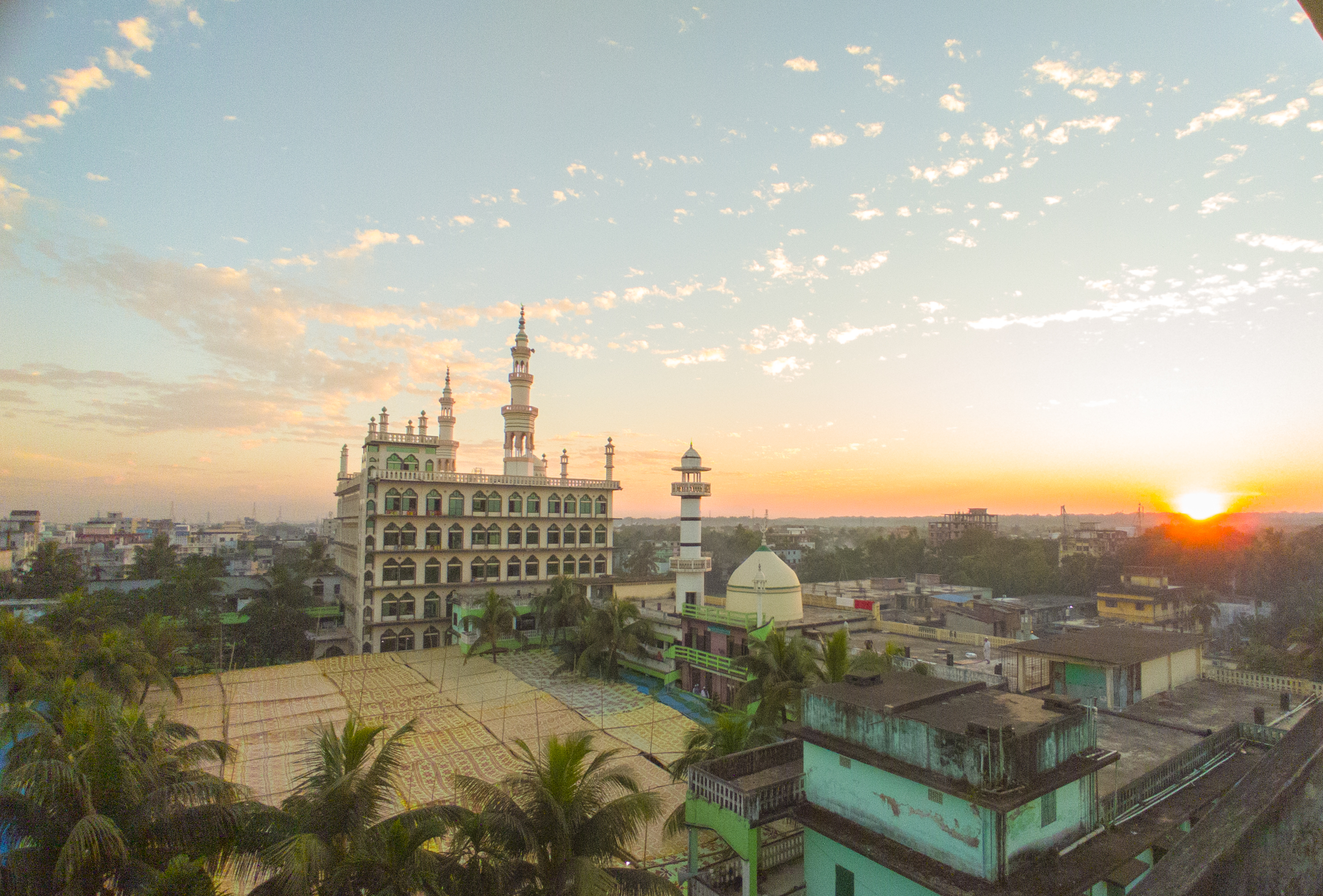
- Hathazari Madrasah Mosque outer sight
- Type: Islamic university
- Established: 1901; 125 years ago (1310 Hijri)
- Founder: Sheikh ul Islam Allama Habibullah Quraishi (RH.)
- Chancellor: Majlis-e-Shura
- Faculty: 110+ (2024)
- Students: 8000+ (2024)
- Postgraduates: 2601 (2024)
- Location: Hathazari, Chittagong, Bangladesh
- Campus: Urban (4.43 acres)
- Website: darululoomhathazari.com

Al-Jāmiʿah al-Ahliyyah Dār al-ʿUlūm Muʿīn al-Islām (Arabic: الجامعة الأهلية دار العلوم معين الإسلام), popularly known as the Hāṭhazārī Madrasah (Bengali: হাটহাজারী মাদ্রাসা) or the Great Madrasah (Bengali: বড় মাদ্রাসা, romanized: Boṛo Madraśa), is a Qawmi institution of Hathazari, located in Bangladesh's Chittagong District. Established in 1901, it is the largest and oldest Deobandi seminary in the country. According to a 2009 National Bureau of Asian Research report, the highly reputed institution ranks among top ten madrasah in the subcontinent.

== History ==
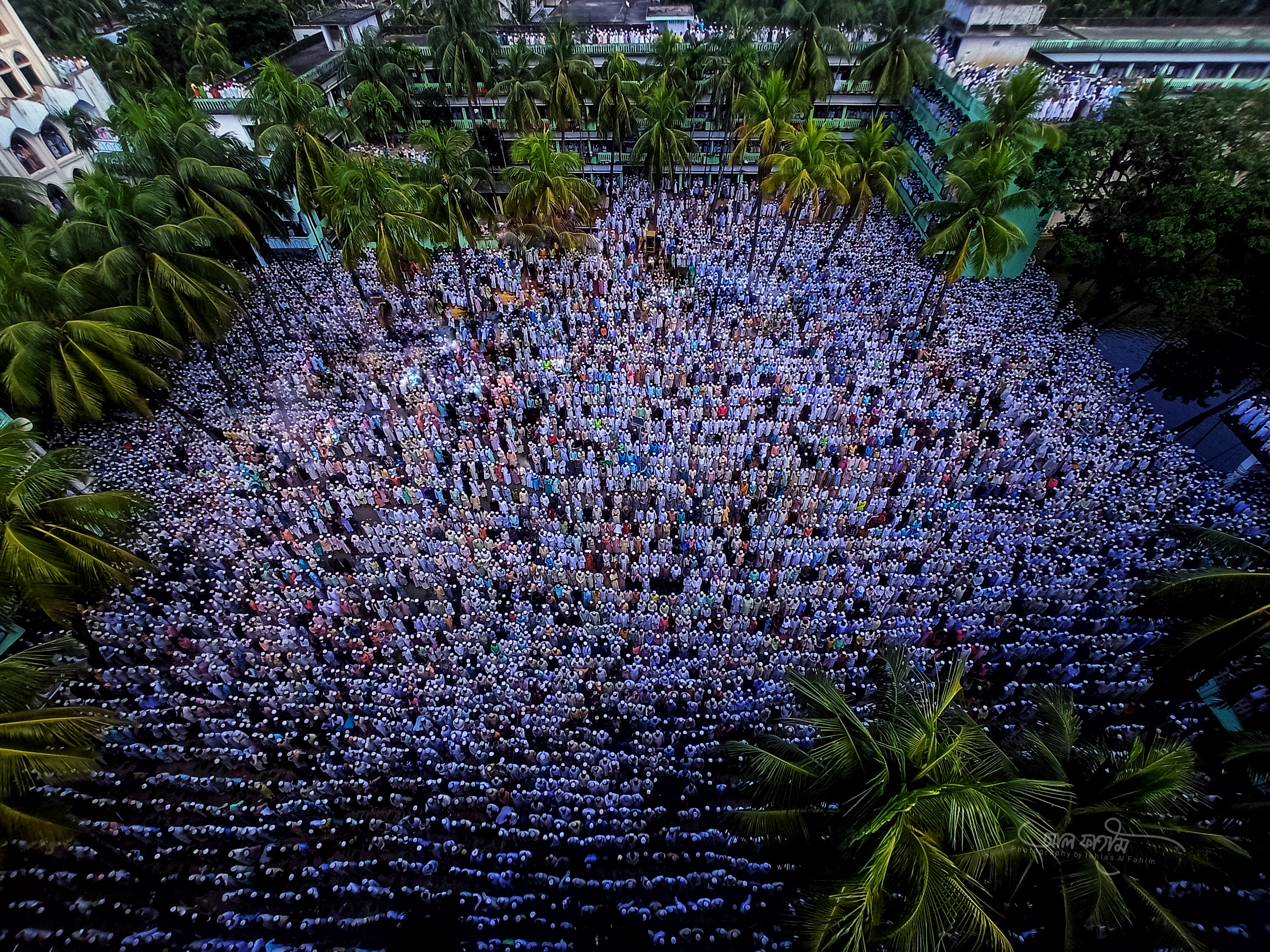
Shah Ahmad Shafi's funeral prayer

Al-Jamiatul Ahlia Darul Ulum Moinul Islam was first established in 1896 CE. It was moved to its present location in Hathazari, Bangladesh in 1901. The Jamiah introduces the Islamic education and Reformation movement in this region.

The Hathazari Madrasah became "arguably the most reputable Quomi madrasa in the country."

Starting in 2004, the Hathazari Madrasa has been at the centre of media attention due to allegations that it is a haven for "terrorist" training. This is the first time in the institution's long history that such allegations have been made against the madrasah itself.

In February 2010, 40 students were arrested for clashing with police and later released. Students had snatched a service rifle.

In 2010, Hefazat-e-Islam Bangladesh emerged from this Madrasa, gaining widespread attention during the 2013 anti-government protests. At that time, Shah Ahmad Shafi served as the organization's Amir, while Junaid Babunagari was the Secretary-General. Babunagari continued to hold his position in the madrasa after Shafi. However, since the 2013 movement, both leaders have undergone changes in their thinking. While Ahmad Shafi gradually distanced himself from the opposition stance against the government, Junaid Babunagari remained unwavering in his position.

On May 5, 2013, a large rally was held by Hefazat-e-Islam Bangladesh at Shapla Chattar in Motijheel, Dhaka. However, during the rally, law enforcement agencies conducted an operation and arrested numerous leaders, including the Secretary-General of the organization, Junayed Babunagari. The Amir of the organization, Shah Ahmed Shafi, was allowed to return to Chittagong. Several cases were filed against Hefazat-e-Islam leaders in connection with this incident. As a result of this event, Hefazat-e-Islam emerged as a political force.

Anas Madani, the son of Ahmad Shafi, played a significant role in his father's change of thinking. Madani's involvement in various controversial activities using the influence of his father has raised concerns. The madrasa officials were divided into two groups, and the conflict between them came to light after Anas Madani's supporters, led by him, held a meeting of the management committee and removed Junaid Babunagari from his position as the assistant director of the madrasa. As a result, on September 16, 2020, students began protesting, demanding the removal of Anas Madani and Ahmad Shafi from the post of Director-General, making Shafi an advisor instead, among other demands.

== Organization and administration ==
The Darul Ulum has divided its education system into six major levels:

- Primary level – Urdu; Persian; Arabic; Nahu-Sarf; Siraat-un-Nabi; Fiqh etc. are taught along with the mathematics; history; Bengali; English and geography.
- Secondary level – higher Arabic grammar; Arabic literature; Fiqh; logic.
- Higher secondary level – higher Fiqh and Usul-e-Fiqh; higher logic; higher Arabic literature; higher economics; higher philosophy; higher Islam history.
- Graduate level – Hadith; Tafsir; Arabic and Persian poetry; solar science.
- Post graduate level – six major Hadith Books: Bukhari Sharif, Muslim Sharif, Abu Dawd Sharif, Tirmidi Sharif, Nasaee Sharif and Ibn Majah are mainly taught.
- Beyond post graduate level – further study in the field of Islamic law; Arabic language and literature; higher Hadith study, Bengali literature and Islamic studies.

=== Network of schools ===
The "Boro Madrassah" is one of the three large madrasahs, along with Al-Jamiah Al-Islamiah in Patiya, and Jamiatul Uloom Al-Islamia Lalkhan Bazar, that together control over 7000 smaller schools in Bangladesh. The three schools are closely coordinated.

== Student protest ==
2020 Darul Uloom Hathazari student protest
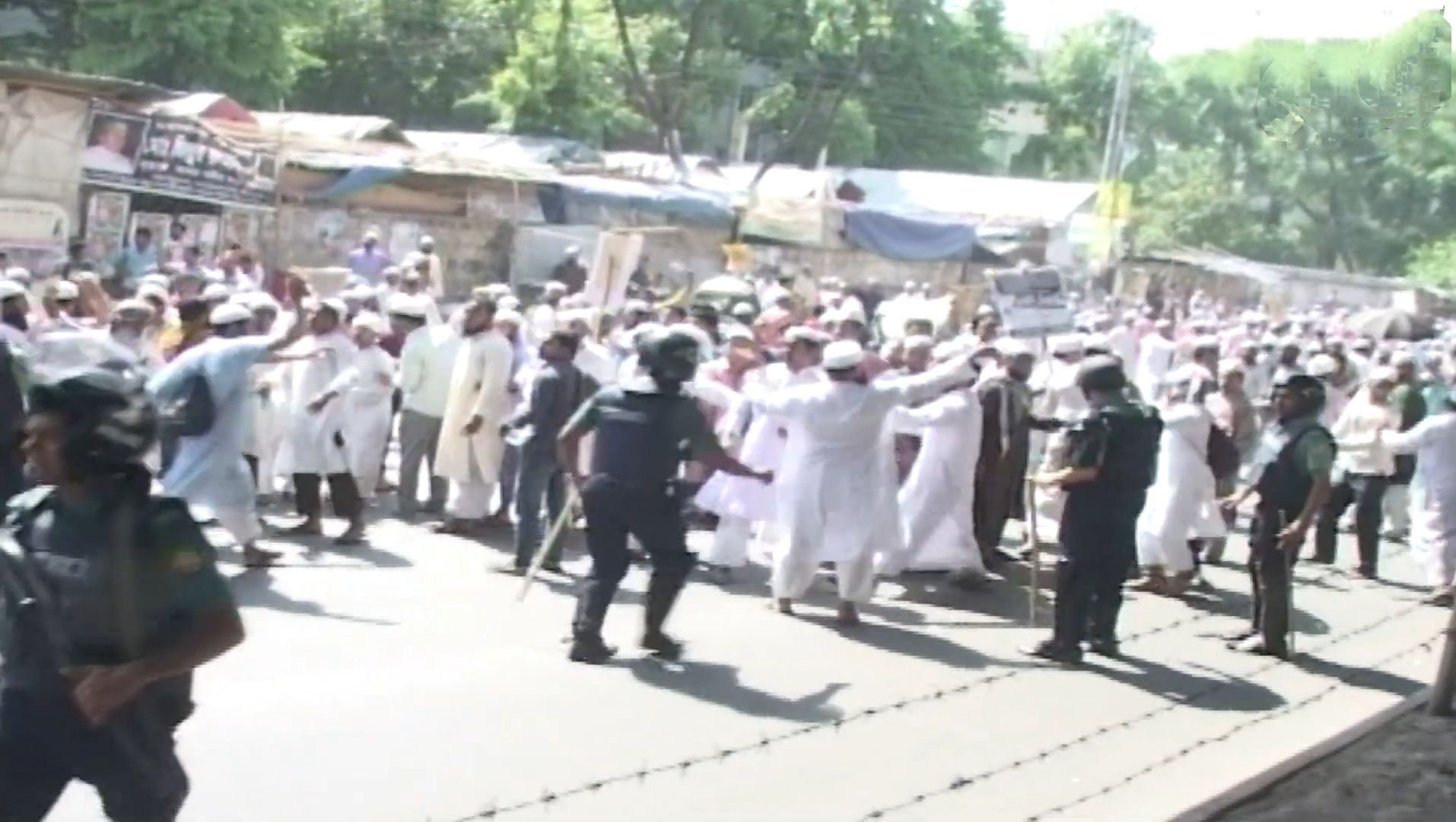
- Date: 16 September 2020 – 20 September 2020
- Location: Darul Uloom Hathazari
- Status: Successful

Parties
Madrasa Student	Madrasa Teacher

Lead figures
Junaid Babunagari	Ahmad Shafi

Number
5000+	50+

On September 16, 2020, after the Zuhr prayer, students at the madrasa began protesting for various demands on the madrasa grounds, which caused disruption for the teachers. During the protest, they chanted various slogans and vandalized the room of Anas Madani. Additionally, the students repeatedly announced over the mosque's microphone to prevent any action by the administration inside the madrasa. A rally was also organized in Dhaka in support of the protest under the leadership of former vice president Nurul Haque Nur. In the afternoon, Moinuddin Ruhi, an associate of Anas Madani, was beaten by angry students who accused him of sowing the seeds of irregularities and anarchy in Hathazari Madrasa.

The students initiated this protest with five demands. Subsequently, a leaflet was circulated in the madrasa to formally present these demands. The demands are as follows:

1. Anas Madani must be immediately expelled from the madrasa.
2. Students must be provided with adequate institutional facilities and all forms of harassment must cease.
3. Shah Ahmed Shafi should be granted due respect by removing him from the position of director, given his incapacity, and appointing him as an advisor.
4. The complete rights and appointments of teachers should be entrusted to the Majlis-e-Shura.
5. The rightful members of the previous Majlis-e-Shura should be reinstated and controversial members removed from their positions.

== Alleged militancy ==
There are allegations that the Madrassah is a training ground for Islamic extremists. While authorities of the school have confirmed that some graduates volunteered for the Afghan jihad during the 1980s, there was no strong evidence to suggest that the school itself was recruiting for the jihad.

The rector of the school, Maulana Ahmad Shafi—popularly known as "Boro Huzur" (the eldest scholar)—is also the chairman of a faction of the political party Islami Oikya Jote. Critics of the party say that membership of IOJ coincides with the Harkat-ul-Jihad al-Islami (HuJI), though a leading Bangladeshi political scientist warns little is actually known about their organisation.

Rector Ahmad is also purported to be the leader of a group called "Hifazat-e-Islam," which he claims to be a peaceful organisation. Ahmad and his colleagues state that the group is for protesting the government's decisions to introduce a secular education system. A statement from the police mentions that men, suspected to be from Hifazat-e-Islam, fired gunshots and threw homemade bombs on the police, causing injuries to 5 or 6 police constables. It is unclear whether or not these actions were approved by Ahmad Shafi.

== Alumni scholars ==
The Jamiah Darul Ulum Moinul Islam has produced a large number of notable scholars.

- Shah Ahmad Hasan
- Mufti Faizullah
- Faqihul Millat Mufti Abdur Rahman
- Ashraf Ali Bishwanathi
- Allama Shah Ahmad Shafi
- Mufti Izharul Islam
- Junaid Babunagari
- Nurul Islam Jihadi
- Sajidur Rahman
- Zia Uddin
- Muhammad Yunus
- Yahya Alampuri
- Abdul Quddus
- Hifzur Rahman
