= Muhammad Yunus (scholar) =

Bangladeshi Islamic scholar (1906–1992)

Shaykh al-Arab wal-Ajam Haji Muhammad Yunus
- হাজী মুহম্মদ ইউনুস

Rector of Al Jamia Al Islamia Patiya
- In office 1959–1992
- Preceded by: Azizul Haq
- Succeeded by: Harun Islamabadi

President of Befaqul Madarisil Arabia Bangladesh
- In office 1978–1992
- Preceded by: Post established
- Succeeded by: Harun Islamabadi

President of Idarat al-Maʿarif
- In office 1969–1976
- Preceded by: Shamsul Haque Faridpuri

Personal details
- Born: Muhammad Yunus Choudhury; 1906 Hathazari, Chittagong District, Bengal Presidency
- Died: 14 February 1992 (aged 85–86) Upasham Hospital, Chittagong, Bangladesh
- Resting place: Maqbara-e-Azizi, Al Jamia Al Islamia Patiya

Personal life
- Children: 7 sons and 3 daughters
- Education: Darul Uloom Hathazari; Darul Uloom Deoband

Religious life
- Religion: Islam
- Denomination: Sunni
- Jurisprudence: Hanafi
- Movement: Deobandi

Muslim leader
- Teacher: Habibullah Qurayshi; Shah Abdul Wahhab; Saeed Ahmad Sandwipi; Muhammad Faizullah; Siddiq Ahmad; Izaz Ali Amrohi; Asghar Hussain Deobandi; Idris Kandhlawi; Hussain Ahmad Madani; Shabbir Ahmad Usmani; Muhammad Tayyib Qasmi; Zakariyya Kandhlawi; Muhammad Shafi
- Disciple of: Zamiruddin Ahmad
- Students: Abdul Halim Bukhari
- Influenced by: Ashraf Ali Thanwi; Shamsul Haque Faridpuri
- Influenced: Sultan Zauq Nadvi; A F M Khalid Hossain

Muhammad Yunus Choudhury (Bengali: মুহম্মদ ইউনুস চৌধুরী; 1906 – 14 February 1992), popularly known as Haji Muhammad Yunus (Bengali: হাজী মুহম্মদ ইউনুস), was a Bangladeshi Islamic scholar and educationist. He was the second rector of Al Jamia Al Islamia Patiya, former president of Idarat al-Maʿarif and an active member of the Muslim World League. As the founding president of Befaqul Madarisil Arabia Bangladesh, Yunus contributed to the establishment and renovation of roughly 1500 madrasas in Bangladesh. He was awarded the title of Shaykh al-ʿArab wa al-ʿAjam by the Imam of Masjid al-Haram.

== Early life and family ==
Muhammad Yunus Choudhury was born in 1906 to a Bengali Muslim family of Choudhuries in the village of Rahimpur in Hathazari, Chittagong District, Bengal Presidency. His father, Abdul Jabbar Choudhury, was a zamindar and his mother, Begum Riazunnesa, was a housewife. The family were claimed to be descended from Abu Bakr RadiAllahu ‘Anhu, the 1st Caliph of Islam. His father died when he was aged four years.

== Education ==
Yunus's education began at the age of c. 5 years old at the local primary school. His Quranic studies began a year later which he completed in two years. His mother, Begum Riazunnesa, then entrusted Choudhury to Qari Maqbul Ahmad Barisali of Darul Uloom Hathazari to perfect his Quranic studies. After completing the Qur'an for a second time under Barisali at the age of 9 and three quarters, Yunus then studied Bahishti Zewar and other books under Qari Ibrahim, the imam of Darul Uloom Hathazari Central Mosque. Yunus became very much influenced by the teachings of Ashraf Ali Thanwi, the author of Bahishti Zewar. In the following year, Yunus began his studies of the Persian language. During Ramadan, he began studying the Gulistan under Habibullah Qurayshi. After that, Yunus officially enrolled into the Jamat-e-Hashtum (secondary) and studied up until Jamat-e-Ula (bachelors) level. Among his teachers were Habibullah Qurayshi, Saeed Ahmad Sandwipi, Shah Abdul Wahhab, Muhammad Faizullah, Siddiq Ahmad and Zamiruddin Ahmad.

After completing his studies at Darul Uloom Hathazari, Yunus set off for the Darul Uloom Deoband seminary in Saharanpur, India on the advice of his murshid Zamiruddin Ahmad in 1932. He spent five years in Deoband, completing his studies from Dawra-e-Hadith (Masters), philosophy and tafsir. He then completed his hifz under Atiqur Rahman. Among his teachers in Deoband were Izaz Ali Amrohi, Asghar Hussain Deobandi, Muhammad Idris Kandhlawi, Hussain Ahmad Madani, Shabbir Ahmad Usmani, Muhammad Tayyib Qasmi, Zakariyya Kandhlawi and Muhammad Shafi.

=== Sufism ===
Yunus' journey into tasawwuf began at the age of eleven under his teacher Zamiruddin Ahmad in Hathazari. Before setting off for Deoband, Ahmad granted him khilafat (spiritual succession). During his studies in India, Yunus would enter upon Ashraf Ali Thanwi and would spend the last ten nights of Ramadan participating in iʿtikāf with Thanwi. Yunus eventually received khilafat from Thanwi's disciple Muhammad Musa Muhajir-e-Makki.

== Career ==
After returning to Bengal, Yunus set off for Hajj with Zamiruddin Ahmad and Azizul Haq. During this pilgrimage, the decision to establish Al Jamia Al Islamia Patiya was made. Azizul Haq returned to Bengal after completing Hajj and established it whilst Yunus remained in Mecca. Yunus eventually returned to Bengal in 1945, and became a teacher at the Azizia Primary School. (Note: According to Abdus Salam Chatgami, Yunus went straight to teaching at Al Jamia Al Islamia Patiya upon his return) After that, he joined the staff at Patiya, where he served various roles such as Secretary of Education and Vice-Principal, eventually becoming the Principal or Director-General in 1959. Yunus served this role until his death.

Yunus became a member of the Mecca-based Muslim World League in 1974. Yunus delivered a notable speech during a four-day Muslim World League conference held in Mecca between 20 September and 23 September 1975. He represented the People's Republic of Bangladesh at the Asia Conference for the Mosque Committee held in Karachi in 1987. In 1979, Yunus also nominated to represent the country at the 3rd International Seerah Conference in Doha, Qatar.

Yunus was the founding president of Befaqul Madarisil Arabia Bangladesh, which is the largest Qawmi education board in Bangladesh. In 1959, he established the Anjuman-e-Ittihadul Madaris Bangladesh alongside Azizul Haq. Azizul Haq died within three years of its establishment and so Yunus singlehandedly took the lead thereafter. In 1986, Yunus founded and became the president of the Islamic Conference Organisation, with Abdul Halim Bukhari as its general secretary. It was inaugurated at the Chittagong Circuit House field in front a massive audience. Currently, international Islamic conferences are held in Bangladesh through this organisation.

The establishment and renovation of 1500 mosques and madrasas in Bangladesh are credited to Muhammad Yunus. He is the sponsor of all of Chittagong's traditional madrasas. In 1979, he donated Sahih al-Bukhari books to Al Jameatul Arabiatul Islamia Jiri. He was also a member of the Majlis-e-Shura of Al-Jamiatul Ahlia Darul Ulum Moinul Islam, and appointed Shah Ahmad Shafi to the position as the university's rector. After the death of Shamsul Haque Faridpuri, Yunus became the second president of the Idarat al-Maʿarif. Two months before his own death, Yunus took to the initiative of establishing the Bangladesh Islamic Research Council. His successor, Harun Islamabadi, completed this initiative.

Yunus was also involved in the propagation of Islam into Bandarban Hill District. In 1989, he established the Bandarban Islamic Education Centre which currently is home to an Islamic library, an an-Nadi ath-Thaqafi literary society, Shaykh Yunus Student's Library, Abul Hasan Ali Nadwi Auditorium, Technical Training Centre, orphanage and hospital. It is currently headed by his son, Husain Muhammad Yunus. Yunus also established a madrasa in Rangunia in 1986 to counter the progress of Christian missionaries in the area. The complex is also home to a hospital, a New Muslim Rehabilitation Project, an agricultural farm and a women's madrasa education department. It is the largest madrasa in Rangunia and is currently led by Mir Qasim.

Yunus founded a madrasa adjacent to a small mosque located to the south of Rangamati Road in Chittagong District in 1973. He named this madrasa as Faizia Tajweed al-Quran Madrasa after his teacher, Muhammad Faizullah. It is currently led by Jahedullah Chatgami and 31 teachers and hosts 700 students. With the assistance of Ali Salem of the United Arab Emirates, Yunus founded a hospital in Sukhbilas, Rangunia in 1983. The hospital was completed in 1988, and by 1990, it hosted 30 wards. He also founded the Bangladesh Tahfizul Quran Organisation in 1976, which holds national hifz competitions annually. In 1991, Yunus founded the Islamic Relief Committee to aid the victims of the 1991 Bangladesh cyclone. On 26 December of the same year, he established the Tanzim-e-Ahl-e-Haq organisation. Haji Muhammad Yunus is also the founder of the anti-socialist Anjuman-e-Tahaffuz-e-Islam organisation as well as the Furqania Organisation which provides Islamic education to children.

=== Contributions to developing Jamia Patiya ===
Yunus invited Mohammad Al Subail, the Imam of Masjid al-Haram, without any formality to Al Jamia Al Islamia Patiya's annual conference in 1979. Yunus played an important role in transforming to Patiya into an international Islamic university. He was also visited in Patiya by Yusuf al-Qaradawi in 1979 as well as Abdullah bin Muhammad Al Zahim (Imam of Masjid an-Nabawi), Abul Hasan Ali Hasani Nadwi, Sayyid Yusuf ar-Rifai, Ahmad bin Abdulaziz al-Mubarak, Muhammad Tayyib Qasmi, Muhammad Shafi, Yusuf Banuri, Zafar Ahmad Usmani, Yaqub Qasmi, Abdullah Omar Nasseef, Abdul Majid Nadeem, Taqi Usmani, Bashir ash-Shikhfa (Governor of Al Ain), Dr. Alwani, Jalal ad-Din Sayrwan, Nur ad-Din ad-Dimashqi and Sultan bin Muhammad Al-Qasimi (Emir of Sharjah).

His first developmental move was to reform the education system at Patiya. He divided it into several divisions:

- Kindergarten
- Primary
- Secondary
- Higher
- Bachelors/Degree

After the bachelors level, he also introduced different faculties such as the Tajweed and Tafsir division, Higher Islamic Law and Research division, Higher Bengali Literature and Research division and Higher Arabic Literature and Research division. The Higher Islamic Law and Research division and Higher Bengali Literature and Research division were the first of any kind in Bangladesh. Yunus composed a constitution for Jamia Patiya in 1960.

The Imam of Masjid al-Haram, Mohammad Al Subail, conferred upon Yunus the title of Shaykh al-Arab wal-Ajam (Shaykh of Arabs and non-Arabs). Yunus completed the Hajj pilgrimage 57 times in his lifetime. For this reason, Azizul Haq would call him Haji Saheb and he became famous as Haji Yunus across the country. Abul Hasan Ali Hasani Nadwi referred to him as the "Guardian of the Ulama".

Yunus established the three-storey Al Jamia Al Islamia Patiya Central Mosque, which is among the large mosques of Bangladesh. He also established a large building for the university on the southern part of the campus. The building hosts an auditorium in its third floor with a capacity of 5000 people. Behind this building, Yunus established a four-storey students accommodation hall known as Dar-e-Jadid as well as a small mosque. Two stories of Dar-e-Jadid were completed during his lifetime. He also founded a three-storey hefzkhana (hifz building) in front of the new building and established a four-storey building for the Foundation towards 1987. Yunus is also credited for the establishment of the two-storey hammam, a deep tube well, five quarters and two ponds within the university campus.

During his visit to Saudi Arabia in 1971 with Abdur Rahman (scholar), Amjad Ali Khan and Ramizuddin Bengali, Yunus met with the pro-vice chancellor of the Islamic University of Madinah. Yunus secured an educational agreement allowing Jamia Patiya's students to travel to the Islamic university for higher Islamic studies.

=== Literary contributions ===
Yunus sponsored various Bengali and Arabic magazines throughout his life. Monthly at-Tawhid is one of the magazines that has maintained continuity since its first publication by Yunus from Al Jamia Al Islamia Patiya in January 1971. Yunus was also the patron of the Darpan magazine which was published for some time by the Bengali department of Jamia Patiya. Yunus established the 'Arabic Language Complex Bangladesh' to assist the Arabic language movement of Bangladesh. From this institution, the As-Subh al-Jadid (The New Morning) was published and edited by Sultan Zauq Nadvi. This magazine was later replaced by another Arabic magazine by the name of At-Tabligh (The Propagation). A wall magazine called Al-Aziz was released from 1980, which was later replaced by Al-Fakhr al-Jadid.

Another successful publication under his initiative was Balagh as-Sharq (Message of the East). This Arabic-English magazine is currently edited by Obaidullah Hamzah.

== Political involvement ==
Haji Muhammad Yunus was directly and indirectly involved in the politics of erstwhile Pakistan and Bangladesh throughout his life. His political influences were Siddiq Ahmad and Athar Ali Bengali. The litterateur Sirajuddin Imam wrote:

His walk in the political arena was also great. He did not separate religion and politics. After his student life, he participated in the anti-colonial movement led by the Jamiat Ulema-e-Hind.

He played an active role in promoting Islamic values in Pakistan. In 1969, he gave a speech at the Nizam-e-Islam Party's press conference in Karachi. He was also present in the press conference jointly held by the Nizam-e-Islam and Jamiat Ulema-e-Islam in 1986. After the independence of Bangladesh in 1971, he was selected as the patron of the Nizam-e-Islam Party. He said with regards to politics:

If you want to preserve the madrasas and the religion, then set some of the madrasa's salary and give it to one worker in the cause of politics

He played an active role in establishing Bangladesh Islamic Student Society. During the Bangladesh Liberation War in 1971, Haji Muhammad Yunus gave shelter to General Ziaur Rahman in Al Jamia Al Islamia Patiya. For this reason, the Pakistan Army bombed the madrasa.

== Personal life ==
After returning from Hajj, 30-year old Muhammad Yunus married the daughter of Abdul Aziz Rahimpuri from his village. He had sevens sons and three daughters from this marriage. His sons were: Yusuf, Hasan, Husayn, Jahedullah, Abdul Mannan, Muzzammil and Khaled. He also married Rasheda Murshida Begum, who was the daughter of his pir Zamiruddin Ahmad. However, she died one year after the marriage.

== Death and legacy ==
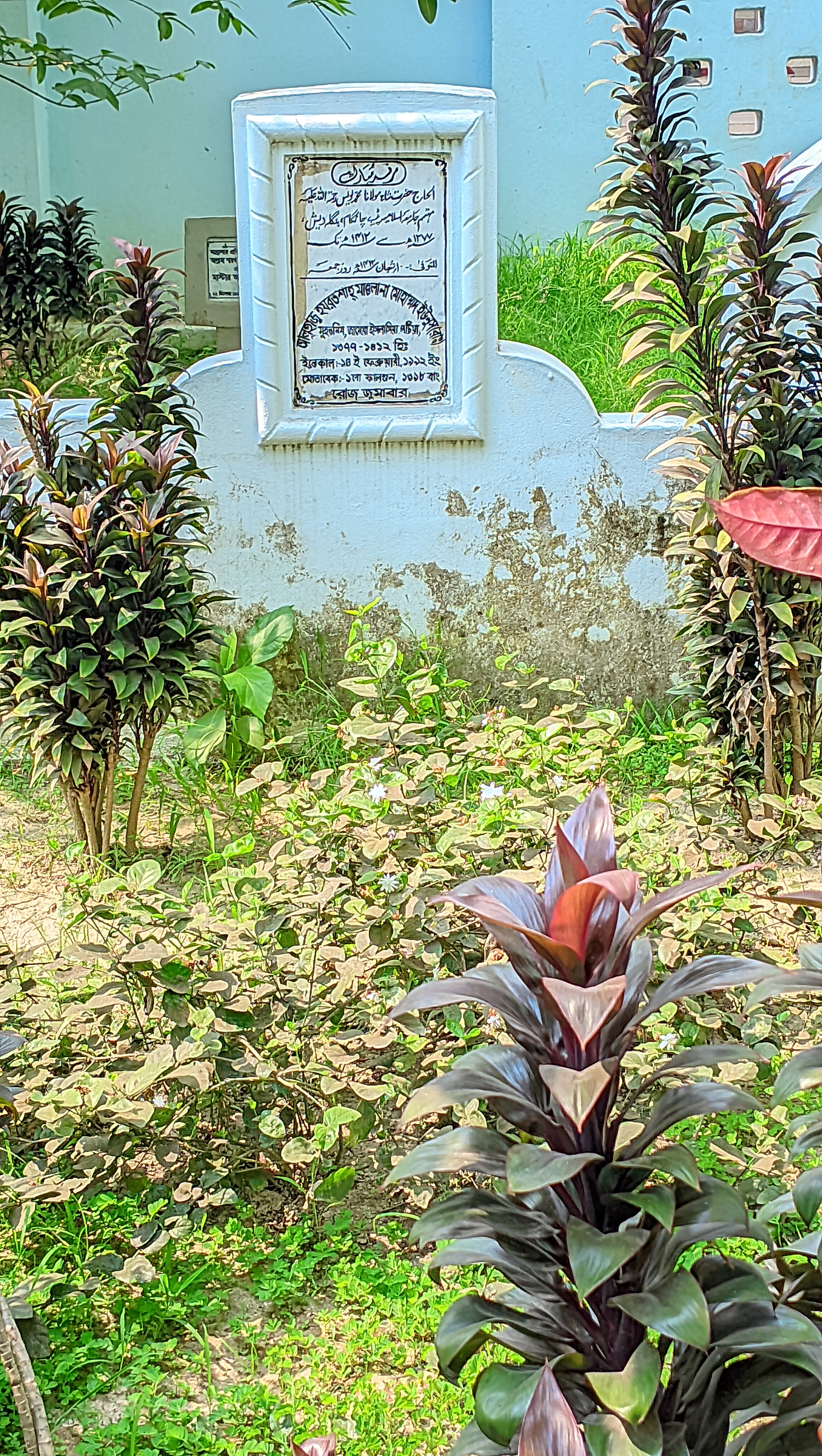
Gravestone

Haji Muhammad Yunus fell ill at the start of 1992. He was taken to Upasham Hospital in Chittagong, where he died on 14 February. His janaza was held the next day at Al Jamia Al Islamia Patiya grounds and was led by Alia Ahmad Boalvi. He was then buried at the Maqbara-e-Aziz next to Azizul Haq.< Following his death, several magazines and journals in Saudi Arabia such as the Okaz and Al Madina published biographies on him. In 2014, Muhammad Habibullah released his book titled 'Allama Shah Haji Muhammad Yunus Rah: Life, Works, Contributions'. In memory of Haji Muhammad Yunus, the Allama Shah Yunus Rah Academy was founded in Hathazari.
