= Sultan Ahmad Nanupuri =

Bangladeshi Islamic scholar

Imām al-ʿĀrifīn Shah Sultan Ahmad Nanupuri
- সুলতান আহমদ নানুপুরী

Personal life
- Born: Shah Sultan Ahmad; 26 June 1914 Dharmapur, Chittagong District, Bengal Province
- Died: 16 August 1997 (aged 83) Al-Jamiah Al-Islamiah Obaidia Nanupur, Bangladesh
- Spouse: Momena Khatun
- Children: 2
- Education: Darul Uloom Deoband

Religious life
- Religion: Islam
- Denomination: Sunni
- Jurisprudence: Hanafi
- Movement: Deobandi

Muslim leader
- Teacher: Muhammad Faizullah; Hussain Ahmad Madani; Ibrahim Balyawi; Izaz Ali Amrohi
- Disciple of: Hussain Ahmad Madani; Azizul Haq
- Disciples: Jamir Uddin Nanupuri
- Students: Abdur Rahman (scholar) Muhibbullah Babunagari Sultan Zauq Nadvi

Principal of Al-Jamiah Al-Islamiah Obaidia Nanupur
- In office 1958–1995
- Succeeded by: Zamiruddin Nanupuri

Shah Sultan Ahmad Nanupuri (Bengali: শাহ সুলতান আহমদ নানুপুরী; 26 June 1914 – 16 August 1997), also known by his daak naam Badshah, was a Bangladeshi Islamic scholar, teacher and author. He established numerous madrasas in Bangladesh and was the founding principal of Al-Jamiah Al-Islamiah Obaidia Nanupur for seventeen years.

== Early life and family ==
Shah Sultan Ahmad was born on 26 June 1914, to a Bengali Muslim family in the village of Dharmapur, located under the Fatikchhari subdivision of the Bengal Province's Chittagong District. His father, Shah Fazlur Rahman, worked in Rangoon, British Burma and his mother, Umdah Khatun, was a housewife. His grandfather's great-grandfather, known as Akbar Shah, was a wali. His lineage is as follows; Sultan Ahmad ibn Fazlur Rahman ibn Hamid Ali ibn Qamar Ali ibn Kalu Ghazi ibn Akbar Shah. Among Fazlur Rahman's children, it was only him that did not die during childhood. When he was roughly two and a half years old, his mother died as a result of a cholera outbreak.

== Education ==
Sultan Ahmad's education began at a local maktab ran by Ubaydul Haq Mianji. When he reached the age of five, he joined the Garzania Primary School. After his father's instruction, he later joined the Himayah al-Islam Madrasa in Nanupur Kalu Munshirhat. There he began studying from Yazdaham to Jamate Shashum under the likes of Lal Miyan, Obaydul Hoque and Muhammad Faizullah.

In his final year, his father died. After completing his studies, his stepmother advised him to join the Darul Uloom Alia Madrasa in the city of Chittagong. Ahmad stayed there for a few months but did not enjoy the curriculum, and so returned home. Being influenced by his former teachers, he intended to re-enrol from Jamate Shashum at the Darul Uloom Deoband. He therefore travelled to Saharanpur in Hindustan to complete his studies in Deoband. He also briefly studied at the nearby Mazahir Uloom, before graduating (MA) from the faculty of Hadith studies at Darul Uloom Deoband and beginning his philosophy course. Among his teachers were Hussain Ahmad Madani, Izaz Ali Amrohi, Ibrahim Balyawi, Zahur Ahmed, Habibullah Mirathi and Riyaz ad-Din.

== Career ==
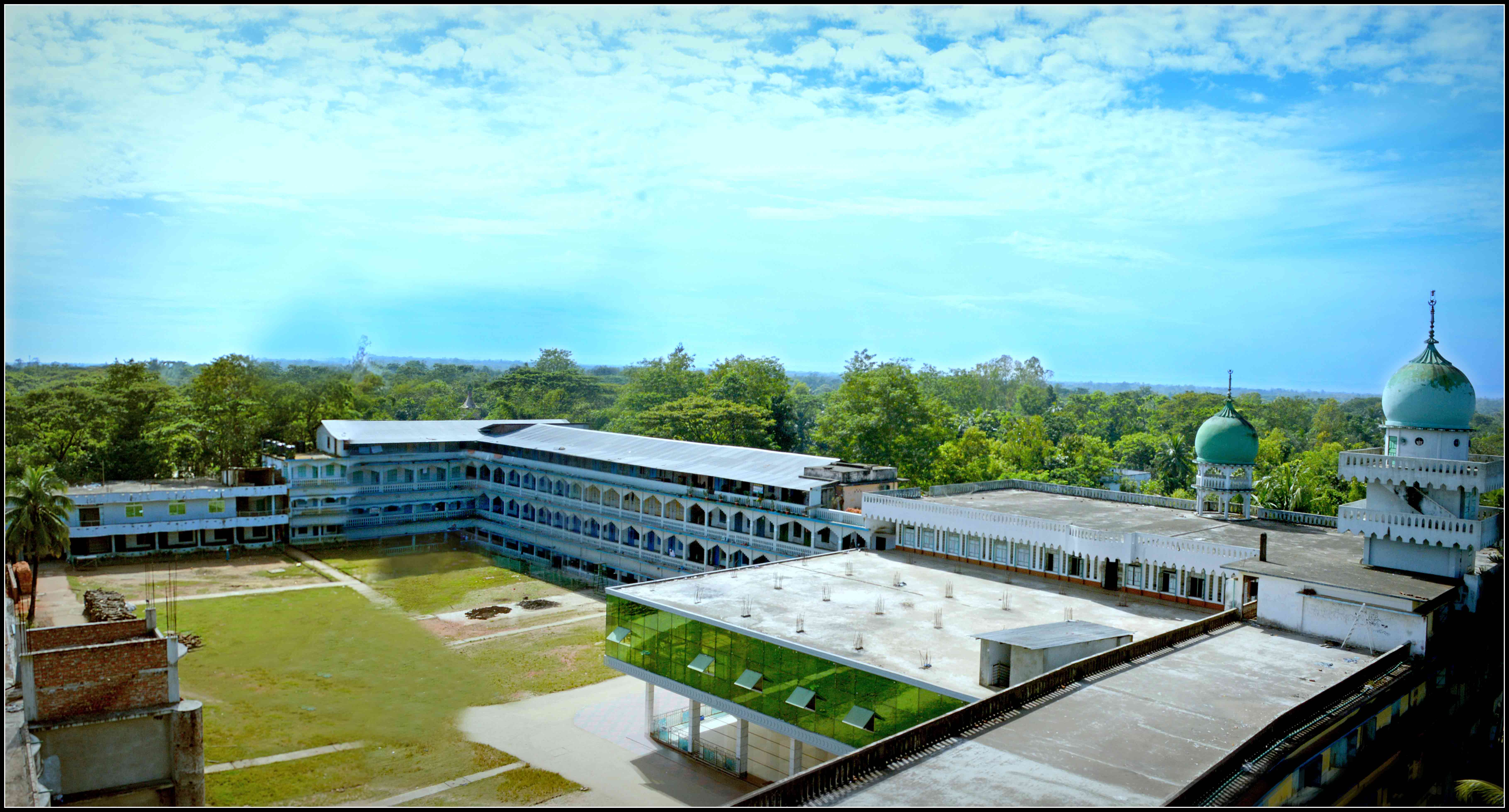
Sultan Ahmad became known as the Nanupuri Huzur from his long residence in Nanupur, particularly Al-Jamiah Al-Islamiah Obaidia Nanupur madrasa.

Sultan Ahmad Nanupuri reciting a Persian poem by Hafez.

During his studies in Deoband, Nanupuri served as an imam at the Deoband Central Mosque. After graduating and returning to Bengal, he sent a letter to join the faculty at the Al-Jamia al-Arabia Nasirul Islam in Nazirhat Bazar and was accepted to teach there. The erstwhile principal of the madrasa, Nur Ahmad, later employed Zafar Ahmad Usmani too. Usmani was a supporter of the All-India Muslim League, whilst Nanupuri strongly believed that religious institutions like the madrasa should be free from political influence. Nanupuri subsequently left and became a teacher at Al-Jamiatul Islamiah Azizul Uloom Babunagar for 15 years. Azizul Haq later instructed Nanupuri to become the acting principal, and later the founding principal of Al-Jamiah Al-Islamiah Obaidia Nanupur in 1961. He served in Nanupur for seventeen years in total, and then gave up the role to Zamiruddin Nanupuri. Among his notable students were Abdur Rahman (scholar), Muhibbullah Babunagari and Sultan Zauq Nadvi.

Among the other madrasas that he established are Al-Jamiah Al-Islamiyyah Bayt al-Huda and Al-Jamiah Al-Islamiyyah Azizul Uloom Pokkhali. He was also the founder of the Ar-Rashid monthly magazine.

== Personal life ==
During his education in Deoband, Nanupuri spent seven years under Hussain Ahmad Madani, pledging bay'ah to Madani on 18 November 1944. However, after the Partition of India in 1947, Nanupuri was unable to maintain a close relationship with Madani, and could not meet with Ashraf Ali Thanwi either as he was ill. Madani responded to Nanupuri in a letter giving him permission to master tasawuuf under a different Sufi scholar. Nanupuri then became a murid of Azizul Haq of Patiya, and received khilafah (spiritual succession) from him after 15 years.

Nanupuri first completed Hajj with his pir, Azizul Haq. In 1967, a businessman named Niamat Ali Sawdagar funded Nanupuri for Hajj. His third hajj took place in 1970, alongside Mohammed Younus and Abdur Rahman (scholar). His fourth and last hajj was in 1991, alongside Mufti Said Ahmad (founder of Jamia Sultania Lalpol) and Afsar Ahmad (Qari of Nanupur Madrasa).

On 21 January 1945, Nanupuri married Momena Khatun, the first daughter of Munshi Abdul Khaliq. They had four sons and six daughters, although two sons died at an early stage. His son, Imdadullah Nanupuri, is also an Islamic scholar and the principal of Al-Jamiah Al-Islamiyyah Bayt al-Huda.

== Death and legacy ==
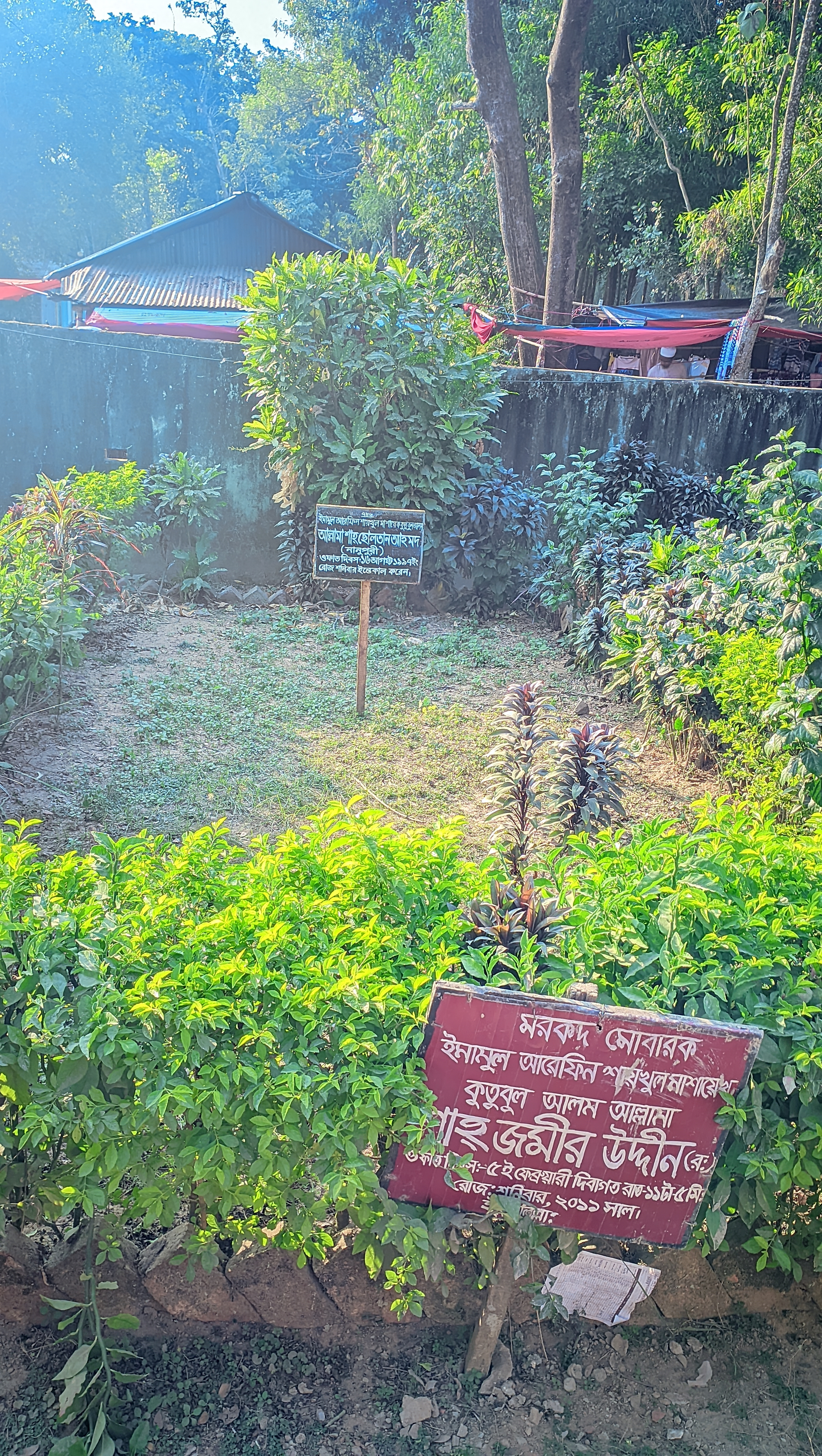
Graveyard

Nanupuri died on 16 August 1997 in his own room at Al-Jamiah Al-Islamiah Obaidia Nanupur, after being ill for three years. The next day, Ali Ahmad Boalvi led his janaza at the Nanupur Madrasa courtyard. Nanupuri's elder son Hussain Ahmad Nanupuri was unable to participate as he was in the United Arab Emirates at the time and so when he returned, Nanupuri's younger son Imdadullah Nanupuri led a second funeral prayer. After the prayer, Nanupuri was buried in the Maqbara-e-Sultania.

Nanupuri's leading khalifah (spiritual successor) Said Ahmad established a madrasa in Feni named after him as Al-Jamiah al-Islamiyyah as-Sultaniyyah. He also wrote a biography on his teacher titled "Shah Sultan Ahmad Nanupuri's life and teachings" which was published by the Hakimul Ulama Foundation Bangladesh. Shah Ahmad Ghani also wrote a biography on Nanupuri, and Abdul Majid Muhajir-e-Makki wrote an eleven-volume Urdu biography titled "Marif-e-Sultan". Abdus Salam Chatgami later edited the work and published it in two volumes. His disciples have founded numerous institutions and organisations in his name such as the Allama Shah Sultan Ahmad Foundation Bangladesh, and his speeches have been collected and published. In 2018, Al-Jamiah Al-Islamiyyah Bayt al-Huda began publishing a seasonal magazine named after him as the Samayiki As-Sultan. Among his other biographies are:

1. Hayat-e-Nanupuri Rah. (1999) - Professor Munawwar
2. Nanupuri Rah. Er Jibon O Dorshon (2000) - Imdadullah Nanupuri
3. Fuyuz-e-Sultani (2005) - Mawlana Rafiq
4. Kemon Chilen Nanupuri (2008) - Mahmudul Hasan
5. Mawayez-e-Sultan (2008) - Mufti Moinuddin (Chief Mufti of Basundhara Madrasa)
6. Malfuzat-e-Nanupuri
