= Emha Ainun Nadjib =

Indonesian writer

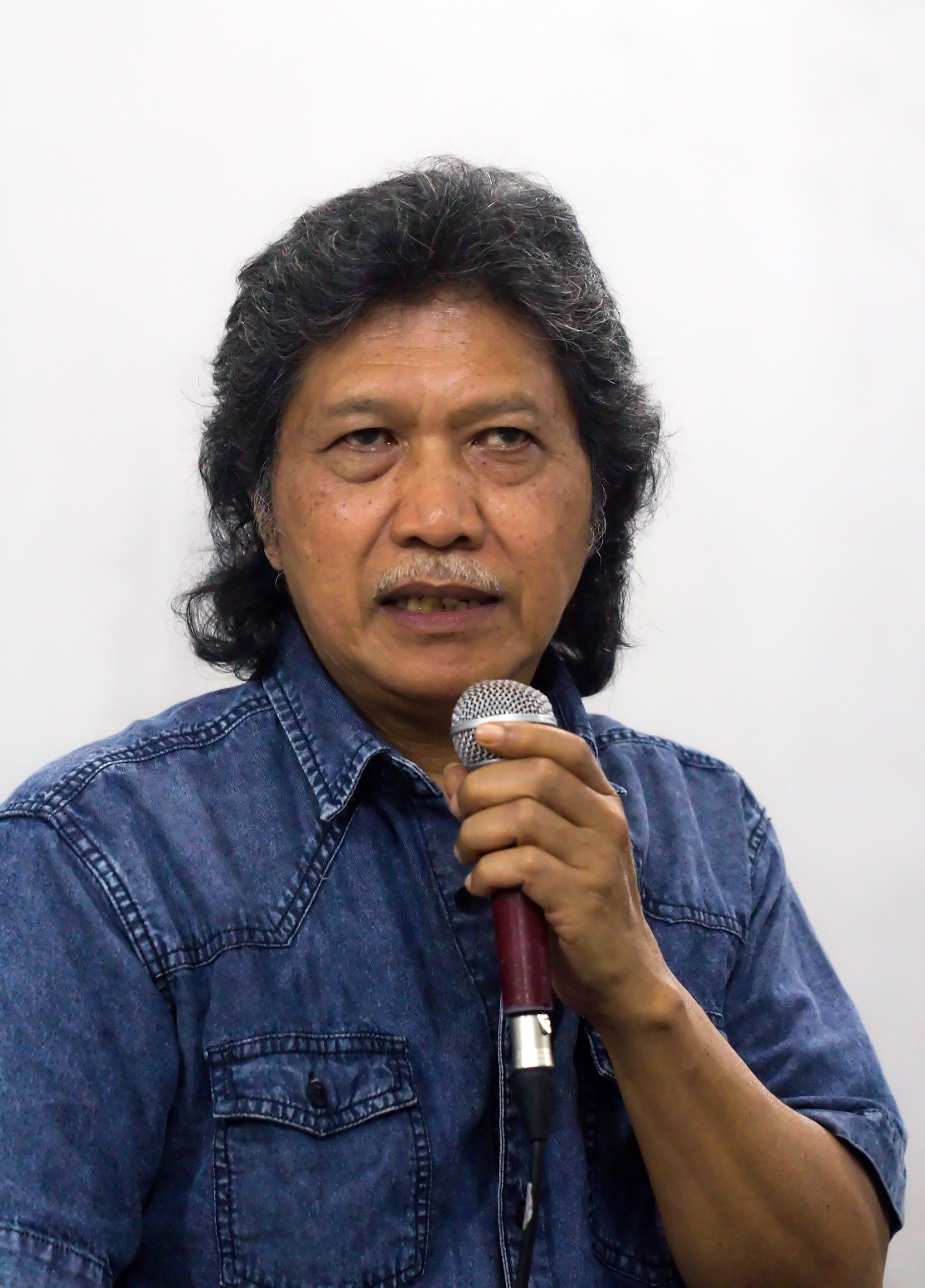
- Nadjib speaking in 2015
- Born: Muhammad Ainun Nadjib; 27 May 1953 (age 72); Jombang, East Java, Indonesia
- Occupations: Poet, essayist
- Spouse: Novia Kolopaking
- Children: 4
- Website: www.caknun.com

Muhammad Ainun Nadjib (born 27 May 1953), best known as Emha Ainun Nadjib or Cak Nun/Mbah Nun, is an Indonesian poet, essayist, kyai, ulama, and humanist. Born in Jombang, East Java, Nadjib began writing poetry while living in Yogyakarta, publishing his first collection in 1976. He became one of the city's predominant poets by the late 1980s, and by then had also began writing essays. He is the leader of the Kiai Kanjeng group, which stages dramas and musical performances on religious themes.

Early poems by Nadjib have elements of social criticism. However, more prominent are Islamic values, variously described as santri or Sufi. Islam is also a common subject for his essays. His writings have taken a variety of forms, including poetry, essays, novels, and short stories.

== Early life ==
Nadjib was born Muhammad Ainun Nadjib in Jombang, East Java, on 27 May 1953. The fourth of fifteen children, he began his education at the Pondok Modern Darussalam Gontor, a pesantren (Islamic boarding school) in Ponorogo. In his third year, Nadjib was expelled for leading a demonstration against school security. He later moved to Yogyakarta, where he studied at Muhammadiyah I Senior High School. He attended the economics program at Gadjah Mada University but did not graduate, leaving after one semester.

== Career ==
Nadjib lived in Yogyakarta for several years, serving as editor of Masa Kini magazine between 1973 and 1976 . In 1976 he published his first poetry collection, "M" Frustrasi dan Sajak Sajak Cinta. His 1978 poetry collection Sajak-Sajak Sepanjang Jalan won Tifa Sastra magazine's poetry-writing competition. He focused predominantly on his poetry during this period, studying from the Sufist poet Umbu Landu Paranggi, though he also established the Teater Dinasti theatre troupe. By the late 1980s, Nadjib, together with Iman Budhi Santosa, was considered one of the most senior poets of Yogyakarta. As his works, including his essays, sometimes satirized Suharto's authoritarian regime, he eventually required a security entourage.

For two years, from 1984 to 1986, Nadjib lived in Amsterdam and the Hague, the Netherlands, where he spent two years helping with workshops on religion, culture and development. He later described the experience as a critical juncture in his life. Nadjib returned to Indonesia, and his 1988 drama, Lautan Jilbab (Sea of Headscarves), broke the Indonesian record for audience size; Aprinus Salam of Gadjah Mada University writes that this can be attributed to the general populace's increased interest in religious materials. In 1991, Nadjib caused a stir when he left the Indonesian Association of Muslim Intellectuals, citing a difference in vision with the organization and a desire to be an "independent intellectual". In 1998 Nadjib was one of the Muslim intellectuals who spoke with Soeharto before his resignation.

Nadjib leads the Kiai Kanjeng group, which stages dramas and musical performances on themes of religious pluralism. It In 2001 the group, then known as Kiai Kanjeng Sepuh, released a recording of Islamic music and chants titled Bermusik kepada Allah, untuk Indonesia, Maiyah, Tanah Air. The group has toured throughout Indonesia, and internationally to such countries as Finland, Italy and Germany in 2006, and to the Netherlands in 2008. Nadjib considered the group a peacebuilder, as its international tours followed the 2005 Jyllands-Posten Muhammad cartoons controversy and controversy over Geert Wilders's 2008 film Fitna, respectively.

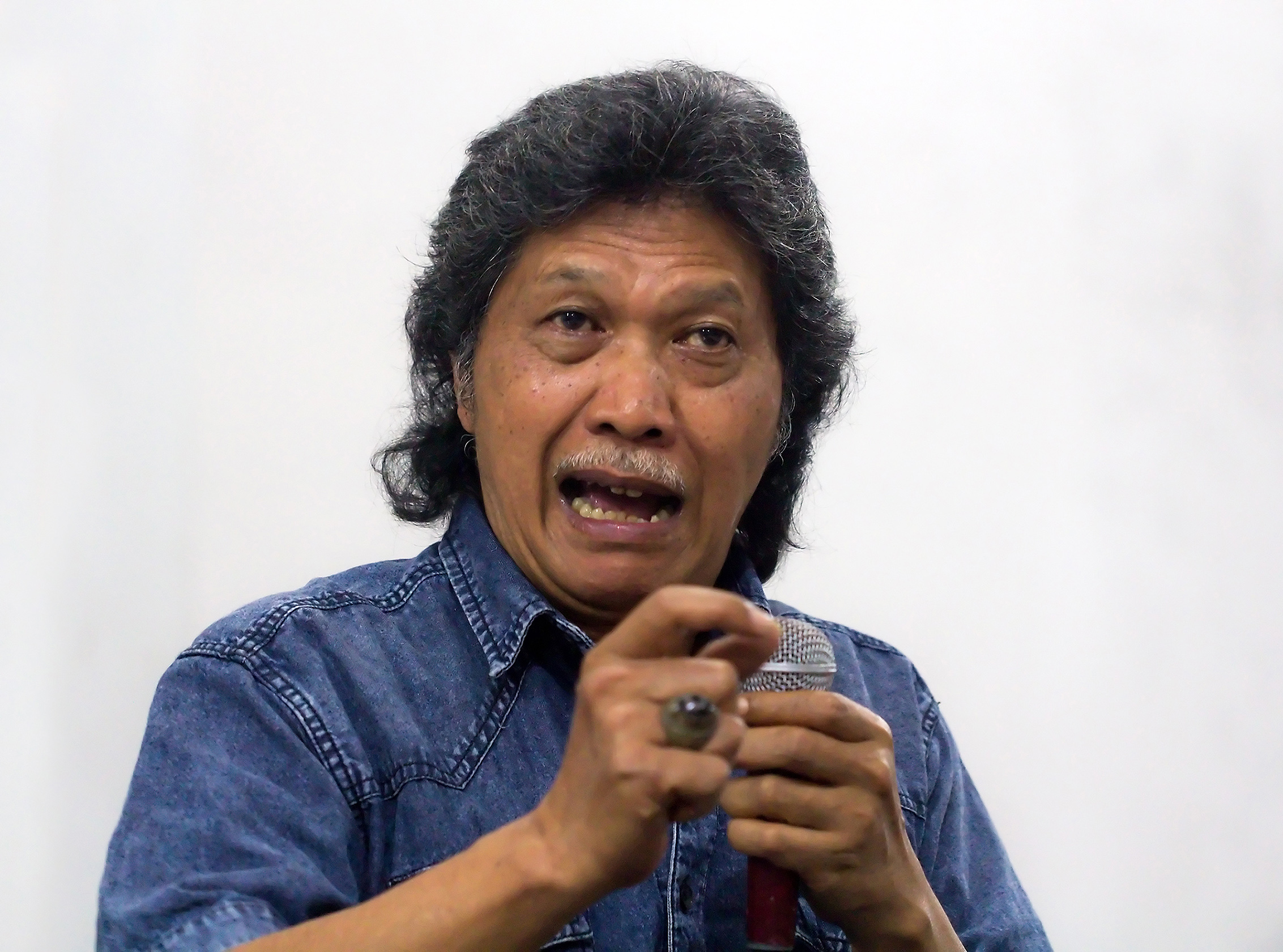
Nadjib speaking in 2015

Nadjib has frequently traveled through Indonesia to speak about Islamic values and spirituality, drawing thousands of people from a variety of faiths. In 2012 he was hosting five monthly discussions: Padhang Mbulan (in Jombang), Mocopat Syafaat (in Yogyakarta), Kenduri Cinta (in Jakarta), Gambang Syafaat (in Semarang), and Obor Ilahi (in Malang).

In 2005 Nadjib received The Muslim News' Award of Islamic Excellence. In 2006 he was named Seputar Indonesia's Person of the Year in the field of culture. In 2010 the Indonesian Ministry of Culture and Tourism gave him a Satyalencana Kebudayaan award.

Nadjib, who is commonly known by the nickname Cak Nun, lives in the Kadipiro subdistrict of Yogyakarta. He is married to the actress Novia Kolopaking. He has four sons: Sabrang, Hayya, Jembar, and Rampak. Sabrang, known by the stage name Noe, is the vocalist for the Indonesian band Letto, Jembar (Senior 2017-2018) and Rampak (Junior 2018-2019) is the Head of Cahaya Rancamaya Islamic Boarding School's Student's Council.

== Style and views ==
As with fellow Yogyakarta-based writers such as Kuntowijoyo and Mustofa W. Hasyim, Nadjib poems are heavily influenced by Islam. His Islamic influences have commonly been described as santri or orthodox, though Salam suggests that there are Sufistic influences as well. Nadjib has described his own poetry as "deeply religious and philosophical but esthetic".

Nadjib's views on Islam are those of tolerance. He has condemned the 2007 Indonesian Ulema Council fatwa which forbade religious pluralism, as well as regional-level sharia laws. He has supported the rights of Ahmadis to practice in Indonesia, and promoted open discourse with extremist groups as a method for mitigating their impact.

Much of Nadjib's earlier works deal with social criticism.

== Selected bibliography ==
By 2004 Nadjib had published 25 poetry collections. This selected bibliography is based on the ones compiled by Rampan (2000, pp. 146–47) and Nadjib (2012, p. 236).

=== Poetry collections ===
- "M" Frustrasi dan Sajak Sajak Cinta (1976)
- Tak Mati-Mati (1978)
- Sajak-Sajak Sepanjang Jalan (1978)
- 99 untuk Tuhan (1980)
- Nyanyian Gelandangan (1982)
- Suluk Pesisiran (1988)
- Syair Lautan Jilbab (1989)
- Seribu Masjid Satu Jumlahnya (1990)
- Sesobek Buku Harian Indonesia (1993)
- Tidur Yang Panjang (undated)

=== Collected essays ===
- Indonesia Bagian Sangat Penting dari Desa Saya (1980)
- Sastra yang Membebaskan (1984)
- Dari Pojok Sejarah: Renungan Perjalanan (1985)
- Slilit Sang Kiai (1991)
- Secangkir Kopi Pahit (1991)
- Markesot Bertutur (1992)
- Secangkir Kopi Jon Parkir (1992)
- Anggukan Ritmis Kaki Pak Kiai (1994)
- "Nasionalisme Muhammad": Islam Menyongsong Masa Depan (1995)
- Surat Kepada Kanjeng Nabi (1996)
- Tuhan pun "Berpuasa" (1997)
- Kafir Liberal (2005)
- Istriku Seribu: Polimonogami Monopoligami (2007)
- Orang Maiyah (2007)
- Kiai Bejo, Kiai Untung, Kiai Hoki (2007)

=== Other ===
- Yang Terhormat Nama Saya (short story collection; 1992)
- Arus Bawah (novel; 1995)
- BH (short story collection; 2005)

== Works cited ==
- Adityawarman (24 March 2011). "Menbudpar Sematkan Satyalencana Kebudayaan 2010" [Minister of Culture and Tourism grants the Satyalencana Kebudayaan for 2010]. Antara. Archived from the original on 6 March 2016.
- Amirrachman, Alpha (18 October 2008). "Emha Ainun Najib: Delivering the message of peace". The Jakarta Post. Archived from the original on 20 October 2016.
- Eneste, Pamusuk, ed. (1981). Leksikon Kesusastraan Indonesia Modern [Lexicon of Modern Indonesian Literature] (in Indonesian). Jakarta: Gramedia. OCLC 8785600.
- Hartono, Yusuf Susilo (17 November 2001). "Emha popularized 'maiyah' spiritual tunes". The Jakarta Post. Archived from the original on 5 March 2016.
- Nadjib, Emha Ainun (2012). Tuhan Pun "Berpuasa" [Even God "Fasts"]. Jakarta: Kompas. ISBN 978-979-709-656-4.
- Rampan, Korrie Layun (2000). Leksikon Susastra Indonesia [Lexicon of Indonesian Literature]. Jakarta: Balai Pustaka. ISBN 978-979-666-358-3.
- Salam, Aprinus (2004). Oposisi Sastra Sufi [Opposition of Sufi Literature] (in Indonesian). Yogyakarta: LKiS. ISBN 978-979-3381-64-0.
- "Sultan Hamengkubuwono X Dianugerahi People Of The Year 2007" [Sultan Hamengkubuwono X Named People Of The Year 2007]. Antara. 16 January 2008. Archived from the original on 23 September 2015.
- Wahyuni, Sri (18 March 2008). "Emha to perform in the Netherlands". The Jakarta Post. Archived from the original on 5 March 2016.
- Widiyanto, Asfa (2013). "Religious Pluralism and Contested Religious Authority in Contemporary Indonesian Islam: A. Mustofa Bisri and Emha Ainun Nadjib". In Jajat Burhanuddin; Kees van Dijk (eds.). Islam in Indonesia: Contrasting Images and Interpretations. ICAS publication series. Vol. 16. Amsterdam: Amsterdam University Press. pp. 161–71. ISBN 978-90-485-1625-4.
