= Abdul Halim Bukhari =

Bangladeshi Islamic scholar

Hakim al-Millat Abdul Halim Bukhari
- আব্দুল হালিম বুখারী
- Bukhari in 2021

Director General of Al Jamia Al Islamia Patiya
- In office 30 October 2008 – 21 June 2022
- Preceded by: Nurul Islam Qadim
- Succeeded by: Obaidullah Hamzah

Personal details
- Born: January 1945
- Died: 21 June 2022 (aged 77)
- Education: Al Jamia Al Islamia Patiya; University of Dhaka; Kagmari College

Personal life
- Political party: Nizam-e-Islam Party
- Main interests: Education; Hadith

Religious life
- Religion: Islam
- Denomination: Sunni
- Jurisprudence: Hanafi
- Movement: Deobandi

Muslim leader
- Students: A F M Khalid Hossain

Abdul Halim Bukhari (Bengali: আব্দুল হালিম বুখারী; January 1945 – 21 June 2022) was a Bangladeshi Islamic scholar, educator, and writer who was the director general of Al Jamia Al Islamia Patiya from 2008 until his death. He held the position of secretary general of Anjuman-e-Ittihadul Madaris Bangladesh from 1983, and from 2018, he served as an ex-officio standing committee member of Al-Haiatul Ulya Lil-Jamiatil Qawmia Bangladesh, the government-recognized apex body overseeing Qawmi madrasas. He also served as an advisor to Hefazat-e-Islam Bangladesh, member of Bangladesh Qawmi Madrasa Education Commission, chaired the Shariah Supervisory Committee of Shahjalal Islami Bank, and was president of both the Organization of Islamic Conference Bangladesh and the Organization of Tahfizul Quran Bangladesh. In addition to his educational and organizational roles, he was the editor-in-chief of Monthly At-Tawhid, a religious periodical published in Chittagong.

== Early life and education ==
Syed Abdul Halim Bukhari was born in January 1945 in the village of Rajghata, located in Lohagara, Chittagong District, into a Bengali Muslim family. His father, Syed Abdul Ghani Bukhari, was a descendant of Sayyid Ahmad Bukhari, who had migrated from Bukhara to Rangoon before settling in Chittagong.

Bukhari began his early education at the Rajghata Hossainia Azizul Uloom. He later enrolled at Al Jamia Al Islamia Patiya, where he earned a master's degree in Hadith studies in 1964, followed by further studies in Bengali literature. In addition to his religious education, he attained academic qualifications, including Alim and Kamil from Tangail Alia Madrasa, Fazil from Gopalpur Madrasa, and completed his Higher Secondary Certificate (HSC) at Kagmari College in Tangail. He also obtained a degree from the University of Dhaka and completed a two-year course in biochemistry at Dawn Homoeopathic College in Lahore.

== Career and role ==
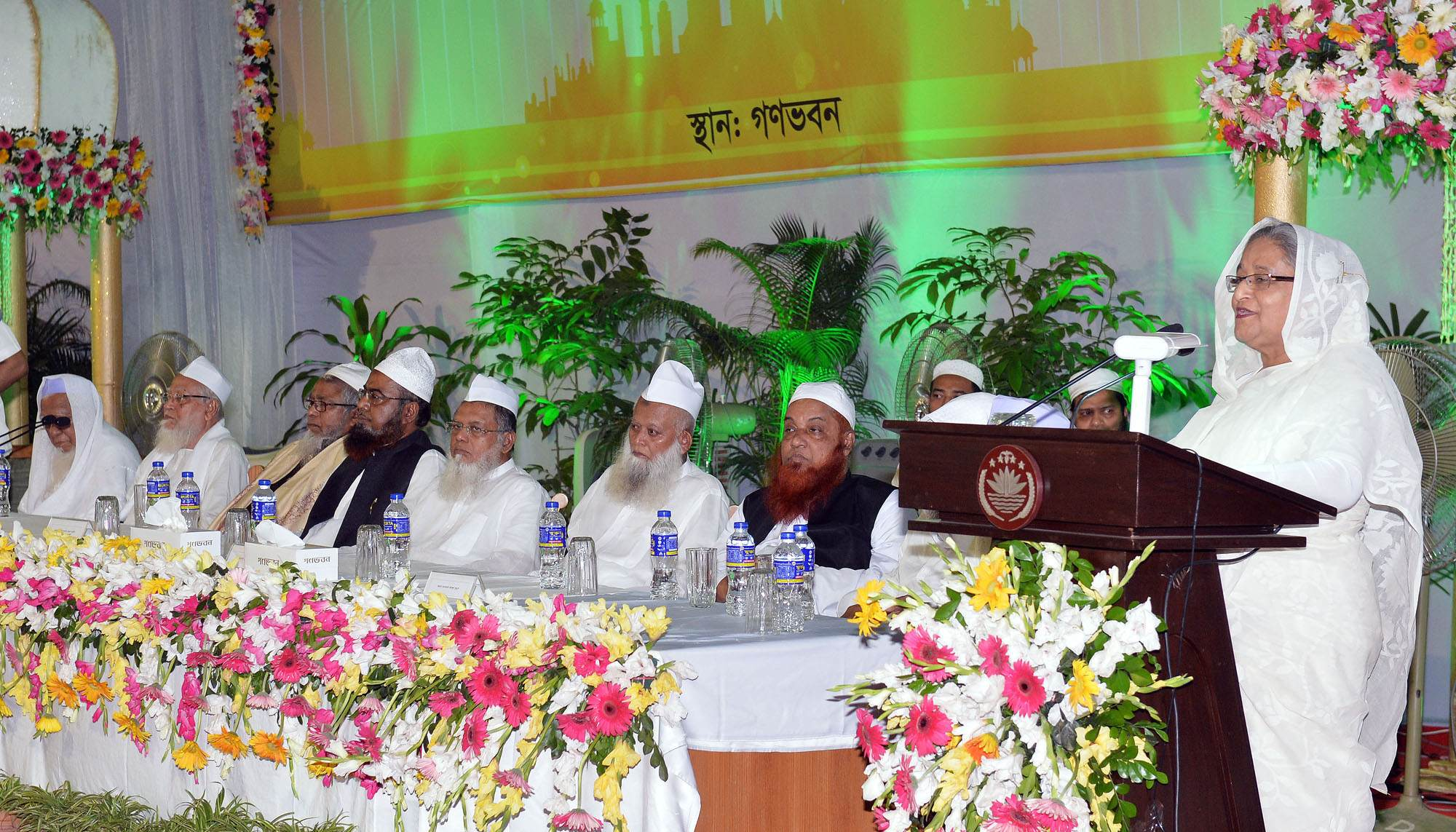
Bukhari at 2017 Qawmi ulama meeting with PM Hasina

Bukhari began his professional career in education. Between 1967 and 1968, he served as a lecturer in Arabic at Tangail Darul Uloom Alia, before taking up a similar position at Satkania Mahmudul Uloom Alia. In 1972, he returned to Tangail Darul Uloom Alia, where he held the position of Muhaddith and Shaikh al-Hadith until 1982. In 1982, he joined Al Jamia Al Islamia Patiya, a leading religious institution in Chittagong. From 2003 to 2008, he held the position of assistant director and was later appointed director general of the institution in 2008. Alongside his academic roles, he was active in educational administration. Since 1983, he had served as the secretary general of Anjuman-e-Ittehadul Madaris Bangladesh, one of the Qawmi madrasa education boards recognized by the government. He got a membership on 15 April 2012 in the Bangladesh Qawmi Madrasa Education Commission, which was formed to facilitate the official recognition of Qawmi madrasa degrees. He also held the presidency of the Organization of Tahfizul Quran Bangladesh, which operates under the administration of Al Jamia Al Islamia Patiya. In 2018, when Al-Haiatul Ulya Lil-Jamiatil Qawmia Bangladesh was established to confer formal recognition upon the Dawra-e-Hadith (master's-level Islamic studies) qualification of the Qawmi madrasa system, Bukhari was appointed to its standing committee. In 1986, the Organization of Islamic Conference Bangladesh was formed to coordinate religious discussions and events nationwide. Bukhari served as its general secretary from its founding until 2015, later becoming president after the death of his predecessor, Abdur Rahman.

Beyond his educational and organizational roles, Bukhari was also involved in the development of Islamic banking and finance. He served as Chairman of the Shariah Supervisory Committee of Shahjalal Islami Bank, providing guidance on compliance with Islamic finance principles. In 2020, he was elected to the Advisory Committee of Hefazat-e-Islam Bangladesh during its central convention held on 15 November. Earlier in life, Bukhari had been associated with the Nizam-e-Islam Party and was a follower of Siddique Ahmad, who led the party at the time. He contested the Amirabad constituency as a candidate in the 1996 national parliamentary election.

In addition to his administrative and teaching roles, Bukhari was involved in scholarly publishing. Since 1982, he had served as the editor-in-chief of At-Tawhid, the monthly magazine published by Al Jamia Al Islamia Patiya. His publications to Islamic literature include Tashilut Tahawi, Tashilul Usul, and Tashilut Tirmidhi, primarily focusing on Hadith studies. Bukhari's intellectual influence extended to other scholars, including A F M Khalid Hossain, who cited him as a source of inspiration. He was also associated with the Sufi tradition and was a spiritual disciple of Mohammad Ishaq, a successor in the lineage of Azizul Haque.

== Personal life and legacy ==
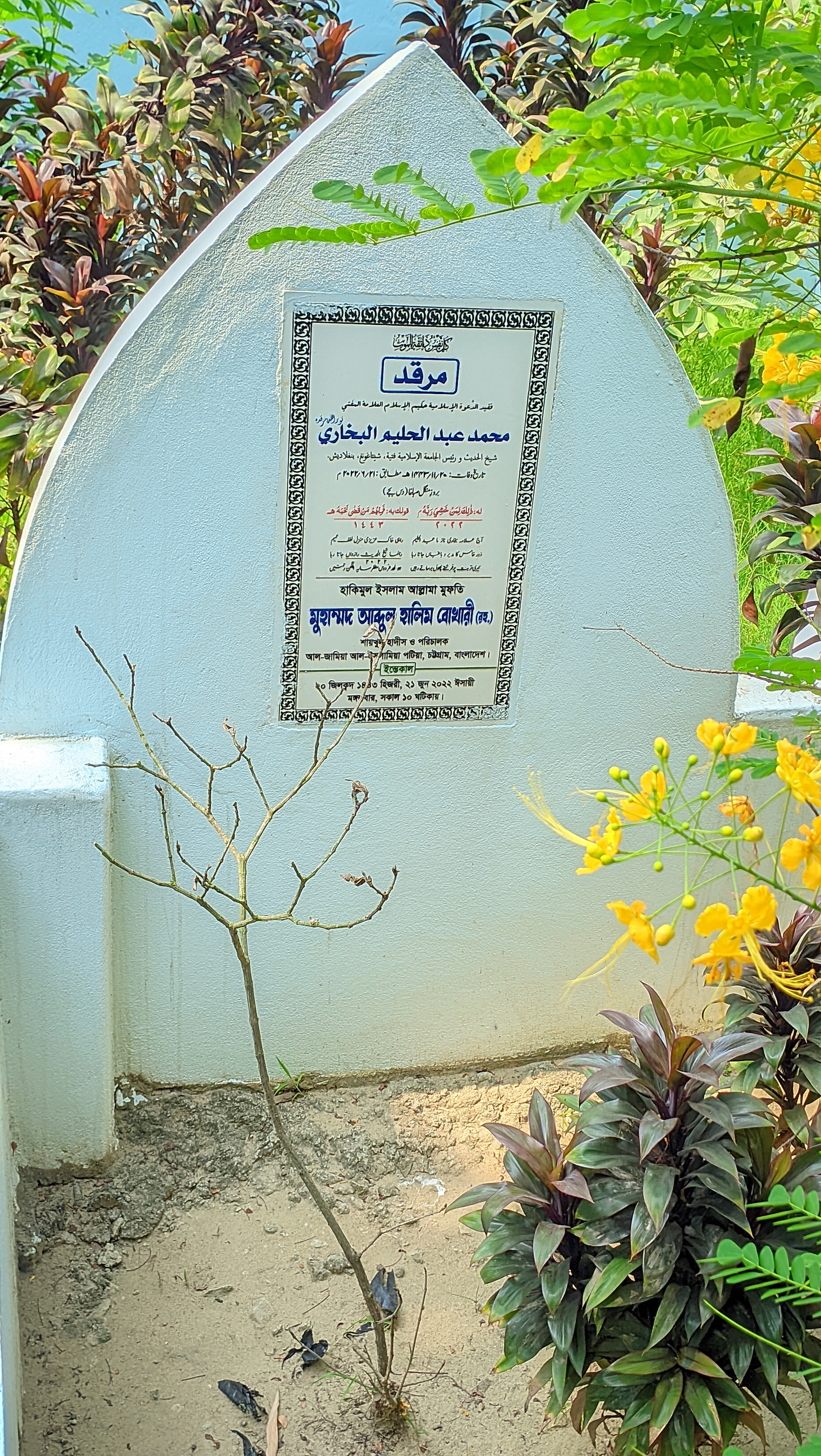
Bukhari's Gravestone in Patiya

Bukhari was the father of four sons and three daughters. He died on 21 June 2022 while receiving treatment for respiratory complications at CSCR Hospital in Chittagong. The Prime Minister of Bangladesh, Sheikh Hasina, expressed her condolences following his death.

His funeral was conducted on the premises of Al Jamia Al Islamia Patiya, and he was buried at the Azizia cemetery located within the madrasa compound. A commemorative event was organized in Dhaka on 18 August 2022, attended by religious scholars and community members. Obaidullah Hamzah was present as the chief guest at the gathering.

== See also ==
- List of Deobandis
