= Korrie Layun Rampan =

Indonesian writer (1953–2015)

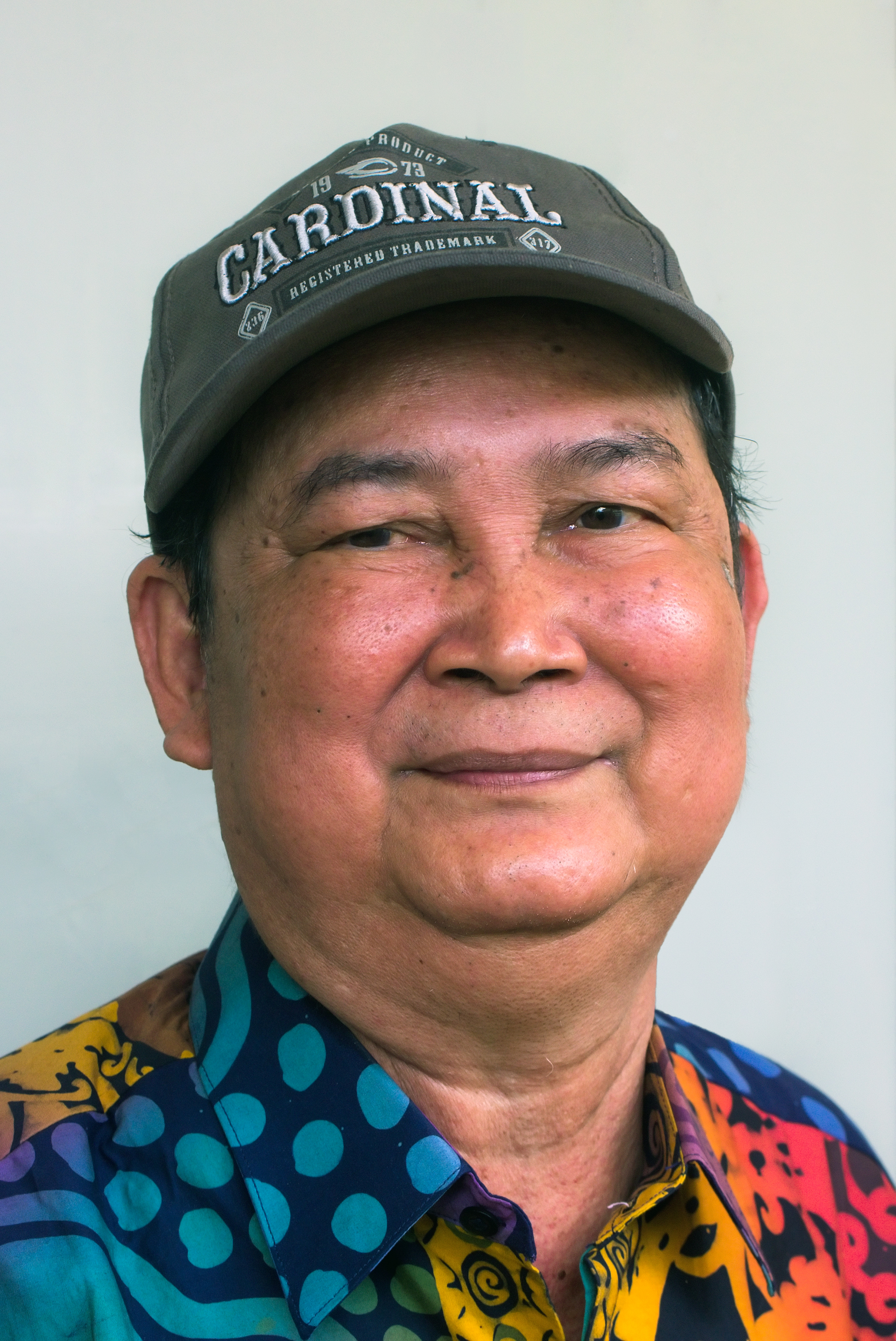
- Rampan in 2015
- Born: 17 August 1953; Samarinda, East Kalimantan, Indonesia
- Died: 19 November 2015 (aged 62); Jakarta, Indonesia
- Occupations: Writer; politician

Korrie Layun Rampan (17 August 1953 – 19 November 2015) was an Indonesian novelist, short story writer, poet, literary critic, journalist, and politician.

Born in Samarinda, East Kalimantan, he became interested in literature while in elementary school, writing numerous short stories and poems. While in university in Yogyakarta, he joined the Persada Studi Klub and began publishing his works in numerous national and regional newspapers. In 1976 his debut novel, Upacara, received second place in the Jakarta Arts Council Novel Competition. He wrote several hundred books, both fiction and non-fiction, and served as a council member for West Kutai Regency.

== Early life ==
Korrie Layun Rampan was born in Samarinda, East Kalimantan, on 17 August 1953 to Paulus Rampan, a retired sergeant in the Indonesian Army, and Martha Renihay. He completed his elementary school studies in four years; it was during his fourth year that he first began writing, inspired to do so after reading Hamka's novel Tenggelamnya Kapal van der Wijck. In junior high school he began reading such literary magazines as Sastra, Horison, Tjerpen, and Budaja Djaja, and throughout senior high school he wrote poetry for the school's wall magazine. He was also a presenter with the "Pancaran Sastra" program broadcast by the Samarinda branch of Radio Republik Indonesia (RRI). Owing to his academic prowess, Rampan received a scholarship from the provincial government which covered his junior high school, senior high school, and university education.

Rampan graduated from senior high school in Samarinda in 1970, moving to the city of Yogyakarta in Java to continue his studies. He had graduated from the Academy of Finance and Banking there by 1981. He later continued to Gadjah Mada University's Faculty of Social and Political Sciences. While in the city he became involved with the Persada Studi Klub, a group established in 1969 by such writers as Umbu Landu Paranggi, Iman Budhi Santosa, and Ragil Suwarna Pragolapati to allow young authors to publish in a dedicated section of the weekly Pelopor Yogya's culture column. He also began publishing his work in newspapers such as Kompas and Suara Karya as well as magazines such as Horison.

== Personal life ==
Rampan married Agustina Tri Wardhani on 10 July 1973. Their marriage produced four children and they divorced in 1992. He then married Hernawati in 1992 and had two children. Hernawati died in 2005 and Rampan then married Hermiyana, who is Hernawati's sister, and had one child with her.

== Literary career ==
In 1976 Rampan's novel Upacara received second place in the Jakarta Arts Council Novel Competition. Published by Pustaka Jaya two years later, the novel focuses on the rituals of a Dayak tribe in the hinterlands of Kalimantan and how they affect the life of the main character. The novel was translated into English by George A. Fowler and published by the Lontar Foundation as Ceremony in 2014.

Rampan worked as editor for Cypress Publishing between 1978 and 1980, then for the daily Sinar Harapan between 1980 and 1982, when he began working as editor of the magazine Sarinah.

During this time he lived in the national capital, Jakarta, occasionally serving as a broadcaster for RRI and TVRI. He also established the Arus Foundation to publish works related to literature. Rampan's poetry collection for children, Cuaca di atas Gunung dan Lembah ('The Weather above the Mountains and Valleys') won a prize from best poetry collection from the Buku Utama foundation in 1984.

After 2001 Rampan led the Sentawar Pos, a daily newspaper published in Barong Tongkok, West Kutai Regency. He also taught at Sendawar University in Melak, West Kutai.

Rampan served on the election commission for West Kutai during the 2004 election, but resigned when he ran for the regency's Regional People's Representatives Council. He served from 2004 to 2009, spending time as the head of Commission I. During this time he remained a journalist, and would often travel between Jakarta and West Kutai for work.

By 2009 Rampan had amassed a personal collection of approximately 25,000 books, predominantly those related to literature. The oldest of these are 19th-century works of Chinese Malay literature. The books are used in his efforts to document Indonesia's literature.

Rampan died on 19 November 2015 at the Rumah Sakit Islam in Jakarta. He had long been ill, and gone for treatment several times.

== Selected bibliography ==
Rampan wrote several hundred books, including fifty children's stories, and translated numerous works of fiction. The following bibliography is derived from those compiled by Eneste (1981, p. 50), Sugono (2009, p. 156), and Ministry of Education and Culture, Korrie Layun Rampan. A more detailed bibliography is available at Ministry of Education and Culture, Korrie Layun Rampan.

=== Novels ===
- Upacara (1978)
- Api Awan Asap (1999)
- Wanita di Jantung Jakarta (2000)
- Perawan (2000)
- Bunga (2002)
- Lingkaran Kabut (2002)
- Sendawar (serial; 2003)

=== Short story collections ===
- Kekasih (1981)
- Malam Putih (1983)
- Perjalanan Guru Sejarah (1983)
- Matahari Makin Memanjang (1986)
- Perhiasan Bumi (1986)
- Perhiasan Bulan (1988)
- Perhiasan Matahari (1989)
- Ratapan (1989)
- Tak Alang Kepalang (1993)

=== Poetry collections ===
- Putih! Putih! Putih! (1976; with Gunoto Saparie)
- Sawan (1978)
- Matahari Pingsan di Ubun-Ubun
- Alibi
- Cermin sang Waktu
- Mata dan Sawan

=== Academic books ===
- Puisi Indonesia Mutakhir: Sebuah Perkenalan (1980)
- Cerita Pendek Indonesia Mutakhir: Sebuah Pembicaraan (1982)
- Kesusastraan tanpa Kehadiran Sastra (1984)
- Jejak Langkah Sastra Indonesia (1986)

== Works cited ==
- Ceremony. WorldCat. OCLC 903479111.
- Eneste, Pamusuk, ed. (1981). Leksikon Kesusastraan Indonesia Modern [Lexicon of Modern Indonesian Literature] (in Indonesian). Jakarta: Gramedia. OCLC 8785600.
- Junianto, Beno (19 November 2015). "Sastrawan Korrie Layun Rampan Meninggal Dunia" [Man of Letters Korrie Layun Rampan Passes Away]. Viva.co.id (in Indonesian). Archived from the original on 19 November 2015.
- "Korrie Layun Rampan" (in Indonesian). Taman Ismail Marzuki. Archived from the original on 24 September 2015.
- "Korrie Layun Rampan" (in Indonesian). Ministry of Education and Culture. Archived from the original on 11 September 2015.
- Mahayana, Maman S.; Sofyan, Oyon; Dian, Achmad (1995). Ringkasan dan Ulasan Novel Indonesia Modern [Summaries and Commentary on Modern Indonesian Novels] (in Indonesian). Jakarta: Grasindo. ISBN 978-979-553-123-4.
- Rampan, Korrie Layun (2000). Leksikon Susastra Indonesia [Lexicon of Indonesian Literature]. Jakarta: Balai Pustaka. ISBN 978-979-666-358-3.
- Sugono, Dendy, ed. (2009). Ensiklopedia Sastra Indonesia Modern [Encyclopedia of Modern Indonesian Literature] (in Indonesian). Jakarta: Language Center, National Department of Education. ISBN 978-979-692-283-3.
