= Kuntowijoyo =

Indonesian writer

- Born: 18 September 1943; Bantul, Yogyakarta, Japanese East Indies
- Died: 22 February 2005 (aged 61); Yogyakarta, Indonesia
- Occupations: Author, historian
- Spouse: Susilaningsih
- Writing career
- Language: Indonesian
- Period: 1968–2005
- Genre: Literature
- Notable awards: S.E.A. Write Award (1999)

Kuntowijoyo (18 September 1943 – 22 February 2005) was an Indonesian writer and academic.

== Biography ==
Kuntowijoyo was born in Bantul, Yogyakarta, on 18 September 1943. His father was a dhalang and macapat reader, and his great-grandfather was a mushaf writer. When he attended elementary school at Ibtidaiyah Madrasah, he practiced declamation, storytelling, and reading the Koran. He was also mentored by literary figures M. Saribi Arifin and Yusmanan. A voracious reader, in middle school he read works by Indonesian authors such as Hamka, HB Jassin, and Pramoedya Ananta Toer; he graduated in 1959. while attending high school in Surakarta, he read works of world literature by Charles Dickens and Anton Chekov. While in high school, he wrote short stories, plays, essays, and novels. He graduated from high school in 1962.

During his college days at Gadjah Mada University, he founded the Lembaga Kebudayaan Seniman Islam (Islamic Artists Cultural Institution) and Studi Grup Mantika (together with Ikranagara, Arifin C. Noer, Dawam Rahardjo, Chaerul Umam, Amri Yahya, Sju'bah Asa and Abdul Hadi W. M.). In 1964, he published his first novel, Kereta Api yang Berangkat di Pagi Hari (The Train that Leaves Early in the Morning); it was picked up as a serial by the newspaper Djihad in 1966. The following year, in 1967, he published his first short story in the literary magazine Horison. In 1969, he graduated from UGM with a degree in history.

Kuntowijoyo then continued his education in the United States. He obtained his Master of Arts in American History from Connecticut University (1974) and Ph.D. in history from Columbia University (1980); his doctoral dissertation was titled "Social Change in an Agrarian Society: Madura 1850–1940". It was during his time in the United States that Kuntowijoyo began writing poetry, publishing two anthologies during this time: Suluk Awang-Uwung (1975) and Isyarat (Signs; 1976). Both dealt with his experiences while in the United States. On his return to Indonesia in 1980, he founded the Centre for Policy Research and Study with Amien Rais and Chairil Anwar. He was also active in various aspects of the Islamic organization Muhammadiyah, although he was critical of them; he wrote that they were a "cultural institution without culture".

After suffering from meningoencephalitis in 1991, Kuntowijoyo lost some motor control and found difficulty speaking. He began to write at an increased pace. For three years in a row, from 1995 to 1997, his short stories were chosen as the best stories published by the newspaper Kompas; stories selected were "Lelaki yang Kawin dengan Peri" ("The Man who Married a Fairy"; 1995), "Pistol Perdamaian" ("Pistol of Peace"; 1996), and "Anjing-anjing Menyerbu Kuburan" ("Dogs Attack a Graveyard"; 1997). In 1995 Kuntowijoyo published a third collection of poetry, entitled Makrifat Daun, Daun Makrifat (Faith in Leaves, Leaves of Faith), which dealt with his religious experiences. In 2001, Kompas published his novel Mantra Penjinak Ular (Mantra of the Snake Charmer) as a serial.

On 21 February 2005, Kuntowijoyo was taken to Sardjito Hospital complaining of diarrhea and difficulty breathing. He died the next day. He left behind two works after his death, Historical Experience (a handbook for students of history) and Sejarah Eropa Barat (History of West Europe); Sejarah Eropa Berat was published posthumously under the title Peran Borjuasi dalam Transformasi Eropa (Role of the Bourgeois in the Transformation of Europe; 2005). That same year, another of his short stories was selected as the best published in Kompas.

== Style and creative process ==
Kuntowijoyo's works, which include many aspects of Islam and Javanese culture, were influenced in part by his childhood. He said that many were based on his own experiences.

According to the foreword of his 1999 short story collection Hampir Sebuah Subversi (Almost a Subversion), Kuntowijoyo wrote without previous planning. In 2005, towards his death, he wrote that his creative process involved "writing from the inside" (writing about a fictional world as its characters see it) and "writing from the bottom" (writing without using a particular literary theory, but focusing on consistent portrayals of the characters).

== Personal life ==
Kuntowijoyo married Susilaningish in 1969. Together they had two children, Punang Amaripuja (in 2005 a lecturer at the Muhammadiyah University of Yogyakarta) and Alun Paradipta.

== Awards ==
When he was a student of literature faculty of UGM, he was awarded by Badan Pembina Teater Nasional Indonesia for Rumput-Rumput Danau Bento (1968) and by Sastra magazine for Dilarang Mencintai Bunga-Bunga (1968). Other awards include:

- Art Award from the Government of Yogyakarta (1986)
- Literary Writing Award from the Centre for Language Advocacy and Development for Dilarang Mencintai Bunga-Bunga (Don't Love Flowers; 1994)
- Culture Award from the Indonesian Association of Muslim Intellectuals (1995)
- Satyalencana Kebudayaan from the Government of Indonesia (1997)
- Mizan Award (1998)
- S.E.A. Write Award from the Government of Thailand (1999)

== Selected works ==
=== Prose ===
- Kereta Api yang Berangkat di Pagi Hari (The Train that Leaves Early in the Morning; 1964; novel)
- Pasar (Market; 1972; novel)
- Khotbah Atas Bukit (Sermon on the Hill; 1976; novel)
- Dilarang Mencintai Bunga-Bunga (Don't Love Flowers; 1992; collection of short stories)
- Hampir Sebuah Subversi (Almost a Subversion; 1999; collection of short stories)
- Mantra Penjinak Ular (Mantra of the Snake Charmer; 2000; novel)
- Wasripin dan Satinah (Wasripin and Satinah; 2003; novel)

=== Poetry ===
- Suluk Awang-Uwung (1975)
- Isyarat (Signs; 1976)
- Makrifat Daun, Daun Makrifat (Faith in Leaves, Leaves of Faith; 1995)

=== Dramas ===
- Rumput-Rumput Danau Bento (The Weeds of Lake Bento; 1968)
- Tidak Ada Waktu Bagi Nyonya Fatma, Barda, dan Cartas (There's No Time for Misses Fatma, Barda, and Cartas; 1972)
- Topeng Kayu (Wooden Mask; 1973)

=== Non-fiction ===
- Dinamika Sejarah Umat Islam (Dynamics of Muslim History; 1985)
- Budaya dan Masyarakat (Culture and Society; 1987)
- Paradigma Islam: Interpretasi untuk Aksi (Islamic Paradigms: Interpretations for Action; 1991)
- Demokrasi dan Budaya Birokrasi (Democracy and the Culture of Bureaucracy; 1994)
- Identitas Politik Umat Islam (Political Identities of Muslims; 1997)
- Pengantar Ilmu Sejarah (Introduction to History; 2001)
- Muslim Tanpa Masjid (Muslims Without a Mosque; 2001)
- Selamat Tinggal Mitos, Selamat Datang Realitas (Goodbye Myths, Hello Reality; 2002)
- Radikalisasi Petani: Esai-Esai Sejarah Kuntowijoyo (Radicalization of Farmers: Kuntowijoyo's Historical Essays; 2002)
- Raja, Priayi, dan Kawula: Surakarta 1900–1915 (Kings, Priyayi, and Kawula: Surakarta 1900–1915; 2004)
- Peran Bourjuasi dalam Transformasi Eropa (Role of the Bourgeois in the Transformation of Europe; 2005)

== Bibliography ==
- Anwar, Moh. Wan (2007). Kuntowijoyo: Karya dan Dunianya. Jakarta: Gramedia Widiasarana Indonesia. ISBN 978-979-759-613-2.
- Hwia, Ganjar (22 February 2006). "Obituari Kuntowijoyo (1943 – 2005)". Susastra: Jurnal Ilmu Sastra Dan Budaya. 2 (3). Yayasan Obor Indonesia. ISSN 0216-1591. OCLC 62870717.
- "Kuntowijoyo" (in Indonesian). Language Centre, Indonesian Ministry of Education.
- Mulkhan, Abdul Munir (24 February 2005). "Kuntowijoyo Sang Begawan" [Kuntowijoyo the Begawan]. Kompas (in Indonesian). Archived from the original on 16 October 2007.
- Rampan, Korrie Layun (2000). Leksikon Susastra Indonesia. Jakarta: Balai Pustaka. ISBN 978-979-666-358-3.
