= Al-Jamiatul Islamiah Azizul Uloom Babunagar =

Qawmi madrasah in Chittagong, Bangladesh

Coordinates: 22.6482°N 91.8085°E

- বাবুনগর মাদ্রাসা
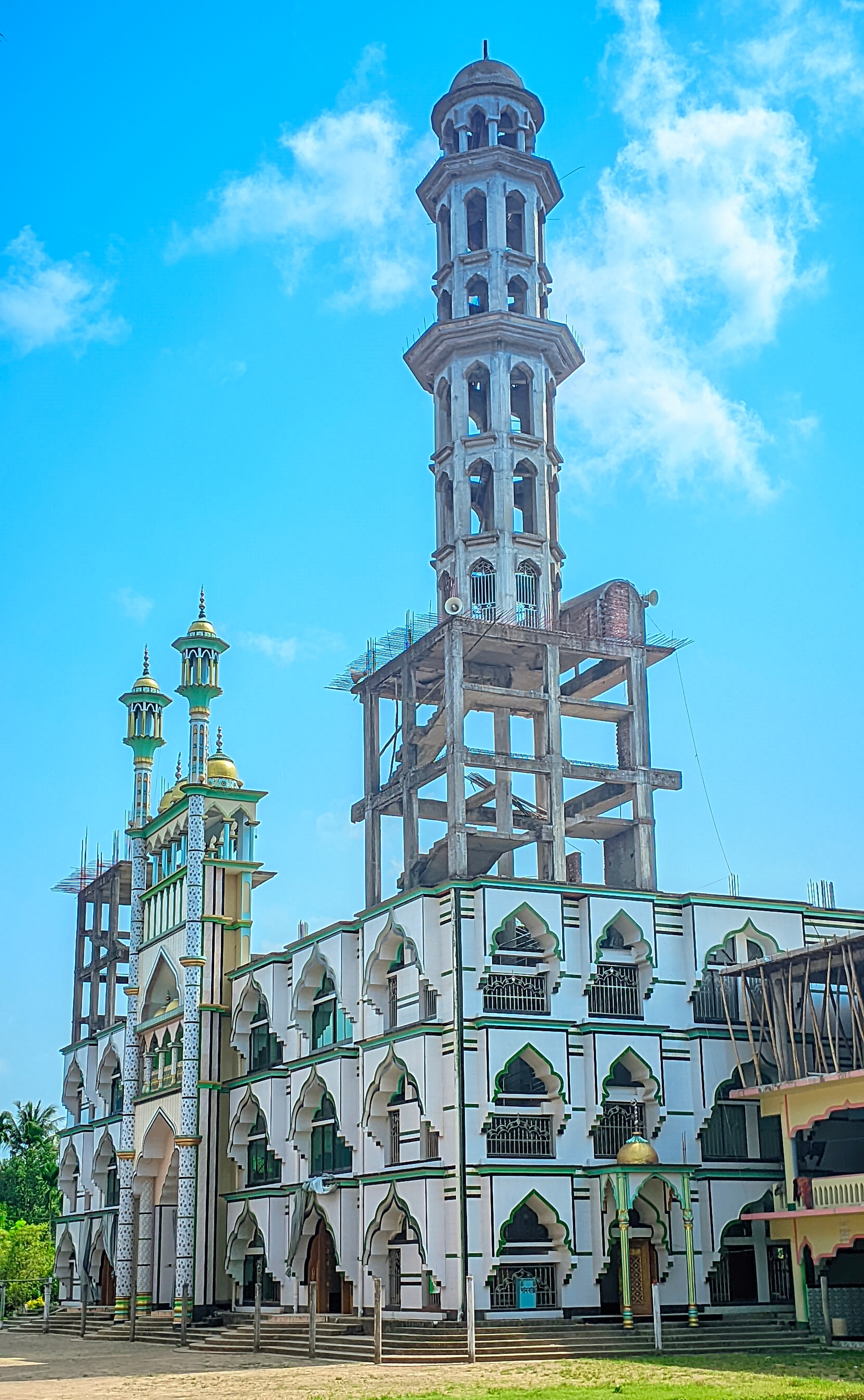
- Type: Islamic university
- Established: 1924
- Chancellor: Muhibbullah Babunagari
- Academic staff: 70 (Total)
- Students: Around 3000
- Location: Babunagar, Fatikchhari, Chittagong
- Campus: Rural
- Location in Bangladesh

Al-Jāmiʿah al-Islāmiyyah ʿAzīz al-ʿUlūm Bābūnagar (Arabic: الجامعة الإسلامية عزيز العلوم بابونغر), better known simply as Babunagar Madrasah (Bengali: বাবুনগর মাদ্রাসা), is one of the well-known Qawmi madrasahs in Chittagong. Established in 1924, situated at Babunagar, Fatikchhari, there are at present about 3000 students acquiring education.

== Education pattern ==
Al-Jamiatul Islamiah Azizul Uloom Babunagar being one of the oldest Jamiahs in Bangladesh offers the students Islamic education from the very initial stage up to the highest level. It also offers Specialization (Equivalent to Phd) in different subjects to the students who has successfully completed Takmil (MA).

== Notable alumni ==
- Allama Junaid Babunagari
- Abdus Salam Chatgami

== Notable faculty ==
- Sultan Ahmad Nanupuri
