= Abdus Salam Chatgami =

Bangladeshi Islamic scholar (1943–2021)

Grand Mufti Abdus Salam Chatgami

Personal details
- Born: 1943 Naldia, Chittagong, Bengal Presidency
- Died: 8 September 2021 (aged 77–78) Bangladesh
- Education: Jamia Uloom-ul-Islamia, Al-Jameatul Arabiatul Islamia Ziri
- Main interests: Hadith; Fiqh

Religious life
- Denomination: Sunni
- Jurisprudence: Hanafi
- Movement: Deobandi

Senior posting
- Disciple of: Abdul Qadir Raipuri; Sultan Ahmad Nanupuri
- Students: Hifzur Rahman

Abdus Salam Chatgami (1943 – 8 September 2021) was a Bangladeshi Islamic scholar, educator, writer, and researcher. He served as the Grand Mufti in both Pakistan and Bangladesh.

== Early life and education ==
Abdus Salam Chatgami was born in 1943, to a Bengali Muslim scholarly family in the village of Naldia in Anwara, Chittagong, Bengal Presidency. His genealogy is as follows: Shaykh Abdus Salam, son of Shaykh Khalilur Rahman, son of Shaykh Abdul Khaliq, son of Shaykh Raushan Ali.

== Education ==
His education initially began at his home in Naldia. He then joined the local madrasa in his village, Al-Madrasa al-Azizia Al-Qasimia, in 1367 AH (1947-1948 CE) where he studied for three years. Chatgami then spent time earning with his father, Khalilur Rahman. In 1375 AH (1955-1956 CE), he enrolled at the Ihyaul Uloom al-Husaynia in the nearby village of Boalia where he was educated for three years. Chatgami then progressed onto Al-Jamiatul Islamiah Azizul Uloom Babunagar where he spent four years. In 1967, he completed Dawra-e Hadith degree from Jamia Islamia Jiri. Among his teachers in Bengal were Abdul Wadud Sandwipi, Mufti Nurul Haq Chatgami, Grand Mufti Ahmadul Haq, Harun Babunagari, Muhammad Yunus, Ali Ahmad Boalvi, Nurul Islam al-Jadid, Ahmad Husayn of Burumchhara, Muhammad Ismail of Naldia, Mawlana Abdus Subhan, Mawlana Muhammad Ali, Mawlana Ahmad Hasan, Mawlana Abdul Ghani, Mawlana Farrukh Ahmad, Qari Ahmadullah, Shaykh Abdul Jabbar, Kabir Ahmad Rauzani and Shaykh Salih Ahmad Chatgami.

In the same year, he moved to Karachi and was admitted in Jamia Uloom-ul-Islamia for two years and studied under Muhammad Yusuf Banuri. There he studied Hadith for the second time, and subsequently fiqh. Among his other teachers in Karachi were Allama Syed Hamid Miyan, Allama Idris Mirathi, Allama Fazl Muhammad Swati, Shaykh Badiuzzaman, Shaykh Muhammad Ishaq Sandelvi and Shaykh Syed Masabihullah Hazarvi. Chatgami received ijazat in Hadith from Rasul Khan Hazarvi, Zakariyya Kandhlawi, Muhammad Tayyib Qasmi, Shamsul Haq Afghani, Muhammad Idris Kandhlawi and Abdul Haq Haqqani.

== Career ==
After completing education at Jamia Uloom-ul-Islamia, he was appointed mufti in this seminary. Later he was promoted to Deputy Grand Mufti and later acting Grand Mufti. After the death of mufti Wali Hasan Tonki, he became Grand Mufti. Besides his duty as Grand Mufti, he was also a teacher of Hadith and Khatib of Ahmad Usmani Jame Mosque. In 2000, he returned to Bangladesh and joined the Hathazari Madrasa.

== Literary works ==
His books include:

- Zawahirul Fatwa
- Makalat-e Chatgami
- Problems during COVID-19 pandemic and its Shariah provisions
- Boalvi Rah in the heart-warming aroma Malfuzate
- Number of Vitr prayers and rak'ats
- Sacrifice rules and urgent matters
- Tawheed and Resalat in Ahkam
- Aapka Suwal Aur Unka Jawab Ahadish Ki Roushani Mein
- The Basic Principles of Islamic Mayshat
- Purchase and sale of human organs in the eyes of Islam and modern medical science
- Maqbool Doa of Rahmate Alam (Sa.)
- Murawaza Islamic Banker
- Hayate Shaykhul Kul
- Tajkera-e Mukhlis

== Death ==
Chatgami died on 8 September 2021. The same day a meeting was held by a committee to appoint the next director-general of Hathazari Madrasa. Prior to his death, the committee decided he be the next director-general.

== See also ==
- List of Deobandis
