= Islamic Research Center Bangladesh =

Research center in Dhaka, Bangladesh

Islamic Research Center Bashundhara, Bangladesh
- Type: Islamic research center
- Founders: Mufti Abdur Rahman (R'A)
- Chancellor: Faqihul Millat Mufti Abdur Rahman
- Location: Bashundhara, Dhaka; 23.8167°N 90.4326°E
- Campus: Urban

Islamic Research Center Bangladesh, popularly known as Bashundhara Islamic Research Center, is a higher Islamic research institution situated at Bashundhara, Dhaka. Faqihul Millat Mufti Abdur Rahman was the principal founder of the institution.

== Departments ==
At present, Islamic Research Center Bangladesh offers Islamic education in the following fields of Islamic studies.

- Department of Fatwa (Darul Ifta)
- Department of Higher Islamic Law and Fiqh
- Department of Dawra-e-Hadeeth
