= Iman Budhi Santosa =

Indonesian author (1948–2020)

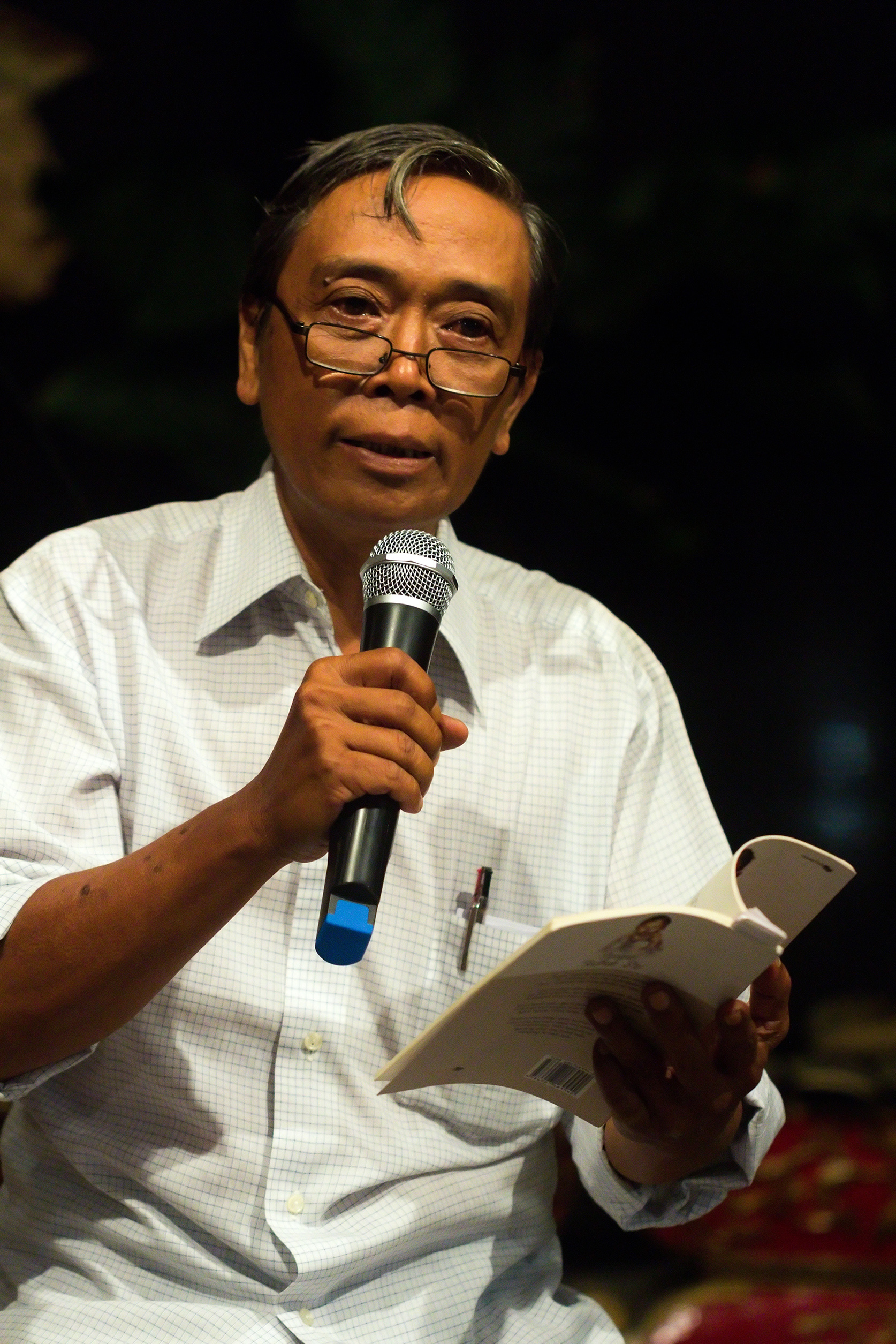
- Santosa at the launch of his book Sesanti Tedhak Siti in 2015
- Born: 28 March 1948; Kauman, Magetan, Dutch East Indies
- Died: 10 December 2020 (aged 72); Yogyakarta, Indonesia
- Education: Farming Academy, Semarang
- Occupation: Poet
- Spouse: Sri Maryati (1971–1978)
- Children: 4

Iman Budhi Santosa (28 March 1948 – 10 December 2020), commonly known as IBS, was an Indonesian author based in Yogyakarta. Born in Magetan, East Java, IBS was educated in agriculture but drawn to literature from a young age. In 1969, he helped establish the Persada Studi Klub, later publishing numerous works, including poetry collections, novels, and short stories. His poetry has been considered to have strong Javanese cultural influences.

== Early life and education ==
Iman Budhi Santosa was born on 28 March 1948, a Kliwon Sunday, the only child born to Iman Sukandar and Hartiyatim. The family lived in Kauman, Magetan, East Java, until IBS's parents divorced when he was aged 18 months. IBS went to live with his mother and grandfather in Magetan. He later described his childhood as an unhappy one, stating that his mother and grandfather – a former headmaster – had insisted that he focus on intellectual pursuits, rather than sports like the other children. As a result, he felt isolated from his peers.

IBS finished elementary school in 1960; around this time his mother remarried, taking the Javanese-language author Any Asmara as her husband. The family continued to live in Magetan until after IBS completed his junior high school education when they relocated to Yogyakarta. There he studied at the vocational school run by the Muja-Muju Agricultural Education Foundation, graduating in 1968.

== Career ==
On 5 March 1969, IBS established the Persada Studi Klub (PSK; Persada Study Club) together with fellow authors such as Umbu Landu Paranggi and Ragil Suwarna Pragolapati. Sponsored by the magazine Pelopor Yogya, this group allowed young authors to publish in a dedicated section of the weekly's culture column. Though the group disbanded in 1977, its shared passion for freedom and togetherness continued to influence IBS. In his poetry, IBS was further influenced by Javanese mysticism (kejawen), drawing on traditional Javanese culture such as wayang.

In 1971 IBS began to work at the Medini tea plantation on the slopes of Mount Ungaran. After four years there, he spent three months with the Cipiring sugar factory in Kendal before joining the Ministry of Agriculture. By the end of the 1970s he had been stationed in Pekalongan, Cilacap, and Boyolali. The ministry later sent him to the Farming Academy in Semarang, from which he graduated in 1983. During this period he published few works, though he continued to write actively. His works were included in such anthologies as Tugu (1986) and Tonggak 3, both edited by his PSK colleague Linus Suryadi AG.

In 1987, IBS left the Ministry of Agriculture to return to Yogyakarta and continue his literary career. Together with Emha Ainun Nadjib, he was quickly considered one of city's senior poets. In 1994, he won a poetry competition at the Cultural Center in Yogyakarta with his poem "Kemenangan Seorang Buruh Harian" ("A Day Labourer's Victory"). Two of his serials, Dorodasih and Pertiwi, received prizes from the magazine Femina in 1994 and 1995 respectively. In 1996 he published his collection Dunia Semata Wayang, which contained works written between 1969 and 1995.

IBS published Ziarah Tanah Jawa ("Pilgrimage to the Land of Java"), a collection of poems written between 2006 and 2012, in 2013. In his foreword to the poetry collection, he described it as an attempt to use poetry to present Javanese philosophy to a society which had begun to abandon it. The essayist Tia Setiadi, in a review of the collection, considered IBS to have conveyed much about Javanese spiritualism while at the same time implying that Javanese culture was dead, as the word ziarah invokes pilgrimages to graves. He noted that, in the collection, IBS does not refer to any Javanese philosophers by name, and argues that by doing so IBS implies that Javanese beliefs originated not from individuals, but from the Javanese people themselves.

In 2015 IBS published Sesanti Tedhak Siti, a collection of geguritan written since 1980. During the book's launch, he explained that the title was a reference to Tedhak Siti, a Javanese ritual that takes place the first time a child is placed on the ground. Through this reference, he meant to imply that the Javanese people must relearn their heritage.

== Death ==
After several years of heart issues, IBS died on 10 December 2020 at his boarding house in Yogyakarta from heart failure. He was buried at Giri Sapto Cemetery in Imogiri, Bantul.

== Personal life ==
IBS married Sri Maryati of Purworejo in September 1971. The couple had four children (Wisang Prangwadani, Pawang Surya Kencana, Risang Rahjati Prabowo, and Ratnasari Devi Kundari) before they separated in 1978.

== Selected bibliography ==
The following bibliography is derived from Santosa (2015b, pp. 59–60). Aside from the literary works listed here, IBS has also published textbooks on agriculture and Javanese culture. Several of his works have been compiled in anthologies.

- Tiga Bayangan (poetry anthology; 1970)
- Ranjang Tiga Bunga (novel; 1975)
- Barong Kertapati (novel; 1976)
- Dunia Semata Wayang (poetry; 1996)
- Kalimantang (short story collection; 2003)
- Matahari-Matahari Kecil (poetry; 2004)
- Perempuan Panggung (novel; 2007)
- Ziara Tanah Jawa (poetry; 2013)
- Sesanti Tedhak Siti (geguritan; 2015)

== Works cited ==
- "Iman Budi Santosa" (in Indonesian). Language Center. 6 May 2014. Archived from the original on 6 February 2015.
- Rampan, Korrie Layun (2000). Leksikon Susastra Indonesia [Lexicon of Indonesian Literature]. Jakarta: Balai Pustaka. ISBN 978-979-666-358-3.
- Salam, Aprinus (2004). Oposisi Sastra Sufi [Opposition of Sufi Literature] (in Indonesian). Yogyakarta: LKiS. ISBN 978-979-3381-64-0.
- Santosa, Iman Budhi (2015a). Ziarah Tanah Jawa [Pilgrimage to the Land of Java] (in Indonesian). Yogyakarta: Interlude. ISBN 978-602-71899-1-1.
- Santosa, Iman Budhi (2015b). Sesanti Tedhak Siti (in Javanese). Yogyakarta: Interlude. ISBN 978-602-71899-8-0.
- Setiadi, Tia (July 2013). "Jawa, Juggernaut, dan Alam Sebagai Tembang: Tentang Ziarah Tanah Jawa, Karya Iman Budhi Santosa" [Java, Juggernauts, and Nature as Songs: About Iman Budhi Santosa's Ziarah Tanah Jawa]. Poetika. I (1): 96–106. ISSN 2338-5383.
- Santoso, Joko (2013). "Dudu Sanak Dudu Kadang Yen Mati Melu Kelangan" [Sometimes We Know Not if Death Follows Loss]. In Suharmono; Anis Mashlihatin (eds.). Dialog: Setahun Diskusi Puisi [Dialogue: A Year of Poetry Discussions] (in Indonesian). Yogyakarta: Gress Publishing. pp. 35–41. ISBN 978-602-96825-2-6.
- Sujatmiko, Tomi (1 June 2015). "Harus Kembali Belajar Jadi Orang Jawa" [Must Relearn How to Be Javanese]. Kedaulatan Rakyat (in Indonesian). p. 1. Archived from the original on 11 August 2015.
- Wawan S., Jauh Hari (10 December 2020). "Sastrawan Iman Budhi Santosa Tutup Usia" [Auteur Iman Budhi Santosa Passes]. Detik.com (in Indonesian).
