= Azizul Haque (scholar, born 1903) =

Islamic scholar and social reformer

Qutub-e-Zaman Mufti Azizul Haque

Chancellor, Al Jamia Al Islamia Patiya
- In office 1938–1961
- Succeeded by: Muhammad Yunus

Personal life
- Born: 1903 Charkanai, Patiya, Chittagong District
- Died: 3 March 1961 (aged 57–58)
- Resting place: Maqbara-e-Aziz, Jamia Patiya
- Children: Mawlana Ismail
- Parent: Mawlana Nur Ahmad (father)
- Era: 20th-century
- Notable work: Anjuman-e-Ittihadul Madaris Bangladesh
- Education: Darul Uloom Deoband; Mazahir Uloom al-Jamiah al-Arabiyyah al-Islamiyyah Jiri

Religious life
- Religion: Islam
- Denomination: Sunni
- Jurisprudence: Hanafi
- Movement: Deobandi

Muslim leader
- Disciple of: Zamiruddin Ahmad
- Disciples: Abul Hasan Jashori Sultan Ahmad Nanupuri
- Students: Harun Islamabadi
- Influenced by: Ashraf Ali Thanwi, Shah Ahmad Hasan
- Influenced: Muhammad Yunus Harun Islamabadi Mufti Abdur Rahman Harun Babunagari

Azizul Haque (Bengali: আজিজুল হক; 1903 — 1961) was an Islamic scholar and social reformer from present-day Bangladesh. He was the founder of Al-Jamiah al-Islamiyyah Patiya and served as its first chancellor.

== Early life and education ==
Azizul Haque was born in 1903, to a Bengali Muslim family of Munshis in Charkanai, Patiya of the Bengal Presidency's Chittagong District. He lost his father, Mawlānā Nur Ahmad, at the age of eleven months. Haq also lost his mother when he turned eleven years old. From then on, he was raised by his paternal grandfather, Munshi Surat Ali.

In 1914, his grandfather took him to Al-Jamiah al-Arabiyyah al-Islamiyyah Jiri where he entrusted him under the supervision of its director Shah Ahmad Hasan.

On the same year in which Haq completed Meshkat, Hasan declared that the madrasa shall be establishing a Hadith department the following year. In 1924, Haq completed his Hadith studies at Jiri and set off for Hindustan for further education. He studied in Darul Uloom Deoband and Mazahir Uloom, both in Saharanpur district. He returned to Bengal after spending nine months under Ashraf Ali Thanwi.

== Career ==
Haq returned to Jiri, serving as the madrasa's mufti and mufassir (scholar of Quranic exegesis) from 1927 to 1940. With the patronage of his teacher Zamiruddin Ahmad, Haq established a madrasa named Zamiria Qasimul Uloom in 1938. It later came to be known as al-Jamia al-Islamiyyah Patiya and was upgraded into an Islamic university. He spent the rest of his life as the chancellor of this madrasa.

== Personal life ==
During his time as teacher at the Jiri Madrasa, Haq married the daughter of Badiur Rahman Saudagar of Harinkhain (West Patiya). In this marriage, they had three sons and four daughters.

== Death ==
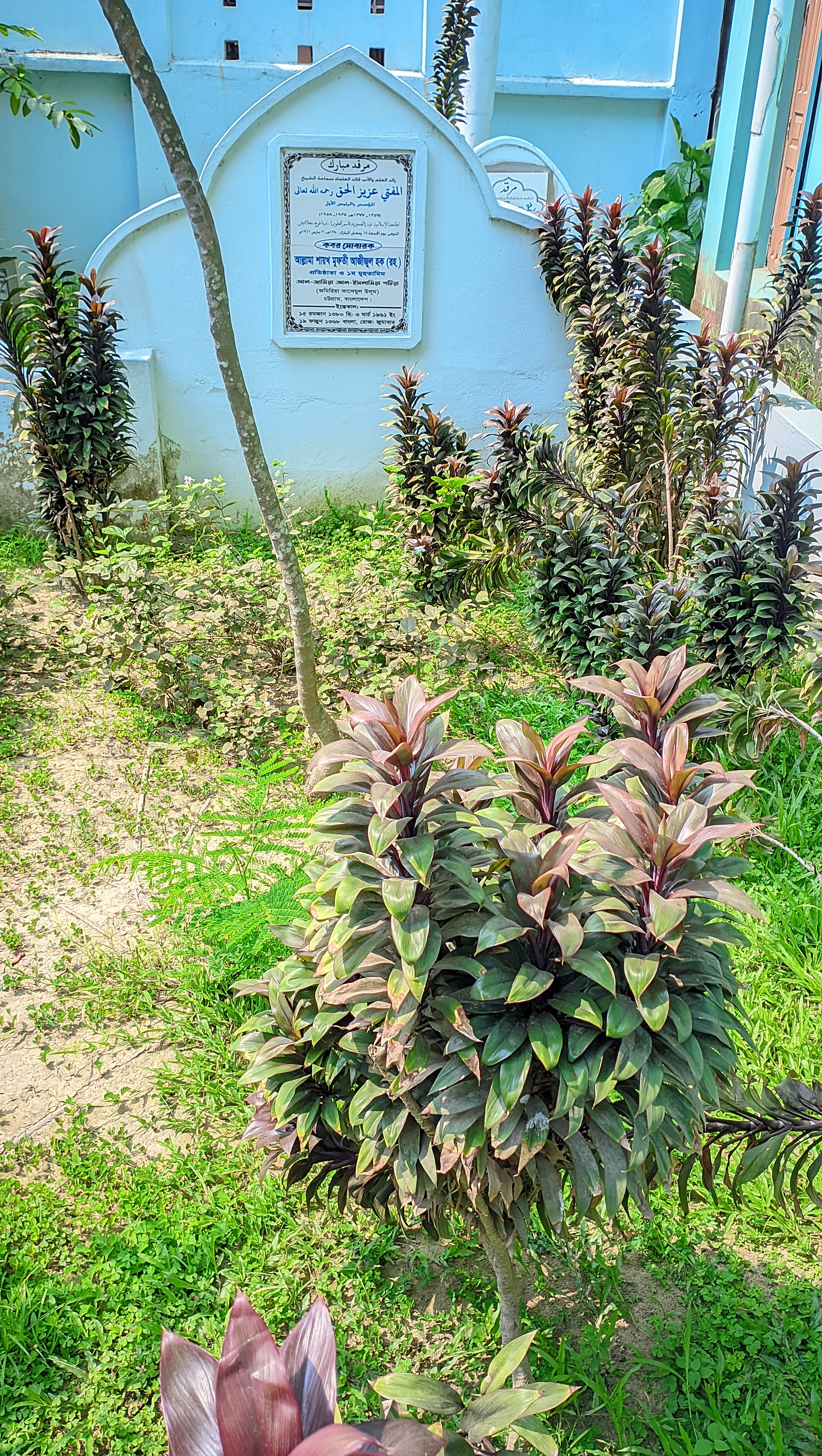
Maqbara-e-Azizi

Haq died just before the Friday prayer of 3 March 1961, at the age of 63. His janaza (funeral prayer) was performed by the Abdul Karim Madani (Imam of Anderkilla Shahi Jame Mosque) at the Jamia Patiya ground. Haq was subsequently buried in the madrasa graveyard, which is now known as Maqbara-e-Azizi.

== See more ==
- List of Deobandis
