= Jamia Islamia Obaidia Nanupur =

Coordinates: 22.6262°N 91.8415°E

- Nanupur Obaidia Madrasah
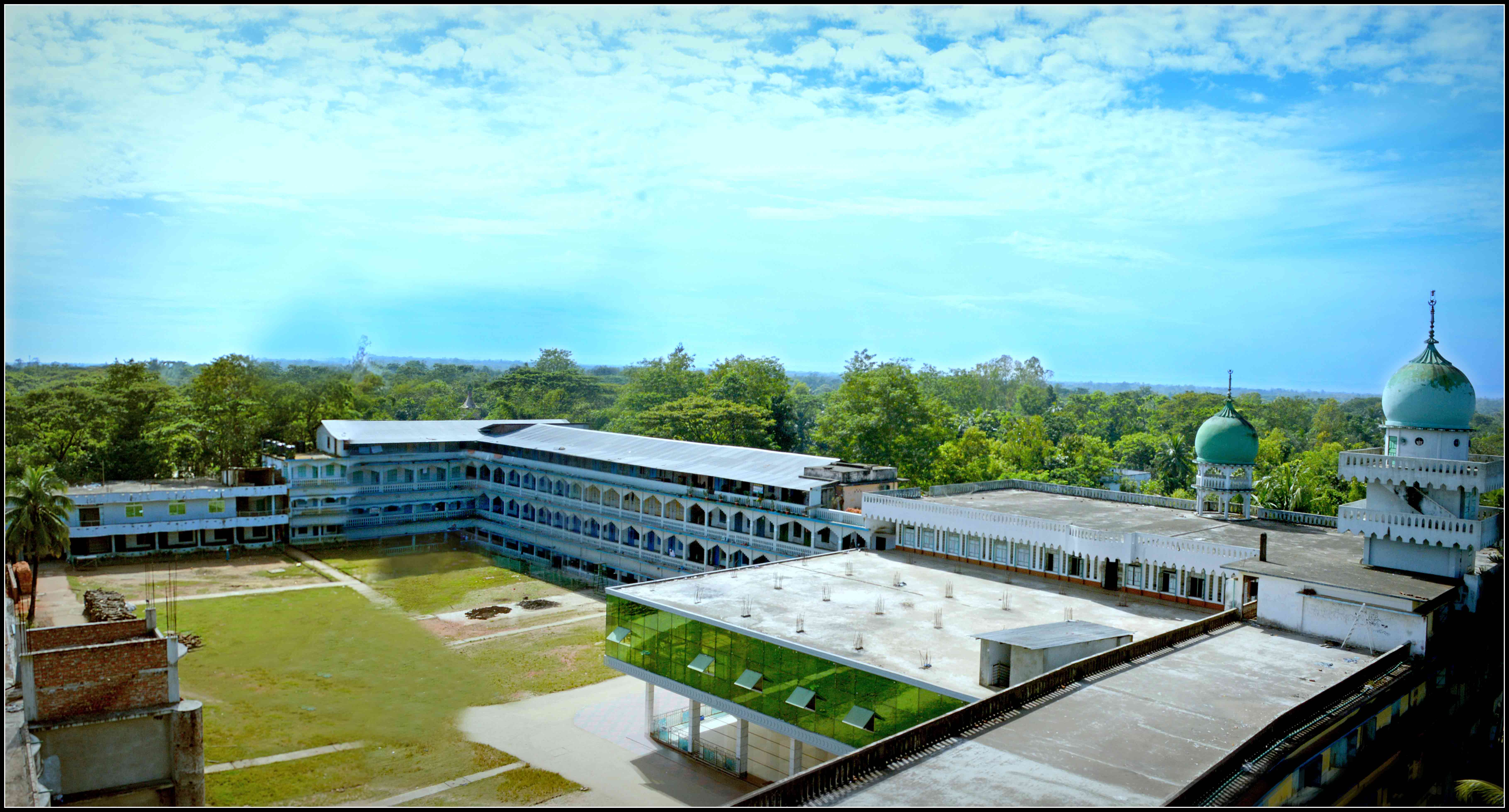
- Type: Islamic university
- Established: 1957 (1377 Hijri)
- Chancellor: Salah Uddin Nanupuri
- Students: 9000 (as of 2026)
- Location: Nanupur, Fatikchhari, Chittagong
- Campus: Rural
- Website: www.jamiaislamiaobaidia.com

Jamia Islamia Obaidia Nanupur (Arabic: الجامعة الإسلامية العبيدية نانوفور), popularly known as Nanupur Madrasah (Bengali: নানুপুর মাদ্রাসা), is a famous Qawmi Jamiah. The Jamiah was founded Allama Amir Uddin then established by Sultan Ahmed Nanupuri in 1958. It is situated at Nanupur, Fatikchhari, Bangladesh. There are 9000 students at present in the Jamiah receiving education in various subjects and 135 well qualified teachers.

== Education levels and departments ==
Currently the Jamiah has the following education levels and departments:

- Ibtedayi or Primary Stage: Here the students are taught basic knowledge of languages along with elementary Islamic knowledge. They are also taught how to recite the Qur'an in this stage.
- Hifzul Qur'an (Memorization of the Qur'an): Students are taught how to memorize the Qur'an with Tajweed (pronunciation).
- Alim or Graduation Course: Nahu-Sarf; Siraat-un-Nabi; Fiqh; Usul al-Fiqh; Arabic Grammar; Arabic literature; logics; Hadith; Tafsir; Islam history; and Persian poetry.
- Dawra or Post graduate level: Six major Hadith Books: Bukhari Sharif, Muslim Sharif, Abu Dawd Sharif, Tirmidi Sharif, Nasaee Sharif and Ibn Majah are mainly taught.
- Specialization (Beyond post graduate level):

Department of Tafsir (Interpretation of the glorious Qur'an)
Department of Tajweed (Pronunciation) and Qirat
Department of Fatwa (Dar al-Ifta)
Department of Hadith (Takassus fil Hadith)
Department of Fiqh (Islamic Jurisprudence)
Department of Arabic Literature

- Department of Mutafarrika (Short Course): This department is specially designed for those who have graduated from some universities or colleges and then want to study Islamic knowledge.
- Department of Publication: The Jamiah publishes its monthly magazine, academic calendar etc. under this department.

Besides these the Jamiah offers the students modern education in various subjects like Bengali, English, mathematics, hand-writing training and professional computer training.
