= Obaidullah Hamzah =

Bangladeshi Islamic scholar

Allama Obaidullah Hamzah
- ওবায়দুল্লাহ হামযাহ
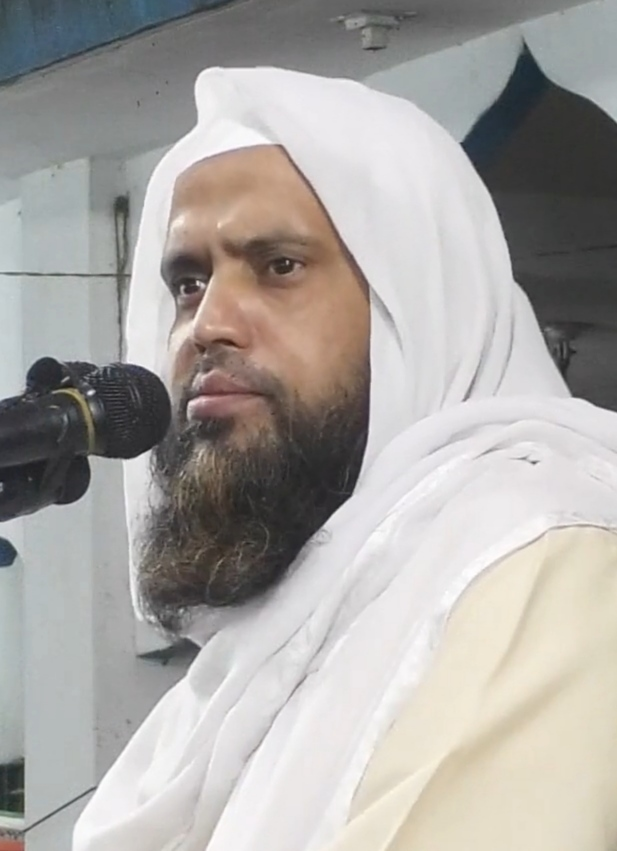
- Hamzah in 2022

6th Chancellor of Al Jamia Al Islamia Patiya
- Incumbent
- Assumed office 7 July 2022
- Preceded by: Abdul Halim Bukhari

Secretary-General of Bangladesh Tahfizul Quran Organisation
- Incumbent
- Assumed office 13 August 2019
- Preceded by: Rahmatullah Kawthar Nizami

Personal details
- Born: 1972 (age 53–54) Ukhia, Cox's Bazar, Bangladesh
- Education: Al Jamia Al Islamia Patiya

Personal life
- Parent: Amir Hamzah (father)
- Main interests: Islamic economics; Literature
- Notable works: Charity in Islam : Benefits and Excellences; Human Dignity and Dead Body Management in Islam

Religious life
- Religion: Islam
- Denomination: Sunni
- Jurisprudence: Hanafi
- Movement: Deobandi

Muslim leader
- Disciple of: Zulfiqar Ahmad Naqshbandi
- Influenced by: Abdul Halim Bukhari

Obaidullah Hamzah (Bengali: ওবায়দুল্লাহ হামযাহ; born 1972) is a Bangladeshi Islamic scholar, educator and economist. He is the sixth Director-General of Al Jamia Al Islamia Patiya and the head of its Arabic department. He is also the secretary-general of Anjuman-e-Ittihadul Madaris Bangladesh and Bangladesh Tahfizul Quran Organisation, chairman of the sharia supervisory committee of Islami Bank Bangladesh Ltd and Social Islami Bank Limited, the chief editor of the Bengali monthly At-Tawhid and the chief editor of Arabic magazine Balagh ash-Sharq.

== Early life and education ==
Hamzah was born in 1972, to a Bengali Muslim family in the village of Digalia-Palang in Ukhia, Cox's Bazar, Bangladesh. His father's name was Amir Hamzah. Hamzah completed his initial education at the Digalia-Palang Qasimul Uloom Madrasa before proceeding to study at Al Jamia Al Islamia Patiya where he completed his master's in Hadith studies. He received first class at the central examinations from the Anjuman-e-Ittehad al-Madaris examination board. In 1992, he gained first class from the Hadith exams by Befaqul Madarisil Arabia. The following year, he completed his studies of Bengali literature and research department from the Patiya madrasa.

== Career ==
After completing his education, Hamzah started his career as a teacher of Hadith at the Dar as-Sunnah Madrasa in Cox's Bazar. Between 1994 and 2000, Hamzah was employed as a teacher and translator under the Saudi ministries of religious affairs and defence. In 2001, he became a teacher at Al Jamia Al Islamia Patiya. From 2003 to 2005, he was the host of an Islamic radio programme in South Africa. In 2008, he took participated in the International Islamic Conference for Dialogue held in Mecca. Hamzah toured Thailand in 2012, where he gave speeches in 30 different colleges, Islamic institutions, radio stations and Thai Muslim TV. In 2013, Hamzah took part in an International Humanities Law Course in Beirut, Lebanon which was a part of a joint venture by the Arab League and International Red Cross and Red Crescent Movement. He became a member of the Social Islami Bank's sharia board in 2013. Hamzah has also held the role of khatib at the Halishahar A-Block Central Mosque. After the death of Rahmatullah Kawthar Nizami on 13 August 2019, Hamzah was elected as the next secretary-general of the Bangladesh Tahfizul Quran Organisation. During a shura at Al Jamia Al Islamia Patiya on 25 August 2020, Hamzah was appointed as the assistant-director of the madrasa. After Abdul Halim Bukhari's death in 2022, Hamzah was nominated as the acting director-general, and subsequently the director-general on 7 July 2022.

== Honours ==
- On 22 August 2018, the Muslim World League published a work on kindness and benevolence in Islam. Articles written by Islamic scholars from 64 countries were accepted, and from that, 8 articles were nominated to be a part of the official publication. Among the 8 published articles, the article presented in the first session was written by Obaidullah Hamzah. Hamzah was awarded in the conference and invited to Hajj.

== Publications ==
Hamzah is the chief editor of the Arabic magazine Balagh ash-Sharq and the chief editor of the Bengali monthly magazine At-Tawhid. Among his written and edited books are:

English

1. Charity in Islam: Benefits and Excellences.
2. Human Dignity and Dead Body Management in Islam

Bengali

1. Quran and Modern Science (Bengali: কুরআন ও আধুনিক বিজ্ঞান)
2. Endangered Women (Bengali: বিপন্ন নারী)
3. Islam vs. Terrorism (Bengali: ইসলাম বনাম সন্ত্রাসবাদ)
4. Muslim world exposed to the naked touch of Christianity (Bengali: খ্রিস্টবাদের নগ্ন ছোবলে আক্রান্ত মুসলিম বিশ্ব)
5. Guide of Islam in child rearing (Bengali: সন্তান প্রতিপালনে ইসলামের দিক নির্দেশনা)
6. Love of Prophet vs. Insult (Bengali: রাসূল সা . এর ভালবাসা বনাম অবমাননা)
7. Business vs. Interest: Perspectives on the Muslim World (Bengali: ব্যবসা বনাম সুদ: প্রেক্ষিত মুসলিম বিশ্ব)
8. Terrorism: Causes and Remedies (Bengali: সন্ত্রাসবাদ: কারণ ও প্রতিকার)
9. Human rights: Contribution of Prophet Mohammad pbuh. (Bengali: মানবাধিকার প্রতিষ্ঠায় মহানবী সা . এর অবদান)
10. Our Youth: Context Facebook (Bengali: আমাদের তারুণ্য: প্রসঙ্গ ফেইসবুক)
11. Poverty is a Danger, the Road to Zakat Free (Bengali: দারিদ্র্যতা একটি বিপদ, যাকাত মুক্তির রাজপথ)
12. Yaba's terrible paw: Target Bangladesh (Bengali: ইয়াবার ভয়াল থাবা: টার্গেট বাংলাদেশ)
13. Dignity and rights of the Prophet (peace be upon him) in the light of the Qur'an (Bengali: কুরআনের আলােকে রাসুল ( সা . )’র মর্যাদা ও অধিকার)
14. Women: Come back in the shadow of hijab (Bengali: নারী: হিজাবের ছায়ায় ফিরে এসাে)
15. Dignity of knowledge and contribution of Ulema-e Deoband (Bengali: ইলমের মর্যাদা ও উলামায়ে দেওবন্দের অবদান)
16. Islamic Culture vs. Subculture (Bengali: ইসলামী সংস্কৃতি বনাম অপসংস্কৃতি)

== See also ==
- List of Deobandis
