= Abdur Rahman (scholar) =

Bangladeshi Islamic scholar (1920–2015)

Mufti Abdur Rahman
- আব্দুর রহমান

Personal life
- Born: 1920 Imam Nagar, Fatikchhari, Chittagong District, Bengal Presidency, British India
- Died: 10 November 2015 (aged 94–95) Dhaka, Bangladesh
- Region: Bangladesh
- Main interest(s): Islamic economics, Hadith, Islamic jurisprudence

Religious life
- Religion: Islam
- Denomination: Sunni
- Jurisprudence: Hanafi
- Movement: Deobandi

Muslim leader
- Teacher: Sultan Ahmad Nanupuri
- Disciple of: Abrarul Haq Haqqi
- Students: Abu Taher Nadwi
- Influenced by: Azizul Haq

Abdur Rahman (Bengali: আব্দুর রহমান চাটগামী; 1920–2015), also known as Faqihul Millat, was a Bangladeshi Islamic scholar of the Deobandi school. He was born in Imam Nagar, Fatikchhari, Chittagong, in 1920. He was the founder director of the Islamic Research Center Bangladesh, Dhaka.

== Early life and education ==
Abdur Rahman was born in 1920, to a Bengali Muslim family in the village of Imamnagar in Fatikchhari, Chittagong District, British India. His father was known as Chan Miah. Abdur Rahman completed his primary and higher secondary education from Al Jamiatul Arabia Nasirul Islam and Darul Uloom Muinul Islam Hathazari. Then he went to Darul Uloom Deoband for further studies. There Abdur Rahman successfully completed Dawra e Hadith and then engaged himself at the same institution in research in the field of Ifta (Islamic jurisprudence).

== Career ==
After graduating from Darul Uloom Deoband Abdur Rahman served as a teacher and principal in various Islamic seminaries, locally called madrasah including Al-Jamiah Al-Islamiah Patiya of Chittagong and Jameel Madrasah of Bogra. He is the founder of Islamic Research Center Bangladesh and Jamiatul Abrarat Riverview, Dhaka. He is also the chairman of Bangladesh Qawmi Madrasah Education Board Federation. Besides these Mufti Abdur Rahman has been serving as the chairman of the North Bengal Madrasah Education Board consists of over a thousand institutions of Islamic education of 18 districts in the northern part of the country.

=== Islamic banking ===
From 1983 to 1992 Mufti Abdur Rahman was a member of the 1st Shariah Council of Islami Bank Bangladesh Ltd. Since then, he played an important role in the Islamic banking sector as shariah supervisor in various banks of the country. He was elected Chairman of the Central Shariah Board for Islamic Banks of Bangladesh (CSBIB) in 2007. In the meantime, worked as chairman of the Shariah Council of Al Arafah Islami Bank and as vice chairman of the Shariah Board of Social Investment Bank. He was also Shariah adviser of the Oriental Bank for a short period of time. He also serves as the Chairman of Shariah Board of Shahjalal Islami Bank. Abdur Rahman participated in different seminars and traveled to Saudi Arabia, UAE, Bahrain, Qatar, India and Pakistan.

== Death ==
He died of old age on 10 November 2015 in Bashundhara, Dhaka. The chairman of Bashundhara Group, Ahmed Akbar Sobhan expressed condolences.

== See also ==
- List of Deobandis
