= Ragil Suwarna Pragolapati =

Indonesian writer

Ragin Suwarna Pragolapati (born in Pati, 22 January 1948 - disappeared in Parangtritis, Yogyakarta, on 15 October 1990) is an Indonesian writer. He also known as a documenter of literature that persistent, diligent, and dedicated.

Together with Yogyakarta-based writers such as Umbu Landu Paranggi and Iman Budhi Santosa, he helped establish the Persada Studi Klub (PSK) in Yogyakarta.
