= Wall magazine =

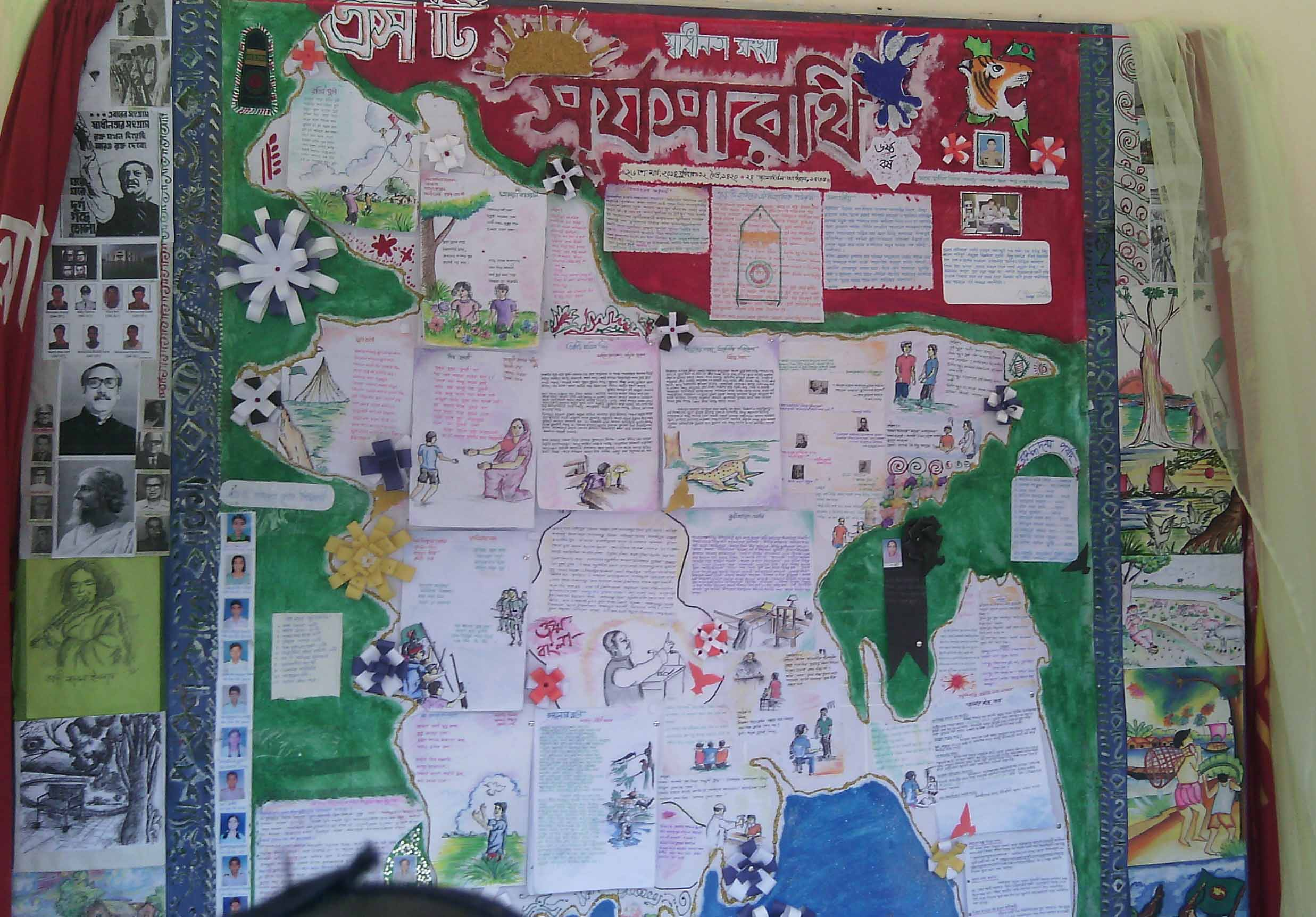
A wall magazine (in Bengali Deyalika) in Bangladesh

A wall magazine is a periodical run on a notice board, especially in an educational institute where the students and other members of the institution can post their articles, poems, drawings and other such compositions to share with each other. It is a common practice in parts of India, Bangladesh, and Indonesia. They can be in the form of themed collage with a specific message.

Wall magazines are a medium within the educational institutions for the students to express their creativity. It can also be utilized as a medium to increase interaction between students by having regular fortnight quizzes for others to participate in. Chosen topics can be discussed by regular posts on an open section of the wall magazine. It is an educational and creative way to express messages, history etc. In some educational institutions, like colleges, departments will have a wall magazine curated by students in that department.

Wall magazines are often used as tools for learning outside the classroom. Some educators have detailed how they use wall magazines in primary school classrooms alongside their curriculum. In one case study in the Anand Niketan Democratic School students were encouraged to explore their ideas about freedom beyond the context provided in their textbooks. Students made original connections and wrote original poetry to add to the wall magazine. Wall magazines have also been used in Indonesia as a way to make literacy more accessible in rural schools.

== See also ==
- School Magazine
- College Magazine
