= Al Jamia Al Islamia Patiya =

Qawmi madrasa in Bangladesh

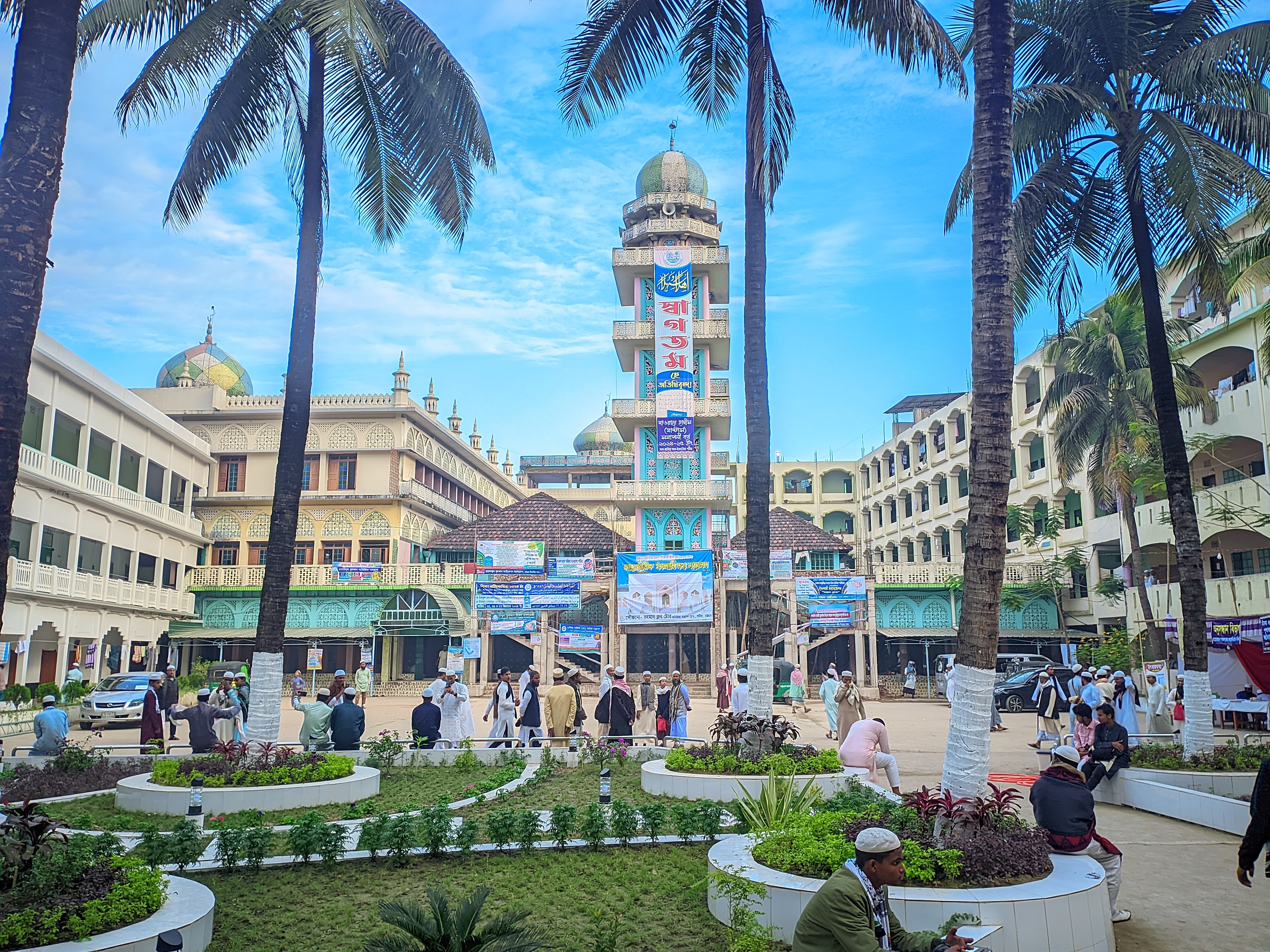
- Type: Qawmi Madrasah
- Established: 1938; 88 years ago
- Founder: Azizul Haq
- Chancellor: Akram Hussain Odudi
- Faculty: 160
- Students: 5,000 (total)
- Location: Patiya, Chittagong, Bangladesh; 22.2962°N 91.9829°E
- Campus: Urban
- Website: jamiahislamiahpatiya.com

Al-Jāmiʿah Al-Islāmiyyah Patiya (Arabic: الجامعة الإسلامية فتية, Bengali: আল জামিয়া আল ইসলামিয়া পটিয়া), better known simply as Patiya Madrasa (Bengali: পটিয়া মাদ্রাসা) and formerly known as Al-Madrasah Aḍ-Ḍamīriyyah Qāsim al-ʿUlūm (Arabic: المدرسة الضميرية قاسم العلوم, Bengali: জমিরিয়া কাসেমুল উলূম), is a Qawmi Madrasah located in Patiya Upazila of Chittagong District, Bangladesh. It was established in 1938 by Azizul Haq under the direction of Zamiruddin Ahmad. It is also known as an International Islamic University. It has a role in the promotion of Islam in Bangladesh, inclusion of Qawmi Madrasas under one syllabus, providing modern and higher education for scholars.

== History ==
With the patronage of his teacher Zamiruddin Ahmad, Mufti Azizul Haq established a madrasa named Zamiria Qasimul Uloom in 1938. It later came to be known as al-Jamia al-Islamiyyah Patiya and was upgraded into an Islamic university. Azizul Haq spent the rest of his life as the chancellor of this madrasa.

On 27 March 1971, Major-General Ziaur Rahman, the commander of the East Bengal Regiment in Chittagong and later President of Bangladesh, went to the Free Bengal Radio Centre in Kalurghat and proclaimed Bangladeshi independence from Pakistan. This led to violent unrest and the start of the Bangladesh War of Independence. In search of safety, Ziaur Rahman and his associates took their equipment and headed for the Patiya Madrasah where they spent the night in the guesthouse.

== Education pattern ==
The Jāmiʿah has currently these departments of education and classes: Dept. Of Nooranee (kindergarten), Dept. of Nazira and Hifz, and classes from elementary level to the Dawra-e-Hadith (M.A. Class).

- Post-graduate classes
- Short course curricula
- Vocational training and other courses
- Other training and Hifz competition

Al-Jamiah Al-Islamiah is one of the three large madrassahs, along with Darul Uloom Muinul in Hathazari and Jamiatul Uloom Al-Islamia Lalkhan Bazar, that together control over 7000 smaller schools in Bangladesh. The three schools are closely coordinated. This madrasa founded the Anjuman-e-Ittihad al-Madaris (Association of the Unity of Madrasas), an examination board which is adopted by many other madrasas in the south. They publish examinations annually for 6 class groups.

Subordinate madrasas include the Faiziyyah Tajwid al-Quran Madrasa in Hathazari, the Islamic Education Centre and Clinic in Bandarban (est. 1989), the Islamic Missionary Centre and Clinic in Sukhbilas Rangunia, and the Qasimul Uloom Jamil Madrasah in Bogra (est. 1960) which is the largest madrasa in North Bengal.

== Departments ==
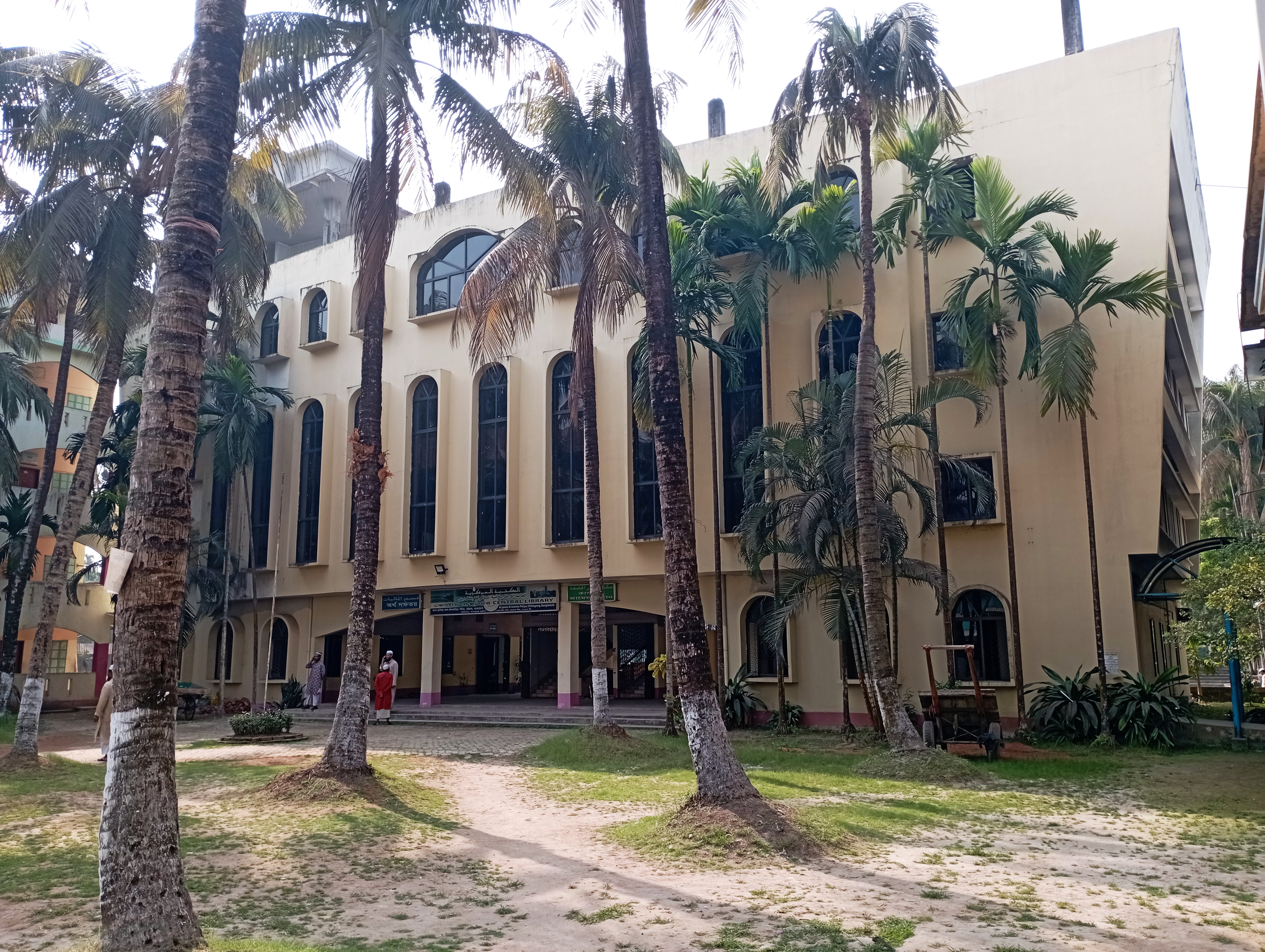
Central Library

=== Specialised ===
1. Dar al-Ifta, the fatwa department which teaches higher-level fiqh
2. Department of Tafsir, teaching Quranic exegesis
3. Department of Ulum-e-Hadith
4. Department of Qiraʼat, teaches Tajweed and the 7 modes of recitation
5. Department of Bengali literature, teaches Bengali and English literature. Founded in 1965 CE, it is the first Qawmi Madrasah to have such a department.
6. Department of Arabic literature

=== Short Course Department ===
Provides SSC in general Bangladeshi education syllabus.

== Publications ==
The monthly Al-Tawheed magazine has been published in Bengali by this Jamiah regularly for 43 years, and there is also the Al-Aziz Bengali magazine. The Arabic magazines published by the Jamiah is Balagh as-Sharq (every three months) and Ad-Dairah.

== Notable alumni ==
- Harun Islamabadi
- A F M Khalid Hossain
- Abdul Malek Halim
- Obaidullah Hamzah
- Abu Taher Misbah
- Nurul Amin

== See also ==
- List of Deobandi universities
- List of Qawmi Madrasas in Bangladesh
