= List of Deobandi organisations =

This list includes Deobandi and pro-Deobandi organisations.

#	Name	Established	Founder	Country	Type	Status	Reference
1	Samratut Tarbiat	1878	Mahmud Hasan Deobandi	British India	Political	Inactive	
2	Jamiatul Ansar	1909	Mahmud Hasan Deobandi	British India	Political	Inactive	
3	Nazaratul Maarif Al Qurania	1913	Mahmud Hasan Deobandi, Ubaidullah Sindhi	British India	Intellectual	Inactive	
4	Jamiat Ulema-e-Hind	1919	Abdul Bari Firangi Mahali, Ahmad Saeed Dehlavi, Kifayatullah Dehlawi, Sanaullah Amritsari	India	Charitable	Active	
5	Nadwatul Ulama	1893	Muhammad Ali Mungeri	India	Intellectual	Active	
6	Majlis-e-Ahrar-ul-Islam	1929	Syed Ata Ullah Shah Bukhari	India, Pakistan	Political	Active	
7	Jamiat Ulema-e-Islam	1945	Shabbir Ahmad Usmani	Pakistan	Political	Active	
8	Imarat-e-Shariah	1921	Abul Muhasin Muhammad Sajjad	Bihar, Odisha, Jharkhand	Fiqh	Active	
9	Tablighi Jamaat	1926	Ilyas Kandhlawi	Worldwide	Dawah	Active	
10	Majlis-e Dawatul Haq	1939	Ashraf Ali Thanwi	British India	Islah	Active	
11	Payam-e-Insaniyat	1974	Abul Hasan Ali Hasani Nadwi	India	Dawah	Active	
12	All India Muslim Personal Law Board	1973	Muhammad Tayyib Qasmi	India	Nonpolitical	Active	
13	Jamiatul Ulama South Africa	1923		South Africa	Nonpolitical	Active	
14	Muslim Union Party	1979	Abdul Aziz Malazada	Iran	Political	Inactive	
15	All Ceylon Jamiyyathul Ulama	1924		Sri Lanka	Nonpolitical	Active	
16	Taliban	1994	Mullah Omar	Afghanistan	Political	Active	
17	All India Muslim Personal Law Board	1973	Muhammad Tayyib Qasmi	India	Fiqh	Active	
18	Islamic Sharia Council	1982		UK	Fiqh	Active	
19	Hefazat-e-Islam Bangladesh	2010	Shah Ahmad Shafi	Bangladesh	Nonpolitical	Active	
20	Aalmi Majlis Tahaffuz Khatm-e-Nubuwwat	1954	Syed Ata Ullah Shah Bukhari	Pakistan	Nonpolitical	Active	
21	Anjumane Hefajothe Islam Bangladesh	1944	Lutfur Rahman Varnavi	Bangladesh	Nonpolitical	Active	
22	Islamic Fiqh Academy, India	1988	Mujahidul Islam Qasmi	India	Fiqh	Active	
23	Majlis-e Dawatul Haq Bangladesh	1980s	Abrarul Haq Haqqi, Muhammadullah Hafezzi, Hakeem Muhammad Akhtar	Bangladesh	Islah	Active	
24	Sawad-e-Azam Ahle Sunnah	1980s		Pakistan	Nonpolitical	Active	
25	Jamiat Ishaat Tauheed wa Sunnat	1957	Hussain Ali	Pakistan, Afghanistan	Nonpolitical	Active	
26	Jamiat Ulama Britain	1975		UK	Political	Active	
27	Bangladesh Jamiyatul Ulama	2014	Farid Uddin Masood	Bangladesh	Nonpolitical	Active	
28	International Majlis-e Tahaffuz-e-Khatm-e Nobuwat Bangladesh	1990	Ubaidul Haq, Nurul Islam Jihadi	Bangladesh	Nonpolitical	Active	
29	Jamiat Ulema-e-Islam (F)	1988	Fazlur Rahman	Pakistan	Political	Active	
30	Jamiat Ulama-e-Islam Nazryati	2007	Maulvi Asmatullah	Pakistan	Political	Inactive	
31	Jamiat Ulema-e-Islam Pakistan	2020	Muhammad Khan Sherani	Pakistan	Political	Active	
32	Jamiat Ulema-e-Islam (S)	1980	Samiul Haq	Pakistan	Political	Active	
33	Pakistan Rah-e-Haq Party	2012	Ibrahim Khan Qasmi	Pakistan	Political	Active	
34	Islami Andolan Bangladesh	1987	Fazlul Karim	Bangladesh	Political	Active	
35	Muslim Independent Party	1935	Abul Muhasin Muhammad Sajjad	British India	Political	Inactive	
36	Sipah-e-Sahaba Pakistan	1985	Haq Nawaz Jhangvi	Pakistan	Political	Active	
37	Islami Oikya Jote	1990	Azizul Haque, Fazlul Karim	Bangladesh	Political	Active	
38	Khelafat Majlis	1989	Azizul Haque	Bangladesh	Political	Active	
39	Jamiat Ulema-e-Islam Bangladesh	1971		Bangladesh	Political	Active	
40	Nizam-e-Islam Party	1952	Athar Ali Bengali	Bangladesh	Political	Active	
41	Bangladesh Khilafat Andolan	1990	Muhammadullah Hafezzi	Bangladesh	Political	Active	
42	Bangladesh Khelafat Majlish	1989	Azizul Haque	Bangladesh	Political	Active	
43	Combined Action Committee	1984	Muhammadullah Hafezzi	Bangladesh	Political	Inactive	
44	Rabeta-e Madaris-e Islamia Arabia	1995		India	Board of Education	Active	
45	Al-Haiatul Ulya Lil-Jamiatil Qawmia Bangladesh	2018	Government of Bangladesh	Bangladesh	Board of Education	Active	
46	Wifaq ul Madaris Al-Arabia, Pakistan	1982		Pakistan	Board of Education	Active	
47	Majma-ul-Uloom Al-Islamia	2021	Jamia Binoria, Jamia Tur Rasheed	Pakistan	Board of Education	Active	
48	Befaqul Madarisil Arabia Bangladesh	1978		Bangladesh	Board of Education	Active	
49	Anjuman-e-Ittihadul Madaris Bangladesh	1959	Haji Mohammad Younus	Bangladesh	Board of Education	Active	
50	Azad Dini Edara-e Talim Bangladesh	1941	Hussain Ahmad Madani	Bangladesh	Board of Education	Active	
51	National Religious Madrasa Education Board of Bangladesh	2016	Farid Uddin Masood	Bangladesh	Board of Education	Active	
52	Tanazimul Madarisid Diniya Bangladesh	1995	Abdur Rahman (scholar)	Bangladesh	Board of Education	Active	
53	Befakul Madarisil Qaumiya Gauhardanga Bangladesh			Bangladesh	Board of Education	Active	
54	Aid Organization of the Ulema	1996	Rashid Ahmed Ludhianvi	Pakistan	Charitable	Inactive	
55	Al-Markazul Islami	1988	Shahidul Islam	Bangladesh	Charitable	Active	
56	Al Manahil Welfare Foundation Bangladesh	1998	Zamir Uddin Nanupuri	Bangladesh	Charitable	Active	
57	Taqwa Foundation Bangladesh	2020	Gazi Yakub	Bangladesh	Charitable	Active	
58	Hafezzi Charitable Society of Bangladesh	2015		Bangladesh	Charitable	Active	
59	Lashkar-e-Jhangvi	1996	Riaz Basra, Malik Ishaq	Pakistan	Jihadism	Inactive	
60	Jaish-e-Mohammed	2001	Masood Azhar	Kashmir	Jihadism	Active	
61	Harkat-ul-Jihad al-Islami	1990	Fazlur Rehman Khalil, Qari Saifullah Akhtar	Indian subcontinent	Jihadism	Active	
62	Haqqani network	1970	Jalaluddin Haqqani	Afghanistan, Pakistan	Jihadism	Inactive	
63	Tehrik-i-Taliban Pakistan	2007	Baitullah Mehsud	Pakistan	Jihadism	Active	
64	Harkat-ul-Mujahideen	1985	Sajjad Afghani	Pakistan	Jihadism	Active	
65	Lashkar-e-Islam	2004	Mufti Munir Shakir	Pakistan	Jihadism	Inactive	
66	Tehreek-e-Jihad Pakistan	2023	Abdullah Yaghistani	Pakistan	Jihadism	Active	

== See also ==
- List of Deobandi universities
