= Befaqul Madarisiddinia Bangladesh =

Qawmi Education Board

- وفاق المدارس الدينية بنغلاديش
- Founded: 7 October 2016
- Founder: Farid Uddin Masood
- Headquarters: Zahurul Islam City, Aftab Nagar, Badda, Dhaka-1212
- Chairman: Farid Uddin Masood
- Secretary General: Mohammad Ali
- Parent organisation: Al-Haiatul Ulya Lil-Jamiatil Qawmia Bangladesh
- Affiliations: Deobandi
- Website: jdmboard.com

Befaqul Madarisiddinia Bangladesh (Arabic: وفاق المدارس الدينية بنغلاديش) is a government-recognized Qawmi madrasa Board of Education in Bangladesh. It is the newest of the Qawmi Madrasa education boards in Bangladesh. The board was formed on 8 October 2016 under the leadership of Farid Uddin Masood and officially launched on 15 October. There are over 800 madrasas under this board.

== History ==
The first council of the board was held on 2 October 2021 in Dhaka. At this session, Farid Uddin Masood was re-elected as president. Four individuals — Asad Al Hussaini, Shamsul Huda Khan, Mujibur Rahman, and Delwar Hussain Saifi — were appointed as advisors to the board. Yahya Mahmud and Abul Kashem were selected as senior vice-presidents. Six individuals — Mushtaq Ahmed, Abdul Baten Faridi, Hifzur Rahman Khan, Mumtazul Karim, Shamsul Haque, and Hussain Ahmed — were appointed as vice-presidents. Mohammad Ali was reappointed as Secretary General. Additionally, four individuals were appointed as Assistant Secretaries General.

== See also ==
- List of Deobandi organisations
