= Al-Haiatul Ulya Lil-Jamiatil Qawmia Bangladesh =

Government Qawmi Universities of Bangladesh

Coordinates: 23.7114°N 90.4462°E

- আল-হাইআতুল উলয়া লিল-জামিয়াতিল কওমিয়া বাংলাদেশ
- Formation: 2017
- Purpose: Educational
- Region served: Bangladesh
- Official language: Bengali; Arabic
- Chairman: Mahmudul Hasan
- Co-Chairman: Sajidur Rahman
- Website: hems.alhaiatululya.org

Al-Hayʼat al-ʿUlyā lil-Jāmiʿāt al-Qawmiyyah Bangladesh (Arabic: الهيئة العليا للجامعات القومية ﺑﻨﻐﻼدﻳش, romanized: Supreme Authority to Qawmi Universities of Bangladesh) is the government-recognized combined Qawmi Madrasah Education Board of Bangladesh, having the authority to arrange central examinations and to issue certificates. It consists of six Qawmi Madrasah Education Boards: Befaqul Madarisil Arabia Bangladesh, Befaqul Madarisil Qawmia Gauhordanga Bangladesh, Anjumane Ittehadul Madaris Bangladesh, Azad Deeni Edaraye Talim Bangladesh, Tanjeemul Madarisid Diniya Bangladesh, and Jatiya Deeni Madrasa Shikkha Board Bangladesh.

== Background ==
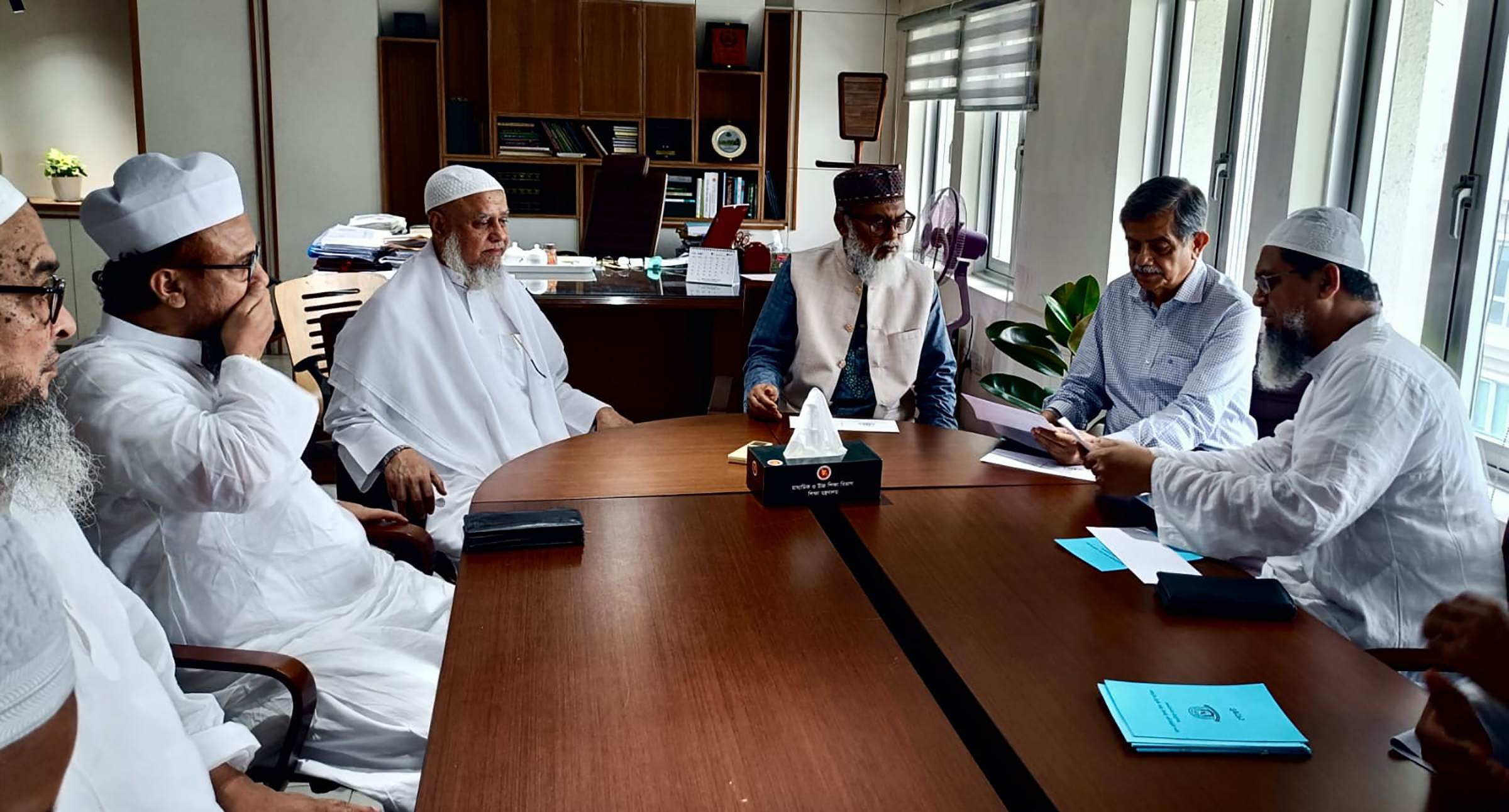
Al-Haiatul Ulya leaders meets with Education adviser Chowdhury Rafiqul Abrar

Prime Minister Sheikh Hasina announced on 11 April 2017 that, on the basis of the principles of the Darul Uloom Deoband, a Dawra-e-Hadith certificate issued by a Qawmi Madrasah would be treated as equivalent to a master's degree in Islamic studies and Arabic. Two days later the Ministry of Education published a gazette elaborating on the decision. It gave a committee formed by the Qawmi Madrasah boards the authority to supervise the Dawrah-e-Hadith examinations.

On 19 September 2018, parliament passed a bill putting the decision into law, retrospective to April 2017. It recognized Al-Haiatul Ulya Lil-Jamiatil Qawmia Bangladesh as a board that integrates the six existing Qawmi Madrasa education boards: Befaqul Madarisil Arabia Bangladesh, Befaqul Madarisil Qawmia Gauhordanga Bangladesh, Anjuman-e-Ittihadul Madaris Bangladesh, Azad Deeni Edaraye Talim Bangladesh, Tanjeemul Madarisid Diniya Bangladesh and Jatiya Deeni Madrasa Shikkha Board Bangladesh. The chairman of Befaqul Madarisil Arabia Bangladesh will be the ex officio chairman of the combined board.

== Objectives and functions ==
The Haiatul Ulya was founded to ensure a standardized curriculum and to provide centralized examinations for all of the institutions under six Qawmi Madrasa Education Board, and hence to be able to get government recognition. The main functions of the federation are: creation of syllabus, checking standard of education, arrangement of examination and issuance of degrees.

== Notable institutions ==
The following are some of the notable Qawmi Madrasahs in Bangladesh:

- Al-Jamiatul Ahlia Darul Ulum Moinul Islam
- Jamia Islamia Darul Ulum Madania, Jatrabari, Dhaka
- Jamia Tawakkulia Renga Madrasah
- Jamiatul Uloom Al-Islamia Lalkhan Bazar - also known as Lalkhan Bazar Madrasah
- Jamia Qurania Arabia Lalbagh
- Al-Jamiah Al-Islamiah Patiya
- Jamia Shariyyah Malibagh, Dhaka
- Jamia Rahmania Arabia Dhaka
- Jamia Darul Ma'arif Al-Islamia
- Jamia nuria islamia bharthokhola, sylhet

== See also ==
- List of Deobandi organisations
