= List of Qawmi madrasas =

As of 2006, there were at least 15,000 Qawmi madrasahs in Bangladesh. Notable ones include:

== Dhaka Division ==
=== Dhaka District ===
- Islamic Research Center Bangladesh, Bashundhara, Dhaka
- Jamia Qurania Arabia Lalbagh, Dhaka
- Jamia Shari'ah Malibag, Dhaka
- Sheikh Zakariyyah Islamic Research Center, Dhaka
- Jamia Arabia Hazi Younus (Qawmi Madrasah), Kadamtali Dhaka
- Jamia Rahmania Arabia, Mohammadpur Dhaka

== Chittagong Division ==
=== Brahmanbaria District ===
- Jamiah Islamiah Yunusia Brahmanbaria
- Jamiah Darul Arqam Al-Islamia Brahmanbaria

=== Chittagong District ===
- Al-Jamiah Al-Islamiah Obaidia Nanupur
- Al-Jameatul Arabiatul Islamia Ziri
- Al-Jamiah Al-Islamiah Patiya
- Al-Jamiatul Ahlia Darul Ulum Moinul Islam
- Al Jameatul Arabia Lil Banina Wal Banat, Haildhar, Anwara
- Al-Jamiatul Islamiah Azizul Uloom Babunagar
- Al-Jamiatul Arabia Lil Baneena Wal Banaat Haildhar
- Jamia Darul Ma'arif Al-Islamia
- Jamiatul Uloom Al-Islamia Lalkhan Bazar
- Al Jamiatul Arabia Nasirul Islam
- Al-Jameatul-Islamia Qasemul Uloom Charia
- Al-Jameatul Islamia Al-Arabia Mozaherul Uloom

=== Chandpur District ===
- Jamia Islamia Ibrahimia

== Sylhet Division ==
=== Sylhet District ===
- Jamia Tawakkulia Renga Madrasah
- Jamia Madania Angura Mohammadpur

== Bibliography ==
- Golam Sarwar, Mohammad (November 2013). বাংলা ভাষায় ফিকহ চর্চা (১৯৪৭—২০০৬):স্বরূপ ও বৈশিষ্ট্য বিচার (PDF). Dhaka University Library (in Bengali).
