= Tariq Masood =

Pakistani Islamic scholar (born 1975)

Mufti Tariq Masood
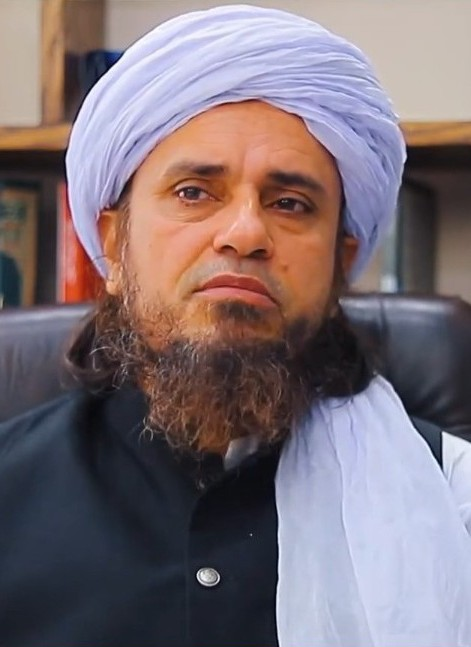
- Masood in 2021

Personal life
- Born: 1975 (age 50–51) Sargodha, Punjab, Pakistan
- Main interest(s): Islamic jurisprudence, Hadith, Family law
- Notable work: Ek Se Za'id Shadiyon Ki Zarurat Kiyun? (transl. Why Is There a Need for More Than One Marriage?)
- Education: Jamia Tur Rasheed, Karachi
- Occupation: Islamic scholar, preacher, author
- Website: muftitariqmasood.com

Religious life
- Religion: Islam
- Denomination: Sunni
- Jurisprudence: Hanafi
- Movement: Deobandi

Tariq Masood (Note: Urdu: طارق مسعود) (born 1975) is a Pakistani Sunni Deobandi Islamic scholar, mufti, preacher, and author. He studied the Dars-i Nizami curriculum at Jamia Tur Rasheed in Karachi, where he specialised in Islamic jurisprudence and later taught in its Darul Ifta. He also serves as imam of Masjid al-Falahia in Karachi.

== Early life and education ==
Tariq Masood was born in 1975 in Sargodha, into a family of Muhajir origin.

He received his early schooling in Karachi and was briefly enrolled at Sindh Muslim Government Science College before leaving to pursue full-time religious studies. At Jamia Tur Rasheed in Karachi, he completed the traditional Dars-i Nizami curriculum, followed by advanced training in Hadith studies and a specialisation in Islamic jurisprudence under Abu Lubaba Shah Mansoor.

== Career ==
Masood has been teaching the Dars-i Nizami curriculum and working in the Darul Iftaa at Jamia Tur Rasheed for over a decade. He also serves as imam at Masjid Al-Falahia in Karachi. He began delivering sermons on family and social issues, which were widely circulated on social media, gaining him a significant following in Pakistan and among diaspora communities. In March 2024, Masood delivered a counselling session at the Sir Syed University of Engineering and Technology in Karachi, addressing faculty members and students on the relationship between science and religion, and the role of Islamic teachings in guiding social ethics. In May 2025, he addressed the Bunyan-un-Marsoos Conference in Karachi, where senior scholars emphasised national unity and support for Pakistan's armed forces.

=== International engagements ===
In July 2025, Masood undertook a nine-day lecture tour of Bangladesh, speaking in Dhaka, Sylhet, Cox's Bazar and Moulvibazar, including at the University of Dhaka, BUET and Shahjalal University of Science and Technology. Bangladeshi media discussed his popularity among young people, citing his use of humour, discussion of sensitive topics and social media presence.

=== Online presence ===
Masood's sermons are circulated widely on digital platforms, especially YouTube, where multiple dedicated channels host his lectures. As of 2025, his main YouTube channel had a large following, with viewership spread across multiple unofficial channels as well. A 2024 German-language academic study identified him among Pakistani clerics whose Urdu YouTube sermons contained rhetoric hostile towards Jews and Zionism. In 2024, he publicly disagreed with Indian preacher Zakir Naik on YouTube monetisation, stating that income from lawful content is halal, while revenue connected to prohibited products should be given to charity.

== Scholarly assessments ==
A 2023 chapter published by De Gruyter analysed his preaching style on social media, arguing that his influence derives as much from performance as from religious authority. The study highlighted his frequent use of humour, body language, and confrontational tone particularly in critiques of liberals and the Aurat March as central to his appeal, and concluded that within its scope he is considered among the more impactful Deobandi preachers in contemporary Pakistan.

A 2023 article in The Dialogue on digital media and Islamic preaching in Pakistan noted that Masood is among the scholars who have made significant use of online platforms to disseminate religious knowledge.

A 2024 study in the University of Chitral Journal of Linguistics & Literature examined his YouTube sermons and podcasts through a pragmatic lens. It found that his discourse is dominated by directive speech acts aimed at advising and persuading, with a soft and humorous tone that sets him apart from harsher clerical voices. The researchers argued that this communicative style contributes to his popularity among youth while also reinforcing social cohesion and tolerance within Pakistani society.

A 2024 article in Contemporary Islam discussed the evolving preaching methods of the Tablighi Jamaat, observing that figures such as Masood have played a role in expanding outreach through social media. The study noted that alongside other clerics, academics, and professionals, Masood used scholarly knowledge and digital platforms to frame religious discourse in ways that engage with reason and science, reflecting broader shifts in the movement's style of communication.

A 2025 study of popular Pakistani YouTube podcasts includes Masood among frequently featured religious scholars and examines how his appearances frame topics such as marriage, gender roles, and modesty.

Masood's sermons have been cited by members of the public in religious queries submitted to the online fatwa portal (Darulifta-Deoband.com) of Darul Uloom Deoband. In some cases, his statements are also explicitly endorsed in the muftis’ responses, reflecting his influence within Deobandi circles.

== Views and controversies ==
Masood's sermons, focused on Islamic jurisprudence, family law, and social issues, have drawn significant debate in Pakistan and abroad.

=== Views on Islamic banking ===
A 2023 analytical study of YouTube lectures reports that, in Masood's view, profit taken by Islamic banks is distinct from conventional interest (riba). The study summarises that he describes Islamic banks as operating through contracts such as mudarabah, musharakah, ijarah and bayʿ al-salam. It further attributes to him comments about practical issues (for example, a bank's refusal to open his account and the imposition of penalties), and concludes that he regards Islamic banking, in situations of compulsion, as the "lesser of two sins" compared to conventional interest-based finance.

=== Theological views on Sufi epithets ===
Masood has discussed the Sufi epithet al-ghawth al-aʿzam, traditionally applied to ʿAbd al-Qadir Gilani, and advises avoiding its use in the present age on the juristic principle of sadd al-dharaʾiʿ ("blocking the means"), while refraining from declaring its users unbelievers. A 2022 article in Islamic Studies situates this stance within the broader Deobandi tradition, comparing it to earlier restrictions on devotional practices under the concept of fasād al-zamān ("corruption of the age").

=== Blasphemy allegations (2024) ===
In September 2024, clips circulated on social media alleging that Masood had questioned the Prophet Muhammad's literacy and referred to errors in the Quran, sparking backlash and a police complaint in Karachi.

He later issued apologies stating his remarks were taken out of context and reaffirming his respect for the Quran and the Prophet.

According to a commentary in DW Urdu, the allegations highlighted how blasphemy accusations in Pakistan have become increasingly weaponised, with Masood's case used by rival clerics to inflame public sentiment.
