= Muhammad Naeem (scholar) =

Pakistani cleric (1958–2020)

- محمد نعیم

Chancellor of Jamia Binoria
- In office unknown – 20 June 2020
- Succeeded by: Noman Naeem

Personal life
- Born: 1958
- Died: 20 June 2020 (aged 61–62) Karachi, Pakistan
- Resting place: Jamia Binoria cemetery
- Children: Noman Naeem

Religious life
- Religion: Islam
- Denomination: Sunni
- Institute: Jamia Binoria; Wifaq ul Madaris Al-Arabia
- Founder of: Jamia Binoria

Muhammad Naeem (1958 – 20 June 2020) was a Pakistani Islamic scholar who served as chancellor of Jamia Binoria, an Islamic university in Karachi.

He founded the Deobandi seminary Jamia Binoria and was executive member of Wifaq ul Madaris Al-Arabia, Pakistan.

He played a significant role in shaping 'Paigham-e-Pakistan' – a historic fatwa against terrorism and had also spoken out against suicide bombings and terrorism in Pakistan.

== Biography ==
=== Family ===
His paternal family came from Surat in Indian Gujarat. His grandfather was born a Parsi who adopted Islam. He was born in 1958.

He is survived by his wife, three sons and two daughters. Earlier in 2014, his son-in-law, Masood Beg, was killed in an attack in Karachi.

== Death and legacy ==
He died in Karachi on 20 June 2020 because of a heart attack. However Chief Minister Sindh Murad Ali Shah revealed in a speech at Sindh Assembly that Mufti Naeem, Talib Jauhri and Munawar Hasan, all of the three clerics who died in past week were due to COVID-19 during the COVID-19 pandemic in Pakistan.

His funeral prayer was led by Taqi Usmani. The funeral was attended by scholars like Muhammad Hanif Jalandhari, Hakeem Azhar of Ashraf ul Madaris, Taqi Usmani's son Muhammad Imran Ashraf Usmani of Jamia Darul Uloom, Karachi, Merajul Huda Siddiqui, Saeed Ahmad Afridi and his students. Prime Minister of Pakistan Imran Khan, President Arif Alvi, Governor of Sindh Imran Ismail and the Chief Minister of Sindh Syed Murad Ali Shah expressed sadness over his death.
