= Mahmudul Hasan (scholar) =

Bangladeshi Islamic scholar

- মাহমুদুল হাসান

President, Al Haiatul Ulya
- Incumbent
- Assumed office 2020
- Preceded by: Shah Ahmad Shafi

President, Befaqul Madarisil Arabia Bangladesh
- Incumbent
- Assumed office 2020
- Preceded by: Shah Ahmad Shafi

Chancellor, Jamia Islamia Darul Uloom Madania
- Incumbent
- Assumed office 1980
- Preceded by: Tajammul Ali

Editor, Monthly Al Jamia
- Incumbent
- Assumed office 1983

Personal details
- Born: 5 July 1950 (age 76) Mymensingh, East Bengal, Pakistan
- Children: 2
- Education: Jamia Uloom-ul-Islamia; Jamia Qurania Arabia Lalbagh; Al Jamiatul Imdadia Kishorganj

Personal life
- Era: Modern
- Main interest(s): Hadith, Fiqh, Writing, Tasawwuf

Religious life
- Religion: Islam
- Denomination: Sunni
- Jurisprudence: Hanafi
- Teachers: Qazi Mu'tasim Billah
- Movement: Deobandi

Muslim leader
- Influenced by: Ashraf Ali Thanwi, Abrarul Haq Haqqi, Shah Ahmad Shafi, Muhammad Yousuf Banuri, Saleemullah Khan, Zafar Ahmad Usmani, Muhammad Zakariyya al-Kandhlawi
- Influenced: Nizamuddin Shamzai, Rezaul Karim

Hasan giving a speech about the Tablighi movement.

Maḥmūd al-Ḥasan ibn Ghalim ad-Dīn Aḥmad al-Muʾminshāhawī (Arabic: محمود الحسن بن غلم الدين أحمد المؤمنشاهوي; born 5 July 1950), or simply Mahmudul Hasan (Bengali: মাহমুদুল হাসান), is a Bangladeshi Deobandi Islamic scholar, writer, religious reformer, educator, public speaker and spiritual figure. He is the president of Al-Haiatul Ulya Lil-Jamiatil Qawmia Bangladesh and Befaqul Madarisil Arabia Bangladesh, chancellor of Jamia Islamia Darul Uloom Madania, Khatib at Gulshan Central Jama Masjid, editor in chief of Monthly Al-Jamia and Amir of Majlis-e Dawatul Haq Bangladesh. He is the author of Tafsirul Burhanul Quran.

== Early Life ==
Mahmudul Hasan was born on 5 July 1950, to a Bengali Muslim family in the village of Charkharicha under Kotwali Thana in Mymensingh District . His father's name is Galimuddin Ahmed and mother's name is Fatema Ramzani.

== Career ==
Currently he is Khatib at Gulshan Central Azad Mosque and Eidgah Society, Amir of Majlish-e-Dawatul Haque Bangladesh .

On 3 October 2020, he is elected president of Befaqul Madarisil Arabia Bangladesh, the largest education board of Qawmi Madrasah . According to law, he is the president of Al-Haiatul Ulya Lil-Jamiatil Qawmia Bangladesh, the highest education board of Qawmi Madrasah.

== Publications ==
He has published books in Arabic, Bengali and Urdu. His books include:

- Hasan, Mahmudul (2023). Tafsirul Burhanul Quran তাফসিরুল বুরহানূল কুরআন (in Bengali). Maktabatul Abrar.
1. Al Imam Abu Yusuf: Muhaddisan wa Faqihan
2. Ar Raddul Jamil
3. Dawatul Haq and Dawat-e-Tabligh
4. Islamic state thought
5. Love for the Prophet's family
6. Hayate Abrar
7. Hayate Usmani
8. Al Burhanul Muayyad
9. Tohfaye Abrar
10. Tohfaye Sunnah
11. Adarsa Motobad
12. Mawaeze Hasanah
13. Search for Siratul Mustakim

== See more ==
- Fazlul Hoque Amini
- Junaid Babunagari
- Muhiuddin Khan

== Bibliography ==
- Gazali, Tofayel (2020). "This Maulana Mahmudul Hasan is the successor of Allama Shafi" আল্লামা শফীর স্থলাভিষিক্ত কে এই মাওলানা মাহমুদুল হাসান. Jugantor (in Bengali).

Political offices
| Preceded by Shah Ahmad Shafi | Chairman of Befaqul Madarisil Arabia Bangladesh; 2020-present | Succeeded by |
