= Al-Ghazali University =

Public university in Karachi, Pakistan

- جامعۃ الغزالی
- Type: Islamic university
- Established: 2022
- Founder: Mufti Abdur Rahim
- Affiliations: Higher Education Commission; Jamia Tur Rasheed
- Vice-Chancellor: Zeeshan Ahmed
- Location: Ahsanabad, Karachi, Sindh, Pakistan

Al-Ghazali University is an Islamic public university in Karachi founded by Jamia Tur Rasheed on 9 December 2022. Mufti Abdur Rahim is the founder and current chancellor. Zeeshan Ahmed is the vice-chancellor.

The university is named after the 12th century scholar al-Ghazali.

== History ==
In March 2022, the Charter Inspection and Evaluation Committee visited Al-Ghazali University after which they submit its report to the Sindh Higher Education Commission for approval.

In late October 2022, Governor of Sindh Kamran Khan Tessori on his visit to Jamia Tur Rasheed, stated that Al-Ghazali University project was likewise deserving of praise and that he would completely support Al-Ghazali University's approval.

Later, on 9 December 2022, the Sindh Assembly and governor gave the university his approval.

== Faculties ==
- Faculty of Islamic Studies
- Faculty of Social Sciences
- Faculty of Education
- Faculty of Law
