= Jamia Tur Rasheed =

Islamic seminary in Pakistan

Jamia Tur Rasheed, Karachi
- جامعۃ الرشید کراچی
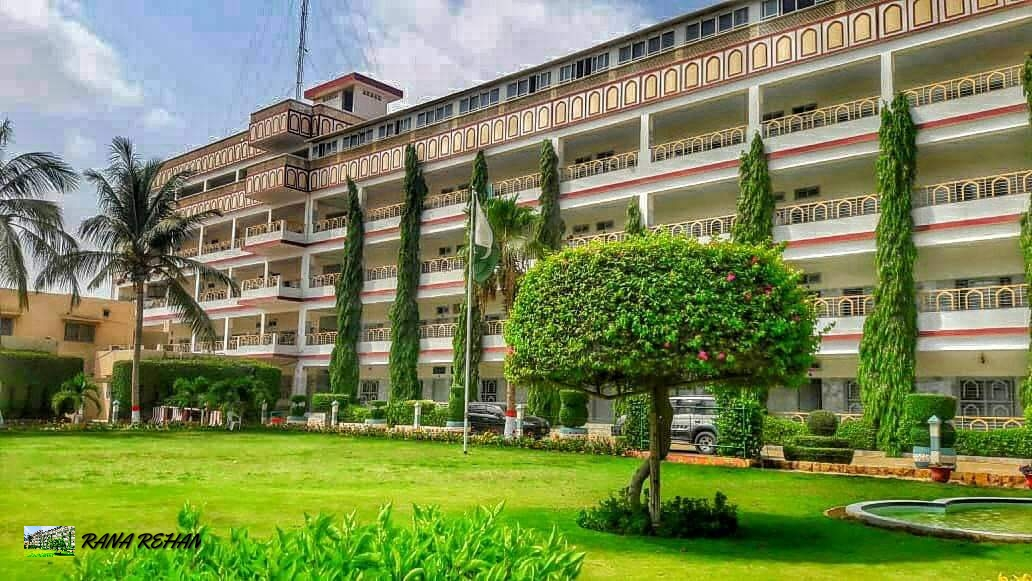
- Type: Islamic university
- Established: 1994
- Founder: Rashid Ahmed Ludhianvi
- Affiliations: Majma-ul-Uloom Al-Islamia
- Rector: Mufti Abdur Raheem
- Dean: Mufti Abdul Raheem (Chief Mufti)
- Location: Ahsanabad, Karachi, Sindh, Pakistan; 24°50′44.74″N 67°9′55.17″E
- Website: jtr.edu.pk

Jamia Tur Rasheed, Karachi (Urdu: جامعۃ الرشید کراچی) is an Islamic seminary in Karachi, Pakistan. The seminary was established by Rasheed Ahmad Ludhianvi. It is a degree-awarding institute accredited by the Ministry of Federal Education and Professional Training and the Higher Education Commission.

The seminary has 36 departments including "Kulyatush Shariyah". It also runs girls schools including "Jamia Umm Habībah lil-Banāt", "Jamia Hafsa lil-Banāt" and "Al-Bairuni Girls Secondary School".

The seminary co-formed "Majma-ul-Uloom Al-Islamia" (Board of Islamic Sciences) along with Jamia Binoria in May 2021, to blend secular and religious education in the "madrasas".

In December 2022 the seminary established Al-Ghazali University.

Mufti Abdul Rahim is the current head of the seminary.

== Mission and services ==
Jamia Tur Rasheed was established to provide a comprehensive education system that blends Islamic and modern knowledge. Its goal is to nurture individuals who excel in both spiritual and worldly matters, equipping them to contribute positively to all sectors of society.

== History ==
The Jamia Tur Rasheed was founded by Rashid Ahmed Ludhianvi, with the intention of creating a "Darul Ifta" (juristic council) which would limit itself to subjects unrepresented in other seminaries. The department of "Tamrīn-e-Ifta" did not exist in any other seminary in Pakistan, and it inspired Ludhyanwi to set up the new seminary in Ahsanabad. The seminary has 36 departments.

The departments include "Mahd al-Rashīd al-Arabi" which promotes the Arabic language, and "Takhassus fi al-iftā", which is the first such department in whole of the Pakistan. Ludhyanwi established the department in 1964. The department teaches astronomy and geography as well. The department of communication in the seminary was started by Mateen-ur-Rehman Murtaza, a former chairman of Karachi University's mass communication department.

The seminary started its "Kulyatush-Shariyah" program and department in 2003 for the highest performing students, to equip them with traditional Islamic sciences in a span of four years.

In February 2021, the Ministry of Federal Education and Professional Training and the Higher Education Commission accredited the Jamia Tur Rasheed as a degree awarding institute. Its degree was approved to be equivalent to a double MA.

In May 2021, Jamia Tur Rasheed formed a new board, "Majma'a Uloom al-Islāmiya" along with Jamia Binoria, disaffiliating itself from the Wifaqul Madaris. The new board is approved by the Ministry of Federal Education and Professional Training, and aims "to promote modern education with religious studies at "madrasas" so that students of seminaries could avail the equal opportunity and play their role in the development of society as well", according to the Academia Magazine.

== Sub-institutions ==
The "Jamia Umm Habībah lil-Banāt", "Jamia Hafsa lil-Banāt", "Al-Bairuni Girls Secondary School" and "Karachi Institute of Management and Sciences (KIMS)" run under the Jamia Tur Rasheed where girls study traditional Islamic sciences along with the secular classes. The Jamia also runs "Al-Bairuni Model Secondary School" and Intermediate College, both approved and accredited by the Government of Sindh.

== JTR Media house ==
The seminary has a media house, based on its three-vision slogan, "Education, Broadcast and Service". The seminary aims to start an educational web channel and a Satellite TV channel.

== Faculty ==
- Mufti Abdur Raheem
- Mufti Asad Ullah Shahbaz
- Mufti Tariq Masood
- Syed Adnan Kakakhail

== Publications ==
The seminary publishes:

- Weekly BachoN ka Islām, reportedly read by more than 100,000 children.
- Weekly Khawāteen ka Islām
- Shariah and Business, reportedly seen as the biggest magazine on the topic in Urdu.
- The Truth, published in English.

== See also ==
- Jamia Binoria
