= Majma-ul-Uloom Al-Islamia =

Education Board

- Purpose: Educational Board
- Headquarters: Karachi
- Region served: Pakistan
- Official language: Arabic, Urdu
- Leader: Mufti Abdul Rahim (President); Abu Lubaba (Vice President)
- Affiliations: Jamia Tur Rasheed; Jamia Binoria
- Website: https://mui.edu.pk/

Majma-ul-Uloom Al-Islamia (MUI) is an educational board jointly established by Jamiat-ur-Rasheed and Jamia Binoria. It was founded on 10 May 2021. The board is officially approved by the Ministry of Federal Education and Professional Training and the Higher Education Commission of Pakistan.

== Recognized education board ==
This educational institution or education board is recognized both by the Government of Pakistan's Ministry of Federal Education and Professional Training as well as the Higher Education Commission of Pakistan, the highest governing bodies of education in Pakistan.

== Campuses ==
Majma-ul-Uloom Al-Islamia has its provincial office at the Jamia tur Rasheed Lahore Campus.

Two major Pakistani 'Jamias' (universities) namely Jamiat-ur-Rasheed and Jamia Binoria have jointly established this education board to educate people and award degrees in Arabic language and Islamic Studies.

== Board members ==
- Mufti Abdul Rahim (President)
- Maulana Noman Naeem (Vice President)
- Hazrat Maulana Mufti Muhammad (Nazim-e-Ala)
- Maulana Farhan Naeem (Director of Education)
- Maulana Ghulam Qasim (Examiner)
- Mufti Rashid Ahmad Khurshid (Director of Affiliation)
- Maulana Altaf-ur-Rehman (Director of Training)
- Maulana Ehsan Waqar (Finance Director)
- Mufti Ahmad Afnan (Curriculum and Translator)
- Dr. Maulana Ayaz Ahmad Shah (Nazim Public Relations)
- Maulana Abdul Muneem Faiz (Moderator)
