= Al Manahil Welfare Foundation Bangladesh =

Bangladeshi charitable organisation

- Nickname: Al Manahil
- Formation: 1998; 28 years ago
- Founder: Jamir Uddin Nanupuri
- Founded at: Nanupur, Fatikchhari, Chittagong
- Type: NGO, Charitable organization
- Registration no.: 3023
- Legal status: Foundation
- Headquarters: Al-Jamiah Al-Islamiah Obaidia Nanupur
- Region served: Bangladesh
- Chairman: Helaluddin bin Jamir Uddin
- Website: amwfb.org almanahilbd.com

Al Manahil Welfare Foundation Bangladesh is a non-profit charitable organization that was established in 1998 by Jamir Uddin Nanupuri, a spiritual leader, in the Fatikchhari Upazila of Chittagong, Bangladesh. The organization has been actively engaged in various programs, including drilling wells, constructing mosques and madrasas, establishing orphanages, distributing disaster relief, and providing educational and service programs for Rohingya refugees since its inception. Its significant contributions to healthcare during the COVID-19 pandemic have been widely recognized. Moreover, the organization also operates Al Manahil Nurture General Hospital, further extending its efforts towards improving the quality of healthcare in the region.

== History ==
In 2008, a certificate was awarded to it by the Ministry of Social Welfare. It is led by a board of seven members, with Helaluddin bin Jamir Uddin currently serving as its president.

== Activities ==
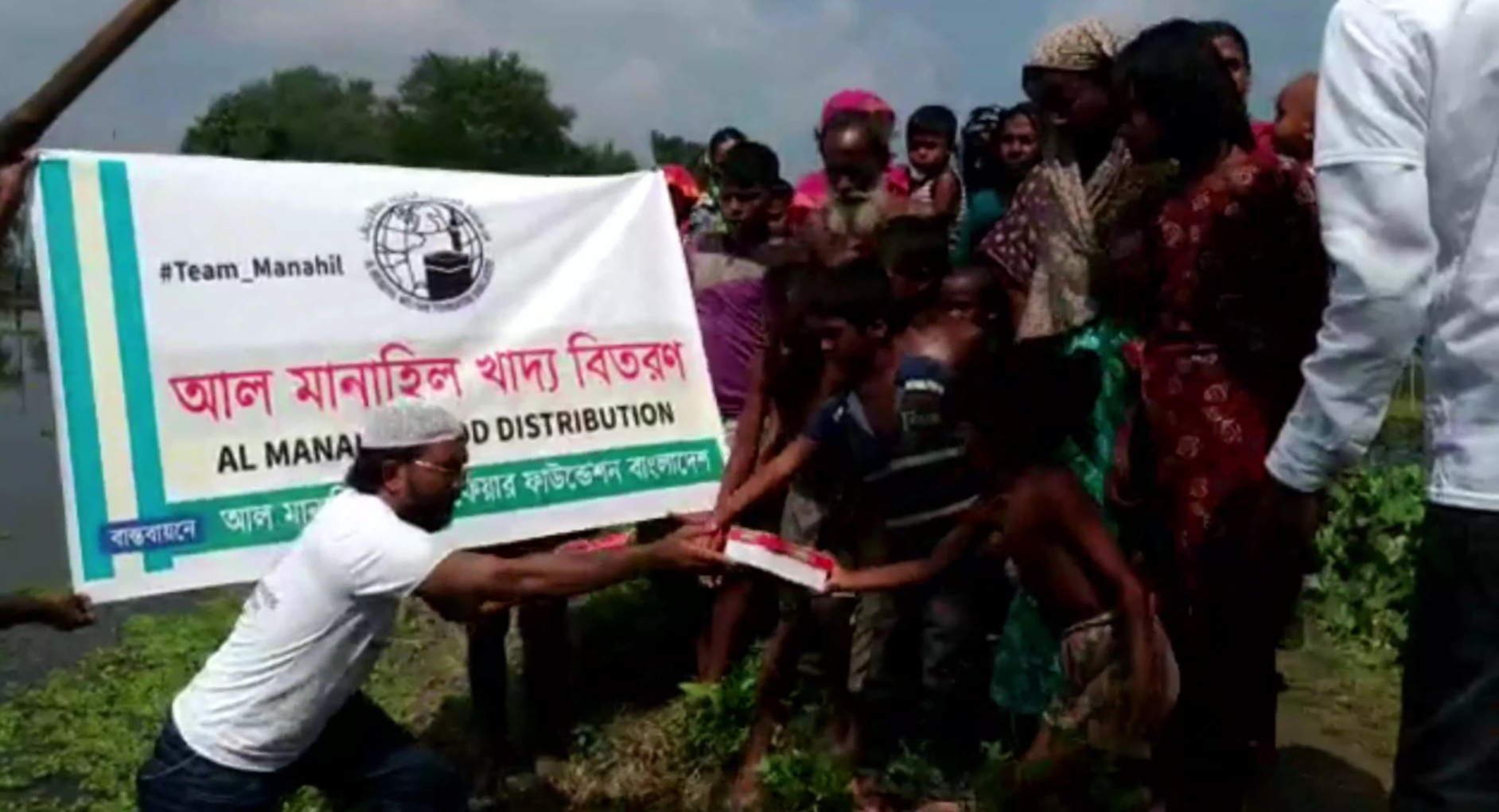
Al Manahil food distribution program in Naogaon

The organization is actively engaged in various projects, aimed at improving the quality of life of people. These initiatives include water supply, food for all, tube wells, Ramadan, Eid al-Adha, support for Rohingya refugees, and mosque construction. According to Al Manahil, they have built more than 3,000 shelters, installed over 200,000 tube wells, and constructed 50 mosques, benefiting approximately 10 million individuals. The Bibirhat Central Jame Mosque, which was built at a cost of 100 million taka, is a particularly impressive accomplishment.

With the outbreak of the COVID-19 pandemic, the organization stepped up to the challenge of burying those who died due to the virus. In addition to this, they also established an 80-bed isolation center in Chittagong to provide medical care to COVID-19 patients. Their efforts have been commendable, with more than 3,000 individuals having received funeral services and shrouds over the course of one year. They have also operated a hospital, ensuring that those who needed medical attention received the care they required.

== Al Manahil Nurture General Hospital ==
The hospital is situated in the FoylaTali Bazar of Halishahar in Chittagong and was built on a donated piece of land. In addition to treating nearly seven hundred COVID-19 patients, the hospital has extended ambulance services to hundreds of other COVID-19 patients, ferrying them to various healthcare facilities.

== See also ==
- List of Deobandi organisations
