= Majlis-e Dawatul Haq Bangladesh =

Non-political Dawah organisation in Bangladesh

- Formation: 1980s
- Founder: Abrarul Haq Haqqi; Muhammadullah Hafezzi; Hakeem Muhammad Akhtar
- Legal status: Active
- Purpose: Dawah
- Headquarters: Jamia Islamia Darul Uloom Madania, Dhaka
- Region served: Bangladesh
- Amir: Mahmudul Hasan
- Key people: Ashraf Ali Thanwi
- Parent organization: Majlis-e Dawatul Haq

Majlis-e Dawatul Haq Bangladesh is one of the largest non-political dawah organisations in Bangladesh. It is headquartered in Jamia Islamia Darul Uloom Madania, Dhaka. The head of this organization is called Amirul Umara. Its current Amirul Umara is Mahmudul Hasan. The practice of this organization started through Abrarul Haq Haqqi. Muhammadullah Hafezzi and Hakeem Muhammad Akhtar played an important role in its establishment. It is one of the significant religious movements organized in Indian subcontinent in 20th century.

== History ==
Ashraf Ali Thanwi started Majlis-e Dawatul Haq in 1939 by identifying five problems of society from the point of view of Islam. To solve the problems, he instructed his disciples to work according to the rules and regulations of the organization in their respective areas. Athar Ali Bengali, Shah Abdul Wahhab, Shamsul Haque Faridpuri and others continued this work in the Bengal. Hafezzi Huzur started this work in Dhaka. After the independence of Bangladesh, due to old age, Hafezzi invited Abrarul Haq Haqqi and Hakeem Muhammad Akhtar to come to Bangladesh. Both of them arrived in Bangladesh in 1981. Hafezzi instructed his disciples to take bayat from them. Then the work of the organization was more dynamic. On 24 April 1993, Abrarul Haq Haqqi came to Bangladesh for the second time. At that time he formed 13 branches of the organization. He appointed an Amir and a Naib-e Amir for each branch and advised them to conduct their activities. He then nominated Mahmudul Hasan as Amirul Umara or Amir of Amirs. Since then, the organization's activities have been run under the supervision of Mahmudul Hasan.

== See also ==
- List of Deobandi organisations
