= Aid Organization of the Ulema =

NGO based in Pakistan

Organization of the Ulema
- Founder: Rashid Ahmed Ludhianvi
- Headquarters: Karachi, Pakistan
- Region served: Pakistan and Afghanistan
- Affiliations: Al Akhtar Trust; Ummah Tamir-e-Nau; Al-Qaeda; Jaish-e-Mohammed; Lashkar-e-Jhangvi; Lashkar-e-Taiba
- Formerly called: Al Rashid Trust

The Aid Organization of the Ulema (AOU), formerly known as the Al Rashid Trust is an NGO based in Pakistan. Beginning in 1996, it supported "charity and welfare projects in Afghanistan and Pakistan" while also providing "financial and legal support to Muslim militants around the world." According to the United States Department of the Treasury, it began raising funds for the Taliban in 1999. It was established by Islamic scholar and jurist Rashid Ahmed Ludhianvi.

According to Alms for Jihad, the organization "provided financial and legal assistance to Islamists in jail, established a network of madrasas and mosques in Afghanistan, and coordinated its activity with the Wafa Khairia, an Afghan charity 'largely funded by bin Laden.'" Its activities also included supporting publications that were "promoting and directly praising the Arab suicide bombers who attacked the twin towers and the Pentagon."

It has been listed by the UN as a financial facilitator of terrorists in September 2001. It was designated as a Global Terrorist Organization under the SDN by the United States Department of the Treasury's Office of Foreign Assets Control, with operations in Afghanistan: Herat, Jalalabad, Kabul, Kandahar, Mazar Sharif; and in Kosovo and Chechnya. Its addresses listed in Pakistan included: Karachi, Mansehra, Peshawar, Rawalpindi, Mingora, and Lahore.

Although its bank accounts were frozen by Pakistan after 9/11, it continued its activities in 2001 by opening new accounts under different names.

Despite UN Security Council sanctions against it, the group continued to operate openly in Pakistan until at least 2020.

== See also ==
- List of Deobandi organisations
