= Noman Naeem =

Pakistani islamic scholar

Numan Naeem
- نعمان نعیم
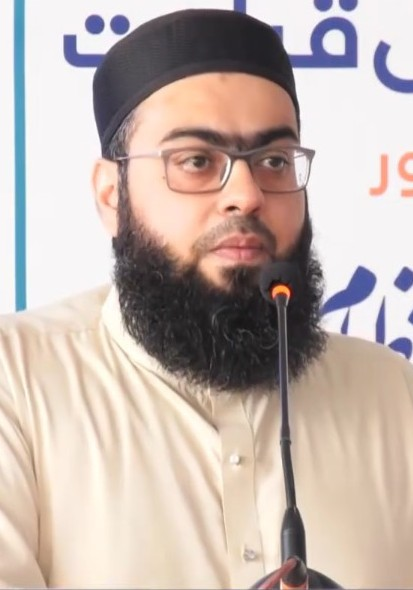
- Noman Naeem in 2021

Chancellor of Jamia Binoria
- Incumbent
- Assumed office 23 June 2020
- Preceded by: Mufti Muhammad Naeem

Personal life
- Born: 27 April 1983 (age 43)
- Parent: Mufti Muhammad Naeem
- Education: Jamia Binoria; Federal Urdu University

Religious life
- Religion: Islam
- Denomination: Deobandi

Noman Naeem (27 April 1983) (Urdu: نعمان نعیم) is a Pakistani Islamic scholar and writer who has served as the chancellor of Jamia Binoria, an Islamic educational institution in Karachi, since 23 June 2020.

== Biography ==
Numan Naeem was born on 27 April 1983. He is the eldest son of Mufti Muhammad Naeem. He studied at the Jamia Binoria. He received a B.A and an M.A from the Federal Urdu University, he is also done his phD in religious studies. He completed his doctoral studies in 2020. His paternal family came from Surat in Indian Gujarat. His great-grandfather was born a Parsi who adopted Islam.

In June 2020, Noman was appointed the chancellor of Jamia Binoria following the death of his father Mufti Muhammad Naeem. He also serves as the vice-president of Majma-ul-Uloom Al-Islamia, an educational board formed in May 2021, to reconcile between the religious and secular education.
