= Ahsanabad =

Neighbourhood in Karachi

Coordinates: 25.003072°N 67.112497°E

Ahsanabad Co-operative Housing Society (ACHS; Urdu: احسن اباد Sindhi: احسن اباد) is a residential neighbourhood in northern Karachi, Sindh, Pakistan. Located within Gadap Town, Ahsanabad is spread over 500 acres south of Maymar Avenue and between northwest of I.B. Soomro Avenue and Shaheed Khalid Bin Waleed Road.

There are several ethnic groups in Ahsanabad Co-operative Housing Society (ACHS) including Muhajirs, Sindhis, Punjabis, Kashmiris, Seraikis, Pakhtuns, Balochis, Memons, Bohras, Ismailis, etc. Over 99% of the population is Muslim.

The overall population of Gadap Town is estimated to be nearly one million. The area has paved roads and access to water, gas and electricity. Plots start from 200 square yards (170 m^{2}) up to 4,000 square yards (3,300 m^{2}). Ahsanabad is also home to Jamia Tur Rasheed, a large mosque affiliated with the Deobandi school of thought.

In the 2010s, Ahsanabad saw increasing land grabbing of amenity plots, parks, and open spaces, primarily driven by organised land mafias. Court-ordered anti-encroachment operations have resulted in violent confrontations.
