= Darul Ma'arif Al-Islamia =

Jamia Darul Ma'arif Al-Islamia
- Darul Marif
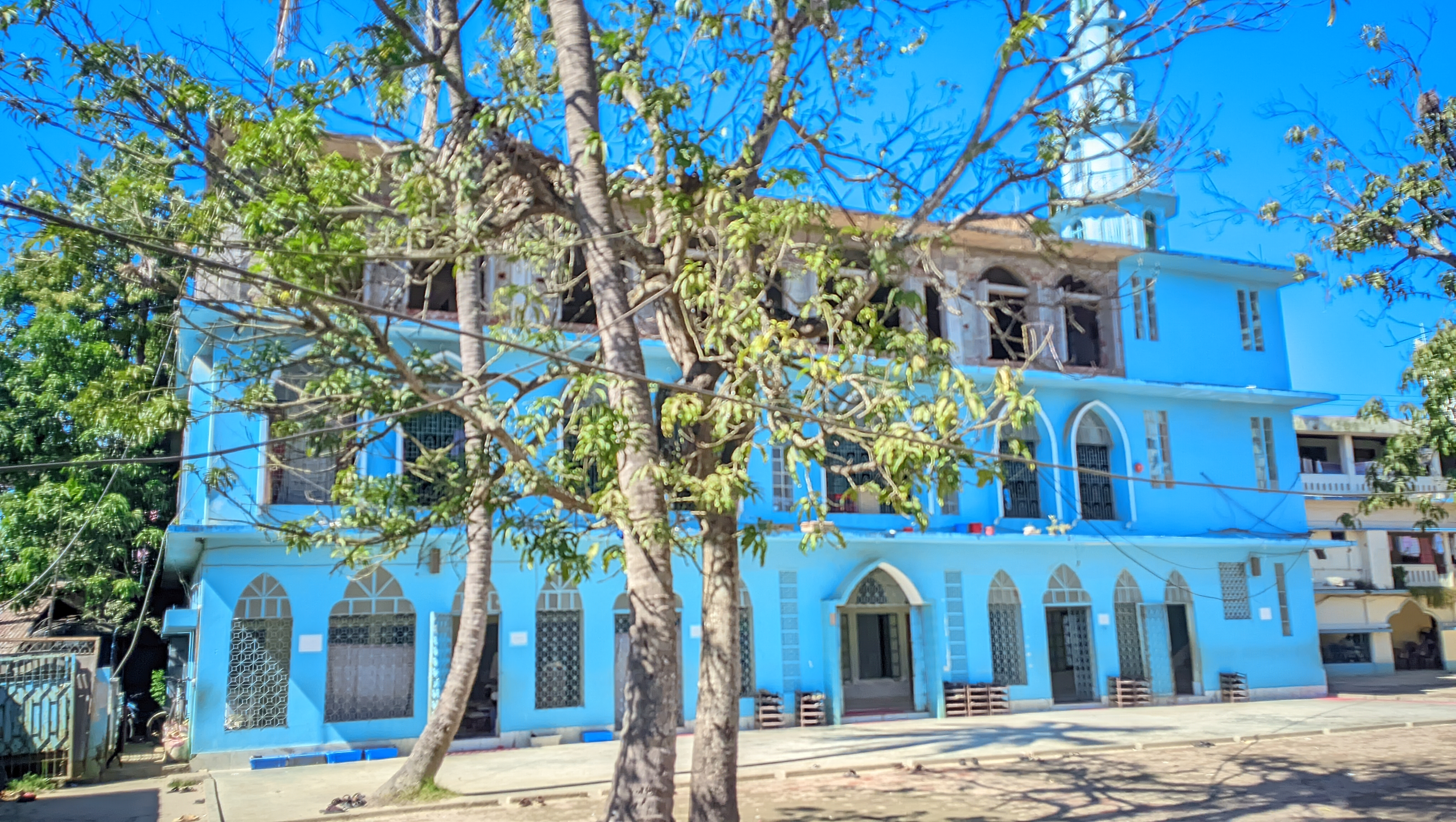
- Type: Islamic university
- Established: 1985
- Principal: Allama Muhammad sahidullah kawsary
- Faculty: 60
- Students: 1100
- Location: Bahaddarhat, Chittagong District, Bangladesh; 22.3884°N 91.8456°E
- Campus: Urban

Jāmiʿah Dārul Maʿārif al-Islāmiah (Bengali: জামেয়া দারুল মা'আরিফ আল্ ইসলামিয়া, Arabic: جامعة دار المعارف الإسلامية), popularly known as Darul Marif, is a Qawmi jamiah situated at Bahaddarhat, Chittagong, Bangladesh. Sultan Zauq Nadvi is the founder director of the jamiah.

== Academics ==
Jamia Darul Ma'arif offers the students Islamic education from the very initial stage up to the highest level. Besides Islamic knowledge it also teaches the student modern knowledge in subjects like English and Bengali languages, mathematics, geography, history, social science and general science up to secondary level.

It also offers specialization in Islamic studies and jurisprudence to students who successfully complete Takmil (MA).

=== College and departments ===
The jamiah has the following departments:

- College of Arabic language and Islamic Studies
- Department of Hifzul Qur'an
- Department of Adab (Arabic Literature)
- Department of Islamic law
- Department of Dawah and Islamic studies
- Arabic language course (one year or two years)
- Journalism and Mass Communication course (one year)

== Publications ==
Jamia Darul Ma'arif Al-Islamia publishes several publications as below:

1. Monthly Al Haq (monthly magazine in Bengali)
2. Manarus Sharq (periodically Arabic magazine)
