= Rashid Ahmed Ludhianvi =

Pakistani Muslim scholar

Grand Mufti Rashid Ahmed Ludhianvi
- مفتی رشید احمد لدھیانوی

Rector of Jamia Tur Rasheed
- In office 1977–2002
- Preceded by: Position established
- Succeeded by: Mufti Abdul Raheem

Personal life
- Born: 26 September 1922 Ludhiana, Punjab, British India
- Died: 19 February 2002 (aged 79) Karachi, Sindh, Pakistan
- Political party: Jamiat Ulema-e-Islam; Majlis-e-Ahrar-ul-Islam
- Notable work: Ahsan-ul-Fatawa
- Education: Darul Uloom Deoband; Jamia Khairul Madaris

Religious life
- Religion: Islam
- Denomination: Sunni
- Founder of: Aid Organization of the Ulema; Jamia Tur Rasheed, Karachi
- Jurisprudence: Hanafi
- Movement: Deobandi

Muslim leader
- Teacher: Hussain Ahmad Madani
- Disciples: Rafi Usmani, Taqi Usmani

Rashid Ahmad Ludhianvi (Urdu: مفتی رشید احمد لدھیانوی; also known as Mufti Rashid Ahmad; 26 September 1922 – 19 February 2002), was a Pakistani Islamic scholar and faqīh, who founded the Al Rashid Trust and the Jamia Tur Rasheed in Karachi. He served as the head of Darul Ifta Wal Irshad, a jurisprudential institute of the Darul Uloom Karachi and authored books such as Anwaar-ur-Rasheed, Jawahir-ur-Rasheed and Allah Ke Baghi Musalman. His religo-legal edicts were compiled and published as Ahsan ul-Fatawa in ten volumes.

== Early life ==
Rashid Ahmad Ludhianvi graduated from the Darul Uloom Deoband where his teachers included Hussain Ahmad Madani.

== Career ==
Ludhianvi taught at institutions including Madinatul 'Uloom, Hyderabad, Jamia Darul Huda Therhi, Jamia Darul Uloom, Karachi, and Darul Ifta Wal Irshad for approximately forty years. He served as the director of Education at Darul Ifta.. He established Al Rashid Trust, now called the Aid Organization of the Ulema. He also founded Jamia Tur Rasheed, an Islamic seminary in Karachi.

== Relations with the Afghan Taliban ==
He was also a notable supporter of the Afghan Taliban, and after he returned with "extremely positive impressions" from Afghanistan and wrote a book as advice for the Talibans, titled Obedience to the Amir and composed in 1998 or 1999, Mullah Omar was so impressed that he distributed Pashto and Dari versions of it to the visitors, saying it perfectly represented the Talibans’ ideology, while Barnett Rubin states that this "manual on how to run a militant organization" helped the Taliban "devise an organizational model that suppressed tribalism and patronage network more effectively than any other organization in Afghanistan."

== Books ==
He authored more than 150 books, including :

- Ahsanul Fatawa, his collection of fatwa in 10 volumes.
- Anwaar-ur-Rasheed
- Jawahir-ur-Rasheed
- Rasail-ur-Rasheed
- Har Preshani Ka Elaj
- Allah Ke Baghi Musalman
