= Paigham-i-Pakistan =

Fatwa issued by 1,800 scholars forbidding all forms of terrorism

Paigham-i-Pakistan or Paigham-e-Pakistan (transl. Message of Pakistan Urdu: پیغام پاکستان) was a 2016 fatwa sought by the Government of Pakistan to counter terrorism.

Ulama unanimously declared terrorism, suicide attacks, and killing someone, haram in Islam.

The fatwa was prepared by International Islamic University and signed by 1,800 scholars from various Islamic schools of thought.

== See also ==
- Terrorism in Pakistan
