= Sindh Muslim Government Science College =

College in Karachi, Pakistan

- سندھ مسلم گورنمنٹ سائنس کالج
- Type: Public sector
- Established: 1943
- Affiliations: Sindh Madressatul Islam University
- Location: Shahrah-e-Liaquat, Karachi, Sindh, Pakistan
- Website: smgsc.edu.pk

Sindh Muslim Government Science College or simply S.M. Government Science College (Urdu: سندھ مسلم گورنمنٹ سائنس کالج); (Sindhi: سنڌ مسلم گورنمٽ سائنس ڪالج) is a government college located in Karachi, Sindh, Pakistan.

== History ==
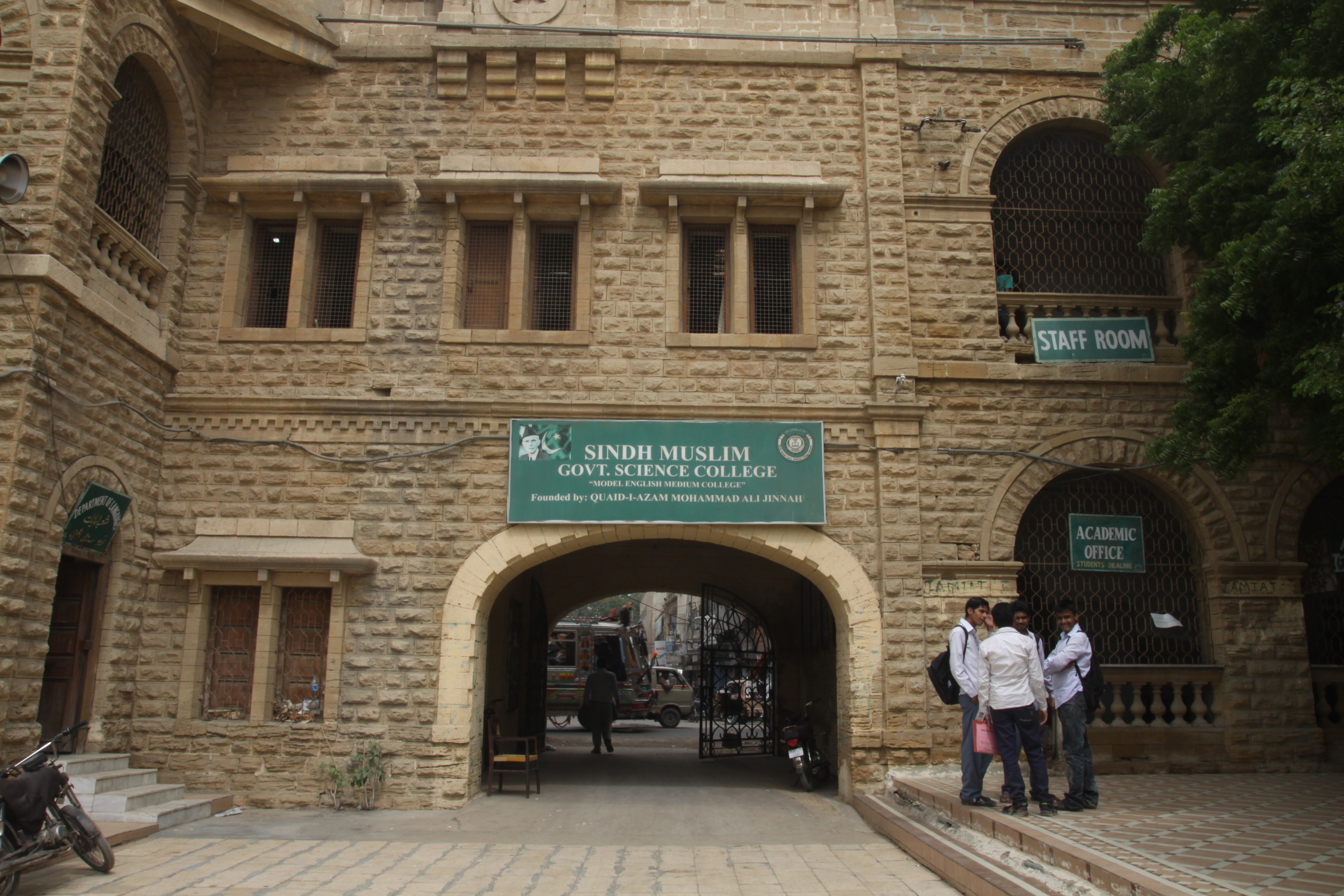
A view of SM Science College Karachi.

It was founded by the founder of Pakistan Muhammad Ali Jinnah on 21 June 1943 for the Muslims of Sindh.

In 2012, it was announced that the college will be merged into the Sindh Madressatul Islam University. Later, it was suspended by the Sindh High Court.

== Gallery ==
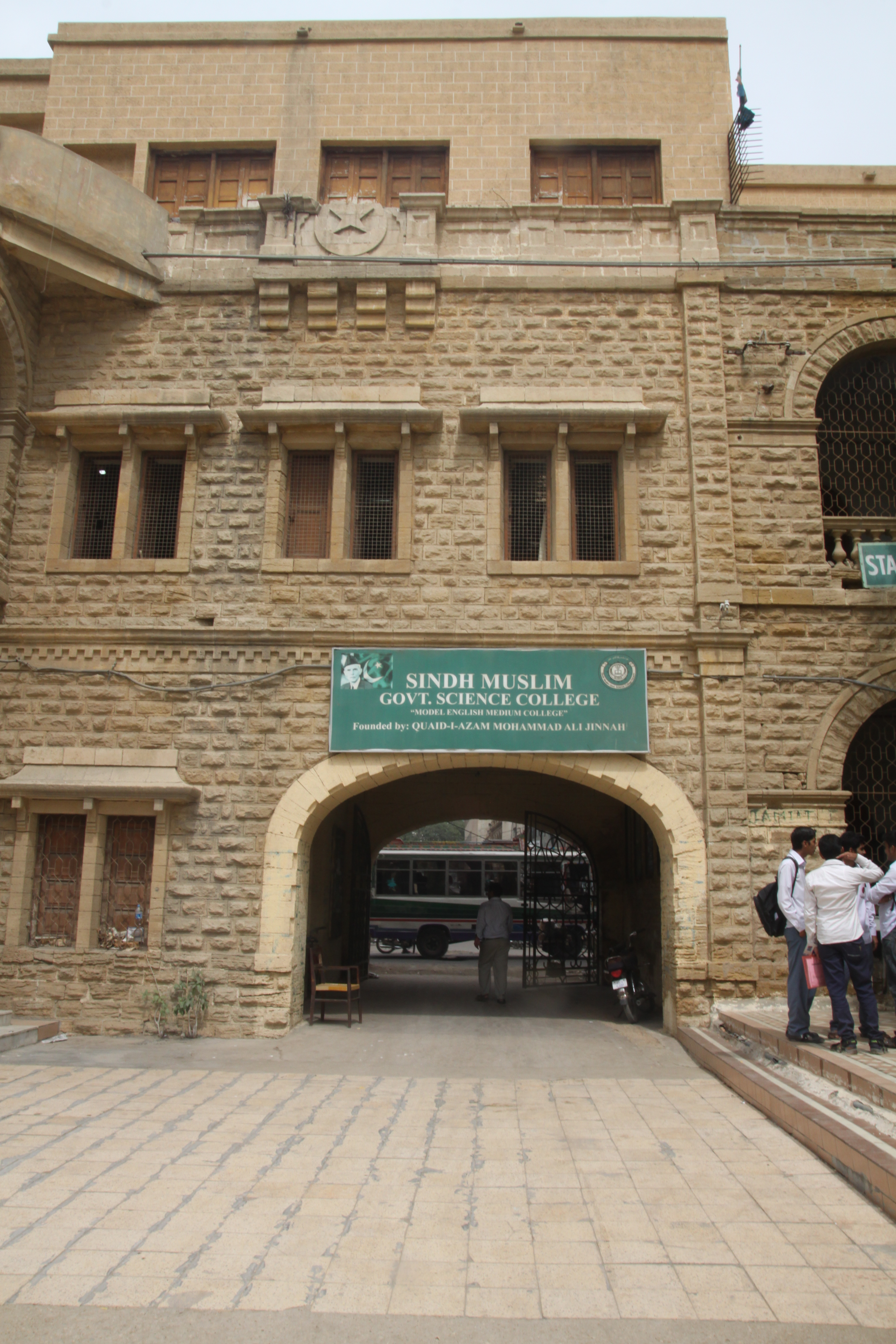

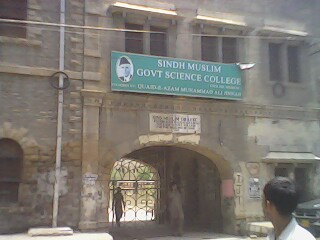

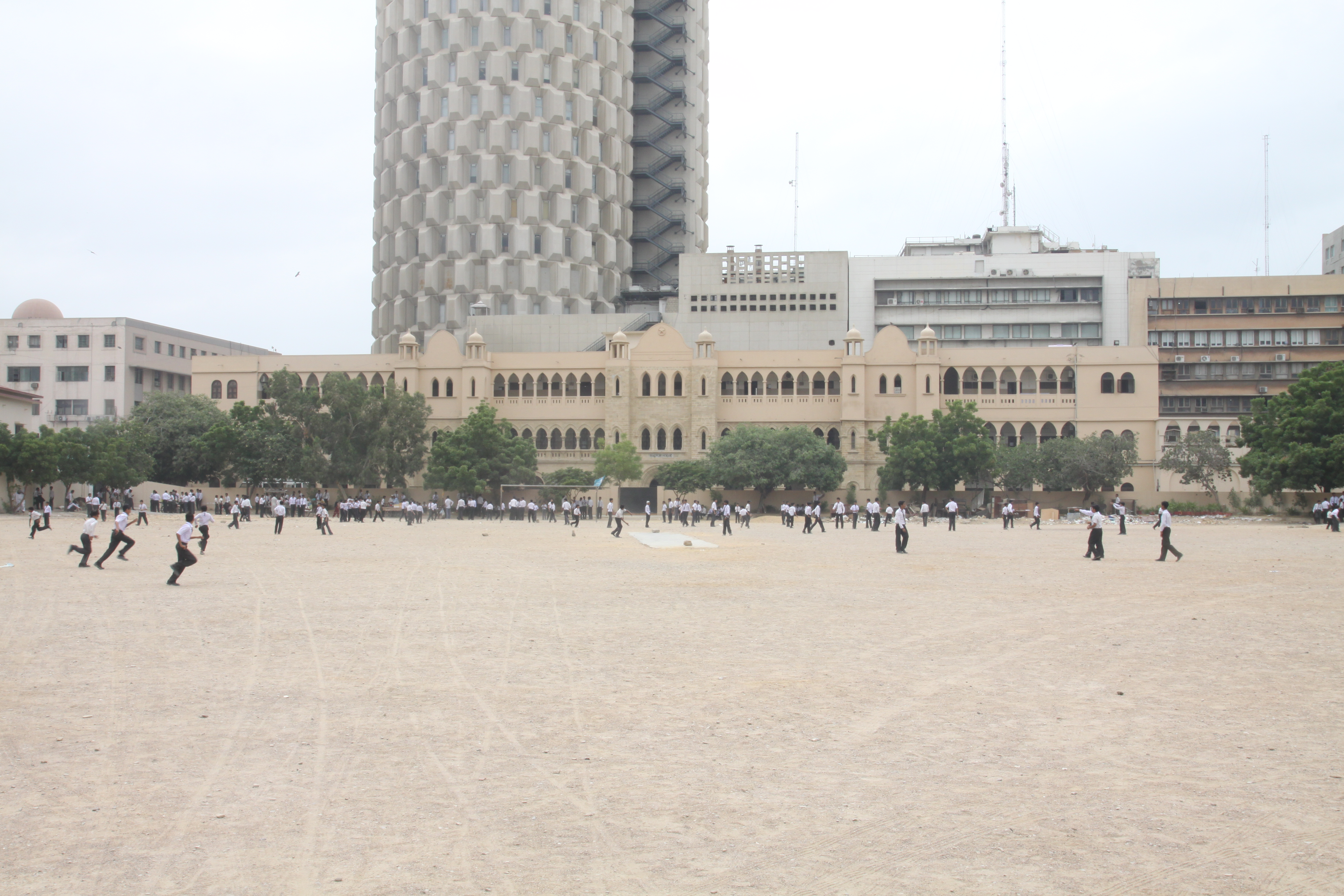

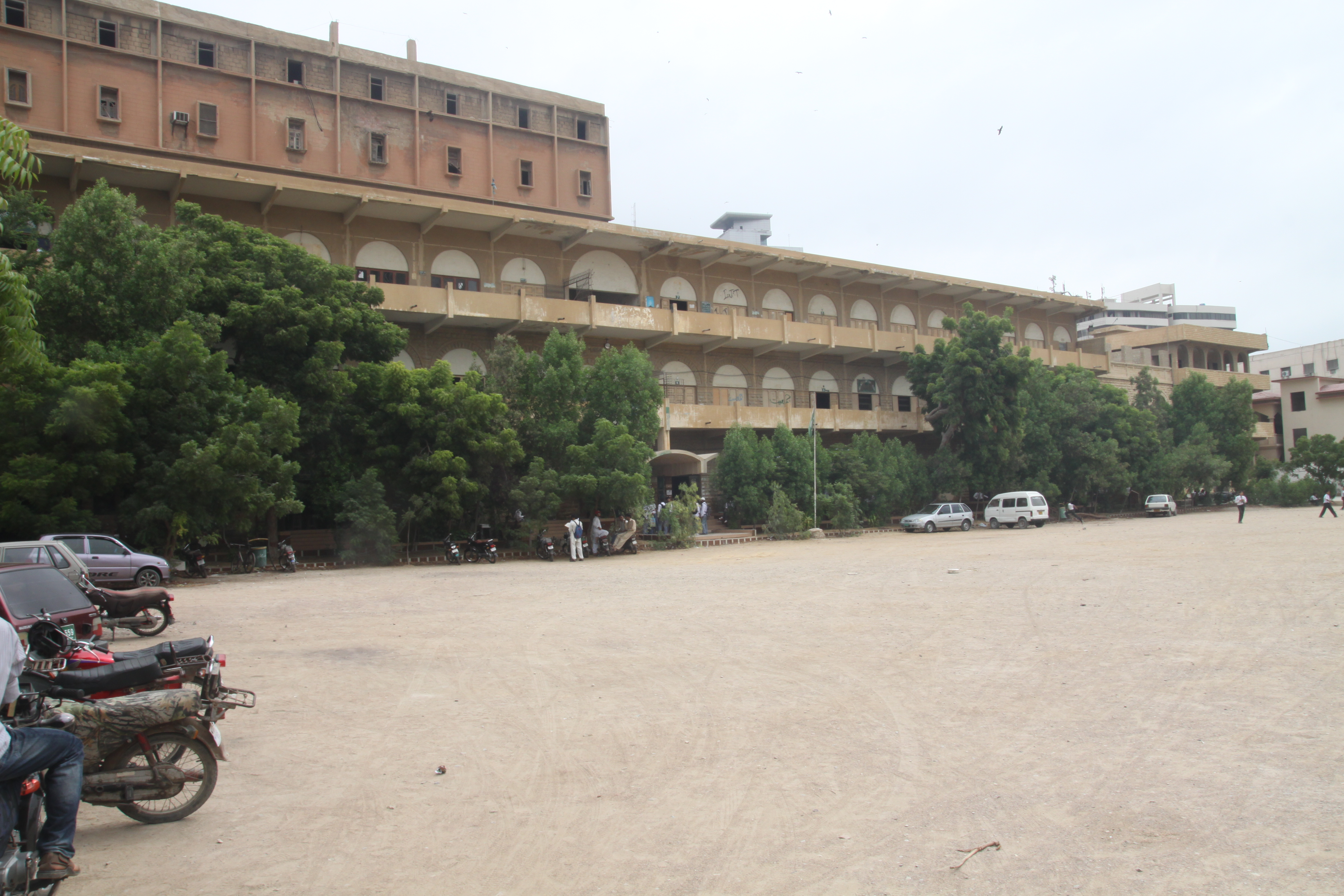
