= Jamia Tawakkulia Renga Madrasah =

Madrasa in Sylhet, Bangladesh

Jamia Tawakkulia Renga
- জামেয়া তাওয়াক্কুলিয়া রেঙ্গা
- Type: Islamic university
- Established: 1919
- Religious affiliation: Islam
- Principal: Muhiul Islam Burhan (acting)
- Administrative staff: 50 (2015)
- Students: 1,500 (2015)
- Location: Renga, Mogla Bazar, South Surma, Sylhet District, Bangladesh; 24.789°N 91.908°E
- Campus: Urban/Semi Urban
- Language: Bengali, Arabic
- Website: rengamadrasah.com

Jamia Tawakkulia Renga (Arabic: الجامعة التوکلية رنغا), or simply Renga Madrasah (Bengali: রেঙ্গা মাদ্রাসা), is a madrasah located in the village of Renga, near Mogla Bazar, in South Surma Upazila, about 13 kilometres (8.1 mi) south of Sylhet, Bangladesh, along the Sylhet to Moulvibazar Highway.

== History ==
The madrasa was founded in 1919 by Maulana Shah Arkan Ali. It then came under the leadership of his son, Maulana Badrul Alam Shaykh-e-Renga, who was a mufassir and khalifa of Hussain Ahmad Madani, with Maulana Sikandar Ali serving as vice-principal. Allama Qamaruddin was appointed as the madrasa's first Shaykhul Hadith and he served for two years. The second Shaykhul Hadith was Allama Shihabuddin, a khalifa of Abdul Karim Kouria, who served for 47 years. The third principal of the madrasa was Maulana Shamsul Islam Khalil ibn Shaykh-e-Renga who served from 1977 to 2012. He was succeeded by his brother, Maulana Muhiul Islam Burhan ibn Shaykh-e-Renga, who is the current principal.

== Education levels ==
The Jamia offers primary, secondary, higher secondary, undergraduate, and postgraduate Islamic education.

== Students and staff ==
As of 2015, there are 42 staff (academic and administrative combined) and enrollment is roughly 1,350.
