= Qawmi madrasa =

Type of religious school in Bangladesh

Qawmi madrasa (Bengali: কওমী মাদ্রাসা, romanized: Kôomī mādrāsā, pronounced [ˈkou̯miˑ ˈmad̪ɾasaˑ]; Arabic: المدرسة القومية, romanized: al-Madrasah al-Qawmiyyah) is one of the two major madrasah educational categories in Bangladesh. These madrasahs are not regulated by the Bangladesh Madrasah Education Board. As private charitable organizations, Qawmi madrasahs are supported almost exclusively by donation.

In the past, the degrees they conferred lacked accreditation or official recognition, unlike those conferred by official Alia madrasahs (also spelled "Aliya" and "Aliah"), which follow the Calcutta Alia tradition. Starting in 2006, two years after the founding of the privately run Befaqul Mudarressin education board for Qawmi madrasahs, the Government of Bangladesh began to recognize some Qawmi degrees.

As of 2006, there were approximately 15,000 registered Qawmi madrasahs in Bangladesh. with 200,000 teachers educating 4 million students. Actual figures are unknown^{b} and Qawmi madrasas do not keep enrollment records. Moreover, it has been argued that if unregistered Qawmi madrasahs were counted then it could put the total number of Bangladeshi madrasahs as high as 64,000^{a}—suggesting that Qawmi madrasahs outnumber their official Alia counterparts (of which 25,201 existed in 2004).

== History ==
Qawmi educational practices originate from the traditional Muslim educational system of Bangladesh. During the British colonial period, these types of madrasahs were called "Khariji," or outside of government. Later, the term "Qawmi" emerged from the word "qom" (meaning "the public")—stemming from the fact that Qawmi madrasahs reject state funding and instead rely on donations from the public.

After 1971, some Qawmi madrasahs began to modernize their teaching, such as by switching the language of instruction from Urdu to Bengali and adding some English language and mathematics lessons. In 1978, a government body called the "Non-government Education Board" was established in an attempt to co-ordinate these madrasahs, of which 2,043 registered with that board by 1998.

The later part of the 20th century saw a major largely unregulated growth in the whole madrasah sector, which expanded from roughly 4,100 schools in 1986 to potentially as many as 64,000 schools by 2005.

The Befaqul Mudarressin of Bangladesh Qawmi Madrasah Education Board was formed in 2004. Soon afterwards, from August 2006, the Bangladeshi government began recognizing and supporting the Qawmi system through recognizing the 'Dawra degree' of the Qaumi madrasas as equivalent to master's degree in Islamic Studies or Arabic literature. By this time, approximately 15,000 madrasahs had registered with the Befaqul Mudarressin. In April 2017, Prime Minister Sheikh Hasina reiterated her commitment to the earlier recognition of certificates of Dawrae Hadith under Qawmi Madrasa Education Boards as equivalent to master's degree in Islamic Studies and Arabic.

== Qawmi education systems ==
There are two major Qawmi educational systems: those that use the old Dars-i-Nizami curriculum and those that have a modified Nizami curriculum (such as by including the English language and the subject of mathematics).

The Dars-i-Nizami system originated from early eighteenth century India. There is some controversy regarding movements to "reform" the system, with some calling the move "an 'anti-Islamic' conspiracy, alleging that these are a means to secularise madrasas and rob them of their Islamic identity"—though reformers generally contest that they do not want secularization and that they are not a conspiracy.

In general, Qawmi primary education lasts six years, though it does not differentiate students by progressive grade levels. While the Qawmi primary level covers all subjects found in other madrasah systems, there is no specific time-sequence or order by which subjects are taught, as would be expected in grade-based systems. Thus, imposing class-graduated terminology on the Qawmi system may not be meaningful.

== Befaqul Mudarressin of Bangladesh Qawmi Madrasah Education Board ==
In 2004, many Qawmi madrasahs began organizing together under an umbrella organization called the Befaqul Mudarressin (also transliterated as Wafaq ul Madaris) of Bangladesh Qawmi Madrasah Education Board, based in Dhaka, including seven smaller private Madrasah education boards. It is an extension of the process that formed the Wafaq ul Madaris Al-Arabia, Pakistan in 1957.

The board was founded to assure a standardized curriculum and to provide a centralized examination. Membership with the board is voluntary, though required for degree accreditation by the Befaqul Mudarressin.

It is organized under a three-tiered representative system led an executive body. The second tier committee comprises senior madrasahs, followed a third tier of ordinary member schools.

=== Statistics ===
As of 2008, the board oversees almost 9000 madrasahs at the following levels:

Madrasahs under the Qawmi education board by level
Level	Analogue/description	# of Schools*
Takmil	Master's	300
Fazilat	Bachelor's	200
Sanaria ammah	secondary	1000
Mutawassitah	lower secondary	2000
Ibtedayi	primary	3000
Tahfeez ul Quran	memorisation of the Qur'an	2000
*Madrasahs are listed by highest level taught since some offer more than one level.

== Qawmi schools ==
The following are some of the notable Qawmi madrasahs in Bangladesh:

- Islamic Online Madrasah (IOM) — is the largest online madrasah in the Asia
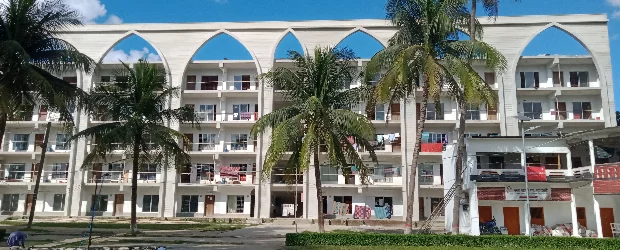
- Gawhardanga Madrasa
  Befaqul Madarisil Qawmia Gawhardanga Bangladesh — is the Board Of Qawmi
- Al-Jamiatul Arabia Kachemul Uloom Kazirhat Hifz Madrasah and Orphanage - also known as "Kazirhat Madrasah"
- Al-Jamiatul Ahlia Darul Ulum Moinul Islam — also known as "Hathazari Madrasah"
- Jamia Islamia Yunusia, Brahmanbaria
- Jamia sharyah seirajul ulum and nur shishosadan, Brahmanbaria
- Jamia Madania Angura Muhammedpur (Jamia Angura), Beanibazar, Sylhet - Also known as Banglar Deobond.
- Jamia Tawakkulia Renga Madrasah in Sylhet
- Jamiatul Uloom Al-Islamia Lalkhan Bazar — also known as "Lalkhan Bazar Madrasah"
- Jamia Qurania Arabia Lalbagh
- Jamia Millia Madania Arabia Mirpur Azma Mohila Madrasa - "Center of Girls Madrasa"
- Al-Jamiah Al-Islamiah Patiya
- Al-Jamiatul Arabia Lil Banina Wal Banat — also known as "Haildhar Madrasah"
- Madrasa Management Software for Full Web Base Qawmi Academy Management Software by GreenBangla21

== See also ==
- List of Qawmi Madrasas in Bangladesh
- Education in Bangladesh
- Islam in Bangladesh
- Religious education
- Charity school
- List of Islamic seminaries
- Bengali Muslims

== Footnotes ==
- ^a Bano (2008) seems to somewhat misquote Ahmed (2005), which is cited just before this note.
- ^b While two sources cited say there are about 4000 Qawmi madrasas, my editorial judgement based upon research is that the 4000 school figure is far too conservative; moreover, the 15,000 madrasah figure is 4 years newer.
