= Jamia Binoria =

Islamic educational institute

Jamia Binoria Aalamia
- الجامعۃ البنوریۃ العالمیۃ
- Type: Islamic university
- Established: 1979 (1398 Hijri)
- Founder: Mufti Muhammad Naeem
- Religious affiliation: Sunni Islam (Hanafi school, Deobandi movement)
- Academic affiliations: Wifaq ul Madaris; Board of Islamic Sciences
- Chancellor: Noman Naeem
- Vice-Chancellor: Noman Naeem
- Rector: Farhan Naeem
- Students: 8,000 (total)
- Location: Karachi, Sindh, Pakistan
- Campus: Urban, 12 acres (4.9 ha)
- Website: www.binoria.org

Jamia Binoria Aalamia (Arabic: الجامعۃ البنوریۃ العالمیۃ) is an Islamic University in Karachi, Sindh, Pakistan. It is regarded as one of the most modern madrassas. Noman Naeem is the chancellor of the seminary.

== History ==
Jamia Binoria was founded by Mufti Muhammed Naeem in 1978 (Rajab 1398 AH). It is affiliated with Ittehad Tanzeematul Madaris-e-Deeniya (ITMD), a confederacy of five religious education boards. At one time, Jamiah Binoria is said to have had the highest enrollment of foreign students in Pakistan. The international enrollment dropped following the September 11, 2001 attacks. In 2005, it had around 3,000 male and 500 female students, including students from the United States, Canada, United Kingdom, France, Germany and East Asia. Jamia Binoria also has ifta courses for women, thereafter calling them "muftia" (female Muftis).

On 23 June 2020, Noman Naeem was appointed as the chancellor (or principal) of the seminary following the death of his father Mufti Muhammad Naeem on 20 June 2020.

== Departments ==
Jamia Binoria has the following departments:

- Administration Department
- Computer Department
- Dar-ul-Iftaa Department
- Department of Dars e Nizami (Alim Course)
- Department of Hifz-ul-Quran
- Department of Publication
- Department of Tajweed-ul-Quran
- Department of Takhassus (Mufti Course)
- Madrasa-tul-Banat (Female Section)
- IT Department (Binoria IT Solutions)
- Media Department (Binoria Media)
- Department Fundraising (Call Center)

== Chancellors ==
- Mufti Muhammad Naeem (died 20 June 2020)
- Noman Naeem (23 June 2020 – incumbent)

== Notable Alumni ==
- Shafiq Mengal, pro-Pakistani Baloch militia commander and former drug smuggler turned politician

== See also ==
- Darul 'Uloom Karachi
